= Defenture MAMMOTH =

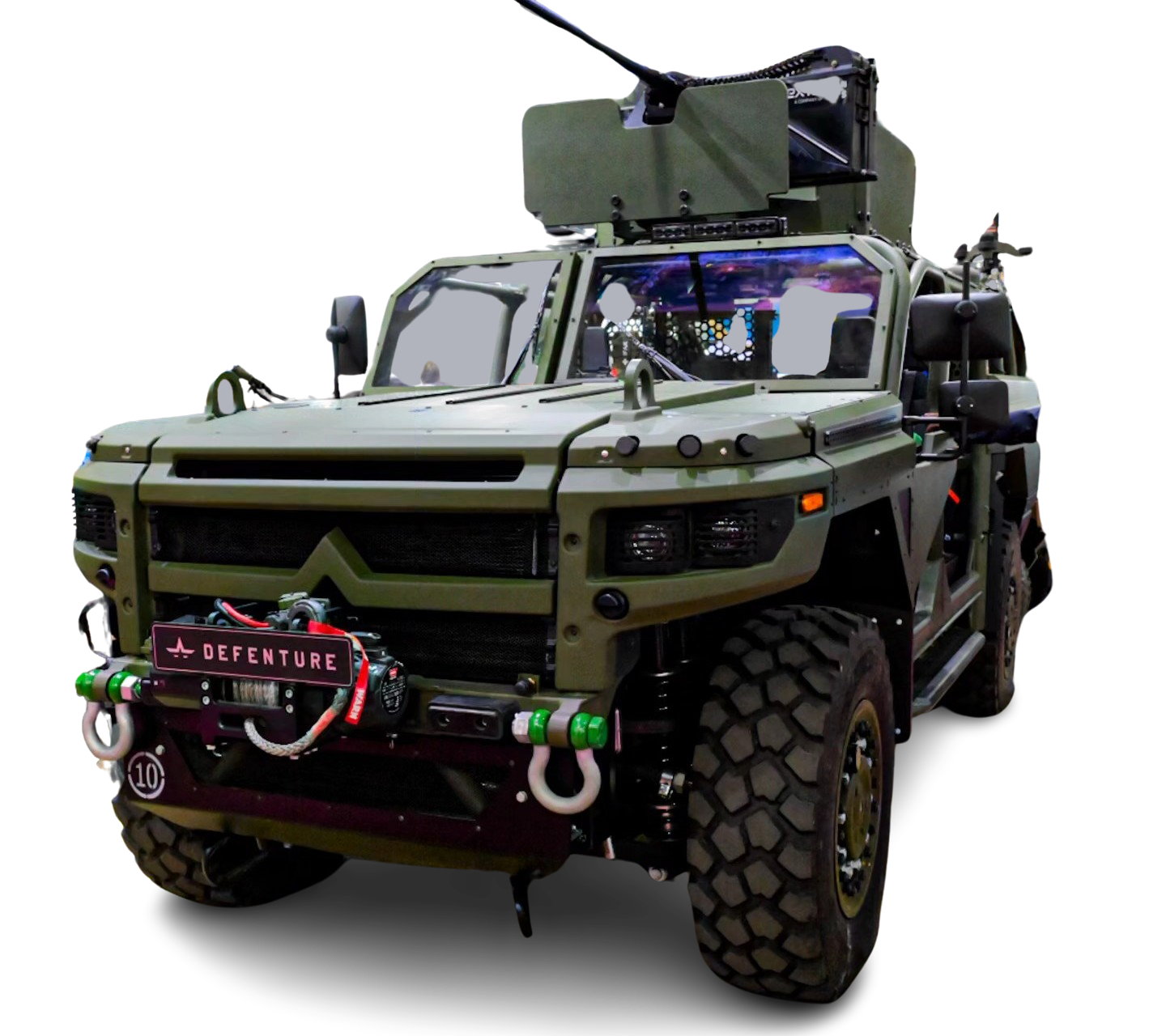
- Type: Military light utility vehicle
- Place of origin: Netherlands

Service history
- In service: Planned for 2027
- Used by: Germany

Production history
- Designed: 2021 - 2024
- Manufacturer: Defenture
- Produced: Since 2026
- No. built: 4 prototypes 49 on order

Specifications
- Mass: 5,300 kg (11,700 lb) (kerb); 8,800 kg (19,400 lb) (GVW)
- Length: 5,650 mm (18 ft 6 in)
- Width: 1,990 mm (6 ft 6 in)
- Height: 2,260 mm (7 ft 5 in)
- Armor: Optional composite armour kit (STANAG 4569 Level 1)
- Engine: Steyr M16 (3.2 l, inline-six, multi-fuel engine); 200 kW (270 PS); 610 N⋅m (450 ft⋅lb)
- Payload capacity: 3,500 kg (7,700 lb)
- Transmission: ZF 8HP automatic transmission (8F / 1R) (+ hi/low transfer case + lock, locking differentials)
- Suspension: Independent suspension (4-wheel steering)
- Ground clearance: 366 mm (14.4 in) (unprepared fording1,000 mm (3 ft 3 in))
- Fuel capacity: 164 L (36 imp gal; 43 US gal)
- Operational range: 800 km (500 mi)
- Maximum speed: 110 km/h (68 mph) (limited)

The MAMMOTH (Versatile Expeditionary Commando Tactial Off Road) is a Dutch all-terrain tactical vehicle, designed and developed by defence contractor Defenture for use with special operations forces.

Its main qualities presented by Defenture are its mobility, agility versatility and fire power.

== Development ==
The vehicle is a further evolution of the Defenture GRF. It was pre-selected by the German special forces in 2021. It was presented for the first time at Eurosatory 2024.

The design of the vehicle was supported by Steketee Design.

== Description ==
=== Protection ===
It is unprotected in its base design, but has modular armour add-ons:

- Kinetic protection: STANAG 4569 level 1
- Artillery protection: STANAG 4569 level 1
- IED, mine and grenade blast protection: STANAG 4569 level 1

=== Transport ===
It is an air-transportable platform, dedicated to special operations and para operations:

- Internally: C-130H / J and A400M
- Externally: CH-53 (currently used by the German Air Force) and Boeing CH-47F Block II (future helicopter of the German Air Force)

It is also transportable in an ISO container.

=== Weaponry ===
The platform is modular, and has multiple options for manned and unmanned weapon mounts.

=== Variants ===
The current variants that have been developed are the ones selected by the German Army.

==== AGF-2 ====
It is a reconnaissance and combat vehicle (Aufklärungs- und Gefechtsfahrzeug), and it succeeds to the AGF Serval.

==== AGF-2 FSV ====
This variant is a reconnaissance and combat vehicle equipped for a fire support role, it is equipped with a KNDS France M621 autocannon (20×102mm).

==== UFK ====
UFK stands for Unterstützungsfahrzeuge Kommando Spezialkräfte. It is a tactical support vehicle.

== Operators ==
=== Future operators ===
(Germany) German Armed Forces (80 + additional to be ordered)
In June 2021 the Bundestag approved the budget for the development of a new special operations vehicle family based on Defenture's GRF platform, intended to replace the Aufklärungs- und Gefechtsfahrzeug (AGF) Serval of the Kommando Spezialkräfte. Budgets for an initial 49 vehicles have been approved, the total program requirements amount to 80 vehicles. From this, Defenture developed the three vehicle variants, and supplied 4 prototypes in 2024.
In December 2025, the Bundeswehr ordered 49 vehicles with an option for 31 additional vehicles:
- 26 AGF-2
- 8 FSV
- 15 UFK

== See also ==
- Defenture GRF
- DMV Anaconda
- Manticore
