= Versatile Expeditionary Commando Tactial Off Road =

VECTOR
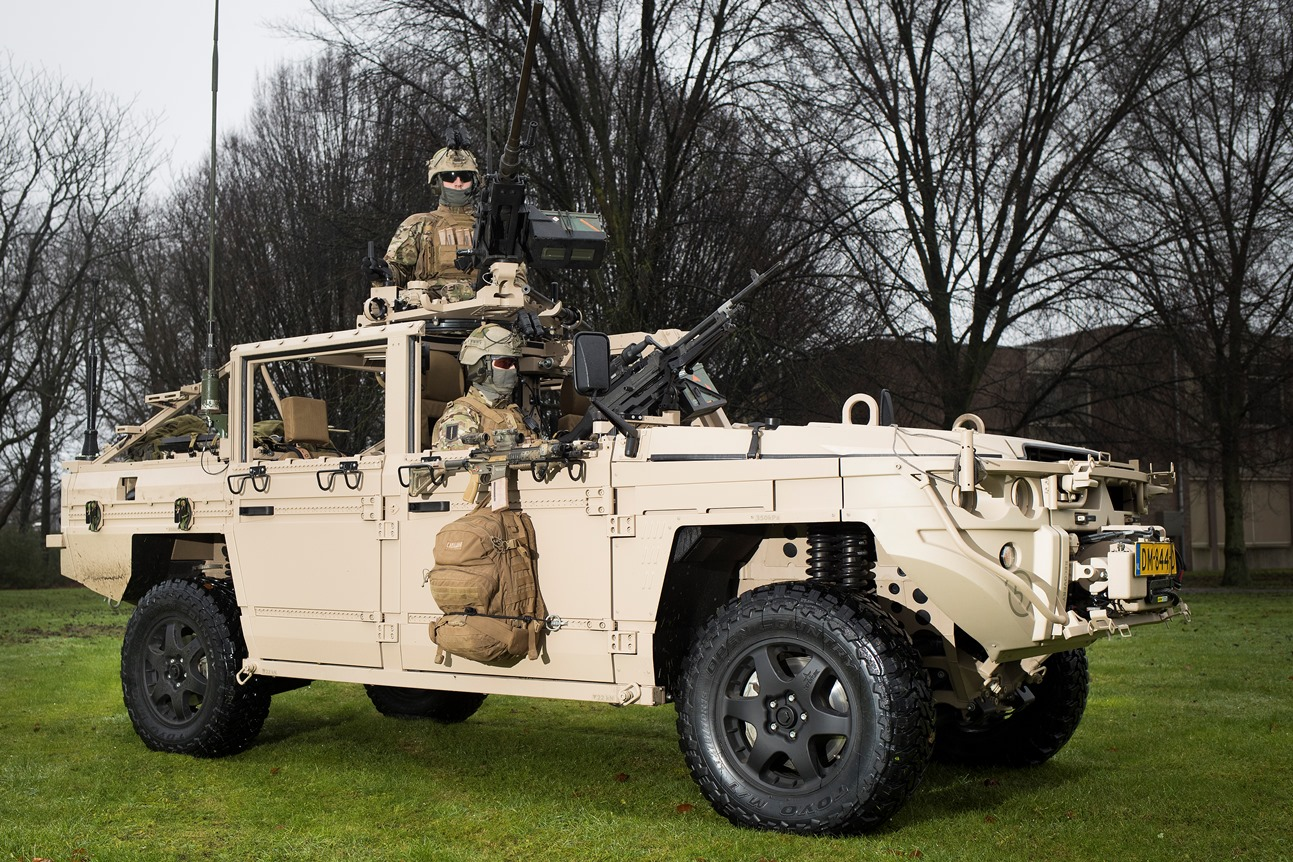
- VECTOR prototype pictured in 2017
- Type: Military light utility vehicle
- Place of origin: Netherlands

Production history
- Manufacturer: Defenture

Specifications
- Mass: 3,070 kg (6,770 lb)
- Length: 5,100 mm (16 ft 9 in)
- Width: 1,800 mm (5 ft 11 in)
- Height: 2,205 mm (7 ft 2.8 in) (1,870 mm (6 ft 2 in) for transport with ringmount folded)
- Crew: 2
- Passengers: 2
- Armor: Optional composite armour kit (STANAG 4569 Level 1)
- Main armament: 1 × 40 mm HK GMG grenade launcher or M2 Browning .50 heavy machine gun
- Secondary armament: 1 × FN Minimi light machine gun or FN MAG general-purpose machine gun
- Engine: Steyr M16 (3.2 l, inline-six, multi-fuel engine); 160 kW (220 PS); 500 N⋅m (370 ft⋅lb)
- Payload capacity: 1,440 kg (3,170 lb)
- Transmission: ZF 6HP automatic transmission (6F / 1R) (+ hi/low transfer case + lock, locking differentials)
- Ground clearance: 340 mm (13 in)
- Fuel capacity: 115 L (25 imp gal; 30 US gal)
- Operational range: 800 km (500 mi)
- Maximum speed: 130 km/h (81 mph) (limited)

The VECTOR (Versatile Expeditionary Commando Tactial Off Road) is a Dutch light all-terrain tactical vehicle, designed and developed by defence contractor Defenture for use with special operations forces. The VECTOR was developed in close cooperation with the Korps Commandotroepen (KCT) of the Royal Netherlands Army and is tailor-made for use in special operations, providing a combination of high mobility and firepower with light armour.

== Development ==
In 2013, the Dutch Ministry of Defence launched a procurement program aimed at replacing the Mercedes-Benz G280 CDI fleet of the KCT. While experiences with the Mercedes-Benz vehicles in Afghanistan and Mali were generally satisfactory, the vehicles lacked power, payload capacity and clearance deemed necessary for the SOF Mobility Concept. In addition to the engine and payload requirements, the replacement vehicles should be transportable in and under the CH-47 Chinook transport helicopters of the Royal Netherlands Air Force. Dutch entrepreneur Gerard Rond, who had extensive experience in the rallying branch, created the consortium Defenture which incorporated (among others) VDL Groep and TenCate. The consortium developed the Groundforce (GRF) platform which became the basis of the VECTOR vehicle. Consequently, Defenture submitted the bid and on 3 July 2013 it was announced that Defenture won the tender for a total of 50 vehicles with their VECTOR offer. Other bids included the General Dynamics Flyer.

The research and development phase continued after the contract was awarded and involved close cooperation with the Defence Materiel Organisation (DMO) and the end-users. In 2014, the KCT received the first two prototypes which were subsequently subject to an extensive set of trials. Deliveries of serial production vehicles commenced in December 2017 at the production facilities located in Tiel. In June 2018, the Ministry of Defence announced that Defenture was awarded the contract for an additional 25 vehicles, the complete order therefore amounting to 75 vehicles. Deliveries were completed in July 2020.

== Description ==
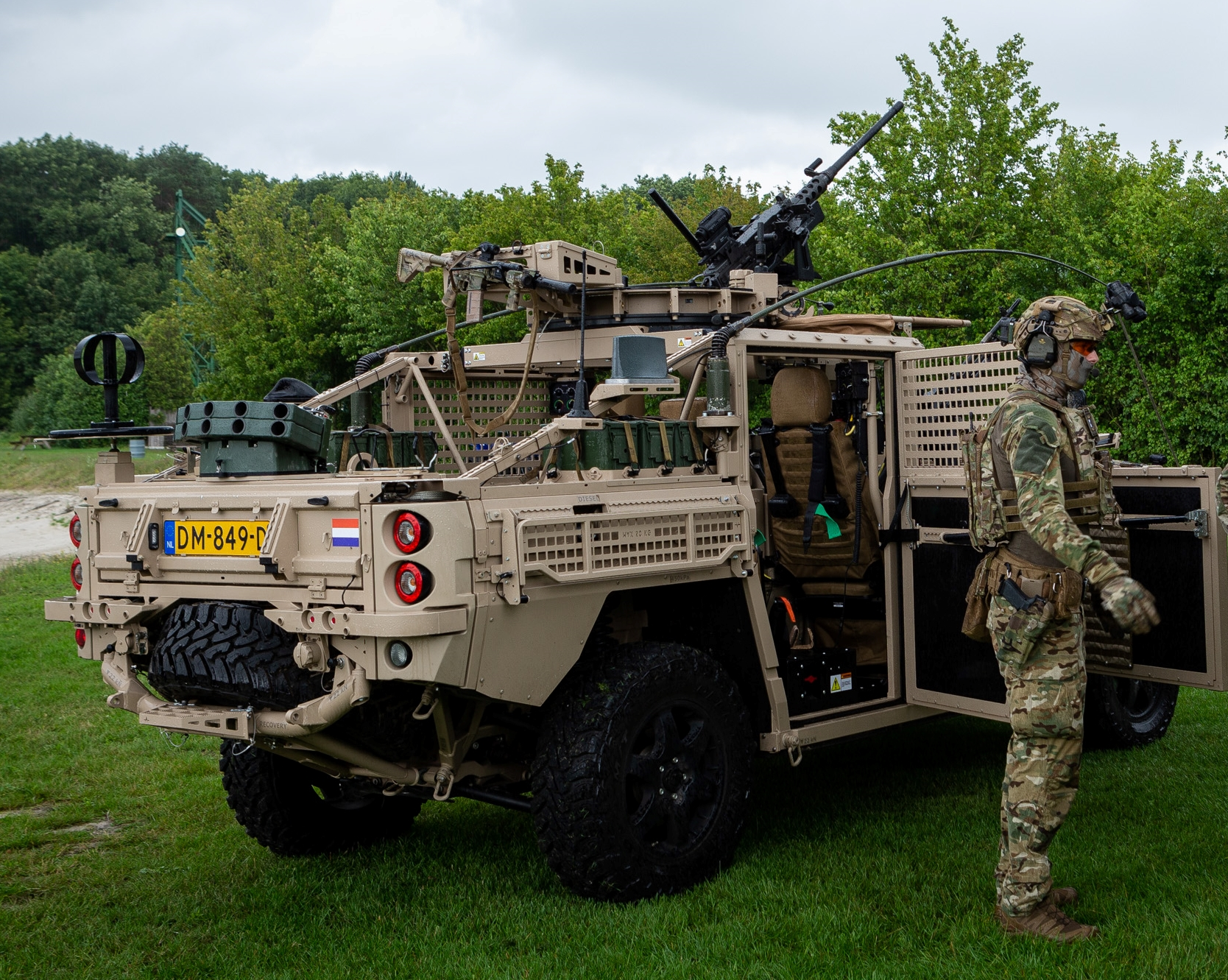
Operational VECTOR equipped with jammers, communication systems and smoke grenade launchers

=== Drivetrain ===
The VECTOR is powered by a 3,200 cc Steyr six-cylinder diesel engine, which produces 220 hp (160 kW) and 500 Nm of torque. The maximum speed is limited at 130 km/h, the 115 L fuel tank gives the VECTOR an operational range of 800 km The Steyr engine is linked to a ZF six-speed automatic transmission. The permanent four-wheel drive with three differentials, the optional four-wheel steering allows for a turning radius of 9 metres. The maximum payload capacity of the VECTOR is 1,440 kg, the curb weight is 3070 kg with a maximum vehicle weight of 4,700 kg. The VECTOR can wade through 75 cm of water.

=== Cockpit ===
The driver and passenger seat are adjustable to the needs of the occupants and are fitted with detachable back support modules, the rear seats are foldable. The VECTOR is equipped with a digital dashboard which displays the status of all critical systems.

=== Weaponry ===
The VECTOR comes standard with two weapon mounts. The passenger has access to a swing mount which can be fitted with a FN MAG general-purpose machine gun or a FN Minimi squad automatic weapon. The height of the passenger seat is adjustable in order to enable optimal ergonomics for the shooter. The ring mount is fitted in the centre of the vehicle and can be equipped with a Browning M2 heavy machine gun or a HK GMG automatic grenade launcher. In addition, the VECTOR is equipped with 10 smoke grenade dischargers: five on the front and five on the rear of the vehicle.

=== Communications ===
The VECTOR can be equipped with a range of communication systems and comes standard with several connectivity options for antennas. Moreover, the vehicle can be fitted with counter-IED equipment and signals jammers.

=== Equipment ===
The VECTOR is fitted with blackout lighting and infrared lighting for tactical situations that require the usage of night-vision goggles.

The rear and sides of the vehicle are fitted with external weapon mounts for personal weapons, such as the HK416, and short-range anti-tank weapons, such as the M72 LAW and AT4. The VECTOR is equipped with run-flat tires which allow the vehicle to continue to be driven, at reduced speeds and for limited distances, after punctures. In addition, the vehicle is fitted with an electric winch which can be mounted on the front or rear bumper for recovery purposes. The VECTOR can be optionally fitted with four hydraulically powered extendable pods which can lift the rear, front or both axles. This feature allows for rapid and convenient tire changes, and quick recovery.

=== Protection ===
The standard variant only has limited ballistic protection in the bulkhead, the front and rear doors and the tailgate. The ballistic protection can be expanded with a 'low' ballistic package, which includes four ballistic panels for the doors and behind the rear seats. The 'high' ballistic package consist of bulletproof windows and a mine protection package.

The ballistic packages are compliant with STANAG 4569 Level 1 and provides protection from 5.56×45mm NATO and 7.62 mm caliber munitions fired from a distance of 30 metres. Moreover, Level 1 provides protection from 155 mm High Explosive (HE) at 100 metres, hand grenades, unexploded artillery fragmenting submunitions and small anti-personnel explosive devices.

=== Transport ===
The vehicle can be transported as underslung as well as internal load with the CH-47 Chinook transport helicopter. To enable the vehicle to be transported inside the CH-47, the central ring mount can be collapsed through the use of several hinges while the weapon does not have to be dismounted. Additionally, the VECTOR can be transported in a 20-foot container.

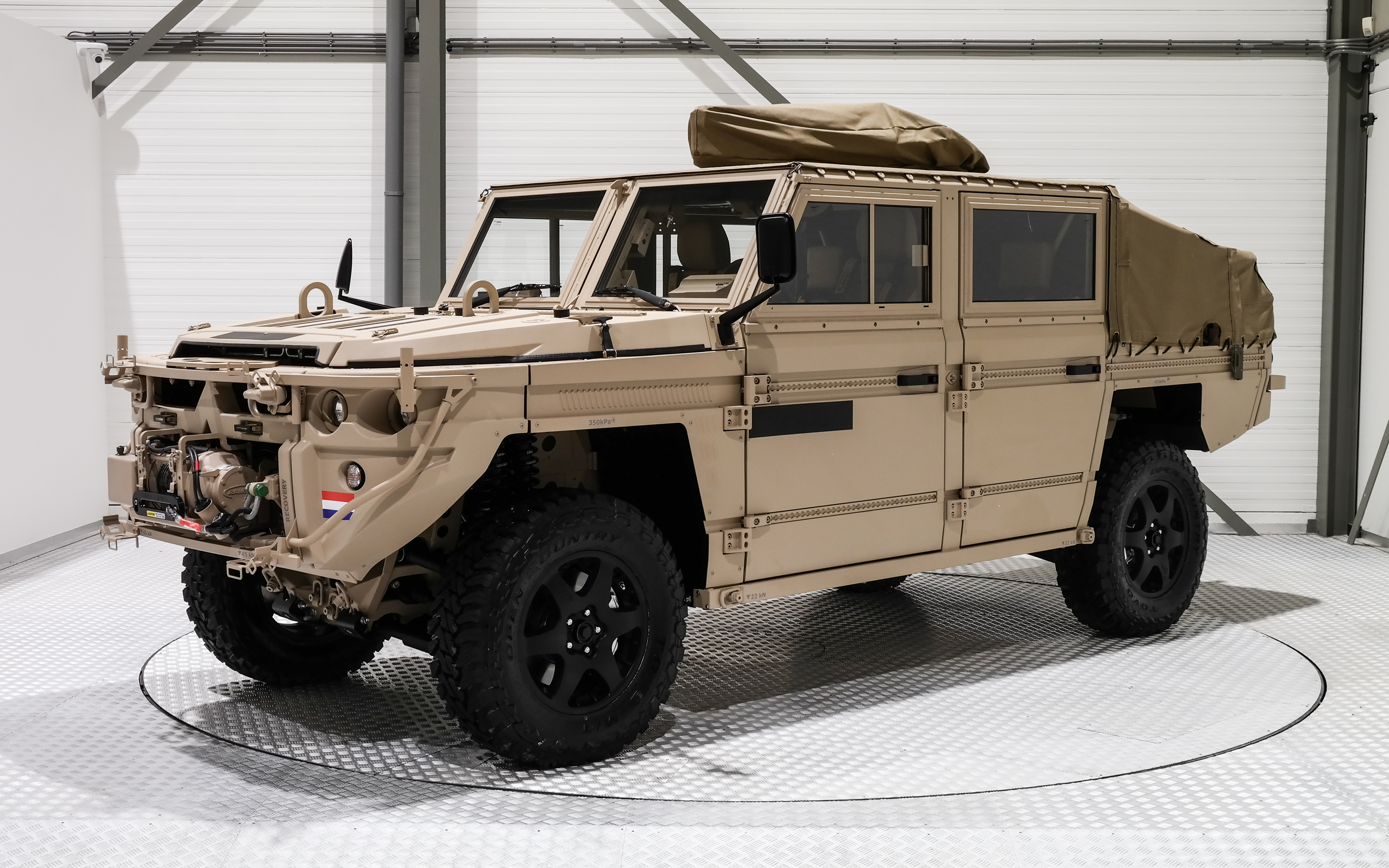
Front view

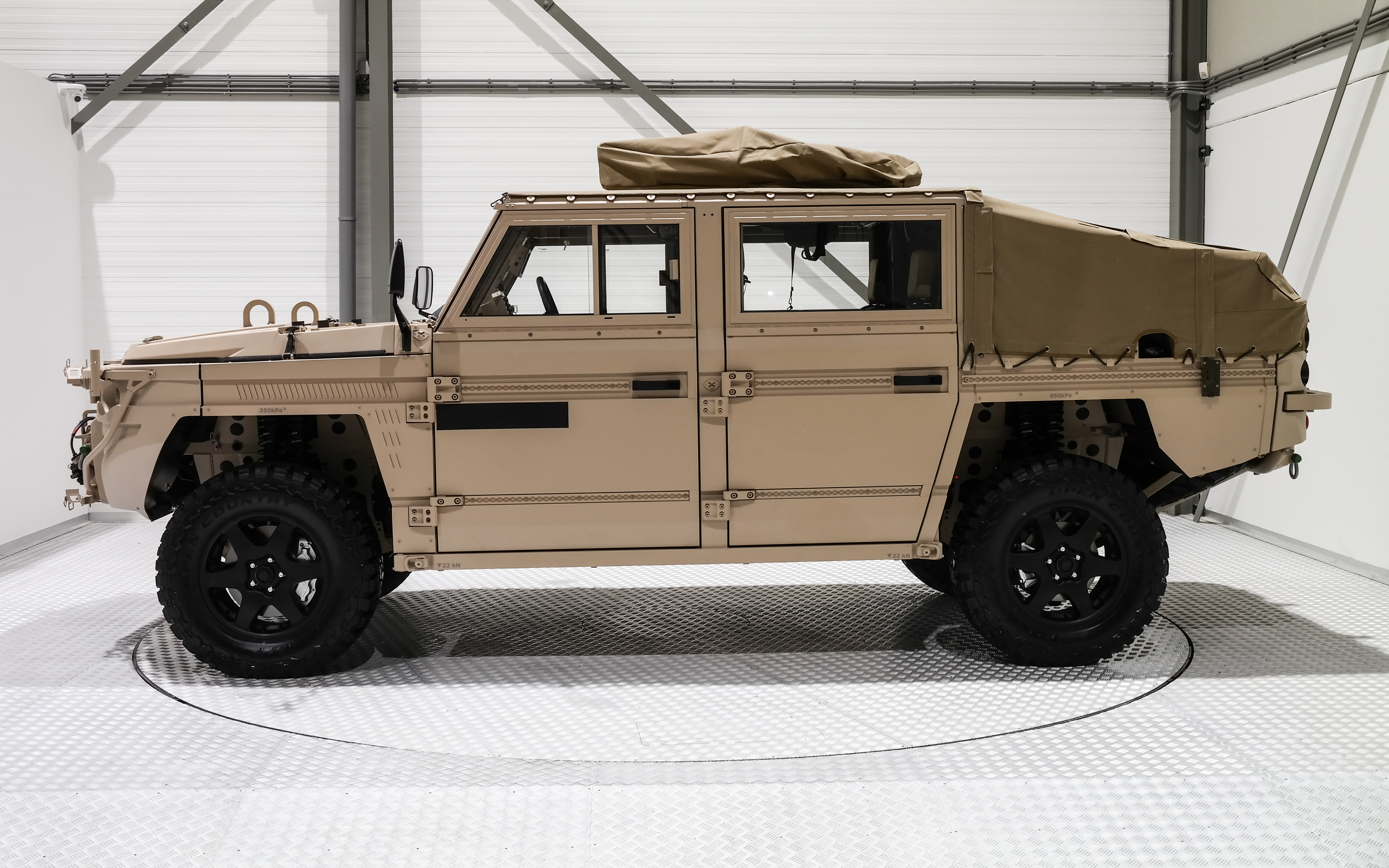
Side view

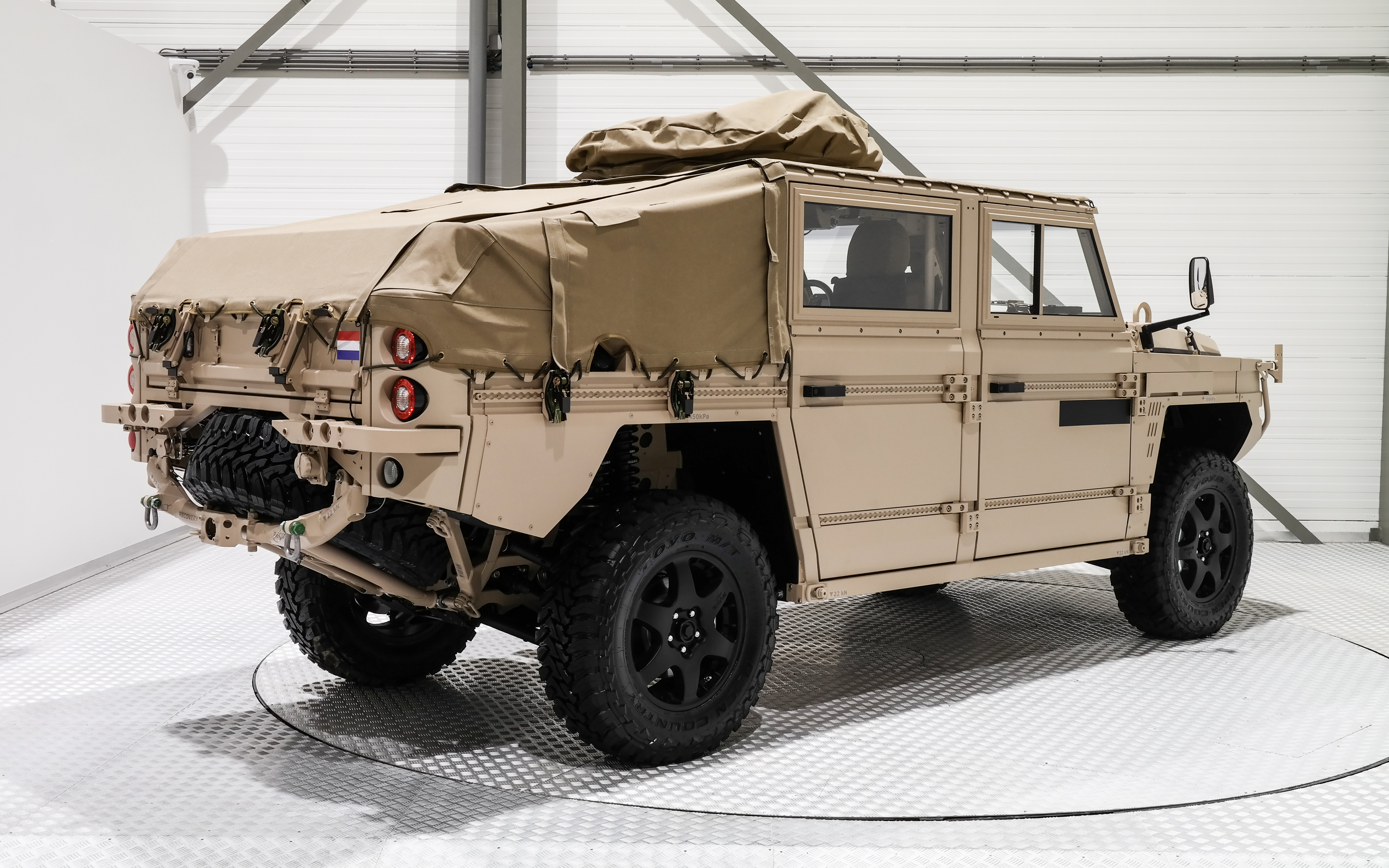
Rear view

== Operators ==
=== Current operators ===
(Austria) Austrian Armed Forces (unknown quantity)
Selected in April 2024 to replace the PUCH G 290/LP "Sandviper", purchased as the new light tactical and air-loadable mobile platform for the Jagdkommando. The first deliveries are planned for 2024.
As of June 2025, it is known that some vehicles are in service.
Netherlands Armed Forces (75 in service + 41 on order)
The Korps Commandotroepen (KCT) of the Royal Netherlands Army operates 75 VECTOR vehicles. Deliveries commenced in 2017 and were completed in 2020. While the vehicles are administratively assigned to the KCT, the Netherlands Maritime Special Operations Forces have access to the vehicles when deemed necessary by the Netherlands Special Operations Command (NLD SOCOM).
In October 2023, 41 were ordered for the 11 Luchtmobiele Brigade.

=== Future operators ===
(Lithuania) Lithanian Armed Forces (32)
The GRA (Lithuanian Ministry of Defence's Armaments Procurement Agency) announced in January 2025 having purchased 32 GRF vehicles for an estimated value of €20 million (without VAT).
(Poland) Polish Armed Forces (2 + option)
The Polish special forces (Jednostka Wojskowa 2305) decided to acquire the Defenture GRF in September 2024. In November, Defenture was commissioned for 2 vehicles with an option for additional vehicles.
(Switzerland) Swiss Armed Forces (1 prototype + unknown quantity ordered)
In March 2021 it was announced that Armasuisse, the procurement agency of the Swiss Armed Forces, had received a Defenture demonstrator vehicle based on the GRF platform under the name LAUF 20. The LAUF 20 demonstrator vehicle will be utilised to determine the optimal configuration for a follow-up order of 20 vehicles. The LAUF 20 vehicles are intended to replace the dated Serval vehicles, designated Leichte Aufklärungs- und Unterstützungsfahrzeug (LAUF), that were acquired in 2007. An order for further vehicles was confirmed in December 2023, for an unknown amount and quantity. The supplier of the sub-systems include Comrod and General Dynamics, to be integrated by Defenture. The planned equipment is:
- weapon systems
- a communication suit
- optical systems, including a mast

== See also ==
- DMV Anaconda
- Manticore
