= Welding of advanced thermoplastic composites =

Advanced thermoplastic composites (ACM) have a high strength fibres held together by a thermoplastic matrix. Advanced thermoplastic composites are becoming more widely used in the aerospace, marine, automotive and energy industry. This is due to the decreasing cost and superior strength to weight ratios, over metallic parts. Advance thermoplastic composite have excellent damage tolerance, corrosion resistant, high fracture toughness, high impact resistance, good fatigue resistance, low storage cost, and infinite shelf life. Thermoplastic composites also have the ability to be formed and reformed, repaired and fusion welded.

== Fusion bonding fundamentals ==
Fusion bonding is a category of techniques for welding thermoplastic composites. It requires the melting of the joint interface, which decreases the viscosity of the polymer and allows for intermolecular diffusion. These polymer chains then diffuse across the joint interface and become entangled, giving the joint its strength.

== Welding techniques ==
There are many welding techniques that can be used to fusion bond thermoplastic composites. These different techniques can be broken down into three classifications for their ways of generating heat; frictional heating, external heating and electromagnetic heating. Some of these techniques can be very limited and only used for specific joints and geometries.

=== Friction welding ===
Friction welding is best used for parts that are small and flat. The welding equipment is often expensive, but produces high-quality welds.

==== Linear vibration welding ====
Two flat parts are brought together under pressure with one fixed in place and the other vibrating back-and-forth parallel to the joint. Frictional heat is then generated till the polymers are softened or melted. Once the desired temperature is met, the vibration motion stops, the polymer solidifies and a weld joint is made. The two most important welding parameters that affect the mechanical performance are welding pressure and time. Developing parameters for different advance thermoplastic composite can be challenging because the high elastic modulus of the material will have a higher heat generation, requiring less weld time. The pressure can affect the fiber orientation which also greatly impact the mechanical performance. Lap shear joints tend to have the best mechanical performance from the higher volume fraction of fibers at the weld interface. Overall linear vibration welding can achieve high production rates with excellent strength, but is limited to the joint geometries that are flat.

==== Spin welding ====
Spin welding is not a very common welding technique for advanced thermoplastic composites because this can only be done with parts that have a circular geometry. This is done by one part remaining stationary while the other is continuously rotated with pressure applied to the weld interface. Rotational velocity will vary throughout different radii of the Interface. This will result in a temperature gradient as a function of the radius, resulting in different shrinkage for the fibers causing high residual stresses. The orientation of the fibers will also contribute to high residual stress and reduction in strength.

==== Ultrasonic welding ====
Ultrasonics welding is one of the most commonly used technique for welding advanced thermoplastic composites. This is due for its ability to maintain high weld strength, hermetic sealing, and high production rates. This welding technique operates at high vibrational frequencies (10–70 kHz) and low amplitude. The direction of vibration is perpendicular to the joint surface, but can also be parallel to the joint for hermetic application. Heat is generated from the surface and intermolecular friction due to the vibrational. On the surface of the joint there are small asperities called energy directors, where the vibrational energy concentrates and induces melting. Design of the energy director and optimized parameters can be critical to improve the quality of the weld to reducing any fiber disruption during welding. Energy directors that are triangular or semi-circle often achieve the highest strength. With optimize welding parameters and joint design weld strength, up to 80% of the base material can be retained for advanced thermoplastic composites. However, welding can cause damage to the fibers, which will result in premature failure. Ultrasonic welding of advanced thermoplastic composites is used for making automotive parts, medical devices and battery housing.

=== Thermal welding ===
Thermal welding can produce good weld quality although extra precautions need to be taken to prevent high residual stress, warping, and decohesion. Other thermal welding techniques are not commonly used due their high heat input, which can damage the composite.

=== Laser welding ===
Laser welding of advanced thermoplastic composites is a process by which the LASER (Light Amplification of Simulated Emission of electromagnetic Radiation), a highly focused coherent beam of light melts the composite tin various ways. Taking advantage of joint design and material properties, lasers can be applied either directly or indirectly to create the welded joint. There are processing methods that take advantage of material structure/properties to create the weld joint. Welding variables affect weld quality in both positive and negative ways depending on how they are manipulated.

==== Laser heating mechanism in matter ====
When a laser beam impinges on a material, it excites electrons in the outer most shell of the atom. The return of those electrons to the relaxed state induces thermal heating through conversion to vibrational states which propagate to the surrounding material.

==== Joining methods for laser welding ====
===== Surface heating =====
This method involves using infrared radiation to heat the surfaces the composites to be welded and then clamping until and holding the parts together.

===== IR/Laser stacking =====
This method involves laser melting a polymer post and pressing a die into the molten post to create a rivet-like button to joint materials like metals. This process can be used to join metallic joints to composite structures.

===== Through Transmission IR welding (TTIr) =====
This method utilizes one laser transparent (LT) and one laser absorbing (LA) material. Typically, the components are layered as a sandwich with the laser beam passing through the LT layer and irradiating the surface of the LA. This creates a melt layer at the interface of two components leading to a weld.

==== Effect of Constituent Properties on Weldability ====
To understand how the properties of a composite affect is weldability, the effects of the individual constituents (fiber, matrix, additives, etc.) need to be understood. The effect of each will be noted separately and then the combined effects will be discussed.

===== Matrix =====
====== Electromagnetic radiation interaction ======
A laser beam can interact in one of three ways when it contacts the polymer matrix. It can be absorbed, transmitted, or reflected. The amount of absorption determines the amount of energy available for welding. The reflectivity is affected by the index of refraction according to this relation: $R=\frac{(n-m)^2}{(n+m)^2}$, where n is the index of refraction of the polymer and m is the index of refraction of air.

Absorption can be affected by the following structural characteristics of the polymer to be discussed below: crystallinity, chemical bonding, and concentration of additives.

====== Crystallinity ======
Increased crystallinity tends to cause lower laser beam transmission because of scattering caused by changes in the index of refraction encountered when going from one phase to the next or because of changing crystallographic orientation. Increased crystallinity can cause the transmission to increase monotonically as a function of polymer thickness. The relationship follows the Lambert-Bouuger's Law: $I_t=I_0e^{-(\alpha t)}$, where $I_t$ is the intensity of the laser beam at a given depth or thickness, t. $I_0$ is the intensity of laser beam at its source. $\alpha$ is the absorption constant of the polymer. By the same token, amorphous polymers lack this trend with thickness.

====== Chemical bonding ======
Polymers absorb EMR (Electro Magnetic Radiation) in a specific wavelength of light depending on what functional groups are present on the polymer. For instance, bending of the C-H bond on the $-CH_2-$ at 6800 nm. Many polymers have vibrational modes at wavelengths greater than 1100 nm, so to apply methods such as TTIr, laser sources must produce photons at wavelengths shorter than that. Therefore, Nd:YAG lasers (1064 nm) and diode lasers (800-950 nm) can pass through the LT until they impinge on the intended modified polymer or additive that results in absorption, whereas $\ce{CO_2}$ lasers (10,640 nm) will be absorbed too easily as it passes through the LT.

===== Reinforcements =====
Reinforcements such as fibers or short particles. Reinforcing fibers can be added to increase the strength of a composite.

Some reinforcements like carbon fibers have high thermal conductivity and can dissipate the heat of welding, thus requiring more energy input than with other reinforcement materials such as glass. Glass reinforcements can cause scattering of the beam.

The orientation of the continuous fibers can affect the width of welds being made. When the welding direction is parallel to the orientation of the fibers, the weld width is usually narrower due to heat being channeled through the fibers to the front and the rear of the weld.

Increased volume fraction of reinforcements such as glass can scatter the laser beam, thus allowing less to be transmitted to the weld joint. When this happens, the amount of energy necessary to fuse the joint may increase. The increase if not done carefully can cause damage to the transparent part of a TTIr weld joint.

===== Additives and Fillers =====
Some additives can be intentionally added to absorb laser energy. This technique is especially useful in concentrating the weld joint to the mated surfaces of two materials that are relatively transparent to the laser beam. For example, carbon black increases absorption of the laser beam. There can be some unintended consequences of using these absorbing additives. Increasing the concentration of carbon black in a polymer can decrease the depth of heating and increase the peak temperature at the weld joint. Surface damage can occur if the concentration of carbon black becomes excessive.

Some additives such as the highly selective materials used in the Clearweld process are applied only to the mating surfaces between the plastics to be joined. Some of the chemicals such as cyanines only absorb in a narrow wavelength band centered around 785 nm. This methodology initially was applied only to plastics, but has recently been applied to composites such as carbon fiber reinforced PEEK.

Other additives called clarifiers can do the opposite of carbon black by increasing laser beam transmission by reducing crystallinity in polymers.

Despite the fact that both pigments and dyes can both add color to a polymer, they behave differently. A dye is soluble in a polymer, whereas a pigment is not.

==== Welding technique comparisons ====
===== Contour Welding (CW) vs quasi-simultaneous (QS) =====
During TTIr, although it takes more energy per unit length to achieve fusion with QS than with CW, QS offers the advantage of achieving higher weld strength and weldability of low transmissive materials such as continuous glass fiber thermoplastics. Greater strength is imparted because full fusion is achieved without damaging the surface of the transparent material.

=== Electromagnetic welding ===
Electromagnetic welding is capable of welding complex parts with also the possibility of reopening welds for replacement or repair. To achieve good welds the design of the coil and implant is important for uniform heating.

==== Implant resistance welding ====
Implant resistance welding can be a low cost solution for welding parts that are flat or with curved surfaces. The heating element used is often a metal mesh or carbon strips, which provides uniform heating. However, advanced thermoplastic composites that contain conductive fibers can’t be used due to unwanted power leakages.

==== Implant induction welding ====
Induction welding uses a implant or susceptor that is placed at the weld interface and embedded with conductive material such as metal or carbon fibers. An induction coil is then place near the weld joint, which induces a current in embedded in the material used to generate heat. When welding carbon fiber, carbon and graphite fiber mats with higher electrical resistance are used to concentrate the heat at the weld interface. This has the ability to weld complex geometry structures with great weld strength.

=== Challenges of welding advanced thermoplastic composites ===
The heat generated during welding thermoplastic composite, induces residual stresses in the joint. These stresses can greatly reduce the strength and performance of the part. Upon cooling from welding the matrix and fibers will have different coefficients of thermal expansion, which introduces the residual stress. Things such as heat input, cooling rates, volume fraction of the fibers, and matrix material will influence the residual stress. Another important factor to consider is the orientation of the fibers. During the molten state of welding, fibers can reorient themselves in a manner that reduces weld strength.

=== Advanced thermoplastic composites commonly used for welding ===
- Carbon fiber polyetherimide (CF/PEI)
- Carbon fiber polyphenylene sulfide (CF/PPS)
- Carbon fiber polyetheretherketone (CF/PEEK)

== See also ==
- Testing of advanced thermoplastic composite welds
