= Toray Industries =

Japanese chemicals company

Toray Industries, Inc.

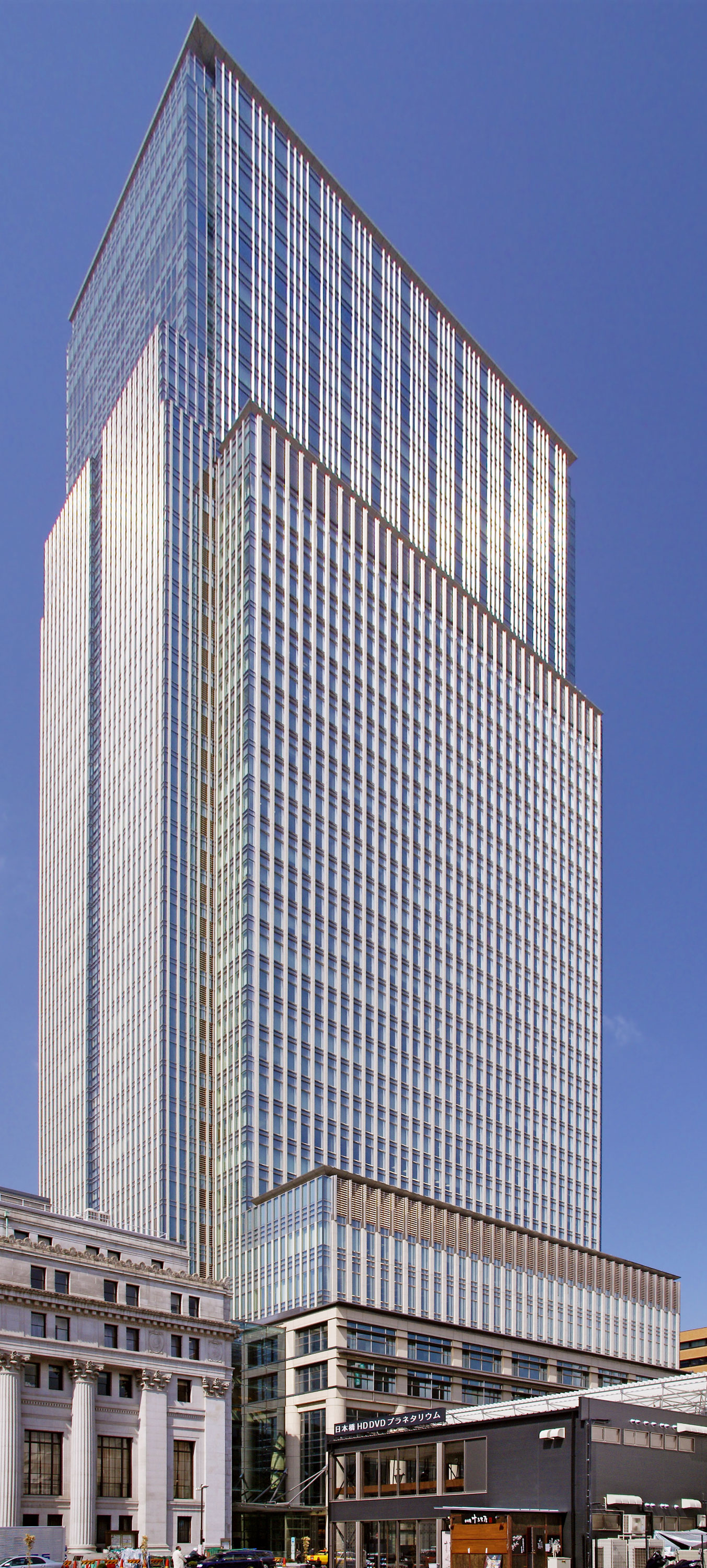
- Nihonbashi Mitsui Tower, headquarters of Toray, in Chūō, Tokyo
- Native name: 東レ株式会社
- Romanized name: Tōre Kabushiki-gaisha
- Formerly: Toyo Rayon Co., Ltd. (1926-1970)
- Type: Public (K.K)
- Traded as: TYO: 3402; TOPIX 100 Component; Nikkei 225 Component
- Industry: Chemicals; Textiles
- Founded: January 1926; 100 years ago
- Headquarters: 5F, Nihonbashi Mitsui Tower 2-1-1, Nihonbashi-Muromachi, Chuo-ku, Tokyo 103-8666, Japan
- Area served: Worldwide
- Key people: Sadayuki Sakakibara, chairman Akihiro Nikkaku, president
- Products: Fibers; Textiles; Plastics; Chemicals; IT-related materials; Carbon fiber composite materials; Water treatment membranes; Pharmaceuticals; Medical products
- Revenue: ▲$ 17.86 billion (FY 2014) (¥ 1,837 billion) (FY 2014)
- Net income: ▲$ 579 million (FY 2014) (¥ 59.6 billion) (FY 2014)
- Owner: The Master Trust Bank of Japan (7.90%); Japan Trustee Services Bank (6.43%); Nippon Life (4.45%); Mitsui Fudosan (1.19%); Mitsubishi Heavy Industries (0.51%)
- Number of employees: 45,881 (consolidated, as of March 31, 2014)
- Subsidiaries: Toray Advanced Composites; Zoltek; Mooncraft; Penfibre
- Website: Official website

Toray Industries, Inc. (東レ株式会社, Tōre Kabushiki-gaisha) is a multinational corporation headquartered in Japan that specializes in industrial products centered on technologies in organic synthetic chemistry, polymer chemistry, and biochemistry.

Toray is currently the world's largest producer of carbon fiber, and Japan's largest producer of synthetic fiber. Its carbon fiber is extensively used in exterior components of the Boeing 787 airliner.

Its founding business areas were fibers and textiles, as well as plastics and chemicals. The company has also diversified into areas such as pharmaceuticals, biotechnology and R&D, medical products, reverse osmosis big membranes, electronics, IT-products, housing and engineering, as well as advanced composite materials.

The company is listed on the first section of Tokyo Stock Exchange and is a constituent of the TOPIX 100 and Nikkei 225 stock market indices.

== History ==
Toray Industries had been originally established as Toyo Rayon in 1926 by Mitsui Bussan, one of the two largest Japanese trading companies (sogo shosha) of the time (the other being Mitsubishi Shoji). The fact that Mitsui did not allow the company to be named as a Mitsui company indicates their skepticism of the risk on the business. Risk arose from the fact that, when it was established, the company did not have the right technology to produce Rayon. It had approached Courtaulds and then Du Pont to buy the technology but, because the price was too high, it decided to buy equipment from a German engineering company and hire about twenty foreign engineers to start the operation.

When Nylon was invented in 1935 by Wallace Carothers of DuPont, Toray immediately got hold of a sample product through the New York City branch of Mitsui Bussan, and started research by dissolving this sample in sulfuric acid. Because of the patent protection, the company had to make its own effort to synthesize polyamide and make fibre out of it. In 1941, just three years after Du Pont's announcement of nylon, Toray completed the basic research on nylon and started building a small plant to produce Nylon 6. The operation started in 1943 and the product was sold, mainly to make fishing nets.

In 1946, following the end of World War II, Du Pont requested an investigation by GHQ (the General Headquarters of Allied Powers) of Toray's infringement of Du Pont's nylon patents but GHQ found no evidence of infringement, certifying that Toray's nylon technology was its own.

Since the late 1990s, Toray Industries has maintained a partnership with Uniqlo. As a result of their joint development efforts, Uniqlo has released products such as Heattech, a line of winter innerwear that converts body moisture into heat, and Airism, a line of summer innerwear made from fibers one tenth the thickness of human hair and designed for superior quick drying performance.

In September 2013, Toray Industries announced a plan to buy Zoltek for half a billion dollars. The company became a wholly owned subsidiary of Toray and continued operating as a separate business unit.

In 2014, as a major aerospace composites supplier, Toray opened a polyacrylonitrile (PAN), the carbon fiber precursor, production line in Lacq, south-western France.

In November 2017, Toray admitted to committing 149 quality data falsifications between 2008 and 2016, including on tests run on tire-strengthening cords. As clients to Toray, the companies Boeing and Uniqlo may have been affected.

== Operations ==
- The world headquarters is in the Nihonbashi Mitsui Tower, 1-1, Nihonbashi-Muromachi 2-chome, Chūō, Tokyo, Japan
- Toray has operations in 20 countries and regions: Japan, Mainland China, Hong Kong, Taiwan, South Korea, Indonesia, Malaysia (Penfibre SDN Berhad), Singapore, Thailand, India, Czech Republic, France, Germany, Italy, Netherlands, Switzerland, United Kingdom, Mexico, and the United States

In 2013, Toray acquired an approximately 13% stake in Spectral Diagnostics, a Canadian pharmaceutical company focused on sepsis.

In 2018, Toray announced it would acquire TenCate Advanced Composites to advance carbon fiber production capabilities.

== Gallery ==
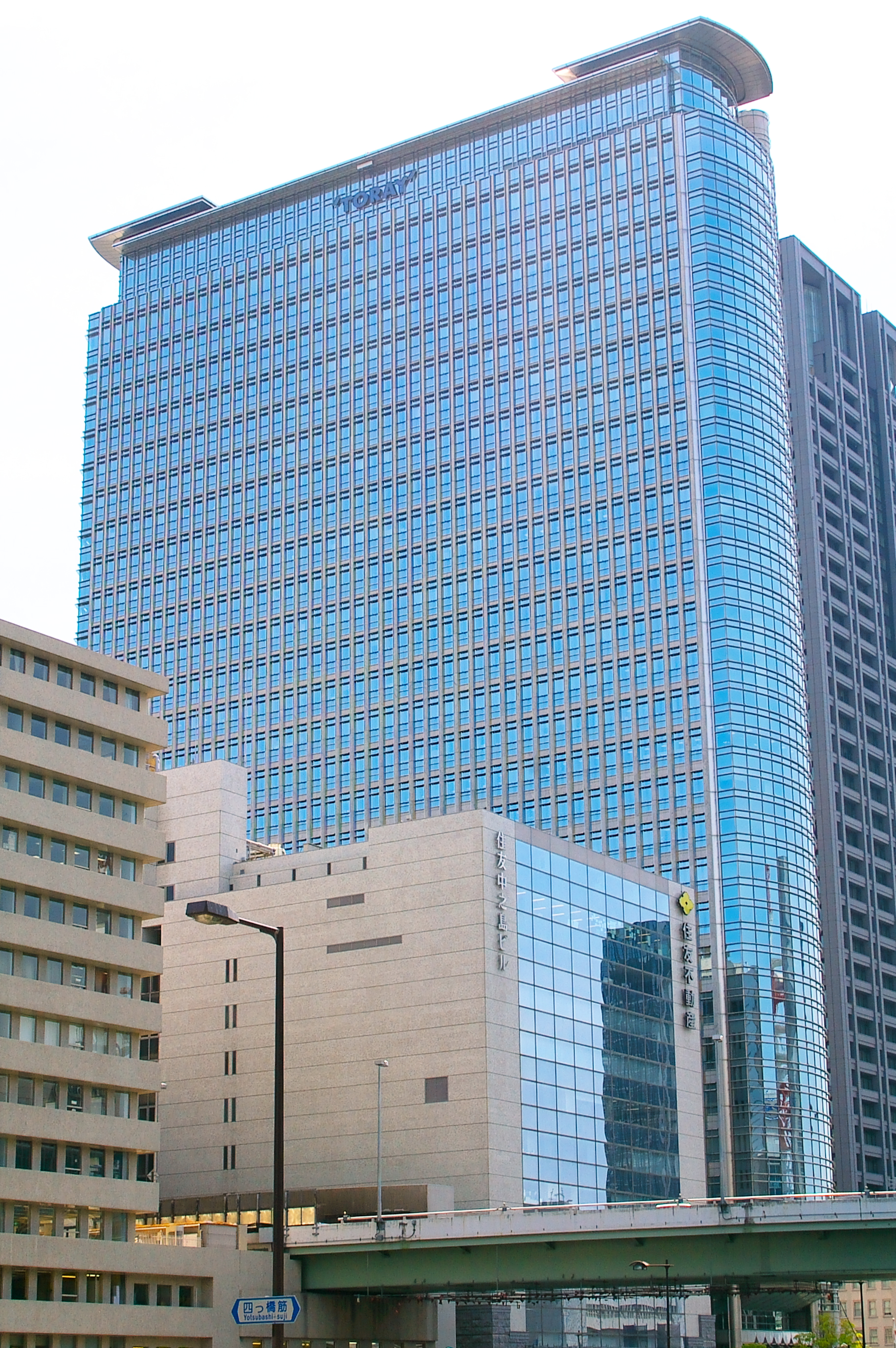
Nakanoshima Mitsui Building, Osaka head office of Toray, in Kita-ku, Osaka

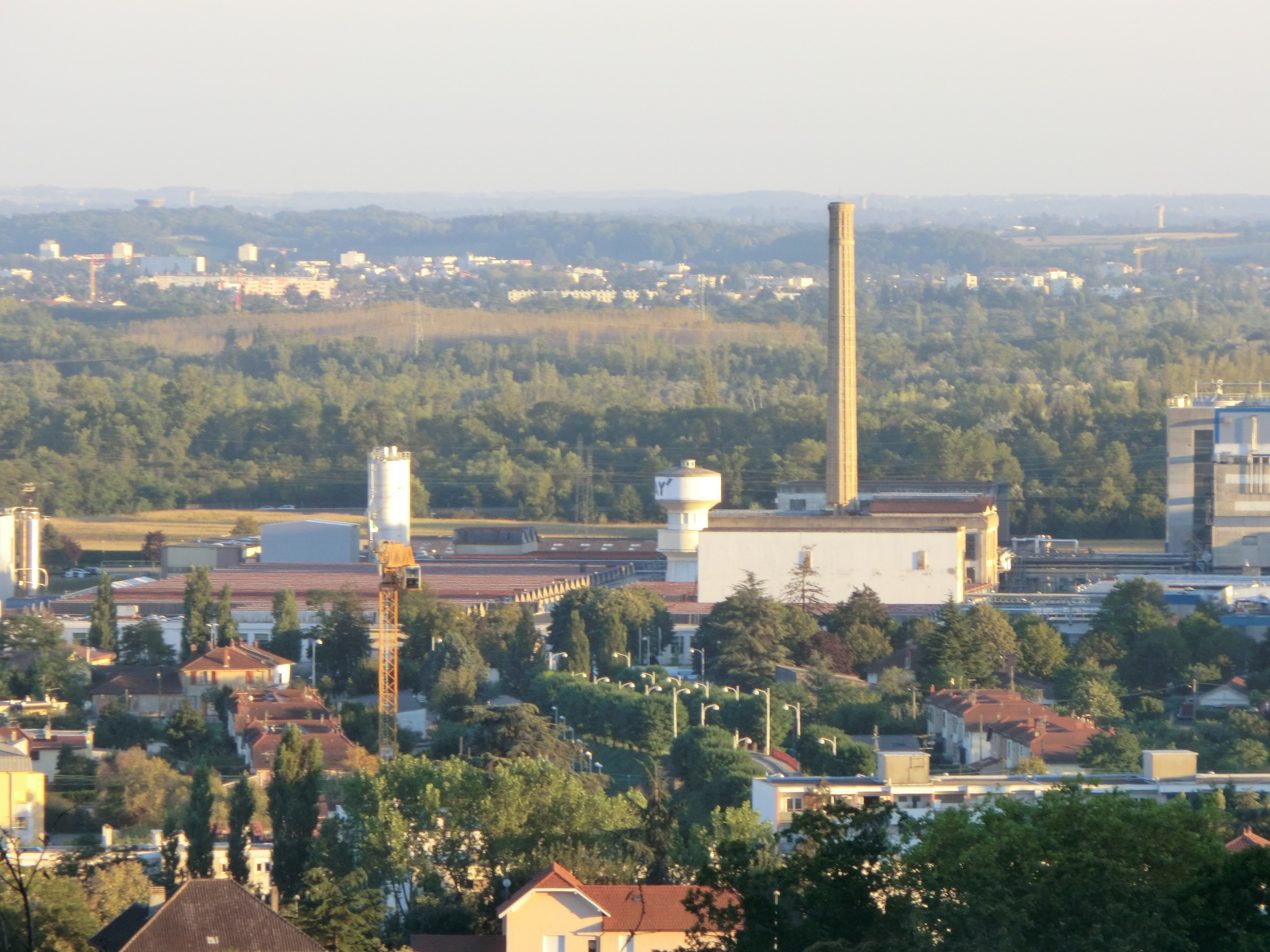
The company's plant in Saint-Maurice-de-Beynost, France

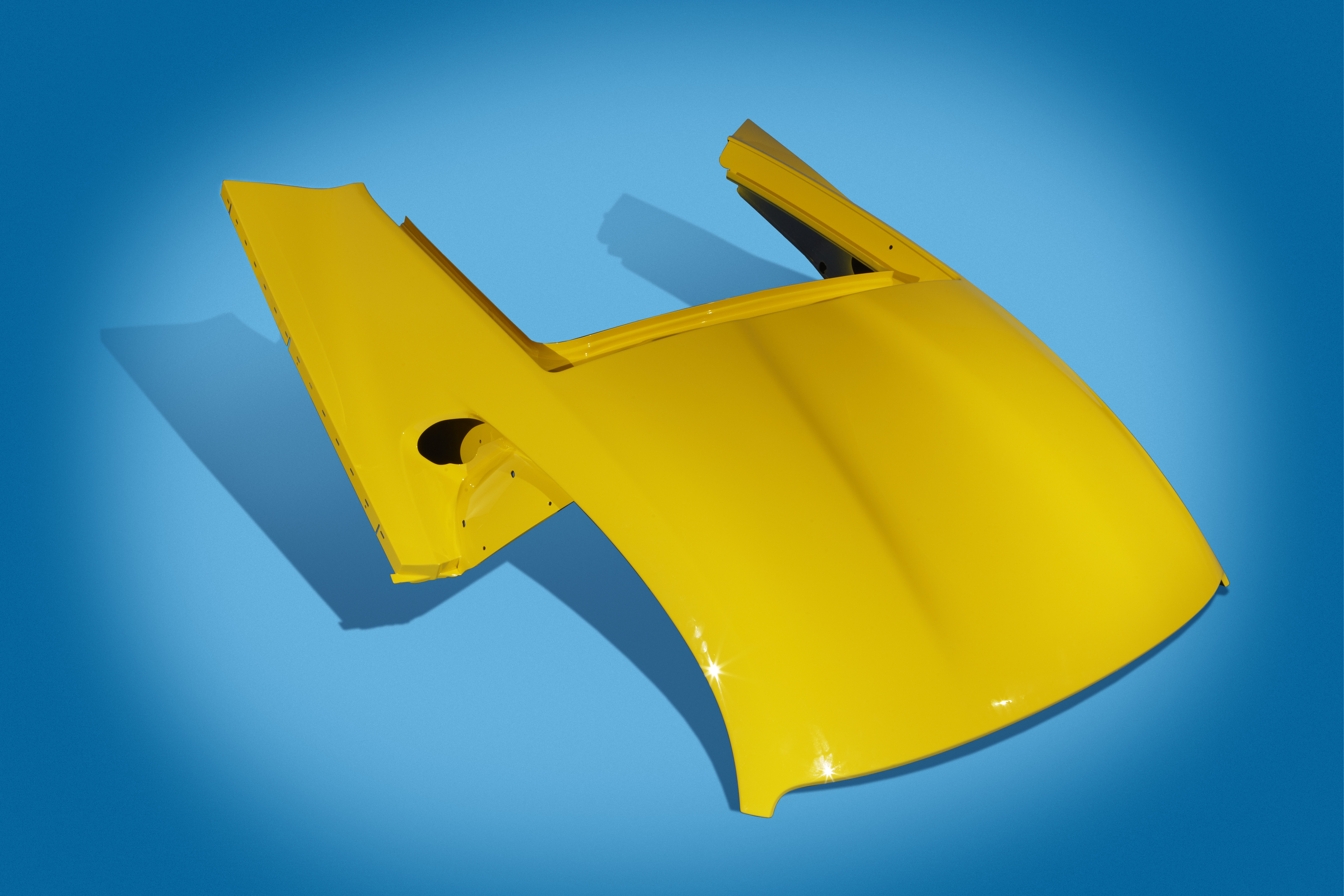
A roof assembly for the SRT Viper from Toray made carbon fiber composite material

== See also ==
- Composite material
- Textile manufacturing
- Alcantara (material)
- Mitsubishi X-2
