= Defender M =

Flame-resistant fabric used by US armed forces

TenCate Defender M is a flame-resistant fabric used by both the United States Army and Marine Corps as the uniform material for ground troops in Iraq and Afghanistan because of new war threats like improvised explosive devices (IEDs). The fabric has a proprietary blend of fibers which provides intrinsic flame-resistant qualities which protect soldiers from flame and high-temperature heat. Mike Sloane of PEO Soldier, the U.S. Army's acquisition organization, "The burn rate has gone down significantly. We find that the soldiers who were wearing flame-resistant uniforms have sustained nearly no burns."

== Product history ==
TenCate Defender M was invented in 2006 in response to increased burn threats in combat. After extensive evaluation, Defender M was selected for the Fire Resistant Army Combat Uniform (FR-ACU) and the Marine Corps' Flame Resistant Organizational Gear (FROG) programs in 2007.

Currently, TenCate Defender M is worn by United States deployed ground troops and provides flame protection with fabric that self-extinguishes when exposed to fire or flame.

== Properties ==
The fabric is composed of very stable polymers that do not react with other substances, and therefore, self-extinguishes when exposed to fire. The fabric does not melt or drip – which ensures that the fabric will not stick to skin or intensify injury.

In addition to being flame resistant, Defender M is also lightweight and breathable. The fabric wicks away perspiration which minimizes discomfort while in use. The flame-resistant qualities of Defender M are built into the fabric and do not wash or wear out.
