= Penfibre =

Penfibre Sdn. Bhd.
- Company type: Private Limited Company
- Industry: polyester staple fibres.
- Founded: 1973 (Fibre Division); 1997 (Film Division)
- Headquarters: Perai, Central Seberang Perai, Penang, Malaysia
- Area served: Malaysia
- Key people: Hiroshi Yoshimura (Managing Director of Toray Groups Malaysia)
- Products: Polyester Chip, Polyethylene Terephthalate Film
- Owner: Toray Industries
- Number of employees: 409 (Film Division Only)
- Parent: Toray Industries (Malaysia) Sdn. Berhad
- Website: www.toraypenfibre.com.my

Penfibre Sdn. Bhd. is a company under the supervision of Toray Industries (Malaysia) Sdn. Berhad, the subsidiaries of Toray Industries. Founded in 1973. In 1998, the company started to manufacture polyester film under the brand of Toray Lumiror Polyster. The plant has a capacity for producing 60,000 tons of polyester staple fibre a year. The company was divided into 2 different divisions, Penfibre Film and Penfibre Fibre.

== History ==
- 1973 - Establishment of Penfibre Sdn. Berhad (Malaysia) - Fibre Division
- 1974 - The first polyester staple fibre factory in ASEAN began its production.
- 1997 - Established of Penfibre Sdn. Berhad (Malaysia) - Film Division
- 1998 - Film Division started commence production for Polyester Film "Lumirror"

== Division ==
=== Penfibre Film Division ===
Specialized in BOPET (POLYESTER) FILM manufacturing plant under the trademark of Lumirror.

=== Penfibre Fibre Division ===
Has a capacity for producing 60,000 tons of polyester staple fibre a year.
