= Testing of advanced thermoplastic composite welds =

Welding of advanced thermoplastic composites is a beneficial method of joining these materials compared to mechanical fastening and adhesive bonding. Mechanical fastening requires intense labor, and creates stress concentrations, while adhesive bonding requires extensive surface preparation, and long curing cycles. Welding these materials is a cost-effective method of joining concerning preparation and execution, and these materials retain their properties upon cooling, so no post processing is necessary. These materials are widely used in the aerospace industry to reduce weight of a part while keeping strength.

For many industries there are codes and standards that need to be followed when being implemented into service. The quality of the welds made on these materials are important in ensuring people receive safe products. There are not codes made specifically for the welding of advanced thermoplastic composite welds, so the codes for adhesive bonding of plastics and metals are slightly altered, and used in order to properly test these materials. Even though the joining method is different these materials have mechanical requirements they need to meet.

== Weld testing and analysis ==
There are several mechanical properties that need to be tested to ensure the quality of welds. The testing methods talked about in this article will be referenced from the ASTM adhesive bonding standards. The properties needed to be tested are shear strength, fracture toughness, and fatigue properties. Optical microscopy is also often done to look for weld defects.

=== Testing for shear strength ===
According to ASTM D1002 The specimens tested will be configured as lap joints. They will need to be sectioned in a way that they can fit in the grips used for the tensile testing. The length of the overlap for the lap joint is determined by the thickness of the material, the yield point of the metal, and the value that is 50% of the estimated average shear strength in an adhesive bond, but for the purpose of this article it will be specified for a welded joint. The code also specifies the required capabilities of the machine used to test the shear strength. The breaking load of the specimens must fall between 15 and 85 percent of the full scale capabilities of the apparatus. For thermoplastic composites these machines need to be able to maintain a loading rate of 80–100 kg/cm^{2}_{.} The jaws of the machine must align with test specimen so as soon as the test gets started the long axis of the test specimen will be aligned with the direction of the applied tension. The machines grip on the test specimen must be 63 mm (2.5 in). The code specifies what needs to be recorded from the test such as material used, material thickness and other necessary sample measurements, and material properties. ASTM also governs on precision of testing, and avoiding bias in the results.

=== Fatigue strength ===
ASTM D3166 specifies fatigue testing methods for metal to metal adhesive joints. It references ASTM D1002 for creating test specimens. The testing machine must be capable of applying a sinusoidal cyclic axial load. The cycle rate and type of equipment can influence the results of the tests being run. 1800 cycles/minute are recommended unless otherwise specified. Tests are generally run at ambient temperature and humidity which is specified at 50% relative humidity ±4%, and 23 °C ±1.1 °C. At least 5 S-N curves need to be generated for a welded joint to give a usable range of cyclical loads on the material. The loads need to be varied from a minimal value that is ideally above 2000 cycles, to a load with 10% of the materials max strength.

=== Fracture toughness ===
Impact testing is done to test the fracture toughness of the joints welded. ASTM D5041 is used for reference when doing impact tests on advanced thermoplastic composites. Impact tests can get data for figuring out how much energy is needed to break the material, and it can also shed light on modes of failure for a certain joint. The testing machine needs to be something that moves at a constant speed before impact, it needs to be able to give a force readout on impact, generally a wedge is used as the impact tool, along other requirements specified by the code. The code calls for the tests to be done at ambient lab conditions, but depending on the application of the material this may change. Standard speed of testing for impacts is 127 mm/min, where the standard chart speed is 250 mm/min.

=== Optical microscopy ===
Optical microscopy is a necessary testing method in order to observe the quality of the weld joint. There are defects that can occur during welded that can weaken the joint or cause stress concentrations. Voids can occur during processes such as induction, ultrasonic, and resistance welding, so visual inspection is important to ensuring a quality joint, while developing weld procedures, and for using parts for service. Inspection can be done with the naked eye, an optical microscope, and more high-powered devices such as a scanning electron microscope (SEM). Taking a cross section of the welded joint will allow the joint to be inspected for defects.

=== Non-destructive Testing of Thermoplastic Composite Welds ===
Many of the nondestructive testing (NDT) methods available for testing of thermoplastic composite base materials can be used for welds in thermoplastic composites as well. In some cases, modifications are necessary. International standards like EN 13100-1, 13100-2, 13100-3 & 13100-4 govern inspection of the base materials. While these standards were not necessarily developed specifically for the welds in said materials, the physical principles are often still applicable.

The methods include:

Visual Inspection (VT) is typically the first option for any attempt at NDT, being the least expensive, as it requires the least specialized training and usually few if any special tools. Defects on the surfaces of thermoplastic composite welds can be detected visually if they are of sufficient size. Weld defects such as misalignment, porosity, lack of fusion and degradation of the matrix and/or fibers may be visually apparent. Subsurface defects may not be visible, unless the composite matrix was nearly transparent and the embedded fibers did not obscure them.

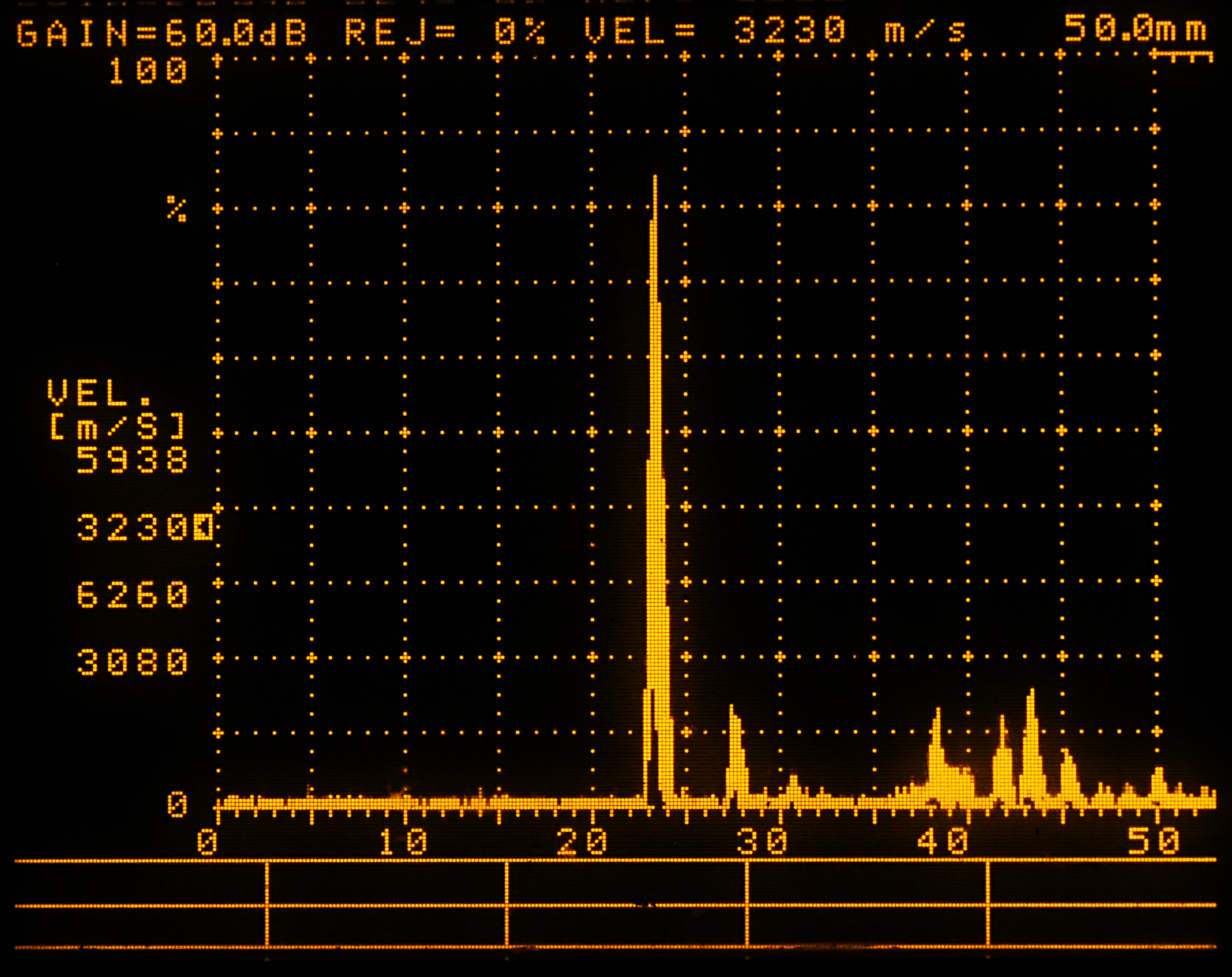
Ultrasonic A-scan display showing a reflector in the part being tested.

Ultrasonic testing (UT) can offer detailed NDT information for welded thermoplastic composites. Tests can be done with shear wave or transverse waves, though the composite materials often attenuate the signals significantly and care must be taken to account for this. Contact methods using either manual or automated transducers coupled to the part being inspected or non-contact methods using water immersion or a bubbler (i.e. a continuous stream of water through which the ultrasound passes) can be effective if designed and calibrated properly. Amplitude of reflection data may be used to generate B-scan or C-scan images, which can show the materials being welded at various, discrete depths or cross sections, a capability not available with traditional radiographic methods. Ultrasound can detect delaminations, lack of fusion, porosity, voids, inclusions and other defects mostly regardless of their orientation. Deterring factors include that the method is time consuming and the data are open to some interpretation, requiring skilled technician to perform and interpret the test.

Radiographic testing (RT) can be performed in several ways. Typically low energies are required for testing of composites in order to see any detail, which restricts the radiation sources to be used to x-ray types rather than gamma sources like Ir-192 or Cobalt-60, which tend to have higher energy levels. Data may be recorded either on film or digitally, using specially developed screens for detecting and saving an image than can be manipulated later with the proper software and hardware. Because radiographic testing relies on differences in material density to provide an image, resolution of fibers like carbon from the thermoplastic matrix is not always very high, since the density of the plastic does not differ much from that of the carbon or glass filaments. For digital imaging, the lack of contrast may be partially addressed after the radiographic images are taken, using digital imaging software. Radiography can detect porosity, voids and possibly differences in fiber density or orientation in the composite matrix due to the welding process. Lack of fusion may not be visible by RT unless it is perpendicular to the direction of the source of radiation.
Computed Tomography (CT), a subset of radiographic testing, is proving useful for the inspection of thermoplastic composite welds. CT involves the computerized building of a three-dimensional image using X-rays taken from numerous, incremental angles. It is particularly useful for the determination of fiber orientation in welds of glass reinforced composites.

Thermography involves testing the part for discontinuities that can be seen by an infrared camera when the part is heated or cooled. It offers a significant improvement on some of the more traditional NDT methods in that it can be used on large areas of, for example, airplane parts or storage tanks.

Eddy Current testing (ET) has been found to be useful for characterizing the nature of fibers and their orientation in certain composite materials, particularly those with conductive reinforcing fibers. It would not be useful for composites reinforced with glass or aramid fibers, for example, as no currents can be induced in these insulating materials. Much higher magnetic field frequencies are used to generate the eddy currents used for testing plastic composites than are typically used for metals. Though delaminations in the material were either undetectable or nearly so, more recent research has found that by induction heating the part in addition to exciting an alternating magnetic field, some delaminations could also be detected in CFRP.

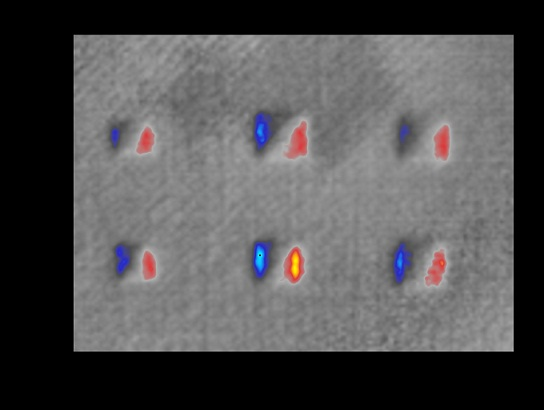
Shearography output image of CFRP/honeycomb part with artificial defects

Laser Shearography involves accurately measuring perturbations in the surfaces of a (usually thin) part under load or strain with the aid of lasers scanning across the surface being evaluated. Voids, pores, delaminations and other defects in composite welds can be detected by this method.

Acoustic Emission testing provides qualitative information on the presence and potential growth of defects such as cracks and delaminations in welded composite materials. Typically this method is used to help narrow down the locations(s) of defects in large structures before using a more precise NDT method such as radiography or ultrasonic testing to help localize and characterize the nature of the defect.
