= Zoltek =

Materials company

- Company type: Subsidiary
- Founder: Zsolt Rumy
- Headquarters: St. Louis, Missouri, United States
- Brands: Panex; Pyron
- Parent: Toray Industries (since 2014)

Zoltek (Nasdaq: ZOLT until 2014) is a materials company headquartered in St. Louis, MO that engages in the development, manufacture, and marketing of commercial carbon fiber for various applications. Their primary customers are in the sectors of wind energy, alternative energy, lightweight automobiles, construction and infrastructure, and oil exploration.

Zoltek sells commercial carbon grade carbon fibers under the Panex trade name, and oxidized acrylic fiber under the Pyron trade name.

== History ==
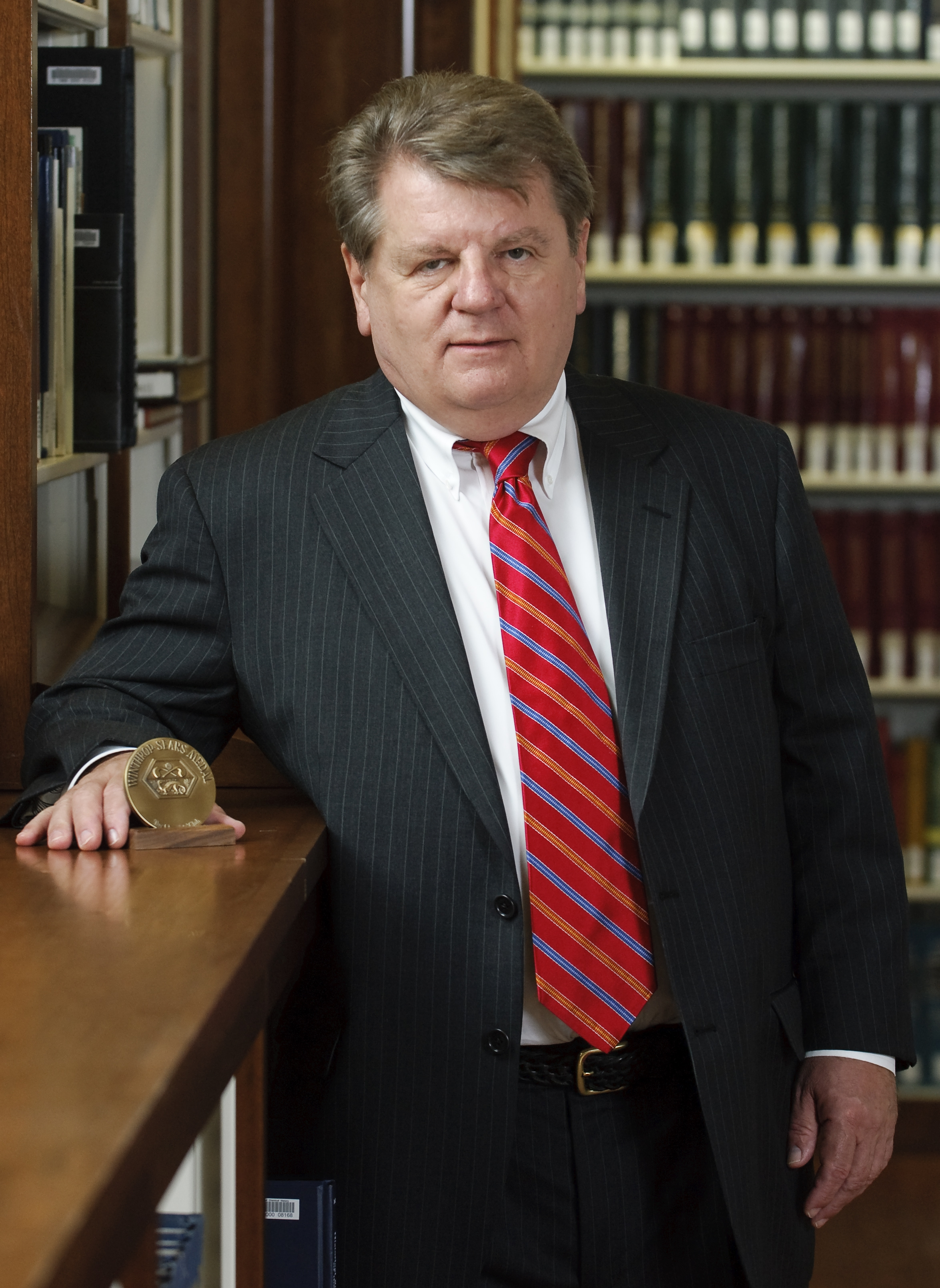
Zsolt Rumy receiving the 2009 Winthrop-Sears Medal

Zoltek is named for its founder, engineer Zsolt Rumy, who as a youth immigrated with his family to the United States from Hungary. It began as an industrial equipment and services company, and shifted into a carbon fiber producer after a business acquisition in 1988. In 1992, Zoltek's IPO raised $4 million, which was primarily used to build their first continuous carbonization line for the textile-type precursor. Since then, Zoltek has taken steps to reduce the cost of their principal raw material. In 1995, Zoltek purchased Magyar Viscosa, a Hungarian producer of acrylic and other fibers for the European textile market. The acquisition supported their carbon fiber business in two ways: First, it gave them further means of driving down the cost and price, by enabling them to produce precursor from acrylic in-house and to use the acquired technology and expertise to develop other sources. Second, it ensured a plentiful supply of this raw material to meet a rapid increase in demand for carbon fibers. Today, Zoltek owns and operates five manufacturing facilities in the United States, Hungary, and Mexico. They have sales offices in the United States, Hungary, China, India, and South Korea.

On 4 March 2013, Quinpario Partners disclosed a hostile takeover bid for Zoltek after acquiring over 10% of Zoltek stock. Quinpario sent a letter to the company requesting a special shareholders' meeting with the intent of removing and replacing all existing board members. The Quinpario offer was rebuffed by Zoltek's legal council. Zoltek's board had not formally considered the proposals, and was unwilling to engage with Quinpario to discuss the matter. According to the company's most recent proxy statement, the vast majority of stock owned by the board is owned by Mr. Rumy himself. On 2 April 2013 Zoltek announced it would evaluate strategic alternatives for maximizing its shareholder value and had engaged J.P. Morgan Securities LLC as the Company's financial advisor.

In September 2013, Toray Industries announced a plan to buy Zoltek for half a billion dollars. Toray acquired all of Zoltek's outstanding shares for $16.75 per share in cash, for a total equity value of approximately $584 million. As a result of the merger, the Company became a wholly owned subsidiary of Toray and will operate as a separate business unit.

In December 2018, the U.S. Treasury's Office of Foreign Assets Control announced that Zoltek had agreed to pay $7.77 million to settle allegations, some of which were egregious, regarding violations of U.S. sanctions against Belarus.

== Products, Applications & Markets ==
Panex is made from an abundant textile-based precursor and manufactured in a proprietary high-throughput processes that allows it to be the lowest cost carbon fiber on the market. Panex is the dominant material in the wind turbine industry, and is on the forefront of many other applications including automotive, pressure vessels, offshore drilling, and other industrial applications.

Pyron is flame resistant fiber used as an effective heat-blocking and fire barrier material. Pyron fibers do not burn, melt, or drip. Instead they char and self-extinguish. The largest application for Pyron is the aircraft brake market, where Pyron holds the dominant position in the marketplace. Other commercial applications include metal working protection, automotive, aerospace, furniture and bedding, racewear and other protective apparel, military, energy storage, and noise vibration handling.
