= Defenture =

Dutch defence vehicles manufacturer

- Type: Private limited (B.V.)
- Industry: Automotive, Arms industry
- Founded: 2013
- Founder: Gerard Rond
- Headquarters: Tiel, Netherlands
- Key people: Henk van der Scheer (CEO)
- Products: Military vehicles
- Website: www.defenture.com

Defenture B.V. is a defence company based in Tiel, the Netherlands that develops and produces specialist vehicles for military purposes. Defenture was established when it won the tender for the replacement of the Mercedes-Benz G280 CDI fleet of the Royal Netherlands Army's special forces, the Korps Commandotroepen.

== History ==
In 2013, the Dutch Ministry of Defence launched a procurement program aimed at replacing the Mercedes-Benz G280 CDI fleet of the KCT. While experiences with the Mercedes-Benz vehicles in Afghanistan and Mali were generally satisfactory, the vehicles lacked power, payload capacity and clearance deemed necessary for the SOF Mobility Concept. In addition to the engine and payload requirements, the replacement vehicles should be transportable in and under the CH-47 Chinook transport helicopters of the Royal Netherlands Air Force. Dutch entrepreneur Gerard Rond, who had extensive experience in the rallying branch, created the consortium Defenture which incorporated (among others) VDL Groep and TenCate. The consortium developed the Groundforce (GRF) platform which became the basis of the ATTV (Air Transportable Tactical Vehicle, designated VECTOR by the Netherlands Armed Forces. Consequently, Defenture submitted the bid and on 3 July 2013 it was announced that Defenture won the tender for a total of 50 vehicles with their VECTOR offer. Other bids included the General Dynamics Flyer.

The research and development phase continued after the contract was awarded and involved close cooperation with the Defence Materiel Organisation (DMO) and the end-users. In 2014, the KCT received the first two prototypes which were subsequently subject to an extensive set of trials. Deliveries of serial production vehicles commenced in December 2017 at the production facilities located in Tiel. In June 2018, the Ministry of Defence announced that Defenture was awarded the contract for an additional 25 vehicles, the complete order therefore amounting to 75 vehicles. Deliveries were completed in July 2020.

On 6 August 2020, Defenture was awarded the contract for the development and production of 249 all-terrain vehicles. The ATVs are based on Defenture's SCORPION 6.6 platform and are designated militaire dieselquad (MDQ). Deliveries are set to commence in 2023.

In March 2021 it was announced that Armasuisse, the procurement agency of the Swiss Armed Forces, had received a Defenture demonstrator vehicle based on the GRF platform under the name LAUF 20. The LAUF 20 demonstrator vehicle will be utilised to determine the optimal configuration for a follow-up order of 20 vehicles.

In June 2021 the Bundestag approved the budget for the development of a new special operations vehicle family based on Defenture's GRF platform. Budgets for an initial 49 vehicles have been approved, the total program requirements amount to 80 vehicles. Defenture will supply the Bundeswehr with four prototypes for trials and configuration optimalisations.

In December 2022, the Defence Materiel Organisation (DMO) commissioned Defenture to deliver a further 41 VECTOR vehicles for the 11th Airmobile Brigade, with a possibility for additional purchases.

== Products ==
- Air Transportable Tactical Vehicle (ATTV): The ATTV is based on the Groundforce (GRF) 5.12 platform. The vehicle was developed in cooperation with the Korps Commandotroepen, under the designation VECTOR, 75 vehicles have thus far been delivered.
- MAMMOTH: Based on the same Defenture Modular Design Principles as the GRF platform; the Mammoth is a multirole combat platform in a weight category up to 8.8T.
- SCORPION 6.6: The SCORPION 6.6 is a tactical diesel quad developed in cooperation with W-Tec B.V. The Netherlands Ministry of Defence ordered 249 SCORPION 6.6 vehicles, designated Militaire Diesel Quad (MDQ).
