= Implant resistance welding =

Method of welding used to join thermoplastics

Implant resistance welding is a method used in welding to join thermoplastics and thermoplastic composites.

Resistive heating of a conductive material implanted in the thermoplastic melts the thermoplastic while a pressure is applied in order to fuse two parts together. The process settings such as current and weld time are important, because they affect the strength of the joint. The quality of a joint made using implant resistance welding is determined using destructive strength testing of specimens.

== Applications ==
Implant resistance welding is used to joint thermoplastic composite components in the aerospace industry. For example, PEEK and PEI Laminate components for use in U.S. Air Force aircraft and a GF-PPS component on the Airbus A380 are joined using implant resistance welding. Electrofusion welding is a specific type of implant resistance welding used to join pipes.

== Process ==
During the implant resistance welding process, current is applied to a heating element implanted in the joint. This current flowing through the implant produces heat through electrical resistance, which melts the matrix. Pressure is applied to push the parts together and molecular diffusion occurs at the melted surfaces of the parts, creating a joint.

=== Implants ===
Implants serve as the source of heat to melt the thermoplastic. The heat is created through resistive heating as a current is applied to the implant. Two common types of implants are carbon fiber and stainless-steel mesh.

==== Carbon Fiber ====
The carbon fiber type implants can be further separated into unidirectional and fabric type implants. The unidirectional type carbon fibers do not transfer heat across the fibers easily, therefore, the carbon fiber fabric works better to evenly heat the entire surface. This difference affects the performance of the resulting weld, the welded joints using the carbon fiber fabric can have 69% higher shear strength and 179% more interlaminar fracture toughness, when compared to unidirectional carbon fibers. For carbon fiber reinforced thermoplastics, the carbon fiber heating element matches the reinforcing material, avoiding the introduction of a new material.

==== Stainless Steel Mesh ====
Welded joints with stainless steel mesh implants tend to have higher strength than welds using carbon fiber implants and results in less air trapped in the joint. Stainless steel wire can be placed in between two layers of resin, to avoid leaving spaces in the holes of the mesh. However, there are reasons to avoid using stainless steel in favor of carbon fiber including, increased weight, the metal acts as a contaminant, possibility of stress concentrations, and possibility of corrosion.

=== Energy Input ===
The amount of energy input into the system (E) depends on the resistance of the heating elements (R), the current applied to the heating elements (I), and the amount of time the current is applied (t). Alternating current (AC) and direct current (DC) both work in this process. The energy produced is calculated using the following equation:

$E=I^2Rt$

Research has shown the input variable with the most impact on the performance of the resulting joint is the current. The same amount of energy can by input into the part by applying a low current for a long period of time or if a high current is applied for a short amount of time. In general, a higher shear strength of the joint is achieved using the method with a higher current for a shorter time. Longer heating times at lower currents do not heat the joint surface as evenly. This can lead to the fiber reinforcement to move within the melted matrix. If the current is too high, however, it can result in residual stresses and warpage.

For a given constant electrical power, the temperature of the material surrounding the implants is directly dependent on the weld time. The longer weld time, yields a higher temperature. The lapped shear strength and the weld time are also correlated. Initially, there is a positive correlation between weld time and strength. However, the strength peaks for a certain weld time, and beyond this optimal weld time, the strength decreases.

=== Pressure ===
Pressure is applied to the joining surfaces to prevent deconsolidation, allow intermolecular diffusion, and push air out of the joint. The pressure can be applied using displacement or pressure control. Pressure also ensures good contact between the implant and the bulk material, in order to increase electrical resistance. The pressure on the implant must create good contact without being so high that it severs the implant. This is achieved with pressures of 4 to 20 MPa for carbon fiber and 2 MPa for stainless steel mesh heating elements.

== Strength Testing ==
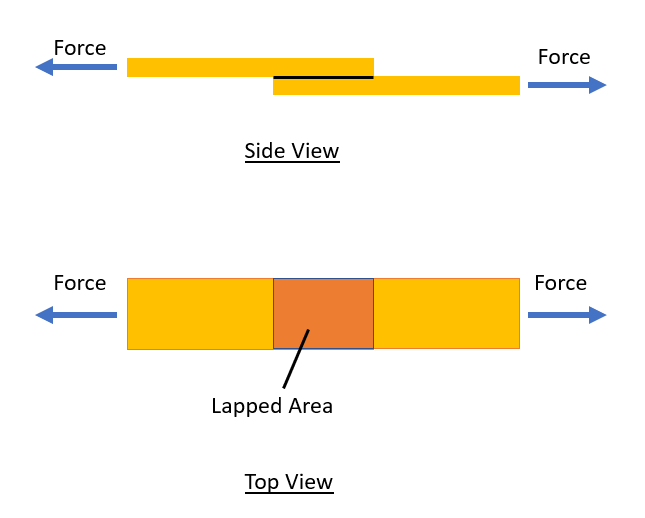
Implant resistance welded lap shear strength specimen

Lap shear strength (LSS) testing, in accordance with ASTM D 1002, is a method of destructive testing used to determine the strength of electrofusion welds of thermoplastic composite materials. For this test, two rectangular samples of the composite are lapped at the ends and joined at the lap interface using resistance implant welding. Then, a tension strength test is performed on the welded sample, with the joint surface being loaded in pure shear, a load frame machine pulls the sample until failure and measures the maximum load. The lap shear strength is the maximum tensile load imparted on the sample by the machine divided by the lapped area.

== Failure Modes ==
Interfacial failure or tearing is when the resin or laminate in immediate contact with the heating element on either side is pulled away, leaving the mesh or fabric heating element exposed. This type of failure is associated with low LSS of the sample and can occur as a result of inadequate heat input into the weld.

Another failure mode associated with low LSS is cohesive failure, which is a failure of the welded material, either the melted base material or resin surrounding the mesh. Cohesive failure is observed in samples with too much heat input during welding, which deteriorates the thermoplastic. Samples with high LSS generally fail due to debonding of the reinforcing fiber-matrix surface or other base material failure, known as intralaminar failure.
