= Ultrasonic welding of thermoplastics =

Ultrasonic welding is a method of joining thermoplastic components by heating and subsequent melting of surfaces in contact. Mechanical vibration with frequency between 10 and 70 kHz and amplitude of 10 to 250 μm is applied to joining parts. After ultrasonic energy is turned off, the parts remain in contact under pressure for some time while the melt layer cools down creating a weld.

Different join designs and process controls are used in ultrasonic welding. A sharp surface feature is typically introduced to one of the parts ensuring consistency of the welding process. Components of ultrasonic welding systems as well as the areas of application are described in the article Ultrasonic welding.

== Advantages and disadvantages ==
Following advantages are typically attributed to ultrasonic welding:

- Easily automated process
- Overall inexpensive process
- Tooling can be quickly changed
- The process is rather quick and typically completed in a single operation
- Widely adopted in mass production industries for manufacturing of small-scaled components
- The process does not introduce contaminants to the weld joints. Well-suited for medical industry
- No need to employ equipment for removing welding fumes as those are not produced in this process

Following are the disadvantages of ultrasonic welding:

- Depending on part's design, fixtures can be expensive
- While the process is commonly used for welding of small parts, it is not easily adopted for larger components. It would require more than one step to weld such components

== Process description ==
Plunge and continuous welding are the welding modes of thermoplastics.

=== Plunge ultrasonic welding ===
With plunge ultrasonic welding the parts are first secured in a fixture. Ultrasonic energy is then applied to create a weld. After the weld is cooled down, the parts are removed from the fixture.

At the start of the process, an actuator is moved to a part. This stage is called downstroke. Ultrasonic energy can be applied during this phase depending on the size of a horn used. The larger the horn the harder it is to vibrate. Therefore, application of ultrasonic energy during the down stroke becomes necessary (pre-triggering). In other cases, the vibration is applied after the horn came in contact with the part and some pressure has been created. The force is then continues to increase linearly until some predefined value.

The power rises at the same time as ultrasonic energy is being applied in order to accommodate the stack vibration. After some period of time a steady-state process, which indicate sufficient melting at the interface, is reached. At this point, ultrasonic energy is turned off. In production, this often happens prior to reaching the steady-state process as desired strength of the weld joint for a particular application is typically reached at this point. The tooling continues to stay on the part for a period of time called hold time. This allows for certain pressure (hold force) to be applied to the part. Hold time typically lasts for one half of weld time allowing the weld to solidify.

The tooling is being removed from the part during a phase called “up-stroke.” This stage takes place at the completion of the hold time. Some amount of plastic substrate can remain on tooling surface after the welding process. To clean the surface, ultrasonic energy is applied when the tool is being retracted from the part (post weld burst).

=== Continuous ultrasonic welding ===
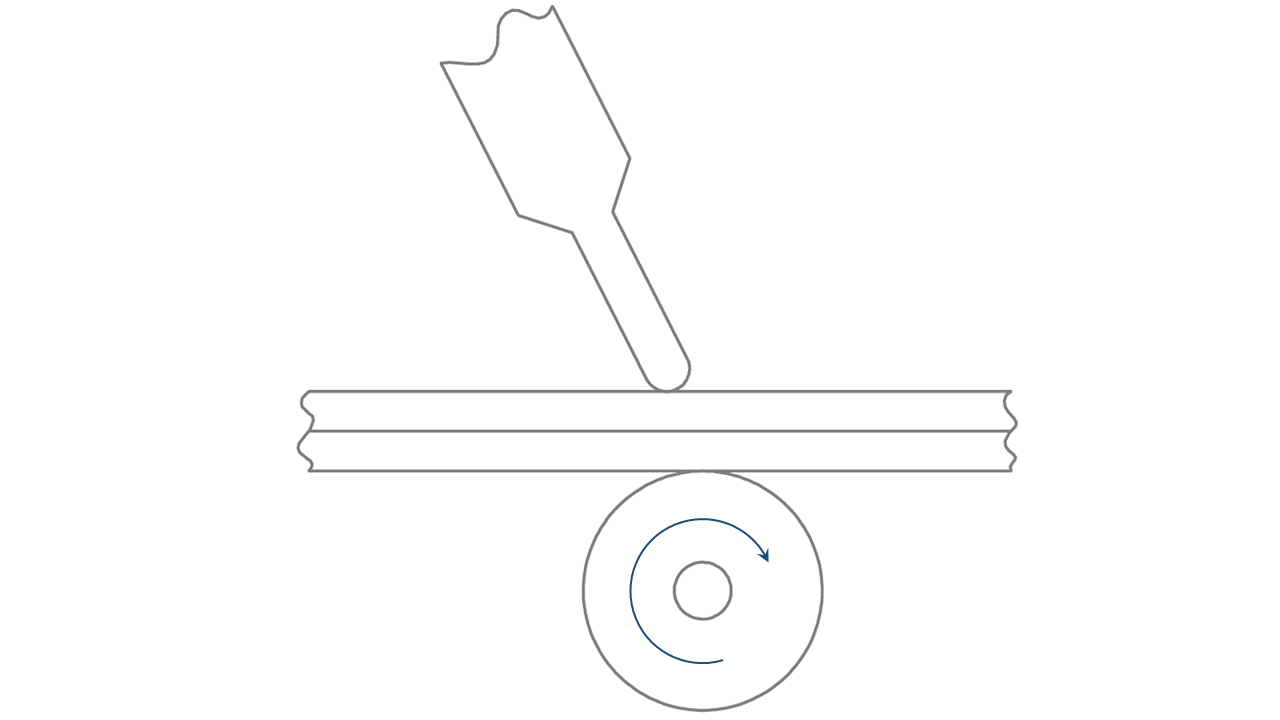
Anvil and horn

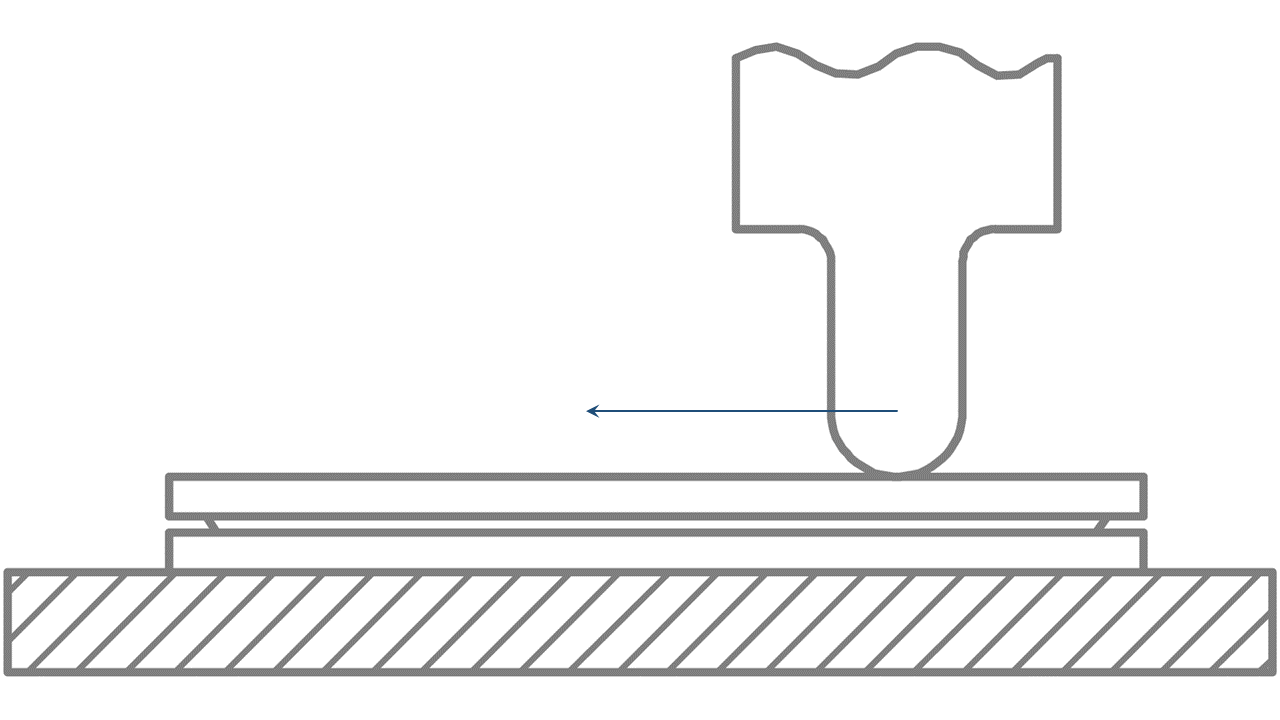
Scan ultrasonic welding

response

Continuous ultrasonic welding mode is used for joining thin layers of material and is often employed for manufacturing products for hospitals such as gowns and sterile garments, and in other applications.

Two layers of material are pulled through a space between a disk – rotary drum (anvil) – and a horn (image). Anvil's surface contains certain pattern. The weld is created at these asperities and the areas between the peaks remain unbonded. Surface of the horn is typically round, which prevents undesirable seizing of material. Round horn also allows for proper force distribution at the contact interface.

More than two layers of material can be welded at once. The materials to be welded experience similar vibrations to those in plunge welding but shorter in time. Hold force to the newly welded region is provided by previously welded section that has come out of the tooling and cooled down.

Scan welding is a type of continuous ultrasonic welding in which case large plates or sheets can be welded. In scan welding, a part is secured on a stationary table and the horn moves across the part creating a weld joint. A combination of stationary horn and mobile table can also be employed. The horn has round edges as in case with continuous welding and the ultrasonic vibrations are similar to those in plunge welding. The horn can be used to provide the hold force.

== Process control ==
Different ultrasonic welding machines offer different process controls. Each application determines the level of process control. In case with ordinary spot welds, a hand-held welder would be sufficient. More sophisticated equipment with computerized controls and built-in statistical process control (SPC) software may be appropriate in medical devices industry and other applications requiring narrow tolerances and high quality welds.

Following modes of process control are used in ultrasonic welding:

- Time
- Energy
- Collapse
- Peak power
- Ground detect

Most of these modes require microprocessor based controller while a basic welding system would be enough for time mode. Welding parameters can be monitored in real time with microprocessor based controllers.

The majority of welding systems include time mode that allows the operator to specify the duration of welding process independent from other parameters. In energy control mode, the vibration of the tool continues until a preset energy level is reached. Energy mode can be used in conjunction with time mode to improve the quality of welded parts. Certain time limits can be defined to reach the necessary energy level. Should the actual time for reaching the preset energy level deviate from those time limits, such an event would be indicative of a potential issue with the weld.

In collapse mode, ultrasonic energy is applied until the parts have collapsed (moved relative to one another) to a certain height. In addition to microprocessor based controller, a linear encoder is used in systems with collapse control. In this mode, the final height of the weld joint can also be controlled by detecting the position of the horn. In peak power mode, the vibration continues until predefined power level is reached. The final dimensions of the weld joint can also be controlled with ground detect mode. In this case, ultrasonic energy is applied until the horn makes electrical contact with the fixture that is positioned at the desired height.

Various combinations of process control modes can be employed to define an operating window and aid in quality control.

== Joint design ==
As with other welding processes, joint design is an essential step in product development. Many factors should be considered in joint design such as materials to be welded, thickness of parts, operating conditions of the final product, aesthetics and others. Narrow contact area between joining parts is essential design attribute. It allows lower energy input for generating a surface layer of molten plastic. Parts fit-up should provide necessary alignment without interference with their surface features.

=== Energy directors ===
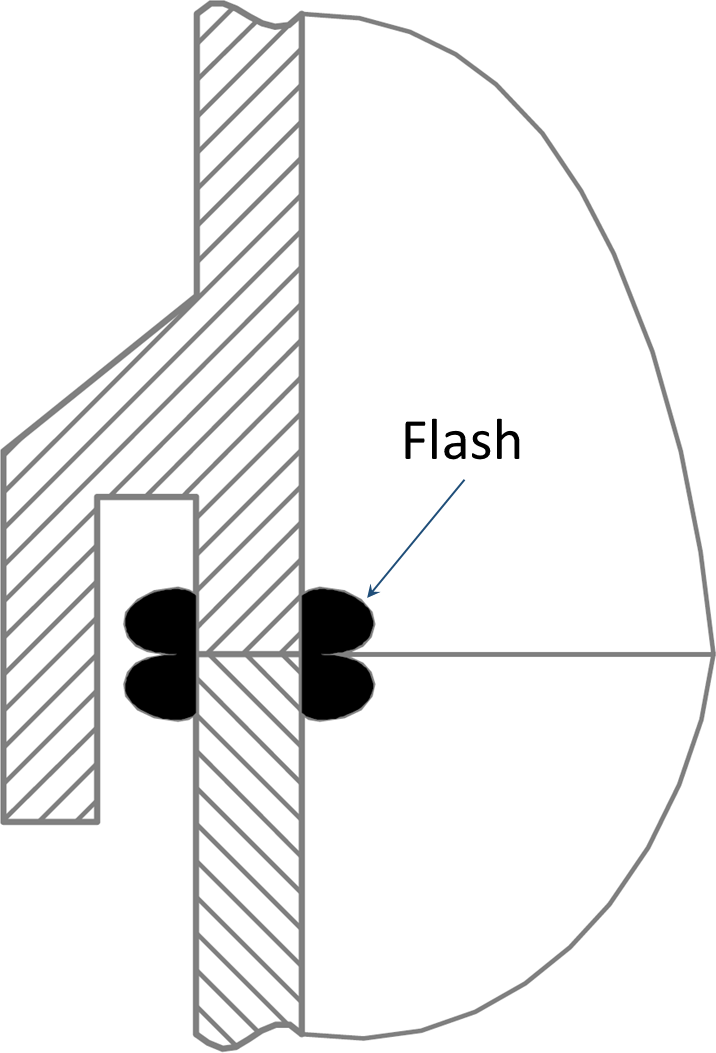
Flash trap

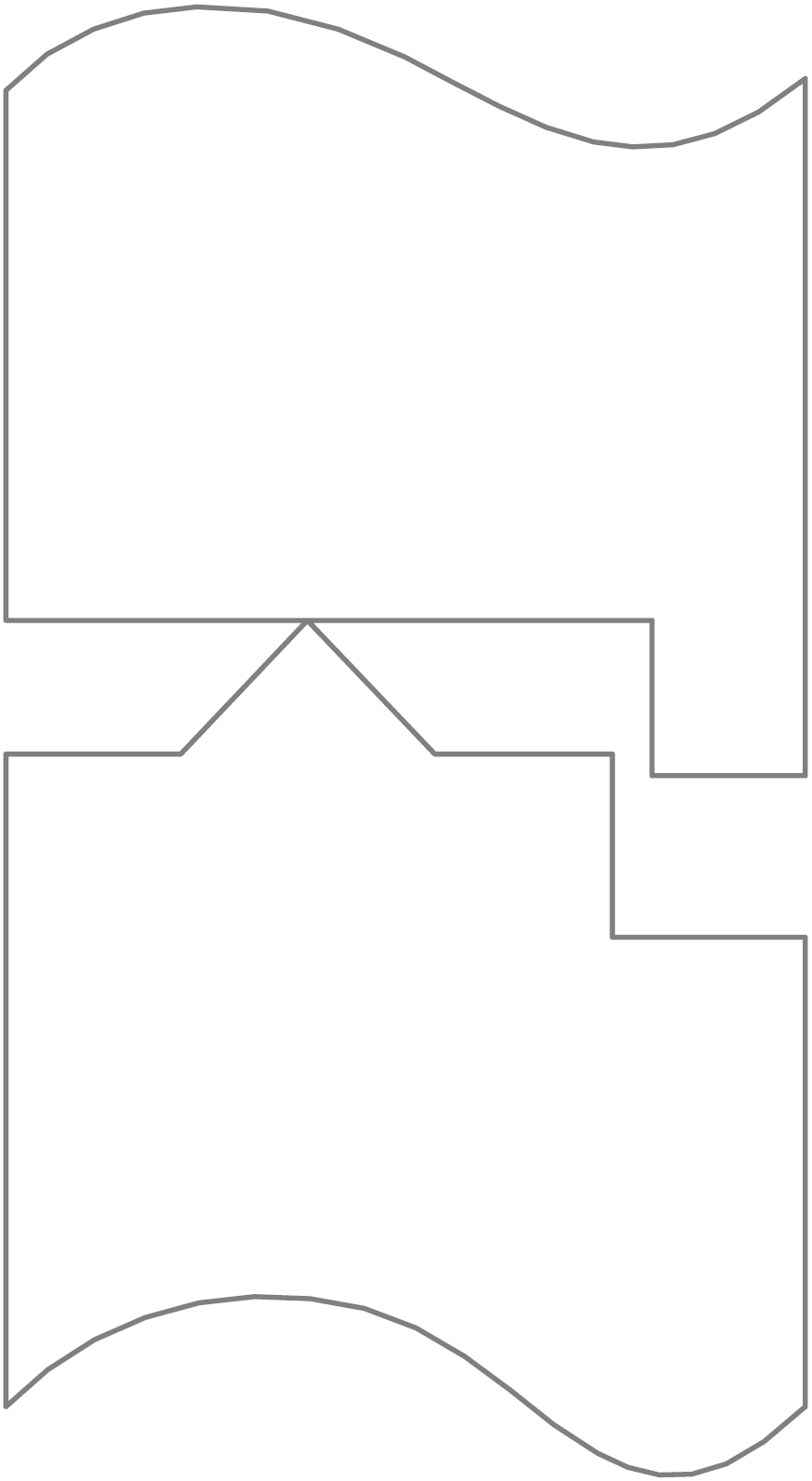
Step joint with energy director

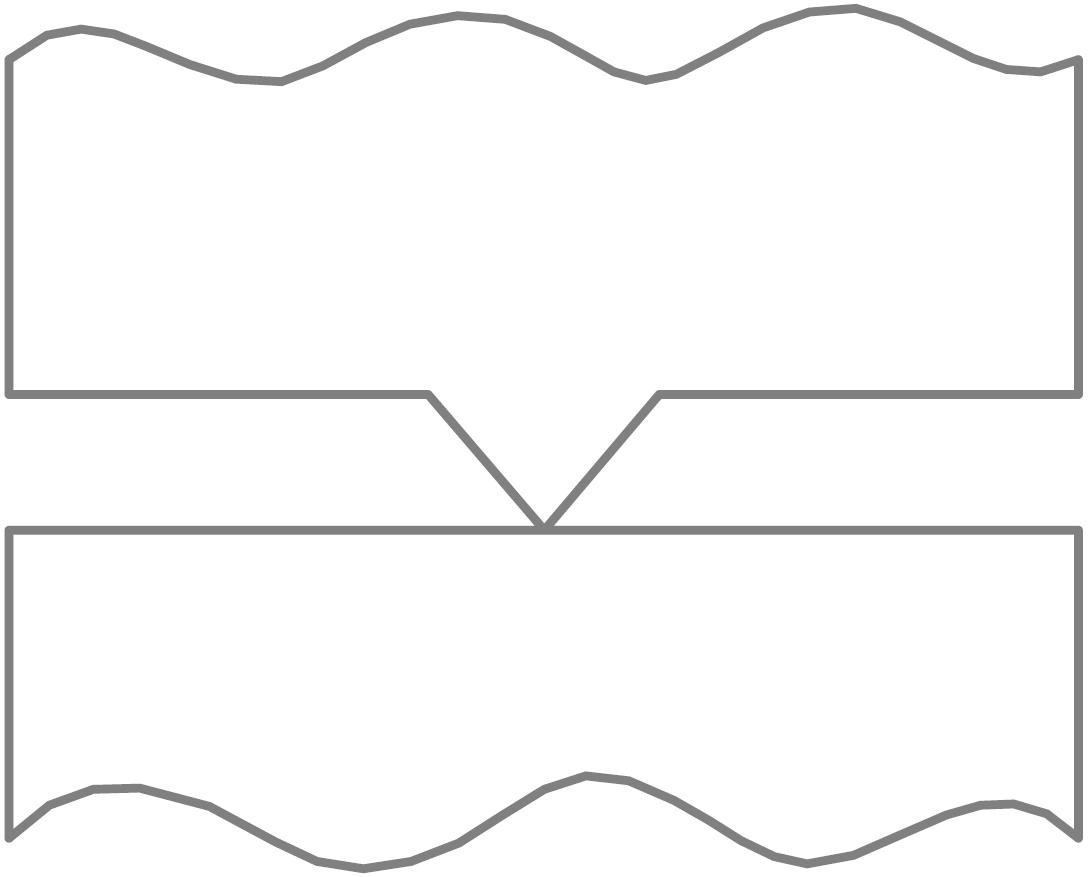
Energy director

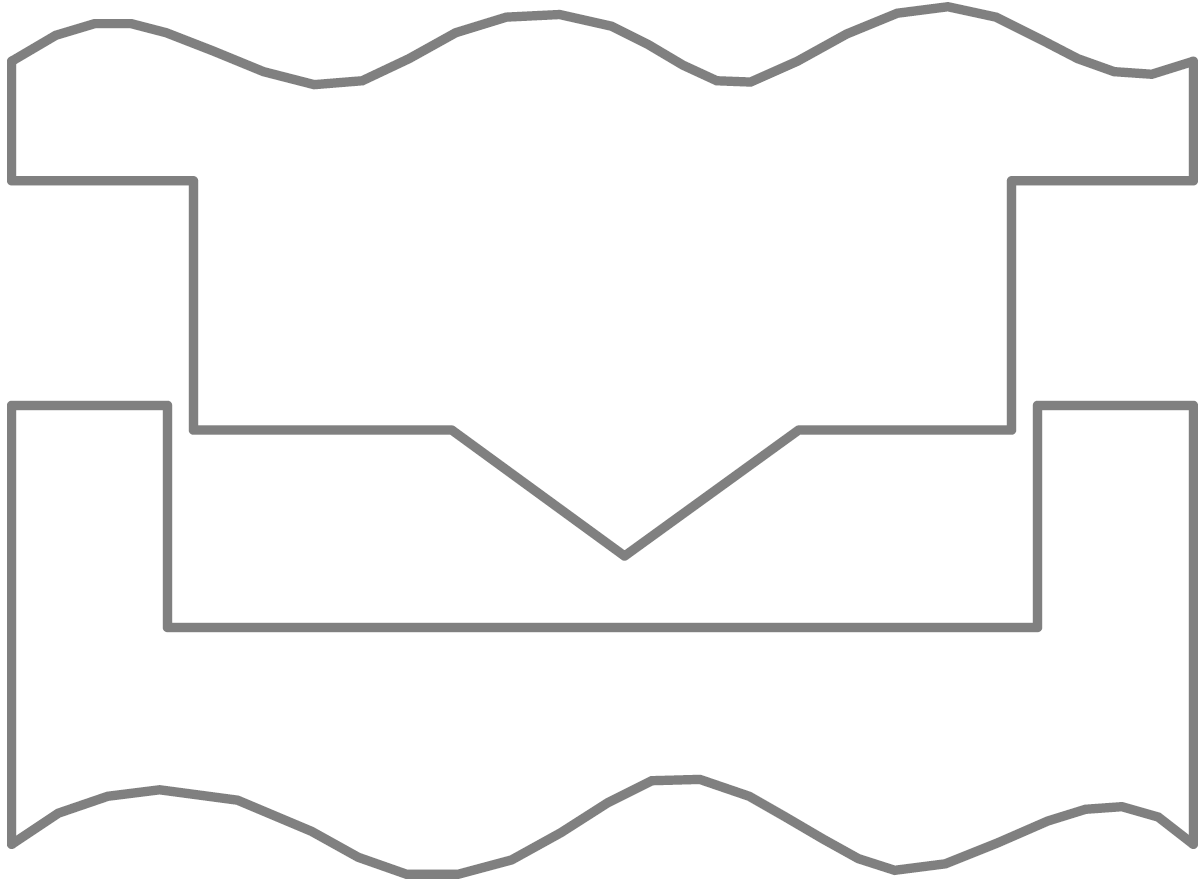
Tongue and groove

Energy director is a triangular section molded on one of the joint parts. While the parts initially contact each other through this triangle, it carries the highest stress, and is therefore the first portion to melt under application of ultrasonic energy. The purpose of energy directors is to ensure that sufficient amount of material is melted as they fill out the gap between mating parts. Energy directors most commonly used with amorphous polymers, but can also be used with semi-crystalline polymers.

While flash is commonly produced with such joint design, it can be covered with a flash trap. This joint feature conceals the flash providing aesthetic appearance. Minimum recommended wall thickness in this case is 2.03 – 2.29 mm. Since the smaller surface area is used to create a weld with step joint design, it could have lower strength than butt joint design.

Following dimensions for energy directors are typically recommended:

- For amorphous materials: 0.254–1.53 mm base width; height: 50–65% of base width; 90° apex
- For semi-crystalline materials: 0.254–1.27 mm base width; height: 85% of base width; 60° apex

Sharper apex angle provides greater weld strength and ensures tight seal. Such design also works well with polycarbonate and acrylic.

Butt joint is one of the most common weld configurations used with energy directors. Hermetic seal may not be easily achieved in semi-crystalline polymers as they crystallize faster when exposed to air atmosphere. However, hermetic seal can be obtained with amorphous polymers provided good alignment of mating parts with additional fixtures.

Tongue and groove joint design does not require additional fixtures for proper alignment. Molten plastic is fully enclosed in the groove providing aesthetic appearance. Minimum recommended wall thickness is 3.05–3.12 mm.

=== Shear joints ===
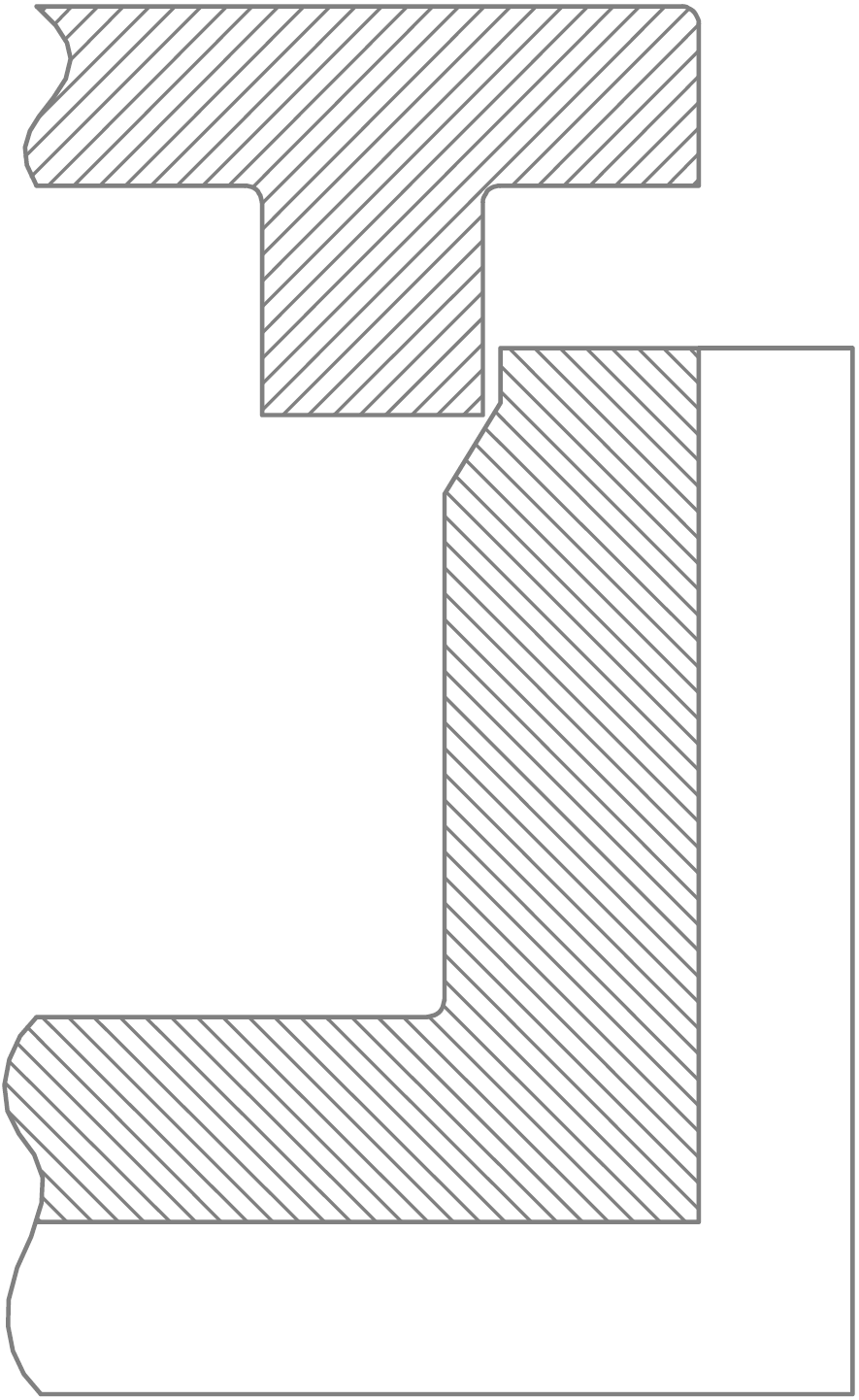
Shear joint

Some applications require the plastic welds to be hermetically stable. To satisfy this requirement, shear joints are typically used instead of energy directors. To achieve proper sealing, small tolerances are necessary. Such a stipulation could be difficult to satisfy with larger parts.

When a shear joint is assembled, top part contacts the bottom one along a thin edge, which is the first section to melt. This molten material then flows along the side wall of the bottom part filling up the gap between the parts. While a shear joint provides alignment for mating parts, it often requires additional fixtures to support the top part of the joint from deflecting outwards as it experiences pressing force from the tool. To mitigate the risk of deflection, robust design of the top part ensuring sufficient stiffness is essential.

Shear joints can be used with all polymers. They are well-suited for cylindrical parts.
