= Toray Advanced Composites =

Producer and supplier of advanced composite materials

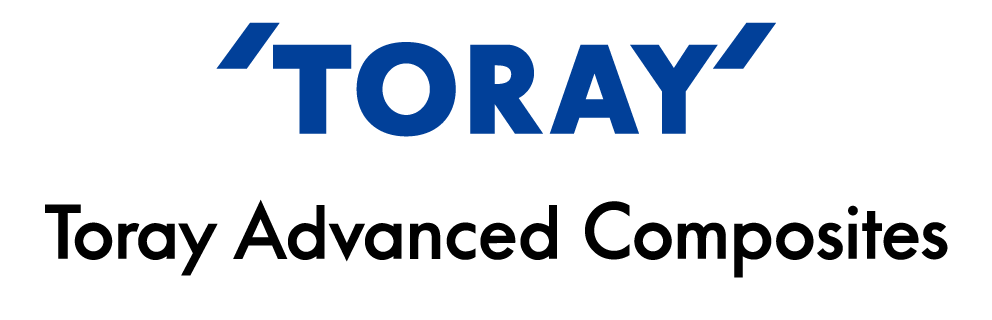
- Type: Subsidiary
- Industry: Advanced composite materials
- Founded: 1972
- Headquarters: International; Morgan Hill, California; European: Nijverdal, Netherlands
- Brands: Toray Cetex thermoplastics, Toray AmberTool composite tooling materials, Toray MicroPly adhesives and syntactics, Toray CCS compression molded parts
- Parent: Toray Industries
- Website: https://www.toraytac.com/

Toray Advanced Composites (formerly TenCate Advanced Composites) is a multi-national producer and supplier of advanced composite materials. In the twentieth century, it developed a range of high-performance thermoplastic composites and thermoset pre-preg resins that are used today in a broad spectrum of applications.

As of September 2016, the company was listed as one of the top advanced polymer composite manufacturers in the global market. It operates six manufacturing facilities in four countries. The corporate office for Toray Advanced Composites USA is located in Morgan Hill, CA, and the European corporate office is located in Nijverdal, the Netherlands. They distribute the following composite products worldwide:

- Thermoplastic and thermoset pre-pregs
- Composite laminates
- Tooling materials
- Syntactic foams
- Bulk molding compounds
- Film adhesives
- Honeycomb core
- Compression-molded parts
- RTM resins
- Defender M fabric

As of March 2016 it was privately held. On March 14, 2018, Toray announced an agreement with Royal Ten Cate B.V. to acquire TenCate Advanced Composites for 930 million euros. The completion of the transaction occurred on July 17, 2018.

On March 12, 2019, TenCate Advanced Composites announced to change its name to Toray Advanced Composites at JEC World 2019.

== Applications ==
Toray Advanced Composites' cyanate ester pre-pregs (fibers impregnated with resin) have been used on Hubble Space Telescope Servicing Mission 4, NASA's LADEE mission, as well as the first 3D woven composites NASA used in the Orion Multi-Purpose Crew Vehicle. Their TenCate Cetex thermoplastics are found on commercial aircraft manufactured by Airbus, Boeing, Embraer, Fokker, and Gulfstream, and their compression-molded parts are used in Bell's 525 Relentless and V-22 Osprey helicopters. Their materials have also been used to reduce vehicle weight to improve efficiency in London Underground's Central Line train, Alfa Romeo's 4C, and Brunel Racing's Formula Student car.

Toray Advanced Composites is a Tier 1 member of the Thermoplastic Composites Research Center consortium. Their thermoplastics are used in a variety research applications, including improvements in vehicular crash performance, new circuit board materials for solar arrays, and the development of a low-cost thermoplastic composite welding process. Their materials are also used in a variety of recreational footwear, medical applications, and orthotic devices, including a prototype articulated brace designed to allow a paraplegic sky-diver greater control while flying.
