= Iveco MTV =

Iveco Medium Tactical Vehicle
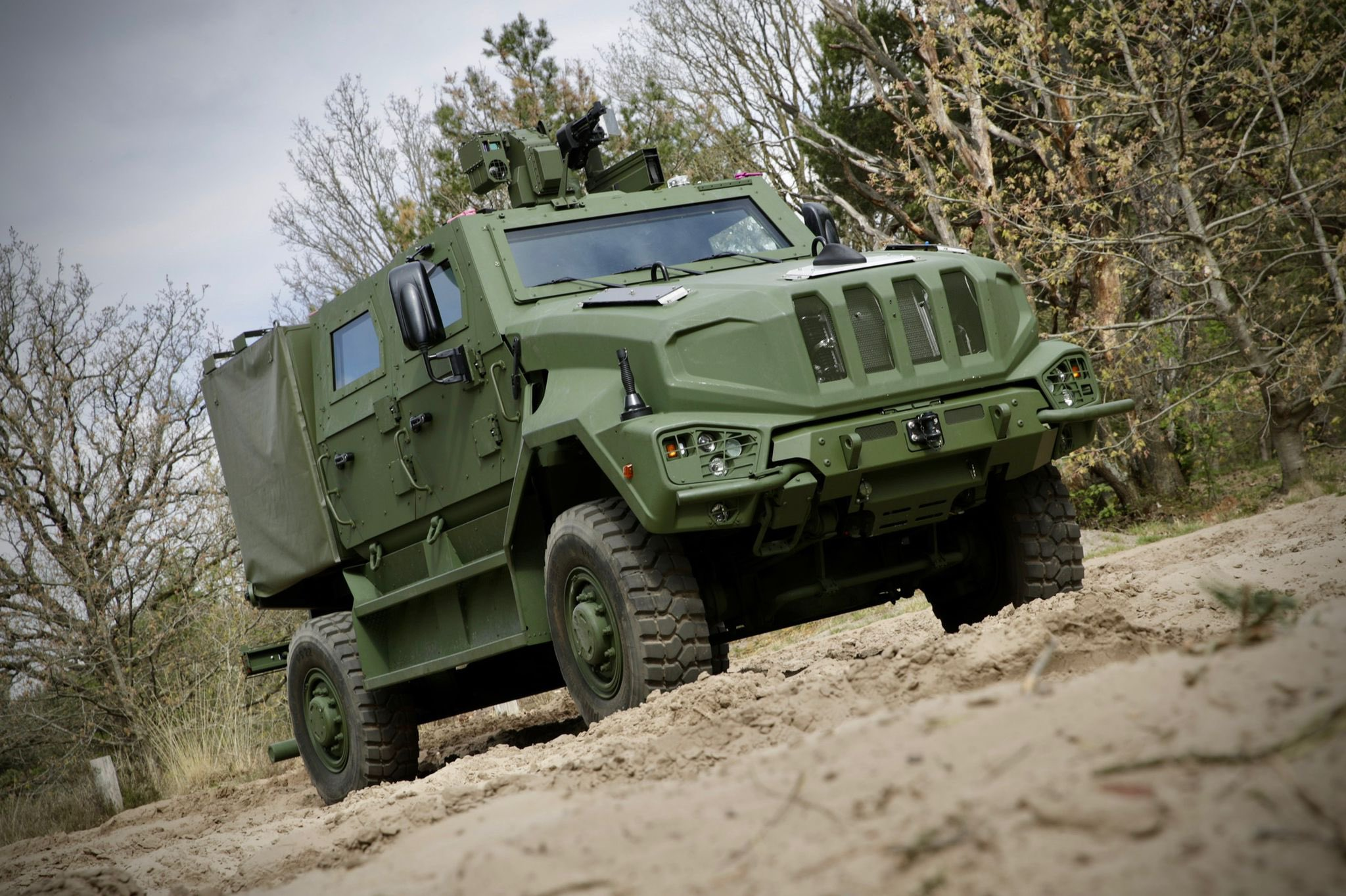
- Manticore prototype, April 2022
- Type: Infantry mobility vehicle
- Place of origin: Italy

Service history
- In service: 2024–present
- Used by: Netherlands Armed Forces

Production history
- Designer: Iveco Defence Vehicles
- No. built: 200 (as of October 2024, with a total of 1,185 on order)
- Variants: See variants

Specifications
- Mass: ± 12.8 t (28,000 lb) (kerb)
- Length: 5,900 mm (230 in)
- Width: 2,430 mm (96 in) (without mirrors)
- Height: 2,760 mm (109 in) (hard top)
- Crew: Iveco variant: 1 driver + up to 7 pax; Hardtop: 2 crew + 2 pax; Softtop: 2 crew + 2 pax; Utility: 2; Ambulance: 2 crew + 2 injured; Military police: 2 + 6
- Main armament: Hardtop: FN deFNder RCWS equipped with an FN MAG (7.62×51mm NATO); Softtop variant, manned ring mount with optionally: M2 Browning (12.7×99mm NATO HMG); H&K GMG (40×53 mm HV, AGL); Spike LR / LR2 (ATGM)
- Secondary armament: Softtop variant: lateral swing mount for the softtop variant, with a FN MAG (7.62×51mm NATO, GPMG)
- Engine: FPT NEF N67 280 (6.7 litres, inline-six, turbo-diesel engine, Euro III); Power: 276 hp (206 kW); Torque: 1,000 N⋅m (740 ft⋅lb))
- Power/weight: 23 hp/t (17 kW/t)
- Payload capacity: Payload: > 2.0 t (4,400 lb); Towing capacity: 3.5 t (7,700 lb)
- Transmission: Automatic; High-low transfer case Permanent 4×4 wheel-drive 3 fully lockable differentials
- Ground clearance: 350 mm (14 in) (vertical obstacle)
- Operational range: 600 km (370 mi)
- Maximum speed: 90 km/h (56 mph)

The Iveco MTV (Medium Tactical Vehicle), military designation Manticore, is an infantry mobility vehicle designed and manufactured by Iveco Defence Vehicles for the Netherlands Armed Forces. The acquisition is part of the Joint Replacement Programme of Wheeled Vehicles of the Dutch Ministry of Defence, with deliveries planned from 2023 until 2026. In Dutch service, the Manticore will replace the ageing fleet of Mercedes-Benz 290GDs of the Royal Netherlands Army, the Land Rovers of the Netherlands Marine Corps and the remaining YPR-765s of the Royal Netherlands Air and Space Force and Royal Netherlands Marechaussee. Deliveries are planned for the second half of 2023 and should be completed by 2026.

Being the launching customer for the MTV, the vehicle was developed in close cooperation with the Defence Materiel Organisation (DMO) and adjusted to the requirements of the Dutch military. The Manticore is being procured with the aim to provide troops with improved protection and payload capacity, as well as for modularity purposes. The vehicle can be equipped with a range of add-ons, including remote weapon stations, armour packages, jammers and CBRN defence equipment, among others.

== Procurement ==
To revitalise the ageing fleet of wheeled vehicles within the armed forces, the Dutch Ministry of Defence launched the Defensiebrede Vervanging Operationele Wielvoertuigen programme (DVOW, Joint Replacement Programme of Wheeled Vehicles). The Iveco MTV has been selected for the 12 kN category, which indicates that the vehicle will be capable of carrying payloads of approximately 1,200 kilograms. The MTV will function in various roles and will replace multiple ageing vehicles, including variants of the M577 command post vehicles, YPR-765 armoured personnel carriers and Mercedes-Benz G-Wagen 'Wolf' off-road vehicles.

On 15 August 2019, State Secretary of Defence Barbara Visser announced that the Ministry of Defence had selected Italian truck manufacturer Iveco to supply new light tactical vehicles to the Dutch Armed Forces. In addition, the project includes delivery of remote controlled weapon stations (RCWS) which can be installed on the vehicles. The contract includes the development and provision of 918 vehicles and 120 RCWS, an additional 357 vehicles and 10 RCWS can be ordered through an option in the contract. This would bring the total to 1275 vehicles and 130 RCWS, while additional vehicles can be ordered within five years after the delivery of the final vehicle. On 28 November 2019, the state secretary signed the contract with IVECO at the NIDV Exhibition Defence & Security, which took place in Rotterdam.

In the Defensie Projectoverzicht (DPO, Defence Projects Overview) of September 2020, the Ministry of Defence announced that the order for an additional 357 vehicles was delayed. An examination of the project found that the current distribution of vehicles among the service branches was sub-optimal. Consequently, a requirement for 100 vehicles was removed from the project and transferred to a new project for amphibiously transportable vehicles for the Netherlands Marine Corps. The remaining 257 vehicles have been ordered through the existing option in the contract.

== Technical description ==
Only limited technical detail has been released by either the Dutch Ministry of Defence or Iveco. Only basic outline dimensions and limited operating weight and automotive data is available, and is included in Specifications.

=== Engine ===
The MTV is powered by an EF67 EUIII 6,7L six-cylinder turbo-diesel engine, producing 267 HP (207 kW) and 1000 Nm of torque, linked to an automatic transmission. The engine has been fully militarised and is capable of running on military fuel, the maximum range amounts to 600 kilometres. The fording depth of the standard vehicles is 750 mm, the navy variants have an improved fording depth of 1500 mm. The top speed of the MTV is limited to 90 km/h. Due to the military off-road requirements of the vehicle, the Manticore has a ladder frame, leaf springs and anti-roll bars. The vehicle comes with permanent four-wheel drive and three locking differentials, the MTV's disc brakes are combined with an anti-lock braking system. Tyre pressure of the 365/85R20 Pirelli PS22 tyres can be adjusted via the central tyre inflation system, operated from within the cabin.

=== Body ===
The Manticore will be procured in five primary variants – the bodywork of all variants is made of armoured steel with a high degree of Brinell hardness. The hardtop, softtop and utility variants can be equipped with add-on armour packages for ballistic as well as mine protection. Therefore, these vehicles are "fitted for, but not with" protection kits. Protection kits can be installed and uninstalled from vehicles in the field using basic tools. In effect, the armour is only fitted when required which significantly reduces wear and tear as well as the related lifecycle costs. The casualty transport, military police and air force security variants come standard with the armour kits. Moreover, all vehicles can be equipped with CBRN defence systems, C4I systems, jammers and Rheinmetall ROSY smoke grenade launchers.

=== Armament ===
The hardtop variant can be equipped with a remote controlled weapon station (RCWS). The Dutch Manticores are being procured with 130 deFNder Light weapon stations, produced by FN Herstal. These weapon stations will be fitted with FN Minimi or FN MAG machine guns. Moreover, the manned open turret present on the hardtop, softtop and utility variants can be fitted with M2 Browning heavy machine guns or Heckler & Koch GMG automatic grenade launchers, as well as the two aforementioned machine guns. In addition, the softtop variant is fitted with a manned swing mount on the passenger's side. The sofftop's MRAT (medium range anti-tank weapon) subvariant is optimised for firing Spike anti-tank guided missiles.

== Variants ==
=== Hardtop ===
The hardtop variant accommodates a driver and three passengers and has a payload capacity of approximately 15 kN. The hardtop can be fitted with the FN deFNder Light remote controlled weapon station, integrating an FN Minimi or FN MAG machine gun. The rear cargo body is fitted with modular rails and cabinets which can be adjusted for specific mission sets.

=== Softtop ===
The softtop variant accommodates a driver and three passengers as well and has a payload capacity of approximately 18 kN. As opposed to the hardtop, the softtop Manticore is fitted with a detachable canvas roof as well as detachable windows, and a removable hood on the cargo section. Moreover, the heavy weapons subvariant is adapted for use with the Spike anti-tank guided missile. The manned open turret of the softtop Manticore can be fitted with a Browning M2 heavy machine gun or H&K GMG automatic grenade launcher. FN Minimi or FN MAG machine guns can be installed on the passenger's side manned swing mount.

=== Pick-up ===
The pick-up variant is a utility vehicle with a short two-man cabin and a range of utility modules on the rear section. With 20 kN, the pick-up has the highest payload capacity of the five primary variants. This variant comes with a hooded cargo bed or one of the specialised superstructures. Subvariants include vehicles fitted with workshop or command & control superstructures. In addition, a subframe can be installed to transfer existing 8-feet containers from the MB290GD onto the Manticore.

=== Casualty transport ===
The casualty transport variant is a military ambulance, optimised for casualty evacuation and capable of transporting two persons on stretchers or up to four persons sitting upright. Permanently fitted with an armour package, the casualty transport Manticore has a payload capacity which equals 19 kN. In addition, the ambulance is equipped with emergency vehicle lighting, a siren and work lights.

=== Security ===
The security variant consists of three subvariants: a military police troop carrier and command vehicle for the Royal Netherlands Marechaussee and an air force security vehicle for the Royal Netherlands Air and Space Force. The security Manticore replaces old YPR-765 armoured personnel carriers and has room for a driver and seven passengers. The security Manticores come with emergency lighting and sirens and specific liveries.

== See also ==
- DMV Anaconda
- VECTOR
