= DMV Anaconda =

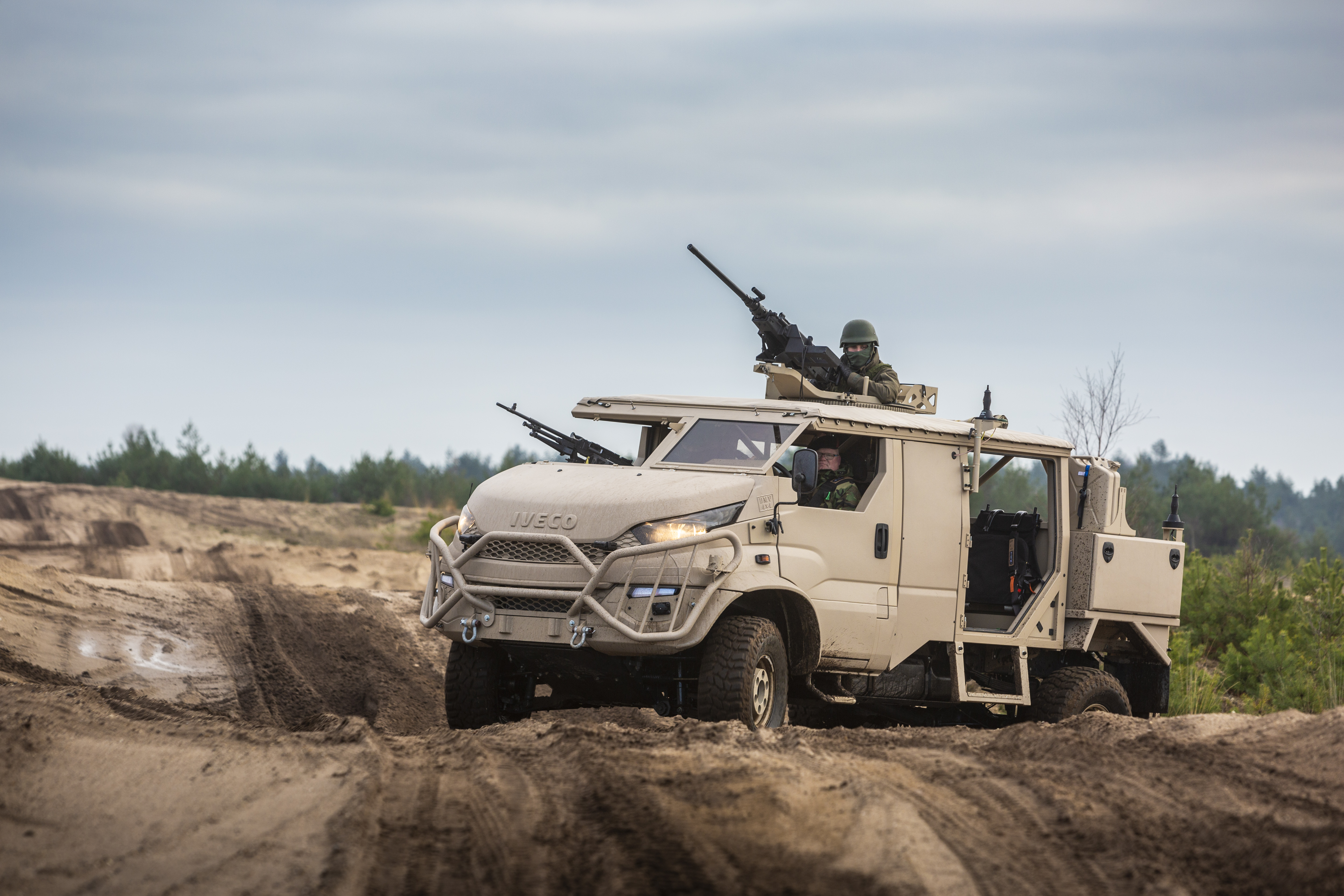
- Type: Armoured vehicle

Service history
- Used by: Royal Netherlands Marine Corps

Production history
- Manufacturer: Dutch Military Vehicles
- No. built: 60

Specifications
- Mass: 3900 kg
- Length: 5.275 m
- Width: 2.26 m
- Height: 2.30 m
- Crew: 4 + gunner

The DMV Anaconda is a Dutch armoured vehicle built by Dutch Military Vehicles (DMV). It is based on the Iveco Daily 4x4 and specially designed for service in the Dutch Caribbean. The vehicle replaces the Mercedes-Benz G280 CDI’s and Unimogs of the Royal Netherlands Marine Corps.

== History ==
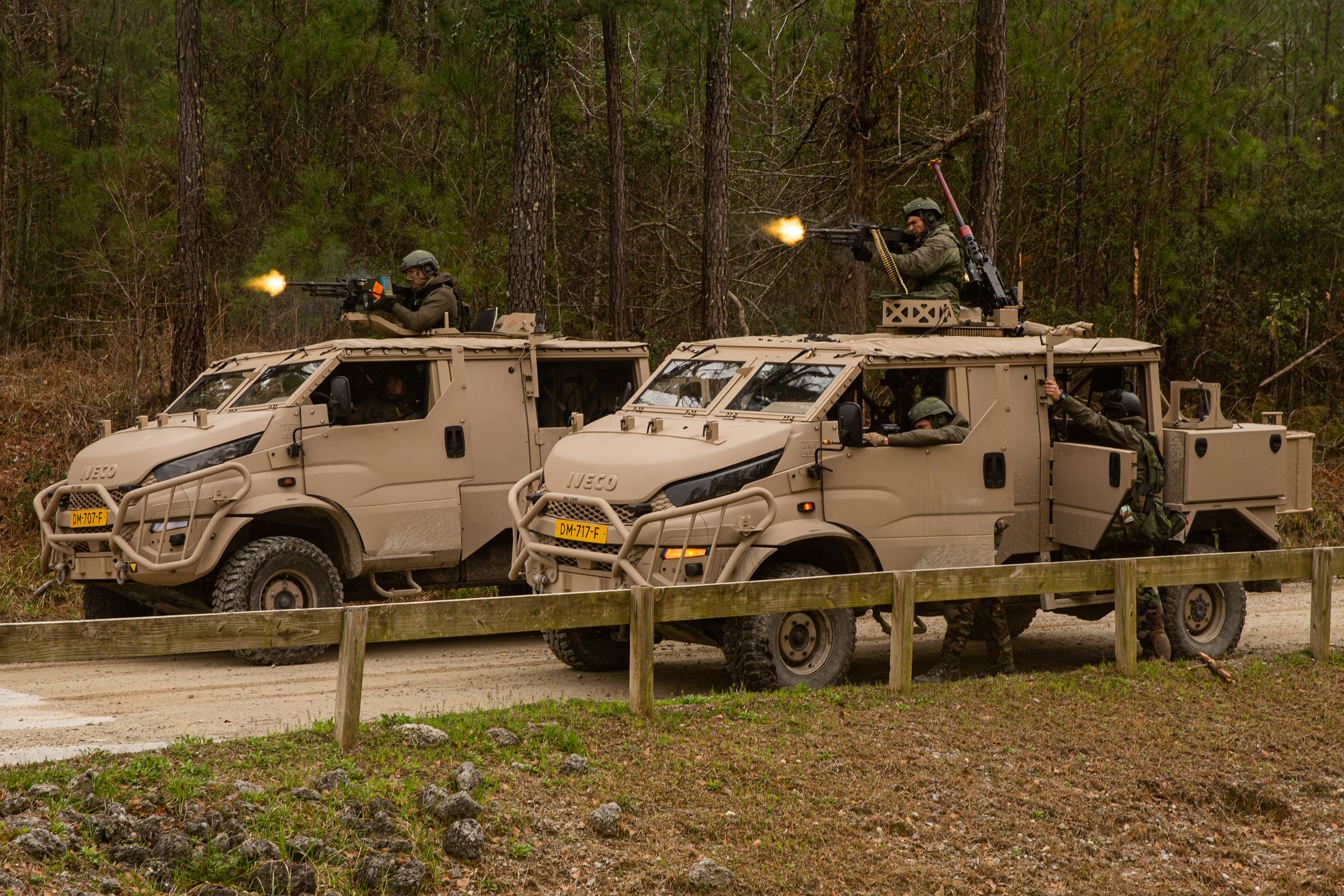
Two DMV Anaconda’s during a military exercise.

In 2018 the Dutch Ministry of Defence issued a European tender for the replacement of the Mercedes-Benz G280 CDI’s that were used by the Royal Netherlands Marine Corps in the Dutch Caribbean. The Mercedes-Benz G280 CDI’s had to be replaced because the vehicles were needed for a mission of the Royal Netherlands Army in Mali. The vehicles were also overqualified for the tasks that they needed to perform in the Dutch Caribbean. In the same year that the tender was issued, the Dutch company DEBA Bedrijfswagens (English: DEBA Trucks) was declared as winner and awarded a contract to deliver the vehicles.

The vehicles were built by Dutch Military Vehicles (DMV) and named DMV Anaconda. DMV emerged as company in 2018 from DEBA Bedrijfswagens. The first 36 Anaconda’s were planned to be delivered in January 2019. Eventually 35 were delivered in January with 11 to follow later.

14 Anaconda’s were ordered as replacement of the Land Rovers of the Royal Netherlands Marine Corps. They will serve as temporary solution until the 12kN Iveco vehicles will enter service.

== Design ==
The Anaconda has a length of 5.275 meters (m), width of 2.26m and a height of 2.30m. When it comes to weight the vehicle has a mass of 3900 kilograms (kg) and a load capacity of 2100 kg. There is space in the vehicle for a crew of four plus gunner.

=== Armament ===
The Anaconda can be equipped with two machine guns.

== Variants ==
=== Anaconda AAT ===
Anti armour troop (AAT) version of the Anaconda.

=== Anaconda SOF ===
This variant is specially designed for service in special operations forces (SOF).

== See also ==
- VECTOR
- Manticore
