= Organization of the Netherlands Marine Corps =

As of 2026 the Netherlands Marine Corps consists of the following units:

== Organization ==
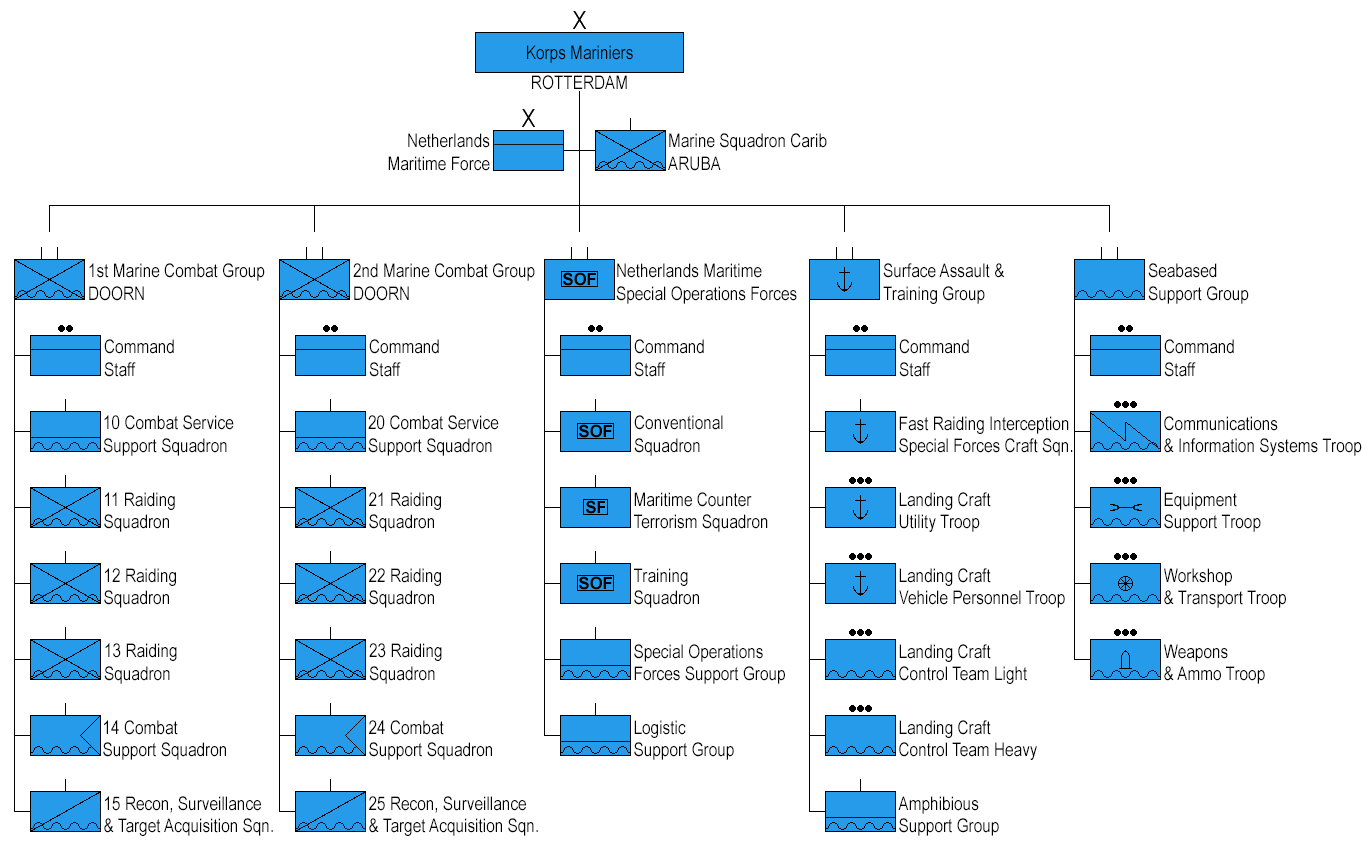
Netherlands Marine Corps organization as of May 2026

- Netherlands Marine Corps, in Rotterdam
  - Netherlands Maritime Force, in Rotterdam (Expeditionary operational headquarters)
  - Band of the Korps Mariniers (53 men)
  - 1st Marine Combat Group, in Doorn (726 men)
    - Command Staff (30 men)
    - 10 Combat Service Support Squadron (171 men)
      - Command staff
      - Communication and Information Systems Troop
      - Equipment Support Troop
      - Medical Support Troop
      - Transport Troop
      - Workshop Troop
    - 11 Raiding Squadron (108 men)
      - Command staff
      - 3× Raiding troops consisting of 2× raiding sections of 14 men each
    - 12 Raiding Squadron (108 men)
      - Command staff
      - 3× Raiding troops consisting of 2× raiding sections of 14 men each
    - 13 Raiding Squadron (108 men)
      - Command staff
      - 3× Raiding troops consisting of 2× raiding sections of 14 men each
    - 14 Combat Support Squadron (114 men)
      - Command staff
      - Assault Engineer Troop
        - 3× Sections, each of which supports one Raiding Squadron of the Marine Combat Group
      - Anti-Armour Troop (Spike anti-tank guided missiles)
        - 3× Sections, each of which supports one Raiding Squadron of the Marine Combat Group
      - Armoured All-Terrain Vehicle Troop (Bv 206S and BvS 10 armoured all-terrain personnel carriers)
        - 3× Sections, each of which supports one Raiding Squadron of the Marine Combat Group
    - 15 Recon, Surveillance & Target Acquisition Squadron (87 men)
      - Command staff (includes Joint Fires Cells)
      - Forward Observer Troop
        - 4× Fire Support Teams of six men each
      - Reconnaissance Sniper Troop
      - Mortar Troop (L16 81mm mortars)
      - Low Altitude Air Defence Section
      - Unmanned Aerial Vehicle System Section (RQ-11 Raven and RQ-20 Puma UAVs)
  - 2nd Marine Combat Group, in Doorn (726 men)
    - Command Staff (30 men)
    - 20 Combat Service Support Squadron (171 men)
      - Command staff
      - Communication and Information Systems Troop
      - Equipment Support Troop
      - Medical Support Troop
      - Transport Troop
      - Workshop Troop
    - 21 Raiding Squadron (108 men)
      - Command staff
      - 3× Raiding troops consisting of 2× raiding sections of 14 men each
    - 22 Raiding Squadron (108 men)
      - Command staff
      - 3× Raiding troops consisting of 2× raiding sections of 14 men each
    - 23 Raiding Squadron (108 men)
      - Command staff
      - 3× Raiding troops consisting of 2× raiding sections of 14 men each
    - 24 Combat Support Squadron (114 men)
      - Command staff
      - Assault Engineer Troop
        - 3× Sections, each of which supports one Raiding Squadron of the Marine Combat Group
      - Anti-Armour Troop (Spike anti-tank guided missiles)
        - 3× Sections, each of which supports one Raiding Squadron of the Marine Combat Group
      - Armoured All-Terrain Vehicle Troop (Bv 206S and BvS 10 armoured all-terrain personnel carriers)
        - 3× Sections, each of which supports one Raiding Squadron of the Marine Combat Group
    - 25 Recon, Surveillance & Target Acquisition Squadron (87 men)
      - Command staff (includes Joint Fires Cells)
      - Forward Observer Troop
        - 4× Fire Support Teams of six men each
      - Reconnaissance Sniper Troop
      - Mortar Troop (L16 81mm mortars)
      - Low Altitude Air Defence Section
      - Unmanned Aerial Vehicle System Section (RQ-11 Raven and RQ-20 Puma UAVs)
  - Netherlands Maritime Special Operations Forces, in Doorn and Den Helder
    - Command Staff
    - Conventional Squadron (C-Squadron)
      - 2× Frogman troops
      - 1× Mountain leader Troop
    - Maritime Counter Terrorism Squadron (M-Squadron)
      - 3× Maritime Counter Terrorism troops
    - Training Squadron (T-Squadron)
    - Special Operations Forces Support Group (SOFSG)
    - Logistic Support Group (LSG)
  - Surface Assault & Training Group, in Texel (241 men)
    - Command Staff
    - Fast Raiding Interception and Special Forces Craft (FRISC) Squadron
      - Raiding Crafts Troop (supports the Marine Combat Groups)
      - Maritime Counter Terrorism Crafts Troop (supports the Maritime Counter Terrorism Squadron)
      - Special Operation and Interceptor Crafts Troop (supports the Conventional Squadron)
    - Landing Craft Utility Troop (5× Landing Craft Utility)
    - Landing Craft Vehicle Personnel Troop (12× Landing Craft Vehicle Personnel)
    - Landing Craft Control Team Light
      - Command Staff
      - Beach Recce Group (includes a combat divers team)
      - Beach Control Group
      - Heavy Vehicle Group
    - Landing Craft Control Team Heavy
      - Command Staff
      - Beach Recce Group (includes a combat divers team)
      - Beach Control Group
      - Heavy Vehicle Group (Leopard 1 BARV armoured recovery vehicles)
    - Amphibious Support Group (provides logistical support)
  - Seabased Support Group (98 men)
    - Command Staff
    - Communications and Information Systems (CIS) Troop
    - Equipment Support Troop
    - Weapons and Ammo Troop
    - Workshop and Transport Troop
  - Marine Squadron Carib, in Aruba (153 men; designated "32 Raiding Squadron" until July 2022)
    - Command Staff
    - 1 Raiding Troop
    - 2 Raiding Troop
    - 3 Raiding Troop
    - Fast Raiding Interception and Special Forces Craft (FRISC) Troop
    - Combat Service Support Troop
