= Severe Clear =

- Film poster
- Directed by: Kristian Fraga
- Written by: Kristian Fraga
- Produced by: Benjamin Charbit; Kristian Fraga; Shari Hamrick; Marc Perez; John L. Sikes; Sehban Zaidi
- Starring: Mike Scotti
- Edited by: Kristian Fraga
- Music by: Cliff Martinez
- Production company: Sirk Productions
- Distributed by: G2 Pictures
- Release dates: March 16, 2009 (SXSW); March 12, 2010 (United States)
- Running time: 93 minutes
- Country: United States
- Language: English

Severe Clear is a 2009 documentary film directed by American documentary maker Kristian Fraga, starring and using footage shot by First Lieutenant Mike Scotti of United States Marine Corps Bravo Company, 1st Battalion 4th Marines. The film explores the Marine drive to Baghdad during the 2003 invasion of Iraq.

== Filming ==
A small clip depicting artillery fire in 2003

The footage was shot as Mike Scotti fought on the front lines of Operation Iraqi Freedom in 2003, he recorded what he saw on his personal mini-DV camera. The film was released at the South by Southwest Film Festival.

== See also ==
- Armadillo, a 2010 Danish documentary about Danish troops stationed at the "Armadillo" forward operating base in Helmand Province, Afghanistan
- Restrepo, a 2010 American documentary about troops in Afghanistan
