= Netherlands Marine Corps =

Royal Dutch Navy component

- Korps Mariniers (Dutch)
- Badge
- Founded: 10 December 1665
- Country: Netherlands
- Allegiance: Government of the Netherlands
- Branch: Royal Netherlands Navy
- Type: Marines
- Role: Expeditionary warfare Amphibious warfare Arctic warfare Mountain warfare Special operations
- Size: c. 2,500
- Garrison/HQ: Marine Combat Groups – Doorn; NLMARSOF – Doorn & Den Helder; 32nd Raiding Squadron – Aruba; Surface Assault and Training Group (SATG) – Texel
- Nickname: "The Black Devils"
- Mottos: Qua Patet Orbis (Latin) "As Far as the World Extends"
- Colours: Navy Blue, Red
- March: Defileermars der Koninklijke Marine
- Engagements: List of engagements: Second Anglo-Dutch War; Third Anglo-Dutch War; War of the Spanish Succession; Battle of Texel; Battle of Seneffe; Battle of Dogger Bank; Bombardment of Algiers; Rotterdam Blitz; Battle of the Java Sea; Battle of Java; Indonesian War of Independence; Korean War; Bosnian War; Iraq War; War in Afghanistan; Operation Atalanta; Mali War; Military intervention against ISIL
- Decorations: Military William Order
- Website: korpsmariniers.com

Commanders
- Commandant: BG Ivo Moerman, KM
- Notable commanders: Willem Joseph van Ghent

Insignia
- Collar emblem

The Netherlands Marine Corps (Dutch: Korps Mariniers) is the elite naval infantry corps of the Royal Netherlands Navy, one of the four Armed Forces of the Kingdom of the Netherlands. The marines trace their origins to the establishment of the Regiment de Marine on 10 December 1665, by the then grand pensionary of the Dutch Republic, Johan de Witt and famous Admiral Michiel de Ruyter. It is the second-oldest still-active marine corps in the world.

The present-day Corps is a rapid reaction force that can be deployed to any location in the world within a maximum of 48 hours. The marines are capable of operating in all environments and climates, specialising in expeditionary warfare, amphibious warfare, arctic warfare and mountain warfare. The core fighting element of the corps consists of two battalion-sized Marine Combat Groups (MCGs) which are supplemented by various combat support and combat service support squadrons. In addition, the Netherlands Maritime Special Operations Forces (NLMARSOF) are capable of conducting the full spectrum of special operations.

Throughout its history, the Marines have seen action in a number of major conflicts including the Anglo-Dutch Wars, the War of the Spanish Succession and World War II. In recent history the Marines have regularly been deployed in stabilisation roles such as the Bosnian War, the Iraq War, the War in Afghanistan and the Mali War. Additionally, the Corps conducts counterpiracy operations in the Gulf of Aden and provides Vessel Protection Detachments (VPDs) to Dutch merchant ships. The Netherlands Marine Corps uphold close international relations with the Royal Marines, the United States Marine Corps, the Sea Battalion (German: Seebataillon) and the Special Operations Regiment.

== History ==
=== Origins ===
The corps was founded on 10 December 1665 during the Second Anglo-Dutch War by the then grand pensionary of the Dutch Republic, Johan de Witt, and Admiral Michiel de Ruyter as the Regiment de Marine. The first commander of the corps was Willem Joseph van Ghent. The Dutch had successfully used conventional troops embarked on ships during the First Anglo-Dutch War. The Korps Mariniers was the fifth European marine branch formed, being preceded by the Spanish Marine Infantry (1537), Portuguese Marine Corps (1610), France's troupes de marine (1622) and the Royal Marines (1664), although the Dutch marines were the first to specialise in amphibious operations.

The Netherlands has had several periods during which its Marine Corps were disbanded. The French occupation of The Netherlands, which lasted from 1810 until 1813, is an example of such disbandments. A new Marine unit was raised on 20 March 1801 during the time of the Batavian Republic and on 14 August 1806 the Korps Koninklijke Grenadiers van de Marine was raised under King Louis Bonaparte. The modern Korps Mariniers dates back to 1814, receiving its current name in 1817.

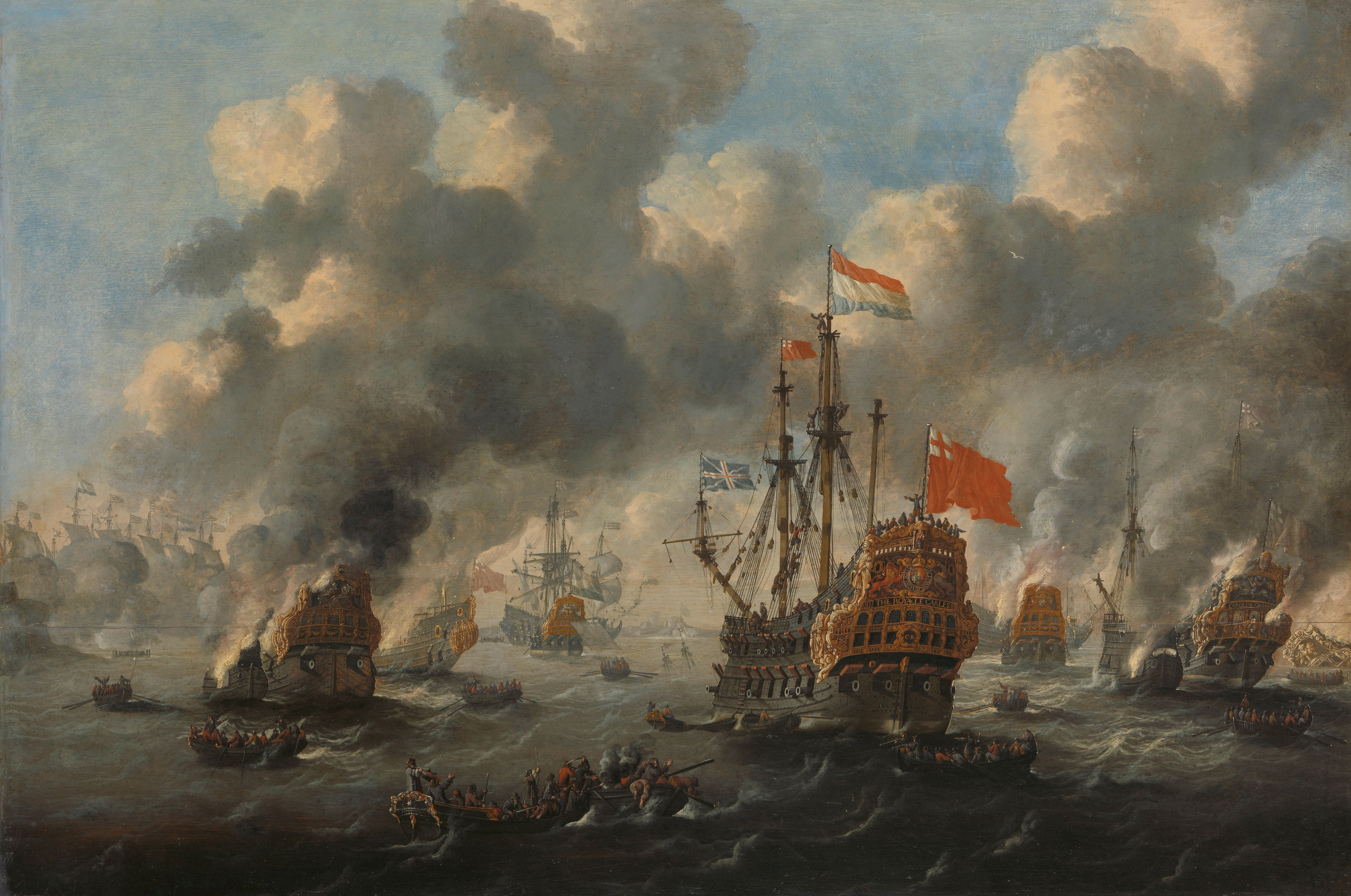
The raid on the Medway, the first action of the Dutch marines in 1667.

In 1667, led by Admiral van Ghent, and their new commander, the Englishman Colonel Thomas Dolman, the Regiment de Marine played a prominent part in the Dutch raid on the Medway in Kent (10–14 June). The Korps' battle honour "Chatham" is one of the few ever won on British soil by a foreign unit. The July 2nd attack on Landguard fort near Harwich, performed by 1,500 Mariniers after landing at Woodrich was defeated by the English.

The mariniers also fought in the Franco-Dutch War and Third Anglo-Dutch War. On 29 June 1672, after serving in the Battle of Solebay, two-thirds of the Marines were withdrawn from the Dutch States Navy and formed into a brigade in order to reinforce the Dutch States Army, which consisted largely of mercenaries, in anticipation of a potential English invasion. They returned to their ships in time to help prevent any such invasion by defeating an Anglo-French fleet at the Battle of Texel on 21 August 1673. Led by Gerolf van Isselmuyden, they served in the land battle of Seneffe against the French in 1674.

Dutch support for American independence led to the Fourth Anglo-Dutch War, where the mariniers served at Dogger Bank.

In 1704, Marines were part of a combined English-Dutch force under Prince George of Hesse-Darmstadt that captured Gibraltar and defended it successfully shortly afterwards. The cooperation with the British was repeated once again during the Bombardment of Algiers in 1816.

The Korps Mariniers served in various colonial operations of the Dutch Empire in the Dutch East Indies. The gradual conquest of the colony and operations consolidating Dutch rule lasted from the 1850s until shortly before World War I. The battle honours from the Aceh War (1873–1913) and Bali are displayed on the Corps' colour.

=== World War II ===
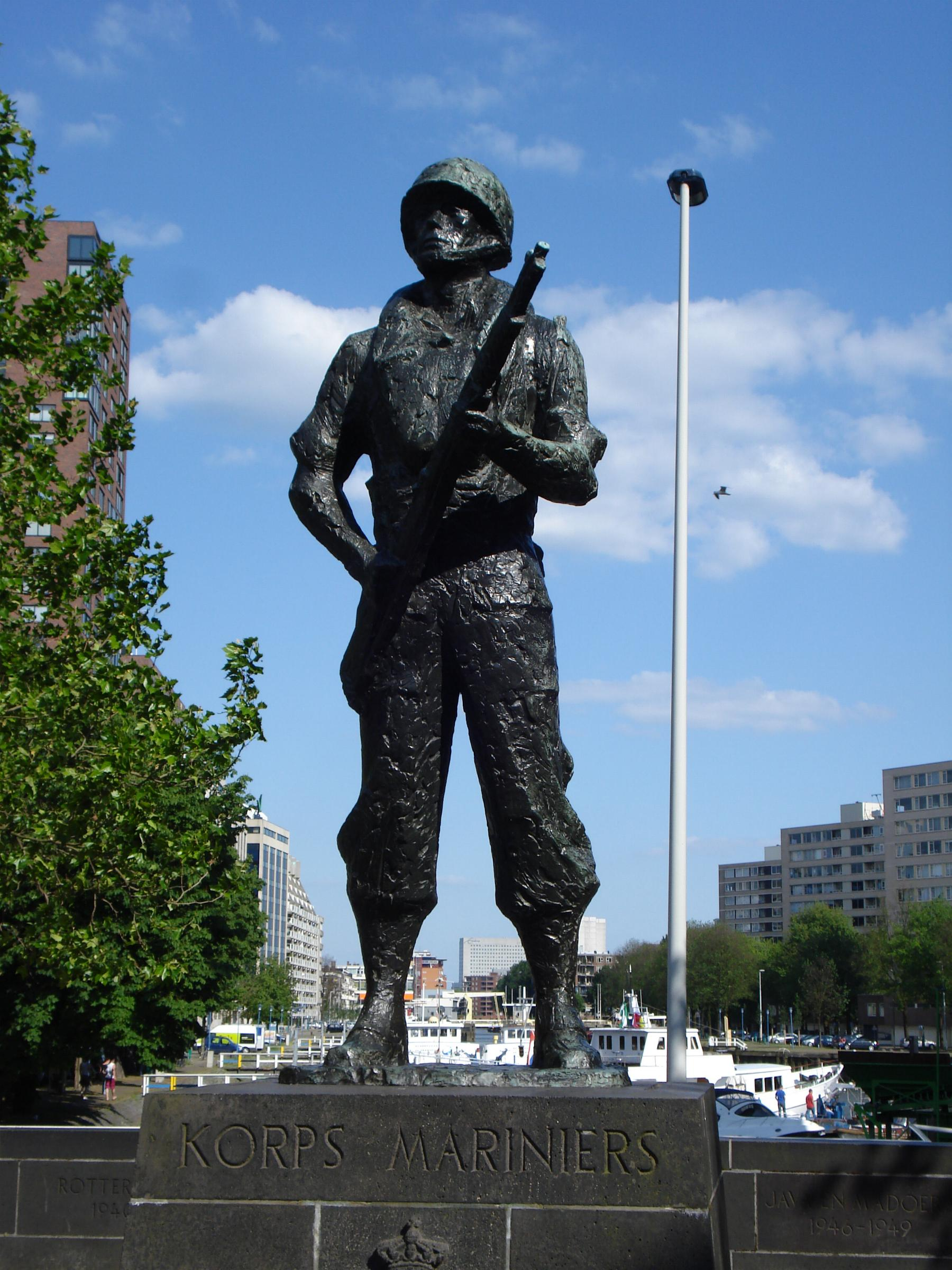
Marine Corps monument in Rotterdam.

During the Battle of the Netherlands in World War II, a Korps Mariniers unit in Rotterdam which was preparing to ship out to the Dutch East Indies successfully defended the bridges across the Maas, preventing German paratroopers in the centre of the city from rendez-vousing with conventional German infantry. The Germans ended the stalemate by bombing Rotterdam. The threat of an attack by Marines caused its German captain to scuttle the Antilla in Aruba in 1940.

When the Dutch capitulation was declared and the Marines abandoned their positions, the German commander was surprised to encounter only a handful of troops emerge in their black uniforms. The Oberleutnant ordered his men to salute them out of respect for their bravery and labeled them die schwarzen Teufel ("The Black Devils").

During the German occupation of the Netherlands, some mariniers joined the Princess Irene Brigade to fight against the Germans. They distinguished themselves in combat near the Dutch city of Tilburg in the autumn of 1944.

Starting in 1943, the United States Marine Corps trained and equipped a new brigade, the Mariniersbrigade, of the Korps Mariniers at Camp Lejeune and Camp Davis in North Carolina in preparation for amphibious landings against the Japanese in the Dutch East Indies. The Japanese surrendered before such landings were needed, but the Mariniersbrigade, fully trained and equipped, left North Carolina in six transports in 1945 and fought against Indonesian insurgents in the Indonesian War of Independence. The mariniers were part of the A Division, which was itself commanded by a Korps Mariniers officer. The brigade was disbanded in 1949.

The Dutch maintained control over Western New Guinea after the Indonesian War of Independence and the Korps Mariniers served there until 1962 when the colony in the course of the West New Guinea dispute was handed over to the United Nations Temporary Executive Authority.

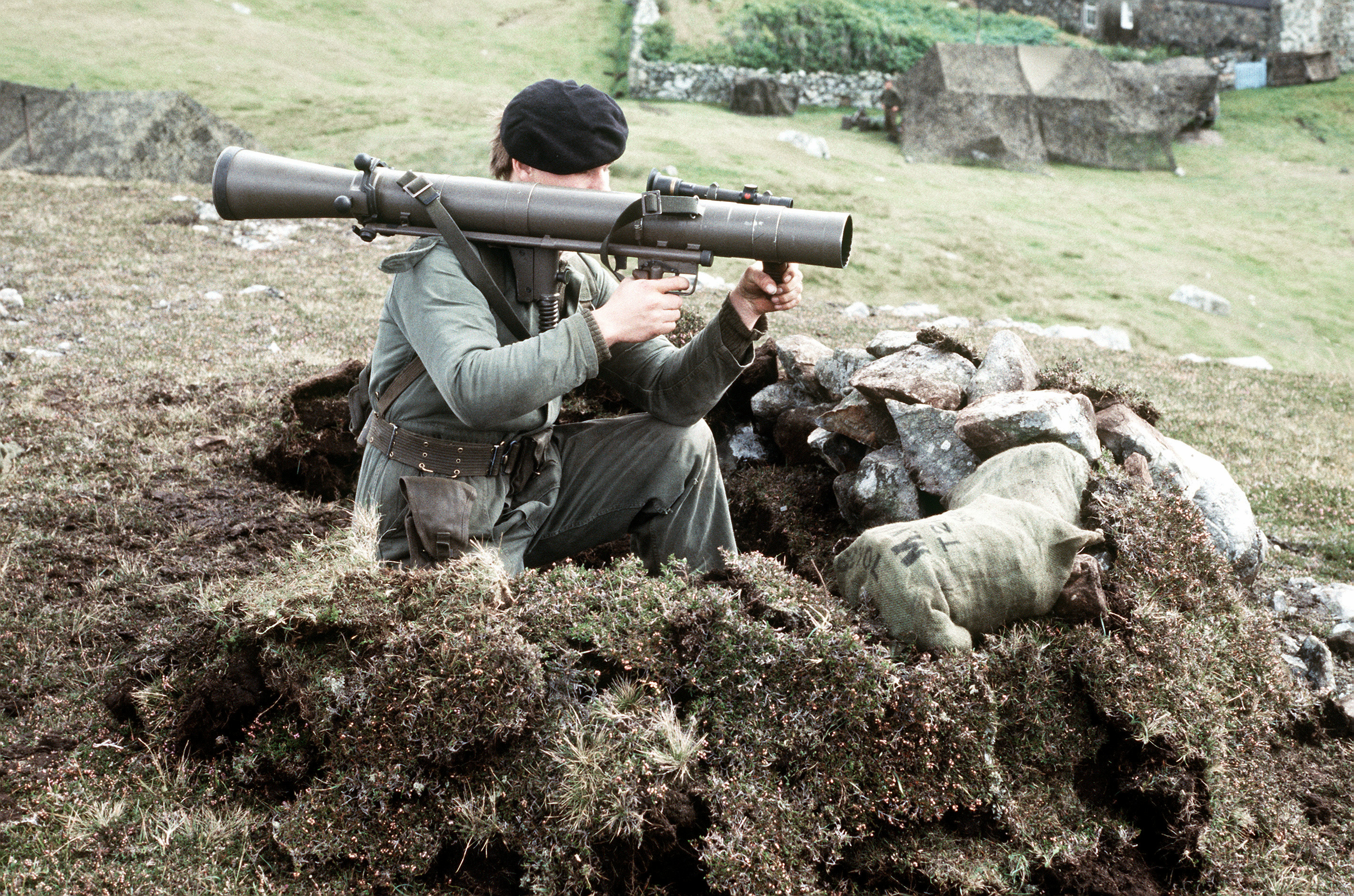
Marine conscript aiming down the sights of Carl Gustaf anti-tank weapon during NATO exercise Northern Wedding in 1978.

=== Recent history ===
==== Terrorism during the 1970s ====
On 11 June 1977, the Bijzondere Bijstandseenheid Mariniers (BBE-M, Special Support Unit Marines) of the Dutch Marine Corps stormed a train that was being held hostage since 23 May by armed South Moluccan nationalists in the village of De Punt, in the province of Drenthe. Six Royal Netherlands Air Force F-104 Starfighters buzzed the train as a diversion just before the assault. Six terrorists and two hostages were killed during the assault.

==== Cambodia ====
From 18 February 1992 to 18 November 1993, three battalions of Marines and a Navy field hospital (FDS) were stationed in Cambodia as part of the United Nations Transitional Authority in Cambodia (UNTAC). The marines were deployed following the 1991 Paris peace treaty when the civil war was ended, they were tasked with providing safe passage to refugees, disarming rebel groups and organising fair elections.

==== Former Yugoslavia ====
Marines have deployed to Former Yugoslavia during multiple deployments, including in Bosnia, Kosovo and Macedonia. Marines of 1st Mortars Company were deployed near Sarajevo in 1995 with their MO-120 RT 120mm mortars in order to neutralise Serbian mortar and artillery positions. The Marines were part of multinational brigade. For example, Marine Special Forces were tasked with the arrest of Yugoslavian war criminals, other Marine units have deployed to accompany and protect refugee convoys in Kosovo.

==== Iraq ====
In 1991, 400 marines in addition 600 personnel of the Royal Netherlands Army were deployed to the Kurdistan Region of Iraq as part Operation Provide Comfort. The detachment of Marines consisted of a staff company, a support company and two infantry companies. The units constructed three refugee camps which were later transferred to civilian organisations. The last marines returned in July 1991.

In 2003 and 2004, two battalions of Marines were deployed to Iraq as part of the Stabilisation Force Iraq (SFIR). They were stationed in the province of Al-Muthanna where they operated under British command. Their main base was located at Camp Smitty in As Samawah. One company of marines was located at the village of Ar Rumaythah and one at the village of Al Khidr.

Since 2015, Marines have contributed to Operation Inherent Resolve by providing training to the Peshmerga and the Iraqi Special Operations Forces as part of the International military intervention against ISIL. A&A teams cooperated with the Korps Commandotroepen by providing advice and assistance to Iraqi troops in the fight against ISIL.

==== Liberia ====
From 18 November 2003 until 19 February 2004, one platoon of Dutch Marines was deployed on board HNLMS Rotterdam, a Landing platform dock (LPD) of the Royal Netherlands Navy to provide logistical support for United Nations Mission in Liberia (UNMIL).

==== Congo ====
Between 2005 and 2006, Major General of the Marines Patrick Cammaert was appointed division commander of the United Nations Organization Mission in the Democratic Republic of the Congo (MONUC) by UN secretary general Kofi Annan.

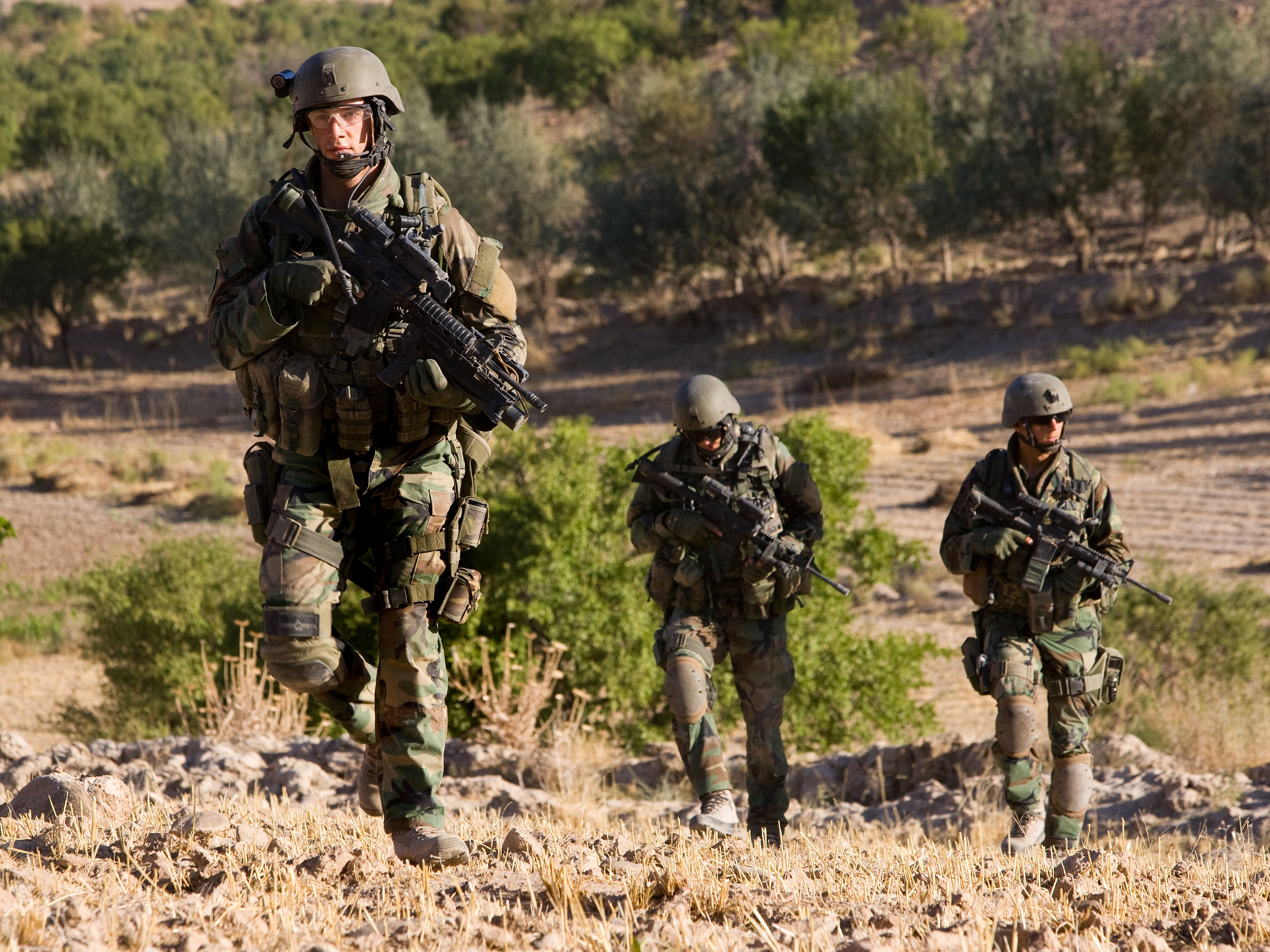
Marines on patrol during the multi-day Operation Ghat Mahay in the vicinity of Kakarak, Uruzgan in 2009.

==== Afghanistan ====
From 11 January 2002 to July 2010, marines were deployed in Afghanistan as part of the International Security Assistance Force (ISAF). The second battalion and the field hospital were deployed in Mazar-e Sharif in 2005 to provide security during the elections. Marines and Navy personnel were also stationed in the Provincial Reconstruction Team in pol-e-Khomri, province of Baghlan. They took over from the Dutch Air force and Army in 2005 and were relieved in October 2006 when Hungarian forces took over. Formerly Marines have served in Uruzgan as the NLD Operational Mentor and Liaisons Team, for recruiting and training new military personnel of the Afghan National Army in the Uruzgan province. Training took place at Kamp Holland, Tarin Kowt. A reinforced company was deployed in the Deh Rashan area of Uruzgan province. Two marines were killed on April 17 of 2010 when their Bv S10 Viking was hit by an IED. Teams of NLMARSOF cooperated with operators of the Korps Commandotroepen (KCT) in the Special Operations Task Groups Orange, Task Force Viper and Task Force 55 from 2006 until 2010.

C-Squadron of NLMARSOF has deployed to Afghanistan since 2018 as part of the Resolute Support Mission. Together with KCT operators they form the Special Operations Advisory Team (SOAT), which is tasked with providing training and assistance to the Afghan police tactical unit Afghan Territorial Force 888 (ATF-888) of the Afghan National Police.

==== Counterpiracy ====
Since 2008 marines have been deployed as boarding teams aboard naval ships of the Royal Netherlands Navy, tasked with conducting counterpiracy operations off the coast of East Africa. The Dutch marines received international attention following the Action of 5 April 2010, during which the container ship MV Taipan was liberated from Somali pirates by an NLMARSOF boarding team. The operation was filmed using a helmet-mounted camera and made public by the Ministry of Defence, consequently displayed by news media across the globe. Moreover, NLMARSOF frogmen have conducted extremely rare operational underwater operations, including the sabotage of pirate ships. Since 2011 the Corps has provided Vessel Protection Detachments (VPDs) to Dutch merchant vessels sailing through areas prone to piracy.

== Organisation ==
=== Structure ===
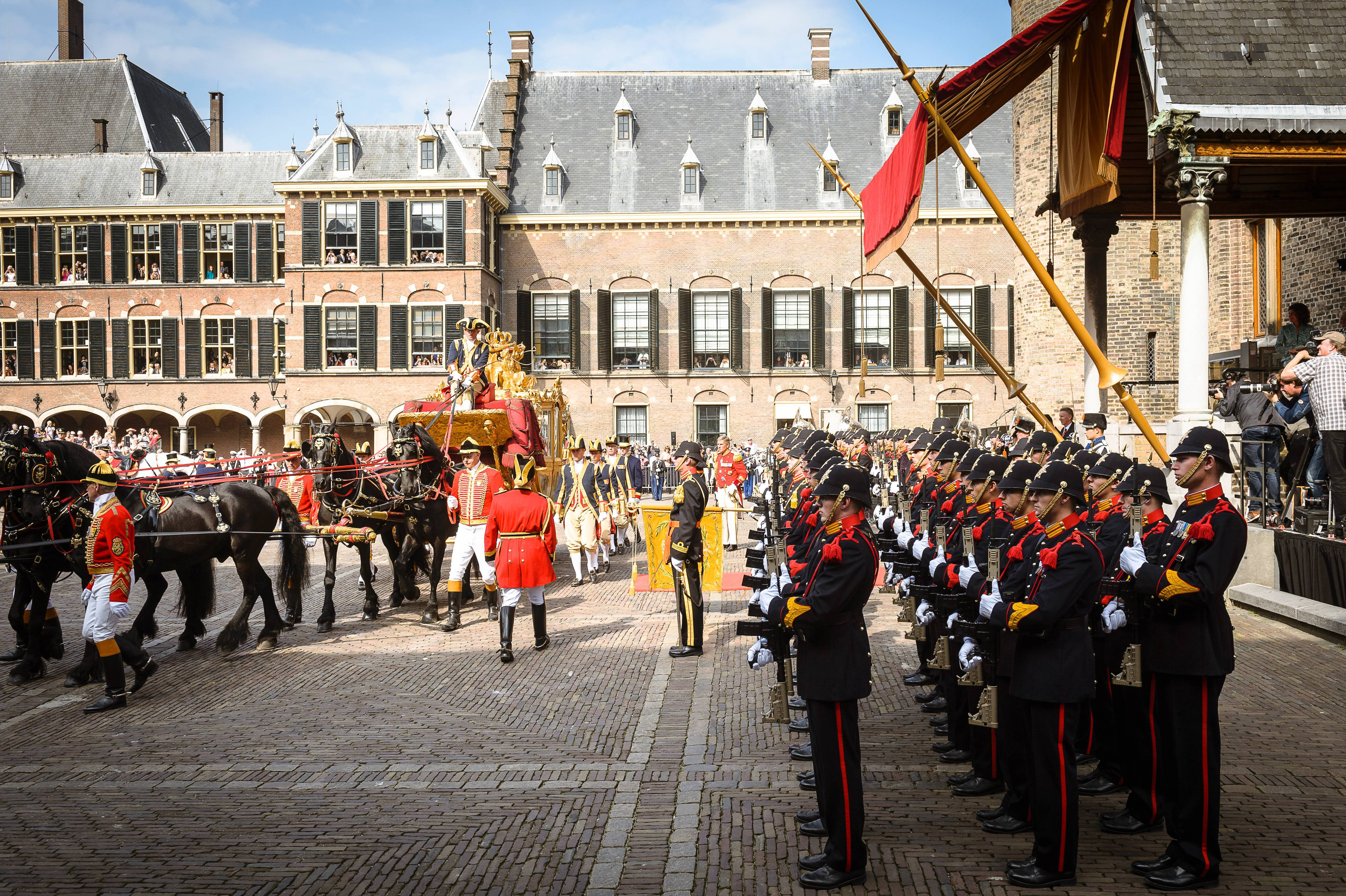
Marines in formation, presenting the colours to King Willem-Alexander.

The Corps is headed by the Korpscommandant, an officer in the rank of Brigadier General. All operational units fall under the command of the Groepscommandant Operationele Eenheden Mariniers (GC-OEM, Group Commander Operational Units Marines). The brigade-level command element Netherlands Maritime Force (NLMARFOR) is the expeditionary operational staff headquarters which is commanded by a Colonel. The core fighting element of the corps consists of two battalion-sized Marine Combat Groups (MCGs), 1st Marine Combat Group is the main contribution of the Netherlands Marine Corps to the United Kingdom/Netherlands Landing Force (UK/NL LF).

Following the large scale reorganisation of the Armed Forces in 2013, the Corps was affected as well. The Corps was restructured, among other changes. The battalion composition and naming was changed:

- A rifle group of 8 men became a Raiding Section of 16 men
- A platoon of 30 men became a Raiding Troop of 32 men
- A company became a Raiding Squadron consisting of 3 Raiding Troops
- A battalion became a Marine Combat Group consisting of 3 Raiding Squadrons, 1 Combat Support Squadron, 1 Combat Service Support Squadron and 1 Recce, Surveillance & Target Acquisition Squadron
- Battalion units were required to complete additional training to become certified as special operations capable (SOC)

=== Units ===
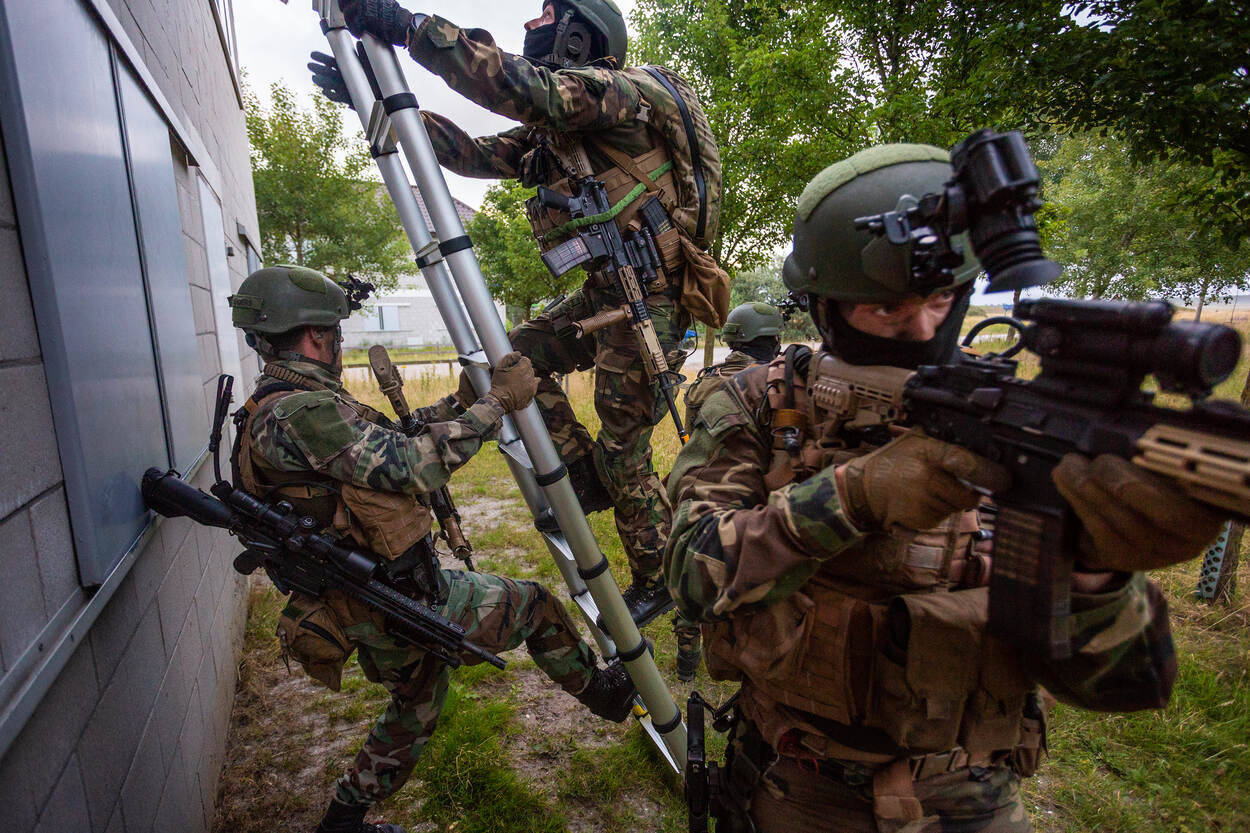
Marines during a Certification Exercise in a training village, in 2018.

==== Marine Combat Groups ====
The Corps consists of two battalion-sized Marine Combat Groups (MCGs), 1st MCG and 2nd MCG, which are headed by a Lieutenant Colonel and each field approximately 726 men divided into 6 squadrons: 3 Raiding Squadrons (R Sqn),1 Combat Service Support Squadron (CSS Sqn),1 Combat Support Squadron (CS Sqn), and 1 Reconnaissance, Surveillance & Target Acquisition Squadron (RSTA Sqn).with a command staff consisting of 30 men each.

The three Raiding Squadrons of each MCG are commanded by Majors and consist of 108 men each. The Raiding Squadrons each field 3 Raiding Troops with two Raiding Sections of 14 men each per troop.

The Recce, Surveillance & Target Acquisition (RSTA) Squadrons are commanded by a Major and consist of 87 men. Each RSTA Squadron fields a forward Observer Troop with four Fire Support Teams of six men each, an Unmanned Aerial Vehicle System section with AeroVironment RQ-11 Raven and AeroVironment RQ-20 Puma UAVs, a Reconnaissance Sniper Troop, a Mortar Troop with L16 81mm mortars and a Low Altitude Air Defense section. In addition, the RSTA Squadron staff provides Joint Fires Cells for its Marine Combat Group in order to coordinate all types of fire support.

The Combat Support Squadrons consist of 114 men and field a staff, an Assault Engineer Troop, an Anti-Armour Troop, and an Armoured All-Terrain Vehicle Troop. Each of these three troops fields three identical sections, with each section supporting one Raiding Squadron of the Marine Combat Group. The Assault Engineer Troop also provides Improvised Explosive Device detection capabilities. The Anti-Armour Troop provides direct fire support with Spike anti-tank guided missiles. The Armoured All-Terrain Vehicle Troop provides Bv 206S and BvS 10 armoured all-terrain personnel carriers to transport the three Raiding Squadrons.

The Combat Service Support Squadron fields 171 personnel and provide maintenance, medical, and logistic support. Each Combat Service Support Squadron consists of 5 specialist units: Workshop Troop, Transport Troop, Equipment Support Troop, Medical Support Troop, and Communication and Information Systems Troop.

In 2014, 13e Raiding Squadron was the first unit to complete additional training to become certified maritime special operations capable (MARSOC). A MARSOC unit can support and conduct special operations with NLMARSOF.

==== Netherlands Maritime Special Operations Forces ====
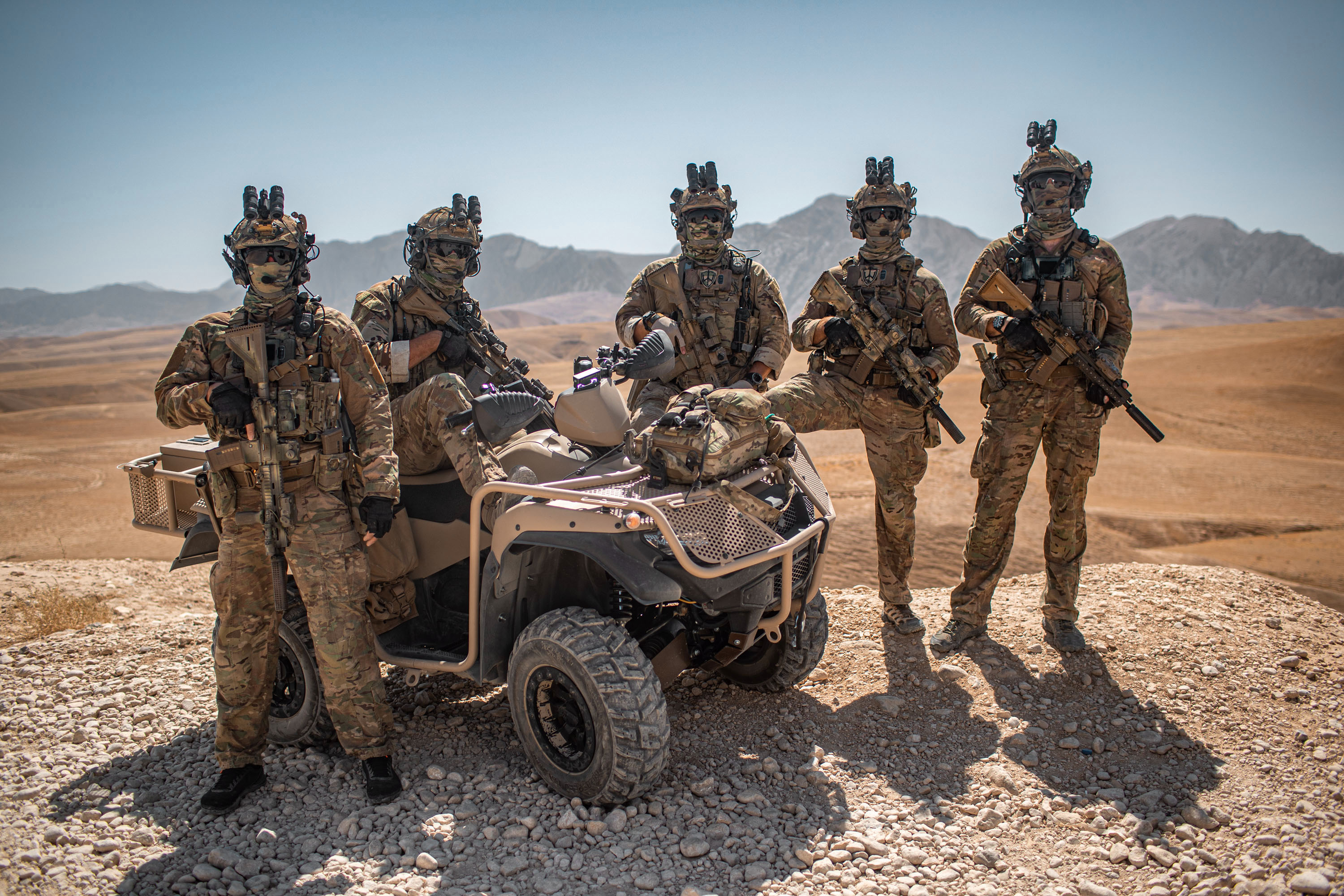
NLMARSOF operators of the Special Operations Advisory Team (SOAT) in Northern Afghanistan in 2019.

The Netherlands Maritime Special Operations Forces (NLMARSOF) is the SOF element of the Corps. NLMARSOF consists of two operational squadrons, a training squadron, a logistic element and a support group. The Maritime Counter Terrorism Squadron (M-Squadron) consists of three troops and is tasked with combating large-scale and complex domestic terrorist threats. It operates as an integral element of the Dienst Speciale Interventies (DSI) of the National Police. The Conventional Squadron (C-Squadron) is tasked with conducting the full spectrum of special operations abroad. C-Squadron fields three troops; two frogman troops specialised in underwater operations and one mountain leader troop specialised in mountain warfare. C-Squadron can be deployed by submarine, parachute, various underwater transport and snowmobiles. The Training Squadron (T-Squadron) trains all aspiring MARSOF operators in addition to providing operational training. The Special Operations Forces Support Group (SOFSG) provides operational support while the Logistic Support Group (LSG) is responsible for the maintenance, acquisition and storage of all equipment.

NLMARSOF was founded in 2013 by merging the Mountain Leader Reconnaissance Platoon, the Unit Interventie Mariniers and the Special Forces Underwater Operator Platoon. The maritime SOF training takes about 40 weeks, and eligible marines are trained to become long-range reconnaissance SOF operators and counter-terrorism specialists, with an emphasis on maritime special operations. Those who wish to specialise as mountain leader or frogman can apply for these specialisations following the completion of training. NLMARSOF is modelled after the British Special Boat Squadron.

==== Surface Assault and Training Group ====
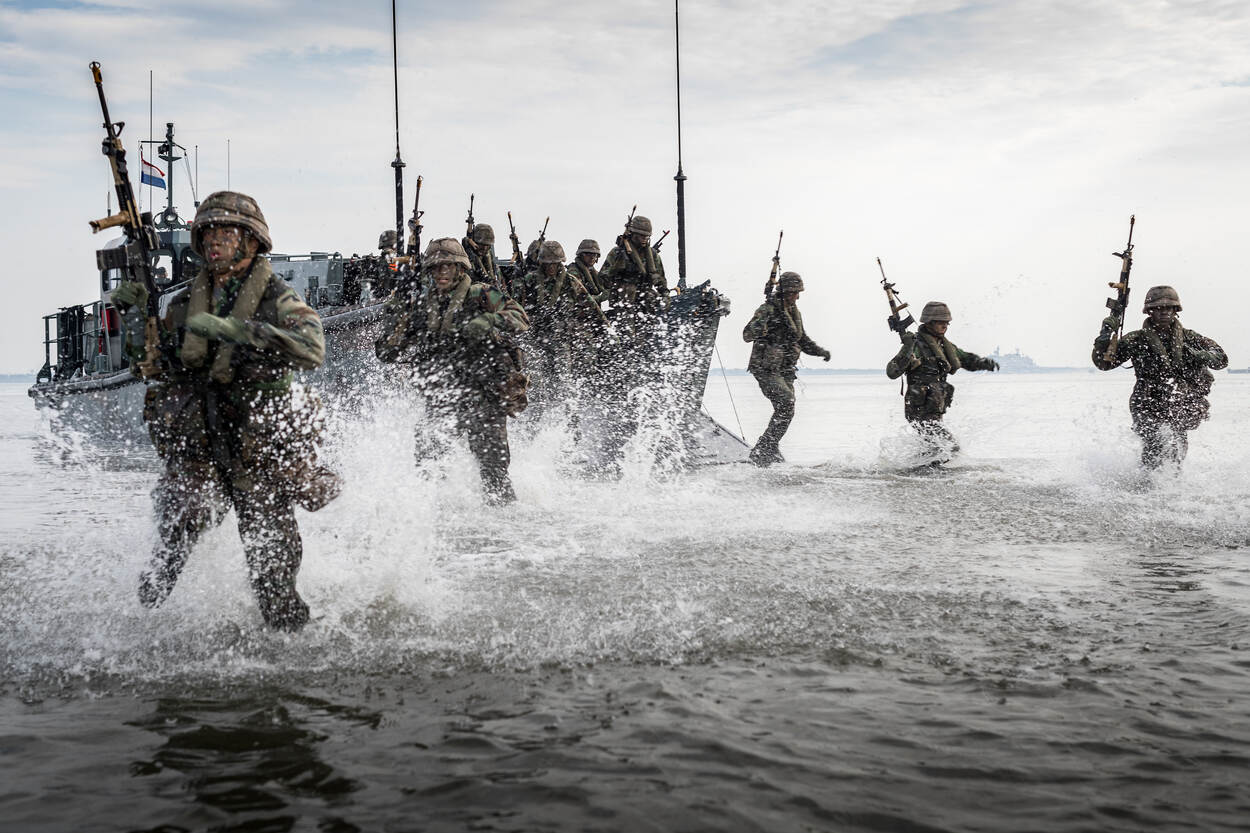
Royal Netherlands Navy LCVP during amphibious training on Texel.

The Surface Assault and Training Group (SATG) provides the Marine Corps with maritime vessels. The Surface Assault and Training Group consists of 241 men; besides the staff it fields an Amphibious Support Group, a Landing Craft Utility (LCU) Troop, a Landing Craft Vehicle Personnel (LCVP) Troop, a Fast Raiding Interception and Special Forces Craft (FRISC) Squadron, a Landing Craft Control Team Light and a Landing Craft Control Team Heavy. The Amphibious Support Group provides logistical support for the SATG. The LCU Troop fields five Landing Craft Utility with their crews, while the LCVP Troop fields 12 LCVPs with their crews.

The FRISC Squadron fields three troops: a troop with Raiding Crafts for the Marine Combat Groups, a troop with Maritime Counter Terrorism Crafts (MCT) for the Maritime Counter Terrorism Squadron, and a troop with Special Operation and Interceptor Crafts for the Conventional Squadron of the Maritime Special Operations Forces. The two Landing Craft Control Teams consist of a staff, a Beach Recce Group, a Beach Control Group and a Heavy Vehicle Group. The Landing Craft Control Team Heavy is equipped with Leopard 1 BARV beach armoured recovery vehicles. Both Beach Recce Groups field a team of divers to clear mines, barriers and other obstacles from landing beaches.

==== Seabased Support Group ====
The Seabased Support Group (SSG) fields 98 men and coordinates maritime operational logistic support for Marine units embarked on one the Rotterdam-class amphibious transport docks. The Seabased Support Group fields an Equipment Support Troop, a Weapons and Ammo Troop, a Workshop and Transport Troop and a Communications and Information Systems (CIS) Troop.

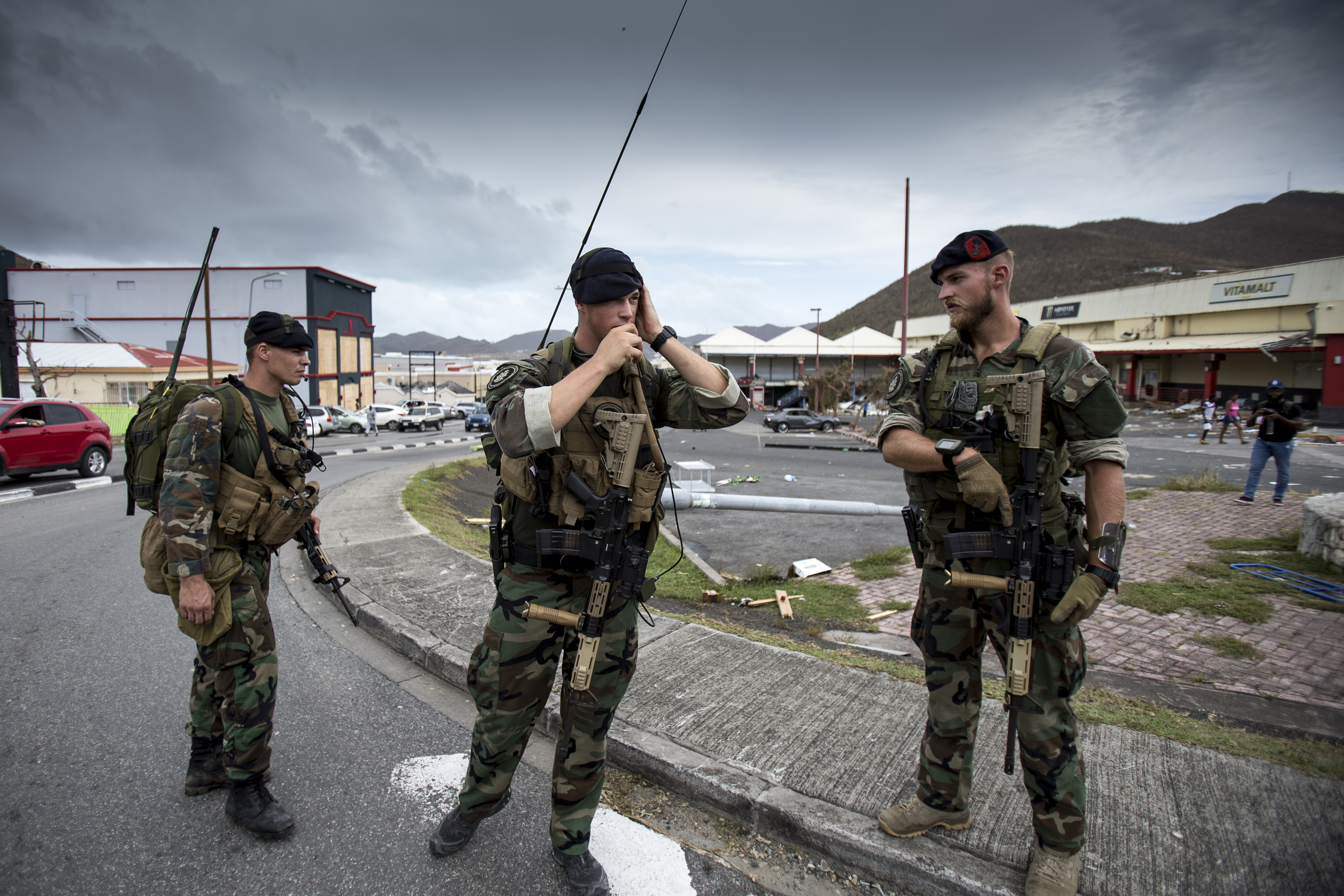
Marines deployed on Sint Maarten after Hurricane Irma in 2017. Marines provided medical assistance and maintained order on the island.

==== Marine Squadron Carib ====
The Marine Squadron Carib (designated "32nd Raiding Squadron" until July 2022) consists of 153 personnel and is stationed in Aruba and is responsible for the defence of the Netherlands Antilles. The Marine Squadron Carib falls operationally under the command of the Naval Commander of the Caribbean (CZMCARIB). The Marine Squadron Carib is stationed at the Korps Mariniers Barracks Savaneta (Aruba). Marines on Aruba also participate in anti-drug operations. The squadron is commanded by a Major and consists of a Headquarters, 3 Raiding troops, and the following supporting units a Fast Raiding, Interception and Special Forces Craft (FRISC) troop (with 12 boats), and a combat service support troop for transport, logistics, maintenance and medical care.

==== Marine Training Command ====
The Marine Training Command (MTC) is tasked with the validation, qualification and training of all operational units of the Corps. Furthermore, the command is responsible for maintaining adequate readiness and quality through the implementation of stringent training standards. Its training programs are adapted to the programs of its fleet equivalent, the Sea Training Command (STC), in order to maximise efficiency and interoperability of the marines and the fleet. The command is headed by a Colonel.

==== Marine Education Centre ====
The Marine Education Centre (Mariniersopleidingscentrum, MOC) is tasked with the selection, training and education of new marine recruits. The MOC provides all marine basic training and is based at the Van Ghent Barracks in Rotterdam, headed by a Lieutenant Colonel.

=== Locations ===
The majority of the operational units are based at the Van Braam Houckgeestkazerne in Doorn, in the province of Utrecht. These barracks are the headquarters of the Marine Combat Groups, Sea-based Support Group, and the staff and M-Squadron of NLMARSOF. Due to obsolescence of the location a new base is being constructed at Kamp Nieuw Milligen near the city of Apeldoorn. The Van Ghentkazerne is based in the city of Rotterdam and provides the basic training and many other training courses within the Corps. The Joost Dourleinkazerne is based on the island of Texel and functions as a forward operating base for the Surface Assault and Training Group from which all sorts of amphibious training can be employed. Moreover, the Corps has multiple bases and auxiliary branches in the Dutch Caribbean. Below follows an overview of the Corps' bases:

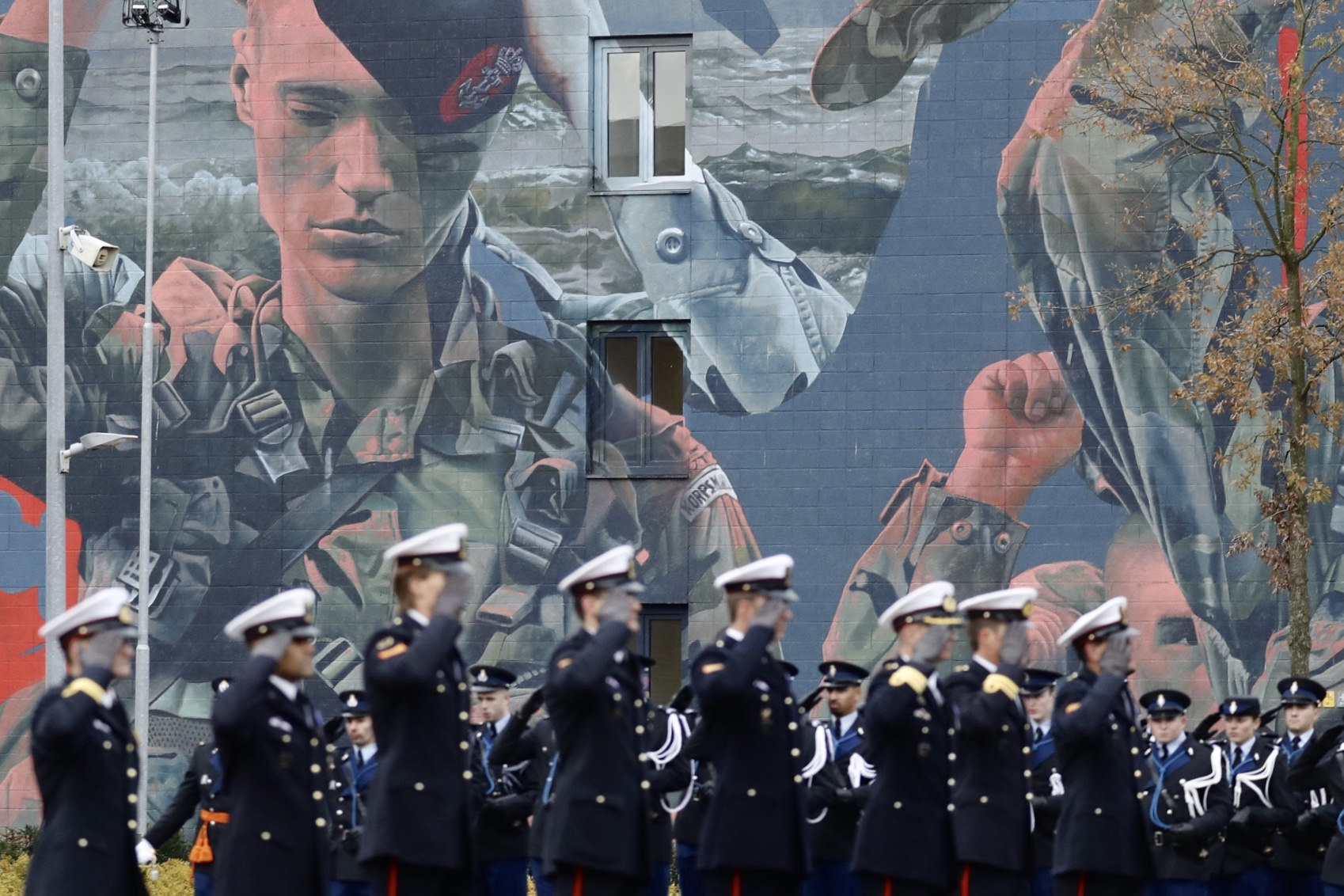
Mural on the walls of the Van Ghentkazerne in Rotterdam.

- Van Braam Houckgeestkazerne—Doorn, Utrecht
- Van Ghentkazerne—Rotterdam, South Holland
- Joost Dourleinkazerne—Texel, North Holland
- Marinebasis Parera—Willemstad, Curaçao
- Marinierskazerne Savaneta—Savaneta, Aruba
- Marinekazerne Suffisant—Curaçao
- Marinesteunpunt Pointe Blanche—Sint Maarten

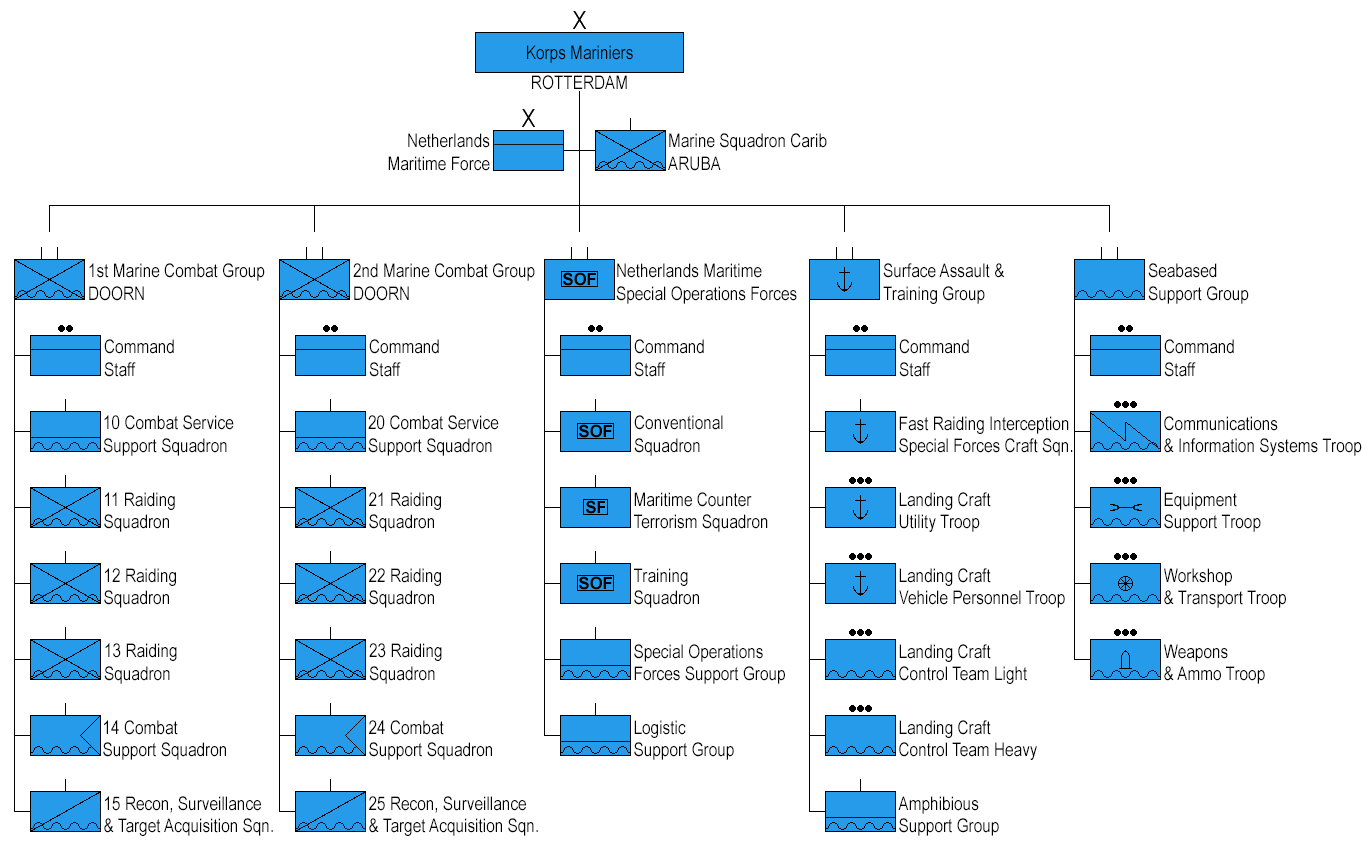
Netherlands Marine Corps Organization in 2026

== Recruitment and training ==
The mariniers are known for their arduous training programmes, which are primarily focused around hardship. Due to its longstanding and close cooperation with its British counterpart, the Royal Marines, training programmes are highly similar for both organisations. Although women have been allowed to join the Korps Mariniers since the beginning of 2017, no woman has successfully completed basic training yet.

Depending on the educational background, there are two career possibilities to become a Dutch marine: enlisted marine and marine officer. An overview of marine training courses:

- EVO (elementaire vakopleiding: Initial training to become an enlisted marine in the Netherlands lasts about 33 weeks (8 months—roughly equivalent to that of the British Royal Marines). It is given at the Mariniers Opleidingscentrum (M.O.C.) at the Van Ghentkazerne in Rotterdam. It is rigorous and very demanding, both physically and mentally, and eventually 30% to 50% will pass. If successfully completed, the recruits receive their "dark blue beret", and will be assigned to the operational units of Mariniers Training Command (MTC).
- VVO (voortgezette vakopleiding): Training to become a marine corporal lasts around 20 weeks. After 4–5 years of experience, marines who exhibit remarkable qualities can apply for this course, where they are being tested on leadership qualities and various military skills. Prior to the actual course, these marines will receive course segments, like marksman instructor, at an earlier stage. Only through experience can a marine corporal grow into sergeant.
- POTOM (praktische opleiding tot Officier der Mariniers—officer training): Initial training to become a marine officer in the Netherlands lasts a total of 22 months, starting with an intensive 11 months of practical marine officer's training and followed by 11 months of theoretical background and practical courses. The training is regarded as one of the most demanding initial military training programmes globally, with usually more than 70% of prospective officers dropping out. This part of the initial training programme is modular, which means that it is made up of 4 phases. First, the prospective officers will learn the basic skills of every enlisted marine, which takes about 10 weeks. After phase one comes the second phase, commanding a raiding section of 14 marines. This module lasts for 8 weeks, and emphasizes nightly operations. After successfully completing the second phase the third phase commences, which is focused on commanding a raiding troop of 32 marines. The fourth phase centers around commanding a raiding troop in different domains (e.g. urban, maritime setting). The last two modules are the longest, and cross-training is provided by both the Korps Mariniers and the British Royal Marines officer training teams. When successfully completing the 'POTOM', candidates are required to complete another year of general officer's training at the Koninklijk Instituut voor de Marine (Royal Dutch Naval Academy). Once this has been finished, the marine officer will be assigned to one of the operational units within the Marine Training Command (MTC).

=== Operational training ===
During operational training, there is more emphasis on various other tactics in amphibious warfare, and it will take about a year to become MARSOC (Maritime Special Operations Capable) certified, which will last for two years. SOCs are able to operate within any environment in the world, under any condition and circumstance. Therefore Dutch marines regularly train in arctic, jungle, desert, high-altitude, maritime and urban conditions, and embark on various training missions throughout the world. In these two years SOCs will work closely with MARSOF platoons throughout the world, and can choose to enlist for further specialization.

=== Specialisation ===
Experienced marines are able to obtain various specialisations. It is common for marines to have multiple specialisations. Popular specialisations include: weapons instructor, mortar, communications, or heavy weapons specialist, designated marksman, sniper, assault engineer, medic or free-fall para. Some of these specialisations require the rank of Corporal before being able to follow specialisation training, and must not exceed a maximum age.

== Tradition ==
=== Uniforms ===
The Corps has multiple distinctive uniforms. The Corps' standard combat uniform is based on the Battle Dress Uniform (BDU) in the woodland pattern, as opposed to the Disruptive Pattern Material (DPM)-based combat uniform of the other services of the Netherlands Armed Forces. This combat uniform is due to be replaced by new uniforms in the Netherlands Fractal Pattern from 2023 onwards. Operators of NLMARSOF and other selected units wear combat uniforms in the commercial MultiCam pattern.

The service dress uniform can be worn during everyday office, barracks and non-field duty purposes. The uniform consists of trousers with red piping and a single breasted jacket (both in dark-blue fabric), a white dress shirt with a black necktie and headgear (beret or peaked cap). The uniform can be supplemented with brown leather gloves, decorations worn in Prussian arrangement and a belt with a holster.

The mess dress uniform is worn during formal occasions, such as a dinner or a ball and consists of a mess jacket, trousers with red piping, white shirt, and black bow tie complemented with a peaked cap and miniature medals.

The full dress uniform consists of a dark-blue jacket with a red standing collar, dark-blue trousers with red piping, orange sash (worn by officers), pith helmet, fourragères, white gloves and a sabre.

Unlike the United States Marine Corps and the Royal Marines which use army rank insigna, the Corps uses naval rank insignia on all uniforms.

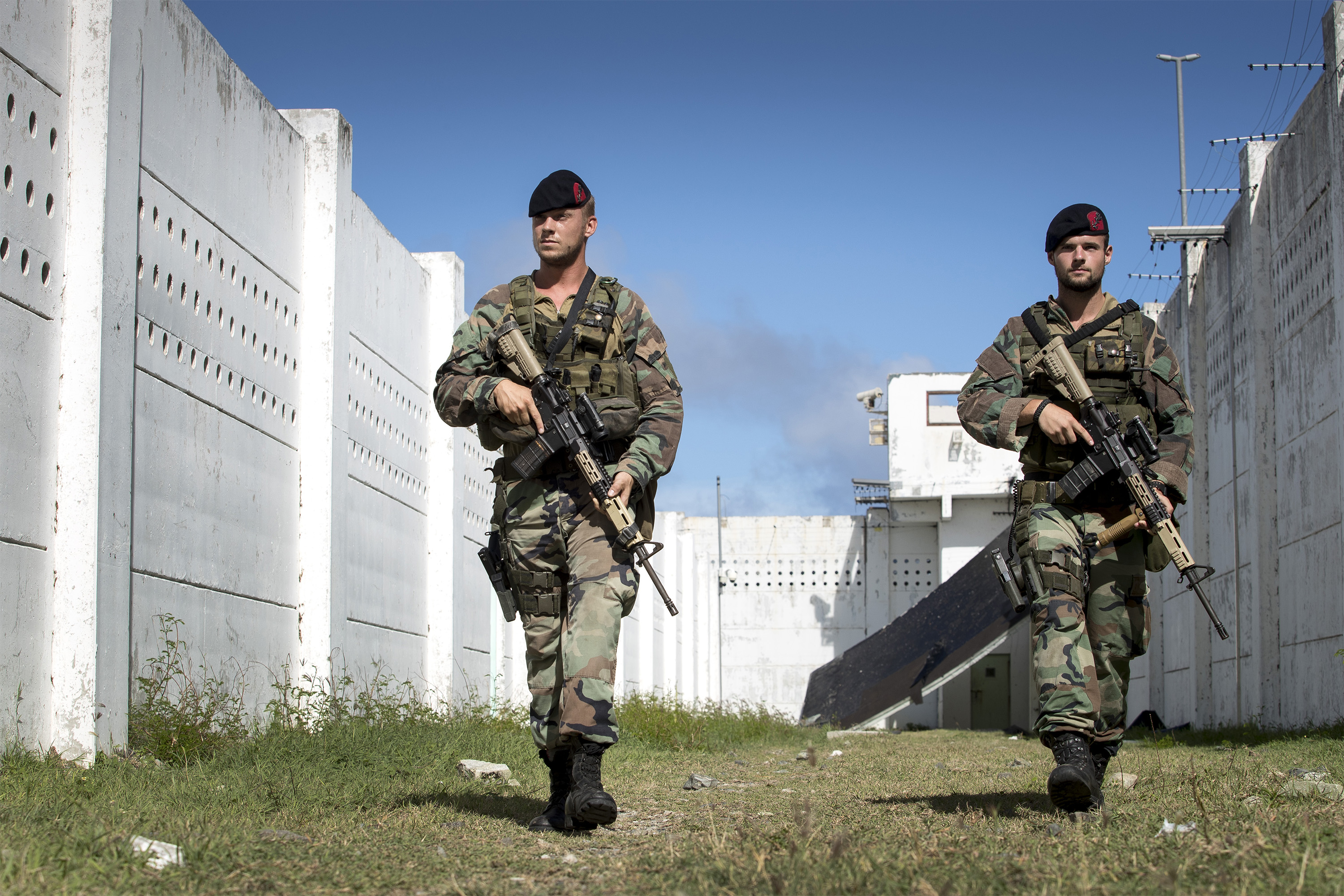
Woodland pattern on Battle Dress Uniform worn by marines on Sint Maarten, in 2017.

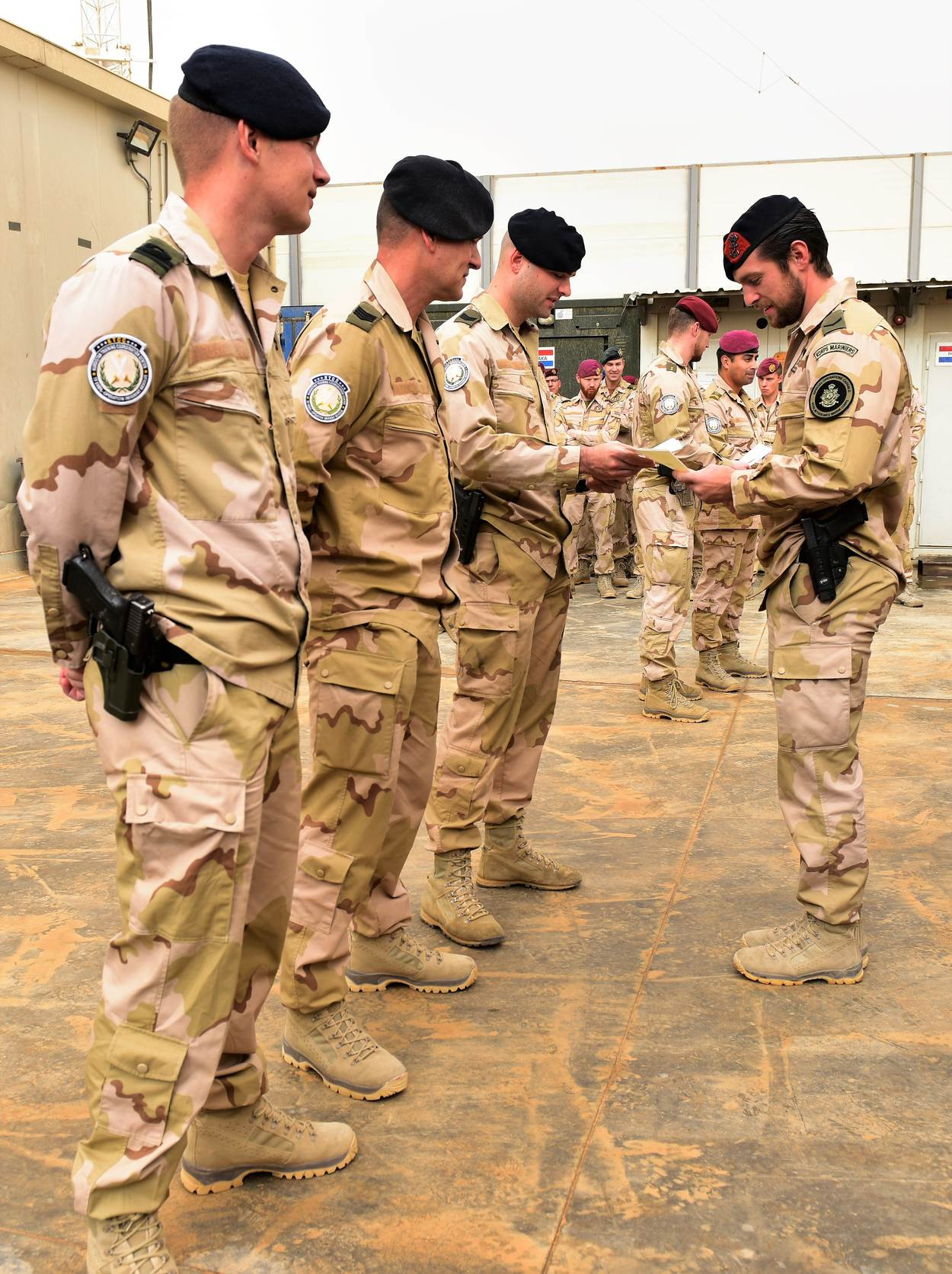
Desert Camouflage Uniform worn by marines during the Capacity Building Mission Iraq

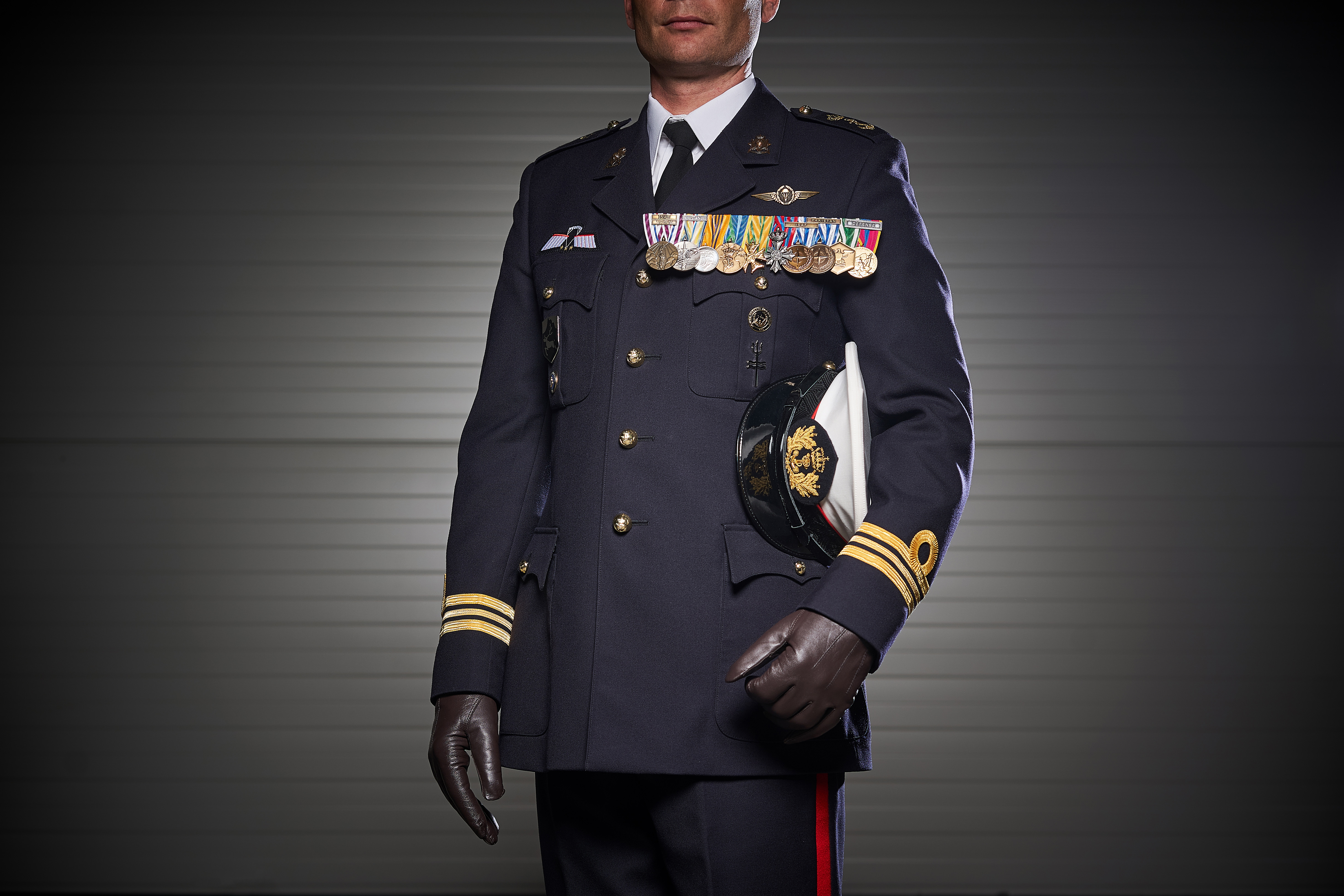
Service dress uniform of a Major, decorations are worn in the Prussian arrangement.

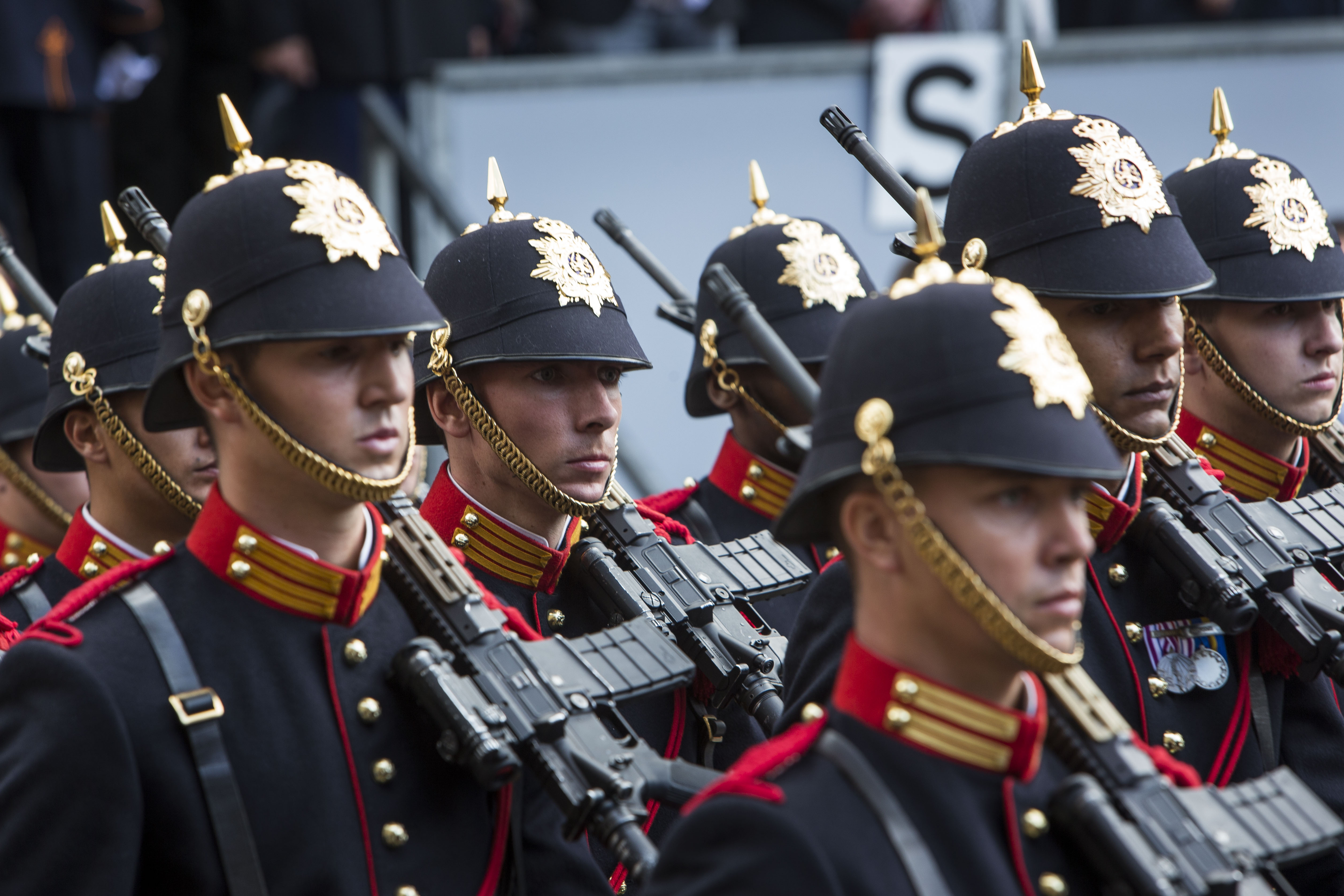
Marines wearing the full dress uniform during the annual parade on Prinsjesdag.

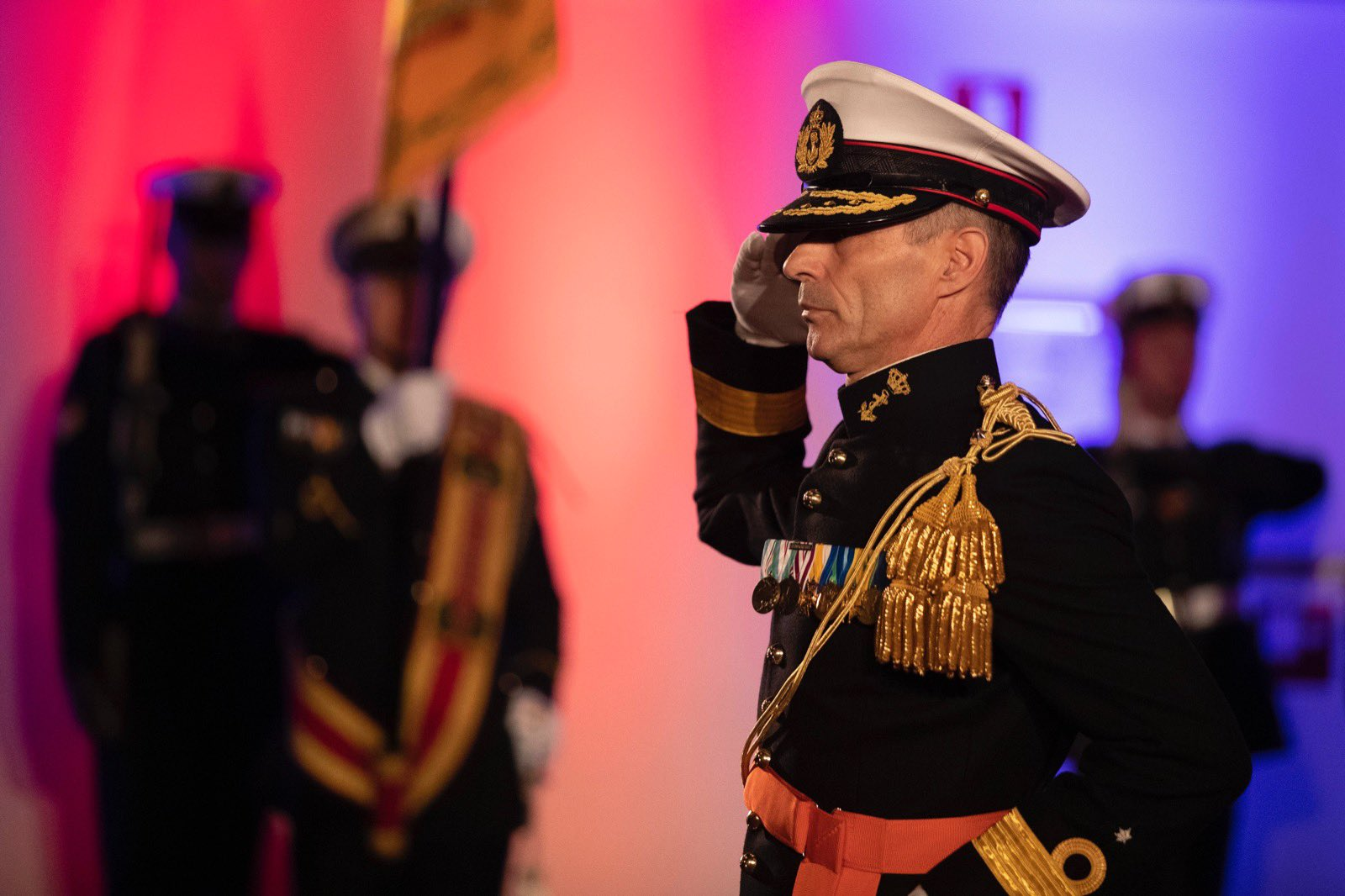
Special dress uniform worn by the commander of the Corps.

=== Colours ===
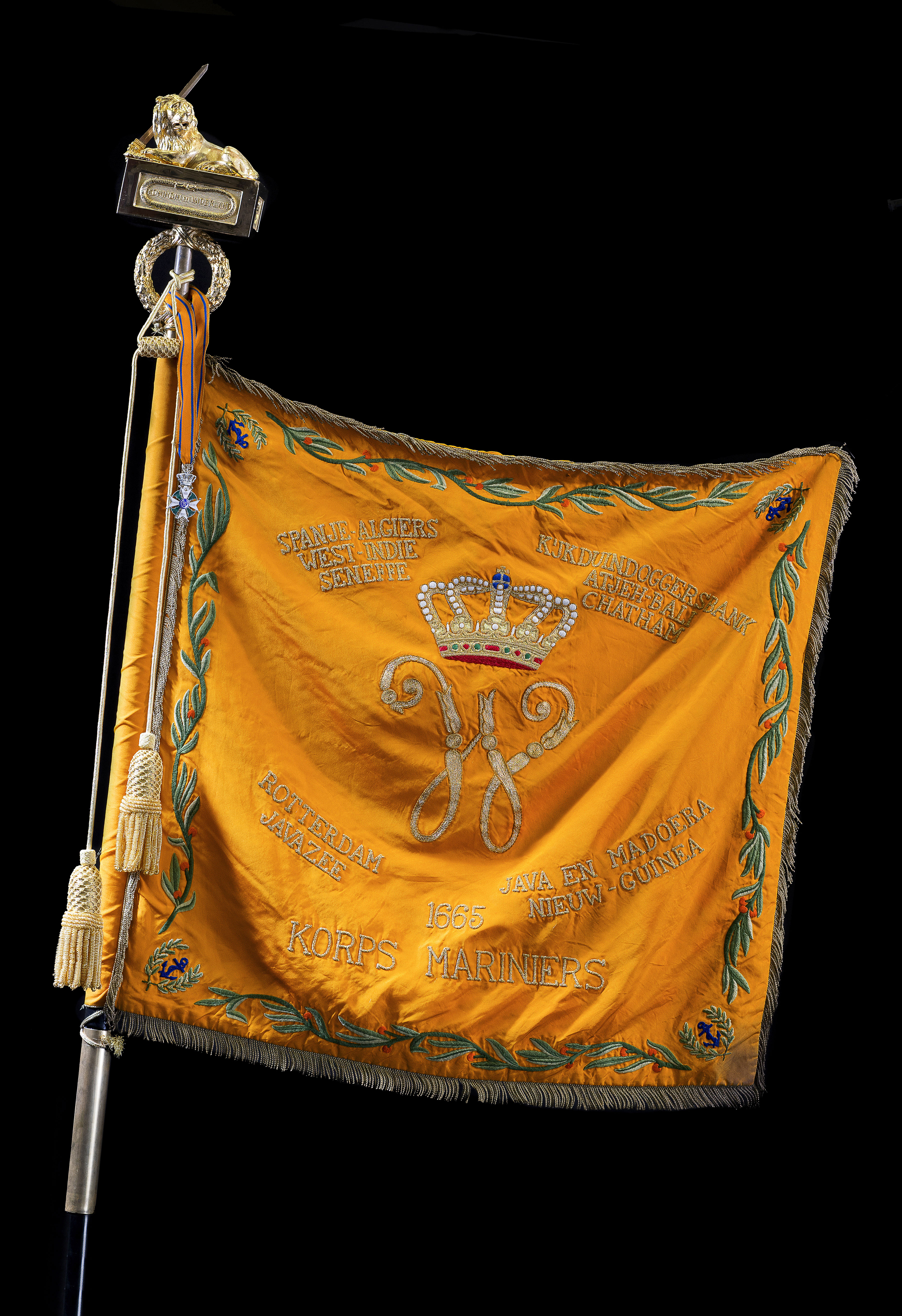
The colours of the Korps Mariniers pictured in 2015.

The Netherlands Marine Corps was granted a colour (Dutch: vaandel) by Queen Wilhelmina on 16 September 1929 and was renewed in 1988. The colour forms the embodiment of the history and character of the Corps. In contrast to the functional use of colours in the past, during which they served as landmarks on the battlefield, the contemporary role has been greatly reduced. Nonetheless, the colour continues to play an important role during various military ceremonies. For example, soldiers swear the oath of enlistment while holding the colour. Moreover, the colour constitutes an important connection between the Corps and the Royal House of the Netherlands. Only the sovereign can grant a military unit a colour or standard, therefore the royal cypher of the monarch that granted the regiment its (original) colour is displayed. In addition, the colour is inscribed with (historical) battle honours. By prominently displaying them, the aim is to add to the esprit de corps, uphold the collective memory and serve as inspiration for future actions.

The colour of the Korps Mariniers is distinct from other Dutch colours by the display of blue anchors in the four corners. The lanyard of the Military William Order, which it was granted in 1946 for actions in World War II, is permanently attached to the colour as well. The battle honours as they appear on the Korps Mariniers' colours are: Spanje - Algiers, West-Indië, Seneffe, Kijkduin - Doggersbank, Atjeh - Bali, Chatham, Rotterdam, Javazee, Java - Madoera, Nieuw-Guinea. In 2019, it was announced that the Corps was being granted a new battle honour for display on the colour for actions in Afghanistan; Helmand - Kandahar - Uruzgan.

== Ranks and insignia ==
NATO code	OF-10	OF-9	OF-8	OF-7	OF-6	OF-5	OF-4	OF-3	OF-2	OF-1
Netherlands Marine Corps
Netherlands Marine Corps		Generaal	Luitenant-generaal	Generaal-majoor	Brigade-generaal	Kolonel	Luitenant-kolonel	Majoor	Kapitein	1e Luitenant	2e Luitenant
English equivalent		General	Lieutenant General	Major General	Brigadier	Colonel	Lieutenant Colonel	Major	Captain	Lieutenant	Second Lieutenant

NATO code	OR-9	OR-8	OR-7	OR-6	OR-5	OR-4	OR-3	OR-2		OR-1
Netherlands Marine Corps										No insignia
Netherlands Marine Corps	Adjudant-onderofficier		Sergeant-majoor	Sergeant		Korporaal		Marinier der 1e klasse	Marinier der 2e klasse	Marinier der 3e klasse
English equivalent	Warrant Officer		Sergeant Major	Sergeant		Corporal		Lance corporal	Private 1st Class	Marine

== United Kingdom/Netherlands Amphibious Force (UK/NL AF) ==
Since 1972, units of the Netherlands Marine Corps have formed part of the British 3 Commando Brigade during exercises and real conflict situations. Also Mountain Warfare /Force Reconnaissance Troop of C Squadron NLMARSOF will be placed under UK operational command as part of C Squadron, UK Special Boat Service. Together, these form the UK/NL AF. Either the First or the Second Marine Combat Group can be assigned as the Dutch contribution to this force. UK/NL AF contributes to the European Multinational Maritime Force (EMMF).

The cooperation between the Korps Mariniers and the Royal Marines has led to extensive integration in the areas of operations, logistics and materials. Within NATO this is seen as a prime example of what can be achieved in military integration.

The NLMC and Royal Marines have a long history of cooperation. During combined actions by the British and Dutch navies during the War of the Spanish Succession (1702–1713), amphibious operations were carried out, the most notable being the Capture of Gibraltar in 1704. During this action, a successful attack was carried out against the fortress of Gibraltar by an 1800-strong brigade of Dutch and British Marines under the command of Prince George of Hesse-Darmstadt. Both corps share this battle honour.

The British and Dutch armed forces share close relations. The Royal Marines and Netherlands Marine Corps are allied through a 'Bond of friendship'.

The nickname of the Dutch Marines among their British Royal Marine counterparts is "Cloggies," due to the stereotype that most or all Dutch wear clogs, instead of normal footwear.

On 7 July 2026, on the sidelines of the NATO summit in Ankara, UK Prime Minister Keir Starmer and Dutch Prime Minister Rob Jetten signed a £2.4 billion (US$3.2 billion) maritime partnership agreement to strengthen bilateral naval cooperation and support the joint procurement of new amphibious transport ships. The deal equips British and Dutch forces with eight advanced amphibious transport ships (four for each nation) to strengthen allied.

== Alliances ==
- (United Kingdom) Royal Marines (Bond of Friendship)
- United States Marine Corps (Bond of Friendship)
- (Germany) Seebataillon (German Marines integrated into the Korps Mariniers)
- (Belgium) Special Operations Regiment
