= AeroVironment FQM-151 Pointer =

Small unmanned aerial vehicle

FQM-151 Pointer
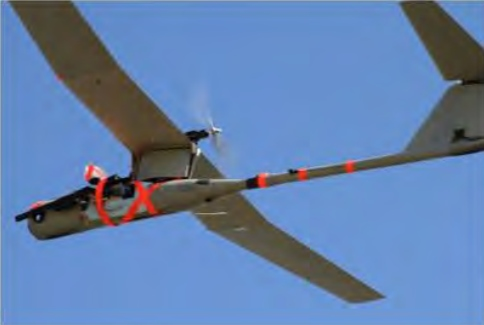

General information
- Type: Miniature UAV
- National origin: United States
- Manufacturer: AeroVironment

History
- First flight: 1988
- Developed into: RQ-11 Raven

The AeroVironment FQM-151 Pointer is a small UAV used by the United States Army and Marine Corps for battlefield surveillance. It was designed by AeroVironment Incorporated, formerly led by Paul MacCready, noted for such pioneering aircraft as the human-powered Gossamer Condor and a robotic flying pterodactyl replica. The Pointer was developed with company funds, with the US Army and Marine Corps obtaining a total of about 50 units beginning in 1990.

The radio-controlled Pointer was built mostly of high-impact Kevlar. It resembled hobbyist's RC sailplane with a small engine added, with the wing standing up above the fuselage on a pylon and a pusher propeller on the wing behind the pylon. A lithium battery pack powered the UAV's compact electric motor to rotate the propeller. The little Pointer was hand-launched. It was recovered simply by putting it into a flat spin, allowing it to flutter down to the ground.

The Pointer carried a CCD camera fixed in its nose, meaning it had to be directly pointed at its target to see it, which is how the machine got its name. The CCD camera had a resolution of 360 x 380 pixels and a viewing aperture of 22 x 30 degrees. Video could be fed back to the ground station by radio or fiber-optic link.

The ground station recorded flight imagery on an eight-millimeter video cassette recorder. Digital compass headings were superimposed on the imagery and the controller could add verbal comments. The imagery could be inspected with normal, freeze-frame, fast, or slow-motion replay. The aircraft system and the ground control station were carried in separate backpacks. It required a pilot and an observer.

The Pointers in US military service have now been upgraded with a GPS/INS capability, and it has led to a number of derivatives. chapter. The Pointer itself remains in use, having seen action during the intervention in Afghanistan in 2001 and the invasion of Iraq in 2003.

== Specifications ==
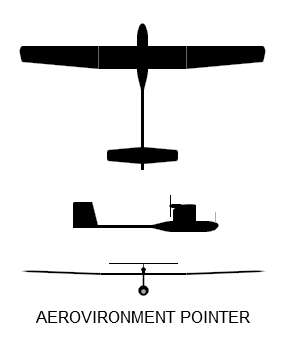

General characteristics

- Crew: None
- Length: 6 ft 0 in (1.83 m)
- Wingspan: 9 ft 0 in (2.74 m)
- Gross weight: 9.0 lb (4.0 kg)
- Powerplant: 1 × electric motor , 2/5 hp (0.3 kW)

Performance

- Maximum speed: 46 mph (73 km/h, 40 kn)
- Endurance: 1 hours
- Service ceiling: 1,000 ft (300 m)

== See also ==
Related development

- AeroVironment RQ-11 Raven
