= Forward Operating Base Budwan =

FOB Budwan ~~FOB Armadillo~~
- Nahri Saraj District, Helmand Province in Afghanistan

Site information
- Owner: International Security Assistance Force (ISAF)
- Operator: British Armed Forces; Royal Danish Army; Afghan National Army (ANA)

Location
- Shown within Afghanistan
- Coordinates: 31°53′41″N 064°42′00″E

Site history
- Built: January 2008
- In use: 2008-2011

Airfield information
- Elevation: 869 metres (2,851 ft) AMSL
Helipads
| Number | Length and surface |
|---|---|
| 00 | Concrete |

Forward Operating Base Budwan, or more simply, FOB Budwan, was a military base located near Gereshk, in the Helmand province of Afghanistan. It was occupied by International Security Assistance Force (ISAF) forces from the United Kingdom and Denmark as part of Task Force Helmand during Operation Herrick (OP H).

The base was originally named FOB Armadillo after the mascot of a Danish company commander, Major Anders Stæhr Storrud, who was killed three months before the base was established. The base was then renamed to FOB Budwan in 2010.

== History ==
It was one of three smaller forward operating bases (FOBs) used by British and Danish forces around Gereshk (the others being FOB Sandford and FOB Keenan) in addition to their headquarters at FOB Price.

=== FOB Armadillo ===
- Created by 1st Battalion, Coldstream Guards and Reinforced by Specialist Members of 65 Field Support Sqn, 28 Engineer Reigment and the Danish.
- Guard Hussar Regiment, Charlie Company Feb - Jul 2009
- Guard Hussar Regiment with AeroVironment RQ-11 Raven Unmanned aerial vehicles and Piranha's
  - Charlie Company during May 2010

It has been used by:

- OP H IX - 3 Commando Brigade (October 2008 - April 2009):
- OP H X - 19th Light Brigade (April 2009 - October 2009):
- OP H XI - 11 Light Brigade (October 2009 - April 2010):

The base was renamed in 2010 to Budwan

==== Film ====
A Danish documentary film of the same name released in 2010, followed a group of Danish soldiers from the Guard Hussars stationed at the base.

=== FOB Budwan ===
It has been used by:

- OP H XII - 4th Mechanized Brigade (April 2010 - October 2010):
  - 4th Regiment Royal Artillery with members of 4th Field Regiment, Royal Australian Artillery
    - Cutler Troop
- OP H XIII - 16 Air Assault Brigade (October 2010 - April 2011):
  - 7th Parachute Regiment Royal Horse Artillery (for the tour only)
    - J (Sidi Rezegh) Battery RHA with gunners from the 1st Field Regiment, Royal Australian Artillery.

The closing and disassembling of Budwan started in December 2010. The last troops and equipment left in late January 2011. The units stationed there were relocated to other bases around Gereshk.

== See also ==
- List of ISAF installations in Afghanistan
