= Marinekazerne Suffisant =

Building in Kingdom of the Netherlands

Suffisant Naval Barracks
- Marinekazerne Suffisant
- Willemstad, Curaçao
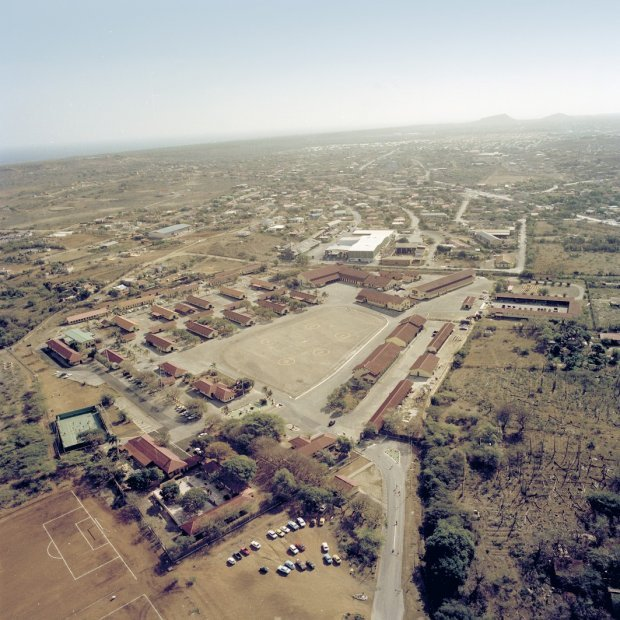
- Aerial photograph of the barracks in 1978

Site information
- Controlled by: Kingdom of the Netherlands
- Open to the public: No
- Condition: Operational

Location
- Coordinates: 12°9′2.56″N 68°54′58.96″W

Site history
- Built: 1929

Garrison information
- Current commander: Major Eric Lieftink
- Garrison: Royal Netherlands Navy, Royal Marechaussee

Suffisant Naval Barracks (Dutch:Marinekazerne Suffisant) is a Dutch armed forces base located on Curaçao. Until 2009, it was used by the infantry company 31 INFCIE of the Netherlands Marine Corps. Currently the base is used for the conscription of Curaçaoan youths. However, rather than being purely military in nature, the conscription also serves a social purpose: conscripts can get an education and receive diplomas on the base. During the first six months the conscripts receive military training and in the remaining six months they study to obtain a diploma. The conscripts are called miliciens. Currently the Royal Marechaussee has a brigade stationed on the base as well.

== History ==
The history of the Netherlands Marine Corps on Suffisant Naval Barracks began in 1929 after Venezuelan Rafael Simón Urbina together with a group of followers tried to take over Fort Amsterdam on Curaçao. The Netherlands sent the Marine Corps to provide external security for the Dutch ABC islands. Another reason was to provide resistance against internal riots, strikes and protests. During World War II local conscripts from the Dutch Caribbean were trained by Dutch marines. Many of these conscripts served from Suffisant Naval Barracks. The base was at that time the largest on Curaçao. Local and Dutch forces worked together closely with forces from the United States for the defence of all Dutch Caribbean islands.

On 16 June 2009, after a presence of 80 years on the island, the 31 INFCIE of the Netherlands Marine Corps on Curaçao was disbanded. Since that date only a small number of marines have remained, mainly to train the Curaçaoan conscripts.

In March 2013, the Kingdom of the Netherlands Minister of Defence, Jeanine Hennis-Plasschaert, and the Chief of Defence, Tom Middendorp, visited Suffisant Naval Barracks to inspect the miliciens. The base had earlier received a royal visit when Queen Beatrix visited in November 2006.

From June until September 2013, one of the suspects involved in the murder of politician Helmin Wiels was locked up in the Royal Marechaussee building on the base. The base was barricaded during the detention of the suspect.
