= Mike Scotti =

American author & Marine

Mike Scotti in 2026

Mike Scotti is a former U.S. Marine and author of The Blue Cascade: A Memoir of Life After War (Hachette/Grand Central). He is the subject, narrator and co-producer of the documentary film Severe Clear (released outside the U.S. as This is War). The film uses his personal combat footage to chronicle his time in Iraq.

== Career ==
Scotti held the rank of First Lieutenant in Marine Corps Bravo Company, 1st Battalion 4th Marines.

Mike Scotti has appeared on various programs, including "Last Call" with Carson Daly. He is a recipient of the Fort Lee Film Commission's Lewis J. Selznick Award for filmmaking, and he has also been a storyteller with NPR's The Moth Mainstage.

His 2009 documentary film, Severe Clear, was directed by American documentary maker Kristian Fraga, starring and using footage shot by Scotti. The film explores the Marine drive to Baghdad during the 2003 invasion of Iraq.

Severe Clear achieved a Special Mention for Cinematic Excellence at the 2009 International Rome Film Festival. The film also received the Jury Prize at the Salem Film Fest.
