= AeroVironment RQ-11 Raven =

Family of unmanned reconnaissance aircraft

RQ-11 Raven
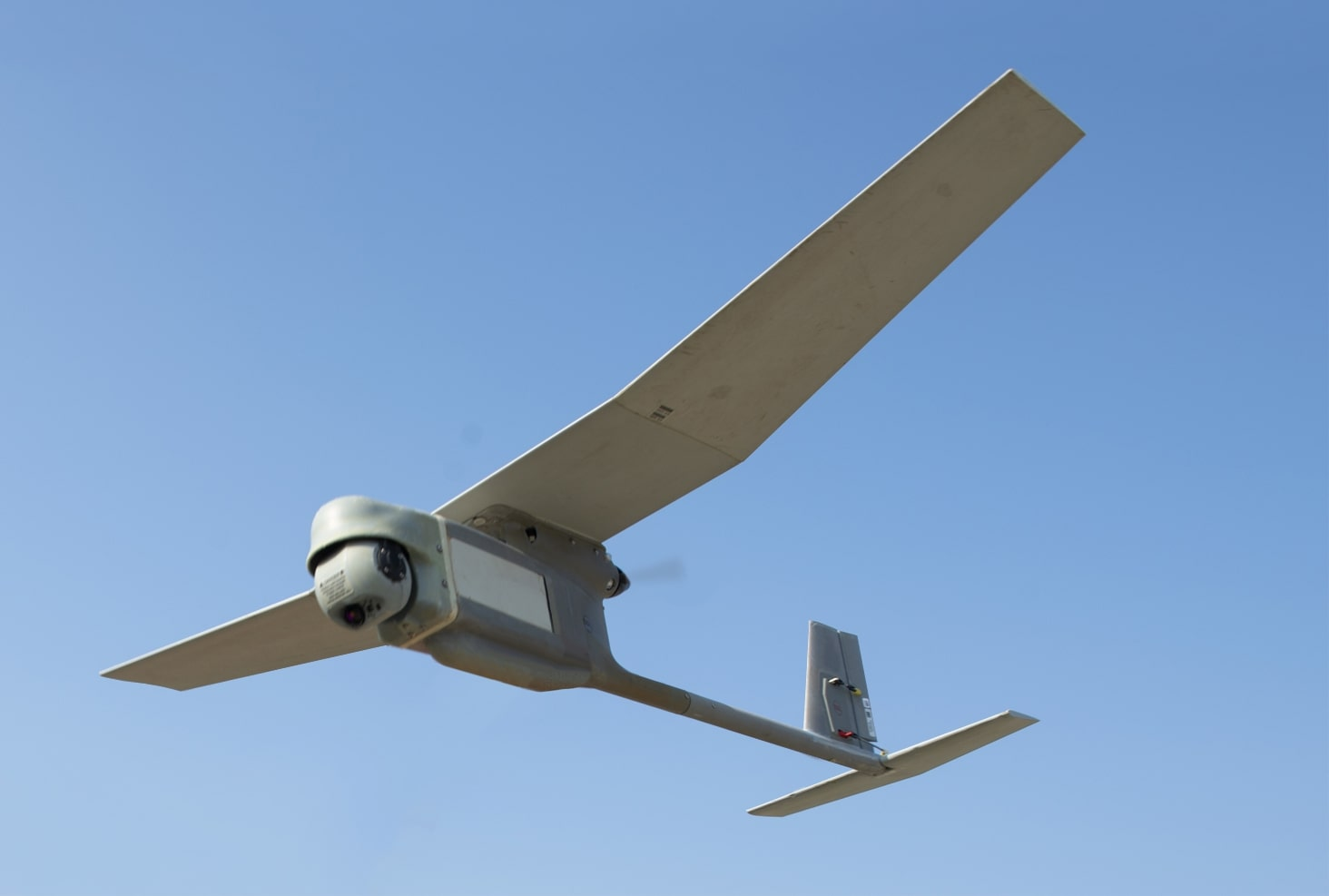
- An RQ-11 Raven UAV in flight

General information
- Type: Miniature UAV
- Manufacturer: AeroVironment
- Status: In active service
- Primary users: United States Army United States Air Force
- Number built: 19,000+ airframes

History
- Manufactured: 2004–present
- Introduction date: May 2003
- First flight: October 2001
- Developed from: FQM-151 Pointer

The AeroVironment RQ-11 Raven is a small hand-launched remote-controlled unmanned aerial vehicle (or SUAV) developed for the United States military, but now adopted by the military forces of many other countries.

The RQ-11 Raven was originally introduced as the FQM-151 in 1999, but in 2002 developed into its current form, resembling an enlarged FAI class F1C free flight model aircraft in general appearance. The craft is launched by hand and powered by a pusher configuration electric motor. The plane can fly up to 10 km at altitudes of 100-500 m above ground level, and over 4,200 m above mean sea level, at flying speeds of 32-81 km/h. The U.S. Army deploys the Raven at company-level.

== Design and development ==
The Raven RQ-11B UAS is manufactured by AeroVironment. It was the winner of the US Army's SUAV program in 2005, and went into Full-Rate Production (FRP) in 2006. Shortly afterwards, it was also adopted by the US Marines, and the US Air Force for their ongoing FPASS Program. It has also been adopted by the military forces of many other countries (see below). More than 19,000 Raven airframes have been delivered to customers worldwide to date. A new Digital Data Link-enabled version of Raven now in production for US Forces and allies has improved endurance, among many other improvements.

The Raven can be either remotely controlled from the ground station or fly completely autonomous missions using GPS waypoint navigation. The UA can be ordered to immediately return to its launch point by pressing a single command button. Standard mission payloads include CCD color video cameras and an infrared night vision camera.

The RQ-11B Raven UA weighs about 1.9 kg (4.2 lb), has a flight endurance of 60–90 minutes and an effective operational radius of approximately 10 km (6.2 miles).

The RQ-11B Raven UA is launched by hand, thrown into the air like a free flight model airplane. The Raven lands itself by auto-piloting to a pre-defined landing point and then performing a 45° slope (1 foot down for every 1 foot forward) controlled "Autoland" descent. The UAS can provide day or night aerial intelligence, surveillance, target acquisition, and reconnaissance.

In mid-2015, the US Marine Corps tested Harris Corporation's Small Secure Data Link (SSDL), a radio device that fits onto a Raven's nose to provide beyond line-of-sight communications for Marines down to squad level. Acting as communications nodes for ground forces has become an important function for UASs, but has been restricted to larger platforms like the RQ-4 Global Hawk or RQ-21 Blackjack. Being certified for 'Secret' classification and at just 25 cubic inches (410 cm^{3}) (measuring 3 in × 5.3 in × 1.6 in) and weighing 18 oz (510 g), the Harris SSDL allows the small Raven UAS to extend communications for troops in the field.

In August 2015, selected units began receiving upgrades to their Raven sensors. The Raven Gimbal is a rotating camera with a 360-degree gimbal, which replaces the fixed camera that required maneuvering the aircraft to observe. The new camera can be switched between day and night settings without landing and swapping sensors. In August 2017, Belgium bought 32 Raven-drones; Luxembourg bought 16.

== Variants ==
- RQ-11A Raven A (no longer in production)
- RQ-11B Raven B
- CU-173 Raven B - version for the Canadian Armed Forces
- Solar Raven – In November 2012, the Air Force Research Laboratory integrated 20 cm^{2} (3.1 in^{2}) flexible solar panels into the Raven platform's wing sections using a clear, protective plastic film and an adhesive to augment the existing battery power system, increasing endurance by 60%. Future improvements include improving the durability of the solar panels and reducing their weight. Integration work is also being conducted on the AeroVironment Wasp and the RQ-20 Puma.

== Operators ==
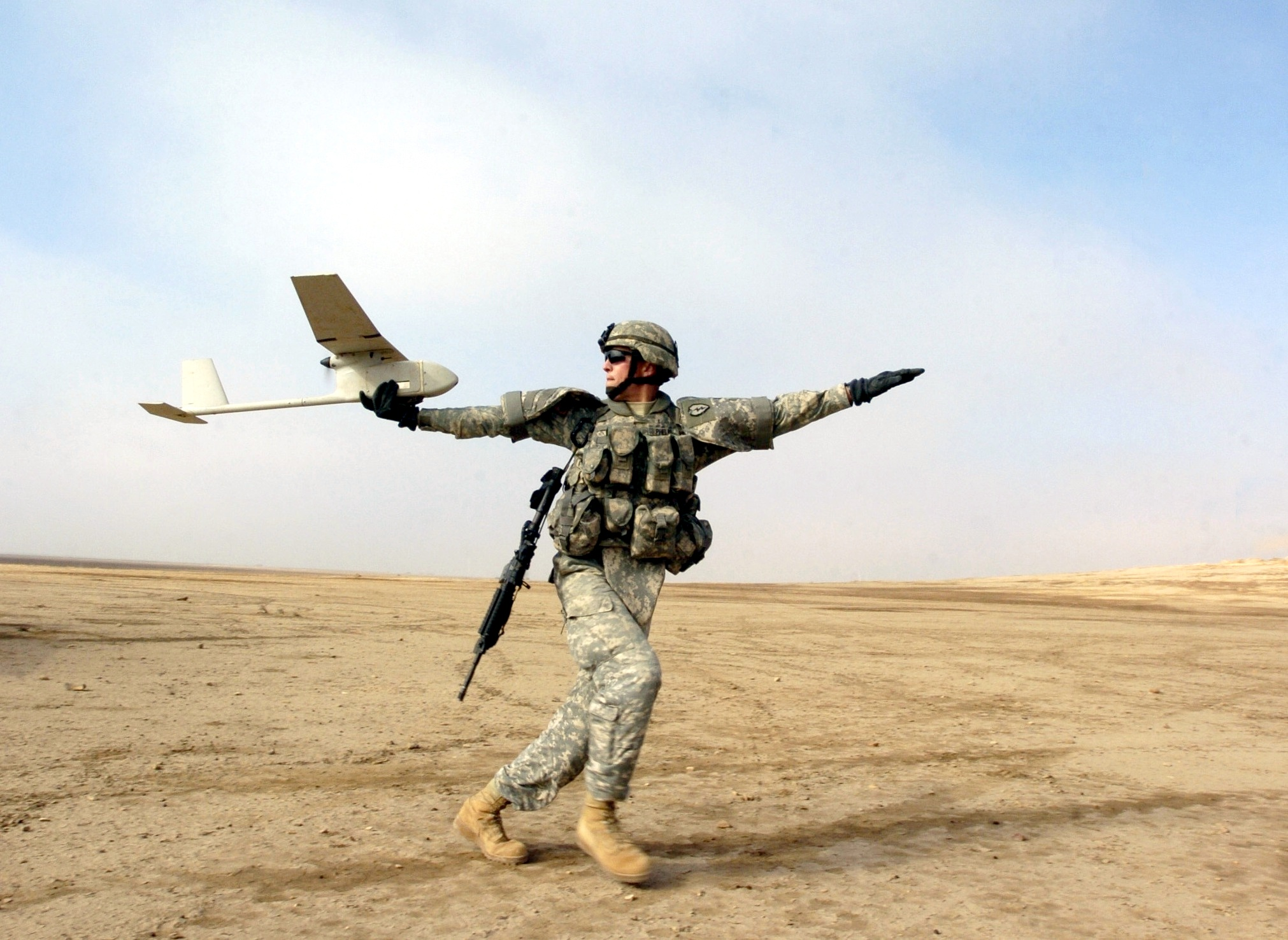
A soldier prepares to launch the Raven in Iraq

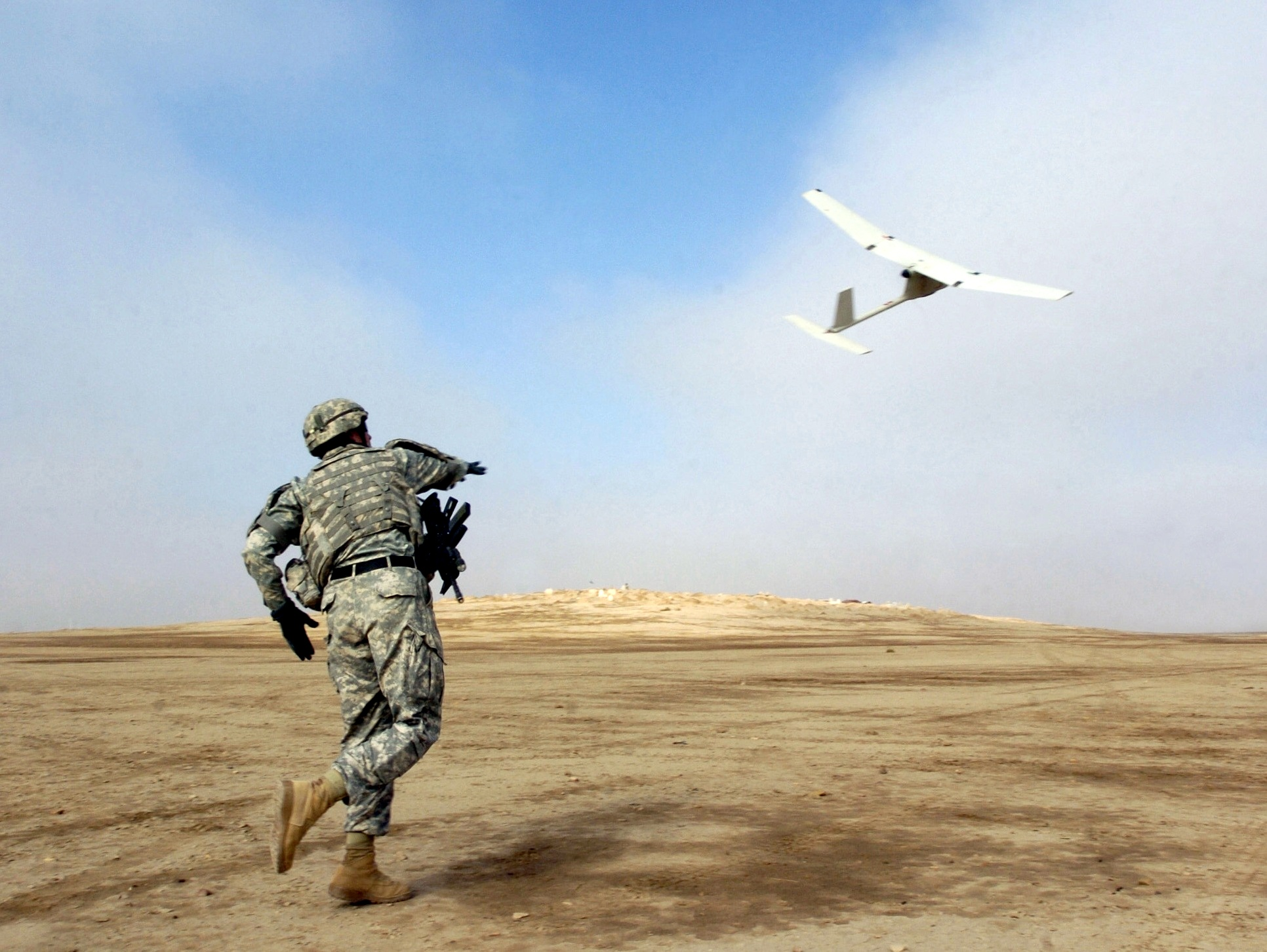
The Raven is launched.

The Raven is used by the United States Army, Air Force, Marine Corps, and Special Operations Command. Additionally, foreign customers include Australia, Estonia, Italy, Denmark, Spain and Czech Republic. As of early 2012, over 19,000 airframes have already been shipped, making it the most widely adopted UAV system in the world today.

The British forces in Iraq used Raven equipment. The Royal Danish Army acquired 12 Raven systems in September 2007; three systems will be delivered to the Huntsmen Corps, while the remainder will be deployed with soldiers from the Artillery Training Center. A 2010 documentary film, Armadillo, shows Danish forces deploying a Raven in operations around FOB Armadillo in the Helmand province of Afghanistan. The drone also makes an appearance being used by the SEAL operators in the 2012 film Act of Valor.

The Netherlands MoD has acquired 72 operational RQ-11B systems with a total value of $23.74 million for use within Army reconnaissance units, its Marine Corps and its Special Forces (KCT). At the turn of the year 2009 to 2010 the systems were deployed above the village Veen, as part of the Intensification of Civil-Military Cooperation. In 2012 and 2013 the Raven was loaned by the Defense department to the police department of Almere to combat burglary.

In April 2011, the U.S. announced that it would be supplying 85 Raven B systems to the Pakistan Army.

In June 2011, the U.S. announced $145.4 million in proposed aid for anti-terror efforts in north and east Africa, including four Raven systems to be used by forces from Uganda and Burundi as part of the ongoing African Union peacekeeping mission in Somalia. The US has also announced its intent to supply an unspecified number of Ravens to the Ukrainian armed forces. Ukrainian operators criticized the Raven's analog control system that made them vulnerable to jamming and hacking by sophisticated Russian-backed separatists.

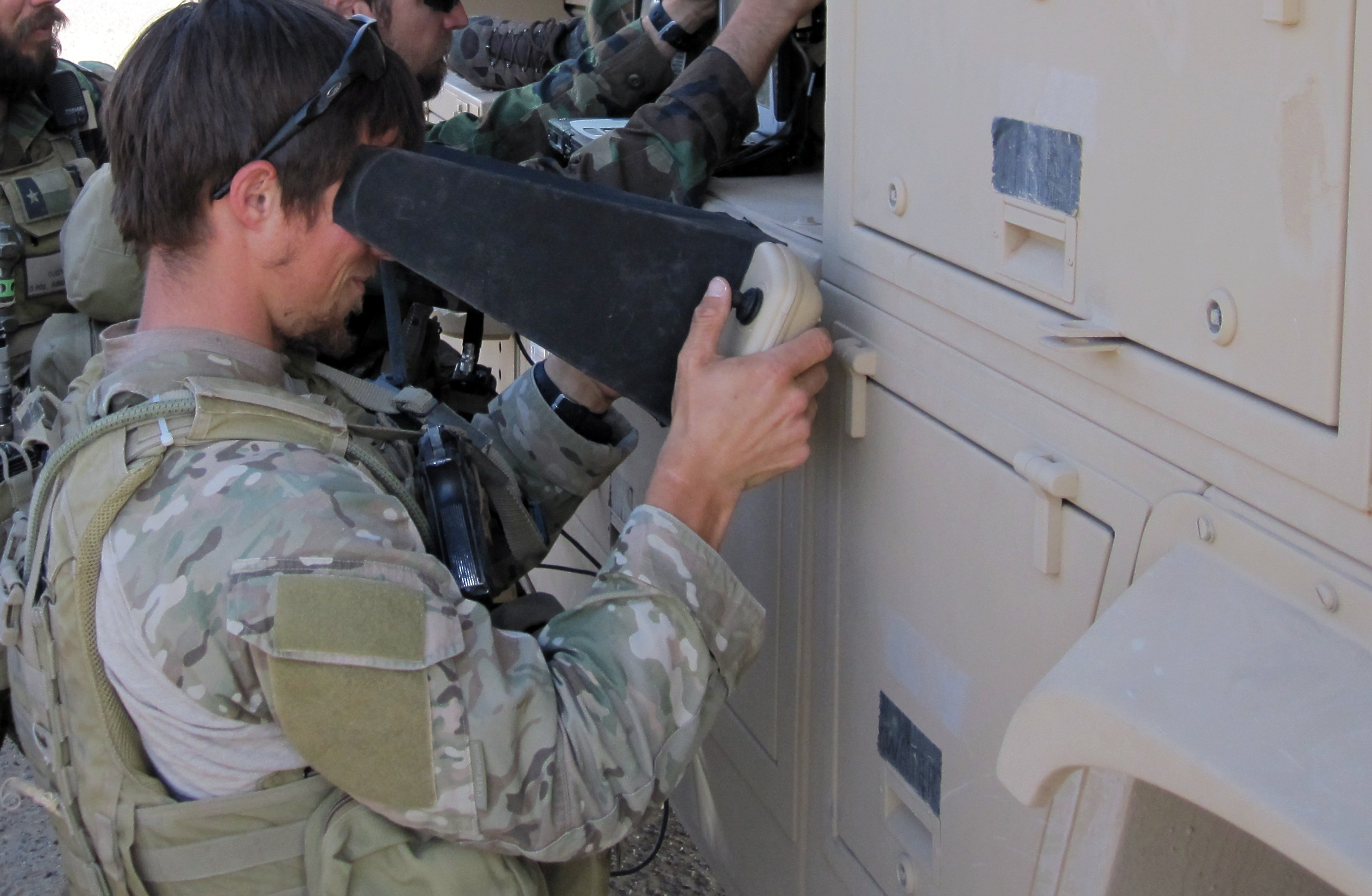
Flight control module.

Iran has claimed it has captured two RQ-11, one "in Shahrivar 1390 (August 21 – September 19, 2011) and the other one in Aban (October 22 – November 20, 2012)". It also indicated that "much of the data of these drones has been decoded", but did not indicate whether the drone has been duplicated, as has been done with the RQ-170 and the Boeing Insitu ScanEagle.

In September 2016, the Kenya Army was introduced to the Raven, and would "now be able to take lessons learned from the Raven training and apply them" on operations.

In January 2023, the U.S. Marine Corps revealed they had retired the RQ-11B Raven SUAS in favor of the FLIR Systems R80 SkyRaider, a VTOL UAV that is easier to launch and recover and can provide a hover-and-stare surveillance capability.

=== Current operators ===
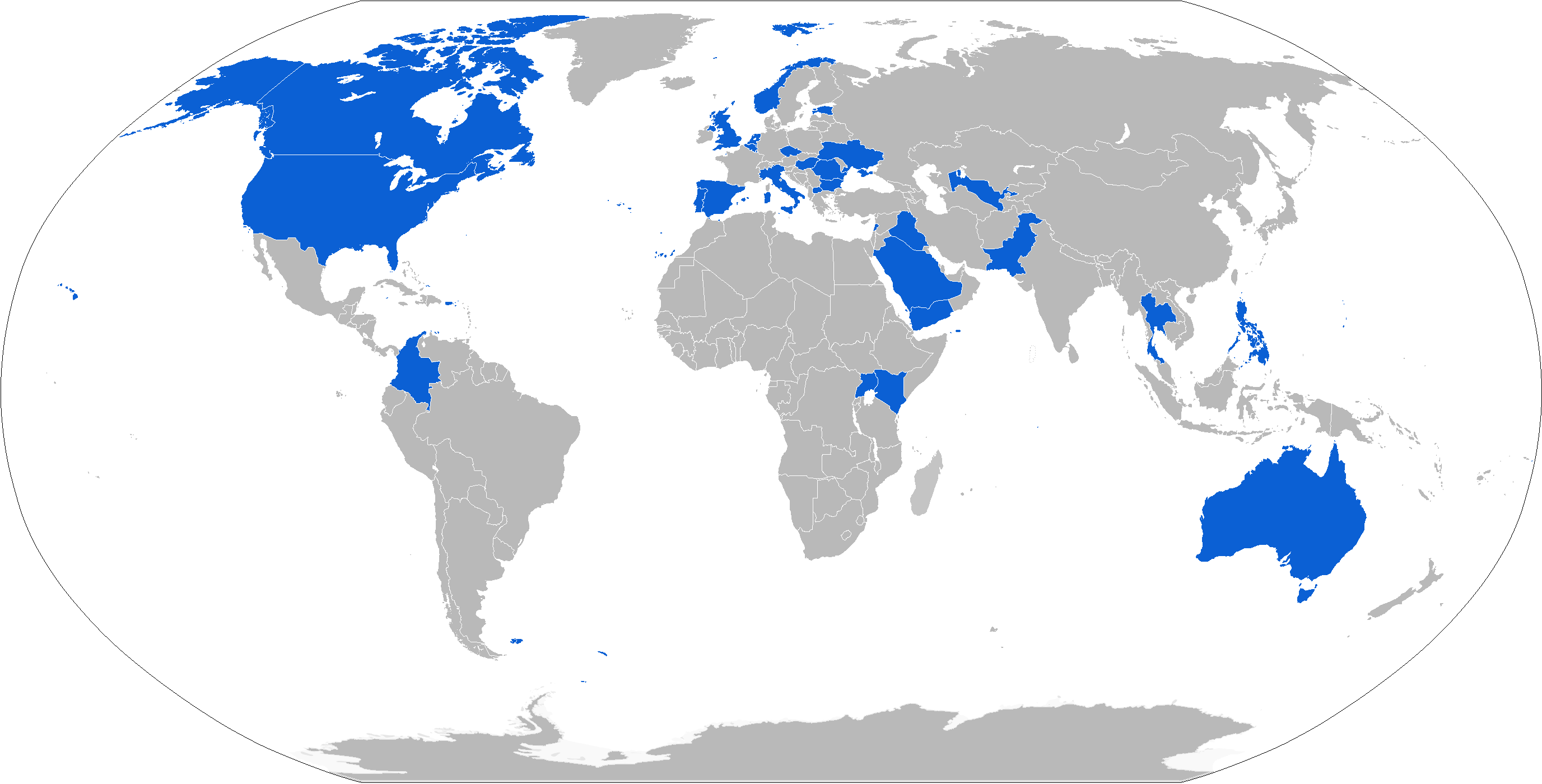
Map with military AeroVironment RQ-11 Raven operators in blue

Australia

- Australian Armed Forces

Austria

- Austrian Armed Forces

Belgium

- Belgian Armed Forces

Bulgaria

- Bulgarian Armed Forces

Canada

- Canadian Armed Forces

Colombia

- Colombian Armed Forces

Costa Rica

- Public Force of Costa Rica

Czech Republic

- Czech Armed Forces

Estonia

- Estonian Armed Forces

Hungary

- Hungarian Armed Forces

Iraq

- Iraqi Armed Forces

Italy

- Italian Armed Forces

Kenya

- Kenyan Armed Forces - Kenya Army "Military Intelligence Battalion members received basic training on assembly, disassembly, repair, and preventative maintenance for the AeroVironment RQ-11 Raven as those topics relate to basic mission planning and advanced flight plans" during training held by personnel of 1st Battalion, 124th Infantry Regiment (ARNG), deployed to Combined Joint Task Force - Horn of Africa between September 8–24, 2016, at a training center in Kenya, giving the Kenyans "a new capability on the battlefield."

Lebanon

- Lebanese Armed Forces: 12 systems

Lithuania

- Lithuanian Armed Forces

Luxembourg

- Luxembourg Armed Forces

North Macedonia

- Macedonian Armed Forces

Netherlands

- Netherlands Armed Forces

Norway

- Norwegian Armed Forces

Pakistan

- Pakistan Army: 85 Raven B systems.

Philippines

- Armed Forces of the Philippines

Portugal

- Portuguese Armed Forces

Romania

- Romanian Armed Forces

Saudi Arabia

- Saudi Arabian Armed Forces

Slovakia

- Slovak Armed Forces

Spain

- Spanish Armed Forces

Thailand

- Thai Armed Forces

Uganda

- Ugandan Armed Forces - training given to Ugandan Air Force in December 2011.

Ukraine

- Ukrainian Armed Forces: 72 systems
- Ukrainian Air Guard

United Kingdom

- British Armed Forces

United States

- U.S. Armed Forces: 1,798 systems

Uzbekistan

- Uzbek Armed Forces

Yemen

- Yemeni Armed Forces

== Specifications ==
- Wingspan: 4.5 ft (1,37 m)
- Length: 3 ft (0,91 m)
- Weight: 4.2 lb (1,9 kg)
- Engine: Aveox 27/26/7-AV electric motor
- Cruising speed: approx. 18.64 mph (30.00 km/h)
- Range: 6.2 miles (10 km)
- Endurance: approx. 60–90 min

== See also ==
- Baykar Bayraktar Mini UAV
- DRDO Imperial Eagle
- EMT Aladin
- Unmanned Aerial Vehicle
- History of unmanned aerial vehicles

Related lists

- List of active United States military aircraft
