= Forward Operating Base Khar Nikah =

Former operating base in Helmand, Afghanistan

Khar Nikah (Keenan)
- Helmand Province, Afghanistan; Near Mirmandab, Upper Gereshk Valley in Afghanistan

Site information
- Type: FOB
- Owner: ISAF
- Operator: British Army
- Controlled by: British Army
- Open to the public: No
- Condition: Defunct

Location
- Shown within Afghanistan
- Coordinates: 31.85°N 64.70°E

Site history
- Built: 2007
- Built by: OP HERRICK 6 2007 - B Company, 1st Battalion The Worcestershire and Sherwood Foresters Regiment (29th/45th Foot)
- In use: 2012
- Battles/wars: Operation Achilles, Silicon, Silver, Mar Kardad, Lastay Kulang

Forward Operating Base Khar Nikah or more simply FOB Khar Nikah is a former Forward Operating Base in Afghanistan operated by the International Security Assistance Force (ISAF) under Operation Herrick (OP H).

It was formerly known as FOB Keenan, but renamed to Khar Nikah to increase local mental ownership.

Khar Nikah is a phrase in Pashto that refers to a marriage or wedding ceremony. It combines the Pashto word "nikah" (marriage) with the word "khar" which can mean "donkey" and is used as an insult, suggesting a forced or undesirable marriage.

Source: Google

== Units ==
FOB Keenan (2007-2010)

- OP H 6 (April – October 2007)
  - B Company, 1st Battalion, The Worcestershire and Sherwood Foresters Regiment (29th/45th Foot) (Renamed 2nd Battalion, The Mercian Regiment) built the base.
- OP H 7 (October 2007 - April 2008)
  - No. 10 Platoon, No. 3 Company, 1st Battalion, Coldstream Guards.
  - Signals Platoon
    - Support from Sniper Section, 1st Battalion, Coldstream Guards during December.
- OP H 8 (April 2008 - October 2008)
  - 5Scots (Argyll & Sutherland Highlanders) 2Scots Royal highland fusiliers) attached to 1st Battalion, The Royal Irish Regiment (27th (Inniskilling), 83rd, 87th and Ulster Defence Regiment) supported by - Imjin Company (2 R IRISH Territorial unit)

FOB Khar Nikah

- OP H12 (May - Oct 2010)
  - Gurkha Company, 1st Battalion, Mercian Regiment (Cheshire)
- OP H 13 (October 2010 - April 2011)
  - No. 2 Company, 1st Battalion, Irish Guards
- OP H 14 (May - Oct 2011)
  - C Company, 3rd Battalion, Mercian Regiment (formerly 'The Staffords')
- OP H 15 (Oct 2011 - May 2012)
  - The Royal Gurkha Rifles
- ISAF 11 (May - June 2011)
  - DK National Guard, Force Protection Platoon (-) and a DK CIMIC unit
- ANA, ANP and ALP
  - ANA, 2nd Kandak (and specifically its 3rd Company)
  - ANP/police elements and local trained ALP
