= Armadillo (2010 film) =

2010 Danish documentary film

- Directed by: Janus Metz
- Produced by: Ronnie Fridthjof
- Cinematography: Lars Skree
- Edited by: Per K. Kirkegaard
- Music by: Uno Helmersson
- Release dates: 16 May 2010 (Cannes); 27 May 2010 (Denmark)
- Running time: 101 minutes
- Country: Denmark
- Language: Danish

Armadillo is a 2010 Danish documentary film about Danish soldiers in the War in Afghanistan directed by Janus Metz. The film follows a group of soldiers from the Guard Hussars Regiment who are on their first mission in Helmand Province at a forward operating base near Gereshk named FOB Armadillo. The film premièred in the Critics' Week section at the 2010 Cannes Film Festival, where it won the Critics' Week Grand Prix.

The Critics' Week screening described the film as "a journey into the soldiers' minds and a unique film on the mythological story of man and war staged in its contemporary version in Afghanistan".

== Synopsis ==
The film starts with the soldiers' last days in Denmark before leaving for Afghanistan. Scenes include their emotional goodbyes as well as a party with a striptease dancer.

They are posted for a six-month tour at FOB Armadillo, a forward operating base in Helmand Province, Afghanistan, where some 270 Danish and British soldiers are based.

The film shows the soldiers going out on patrol. They hand out candy and gifts to the children. They question a local man about the Taliban who declines to cooperate and they return to base without incident.

The film depicts them as dividing their leisure time between maintaining their equipment and working out, calling home, playing shooter games and watching pornographic videos amongst other things.

Later in the tour, the soldiers encounter armed resistance from the Taliban. In the ensuing battles, buildings are damaged and locals report livestock killed. Some locals receive compensations from the base.

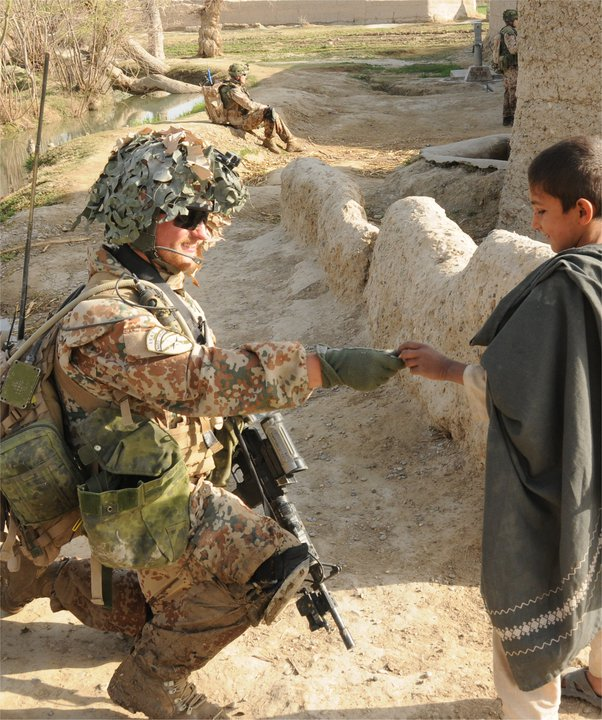
A Danish Guard Hussar interacts with the local population in Helmand Province, Afghanistan

A Danish commander becomes a victim of a roadside bomb and is evacuated to receive treatment for a skull fracture. He recovers and returns to Armadillo. Three Danish soldiers from a neighbouring camp die in an IED incident and the film records a memorial service for them. Directly following this there is a discussion over whether ambushing the Taliban will work and subsequently volunteers are recruited for a night patrol.

At dawn, civilians are seen fleeing the area. The patrol comes under fire and a soldier is hit. In the ensuing chaos the Taliban position is discovered to be directly in front of the patrol in a ditch only three metres away. A hand grenade is tossed into the ditch followed by the order to 'neutralize them' and subsequent sporadic gunfire is heard. Five Taliban are killed and there are graphic scenes of their bodies being pulled from the ditch and stripped of their weapons. It shows that the Taliban fighters were armed with a single RPG-7 rocket propelled grenade, two PK machine guns and one AKM. There is a subsequent air strike.

Back at base the patrol members congratulate each other on the morning's work and there is a debriefing with accounts of at least one Taliban fighter supposedly found alive but severely wounded in the ditch. There are further insinuations that any movement within the ditch would have represented a possible threat and that it was thus deemed necessary to spray the enemy fighters with another volley of bullets to make sure they are not a threat.

Subsequently, it transpires that a soldier has called home discussing the episode with his parents and has given them the impression that wounded Taliban had been liquidated and that the soldiers had laughed about it at the debriefing. The parents contacted the Danish Command about it and the ranking officer addresses his men about the issues that raises. A discussion amongst the men ensues.

Later two of the soldiers on the patrol are awarded medals and the film concludes with scenes of jubilant homecomings and, for some, a return to civilian life. The final scene is a close-up shot of water streaming down onto the head and face of an introspective commander while he is taking a shower.

== Reception ==
On the review aggregator website Rotten Tomatoes, 89% of 54 critics' reviews are positive, with an average rating of 7.6/10. The website's consensus reads: "Capturing both the lulls and terror during warfare, Armadillo is a viscerally filmed documentary that brings audiences alarmingly close to the frontlines of combat." Metacritic, which uses a weighted average, assigned the film a score of 72 out of 100, based on 14 critics, indicating "generally favorable" reviews.

A number of critics have expressed concern that the film blurs the divide between fact and fiction. Writing in The Globe and Mail, Guy Dixon remarks "there's another controversy of the more cinematic kind: While the footage is expertly photographed, all the different uses of filters and postproduction colour correction (to say nothing of the superb sound) – which gives the film an almost Apocalypse Now quality at times – is disturbing when we're talking not about the mythology and madness of war, but about showing real, dead people in a ditch or actual children running from fighting."

Politiken journalist Carsten Jensen said, "After Armadillo, it will not be possible to talk about Afghanistan, in the same way as before."

The film was nominated in four categories for the 2012 News & Documentary Emmy Award, and won the Editing category.

=== Controversy ===
The film generated a brief political controversy in Denmark when the Danish Socialist People's Party accused the soldiers of deliberately breaking the rules of engagement during one of the firefights, and demanded an investigation. Following procedure, the Danish Defence Judge Advocate Corps conducted an independent investigation, and the soldiers were cleared of any wrongdoing.

== See also ==
- Restrepo, a 2010 documentary about US soldiers stationed at an outpost in the Korangal Valley, Afghanistan
- Forward Operating Base Armadillo
- A War
