= List of equipment of the Royal Netherlands Army =

This is a list of the equipment of the Royal Netherlands Army.

== Personal equipment ==
=== Camouflage ===
Model	Image	Origin	Pattern type	Environment / colours	Notes
M19 NFP-Multitone Netherlands Fractal Pattern		Netherlands	Flecktarn	Universal	Standard camo used for carrying vest, Molle pouches and backpack.
M19 NFP-Green Netherlands Fractal Pattern		Netherlands	Flecktarn	Temperate / central-Europe / urban	Temperate camo is intended for uniform jackets, trousers, combat shirts, etc.
M19 NFP-Tan Netherlands Fractal Pattern		Netherlands	Flecktarn	Arid / desert	Desert alternative camo when required by the mission.

=== Uniforms ===
Model	Image	Origin	Type	Quantity	Notes
Interim combat clothing		Netherlands	Clothing	–	DOKS future combat clothing programme delayed (layered type clothing).

=== Protective equipment ===
Model	Image	Origin	Type	Quantity	Notes
Ballistic protection
Batlskin Viper P6N		Canada	Combat helmet	48,800	Supplied by Galvion. The helmet is covered by the appropriate M19 camouflage for the conditions (NFP-Green - Netherlands Fractal Pattern Green on the picture). UN blue variants exist, white camouflage for snow and other Dutch camouflage for other conditions.
Protectievest	protective vest with the Draagvest A worn over it	Netherlands	Bulletproof vest	7,000	Can be used with Draagvest A, and can be worn concealed under clothing. Soft and hard ballistic plates can be used. The hard plates are torso plates and side plates. Additional protection can be attached to the vest for the neck, shoulders, throat and groin. Part of the VOSS (Enhanced Operational Soldier System) project. NFP-Multitone camouflage.
TYR Tactical Female Enhanced EP'IC Integrated Carrier		United States	Bulletproof vest	1,530 (+ 7,000 option)	1,500 used for missions, 30 for research. NFP-Multitone camouflage.
Draagvest B		Netherlands	Bulletproof carrying vest	7,000	All-in-one system, with a quick release system. It has MOLLE loop system to mount pouches. The vest fits ballistic plates: custom-made soft, uni-size hard torso and side plates. Additional protection can be attached to the vest for neck, shoulders, throat and groin.
Soft ballistische platen	–	Netherlands	Soft ballistic plates	–	Exist for Protectievest and for Draagvest B
Hard ballistische platen	—	Netherlands	Hard ballistic plates	—	Exist for Protectievest and for Draagvest B
NBC protection
Avon FM5<0		Germany	Gas Mask / respirator	–	
DPM Hazmat suit level 4		–	NBC protection suit - level 4	–	

=== Load-carrying equipment ===
Model	Image	Origin	Type	Quantity	Notes
Draagvest A		Netherlands	Carrying vest	7,000	MOLLE loop system to mount pouches. Almost always used with the bulletproof vest Protectievest.
9-liter backpack		Netherlands	Tactical backpack	7,000	Can be zipped onto the protection vest. Part of the VOSS (Enhanced Operational Soldier System) project. Base in NFP-Multitone camouflage, with rain covers in NFP-Tan or NFP-Green available.
37-liter backpack		Netherlands	Tactical backpack	7,000	Part of the VOSS (Enhanced Operational Soldier System) project. Base in NFP-Multitone camouflage, with rain covers in NFP-Tan or NFP-Green available.
55-liter backpack	Without the side pouch = 55 liters	Netherlands	Heavy backpack	–	Base in NFP-Multitone camouflage, with rain covers in NFP-Tan or NFP-Green available.
80-liter backpack	With the side pouches = 80 liters	Netherlands	Heavy backpack	–	Base in NFP-Multitone camouflage, with rain covers in NFP-Tan or NFP-Green available.
Set of pouches for equipment		Netherlands	Pouches	7,000	Part of the VOSS (Enhanced Operational Soldier System) project. NFP-Multitone camouflage.

== Weapons ==
=== Pistols ===
Model	Image	Origin	Type	Calibre	Notes
Glock 17 Gen4		Austria	Semi-automatic pistol	9×19mm Parabellum	The Glock 17 is the standard service pistol of all army units. The Glock 17 has been in use within the Netherlands Armed Forces since 1994 as the standard issue firearm. The current version in use is the Glock 17 Gen4.

=== Infantry Rifles ===
Model	Image	Origin	Type	Calibre	Notes
Colt Canada C7NLD		Canada	Assault rifle	5.56×45mm NATO	Standard service rifle and carbine. Modernized versions of the Diemaco C7 rifle and C8 carbine. Since 2009, both the C7s and C8s were modified to meet the latest requirements. All 25,000 rifles have been equipped with an Aimpoint CompM4 optic, a telescopic stock, a modified fire regulator, a laser-light module and a rail system. A new tan coating has also been applied. The modernized versions are called C7NLD and C8NLD. They also received a Brügger & Thomet grip with extendable bipod for a more stable prone shooting position.
Colt Canada C8NLD		Canada	Carbine	5.56×45mm NATO	
HK416A5		Germany	Carbine	5.56×45mm NATO	Standard service carbine of the Korps Commandotroepen, the Pathfinder Platoon of 11 Air Assault Brigade and engineer divers.
SIG MCX		United States	Carbine (Virtus)	.300 AAC Blackout	In use with the Korps Commandotroepen since 2022, in the Virtus en Rattler variants. Using subsonic .300 BLK munition, the unit regains its subsonic capability which was lost with the retirement of the FN P90 from Dutch service.
SIG MCX		United States	Personal defense weapon (Rattler)	.300 AAC Blackout	In use with the Korps Commandotroepen since 2022, in the Virtus en Rattler variants. Using subsonic .300 BLK munition, the unit regains its subsonic capability which was lost with the retirement of the FN P90 from Dutch service.

=== Machine guns ===
Model	Image	Origin	Type	Calibre	Notes
FN Minimi		Belgium	Light machine gun	5.56×45mm NATO	Standard light machine gun.
FN MAG		Belgium	General-purpose machine gun	7.62×51mm NATO	Standard general-purpose machine gun.
M2HB-QCB		United States	Heavy machine gun	12.7×99mm NATO	Standard heavy machine gun.

=== Precision rifles ===
Model	Image	Origin	Type	Calibre	Notes
Heckler & Koch HK417		Germany	Designated marksman rifle	7.62×51mm NATO	Designated marksman rifle in use with the Korps Commandotroepen and infantry sniper groups.
Accuracy International AWM		United Kingdom	Bolt action sniper rifle	7.62×51mm NATO / 8.6×70mm	In the process of being replaced by Accuracy AX rifles
Accuracy International AX		United Kingdom	Bolt action sniper rifle	7.62×51mm NATO / 8.6×70mm	Gradually replacing the Accuracy AWM rifles. The .308 Winchester caliber is exclusively used by snipers of the Korps Commandotroepen.
Barrett M107A1		United States	Anti-materiel rifle	12.7×99mm NATO	Anti-material rifle in use with sniper groups throughout the army. Fitted with a Schmidt & Bender 5-25x56 PMII LP scope.

=== Shotguns ===
Model	Image	Origin	Type	Calibre	Notes
Mossberg M590A1		United States	Pump action shotgun	12 gauge	Used for jungle warfare and door breaching.

=== Grenades ===
Model	Image	Origin	Type	Notes
RUAG HG85 "Nr. 300/Nr. 330"		Switzerland	Hand grenade	Nr. 300 is the Dutch designation for the HG 85 grenade.

=== Grenade launchers ===
Model	Image	Origin	Type	Calibre	Notes
Heckler & Koch AGW		Germany	Automatic grenade launcher	40×53mm HV	Automatic grenade launcher in use throughout the army. Both man-portable and vehicle-fitted versions in use.
Heckler & Koch UGL		Germany	Grenade launcher	40×46mm LV	Mounted under C7 rifles and C8 carbines.
M320 Grenade Launcher Module		United States Germany	Grenade launcher	40×46mm LV	In use with special forces of the Korps Commandotroepen.

=== Anti-tank weapons ===
Model	Image	Origin	Type	Diameter	Notes
M72A3 LAW		Norway	Anti-tank rocket launcher	66 mm	Exclusively used by the Korps Commandotroepen due to its low weight and compact handling of the weapon, used to great effect against improvised armored vehicles and fighting positions during the Dutch presence in Afghanistan.
Panzerfaust 3		Germany	Rocket propelled grenade	110 mm warhead	Equipped with Dynarange system, allows targets to be engaged during all weather conditions, speed and day/night conditions at a maximum range of 900 meters. Can also be used to target hovering helicopters. New procurement in 2020.
Spike MR		Israel Germany (licence)	Anti-tank guided missile	152 mm	Previously known as "GILL" in the Dutch Army. Selected in June 2001, ordered in August 2001: 297 launchers, 2,400 missiles to Euromissile GmbH and Thales Nederlands for USD $150 million. First delivery in 2004. Range: 200 to 2,000 m (220 to 2,190 yd)
Spike LR		Israel Germany (licence)	Anti-tank guided missile	152 mm	Used by reconnaissance forces (transported by the Luchtmobiel Speciaal Voertuig and the Fennek reconnaissance vehicle), using the same CLU launch unit as for the Spike MR. 84 missiles received in 2017 and 2018. Range: 200 to 4,000 m (220 to 4,370 yd)
Spike LR2		Israel Germany (licence)	Anti-tank guided missile	152 mm	Approved by the parliament in September 2024, to be ordered in October 2024 and enter service in 2026. They will replace the Spike MR, and also equip the modernised CV90. A new launch unit iCLU will also be ordered. Range: 200 to 5,500 m (220 to 6,010 yd), and NLOS capabilities.

=== Weapons accessories ===
Model	Image	Origin	Type	Quantity	Notes
Aimpoint 3×	—	Sweden	Day telescopic sight	—	Used by the regular infantry with the Colt C7/C8.
Schmidt & Bender 3-12×50		Germany	Day telescopic sight	—	Used with the HK417 DMR and the Accuracy International AX.
Schmidt&Bender 5-25×56 PMII LP		Germany	Day telescopic sight	—	
Thales MUNOS WS-4 Multiple Use Night Observation System Weapon Sight-4	—	Netherlands	Night sight	—	Used by the regular infantry with the Colt C7/C8.
Knights AN/PVS26 LRLP	—	United States	Night sight (passive residual light amplifier in front of telescopic sight)	—	Used with the Accuracy International AX.
FLIR Sniper	—	United States	Night sight	—	Used with the Barrett M107A1.
Aimpoint CompM2		Sweden	Non-magnified red dot	—	Used with the HK417 DMR.
Aimpoint CompM4		Sweden	Non-magnified red dot	—	Used by the regular infantry with the Colt C7/C8.
Rheinmetall LMD Laser module double beam	—	United States	IR Laser sight	—	Used by the regular infantry with the Colt C7/C8.
Rheinmetall VarioRay LLM Laser light module		Germany	Laser sightTactical light	—	Used by the KCT with the Colt C7/C8 and HK416A5.
Brügger&Thomet handle/ tripod		Switzerland	Vertical handle / tripod	—	Used by the regular infantry with the Colt C7/C8.

== Electronic and optical equipment ==
=== Night vision ===
Model	Image	Origin	Type	Number	Notes
XACT 32 NV Micro night vision monocular		Israel	Night vision goggles	4,300	

=== Observation and targeting equipment ===
Model	Image	Origin	Type	Quantity	Notes
Swarovski	—	Austria	Spotting scope	—	
Leica vector 21B		Switzerland	Binocular / rangefinder / compass / Digital Advances GPS Receiver	—	
Safran MOSKITO TI™		Switzerland	Multifunction IR goggles (laser range finder, laser pointer, compass, inclinometers)	980	Moskito ordered by the Dutch Armed Forces: 980 for the Army; 22 for the Air Force; 236 for the Navy / Marine Corps; 28 for the Marechaussée
Safran JIM Compact		Switzerland	Multifunction IR goggles (laser range finder, laser pointer, compass, inclinometers)	—	Artillery targeting system
Safran STERNA		Switzerland	Goniometer	—	Artillery targeting system
Thales LF28A		France	Laser target designator	—	JTAC equipped with: Thales LF28A; Infrared pointer Izlid 1000P; Leica vector 21B binoculars; GETAC laptop; AN/PRC 117 Radio (communications with pilot and satellite); AN/PRC 152 Radio (encrypted communications between JTAC and pilot)

== Combat Vehicles ==
=== Main battle tanks ===
Model	Image	Origin	Type	Quantity	Notes
Leopard 2A6MA2		Germany	MBT Main battle tank	18	The tanks are part of the 4th company of the German-Dutch 414 Tank Battalion, which is part of the Dutch 43rd Mechanised Brigade and are leased from Germany. The 18 tanks have been modernised and are equipped with Dutch communications and information systems. These modifications enable digital communications with Dutch units.

=== Infantry fighting vehicles ===
Model	Image	Origin	Type	Quantity	Notes
CV9035NL Mk IIIC		Sweden Netherlands	IFV Infantry fighting vehicle	128	192 CV9035 MkIII (184 IFV, 8 instruction vehicles) ordered in December 2004, entered service from 2008. 44 were sold to Estonia in 2014 (148 left, of which 136 used in service before modernisation). MLU of 128 vehicles to the standard MkIIIC (delivery by 2027): 122 ordered in 2021 with an option to modernise 19 additional vehicles; 6 instruction vehicles for modernisation; MLU taking place at Van Halteren Technologies in the Netherlands. The main modernisation includes: New BAE D-Series turret; Elbit Iron Fist Light Kinetic (IFLK) active protection system; ATGM Spike LR2 launcher; New drive elements (modernised active suspension VCS G4, rubber tracks); Of the 20 CV90 not modernised, 15 chassis are to be used for the Mjölner mortar carrier.
CV9035NL Mk IIIC		Sweden Netherlands	Instruction vehicles	8	

=== Armoured fighting vehicles ===
Model	Image	Origin	Type	Quantity	Notes
Boxer		Germany; Netherlands	Multi role armoured vehicle	200 (+140 on order)	Produced by ARTEC (JV between KNDS Deutschland and Rheinmetall Netherlands). Operational since 2014, inititally 200 vehicles ordered in five variants: 36 command posts; 52 ambulances; 92 engineering troops vehicles; 12 cargo vehicles; 8 driver training vehicle; 106 additional Boxer RCT30 (infantry fighting vehicle) on order; 34 additional Boxer Schakal (Boxer RCT30) on order as of October 2026
Bushmaster		Australia	Infantry mobility vehicle, MRAP; Mine-resistant ambush protected	102	Initially purchased as an emergency protection measure against the IED threat during the ISAF deployment Task Force Uruzgan. Multiple variants adopted and/or developed throughout the years: General service; Command posts; Driver training vehicle; Maintenance diagnosis and recovery; Multirole EOV "Knifefish" (electronic warfare); Casualty evacuation; Engineering vehicle; Explosive ordinance disposal; Mid-life upgrade, of all 102 vehicles, the modernised vehicles to enter service between 2024 and 2027. In April 2026, the Australian government announced that the Netherlands will acquire an undisclosed number (much less than 300) of additional Bushmasters.
Manticore		Italy	Infantry mobility vehicle, MRAP; Mine-resistant ambush protected	200 (delivered as of October 2024, total 1185 on order)	New vehicle designed for the Netherlands Armed Forces, replacement for the MB 290GD Wolf among others. First order placed in 2019, current order stands at 1185 vehicles of which the majority for the Army. The variants selected include: Hard-top (combat variant); Soft-top (combat variant); Pick-up (logistics variant); Casualty Transport (CAST, ambulance variant); MP/AFSV (Military Police/Air Force Security Vehicle); The order includes 130 RCWS FN deFNder^{®} Light equipped with the FN MAG.
Fennek		Netherlands; Germany	Reconnaissance vehicle	345	367 purchased originally. After modernisation, 345 vehicles will remain in service: 146 LVB (light reconnaissance); 47 FST (fire support team); 18 SWP (Stinger weapon platform SHORAD)After modernisation: 44 AD (general service); 46 LRAT (long-range anti-tank with Spike LR2); 4 AD VCP (forward command post); 36 AD mortar (81mm mortar transporter); 10 DTV (driver training vehicle); 2 OLM (not operational, education for maintenance); The fleet is undergoing a mid-life update which includes the provision of a Driver Night Vision System, modified weapon mounts with smoke launchers, LAZ400 thermal image systems, extendable mast with a new BAAIINL camera and Saab's Barracuda mobile camouflage system.
TPz Fuchs		Germany	Electronic warfare vehicle CBRN reconnaissance vehicle	16	Multiple versions in use. 9 EW vehicles, 6 NBC vehicles and 1 driver training vehicle: Electronic warfare (EW): Fuchs "EOV Sensorstation": Sensor station that intercepts radio and other data signals from a large area with a 19-meter high antenna mast.; Fuchs "EOV Peilstation": Communications reconnaissance system with enemy transmitter locating system.; Fuchs "EOV Stoorstation": Communications jamming station.; Fuchs "NBC": CBRN reconnaissance vehicles.; Fuchs driver training vehicle

=== Light tactical vehicles ===
Model	Image	Origin	Type	Quantity	Notes
Defenture VECTOR		Netherlands	Special operations vehicle	116	Developed for and in cooperation with the special operations forces of the Korps Commandotroepen by Dutch manufacturer DEfenture, currently part of a joint NLD SOCOM pool. 75 in first batch, additional 41 vehicles ordered on 19 December 2022, for use by the Rangers of 11 Air Assault Brigade for SOF support purposes.
Rheinmetall Caracal		Germany; Netherlands	Military light utility vehicle	Few (total 504 on order)	504 ordered in 2023 for 11 Air Assault Brigade, with an option for a total of 1,004 vehicles. First joined order with the German Army, total 1508 vehicles for €870 million. The Dutch variant is assembled by VDL Special Vehicles in Eindhoven. The first delivery took place in October 2026.
Mercedes-Benz G280 CDI		Germany; Austria	Military light utility vehicle	140	Vehicles were in use with the Korps Commandotroepen (KCT), additional vehicles formerly in use with the Netherlands Marine Corps were added to the Army fleet in 2019. All vehicles have been transferred to conventional infantry battalions. Currently, the G280 CDIs are used by 13th Light Brigade and 11th Airmobile Brigade.
Polaris MRZR D4		United States	Side-by-side	–	Unspecified number of vehicles in use with Korps Commandotroepen (KCT) and the 11 Brigade Reconnaissance Squadron of 11th Airmobile Brigade.

=== Miscellaneous Vehicles ===
Model	Image	Origin	Type	Quantity	Notes
Mercedes-Benz G-Class G350d (W464)		Germany Austria	Military ambulance	120	Interim ambulance, delivery started in December 2025. They will start entering service around the end of March or begin April 2026.
Volkswagen Amarok		Germany	Pick-up	1,667	All ordered vehicles in service since 2018 and used by the armed forces. This includes: 1,389 with hardtop; 144 with a tarpaulin; 134 with a cargo bed
Mercedes-Benz G290GD Wolf		Germany Austria	Utility vehicle	~1,700	Various versions in service. Partially replaced by 1527 Volkswagen Amarok, remaining vehicles to be replaced by 1185 Iveco MTVs from 2022 onwards.
Toyota Land Cruiser		Japan	Utility vehicle VIP Transport	~120	Used by the 11 Air Assault Brigade.
Luchtmobiel Speciaal Voertuig		Netherlands	All-terrain vehicle	122	Used by Air Mobile brigade, will be replaced by 515 Mercedes-Benz G300 CDI Air Assault (AASLT) vehicles.
Defenture MDQ		Netherlands	All-terrain vehicle	~275 on order	Diesel ATV produced for the armed forces by Dutch manufacturer Defenture. Users will be Korps Commandotroepen, Netherlands Marine Corps and 11 Air Assault Brigade. The contract includes an option for an additional 120 vehicles. Deliveries are planned for 2023 and 2024.
Suzuki King Quad 750 AXI 4×4		Japan	All-terrain vehicle	~50	Quad for Korps Commandotroepen and deployed conventional infantry.
KTM LC4		Austria	Motorcycle	~100	Used by 11 Air Assault Brigade.
KTM 350 EXC-F		Austria	Motorcycle	~100	Entering service since 2020 with 11 Air Assault Brigade, will replace some of the KTM LC-4s.
Milrem THeMIS		Estonia	Unmanned ground vehicle	6	Two vehicles of the Cargo variant, which can be optionally equipped with an FN deFNder remote weapon station, and four Combat variants which are equipped with an EOS R400 remote weapon station.

== Artillery ==
=== Rocket artillery ===
Model	Image	Origin	Type	Calibres	Quantity	Notes
PULS		Israel	Multiple rocket launcher	122 mm 160 mm 306 mm 330 mm 370 mm	4 (delivered as of February 2024, total 20 on order)	20 ordered in 2023. In February 2024 the first PULS multiple rocket launcher arrived in the Netherlands. Serial production is planned for 2025–26 and these systems will be installed on the Scania XT Gryphus 8×8 trucks from the start. First system mounted on Tatra 815-7 6×6.

=== Howitzers ===
Model	Image	Origin	Type	Calibre	Quantity	Notes
Pantserhouwitser 2000NL		Germany	Self-propelled howitzer	155 mm L/52	46	57 originally ordered of which 46 will be upgraded in joint project with Germany, 8 were transferred to Ukraine in 2022. Suited to fire the 155mm GPS-guided Excalibur grenade, 3,500 shells ordered initially, + 1999 ordered in 2021 Barracuda camouflage systems ordered in 2026 for the PzH 2000. Upgrades: Cope cage from COBBS Industries to be added as per a contract from November 2025
25-pounder		United Kingdom	Gun-howitzer	87.6 mm	8	Only used for ceremonial gun salutes.

=== Mortars ===
Model	Image	Origin	Type	Calibre	Quantity	Notes
Hirtenberger M6 C-640 Mk.1		Austria	Infantry mortar	60 mm	155	New 60 mm mortars in service with infantry battalions since 2019.
Hirtenberger M8 R-1365		Austria	Mortar	81mm	122	122 new Hirtenberger M8 mortars entering service from 2023 onwards, replacing the L16A2 mortars.
L16A2		United Kingdom	Mortar	81mm	63	Being replaced by 122 new 81 mm mortars.
MO-120-HB		France	Heavy towed mortar	120mm	22	120 mm mortar produced by Hotchkiss-Brandt (HB) to be replaced by new 120 mm mortars with loitering munitions from 2026 onwards for the 11th Airmobile Brigade and the Netherlands Marine Corps.

== Engineering vehicles ==
=== Recovery vehicles ===
Model	Image	Origin	Type	Quantity	Notes
Bergepanzer Büffel 3		West Germany Germany	ARV Armoured recovery vehicle	25	Based on the Leopard 2. Undergoing modernisation starting in 2019. First updated vehicles were delivered in 2022, process to be completed by 2027.
DAF YBB-95.480		Netherlands	Recovery truck	5	5 recovery trucks delivered in 2010, ordered to tow vehicles in a heavier weight class and for deployment in combat zones. To be replaced by 90 new recovery trucks.
DAF YBZ-3300		Netherlands	Recovery truck	~250	255 delivered in the early '90s. To be replaced by 90 new recovery trucks.
Liebherr G-LTM 1090-4.2		Germany Switzerland	Armoured mobile crane	4	

=== Armoured combat engineering vehicles ===
Model	Image	Origin	Type	Quantity	Notes
AEV 3 Kodiak		Germany Switzerland	AEV Armoured engineering vehicle	10	All operational since May 2018. In use with the armoured engineer battalions.
YPR-765		Netherlands	Sapper vehicle	~60	Largely replaced by CV90, Manticore and Boxer vehicles. The YPR PRBR (Pantser Rups Battle Damage Repair) and transport is still in use with the 43rd Mechanised Brigade. Several hundreds of reserve YPRs were donated to Ukraine.

=== Bridging equipment ===
Model	Image	Origin	Type	Quantity	Notes
Leopard 2 Panzerschnellbrücke "Leguan"		Germany	AVLB Armoured vehicle-launched bridge	8	8 Leopard 2 armoured vehicle-launched bridge (Leguan), MLC-80.
GDELS IRB Improved Ribbon Bridge		Germany	Foldable pontoon bridge	3 (3 IRB systems, 225 meters)	Ordered in June 2023. 3 systems purchased for up to 225 meters length. Deliveries: First in November 2024; Completion planned for June 2026; The system is made of: extremities landing pontoons; middle pontoon sections; boats to move the pontoon
WFEL Medium Girder Bridge (short span)		United Kingdom	Military bridge	–	9 meters long bridge, hand assembled.
WFEL Medium Girder Bridge		United Kingdom	Military bridge	–	
GDELS MAMBA		Germany	Pedestrian military bridge	–	
MLC-70 wegenmatsysteem		Netherlands Germany	Access mat	10	Used to lay roads.

=== Construction equipment ===
Model	Image	Origin	Type	Quantity	Notes
Caterpillar D6T		United States	Bulldozer	8	
Volvo EC220D		Sweden	Crawler excavator	7	
JCB 4CX-M		United Kingdom United States	Backhoe loader	13	11th Airmobile Brigade
Cat 930M		United States	Wheel loader	43	
Tobroco-Giant G2200 X-TRA HD+	—	Netherlands	Wheel loader	8 (+18 option)	Small ones for the logistics centers, military training area all-around duties, etc.
Tobroco-Giant G2700 X-TRA HD+	—	Netherlands	Wheel loader	8 (+18 option)	Small ones for the logistics centers, military training area all-around duties, etc.
Tobroco-Giant G3500 X-TRA	—	Netherlands	Wheel loader	8 (+18 option)	Small ones for the logistics centers, military training area all-around duties, etc.

=== Demining / explosive ordnance disposal ===
Model	Image	Origin	Type	Quantity	Notes
Božena-4 Božena-5		Slovakia	Demining robot skid steer	–	
tEODor		Germany	Large explosive ordinance disposal robot	–	Made by Telerob
TeleMAX		Germany	Medium explosive ordinance disposal robot	–	Made by Telerob
Dragon Runner		United States	Small explosive ordinance disposal robot	–	

=== Miscellaneous equipment ===
Model	Image	Origin	Type	Quantity	Notes
MAN SX 2000 - Brunnenbohrgerät U3V		Germany	Well drill	–	
IFFS BV - Iveco Eurocargo 4×4	—	Italy	Fire engine	1	Spraying vehicle Primarily used at the Reek bomb range, where explosives are used by the ministry of defence.
Brinkmann & Niemeijer		Netherlands	Electric generator	500	20 kVA Perkins BNMRP20-5G3 equipped on trucks, to supply the containers with energy
Brinkmann & Niemeijer		Netherlands	Electric generator	–	

== Logistics vehicles ==
=== Trucks and vans ===
Model	Image	Origin	Type	Quantity	Notes
Transport vehicles
DAF XF semi-trailer truck		Netherlands	Semi truck	104	112 semi-trailer trucks (165 kN DAF XF-trucks and 450 kN/600 kN Broshuis-trailers) operational since 2005.
DAF YA 4440/4442		Netherlands	Truck	1,200	Various versions, to be partially replaced by additional Scania XT "Gryphus" from 2019 onwards. Over 1000 vehicles transferred to Ukraine.
Iveco Stralis		Italy	Truck	—	Used in several variants, Semi truck 4×2 and 6×2; Iveco Stralis 450 (transport truck with trailers 6×4)
Scania PLS trucks		Sweden	Tactical truck	552	Various versions in service since 2005.
Scania Gryphus 50kN 5 tons		Sweden	Tactical truck	2,245	Based on the Scania XT truck, a total of 2,571 vehicles purchased by the armed forces. The detailed list of users is: Army: 2,245; Air Force: 191; Marine Corps / Navy: 73; Marechaussee: 2; Defence interservice command: 15; Other: 20; Progressive replacement of the DAF YA 4440/4442, YA/YT-2300. The first entered service in 2019. Maintenance of these trucks will be performed at State Owned Workshops (SOW) and Scania workshops.
Scania Gryphus 100kN - 6×6 Low Operational (Scania XT) 10 tons		Sweden	Tactical truck	2,245	Based on the Scania XT truck, a total of 2,571 vehicles purchased by the armed forces. The detailed list of users is: Army: 2,245; Air Force: 191; Marine Corps / Navy: 73; Marechaussee: 2; Defence interservice command: 15; Other: 20; Progressive replacement of the DAF YA 4440/4442, YA/YT-2300. The first entered service in 2019. Maintenance of these trucks will be performed at State Owned Workshops (SOW) and Scania workshops.
Scania Gryphus 100kN - 8×8 High Operational (Scania XT) 10 tons		Sweden	Tactical truck	2,245	Based on the Scania XT truck, a total of 2,571 vehicles purchased by the armed forces. The detailed list of users is: Army: 2,245; Air Force: 191; Marine Corps / Navy: 73; Marechaussee: 2; Defence interservice command: 15; Other: 20; Progressive replacement of the DAF YA 4440/4442, YA/YT-2300. The first entered service in 2019. Maintenance of these trucks will be performed at State Owned Workshops (SOW) and Scania workshops.
Scania Gryphus 150kN (Scania XT) 15 tons		Sweden	Tactical semi-truck	2,245	Based on the Scania XT truck, a total of 2,571 vehicles purchased by the armed forces. The detailed list of users is: Army: 2,245; Air Force: 191; Marine Corps / Navy: 73; Marechaussee: 2; Defence interservice command: 15; Other: 20; Progressive replacement of the DAF YA 4440/4442, YA/YT-2300. The first entered service in 2019. Maintenance of these trucks will be performed at State Owned Workshops (SOW) and Scania workshops.
Tatra Phoenix PR3333 6×6	Illustration	Czech Republic	Hooklift truck with trailer	4	Also additional purchased for the Royal Marechaussee.
MAN TGX - Hydrogen ICE 6×4		Germany Austria	Hydrogen ICE semi-truck	3	General cargo / fuel transport in the Netherlands.
Vans
MAN TGE 5.160		Germany	EOD van	15	In service since the end of 2024, variant selected extra-long and extra high (L4 / H4).

=== Trailers ===
Model	Image	Origin	Type	Quantity	Notes
Broshuis 7-axle 650kN trailer (Tropco)		Netherlands	Low loader trailer	39	
Broshuis 4-axle 400kN trailer (Tropco)		Netherlands	Low loader semi-trailer	63	
Broshuis 8-axle PL2 pendular axle semi low loaders		Netherlands	Low loader semi-trailer, heavy transporter	39	Purchased in March 2025, designed to transport the Leopard 2A8.
Broshuis Medium Equipment Transporters low loaders		Netherlands	Low loader semi-trailer, medium transporter	40	Purchased in March 2025.
Broshuis semi low loaders		Netherlands	Semi-low loaders	18	Purchased in March 2025.
Broshuis flat trailers	—	Netherlands	Flat trailer	11	Purchased in March 2025.
Broshuis 4-axle drawbar trailers	—	Netherlands	Drawbar trailer	38	Purchased in March 2025.

=== Handling equipment ===
Model	Image	Origin	Type	Quantity	Notes
Cranes
Liebherr LTM 1055-3.2		Germany Switzerland	Mobile crane	8	Succeeds to Liebherr FKM and Liebherr KTM.
Van Bouwel Spidercrane	(illustration)	Netherlands	Light mobile crane	7	
Material handling vehicles
Liftking LK30P-NL		Canada	Heavy rough-terrain forklift	68	
Bobcat TL25.60		United States	Telehandler	71	
Bobcat TL35.105L		United States	Telehandler	71	

== Electronic equipment ==
=== Communications equipment ===
Model	Image	Origin	Type	Quantity	Notes
Communication systems
Thales PR4G - FM9000	—	France	VHF Radio	10,000 (estimate)	All delivered by 2001.
Elbit E-Lynx		Israel	Tactical radio	—	
Command and control systems
Elbit Raptor C2	—	Israel	Command system	—	

=== Ground surveillance radars ===
Model	Image	Origin	Type	Quantity	Notes
Thales Squire Block II		Netherlands	Man-portable ground surveillance radar	51	Range for tracked vehicles: ≤ 48 km (30 mi). Orders: 62 ordered in 2002 for the Royal Netherlands Army and the Royal Netherlands Marine Corps; 21 Squire Block III ordered in October 2024; Modernisation: 60 modernised to the Block II from 2018 onwards. Radar sold: 9 Squire Block II sold to Belgium in 2018. 72 remain in service with the Royal Netherlands Army and the Royal Netherlands Marine Corps.
Thales Squire Block III		Netherlands	Man-portable ground surveillance radar	21	Range for tracked vehicles: ≤ 48 km (30 mi). Orders: 62 ordered in 2002 for the Royal Netherlands Army and the Royal Netherlands Marine Corps; 21 Squire Block III ordered in October 2024; Modernisation: 60 modernised to the Block II from 2018 onwards. Radar sold: 9 Squire Block II sold to Belgium in 2018. 72 remain in service with the Royal Netherlands Army and the Royal Netherlands Marine Corps.

== Air defence ==
=== Air defence systems ===
Model	Image	Origin	Type	Range / Altitude	Quantity	Notes
Anti-drone systems
Elbit Systems ReDrone	—	Israel	Counter UAS system	—	—	System made off: Vehicle; DAiR radar; SIGINT sensors; COAPS-L electro-optical system; Electronic attack capabilities; Command and control system
SHORAD
FIM-92 Stinger		United States	MANPADS Man-portable air-defense system	4.8 km (3.0 mi) / 3.8 km (2.4 mi)	—	Operated across various army units. Among the ones purchased, 200 were donated to Ukraine in February 2022 amid the 2022 Russian invasion of Ukraine.
FIM-92K Stinger Block I		United States Germany	MANPADS Man-portable air-defense system	4.8 km (3.0 mi) / 3.8 km (2.4 mi)	—	Common purchase with Italy and Germany through NATO Support and Procurement Agency (NSPA). Sale approved by the DSCA in January 2024. The order of 940 missiles was signed in July 2024, 506 are planned for Germany. Diehl will co-produce with Raytheon.
Fennek SWP Stinger Weapon Platform		Germany Netherlands Turkey	Very short-range air defence	4.8 km (3.0 mi) / 3.8 km (2.4 mi)	18	Fennek converted to the SWP variant in 2007. Operated by 13th Air Defence Battery. System equipped with 4 ready-to-fire missiles. The launchers are mounted on the Pedestal Mounted Air Defence System. System to be replaced by: Skyranger 30, based on ACSV G5 (30 mm gun and Stinger missile); NOMADS, based on ACSV G5, armed with the AIM-9X II Sidewinder missiles (15 km (9.3 mi) range)
NASAMS II
NASAMS II		Norway United States	Medium-range surface-to-air fire unit	30 km (19 mi) / 15 km (9.3 mi)	2 (2 fire units)	System acquired in 2006. Operated by 13th Air Defence Battery, and it is part of the AGBADS. The Netherlands Army has 2 NASAMS-2 systems in service, each composed of: 1 SFC (SHORAD fire control); 1 AN/MPQ-64M2 Sentinel; 3 launchers firing each 6 AIM-120B AMRAAM (initial 100 AIM-120B missiles ordered in 2006); Note: NASAMS-3 on order.
NASAMS launchers Mk2		Norway	Missile launcher	–	6 (6 launchers, 3 per fire unit)	System acquired in 2006. Operated by 13th Air Defence Battery, and it is part of the AGBADS. The Netherlands Army has 2 NASAMS-2 systems in service, each composed of: 1 SFC (SHORAD fire control); 1 AN/MPQ-64M2 Sentinel; 3 launchers firing each 6 AIM-120B AMRAAM (initial 100 AIM-120B missiles ordered in 2006); Note: NASAMS-3 on order.
MPQ-64M2 Sentinel		United States	X-band, electronically steered, pulse-Doppler, 3D radar	120 km (75 mi)	2 (2 radars, 1 per fire unit)	System acquired in 2006. Operated by 13th Air Defence Battery, and it is part of the AGBADS. The Netherlands Army has 2 NASAMS-2 systems in service, each composed of: 1 SFC (SHORAD fire control); 1 AN/MPQ-64M2 Sentinel; 3 launchers firing each 6 AIM-120B AMRAAM (initial 100 AIM-120B missiles ordered in 2006); Note: NASAMS-3 on order.
Kongsberg SFC SHORAD fire control		Norway	Command and control system	–	2 (2 command centers, 1 per fire unit)	System acquired in 2006. Operated by 13th Air Defence Battery, and it is part of the AGBADS. The Netherlands Army has 2 NASAMS-2 systems in service, each composed of: 1 SFC (SHORAD fire control); 1 AN/MPQ-64M2 Sentinel; 3 launchers firing each 6 AIM-120B AMRAAM (initial 100 AIM-120B missiles ordered in 2006); Note: NASAMS-3 on order.
AIM-120B		United States	Anti-air missile	30 km (19 mi) / 15 km (9.3 mi)	–	System acquired in 2006. Operated by 13th Air Defence Battery, and it is part of the AGBADS. The Netherlands Army has 2 NASAMS-2 systems in service, each composed of: 1 SFC (SHORAD fire control); 1 AN/MPQ-64M2 Sentinel; 3 launchers firing each 6 AIM-120B AMRAAM (initial 100 AIM-120B missiles ordered in 2006); Note: NASAMS-3 on order.
MIM-104 Patriot
MIM-104 Patriot		United States	Medium-range surface-to-air fire unit		4 fire units (4×6 launchers)	Operated by 802 Squadron, upgraded to the latest US Army version with Patriot PAC-2 and PAC-3 MSE missiles.

=== Surveillance radars ===
Model	Image	Origin	Type	Quantity	Notes
TRML-3D/32		Germany	Early warning radar	5	Part of GBADS Phases 1 and 2, transported by the MAN 8×8 SX2000.
Thales Nederland GM 200 MM/C		Netherlands	Multi-mission 4D AESA radar	26	Radars installed on Scania Gyraphus (100kN 8×8 trucks) (100 kN 8×8 trucks), known as the MMR in the Netherlands Armed Forces. Orders: 9 (January 2019); 7 (April 2024), 2 in option; 2 (September 2024)from the option; 8 (October 2024); Deliveries: First in February 2024.; Note: the 26 radars ordered are in the GM200 MM/C variants, the use is: 14 - air and missile defence; 12 - counter-battery / C-UAS

=== Air defence organisation ===
Model	Image	Origin	Type	Quantity	Notes
AGBADS "Army Ground Based Air Defense System"	—	Netherlands Norway Germany	Medium-range surface-to-air missile	—	Combination of air defence systems composed on sub-systems that can be independent of each other.: 2 NASAMS-2; 18 Fennek SWP; 5 TRML-3D/32

== Unmanned aerial vehicles ==
Model	Image	Origin	Type	Role	Quantity	Notes
Black Hornet Nano		Norway	Micro-multicopter UAV Unmanned aerial vehicle	ISR Intelligence, surveillance, and reconnaissance	48	In use with Brigade Reconnaissance Squadrons and Korps Commandotroepen.
AeroVironment RQ-11B DDL Raven		United States	Fixed-wing mini-UAV Unmanned aerial vehicle	ISR Intelligence, surveillance, and reconnaissance	48	Replaced the Raven B NLD, acquired combinedly with the RQ-21, Wasp III and RQ-20.
AeroVironment RQ-20 Puma		United States	Fixed-wing low altitude UAV Unmanned aerial vehicle	ISR Intelligence, surveillance, and reconnaissance	12	Acquired combinedly with the RQ-21, RQ-11B DDL and Wasp III.
AeroVironment Wasp III		United States	Fixed-wing low altitude UAV Unmanned aerial vehicle	ISR Intelligence, surveillance, and reconnaissance	18	Acquired combinedly with the RQ-21, RQ-11B DDL and RQ-20.
Boeing Insitu RQ-21 Blackjack		United States	Fixed-wing low altitude UAV Unmanned aerial vehicle	ISR Intelligence, surveillance, and reconnaissance	15	5 systems in use, with 3 UAVs eachs. Operated by the Joint ISTAR Command.
Boeing Insitu ScanEagle		United States	Fixed-wing low altitude UAV Unmanned aerial vehicle	ISR Intelligence, surveillance, and reconnaissance	12	Gradually replaced by the RQ-21.
EOS C VTOL		Estonia	Fixed-wing, VTOL, low altitude UAV Vertical take-off and landing, unmanned aerial vehicle	ISR Intelligence, surveillance, and reconnaissance	—	

== Future equipment ==
=== Orders ===
==== Grenades ====
Model	Image	Origin	Type	Notes
Rheinmetall hand grenades (15 models)		Germany; Austria	Hand grenades	Framework agreement signed in January 2026, the production is to take place in Germany and Austria.

==== Anti-tank weapons ====
Model	Image	Origin	Type	Diameter	Notes
Carl Gustaf M4		Sweden	Recoilless rifles	84 mm	Successor to the Panzerfaust 3, ordered in May 2025, delivery in 2028.

==== Armoured vehicles ====
Model	Image	Origin	Type	Quantity	Notes
Leopard 2A8		Germany	MBT; Main battle tank	46 (+6 in option)	Delivery between 2028 and 2031. Option to be decided by 2027.
Leopard 2A8 DTV	—	Germany	Driver training vehicle	4	
Boxer RCT30 - Schakal		Germany; Netherlands	IFV; Infantry fighting vehicle	106	72 additional Boxer, with the RCT30 mission module (same as the Bundeswehr) ordered in October 2025. 150 purchased by Germany, common option for 248 additional vehicles. 34 additional were ordered in August 2026, as part of a common order of 69 for Germany and the Netherlands.
Mowag Piranha V - Sawfish		Switzerland; Germany; Netherlands	EW; Electronic warfare	N/A	Ordered at ILA 2026 in June 2026.
Patria 6×6		Finland	N/A	N/A	The Netherlands has signed the Technical Arrangement (TA) of the multinational Common Armoured Vehicle System (CAVS) programme.

==== Artillery ====
Model	Image	Origin	Type	Calibre	Quantity	Notes
CV90 Mjolner	Swedish Army Mjölner	Sweden	Mortar carrier	120 mm	15 on order	15 on order with dual-barrel 120mm mortar turret, delivery planned for 2028 based on Swedish Mjölner. The Dutch version will incorporate minor adjustments, such as C2 equipments, adding a machine gun to the turret and a heightened rear compartment to account for the height of the Dutch troops.

==== Vehicles ====
Model	Image	Origin	Type	Quantity	Notes
Iveco trucks	—	Italy	Swap loader systems	588	785 trucks ordered to Iveco Defence Vehicles, deliveries planned for 2027 - 2029. Recovery vehicles designed for offroad missions, and a majority will be armoured.
Iveco trucks	—	Italy	Tractor units	100	785 trucks ordered to Iveco Defence Vehicles, deliveries planned for 2027 - 2029. Recovery vehicles designed for offroad missions, and a majority will be armoured.
Iveco trucks	—	Italy	Recovery trucks	97	785 trucks ordered to Iveco Defence Vehicles, deliveries planned for 2027 - 2029. Recovery vehicles designed for offroad missions, and a majority will be armoured.

==== Communication equipment ====
Model	Image	Origin	Type	Quantity	Notes
L3 Harris AN/PRC-117G		United States	Backpack radio	—	20 watt radio, covering a waveband of 30 MHz (0.030 GHz) to 2,000 MHz (2.0 GHz). Selected in November 2023.
L3 Harris AN/PRC-160 HF	—	United States	Backpack radio	—	
L3 Harris AN/PRC-163		United States	Handheld radio	—	10 watt radio, covering a waveband of 30 MHz (0.030 GHz) to 2,600 MHz (2.6 GHz). Selected in November 2023.

==== Air defence ====
Model	Image	Origin	Vehicle	Type	Quantity	Notes
NASAMS-3		Norway	—	MRAD SAM; Medium range air-defence, surface-to-air missile	21	To be equipped with the AIM-120 AMRAAM-ER missiles.
NOMADS		Norway; Germany	ACSV G5	SHORAD; Short range air-defence	18	Successor of the Fennek, based on the ACSV G5 vehicle, the NASAMS command system, to be equipped with AIM-9X II Sidewinder missiles (15 km range). In November 2024, the Netherlands signed a contract for the delivery of: 18 NOMADS air defence systems; 6 command vehicles based on the ACSV G5; In September 2026, a contract was signed for a complementary order. To enter service by 2028.
NOMADS command		Norway; Germany	ACSV G5	SHORAD command vehicles Short range air-defence	5	As part of the NOMADS air defence system, the Netherlands will purchase 5 command vehicles based on the ACSV G5.
Skyranger 30		Switzerland; Germany; Netherlands	ACSV G5	SPAAG; Self-propelled anti-air gun	Unknown	Self-propelled anti-air gun based on ACSV G5 Contract signed in December 2025, it includes: Mobile Skyranger 30; Static Skyranger 30; Training simlators; 22 are expected to be of the mobile version. 3 to be made in Switzerland, the rest to be assembled in the Netherlands.
Robin Radar		Netherlands	—	UAV air surveillance	100	

=== Planned orders ===
==== Small arms ====
Model	Image	Origin	Type	Calibre	Notes
Future assault rifle	—	—	Assault rifle	5.56×45mm NATO	Replacement of the Colt Canada C7NLD / C8NLD for 2030, contract expected in 2026 or 2027.
Future assault rifle	—	—	Carabine	5.56×45mm NATO	Replacement of the Colt Canada C7NLD / C8NLD for 2030, contract expected in 2026 or 2027.

==== Vehicles ====
Model	Image	Origin	Type	Quantity	Notes
CV9035NL		Sweden Netherlands	IFV Infantry fighting vehicle	–	Additional to be purchased in cooperation with other nations.
TBD	TBD	TBD	Light airmobile troop transport vehicles (9 pax)	–	Vehicles needed for the 11 Luchtmobiele Brigade. Those are planned to be transported from under the CH-47F Chinook of the Royal Netherlands Air Force. They will complement the Rheinmetall Caracal. Potential vehicles: M1301 nfantry Squad Vehicle; Defenture GRF / Vector / Defenture MAMMOTH; Polaris DAGOR ULTV
TBD	TBD	TBD	Light airmobile troop transport vehicles (5 pax)	–	Vehicles needed for the 11 Luchtmobiele Brigade. Those are planned to be transported from under the CH-47F Chinook of the Royal Netherlands Air Force. They will complement the Rheinmetall Caracal. Potential vehicles: M1301 nfantry Squad Vehicle; Defenture GRF / Vector / Defenture MAMMOTH; Polaris DAGOR ULTV
Mowag Piranha V - Knifefish		Switzerland Germany Netherlands	Electronic wafare vehilce	>10	>10 Electronic Warfare (EW) vehicles to be ordered based on Boxer chassis in cooperation with Germany, Switzerland, and likely Denmark as part of the joint Knifefish project.
FFG ACSV G5		Germany	Support vehicle	440	Early on, the Dutch government informed the parliament of the interest to order 100 to 150 ACSV G5 as support vehicles for the 43rd Heavy Mechanised Brigade. As of March 2026, the number is expected to reach 440, it will include around 40 air defence systems (NOMADS / Skyranger 30).
WiSENT 2 ARV		Germany	ARV Armoured recovery vehicle	–	
WiSENT 2 AEV		Germany	AEV Armoured engineering vehicle	–	

==== Communication equipment ====
Model	Image	Origin	Type	Quantity	Notes
Foxtrot programme	—	Netherlands	Interoperable communication network	—	Equipment for connection in and between vehicles, weapon systems and vessels. The blocks included in the project are: MRBB block, made of the L3Harris radios already ordered; Platform IT Infrastructure building block; Laptops; C2Infra; Defence; Security gateways; Wi-Fi, 4G, 5G, and satellite communications; To equip: 8,000 vehicles; 3,500 military personnel; 135 vessels; 170 flying platforms
SOF C4I programme	—	Tactical command, control, communications, computers, and intelligence (C4I) network	—	—	

== See also ==
- List of equipment of the Royal Netherlands Marine Corps
- List of active Royal Netherlands Navy ships
- List of active aircraft of the Royal Netherlands Air Force
