= List of equipment of the Royal Netherlands Marine Corps =

This is a list of the equipment of the Royal Netherlands Marine Corps.

== Personal equipment ==
=== Camouflage ===
Model	Image	Origin	Pattern type	Environment / colours	Notes
M19 NFP-Multitone		Netherlands	Flecktarn	Universal	Standard camo used whenever possible and during training. Colour scheme used for carrying vest and backpack.
M19 NFP-Green		Netherlands	Flecktarn	Temperate / central-Europe / urban	Temperate alternative camo if the vegetation makes the multitone not ideal.
M19 NFP-Tan		Netherlands	Flecktarn	Arid / desert	Desert alternative camo when required by the mission.
M19 NFP-Blue		Netherlands	Flecktarn	Marine	Navy camo, used in a maritime environment.
M19 NFP-White	–	Netherlands	Flecktarn	Winter / snow	Snowy conditions, in development.

=== Protection equipment ===
Model	Image	Origin	Type	Quantity	Notes
Helmets
Galvion Batlskin Viper P6N		Canada	Combat Helmet	48,800	Standard issue helmet used by the Marines and the Army. 48,800 ordered in 2019.
Gentex Ops Core FAST		United States	Combat Helmet	–	In use with the NL MARSOF and the Marine Intervention Unit.
NBRC equipment
FM50	–	United Kingdom	CBRN mask	–	Made by Avon Protection.

== Small arms ==
Model	Image	Origin	Type	Calibre	Notes
Handguns
Glock 17 Gen4		Austria	Semi-automatic pistol	9×19mm Parabellum	Standard service pistol.
SIG Sauer P226		Switzerland	Semi-automatic pistol	9×19mm Parabellum	In use with the Marine Intervention Unit.
Heckler & Koch P11		Germany	Underwater pistol	7.62×36mm	In use with the NL MARSOF.
Assault rifles, carabines and battle rifles
Diemaco C7A1		Canada	Assault rifle	5.56×45mm NATO	Standard service rifle, equipped with a red dot sight 4.3× Elcan.
Diemaco C8A1		Canada	Carbine	5.56×45mm NATO	A certain number of carabines in service as well. In use with the NL MARSOF.
Heckler & Koch HK416A5		Germany	Carbine	5.56×45mm NATO	In use with the NL MARSOF and the Marine Intervention Unit. Equipped with, red dot sight 4.3× Elcan, laser light modules LLM01
SIG MCX		United States	Carbine	5.56×45mm NATO / 7.62×35 mm (.300 BLK)	195 in use with the NL MARSOF. Specificities: integrated suppressor
Submachine guns
Heckler & Koch MP5SD		Germany	Submachine gun	9×19mm Parabellum	In use with the Marine Intervention Unit
FN P90		Belgium	PDW	FN 5.7×28mm	Fitted with a suppressor, optics and a laser light module. In use with the Marine Intervention Unit for domestic counter-terrorism operations.
Heckler & Koch MP7		Germany	PDW	4.6×30mm HK	
Machine guns
FN Minimi Para		Belgium	LMG	5.56×45mm NATO	Standard infantry machine gun.
FN MAG		Belgium	GPMG	7.62×51mm NATO	Mounted on vehicles and boats.
M2 Browning QCB; Quick Change Barrel	–	Belgium; United States	HMG	12.7×99mm NATO	Mounted on tripods, vehicles and boats.
Precision rifles
Heckler & Koch HK417		Germany	DMR	7.62×51mm NATO	In use with the NL MARSOF and the Marine Intervention Unit. Accessories: Schmidt & Bender 3-12×50 telescopic sight; Aimpoint comp M2 red-dot with a 3× magnifier
Accuracy International AX		United Kingdom	Bolt action DMR	7.62×51mm NATO / 8.6×70mm (.338 Lapua Magnum)	AX308 in use with the NL MARSOF, the AX 338 in use with the marines. Accessories: Schmidt & Bender 3-12×50 telescopic sight (P4 reticle); Knights Armament AN/PVS-26 LRLP passive residual light amplifier
Barrett M107A1		United States	Anti materiel sniper rifle	12.7×99mm NATO	In use with the Marines and the NL MARSOF. Accessories: Schmidt & Bender 5-25×56 PMII LP telescopic sight (H37 reticle)
Shotgun
Mossberg 590		United States	Pump action shotgun	12-gauge	Breaching weapon.
Grenades and grenade launchers
RUAG HG 85; HG 85 Nr 330 C1 and Nr 331 C2 scherfhandgranaat		Switzerland	Fragmentation hand grenade	–	
M320 Grenade Launcher Module		United States	Under-barrel grenade launcher	40×46mm LV	Grenade launchers for the Colt C7A1.
Heckler & Koch UGL		Germany	Under-barrel grenade launcher	40×46mm LV	Grenade launchers for the HK416 A5 and the Colt C7A1.
Heckler & Koch GMG		Germany	AGL	40×53mm HV	
Anti-tank weapons
Panzerfaust 3		Germany	AGL	110mm	Standard Marine infantry AT weapon. Ammunitions: DM12A2 (HEAT-RA, "High Explosive Anti Tank – Rocket Assisted"); DM72 (HEAT-IT-RA, "High Explosive Anti Tank - Improved Tandem - Rocket Assisted"); DM32 (HEAT-MP-RA, "High Explosive Anti Tank - Multi Purpose - Rocket Assisted"); DM18A1 (TP-RA, "Training Practice - Rocket Assisted"); Accessories: Dynarange firing system
Spike MR; GILL		Israel; Germany; Netherlands	ATGM	152mm	Spike LR2 selected to replace Spike MR, to be ordered in October 2024.
Spike LR2		Israel; Germany	ATGM	152mm	Spike LR2 selected to replace Spike MR, to be ordered in October 2024.
Weapon stations
FN deFNder		Belgium	RCWS	7.62×51mm NATO	Installed on the Iveco MTV hard-top, equipped with the FN MAG.

== Indirect fire ==
Model	Image	Origin	Type	Calibre	Quantity	Notes
MO-120 RT		France	Towed mortar	120 mm	Unknown quantity for the marines	To be replaced by new 120 mm mortars with loitering munitions from 2026 onwards for the Royal Dutch Marines.
Hirtenberger		Austria	Mortar	81 mm	Unknown quantity for the marines	126 in total for the Marine Cops and the Army. Successor of the L16A2.
Hirtenberger M6 C-640 Mk.1		Austria	Infantry mortar	60 mm	Unknown quantity for the marines	

== Vehicles ==
Model	Image	Origin	Type	Quantity	Notes
Armoured vehicles
Iveco MTV; 12kN Manticore		Italy; Netherlands	IMV; MRAP	108	Variants: ST (soft top); CAST (casualty transport)
BvS10 Viking		Sweden	Tracked articulated armoured vehicle	15	73 purchased in the following variants: 45 armoured personnel carriers; 20 command vehicles; 4 repair and recovery / mobile workshops; 4 casualty transport vehicles; 2 × 28 of these vehicles were donated to Ukraine.
DMV 4×4 Anaconda Carib		Italy; Netherlands	Lightly armoured tactical vehicle	46	Vehicle based on the Iveco Daily, ordered to replace the Mercedes-Benz G280 CDI in the Caribbean and UNIMOG. It exists in 4 sub-variants: Command (no armament, communication equipment); Patrol (equipped with machine guns, limited communication equipment); Support (equipped with machine guns, no communication equipment); Driver training; Armament: M2 Browning on the roof; FN MAG on a pivot on the passenger side
Pool with the Dutch Army of armoured vehicles
Thales Bushmaster Protected Mobility Vehicle		Australia	IMV; MRAP	102 (total vehicle within pool)	APC can be operated by the Marines on missions abroad. In April 2026, the Australian government announced that the Netherlands will acquire an disclosed number of additional Bushmasters.
Defenture Vector SOF; Vector Off-Road Vehicle Special Operations Forces		Netherlands	Off-road vehicle (with optional armour)	75 (total vehicle pool for NLD SOCOM)	Operated by NL MARSOF, the successor of the Mercedes-Benz G280 CDI. The NL MARSOF has access to the fleet of 75 Defenture VECTOR special operations vehicles through a joint NLD SOCOM pool. Armament: FN MAG; M2 Browning QCB; Heckler & Koch GMG
Unarmoured vehicles
Bv206 NLD		Sweden	Tracked articulated vehicle	103	156 purchased in the 1980s, 99 modernised to the standard Bv206 NLD. Variants: personnel carrier; recovery and repair; transport; mortar platform; To be replaced, 124 planned to be ordered (FLATM BV programme).
DMV Anaconda AAT; Anti-Armour-Troop		Italy; Netherlands	Light tank destroyer	14	Vehicle based on the Iveco Daily, hard-top roof, ordered to replace the Land Rover serving with the Anti Armour Troop of the Royal Dutch Marines. Armament: M2 Browning on the roof; FN MAG on a pivot on the passenger side; Storage bay for 2 Panzerfaust 3 and 6 Spike MR "GILL" / Spike LR2.
VW Amarok		Germany	Utility vehicle	N/A	One of the successor of the Land Rover Defenders.
VW Amarok		Germany; Netherlands	All-terrain ambulance	7	Visser ambulance.
Land Rover Defender 110; Land Rover Defender 110XD WW		United Kingdom	Utility vehicle	98	Vehicle being replaced by the DMV Anaconda and the VW Amarok. Equipped with a ring mount for a machine gun.
Logistics vehicles
Scania Gryphus 4×4; 4×4 Low Operational 50 kN (5 tons)		Sweden	Unarmoured tactical truck	73	Modified with a tyre pressure system to enable beach landings. Equipped with a loading platform or a 10-foot container.
DMV - Iveco EuroCargo 150 E24 4×4		Italy; Netherlands	Unarmoured tactical truck	33	
DAF YA-4442 4×4- YAM; 4×4 40 kN		Netherlands	Unarmoured tactical truck	N/A	Version for the Marine Corps, equipped with cold-weather gear and increased wading capacity for amphibious landings. Being replaced by the Scania Gyraphus 4×4.
Scania P124 CB420 8×8 WLS; 8×8 165 kN - swap-load system		Netherlands	Tactical truck with hydraulic hooklift hoist	N/A	Add-on armour kits available, 555 vehicles purchased for the armed forces, unknown quantity assigned to the Marine.
Light vehicles
Suzuki King Quad 750 (4x4)		Japan	ATV	N/A	In use with the NL MARSOF.
Can-Am Outlander 6×6		Canada	ATV	N/A	
Can-Am BRP Lynx Snowmobile		Canada	Snowmobile	N/A	Armed with machine guns sleds.
Ski-Doo Expedition LE 900 ACE		Canada	Snowmobile	N/A	
Engineering vehicles
Leopard 1 BARV; Beach Armoured Recovery Vehicle		Germany; Norway	Beach armoured recovery vehicle	4	Name of the vehicles: Hercules; Samson; Goliath; Titan
Werklust WG18Edef loader + Class 30 Trackway		Netherlands; United Kingdom	Aluminium matting system on wheel loader	N/A	Class 30 trackway.
Scania WLS + Class 30 Trackway		Sweden; United Kingdom	Aluminium matting system	N/A	

== Electronic equipment ==
Model	Image	Origin	Type	Quantity	Notes
Communications
Elbit Systems E-LynX PNR-1000	–	Israel	Hand-held radio	N/A	Radio that equip dismounted troops, part of the Verbeterd Operationeel Soldaten Systeem (VOSS) of the Dutch military, purchased in 2020.
Night vision
Elbit Systems XACT nv32 micro	–	Israel	Night vision goggles	N/A	
L3Harris GPNVG-18	Illustration	United States	Night vision goggles (4th generation)	N/A	Used by the NL MARSOF.
Goggles
Safran Vectronix MOSKITO TI™		Switzerland	Multifunction IR goggles (laser range finder, laser pointer, compass, inclinometers)	N/A	

== Aviation ==
The Corps cooperates closely with the Defence Helicopter Command which provides airlift using NH90, CH-47 Chinook and AS532 Cougar transport helicopters.

== UAV ==
Model	Image	Origin	Type	Role	Quantity	Notes
AeroVironment RQ-20 Puma		United States	Fixed-wing mini-UAV	ISTAR	N/A	
AeroVironment RQ-11 Raven		United States	Fixed-wing mini-UAV	ISR	N/A	
Black Hornet Nano PD-100		Norway	Rotorcraft micro-UAV	ISR	N/A	In use with the NL MARSOF.

== Future equipment ==
Model	Image	Origin	Type	Quantity ordered	Notes
Kaaiman DXPV (Oshkosh JLTV)		United States	IMV MRAP	> 150	Ordered as part of the FLATM-PV programme (Future Littoral All Terrain Mobility – Patrol Vehicle). Orders: April 2025, contract for 150 JLTV signed; January 2026, contract worth €23 to 28 million for additional JLTV; To be equipped with Kongsberg RS4 RCWS with [[Remote controlled weapon station|C-UAS]] capabilities (selected in September 2026).
LIVS programme		Norway	Heavy mortar (120 mm)	20	Replacement of the existing heavy mortars, the MO-120 RT, with new systems, including precision guided munitions. 20 mortar systems to be purchased for the Marine Corps and the airborne 11. Luchtmobilen Brigade. Potential system if installed on the tracked articulated vehicle, as planned with the FLATM BV programme, the MWS 120 Ragnarok.
LIVS programme		–	Loitering munitions	N/A	Range planned of around 30 km.
PGR	(Illustration)	United States	Guided rocket	N/A	Likely based on the Hydra 70 APKWS rockets, to be equipped on the Manticore Patrol Vehicle; Potential systems: L3Harris VAMPIRE; Arnold Defense LAND-LGR4 Fletcher; Thales FZ275 launchers
PGR	(Illustration)	United States	Guided rocket	N/A	Likely based on the Hydra 70 APKWS rockets, to be equipped on the Manticore Patrol Vehicle; Potential systems: L3Harris VAMPIRE; Arnold Defense LAND-LGR4 Fletcher; Thales FZ275 launchers
PGR	(Illustration)	Belgium	Guided rocket	N/A	Likely based on the Hydra 70 APKWS rockets, to be equipped on the Manticore Patrol Vehicle; Potential systems: L3Harris VAMPIRE; Arnold Defense LAND-LGR4 Fletcher; Thales FZ275 launchers
FLATM BV programme	BvS10 Viking	Sweden	Tracked articulated armoured vehicle	50 - 100	The purchase is planned to be over by 2028. Potential variants: Armoured personnel carrier; Command and control vehicle; Logistics; Mortar carrier; Ambulance; Recovery variant; Potential / likely candidates: BvS10 Viking by BAE Systems Land Systems Hägglunds; Bronco ATTC by ST Kinetics; FAMOUS by Patria
FLATM BV programme	Bronco ATTC	Singapore	Tracked articulated armoured vehicle	50 - 100	The purchase is planned to be over by 2028. Potential variants: Armoured personnel carrier; Command and control vehicle; Logistics; Mortar carrier; Ambulance; Recovery variant; Potential / likely candidates: BvS10 Viking by BAE Systems Land Systems Hägglunds; Bronco ATTC by ST Kinetics; FAMOUS by Patria
FLATM BV programme	–	Finland	Tracked armoured vehicle	50 - 100	The purchase is planned to be over by 2028. Potential variants: Armoured personnel carrier; Command and control vehicle; Logistics; Mortar carrier; Ambulance; Recovery variant; Potential / likely candidates: BvS10 Viking by BAE Systems Land Systems Hägglunds; Bronco ATTC by ST Kinetics; FAMOUS by Patria

Equipment selected but no contract yet
Tender / competition launched or equipment financed by the parliament without firm order yet
Potential equipment in a middle-term future

== See also ==
- List of equipment of the Royal Netherlands Army
- List of active Royal Netherlands Navy ships
- List of active aircraft of the Royal Netherlands Air Force
