= Military bridge =

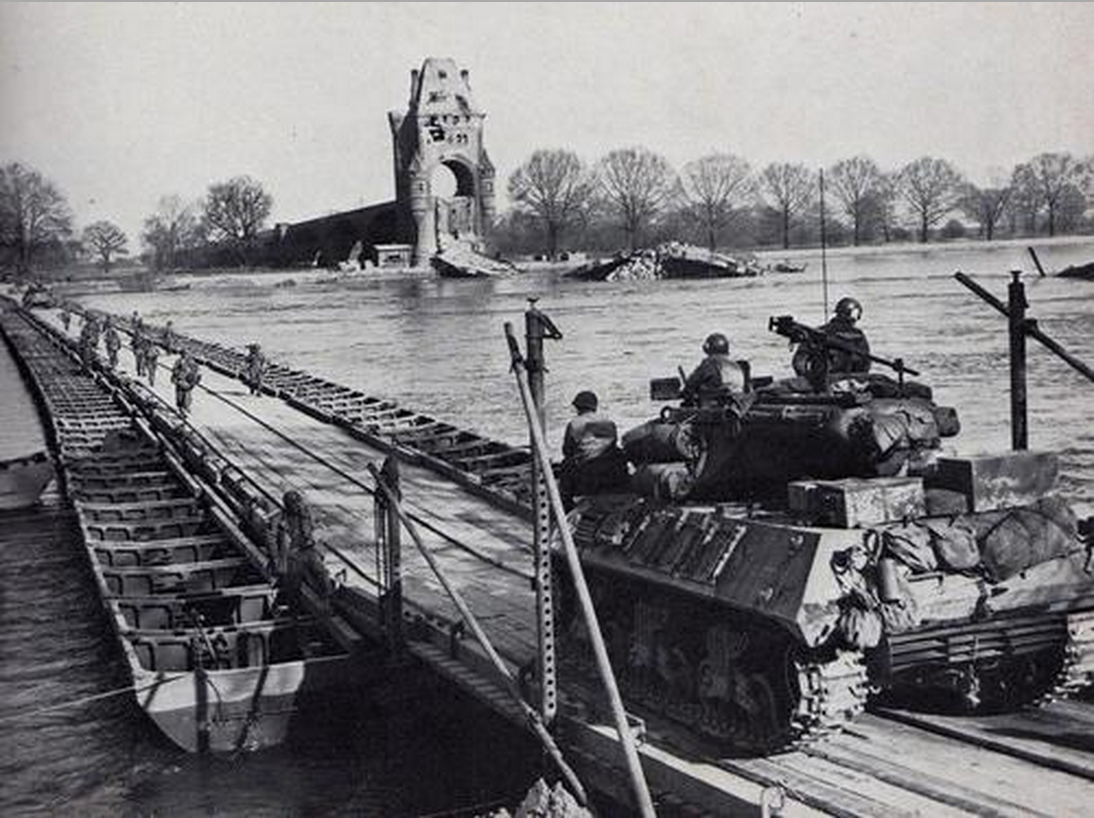
U.S. Army troops cross the Rhine on a heavy pontoon bridge, March 1945

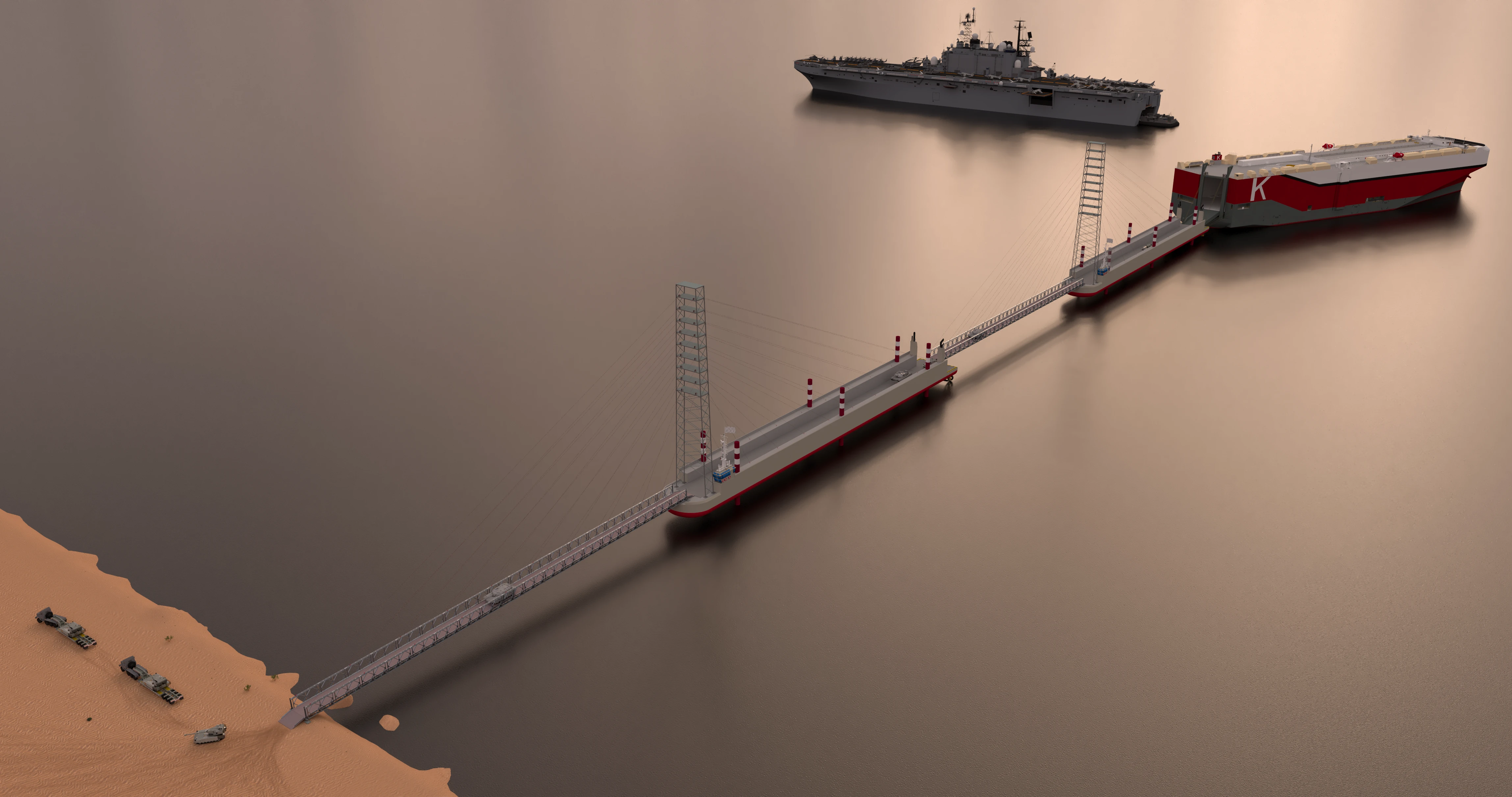
3D sketch of a bailey bridge barge dock being developed by China to potentially invade Taiwan (PLA Navy landing barges)

The following is a partial list of Military bridges

- AM 50
- Armoured vehicle-launched bridge
- Bailey bridge
- Callender-Hamilton bridge
- DSB Dry Support Bridge
- Mabey Logistic Support Bridge
- MGB Medium Girder Bridge
- Iivari's quick bridge
- Pontoon bridge

== See also ==
- Military engineer
- Military engineering
