= Rheinmetall Caracal =

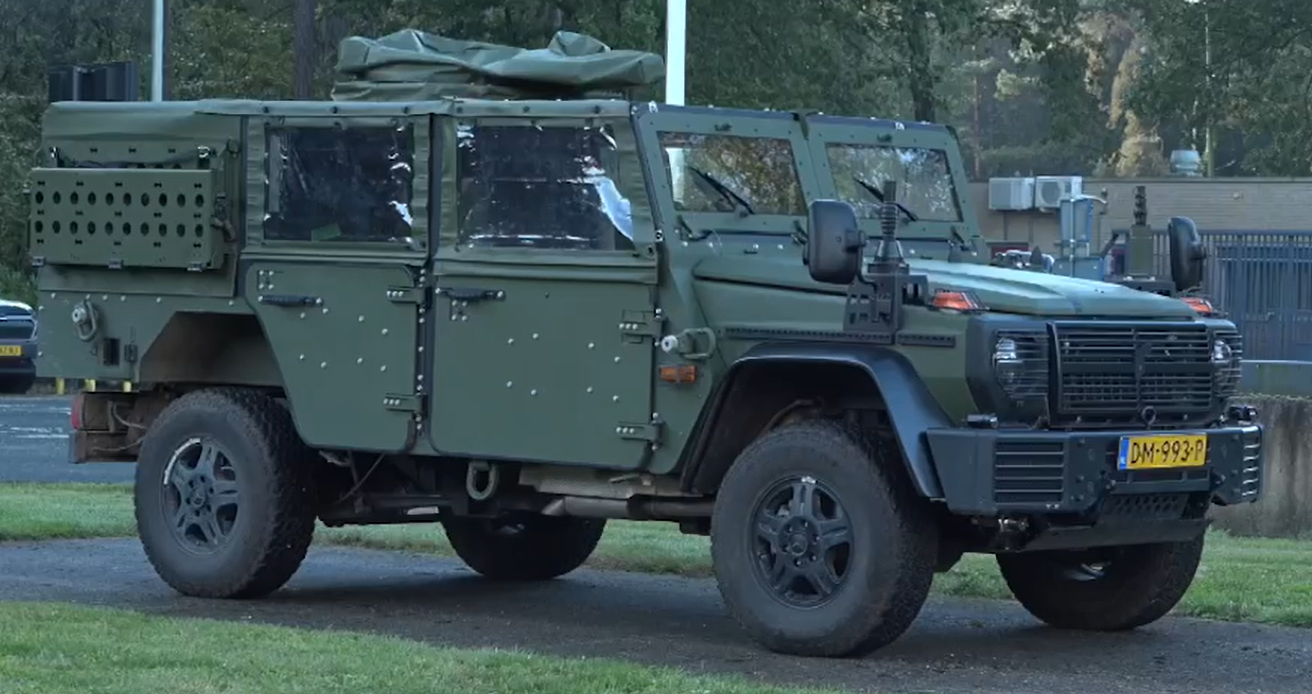
- A Caracal prototype in Dutch service
- Type: Military light utility vehicle
- Place of origin: Germany

Service history
- In service: Expected 2025
- Used by: See operators

Production history
- Manufacturer: Rheinmetall; Mercedes-Benz; ACS Armoured Car Systems; VDL Groep
- Developed from: ACS ENOK AB
- Variants: see variants

Specifications
- Mass: 3,700 kg (8,200 lb)
- Length: 4,706 mm (185.3 in)
- Width: 1,890 mm (74 in)
- Height: 1,818 mm (71.6 in)
- Armor: see protection
- Main armament: 1 × 40 mm HK GMG or .50 caliber M2 Browning heavy machine gun or Spike LR2 anti-tank guided missile
- Engine: Mercedes-Benz OM 642 LS DE 30 LA, V6, 3.0 litres (2,987 cc), Euro 3, diesel engine 249 PS (183 kW), 600 N⋅m (440 lbf⋅ft)
- Power/weight: 50.8 PS/t (37.4 kW/t) at full weight
- Payload capacity: 1,200 kg (2,600 lb)
- Maximum speed: 130 km/h (81 mph)

The Caracal is a German military light utility vehicle developed by Rheinmetall in cooperation with Mercedes-Benz and ACS Armoured Car Systems.

The vehicle was selected by the German Army and Royal Netherlands Army in 2023 as part of a joint airborne vehicle replacement program. The vehicle has been undergoing trials since 2024 and is due to enter service in 2025 within the Rapid Forces Division and 11th Airmobile Brigade.

== Description ==
The Caracal is based on the military 464 series of the Mercedes-Benz G-Class; this is a so-called militarised version based on the original G 461 with rigid axles and is manufactured in Graz (Austria). The W 464 platform has been in production since August 2023. The modular structure of the vehicle is supplied by ACS Armoured Car Systems. Rheinmetall serves as general contractor and delivers the vehicles in the required variants after final assembly. Rheinmetall will also develop the armament kits, qualify the vehicles and provide logistical support. Final assembly is done in the Netherlands, at Rheinmetall Nederland in Ede VDL Groep in Eindhoven.

=== Armament ===
==== Weapon mounts ====
The Caracal in its base variant is equipped with two weapon mounts.

- A ring mount that is operated by a gunner. It is the Rheinmetall Softmount Multimount, and it has different adapters for the different weapons. These mounts are designed to clip on the ringmount, and to be equipped with heavy machine guns, automatic grenade launchers and anti-tank guided missile launchers (M2 Browning, MG6, HK GMG, Spike LR2).
- A commander mount, a swingmount, MG4, MG5 in German service, or an FN Minimi or FN MAG in Dutch service.

==== Other armament ====
The Caracal has also been displayed with a quadruple bank of launchers for HERO-120 loitering munitions.

=== Protection ===
For protection purposes, the vehicle can be equipped with Rheinmetall's smoke grenade dischargers, the so-called Rapid Obscuring System (ROSY).

In terms of armour, Rheinmetall provides optional modular ballistic and mine protection packages.

- Ballistic protection: armour package conforming to STANAG 4569 protection level 1, including the Fragment Simulating Projectiles (FSP) test.
- Mine protection: armour package conforming to STANAG 4569 protection level 1 (DM31), including the Fragment Simulating Projectiles (FSP) test.

=== Air transportability ===
Up to two vehicles can be transported as internal load (in the short wheelbase version) or one underslung by the CH-47F Chinook and CH-53K King Stallion helicopters. Moreover, the Caracal is air-portable with Boeing C-17 Globemaster, Lockheed Martin C-130, Embraer KC-390 and Airbus A400M transport aircraft.

=== Variants ===
Rheinmetall offers 4 main variants as of 2026:

- Caracal 4×4 as a passenger transport vehicle with different roles
- Caracal 4×4 as an ambulance vehicle
- Caracal 6×6 as a group transport vehicle
- Caracal 6×6 as a material transport vehicle (3.2 tons payload)

== Background ==
=== Dutch replacement project ===
In October 2018 the Netherlands ministry of Defence awarded a contract to Mercedes-Benz for the delivery of 515 vehicles as part of the project Vehicle 12kN Air Assault. Three years later, the Dutch MoD decided to terminate the contract as the supplier could not meet the protection requirements with regard to artillery threat in combination with the required payload.

As a result of the operational urgency, obsolescence of the airborne vehicle fleet and the integration of the 11th Airmobile Brigade into the German Rapid Forces Division, a memorandum of understanding (MOU) was signed with Germany in June 2022 for the joint acquisition of an airborne vehicle with a payload capacity of 12 kN. The requirements for the airborne vehicle were harmonised with Germany in order to achieve an identical, interoperable and interchangeable vehicle. To this end, a new and joint programme of requirements has been established for the binational project, with a focus on airmobile operations high in the spectrum of violence and in the context of the first main task.

=== Procurement ===
In the replacement program, the Caracal competed with the Defenture ATTV family of vehicles. Specifically for this program, Defenture joined forces with Krauss-Maffei Wegmann. Both companies made an offer which conformed to the requirements. In the end, based on the operational and technical requirements and a substantial price difference, the Caracal was downselected.

The German Armed Forces and Netherlands Armed Forces agreed on key points in a framework agreement with Rheinmetall: The German Armed Forces want to procure a total of up to 2,054 vehicles and the Netherlands Armed Forces up to 1,004 vehicles. The framework agreement has a total value of up to €1.9 billion gross and the German share will be financed from the German armed forces' special fund.

The vehicles are to be used in variants for personnel transport, logistics, as well as medical vehicles and will replace the Wolf and the Mungo in the Rapid Forces Division. The Netherlands will use the Caracal in the 11th Airmobile Brigade, where it will replace the Luchtmobiel Speciaal Voertuig, Mercedes-Benz G280 CDI among others. Delivery of the first test models took place in the first quarter of 2024, with series delivery scheduled to begin in early 2025.

As a first step, 1,508 vehicles - 1,004 for Germany and 504 for the Netherlands - worth around €870 million including VAT were ordered from the framework contract. According to Rheinmetall, the final assembly of the vehicles will take place entirely in the Netherlands at sites of VDL Groep and Rheinmetall Nederland.

In November 2023, it was announced that Ukraine would receive 5 vehicles as part of the upgrade aid. A further delivery of 20 additional vehicles was announced in February 2024.

=== Systems ===
==== Germany ====
Exail supplies the INS navigation systems, the Advans Ursa, for the German fleet.

== Operators ==
The following list of military users mainly contains states in which the Rheinmetall Caracal is or will be in active military service;

Germany (1,004 on order)
Common framework agreement signed in July 2023 for up to 2,054 Caracal for the Rapid Forces Division German Army and 1,004 Caracal for the Royal Netherlands Army, with full scale production to start in 2025.
The first firm order for Germany was signed in July 2023, for 1,004 vehicles.
The delivery was planned for early 2025, but as of May 2025, problems in the project delayed the delivery.
Netherlands (504 on order)
Common framework agreement signed in July 2023 for up to 2,054 Caracal for the German Army and 1,004 Caracal for the 11th Airmobile Brigade of the Royal Netherlands Army, with full scale production to start in 2025.
The first firm order for Germany is for 504 vehicles.
The first firm order for Germany was signed in July 2023, for 504 vehicles.
Ukraine (25 on order)
5 received in November 2023 under a first order, 20 received in 2024 under a second order.
