= Medium Girder Bridge =

Modular military bridge

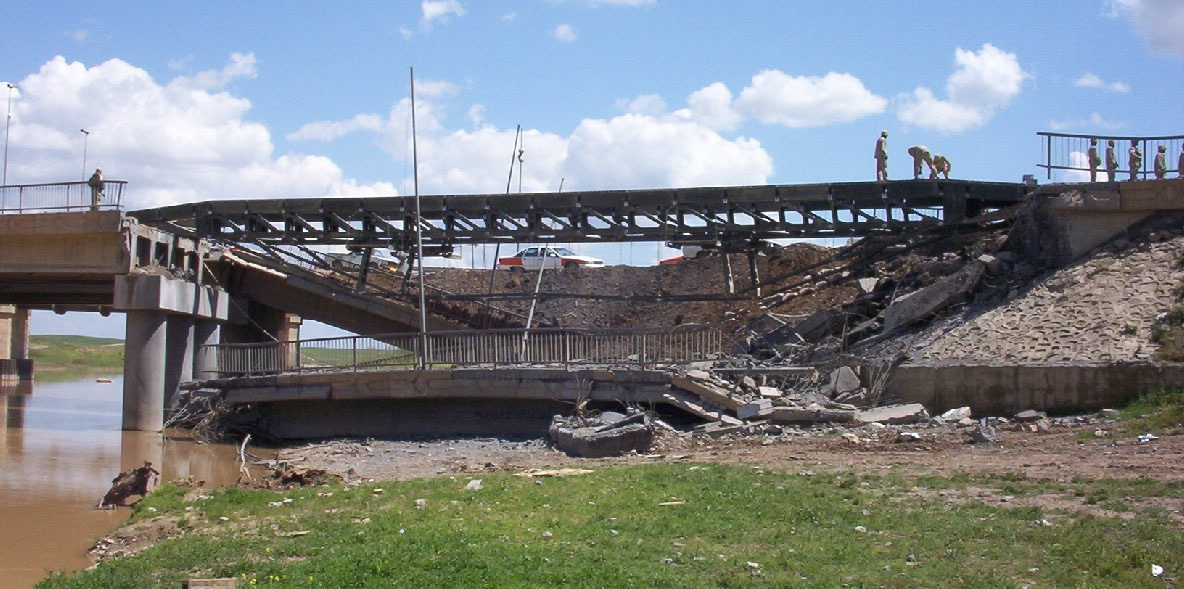
A 16-Bay with LRS Medium Girder Bridge across the Kazer River, Mosul, Iraq, 2003.

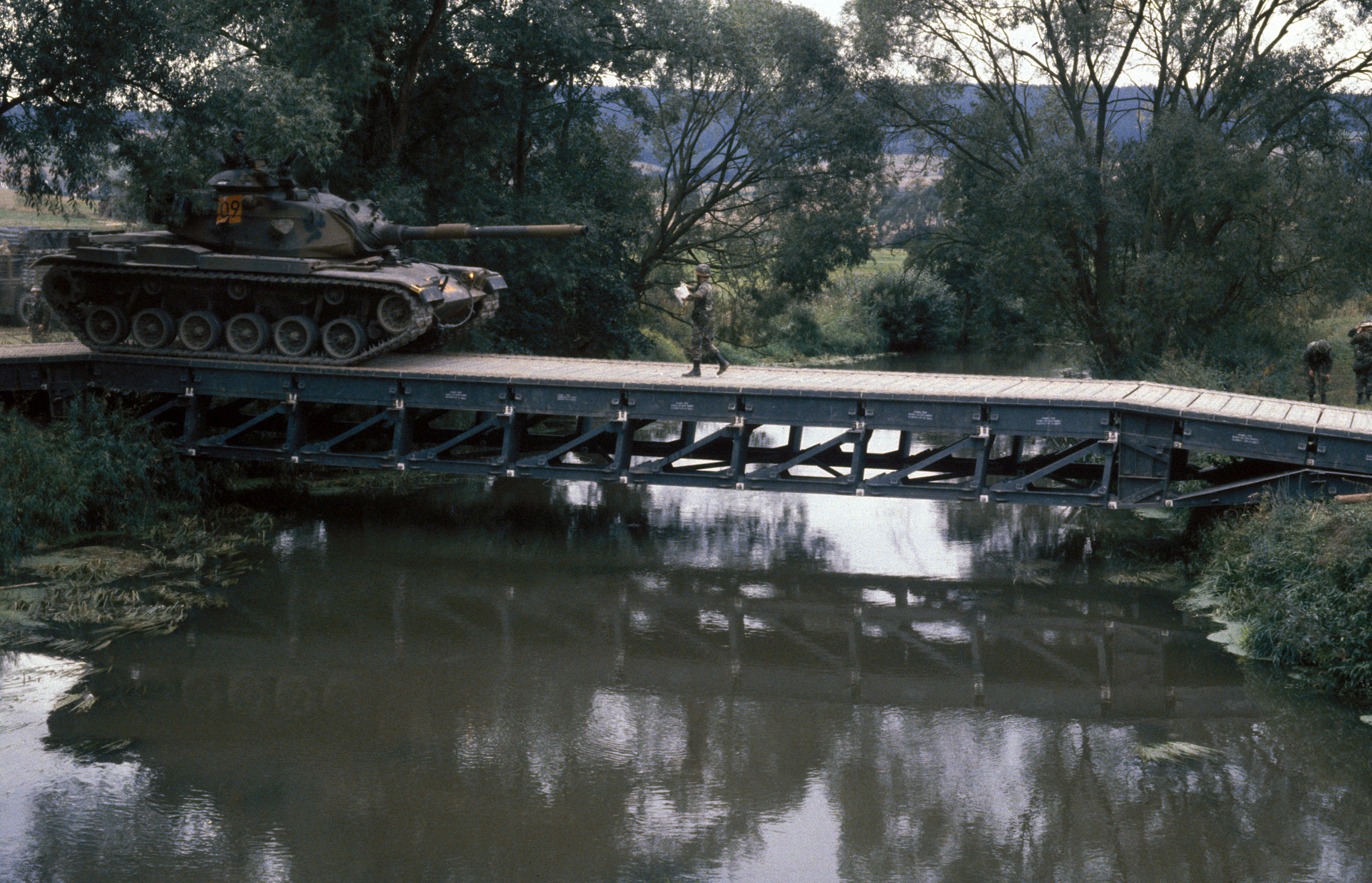
An M60A3 main battle tank crosses a medium girder bridge during Exercise REFORGER '83 in Germany, 1983

The medium girder bridge (MGB) is a lightweight, man-portable bridge that can be assembled without help from heavy equipment. In addition, it is also a deck type, two-girder bridging system capable of carrying loads up to and including main battle tanks (MBT).

MGB was originally produced by Fairey Engineering Ltd. in Stockport, England, and is still made to this day by its successor KNDS UK (formerly WFEL), based on a design by MVEE in Christchurch.

MGB was originally sold to the British Army in 1971, subsequently also being sold to many other nations, including the Canadian, Dutch, Danish, Swiss, German and US Militaries.

== Configurations and deployment ==
The primary components of the MGB system are rectangular "top deck" segments, and triangular bracing "bottom deck" segments. All segments are man portable.

Short/low load bridges can be constructed using just top deck components. Bracing with the additional lower deck dramatically strengthens the bridge allowing heavier loads and longer spans. Single spans can reach 48 metres.

The segments have knuckle joints at each end; assembly consists of simply engaging the knuckle joints of adjacent segments then inserting a pin through a hole down the length of the knuckle. In this way as many segments as are needed are connected end to end to form a girder of the required length to span the obstruction.

Two such longitudinal girders are constructed parallel to each other to provide the bridge's strength. Deck units are then laid between these to form a 4.0 m (13 ft 2 in) wide roadway.

MGB can be built in various configurations to provide a full range of bridging capability for use both in the forward battle area and in the communications zone. Speed of erection by the low number of soldiers is its major characteristic. The MGB also requires very little maintenance once erected, is air transportable in either standard palletised loads or in partially assembled bridge configurations, and all US components will fit MGBs in use by allies (except for the launching nose cross girder posts)

The bridge can be supported on unprepared and uneven ground without grillages. It is constructed on one roller beam for single-story construction; two roller beams, 4.6 m apart, for double-story construction; and on three roller beams when constructing a double-story bridge over 12 bays long. The ends of the roller beams are supported on base plates and each can be adjusted in height. No leveling or other preparation of the ground is required. Single-span bridges are launched using a centrally mounted launching nose.

== Parts ==
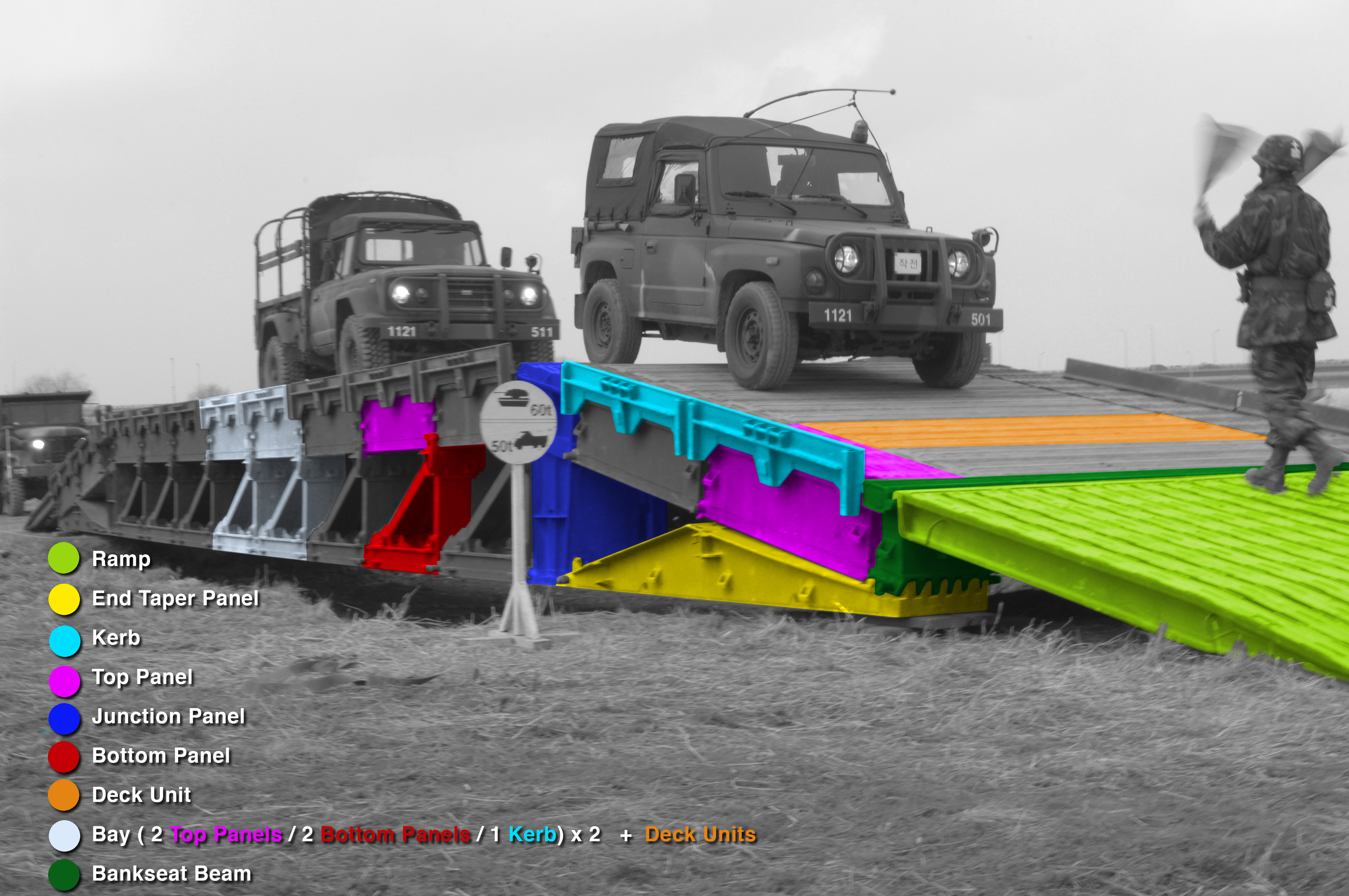
MGB Parts

The MGB parts are fabricated from a specially developed zinc, magnesium, and aluminium alloy (DGFVE 232A). This enables a lightweight, high strength bridge to be built. All except three parts weigh under 200 kg. Most parts can be handled easily by four soldiers.

- Top panel — Used to build the bridge girders. There are 7 panel points on each top panel; it is 6 ft 4 in (1.93 m) long, 2' 1^{3}/_{8}" wide, 1' 9^{5}/_{8}" high (1930 mm × 645 mm × 549 mm), weight 385 lb (175 kg).
- Bay (same as above)
- Bottom panel — Used as a brace for bridge girders. it is 6 ft 5 in (1.96 m) long, 2' 3" wide, 3' 7^{3}/_{8}" high, weight 435 lb (197 kg).
- End taper panel — Used as a bottom brace between the junction panel and bankseat beam. is 13' 2^{5}/_{8}" long, 2'4" wide, 1'6" high, and weight 600 lb (270 kg). It is one component that requires at least 6 soldiers to carry
- Bankseat beam — Used to keep the bridge girders properly spaced and provide connection for the ramp units. It is one of three components that requires at least 6 soldiers to carry; it is 13' 3^{1}/_{2}" long, 1' 9^{3}/_{8}" wide, and 1’ 6" high and weighs 570 lb (260 kg).
- Ramps — There are two types: US and UK ramps. The UK or short ramps are 264 lb (120 kg) and the US or long ramps are 400 lb (180 kg). Each type provides an approach to the bridge, 7 are required at each end. UK ramps are used for single storey only.
- Deck unit — 9'1" long, 1' 5^{1}/_{4}" wide, 6^{7}/_{8}" high, weight 163 lb (74 kg) it requires 2 soldiers to carry. This component fills in the gap between girders. Four deck units are required per bay of bridge.
- Junction panel — Used as a brace between the sloped and level part of a double story bridge. It is 5'^{3}/_{4}" high, 3' 5^{1}/_{2}" long on top, 2' 2^{3}/_{4}" long on the bottom, 2' 1^{1}/_{2}" wide, weight 478 lb (217 kg).
- Sway brace
- Kerb

== Configurations ==
=== Single storey ===
Up to 9.8 m span with a MLC of 130 wheeled or 85 tracked

The single-storey MGB bridge is constructed using top panels which are pinned together to form two girders and joined at each end by a bank seat beam creating a rigid framework. This type of bridge is used for short span, that can carry heavy loads. Longer bridges are only able to carry lighter loads. Single-storey bridges can be constructed by 9 to 17 soldiers.

=== Double storey ===
Up to 31.1 m span with a MLC of 100 wheeled or 70 tracked

In the double-storey MGB bridge, the girders consist of top and bottom panels, with junction panels and end taper panels forming the sloping end of the bridge. In both cases, ramp, deck and curb units complete the construction. The heavier duty double-storey configuration is used for heavy loads or longer spans. The normal building party for double-storey bridges is 25 soldiers.

=== Double storey with link reinforcement ===
Up to 49.4 m span with a MLC of 100 wheeled or 70 tracked

The MGB Link Reinforcement Set (LRS) consists of reinforcing links which are 3.66 metres (12 ft) long, plus short links of 1.82 metres (6 ft), which are pinned together to form chains under each girder.

The chains are suspended 2 metres (6 ft 6 in) beneath each bottom chord of the bridge and tensioned after building, by pulling the reinforcing posts into the vertical position. This creates a fully reinforced structure.

The Link Reinforcement Set (LRS) is constructed when a long, high class type of bridge is required. The LRS deepens the girder and transfers the load throughout the length of the bridge. This type of construction requires a building party of 34 soldiers, and is built on three roller beams.

Although using an LRS provides a longer bridge span, it lowers the Military Load Classification (MLC) from 70 to 60. This prohibits the heavier vehicles in use by the military from crossing.

=== Multi-span Bridges ===
2 span double storey up to 51.5 m with a MLC of 70

3 span double storey up to 76 m with a MLC of 70

The MGB Span Junction Set consists of span junction posts, which are pinned together at the top and connected at the bottom by hydraulic articulators.

The Span Junction Set gives the MGB Double Storey bridge a multi-span capability and allows bridges to be constructed over supports which are either fixed or floating. These may include any combination of existing supports, pontoons, existing or improvised piers and the MGB Portable Pier.

MGB Double Storey multi-span bridges usually take the form of two or three span structures rated at MLC 70. The two-span bridge can have an overall length of up to 51.5 metres (169 ft), while the three span can be 76 metres (250 ft). This requires a total crew of 40 personnel—24 for the main bridge, 8 for the MGB Portable Pier and 8 to install anchorages.

=== Floating MGB ===
Up to MLC of 60

Floating MGBs can be constructed in single or double storey configurations using the same components as the dry bridge configurations:

- Double storey construction allows landing bay spans up to 26.5 metres (86 ft 11 in) and is suitable for conditions where there is considerable rise and fall in water levels.
- Single storey construction provides either floating bridges or ferries for load classes up to MLC 60.

Single and double storey Floating MGBs can be built using standard MGB superstructures, carried on MGB Pontoons with single storey hinge bays or double storey Span Junction Sets to provide articulation. The length of these bridges is limited only by the amount of equipment available.

MGB pontoons

The MGB Pontoon is fabricated from marine grade aluminum alloy.

Two pontoons are coupled back to back to create each pontoon pier. Three such piers make up one landing bay raft. Powered pontoons are driven by a 75 hp (56 kW) diesel engine with a water jet propulsion unit. Fully laden pontoons can operate in currents up to 2.5 m/s (4.9 knots).

=== MACH MGB ===
MACH MGB (Mechanically Aided Construction by Hand) is a semi-mechanized bridge building system, which reduces the size of construction crews from 25 to 9, for similar build times.

This is achieved by preassembling MGB components into modules in a separate assembly area or moving them as whole modules of beams and lower panels plus a special junction module to the bridge site . The bridge is then constructed using a suitable crane or CALM vehicle.

MACH MGB uses standard MGB components supplemented by special components designed to assist mechanical handling.

The advantages of MACH MGB over other purpose-built mechanized systems are:

- Any suitably sized crane can be used.
- Reduced manpower compared to standard MGB.
- The bridge can still be built by hand if the crane or hydraulics are incapacitated.
- MACH MGB is field proven and used worldwide.

MGB handrail

The MGB handrail is designed to provide a significant increase in awareness of roadway width for both military and civilian drivers. It consists of vertical connecting posts with longitudinal hand rails, creating a continuous barrier along the edge of the bridge. Handrail components can be carried on an MGB palletor unit transport.

== Construction ==
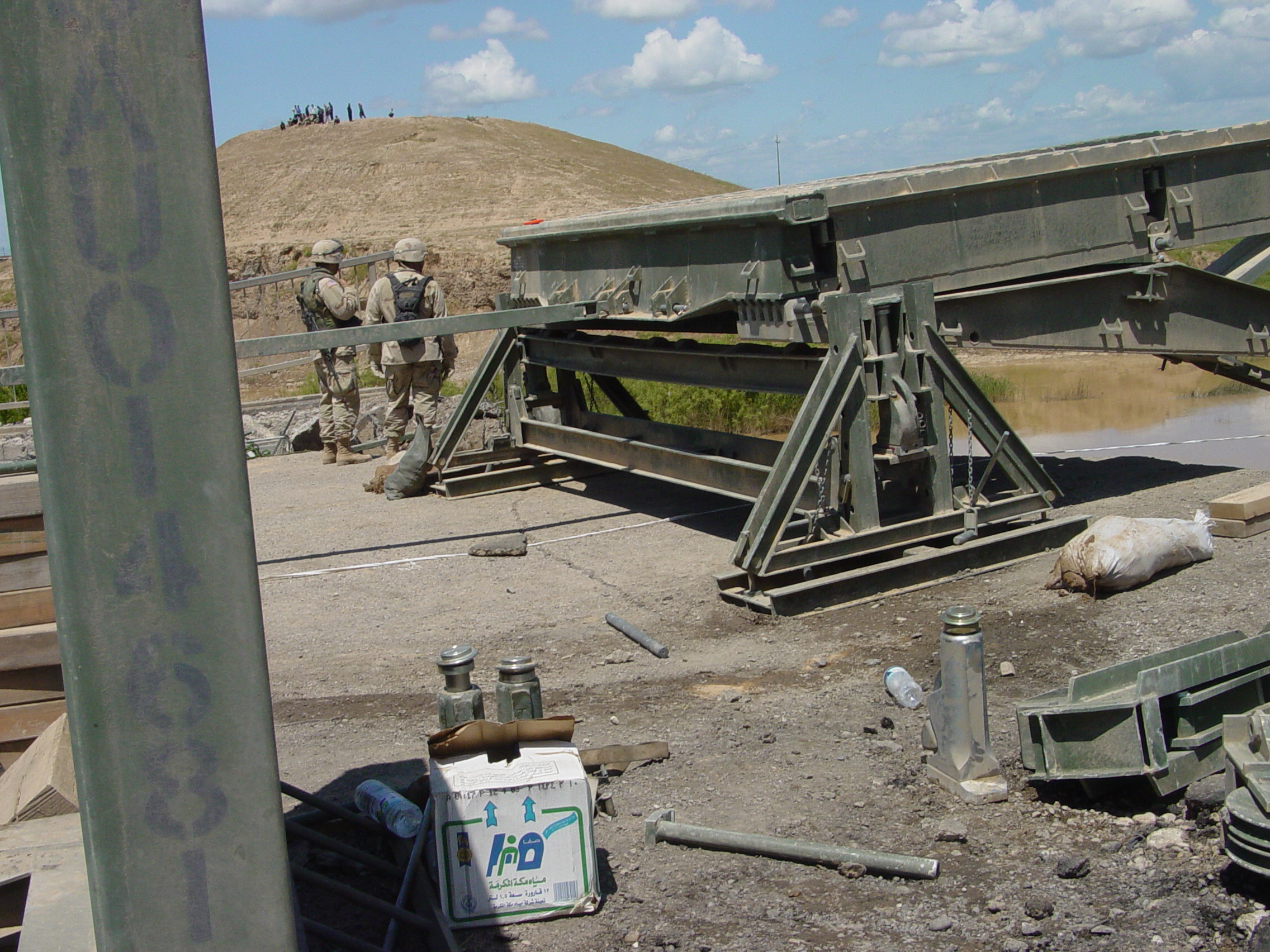
Capsil Roller Beam of the Medium Girder Bridge. Used as an extension to the construction frame to roll the bridge out over the gap. Kazer River, Mosul, Iraq, 2003.

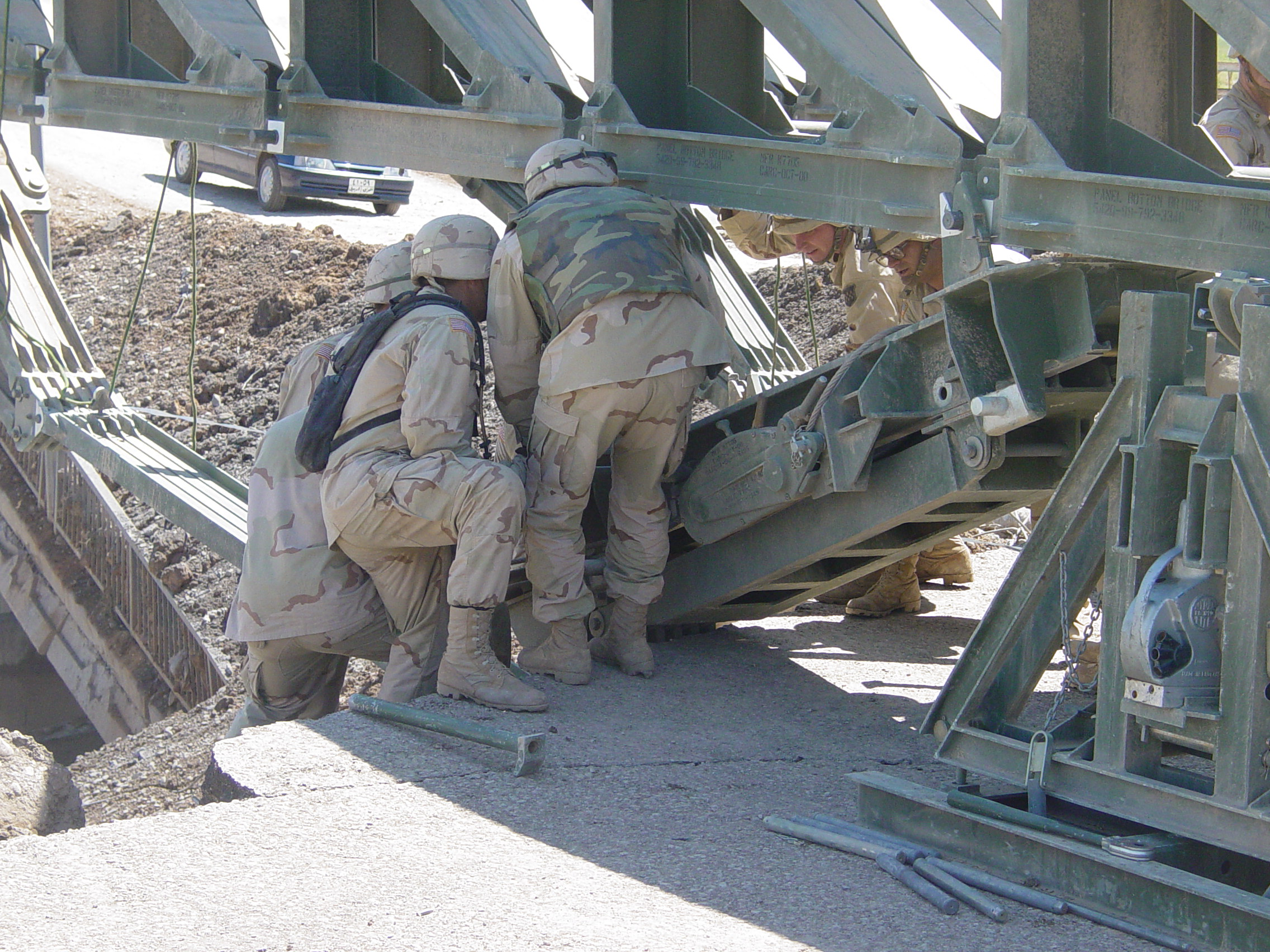
Soldiers (299 MRBC USAR ) attach the link reinforcement set to the underside of the bottom panel

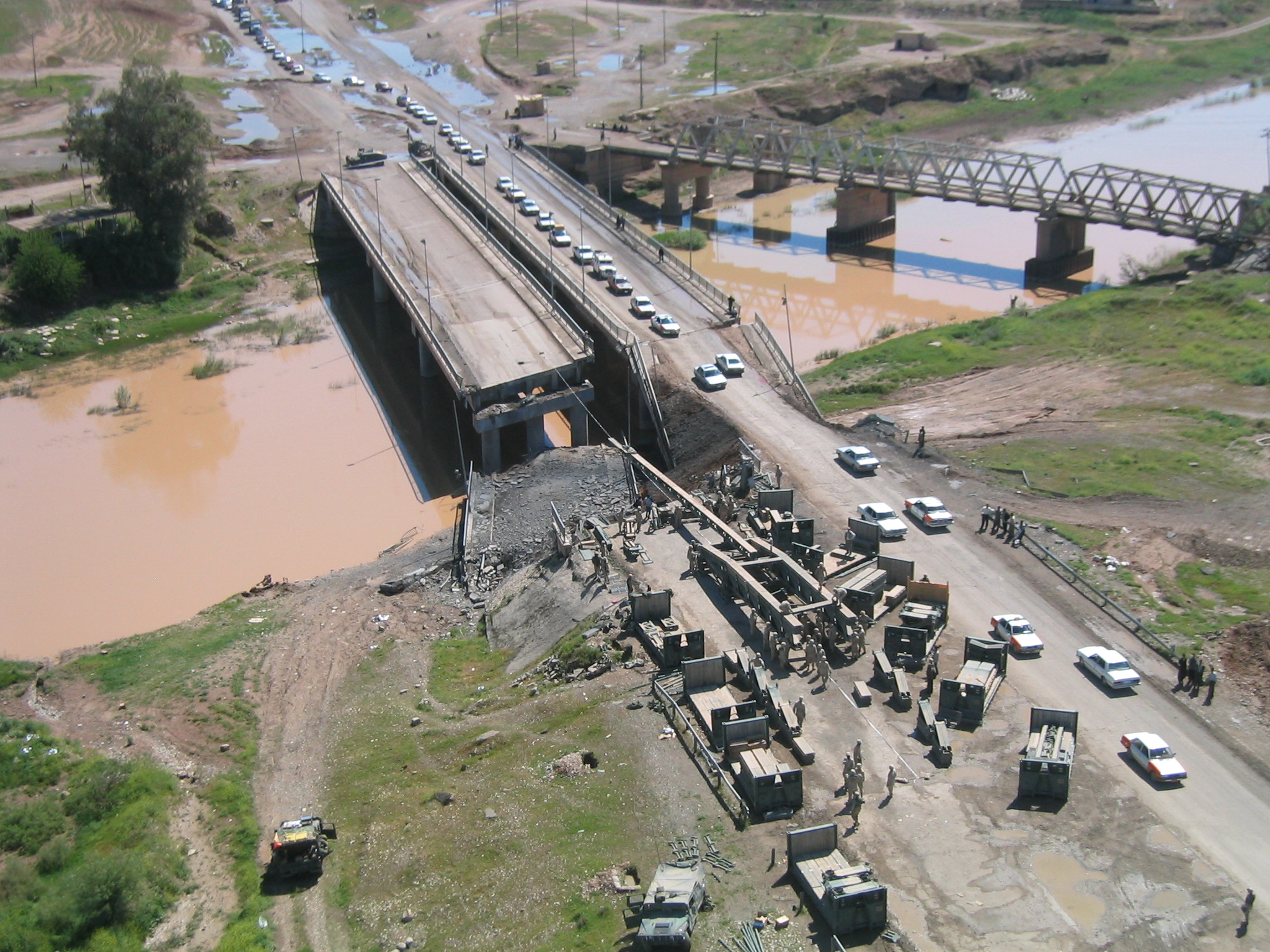
Aerial view of the erection site of a Medium Girder Bridge over the Kazer River, Mosul, Iraq, 2003.

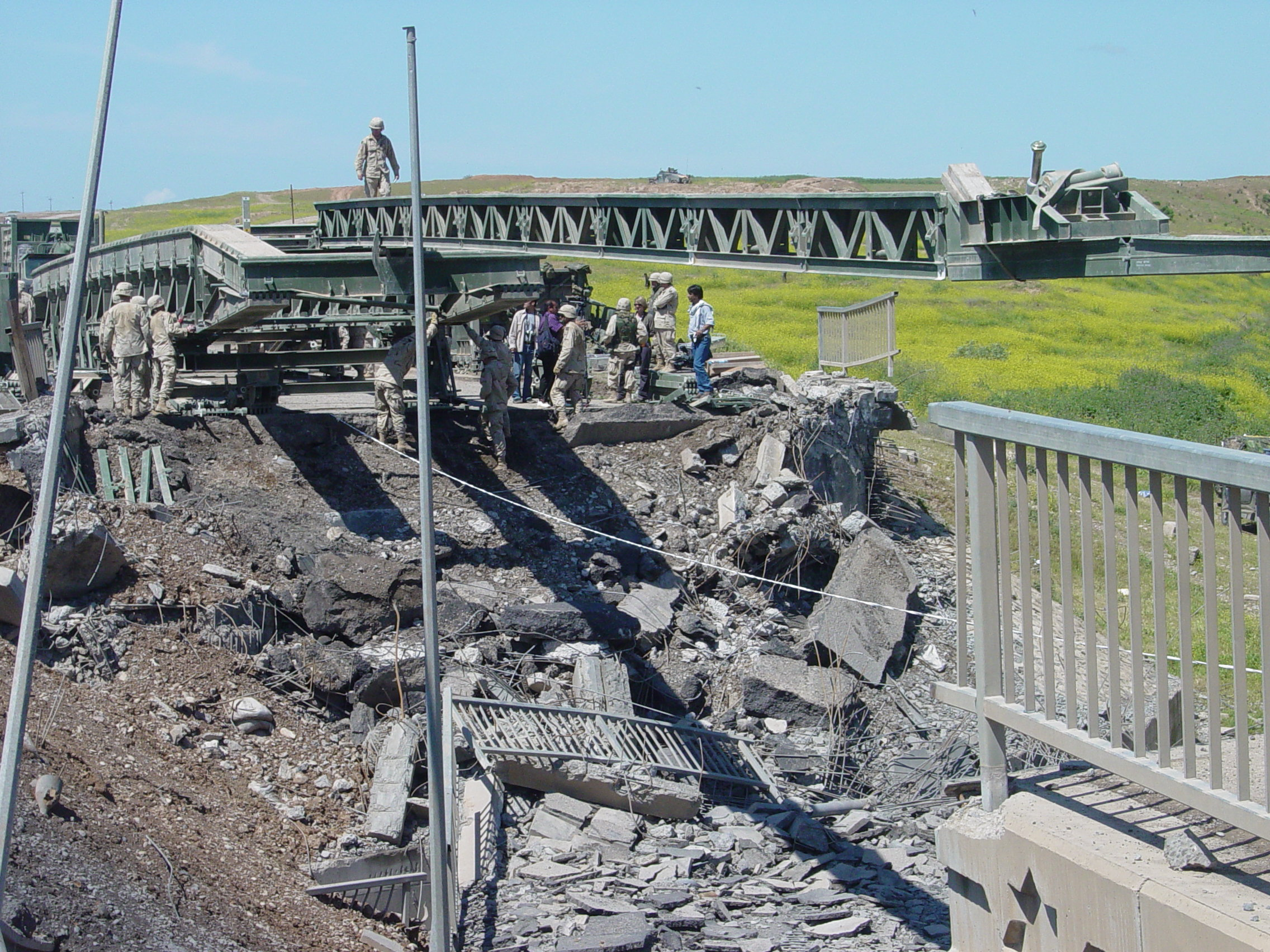
The MGB launching nose suspended over the gap. Kazer River, Mosul, Iraq, 2003.

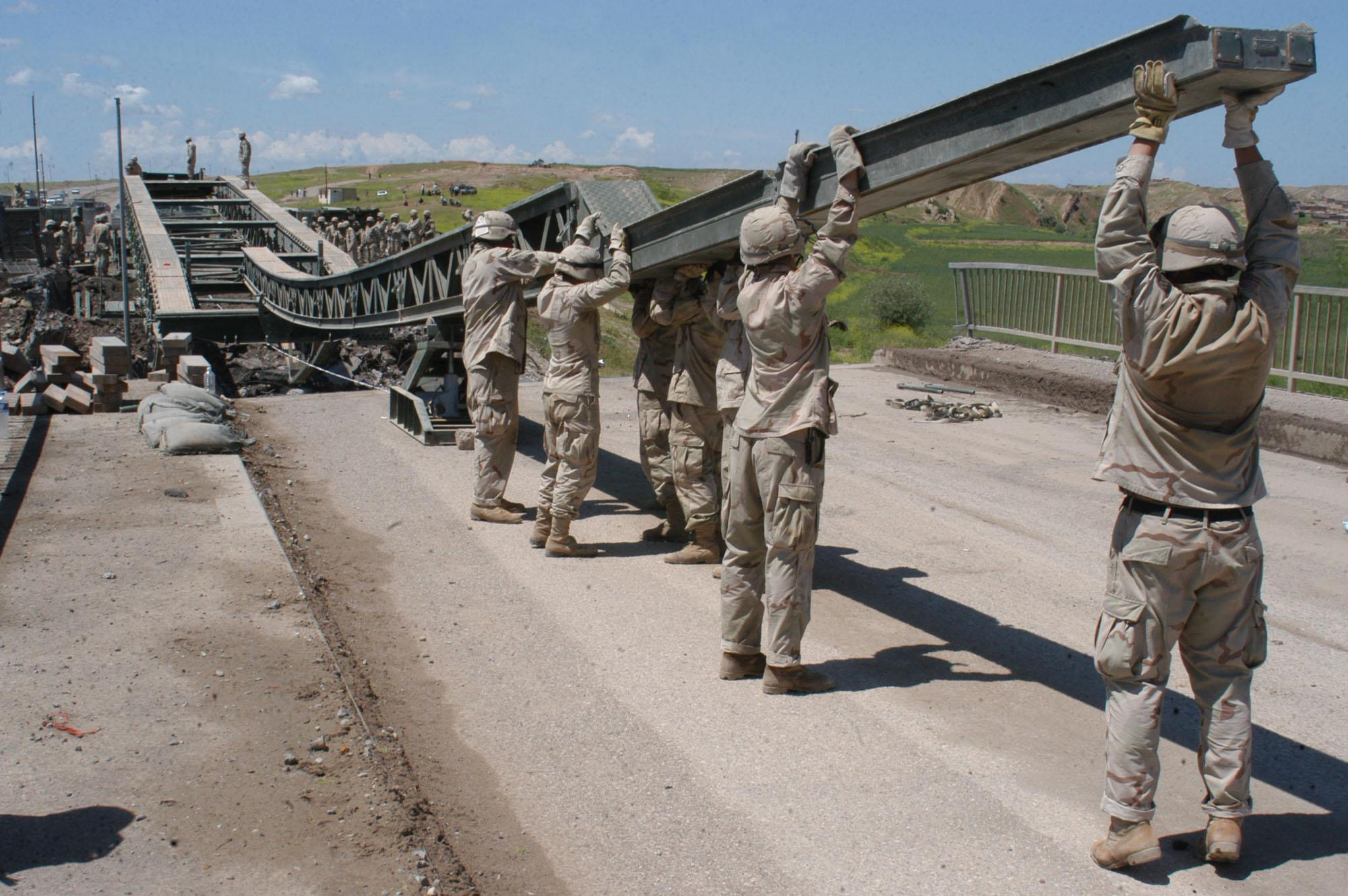
Soldiers (299 MRBC) steady the launch nose of a Medium Girder Bridge during erection over the Kazer River, Mosul, Iraq, 2003.

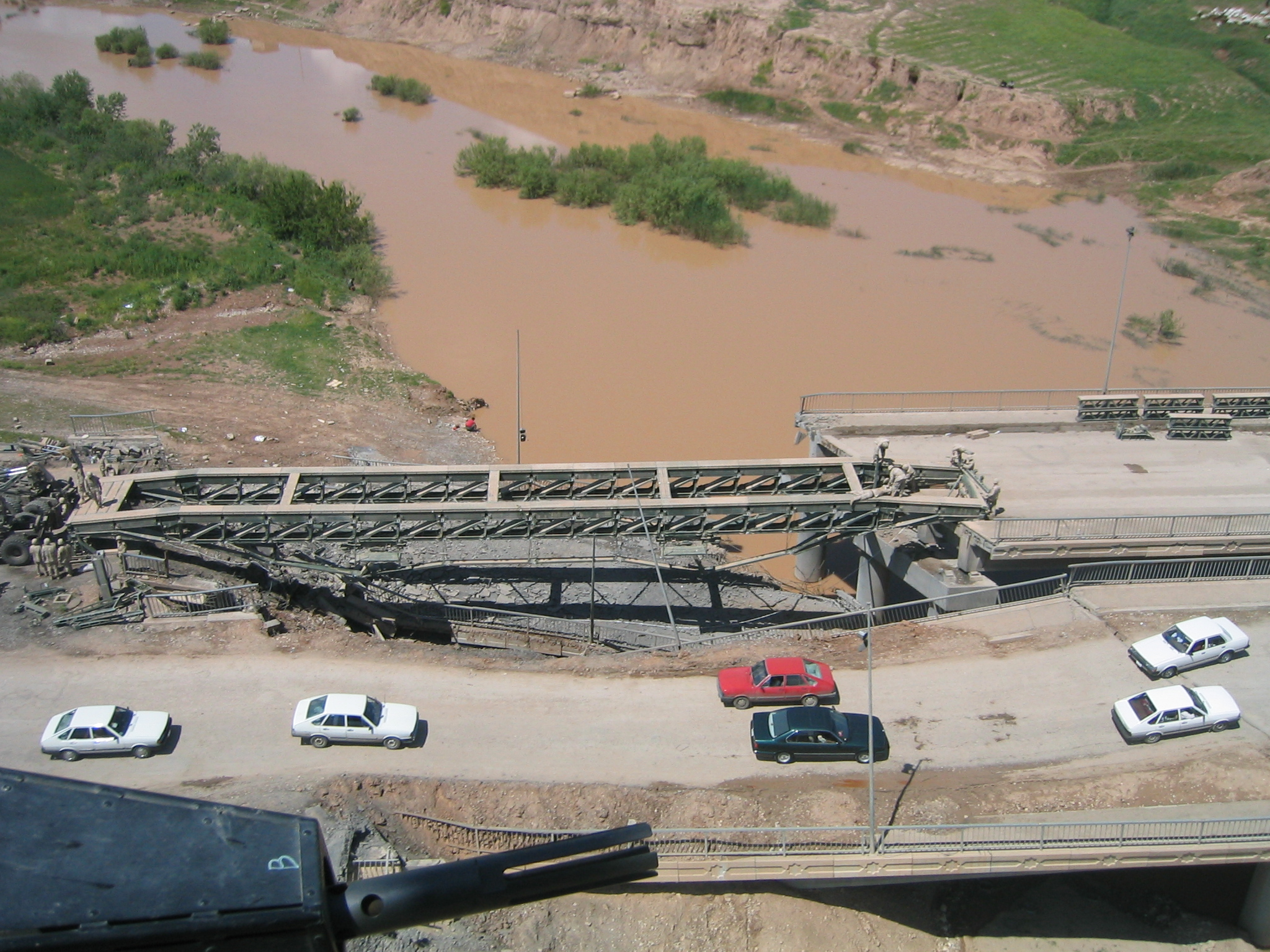
Aerial view of the nearly complete erection of a Medium Girder Bridge over the Kazer River, Mosul, Iraq, 2003.

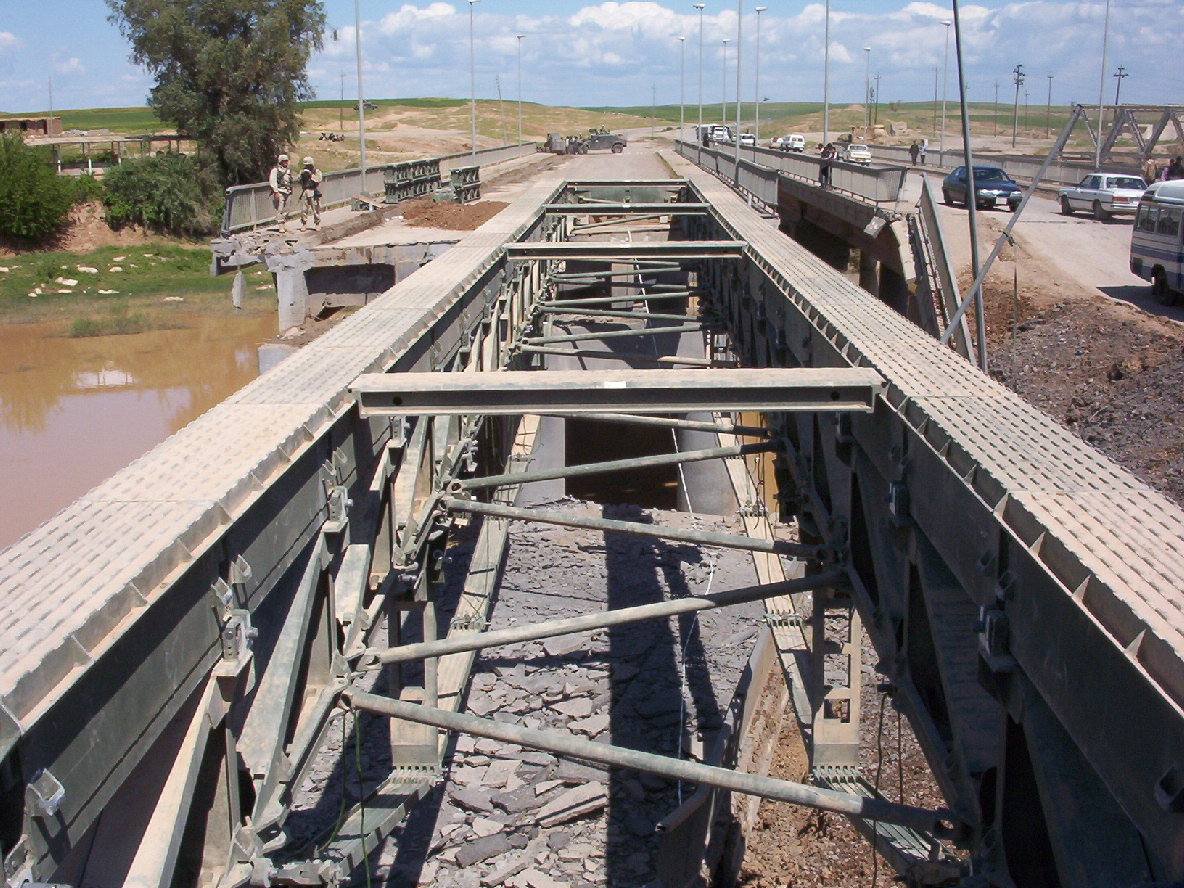
A view of the sway brace system of a Medium Girder Bridge before the decking is placed. Kazer River, Mosul, Iraq, 2003.

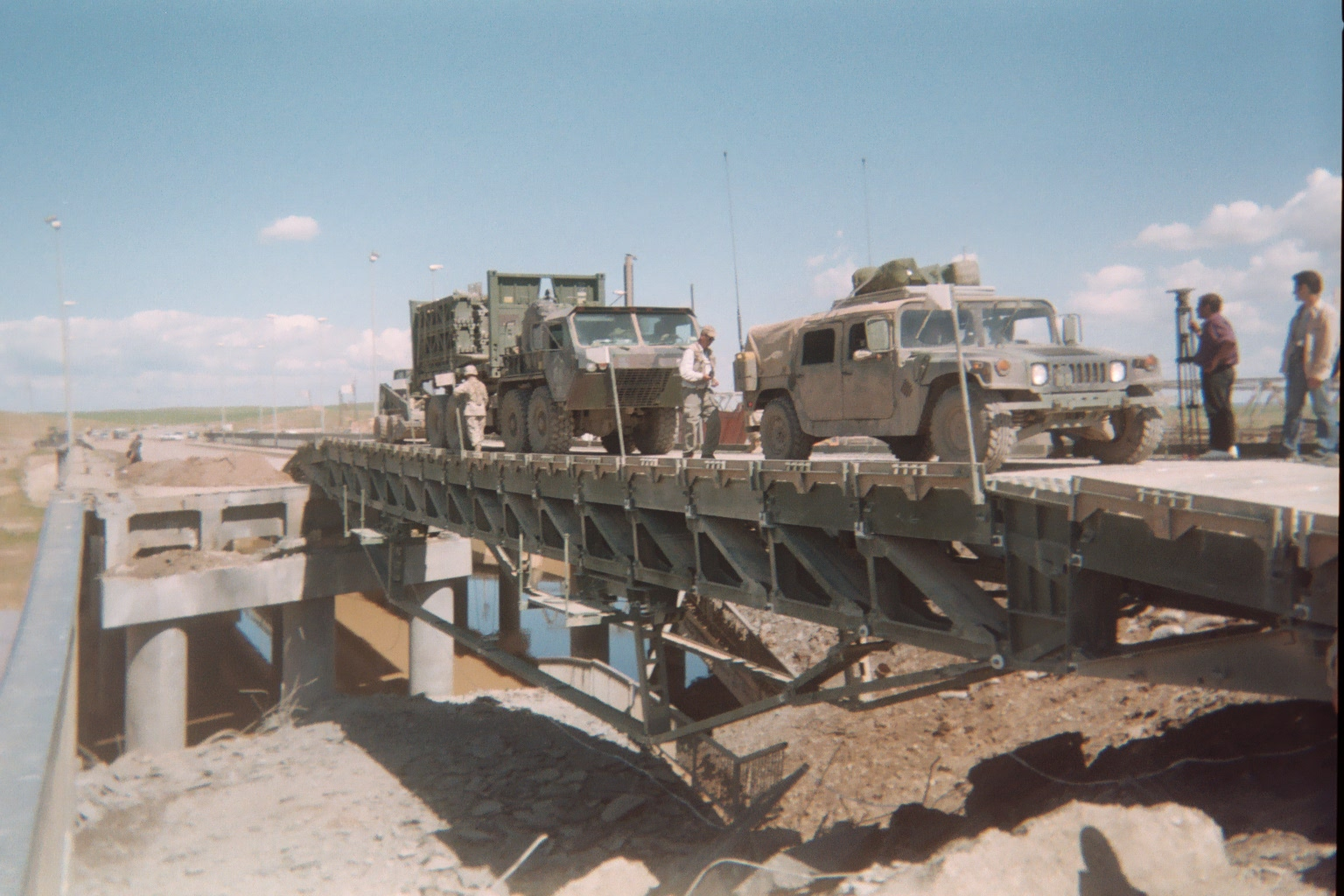
A fully erected Medium Girder Bridge crosses its first traffic over the Kazer River, Mosul, Iraq, 2003.

== Users ==
Over 500 bridges had been delivered to 40 countries.

- Australia
- Belgium
- Canada
- Chile
- Denmark
- Egypt
- Germany
- Greece
- India
- Indonesia
- Iraq
- Ireland
- Israel
- Italy
- Japan
- Jordan
- Morocco
- Netherlands
- Norway
- Oman
- Pakistan
- Poland
- Portugal
- Republic of China (Taiwan)
- South Africa
- Singapore
- South Korea
- Thailand
- Turkey
- United Arab Emirates
- United States
- Venezuela

== See also ==
- Bailey bridge for another bridge type with mobile military application.
- Callender-Hamilton bridge
- Mabey Logistic Support Bridge
- Military engineer
- Pontoon bridge for another bridge type with mobile military application
