= Netherlands Fractal Pattern =

Dutch military camouflage pattern

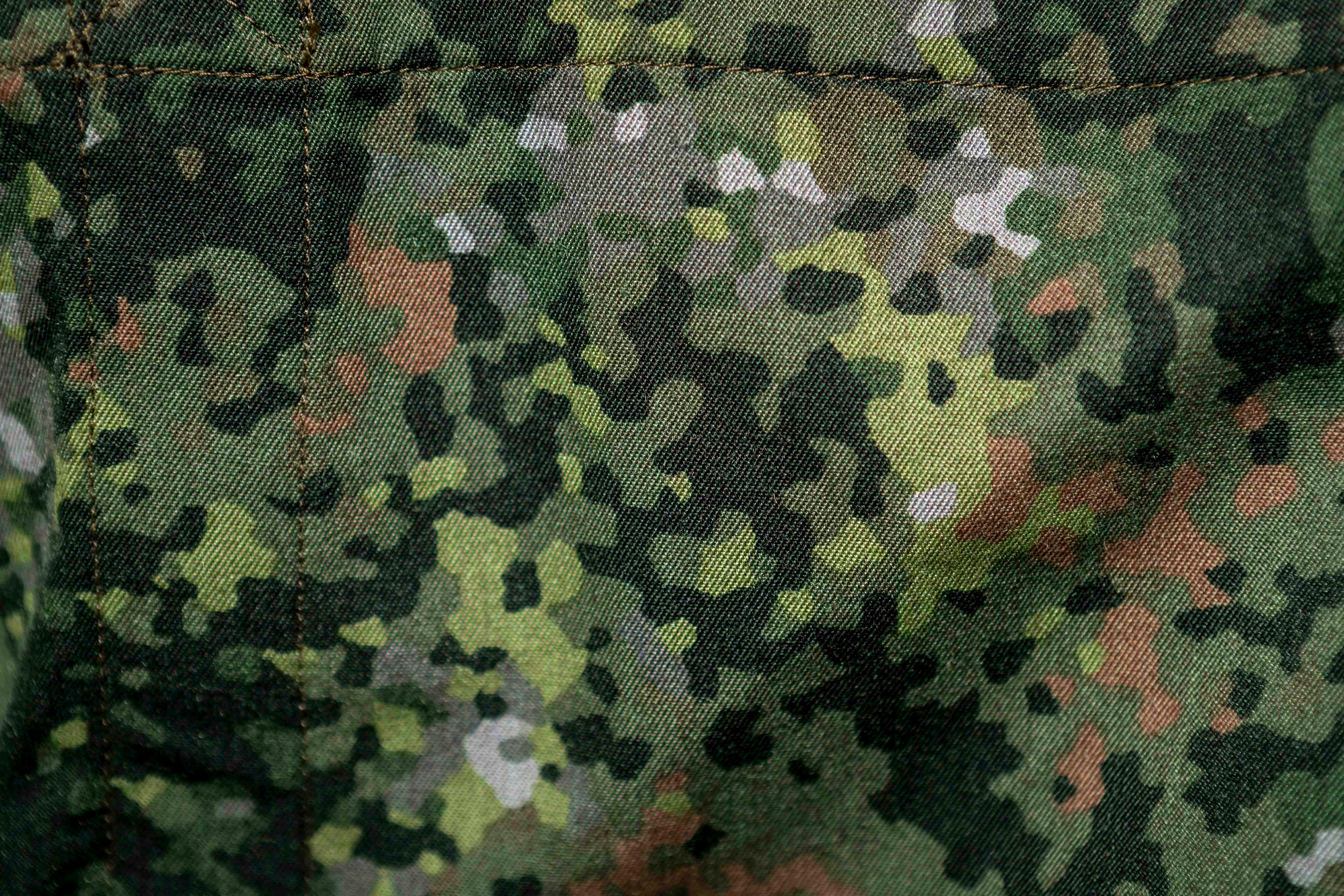
- NFP-Green variant
- Type: Military camouflage pattern
- Place of origin: Netherlands

Service history
- In service: 2019 - present
- Used by: See Users
- Wars: Resolute Support Mission in Operation Freedom's Sentinel

Production history
- Designer: Netherlands Organisation for Applied Scientific Research (TNO) and the Dutch Ministry of Defence
- Designed: 2008
- Manufacturer: Carrington Textiles
- Produced: 2014-Present
- No. produced: 13,500 sets (For first delivery)
- Variants: See Variants

The Netherlands Fractal Pattern (NFP) was developed as a collaboration project between the Netherlands Organisation for Applied Scientific Research (TNO) and the Dutch Ministry of Defence in order to replace all the camouflage patterns in use by the Dutch military.

== History ==
In 2008, research and development into a new camouflage pattern began with five patterns being analyzed, consisting of fractal, desert, woodland, urban and universal. Later on, eight patterns were being studied for potential adoption, which includes universal, multicamo for use in more than one environment and the others are terrain-based patterns. The criteria being used for the adoption of a new pattern must show its effectiveness, the psychological effect on the user and its uniqueness and distinctiveness from other camouflage patterns being used by other countries for consideration to adopt the pattern in Dutch military service. According to Ben Vlasman, head of the Joint Soldier Systems Knowledge Centre (Dutch: Joint Kenniscentrum Militair & Uitrusting), the NFP was made in order to be made recognizable to the public aside from the military.

The NFP was first sighted publicly in 2009 in Army Day events. It was reported in 2011 that NFM was offering combat clothing made with NFP camo pattern. In 2012, a solicitation was made for manufacturers to make the NFP in combat uniforms. Among the requirements made were for the clothes to be made with pattern while using 180 grams of Flame Retardant fabric with insect repellent qualities and an initial delivery of 13,500 sets in the first year in NFP Green.

In 2013, it was reported that some operators with Korps Commandotroepen's 104 Commando Company (Dutch: 104 Commandotroepencompagnie) were wearing NFP camos during anti-terrorist exercises in Israel.

The Dutch newspaper De Telegraaf reported that the NFP was adopted into service on October 26, 2014. At the time, the Netherlands Marine Corps was using U.S. Woodland uniforms, but they are expected to eventually phase NFP into service as well. The pattern was officially issued to the 4th Company of the combined German-Dutch 414 Tank Battalion during ILÜ LandOp 2019. These were in tanker coveralls. The rest of the Dutch military will be issued the NFP throughout 2020.

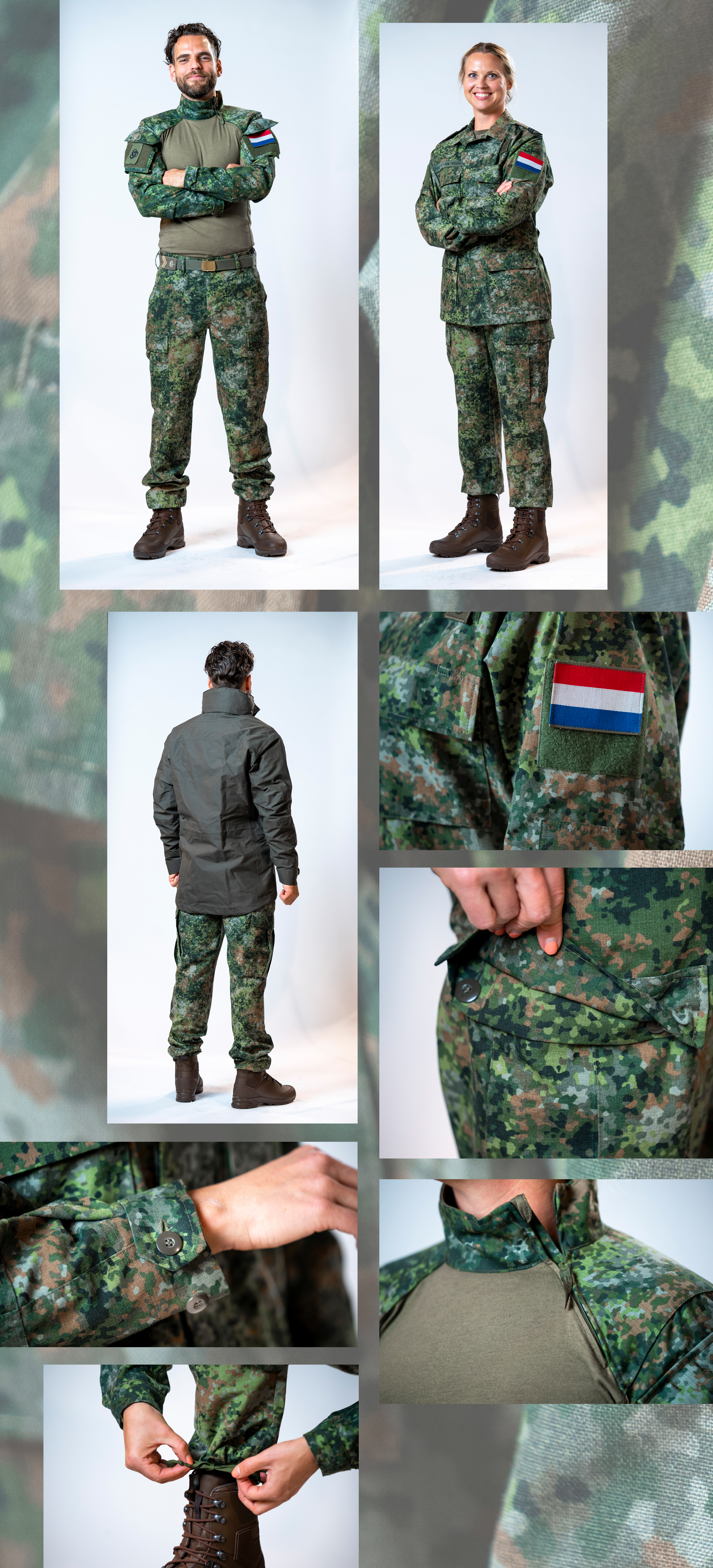
The interim uniform in NFP, based on the Dutch marines' combat uniform

With the adoption of the Revision Baltskin Viper P6N ballistic helmets in 2019 with a full fielding expected by 2022, issued green helmets with the Dutch Army will have issued NFP Green/Tan helmet covers.

During Enforce Tac 19, numerous manufacturers like Berghaus and Marom Dolphin, the latter for their Fusion load carrying system under the Improved Operational Soldier System (IOSS) (Dutch: Verbeterd Operationeel Soldaten Systeem) (VOSS), offered military gear with NFP camo pattern as an option. The VOSS in NFP camo was also on display at the NEDS exhibition in Rotterdam on November 28, 2019.

The first use of the NFP in combat operations was with Dutch troops operating under Resolute Support Mission in Afghanistan in January 2020.

On August 10, 2020, it was announced that full adoption of the NFP was pushed back from the intended 2023 deadline due to a contract dispute. Dutch forces will continue to use Multicam camo uniforms as an interim solution if deployed outside of the Netherlands in contingency areas.

In 2021, it's reported that the Belgian Navy adopted the naval camouflage variant.

On September 20, 2022, it's reported that half a million of Dutch troops will use NFP-based uniforms made by Carrington Textiles under Dutch specifications.

In April 2024, the Dutch Ministry of Defence announced that NFP-based raingear will be issued in NFP Multitone.

== Design ==
The design of the NFP has the fractals made with irregular shaped spots and no square pixels. The pattern's design involved the use of photographs of various backgrounds in various theatres of operations. The fractals in the pattern would be used to confuse and disorient someone when looking at them. In an issue of Ontdek je vlekje dated in April 2019, the research work on the NFP took more than 10 years to develop. It's suggested by Sjef van Gaalen that the NFP's development is a form of Dutch national identity due to the unique fractal camo created by TNO.

The pattern will see its use with combat gear under the Defense Operational Clothing System (DOCS) (Dutch: Defensie Operationeel Kleding Systeem) (DOKS) and the VOSS under the Individual Soldier System (Dutch: Individueel Soldaat Systeem) (ISS), which was established to replace combat gear adopted in the 1990s.

=== Colours ===
The colors used in NFP Green consist of Light Grey, Grey, Russet Brown, Grey-brown, Pea Green, Olive Green, Bottle Green, and a near-black Dark Green.

The colors used in NFP Tan consist of Stone, Light Earth, Dark Earth, Light Olive, Olive Drab, Bottle Green and Dark Chocolate.

For NFP Multitone, the colors used include Light Earth, Dark Earth, Light Green and Bottle Green.

== Variants ==
NFP has been developed with the following variants being created/researched:

- NFP Green: Used for operations in woods and urban areas in Europe.
- NFP Tan: For desert/arid terrain.
- NFP Multitone: Has few colors and more contrast in colors from NFP Green/Tan, which is meant for green and dry terrain. The pattern is currently used for field gear and actively being distributed.
- NFP Navy: For personnel operating in navy vessels. Currently distributed.
- NFP Arctic: For winter operations in the mountains. Currently being considered.
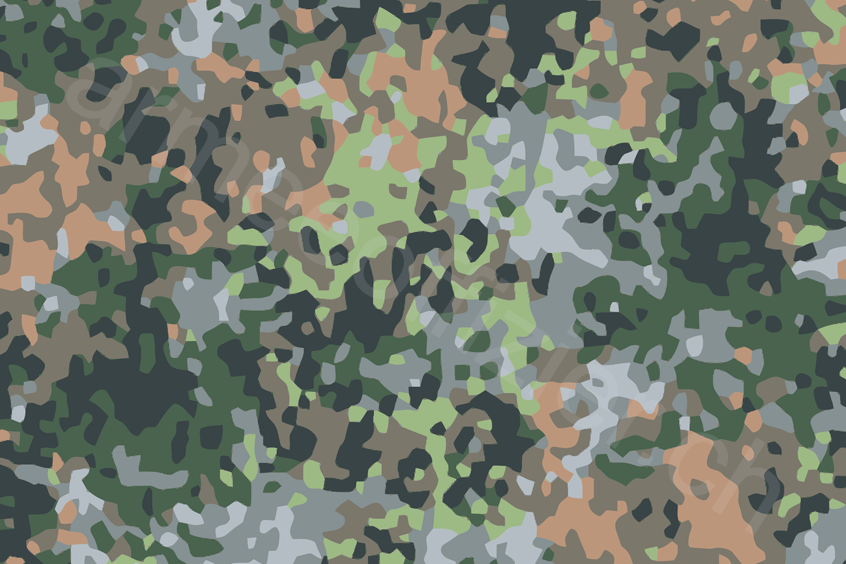
NFP-Green

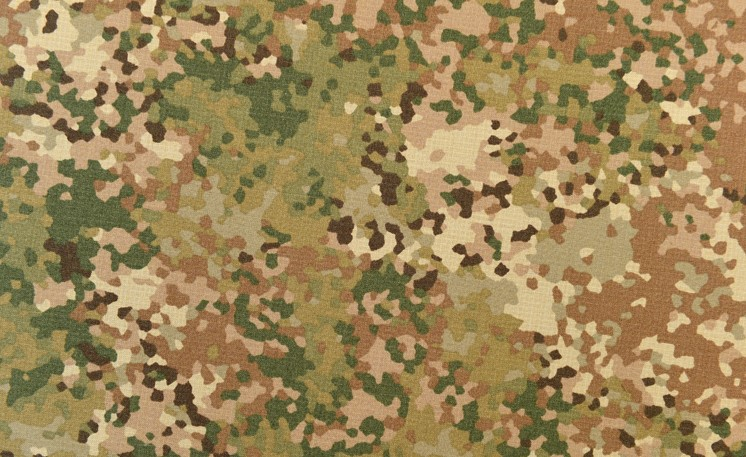
NFP-Tan

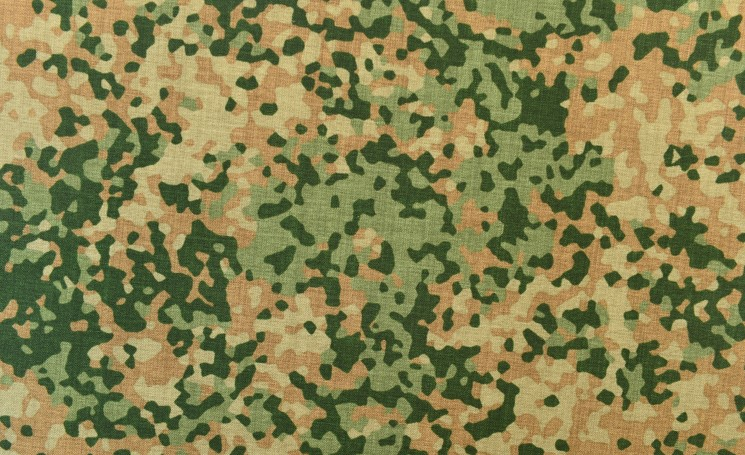
NFP-Multi

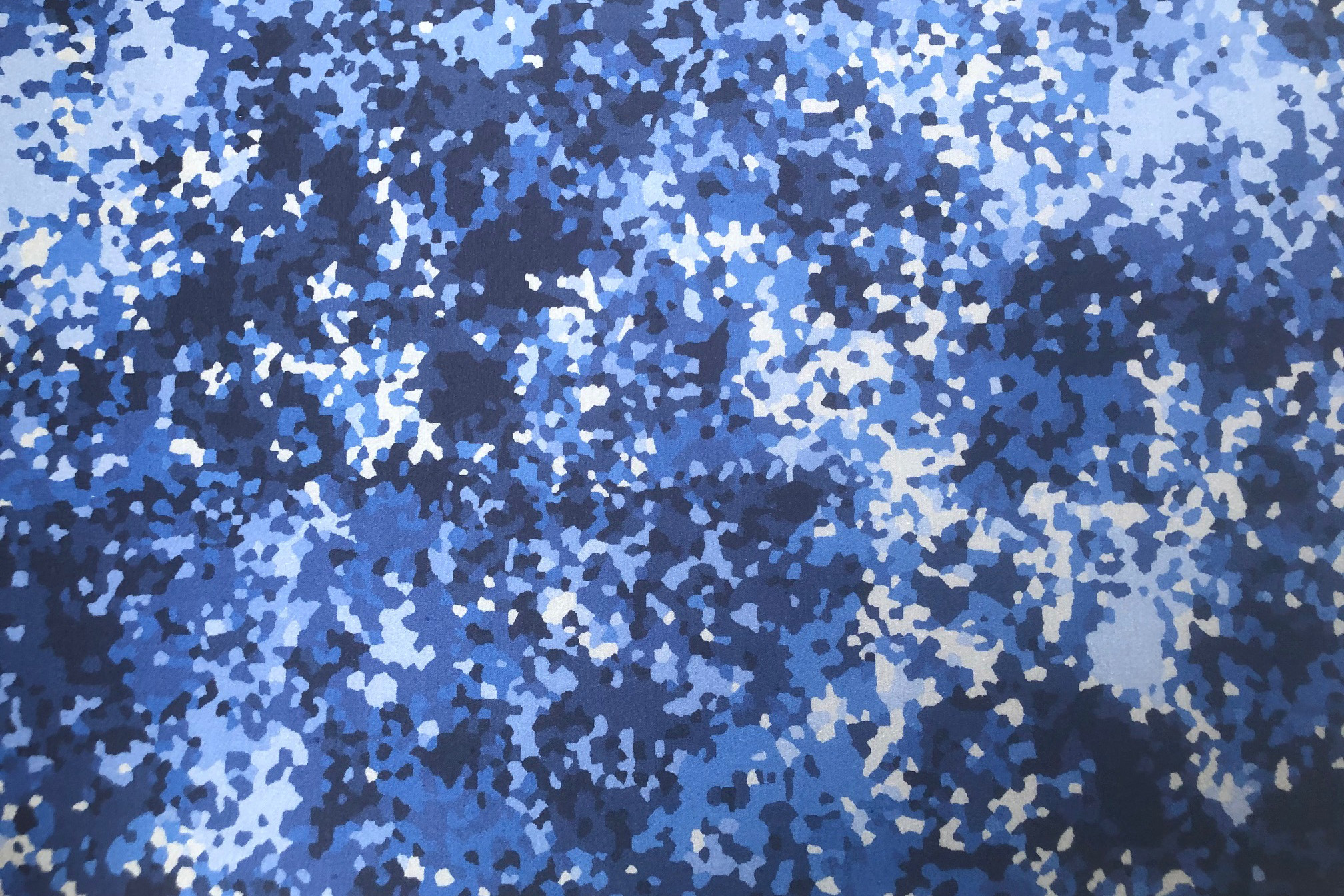
NFP-Navy

== Users ==
- Belgium: The Belgian Navy has participated in the DOCS project to secure the NFP Navy pattern for its personnel from 2021 onwards.
- Netherlands: For the Dutch military.
