= Dienst Speciale Interventies =

Dutch elite police unit

Special Intervention Service
- Dienst Speciale Interventies (Dutch)
- Emblem of the DSI
- Active: 1 July 2006 – present
- Country: Netherlands
- Agency: National Police Corps
- Type: Police tactical unit
- Role: Counter-terrorism; Law enforcement
- Headquarters: Driebergen, Utrecht, Netherlands
- Motto: Praeparatus Esto; Be Prepared
- Abbreviation: DSI

Structure
- Personnel: c. 600

Commanders
- Current commander: Commissioner Rienk de Groot

Notables
- Significant operation(s): Utrecht tram shooting

The Dienst Speciale Interventies (Special Intervention Service), commonly abbreviated DSI, is the elite police tactical unit of the Dutch National Police Corps and was formally established on 1 July 2006. The DSI is tasked with neutralizing terrorist incidents and other violent public order disruptions for which regular police units are inadequately equipped. In total, the DSI consists of about 600 active personnel.

Since the integration of the regional Arrest Teams (Arrestatieteams, AT's), in 2013, the DSI functions as an umbrella organization coordinating the operations of both the ATs and the counter-terrorism elements. The mixed unit has a unique character as it consists of both law enforcement and military personnel.

== History ==
Since the regional Arrest Teams of the police were incorporated into the DSI in 2013, multiple units with an independent history have resided under a joint command. Therefore, a distinction should be made between the respective histories of the Special Support Units (Bijzondere Bijstandseenheid, BBE) and the Arrest Teams (Arrestatieteams, AT's).

=== Special Support Units ===
In 1973, the first Dutch counter-terrorist unit was established under the name Special Support Unit-Marines (Bijzondere Bijstandseenheid Mariniers, BBE-M). The unit was established in response to the Munich massacre, and the rising threat of terrorism throughout Europe. The members of the new unit were recruited from the Netherlands Marine Corps. In 2005, the BBE-M was renamed to Unit Intervention Marines (UIM), and was once again renamed to M-Squadron with the creation of NLMARSOF in 2013.

Following the establishment of the BBE-M, two additional units consisting of snipers were founded: the Special Support Unit-Police (Bijzondere Bijstandseenheid Politie, BBE-P) and the Special Support Unit-Military (Bijzondere Bijstandseenheid Krijgsmacht, BBE-K). Personnel of the BBE-P was recruited from the police, while personnel of the BBE-K was recruited from the Netherlands armed forces. With the establishment of the DSI, the two units were merged into the Unit Expertise and Operational Support (Afdeling Expertise & Operationele Ondersteuning, AE&OO).

In addition, the Special Support Unit-Rapid Intervention Unit (BBE-Snelle Interventie Eenheid, BBE-SIE) was created. The BBE-SIE consisted of both law enforcement and military personnel and functioned as a rapidly deployable counter-terrorist unit. The tasks of the BBE-SIE were transferred to the Unit Intervention with the establishment of the DSI.

=== Arrest Teams ===
During the end of the 1960s an operational need developed for units capable of handling the increasingly violent organized crime. In 1969, the municipal police of the city of Arnhem founded the Special Missions Unit. Several districts of the Rijkspolitie established comparable units. In 1973, one of the units was labeled Arrestatieteam (Arrest Team, AT). This development led to the creation of the first comprehensive AT training courses within the Rijkspolitie in 1978. Consequently, the Ministry of Justice and Security and the Ministry of the Interior wrote legislation which corroborated the founding of four ATs within the Rijkspolitie, and six ATs within the municipal police forces of the large cities. The legislation included regulation which stated that the ATs could be deployed exclusively for the arrest of suspects known for illegal gun possession, while requiring permission of the public prosecutor as well.

With the reorganisation of the Dutch police in 1994, the ATs of both the Rijkspolitie and municipal police were restructured to form six interregional ATs. In addition, the AT of the Brigade Speciale Beveiligingsopdrachten (BSB) of the Royal Marechaussee was incorporated as well.

=== Establishment and development ===
The DSI was established in 2006 to improve the joint deployments of the several police tactical units. Points of improvement became apparent after the problematic siege of a house in The Hague which was part of operations aimed at the arrest of terrorists belonging to the Hofstad Network.

To prevent these situations, the DSI unified law enforcement and military tasks in one organisation. The goal of this unification was to increase both interoperability and efficiency, and to combine the specialisations of both the police and the military. Following a confidential experts report, the Second Balkenende cabinet decided to implement a revision of the Bijzondere Bijstandseenheid, the spearhead counter-terrorism unit at the time. The DSI unofficially commenced operations in 2005, the formal establishment took place on 1 July 2006, and was at that time part of the National police services agency.

In 2007 a report surfaced that found that the DSI suffered from personnel shortages. This shortage was partly caused by a relatively large outflow of personnel. Personnel leaving the service often stated that a lack of deployments was the main reason for their departure. The government commission tasked with evaluating the effectiveness, however, found that the general consensus was that the service functioned in a good manner. The commission was enthusiastic about the cooperation among police and military personnel.

With the establishment of the National Police Corps in 2013 the regular Arrest Teams were placed under the command of the DSI.

Following the Charlie Hebdo terrorist attack in 2015, the need arose for a flexible and mobile teams of special forces in the Netherlands. Subsequently, the Rapid Response Teams (RRTs) were established. The RRTs consist of both police and military personnel. Additionally, the DSI received a considerable and structural budget increase. The DSI currently has an annual budget of approximately €70,3 million.

== Selection and training ==
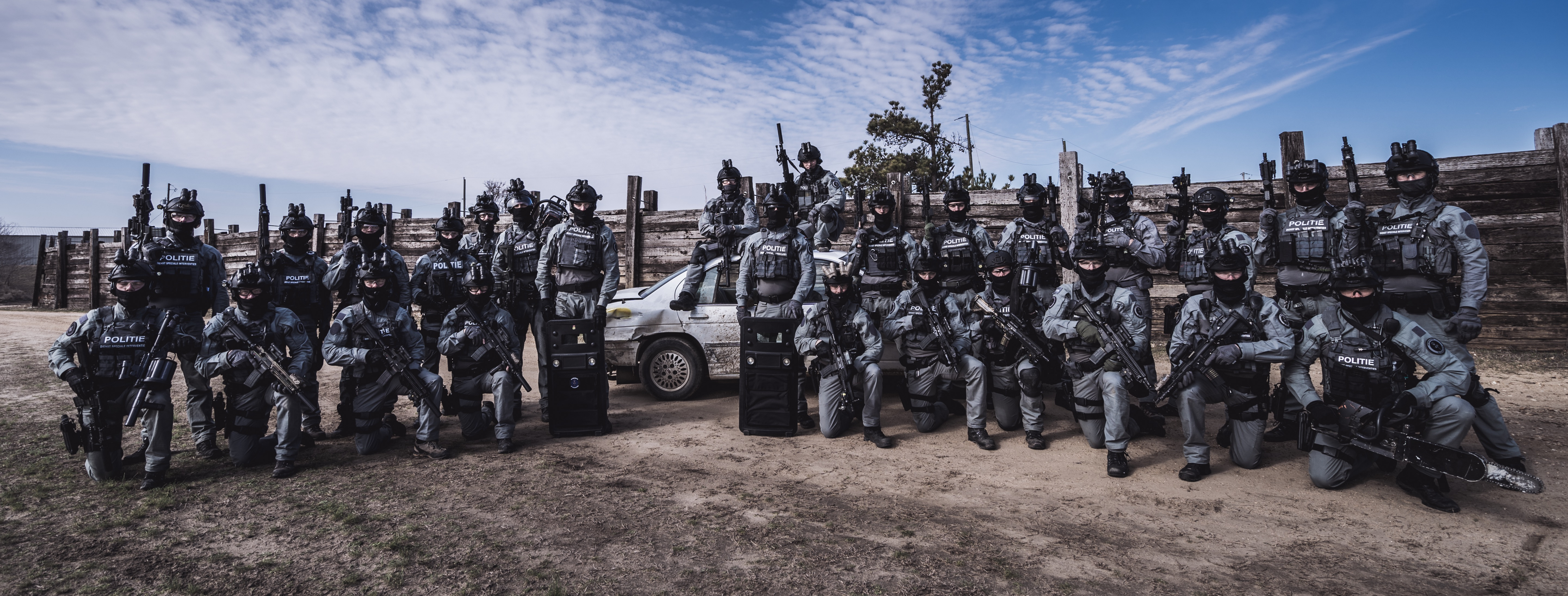
DSI (AI, AE&OO and M-Squadron) operators during training in Arkansas, United States.

The first courses for the Arrest Teams took place in 1978 under the command of the Rijkspolitie. In 1979, the ministers of Justice and the minister of the Interior, established four Arrest Teams under the command of the national police (Rijkspolitie), and six Arrest Teams under the command of the municipal police forces (Gemeentepolitie) of the six largest cities.

Since the re-organization of the Dutch police in 1994, all aspiring AT personnel attend the same basic training at the police academy. The training takes place in several locations throughout the country and takes a total of twenty weeks in which aspiring AT-operators are trained extensively in shooting, house clearing, de-escalation and an extensive specialized driving course. Marines of M-Squadron that are detached to Unit Intervention undergo the complete AT-training as well. Because of the strict psychological, social and physical selection of the operators, the intense course, frequent training, and high-quality equipment, DSI personnel are well equipped to deploy in highly challenging situations. The extensive training enables the operators to arrest suspects with as little violence as possible.

Additionally, all DSI operators develop a specialism. Individual AT operators are free to pass on their specialism of choice to their superiors. Personnel can choose the following specialisms:

- Diving: divers of the DSI are regularly deployed to search for and secure evidence (for example firearms) and to assist forensic experts.
- High altitude operations: high altitude operators are trained to operate on high altitudes for counter-terrorism, arrest and rescue operations.
- Medic: medics are trained and responsible for providing first aid and frontline trauma care during operations.
- Demolition expert: demolition expert are specialized in the use of explosives. Explosives are regularly used during operations for door breaching.
- Motorcyclist: motorcyclists within the DSI are trained to operate on and from unmarked police motorcycles. Motorcycles are used by the DSI to arrest suspects moving on foot and for interventions at locations that are otherwise difficult to access.
- Firearm instructor: firearm instructors provide firearm training and instructions for the several weapon systems in use within the DSI.
- K-9 handler: the DSI has multiple police dogs at their disposal. These dogs are used for both arrests and reconnaissances. DSI dogs often stay with their respective handlers after their working life.

== Organisation ==
The DSI consist of four departments:

=== Arrest Teams ===
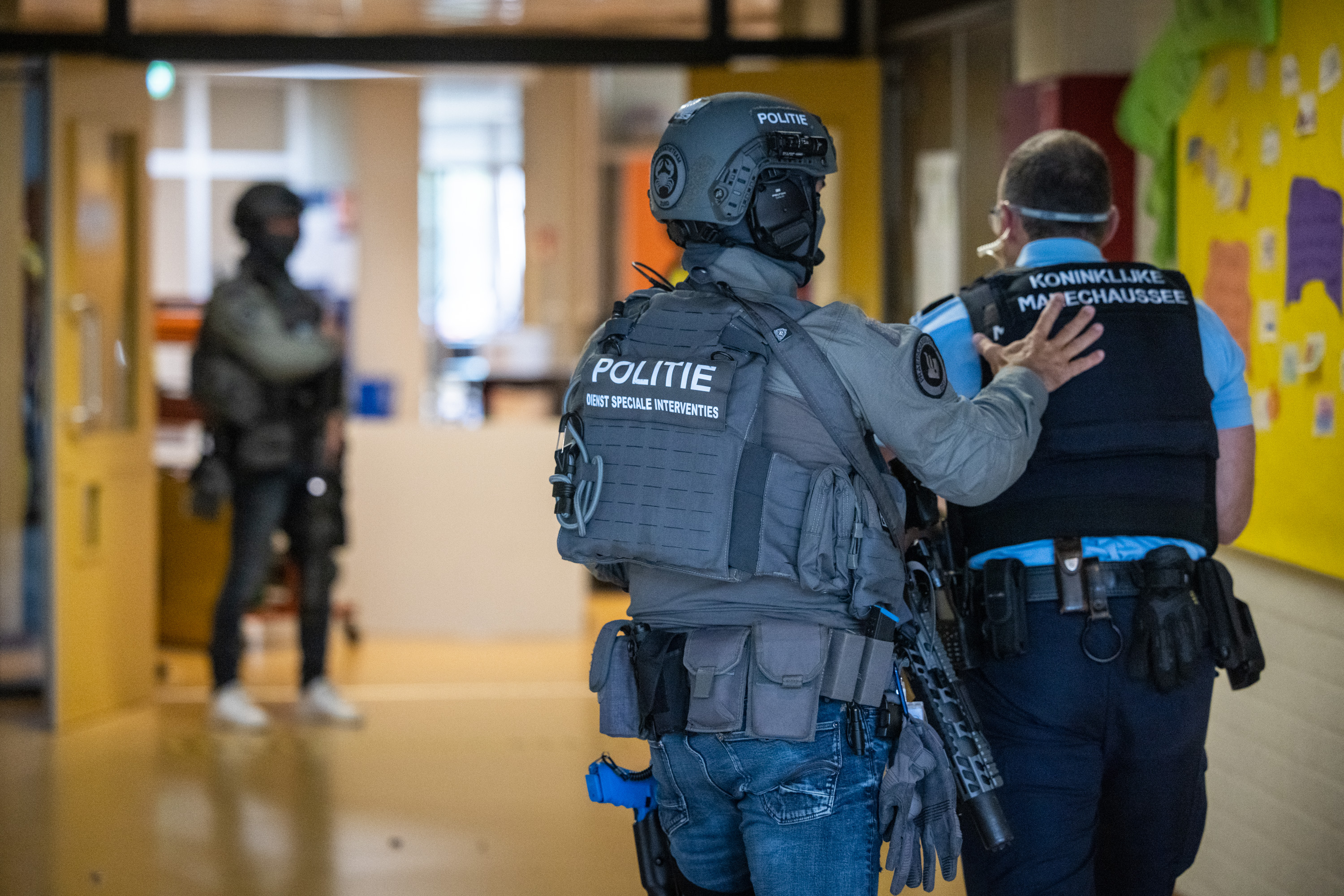
AT operators during an exercise with the Royal Marechaussee

The Arrest and Support Teams Department (Dutch: Afdeling Arrestatie- en Ondersteuningteams, A-AOT) has six regional ATs residing under its command: AT North East (Noord-Oost), AT The Hague (Den Haag), AT South (Zuid), AT Amsterdam, AT Centre (Midden) and AT Rotterdam. While each team has their own area of responsibility, the teams are interchangeable and can be deployed outside of their respective regions throughout all of the Netherlands. In addition to the police ATs, the AT of the Brigade Speciale Beveiligingsopdrachten (BSB) of the Royal Marechaussee, is provided to the DSI and partakes in all operations as well due to the complete interoperability. An AT consists of one Team Commander, four Section Commanders, the team operators and administrative personnel.

The primary task of the Arrest Teams is to conduct the arrests of high-risk individuals, for which regular police personnel is inadequately trained and equipped. The planned AT cases are often the final chapter of a criminal investigation. In addition to the execution of planned raids, ATs can respond to ad hoc cases such as terrorist incidents or disturbed persons. For example, the DSI allocates AT operators to the Rapid Response Teams (RRTs). The RRTs patrol the large cities and specific high-risk locations throughout the Netherlands on a 24/7 basis, and each consist of three AT operators in an armoured vehicle. The RRTs are the first DSI unit on-scene of a violent (terrorist) incident. Working as an operator within one of the ATs is a full-time job. When operators are not working AT cases or RRT shifts, they are training their physical fitness, techniques and procedures and their respective team specialisation.

AOT	Garrison	Callsign
North East (Noord Oost)	Zwolle	NO
The Hague (Den Haag)	The Hague	DH
South (Zuid)	Eindhoven	ZD
Amsterdam	Amsterdam	AD
Centre (Midden)	Utrecht	MN
Rotterdam	Rotterdam	RD
BSB	Soesterberg	BSB

=== Intervention Department ===
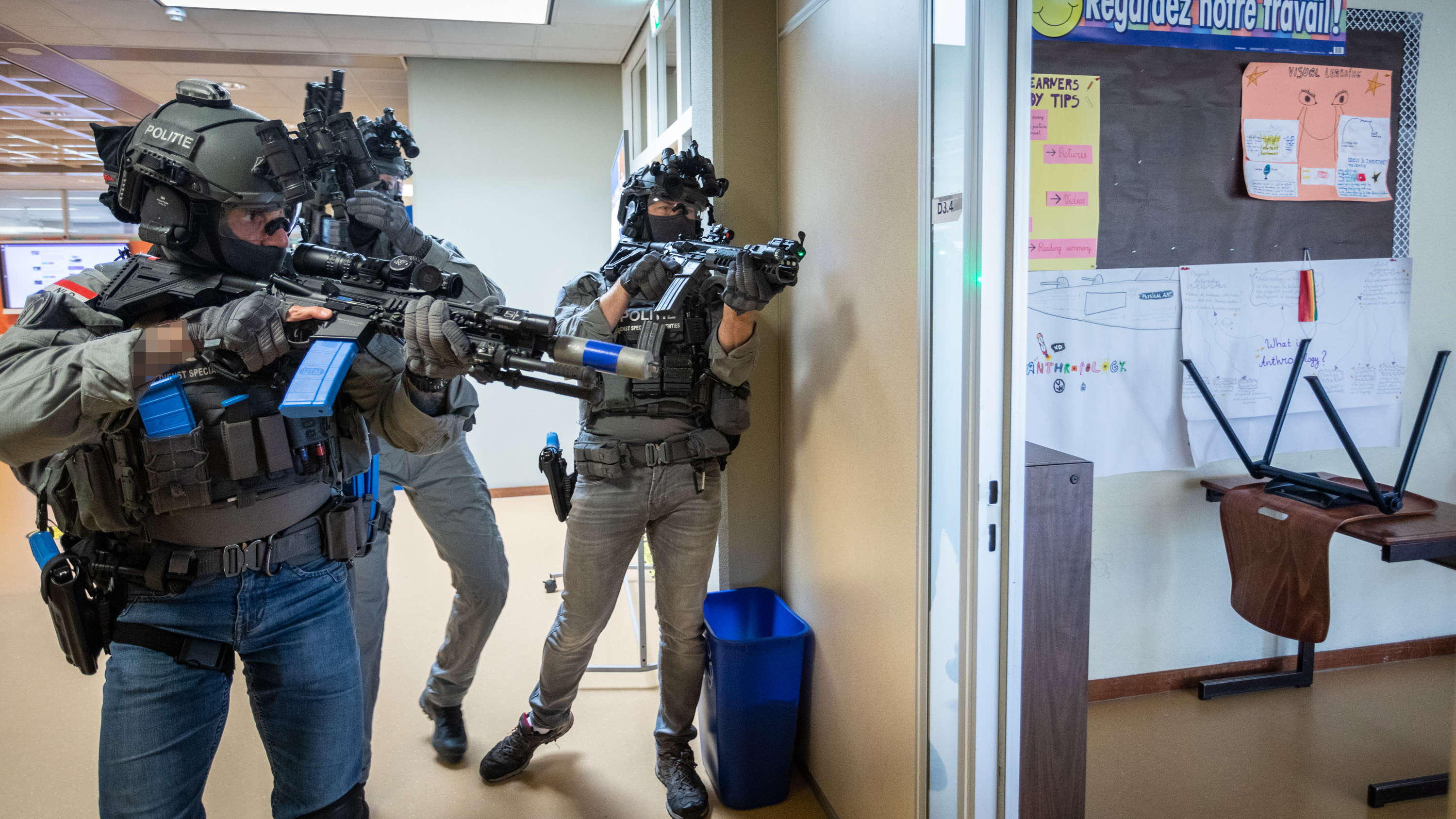
Intervention Department operators armed with HK416 and SIG MCX rifles during training

The Intervention Department (Dutch: Afdeling Interventie, AI) is a mixed unit consisting of both law enforcement and military operators, which main tasks are to conduct the arrest of terror suspects and organised crime figures, and to neutralise ongoing terror attacks. The mixed unit consist of approximately one third operators of M-Squadron (NLMARSOF) and the Korps Commandotroepen, one third operators of the police ATs and one third AT operators of the BSB. Operators of these units are attached to the Intervention Department for a period of time and are required to complete the AT and National Intervention Course beforehand.

In addition to the planned raids the unit conducts, the AI maintains several strategically located operating bases for the Quick Reaction Force {QRF). The QRFs consist of robust teams of Intervention Department operators – these teams are larger, more heavily equipped and contain more specialists (such as snipers) than the Rapid Response Teams. The QRF teams are on-call 24/7 and respond to actual instances of terrorist incidents or other violent cases that require an intervention. Moreover, the Intervention Department can use the Quick Reaction Air (QRA) concept, which provides the DSI with three AgustaWestland AW139 helicopters of the Dienst Luchtvaartpolitie, to allow for a quick response time throughout the country.

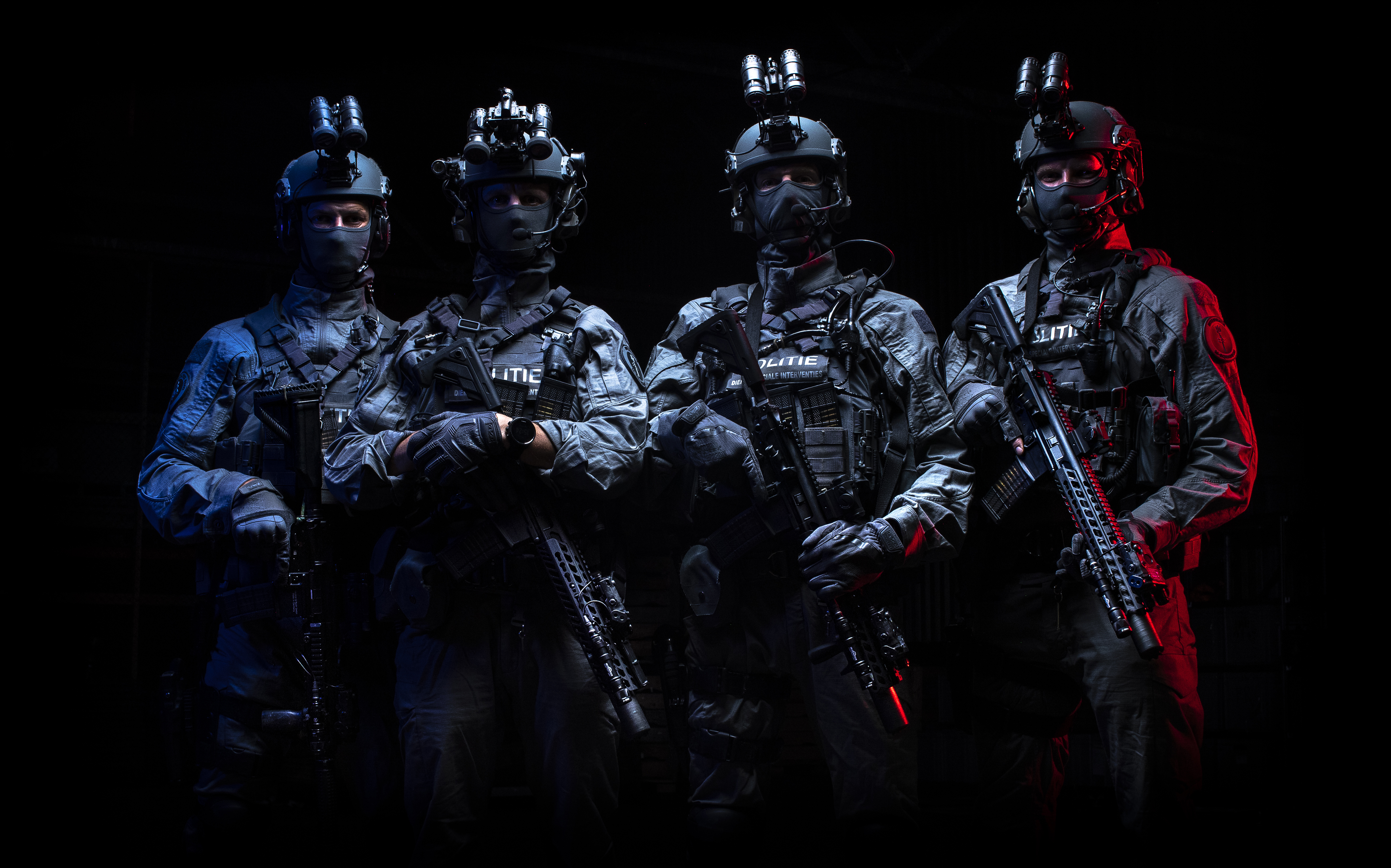
M-Squadron operators wear the same distinctive grey uniforms as the other DSI units

=== Expertise and Operational Support Department ===
The Expertise and Operational Support Department (Dutch: Afdeling Expertise & Operationele Ondersteuning, AE&OO) provides operational support to all units within the DSI. This includes police negotiators, snipers and technical experts (e.g. drone operators).

=== M-Squadron ===
M-Squadron is part of NLMARSOF, the special operations forces of the Netherlands Marine Corps, and is formally not part of the DSI. However, during national deployments M-Squadron operates under the command of the DSI. M-Squadron is the tip of the spear counterterrorist unit in the Netherlands and tasked with conducting large-scale, prolonged and complex interventions, such as ships, oil platforms, trains and airliners. As a marine unit, M-Squadron has extensive expertise in maritime environments.

== Equipment ==
=== Personal equipment ===
DSI patch as worn by all operators

While the various DSI units all have specific equipment for their respective tasks, some personal equipment can be seen with all units. All operators that are active within the DSI wear the same grey uniforms and equipment, and wear the 'Politie' patch on their chests and backs, this applies to military personnel as well. The choice for the colour grey has multiple reasons. The predominant reason is to advance the image of the DSI and to increase esprit de corps. Moreover, the DSI can be easily distinguished from other specialised law enforcement tactical units while the grey gear also complicates police impersonation. Lastly, the colour grey signifies the character of a mixed unit, situated between the 'blue' (law enforcement) and 'green' (military) worlds.

Each DSI operator is provided with a ballistic helmet, model Ulbrichts Zenturio, which is fitted with an armoured glass visor that can withstand multiple 9mm rounds. In addition, all operators are provided with a lightweight Ops-Core FAST SF Super High Cut helmet that enables more freedom of movement and situational awareness. Furthermore, DSI operators are given a heavy bulletproof vest as well as a lighter plate carrier (model First Spear AAC). Much of the DSI's personal equipment is customised and/or tailor-made for the service's specific needs and requirements. All operators are trained to use night-vision goggles, the DSI fields PVS-31 and GPNVG-18 goggles. Pointmen have access to multiple types of ballistic shields.

=== Weapons ===
Weapons in use include, among others:

Name	Origin	Type	Cartridge	Image	Details
Taser X2	United States	Electroshock weapon	Electrodes		Issued to Arrest Teams, used to incapacitate suspect using an electroshock.
Glock 17	Austria	Semi-automatic pistol	9×19mm Parabellum		Standard issue pistol within DSI. Fitted with a laser light module.
Mossberg 590	United States	Pump-action shotgun	12 gauge		Used with bean bag munition to incapacitate suspects, and with buckshot for door breaching.
Heckler & Koch MP5	Germany	Submachine gun	9×19mm Parabellum		Fitted with optics and a laser light module. Largely phased out and exclusively used for training purposes.
FN P90	Belgium	Personal defense weapon	FN 5.7×28mm		Fitted with a suppressor, optics and a laser light module. Exclusively used by M-Squadron.
Heckler & Koch MP7	Germany	Personal defense weapon	HK 4.6×30mm		Fitted with a suppressor, optics and a laser light module.
HK416A5	Germany	Assault rifle	5.56×45mm NATO		Fitted with a suppressor, optics and a laser light module.
Heckler & Koch G28	Germany	Designated marksman rifle	7.62×51mm NATO		Fitted with a telescopic sight, 45º red dot sight, laser rangefinder, folding stock and suppressor.
Heckler & Koch HK417A2	Germany	Battle rifle	7.62×51mm NATO		Fitted with a telescopic sight, laser rangefinder and suppressor.
SIG MCX	United States	Assault rifle	.300 AAC Blackout		Fitted with the SIG Sauer Suppressed Upper Receiver (SUR), an integral suppressor. In addition, it is fitted with a Magpul stock, SIG Sauer optics and a laser light module.
Sako TRG M10	Finland	Sniper rifle	.338 Lapua Magnum		Fitted with a telescopic sight and various other accessories, exclusively used by snipers of AE&OO.
Milkor MGL	South Africa	Grenade launcher	40 mm grenade		Fitted with an optic.

=== Vehicles ===
The DSI use armoured versions of civilian vehicles to perform their tasks. During on-call duties, during which operators are available for 24 hours, DSI personnel have access to a personal service car. All DSI personnel attend a multiple week specialised driving course. Operators learn to maneuver the vehicle in a quick and safe manner. In addition, the impact of the additional weight of the armour on the driving characteristics are addressed. Furthermore, car procedures are trained to subdue suspects in cars. The DSI has access to a large and diverse car fleet:

==== Armoured civilian cars ====
- Audi A4
- Audi A6
- Audi Q7
- BMW 3-series
- BMW 5-series
- BMW X5
- Mercedes-Benz C-Class
- Mercedes-Benz E-Class
- Mercedes-Benz GLE
- Mercedes-Benz Sprinter
- Mercedes-Benz Vito
- Skoda Superb
- Toyota Land Cruiser
- Volkswagen Passat
- Volkswagen Transporter
- Volvo S60

==== Armoured personnel carriers ====
The DSI fleet includes multiple armoured personnel carriers (APCs). Lenco BearCats and Lenco Bears are deployed during high risk interventions, certain firearm incidents, and large scale terrorist attacks. A number of vehicles are fitted with the Mobile Adjustable Ramp System or Articulating Ramp Conversion, produced by the American firm PATRIOT3. This system uses hydraulic ramps to enable raids at high altitudes. For potential aircraft hijacking, the DSI has access to multiple YPR-765 Aircraft Assault Vehicles of the Royal Marechaussee, a tracked light armored vehicle that is fitted with steps and ramps at airplane height.

==== Motorcycles ====
Multiple motorcycles are in use within the DSI. Predominantly KTM and BMW motorcycles are used.

==== Helicopters ====
Three AgustaWestland AW139 helicopters Dienst Luchtvaartpolitie are available for the Quick Reaction Air (QRA) to respond to incidents that require a larger presence of personnel.
