= Netherlands Maritime Special Operations Forces =

Maritime special forces of the Netherlands

Netherlands Maritime Special Operations Forces NLMARSOF
- Nederlandse Maritieme Special Operations Forces
- Emblem of NLMARSOF
- Active: 2013–present
- Country: Netherlands
- Branch: Royal Netherlands Navy
- Type: Special forces
- Role: Counter-terrorism; Direct action Military assistance Special reconnaissance Hostage rescue
- Part of: Netherlands Marine Corps
- Garrison/HQ: Doorn and Den Helder
- Mottos: Nec timide, nec tumide ("Without fear, without overconfidence")
- Website: Official website

Insignia
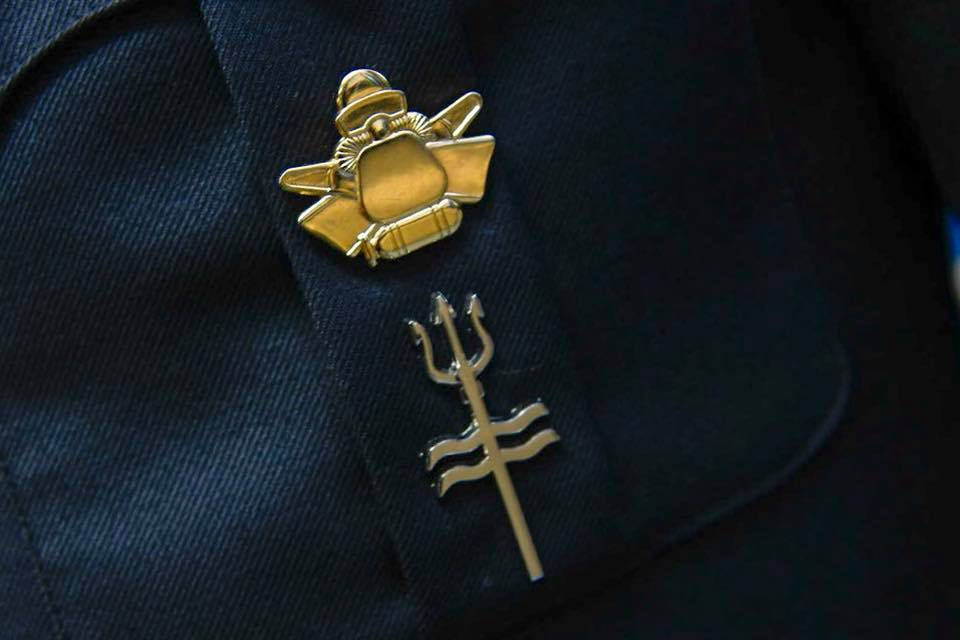
- Frogman insignia and NLMARSOF-trident
- Abbreviation: NLMARSOF

The Netherlands Maritime Special Operations Forces (NLMARSOF, also simply referred to as MARSOF) is the special forces unit of the Marine Corps of the Royal Netherlands Navy. It is one of the three principal units tasked with special operations in the Netherlands (the other being the Korps Commandotroepen and 300SQN). The unit can be deployed worldwide to conduct special operations, including counter-terrorism both overseas and domestically, with a maritime focus. Its operations are planned and coordinated by the Netherlands Special Operations Command (NLD SOCOM).

The unit was created in 2013 with the merger of the Unit Interventie Mariniers (UIM) and the Maritime Special Operations (MSO)-company.

== History ==
Until 2008, the Dutch maritime special forces capability consisted of three distinct units: the Dutch Frogmen Platoon, the Mountain Leader Reconnaissance Troop, and the Unit Interventie Mariniers. The Dutch Frogmen Platoon has historically had a strong connection with the United Kingdom's Special Boat Service, and was informally often named "7th Troop SBS". The Mountain Leader Reconnaissance Troop (ML Recce Troop), was established in 1990 and modelled after the Brigade Patrol Troop of the United Kingdom's Royal Marines. The Unit Interventie Mariniers (UIM), named Bijzondere Bijstandseenheid (Special Support Unit) until 2006, was formed on 22 February 1973, in response to a rising threat of terrorist attacks in both Europe and domestically. The main goal of this unit is the countering of large scale and/or complex domestic terrorist attacks.

Since 2006 the operational command of UIM is executed by the Dienst Speciale Interventies (DSI) of the Dutch National Police. In 2008, the Dutch Frogmen Platoon and the ML Recce Troop merged into the Maritime Special Operations Company (MSO-Coy) and were tasked with all amphibious operations for the Royal Netherlands Navy. While commencing in an informal manner in 2009, since 2013 NLMARSOF was officially established as a new operational unit. The MSO-Coy was renamed Conventional-Squadron (C-Squadron), and is tasked with the full spectrum of special operations outside of the Netherlands.

UIM was renamed Maritime-Squadron (M-Squadron), and is dedicated to national counter-terrorism missions under operational command of the DSI. Training-Squadron (T-Squadron) will support both M-Squadron and C-Squadron, and is responsible for all training and the recruitment of new operators.

== Structure ==
NLMARSOF currently consists of three operational squadrons, and one dedicated operational support group:

- Conventional Squadron (C-Squadron): Tasked with executing the full spectrum of special operations outside of the Netherlands, with an emphasis on long-range reconnaissance patrols. Consists of conventional operators, Mountain Leaders and Frogmen.
- Maritime Counter-Terrorism Squadron (M-Squadron): Tasked with conducting domestic counter-terrorist operations under the command of the DSI. M-Squadron trains extensively on the neutralisation of complex terrorist attacks, for example on off-shore oil platforms.
- Training Squadron (T-Squadron): Tasked with training of both C- and M-Squadron and the recruitment of new personnel within the Netherlands Marine Corps ranks.
- Special Operation Forces Support Group (SOFSG): Tasked with providing operational support.
- Logistic Support Group (LSG): Tasked with providing maintenance, acquisition and storage of all equipment.

== Tasks ==
NLMARSOF carries out four main types of operations:

- Direct Action (DA): Conducting small-scale offensive operations such as raids, ambushes, and sabotage.
- Military Assistance (MA): Supplying military support to foreign military units. This support can consist of both providing training and providing assistance during actual operations.
- Special Reconnaissance (SR): Conducting special reconnaissance behind enemy lines, for example monitoring hostile troop movements, while avoiding direct contact with the enemy.
- Counter-terrorism (CT): Conducting both national and international counter terror operations, where NLMARSOF, compared to its army counterpart Korps Commandotroepen, emphasises training for operations in a maritime setting.

== Recruitment and training ==
All new personnel for NLMARSOF is recruited from within the Netherlands Marine Corps ranks, there is no possibility for civilians or military personnel from other branches to join NLMARSOF.

The training starts with a three-week pre-selection course, the Aptitude. Recruits must endure this pre-selection to qualify for the twenty-week MSOF-course, which will transform the recruits into NLMARSOF-operators. After the MSOF-course, all recruits must complete the fourteen-week Nationale Interventie Opleiding (National Intervention Course), which focuses on domestic counter-terrorist scenarios. The operators that have completed both of these courses are then fully operational to serve in M-Squadron. Operators bound for C-Squadron will have to complete the Mountain Leader or the twelve-week Frogmen course to obtain operational status within C-Squadron.

== Units ==
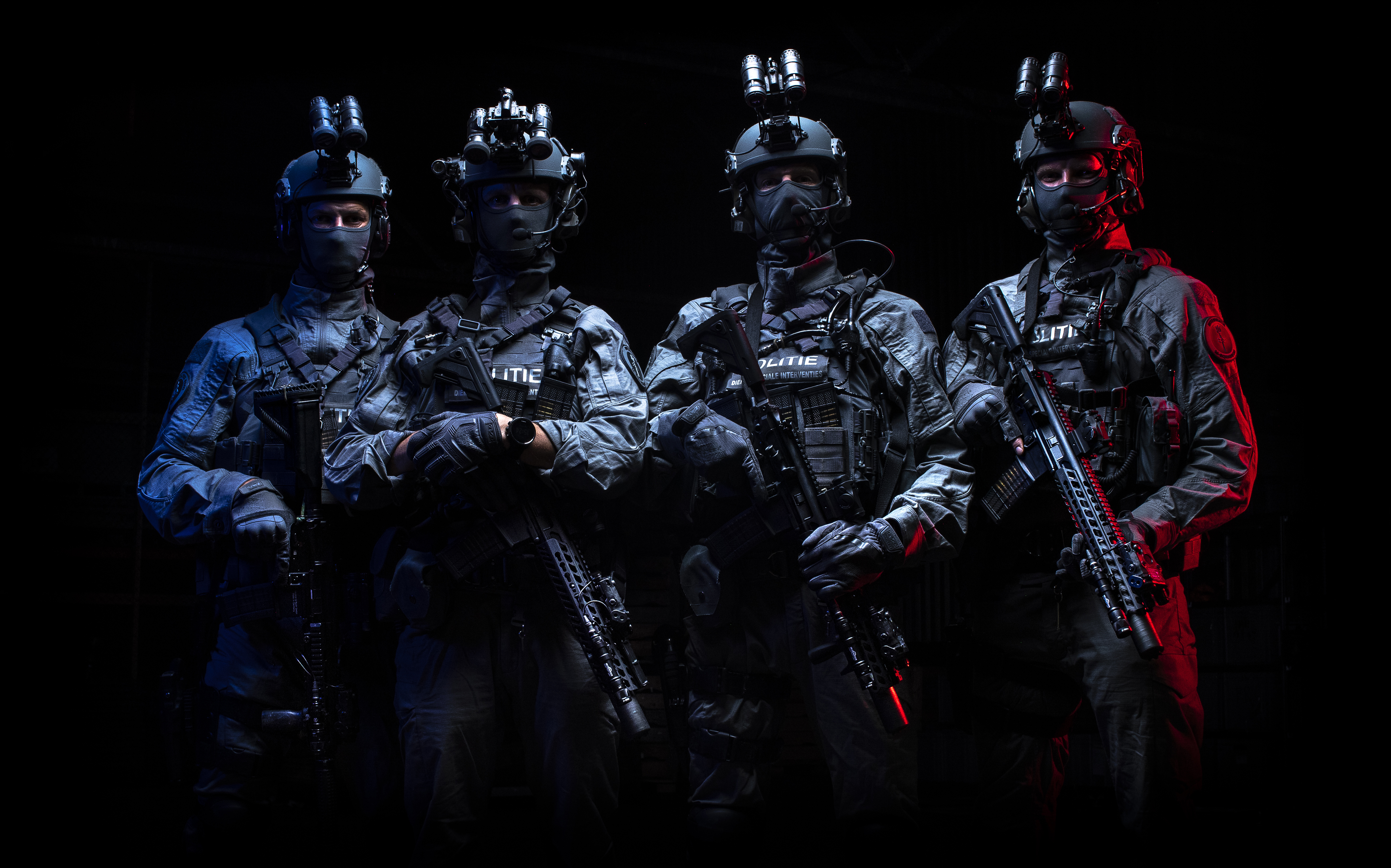
Members of M-Squadron in 2020

=== M-Squadron ===
M-Squadron was founded as the Bijzondere Bijstandseenheid (BBE, Special Support Unit) in 1972 and was the first dedicated counter-terrorism unit in the Netherlands. Its establishment was deemed necessary after a rise of the terrorist threat level in Europe, such as the Munich Massacre, and domestically, such as the terrorist attacks committed by Moluccans.

Domestic operations conducted by M-Squadron take place under the command of the Dienst Speciale Interventies (DSI) of the Dutch National Police since 2006. While the operational command resides with the DSI, M-Squadron continues to be an organisational unit of NLMARSOF and the Netherlands Marine Corps.

=== C-Squadron ===
C-Squadron conducts operations outside of the Netherlands and consists of regular NLMARSOF-operators that have completed the MSOF- and NIO-training, and operators that have completed the additional Mountain Leader and/or Frogmen training.

- The Mountain Leader troop consists of operators who have successfully completed the nine-month training provided by the Mountain Leader Training Cadre of the 3 Commando Brigade of the United Kingdom's Royal Marines. This intense course, which partly takes place in northern Norway, trains the aspiring operators in conducting operations in high altitude and arctic environments.
- The Frogmen troop consists of operators that have successfully completed the twenty-three-week Kikvorsman (Frogman) course which is provided by the Defensie Duikgroep (Defence Diving Group). During this course, the aspiring frogmen receive extensive training on conducting underwater assaults, reconnaissance, demolition and operating from one of the Walrus-class submarines of the Royal Netherlands Navy.

== Operations ==
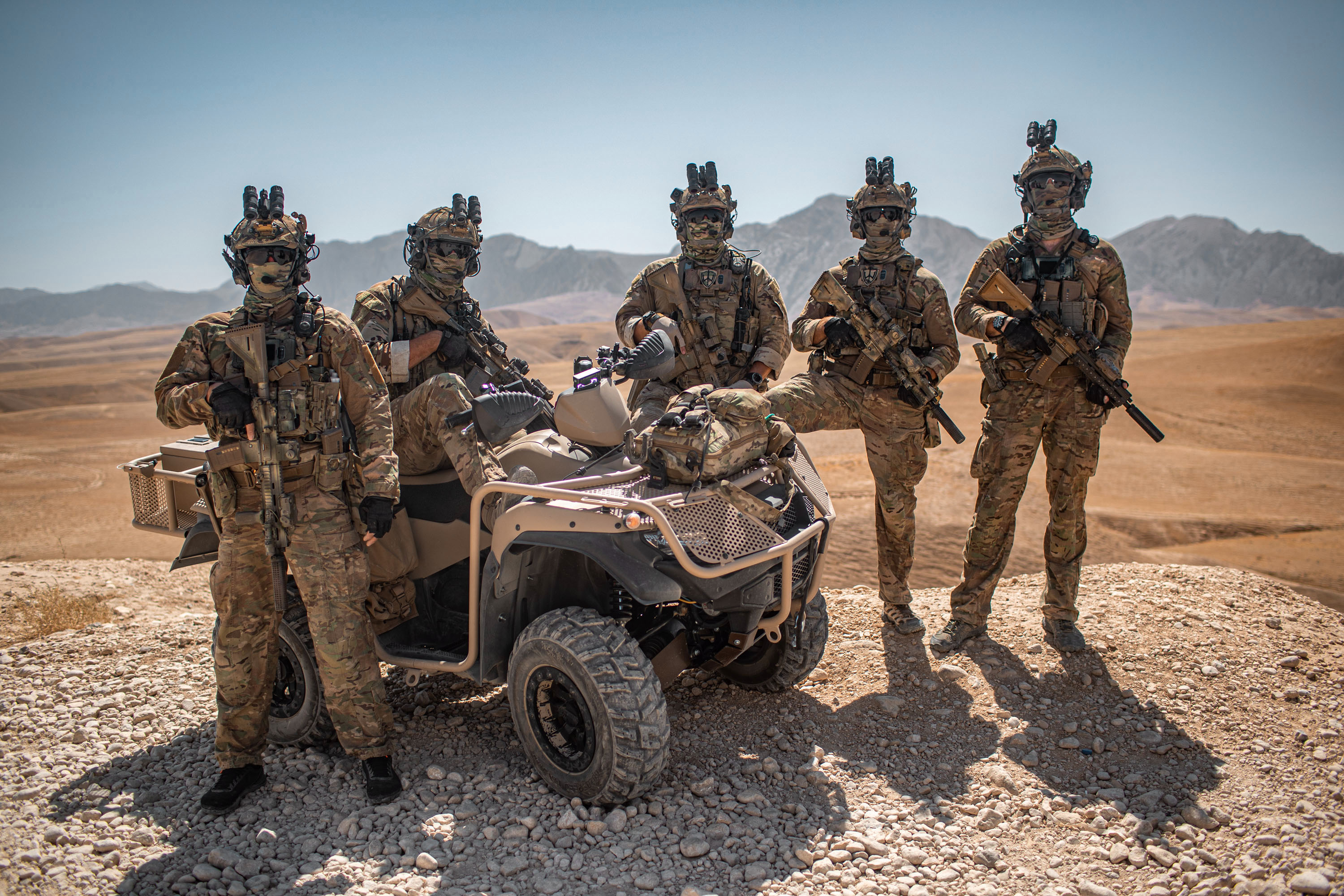
NLMARSOF operators in Mazar-i-Sharif, Afghanistan during their deployment as part of NATO's Resolute Support Mission.

Since its establishment M-Squadron, and its predecessors BBE and UIM, and C-Squadron, and its predecessor MSO-Company, have conducted various famous operations. An overview of some notable operations the units have been involved in:

- 1977 Dutch train hijacking.
- 1978 Dutch province hall hostage crisis.
- 2004 siege and arrest of terrorists of the Hofstad Network
- Afghanistan (2005–2006): NLD Special Forces Task Group Orange as part of Operation Enduring Freedom.
- 2006–2007 Afghanistan: NLD Special Forces Task Group Viper as part of International Security Assistance Force.
- 2009–2010 Afghanistan: Special Operation Task Group, TF-55, as part of International Security Assistance Force.
- 2010 liberation of MV Taipan.
- 2015–2017 Mali: NLD Special Operations Land Task Group as part of MINUSMA.
- 2015–present Iraq/Syria: Providing advice and assistance (A&A) to Iraqi and Peshmerga troops together with the Belgian SFG, as part of CJTF-OIR.
- 2018–present Afghanistan: NLD Special Operations Advisory Team, providing advice and assistance (A&A) to Afghan Territorial Force 888 (ATF-888) in cooperation with the German KSK as part of NATO's Resolute Support Mission.
- 2019 manhunt for the Utrecht tram shooter.

== Equipment ==
=== Weaponry ===
NLMARSOF operators have access to a wide variety of weapons. These include the following:

Name	Origin	Type	Cartridge	Image	Details
Glock 17	Austria	Semi-automatic pistol	9×19mm Parabellum		Standard issue pistol within NLMARSOF. Fitted with a laser light module.
Mossberg 590	United States	Pump-action shotgun	12 gauge		Used with buckshot ammunition and fitted with a pistol grip, optimised for door breaching.
FN P90	Belgium	Personal defence weapon	FN 5.7×28mm		Fitted with a suppressor, optics and a laser light module. Used by M-Squadron for domestic counter-terrorism operations.
Heckler & Koch MP7	Germany	Personal defence weapon	HK 4.6×30mm		Fitted with a suppressor, optics and a laser light module.
SIG MCX	Switzerland	Assault rifle	.300 AAC Blackout; 5.56×45mm NATO		Fitted with the SIG Sauer Suppressed Upper Receiver (SUR), an integral suppressor. In addition, it is fitted with a Magpul stock, SIG Sauer optics and a laser light module.
Heckler & Koch HK416	Germany	Assault rifle	5.56×45mm NATO		Standard-issue assault rifle within NLMARSOF. Fitted with a suppressor, optics and a laser light module.
FN MINIMI	Belgium	Light machine gun	5.56×45mm NATO		Used by C-Squadron during foreign deployments in high-risk environments.
Accuracy International AWM/AXMC	United Kingdom	Sniper rifle	.300 Winchester Magnum.338 Lapua Magnum		Anti-personnel sniper rifle in use with NLMARSOF sniper team. AXMC rifles, successor to the AWM, have recently been acquired to replace the aging AWM rifles.
Barrett M82	United States	Sniper rifle	.50 BMG		Anti-materiel rifle in use with NLMARSOF sniper teams.
Heckler & Koch UGL	Germany	Grenade launcher	40mm grenade		Undersling grenade launcher that can be fitted to the HK416 assault rifle.

=== Watercraft ===
- Diver propulsion vehicle: Underwater scooters are used for clandestine manoeuvres under water, and can be launched from one of the Walrus-class submarines of the Royal Netherlands Navy.
- Fast Raiding Interception Special Forces Craft (FRISCs): FRISC watercraft are used for tactical insertions and boarding operations.
- Water scooter: Modified Sea-Doo water scooters are used for clandestine reconnaissances, and for dropping off and/or picking up operators.

=== Vehicles ===
- Suzuki KingQuad: Used for long-range reconnaissance patrols that require a higher grade of maneuverability and approachability. Can be fitted with the FN MAG general purpose machine gun.
- Snowmobile: Used for operations in mountainous and/or arctic environments.
- Defenture VECTOR: Dutch-made special operations vehicle developed for, and in co-operation with the Korps Commandotroepen. Currently part of joint NLD SOCOM vehicle pool.
- Toyota Land Cruiser: Armoured tactical vehicle that is used by M-Squadron for domestic counter-terrorism operations.
