= Korps Commandotroepen =

Special forces unit of the Royal Netherlands Army

Commando Corps
- Korps Commandotroepen; KCT
- Uniform shoulder sleeve insignia of the Korps Commandotroepen (depicting a Fairbairn–Sykes fighting knife)
- Active: 22 March 1942 (as No. 2 (Dutch) Troop); 1 July 1950 – present (as Korps Commandotroepen)
- Country: Netherlands
- Allegiance: Government of the Netherlands
- Branch: Royal Netherlands Army
- Type: Special forces
- Role: Special operations Counter-terrorism
- Size: Six companies
- Part of: Netherlands Special Operations Command
- Headquarters: Engelbrecht van Nassaukazerne, Roosendaal
- Nicknames: "Shadow warriors", "Green berets"
- Mottos: Nunc aut Nunquam ("Now or Never")
- Colour of beret: Grass green
- March: Het Commandolied
- Decorations: Military William Order

Commanders
- Current commander: Colonel Huub Smeets

Insignia
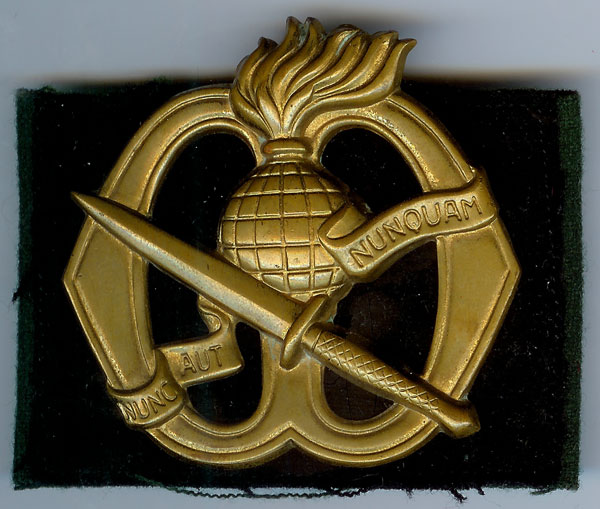
- Beret insignia

The Korps Commandotroepen (KCT) (English: Commando Corps) is the elite special forces unit of the Royal Netherlands Army. The KCT traces its origins to the Second World War with the founding of No. 2 (Dutch) Troop, and the founding of the Korps Speciale Troepen during the Indonesian War of Independence.

The corps currently consists of four active commando companies, a SOF Support company and a training company. The KCT is based at the Engelbrecht van Nassaukazerne in the city of Roosendaal. KCT missions are planned and coordinated by the Netherlands Special Operations Command (NLD SOCOM), as are the operations of its maritime counterpart NLMARSOF.

Due to the sensitivity of the unit's operations, which includes covert operations, much of the information about the KCT is classified. However, some deployments have been acknowledged and publicised by the Ministry of Defence. Since the end of the Cold War, the unit has seen extensive combat in conflict zones around the world. This includes deployments to the Balkans, Afghanistan, Iraq and Mali. Moreover, the unit has conducted numerous non-combatant evacuation operations in recent years.

== History ==
=== World War II ===
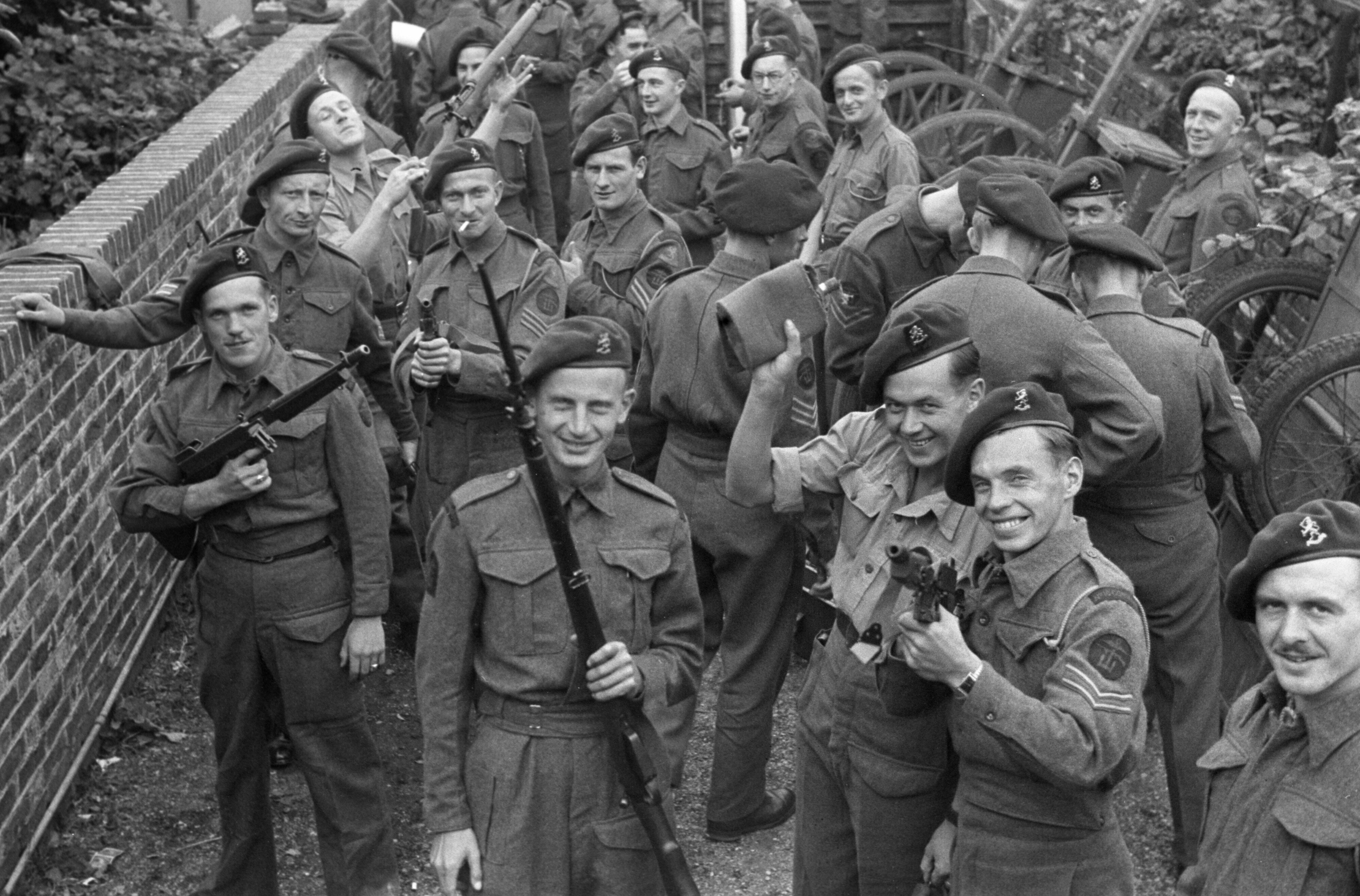
Commandos of No. 2 (Dutch) Troop in Eastbourne, England, before being shipped out to partake in Operation Market Garden

The roots of the KCT go back to World War II. The unit was formed under the name No. 2 (Dutch) Troop, which was part of No. 10 (Inter-Allied) Commando, on 22 March 1942. This date has lived on as the annual birthday of the present-day KCT. No. 2 (Dutch) Troop was tasked with conducting special operations, which, at the time, were operations that were considered too complex and too dangerous for conventional military units. In March 1942, the first 48 Dutch commandos were voluntarily selected from the Princess Irene Brigade and commenced training in four different British training centres, later rejoining in Achnacarry, Scotland. Of the 48 men, 25 managed to finish the intense commando course and were awarded the coveted green beret. From 1942 to 1943, the unit grew in size and achieved combat readiness.

While the unit was initially supposed to deploy in Malaysia and Sumatra in 1944, this deployment was later called off. However, five Dutch commandos were sent to Burma to fight against the Japanese forces in the Arakan Campaign in 1943. The troop returned to Europe in July 1944; in the ensuing months, multiple commandos were dropped in the German-occupied Netherlands to establish contact with the Dutch resistance forces. In September 1944, Dutch commandos joined the Allied paratrooper force to fight in the failed airborne Operation Market Garden. In addition, the troop fought to free the Dutch island of Walcheren as part of the allied Operation Infatuate in November 1944.

The unit was disbanded shortly after the liberation of the Netherlands, in October 1945. However, its personnel continued fighting in the Dutch East Indies, while others formed the Stormschool training command, located in Bloemendaal. In 1949, the Stormschool was relocated to the Engelbrecht van Nassaukazerne in Roosendaal, which remains the garrison of the present-day KCT.

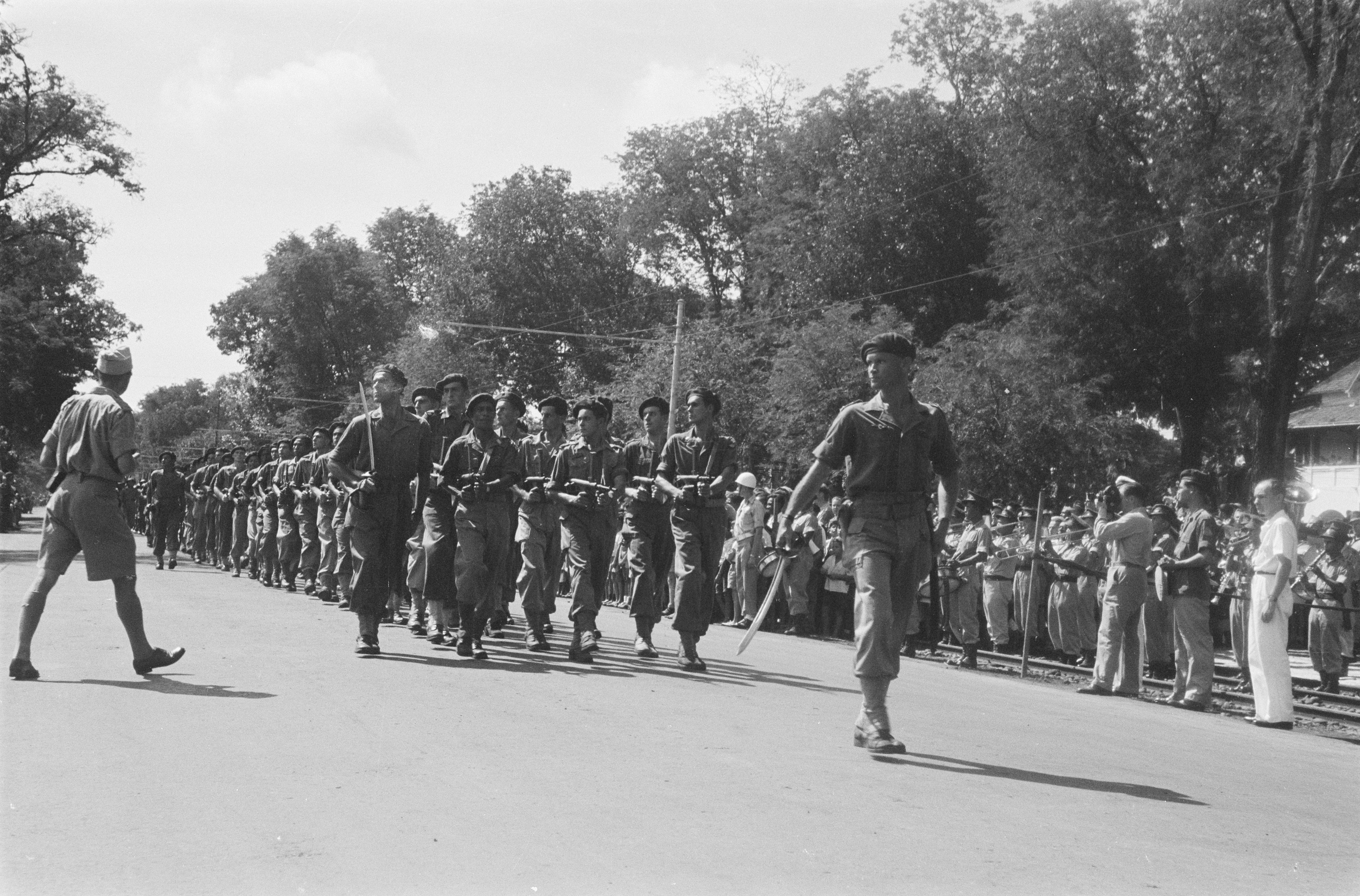
Paratroopers of the Korps Speciale Troepen headed by Captain Raymond Westerling during a parade in Batavia, 1947.

=== Dutch East Indies ===
A contingent of approximately 150 troops of the Princess Irene Brigade was sent to the Dutch East Indies in January 1942, in order to strengthen the Dutch defences on the island. Their journey was aborted following the Japanese occupation of the Dutch East Indies, causing the troops to become stuck on the island state of British Ceylon. While the majority of the troops were recalled to Europe, a group of volunteers were selected to attend a special training course for jungle operations. This commando unit, named Korps Insulinde, was tasked with conducting guerrilla warfare, sabotage and intelligence operations on Sumatra, against the Japanese occupiers. Following the Japanese capitulation, Korps Insulinde was tasked with the search and rescue of (Dutch) POWs. In November 1945, the unit was disbanded - many of its members remained in military service and joined sister commando units.

During the Indonesian war of independence, which lasted from 1945 to 1949, the special operations unit Depot Speciale Troepen (DST) was established. The unit was part of the Royal Netherlands Indies Army and saw intense combat throughout the conflict. DST was tasked with conducting counterinsurgency operations and the elimination of Indonesian nationalists, and was commanded by Captain Raymond Westerling. The unit conducted numerous successful contraguerrilla operations, while simultaneously gaining notoriety for its harsh treatment of insurgents during the South Sulawesi campaign. This successful military campaign involved the alleged execution of thousands of Indonesian insurgents. In 1948, the unit, then renamed to Korps Speciale Troepen (KST), participated in Operation Kraai. During this operation, Dutch forces successfully captured Yogyakarta, the temporary capital of the Indonesian Republic. In addition, numerous high-ranking Indonesian leaders, including the Republican President Sukarno, were arrested.

Following the acknowledgement of Indonesian independence by the Dutch government in 1949, the KST returned to the Netherlands. On 1 July 1950, via parliamentary recommendation, the KST merged with the training command Stormschool in Roosendaal to form the present Korps Commandotroepen (KCT).

=== The modern KCT ===
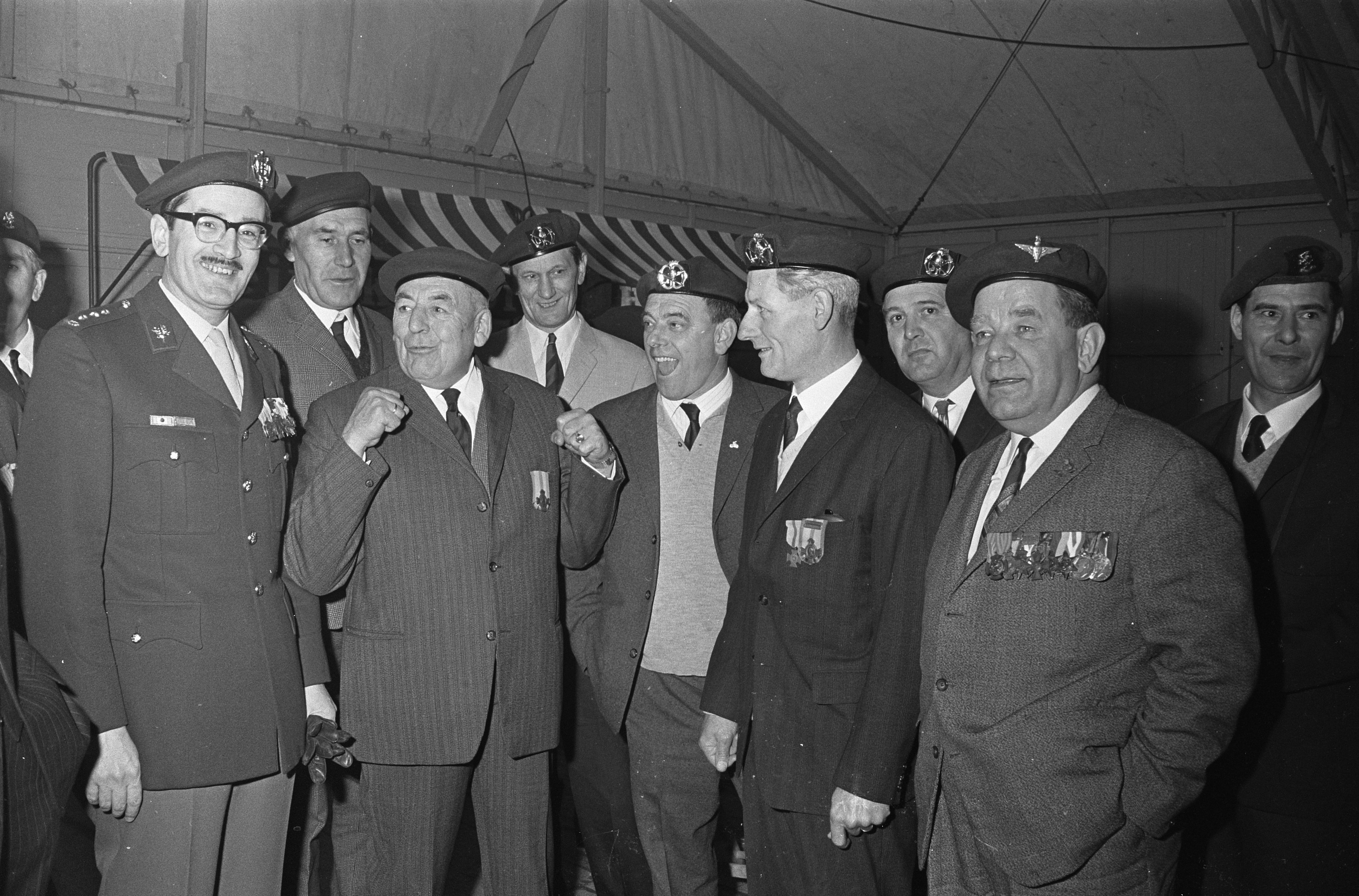
KCT veterans during the celebration of the 25-years anniversary of the corps, in 1967.

During the 1950s, the KCT transitioned to an organisation with three active companies made up of conscripts. In the context of heightened tensions between NATO and the Warsaw Pact during the Cold War, the commandos were trained to carry out reconnaissance behind enemy lines, sabotage and intelligence operations.

In the 1960s, Korps Commandotroepen was greatly reduced in size to one active observation and reconnaissance company: 104 Waarnemings- en Verkenningscompagnie. This company was placed under the most senior field commander of the army, the commander of I Army Corps. In addition, commandos were selected to become part of the Dutch stay-behind network which was tasked with setting up an underground resistance organisation in the case of a Russian invasion.

The fall of the Berlin Wall in 1989 became a turning point for the Dutch armed forces in its entirety, and the KCT in particular. With the threat of Cold War receding, operational demands deviated significantly from the old set of tasks. Since the 9/11 Attacks, terrorism became the biggest threat, resulting in a high demand for specialist counter-terrorism units, capable of operating expeditionary. To keep up with these demands, the KCT's old role of Commando Waarnemer-verkenner (Commando Force Reconnaissance) was replaced by that of a role better suited for contemporary and versatile operations; Commando Speciale Operaties (Commando Special Operations). In addition, KCT switched from a "part conscript, part professional force" to a fully professional unit in 1995. The last conscripts made way for professional operators in 1996, when Dutch conscription was suspended. Since then, the KCT structure and operational capability have undergone a complete transformation, with great success. The unit grew from one active company to four, and matured into a professional and versatile SOF unit with a considerable reputation.

== Structure ==
As of March 2025 the Korps Commandotroepen consists of the following units:

- Korps Commandotroepen, in Roosendaal
  - Staff and Support Company (Stafverzorgingscompagnie)
  - Special Operations Instruction and Training Company (Opleidings- en trainingscompagnie speciale operaties (OTCSO))
  - 102nd Company (102 Compagnie)
  - 103rd Commando Troops Company (103 Commandotroepencompagnie)
  - 104th Commando Troops Company (104 Commandotroepencompagnie)
  - 105th Commando Troops Company (105 Commandotroepencompagnie)
  - 108th Commando Troops Company (108 Commandotroepencompagnie)

The Commando companies each consist of several teams (ploegen) with their respective specialisations, such as mountain specialists, divers or HAHO/HALO paras. A commando team usually consists of eight operators, but this number is frequently adapted to the operational needs.

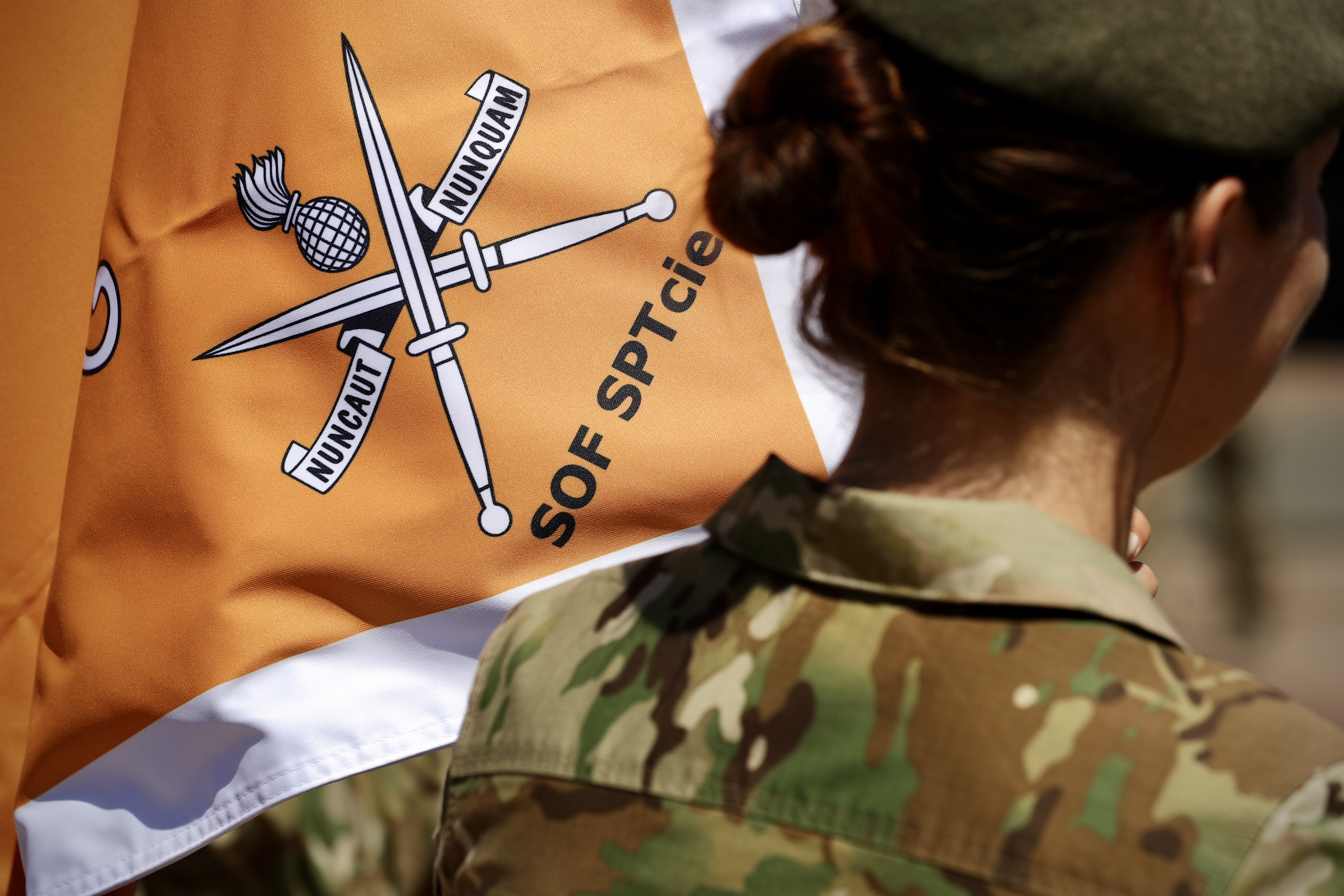
Ensign of the SOF Support Company during the formal foundation ceremony

Since 5 December 2018, KCT operations have been coordinated by the then-established command element Netherlands Special Operations Command (NLD SOCOM). The KCT remains part of the Royal Netherlands Army.

Due to the high operational tempo, the Ministry of Defence decided to allocate additional funding to the operational and logistic support of the corps. Consequently, the Staff company was transformed into the SOF Support Company and simultaneously expanded with new 'dedicated' SOF-enablers; specialist personnel trained to support commandos during special operations. In addition, the Corps Staff and Education and Training Company were provided with additional personnel.

On 1 June 2021, the SOF Support Company was formally established. The logistic, medical and signals platoons were reinforced with new personnel and equipment. Moreover, the Corps was expanded with a Special Operations Intelligence Cell (SOIC) to gather tactical intelligence, a specialist SOF EOD and engineer capacity to identify and neutralise explosive devices and a Special Operations Surgical Team to provide extensive medical support in the battlefield. A Combat Control Team (CCT) provides support during helicopter operations and the operation of unmanned aerial vehicles. Lastly, the military working dog teams have also been centralised in the SOF Support Company.

== Training and specialisation ==
The KCT accepts applications from both actively serving military personnel (infantry) and civilians. To conform to the recruitment guidelines of the Royal Netherlands Army, the KCT accepts both male and female applicants.

=== Training ===
==== Selection ====
In order to be considered for the KCT, all civilian and military candidates must participate in a three-day try-out. This try-out is to test each individual's physical and mental stamina, monitored by the KCT cadre and Defense psychologists, who will make a profile of each participant. The try-out's lay-out is kept secret, as a means to see how participants cope with sudden changes and stress. Military candidates additionally require certain military skills such as forced marches, obstacle course and speed march at a set time with a medium load.

==== Introductory training ====
Once rated positively, the selected candidates continue to the psychological and medical screening, and if these are met with positive outcomes, they commence with basic training. Civilian candidates have to successfully complete the AMOL, the 23-week Air Assault school training of the 11 Airmobile Brigade, as a means to adequately prepare them with basic military skills and drills. Military candidates will skip the basic training, and start with the eight-week vooropleiding (VO), the "warm-up" as a preparation for the elementary commando course (ECO), which is the selection. Civilian candidates fresh out of the Air Assault School will rejoin the military candidates and proceed with the ECO.

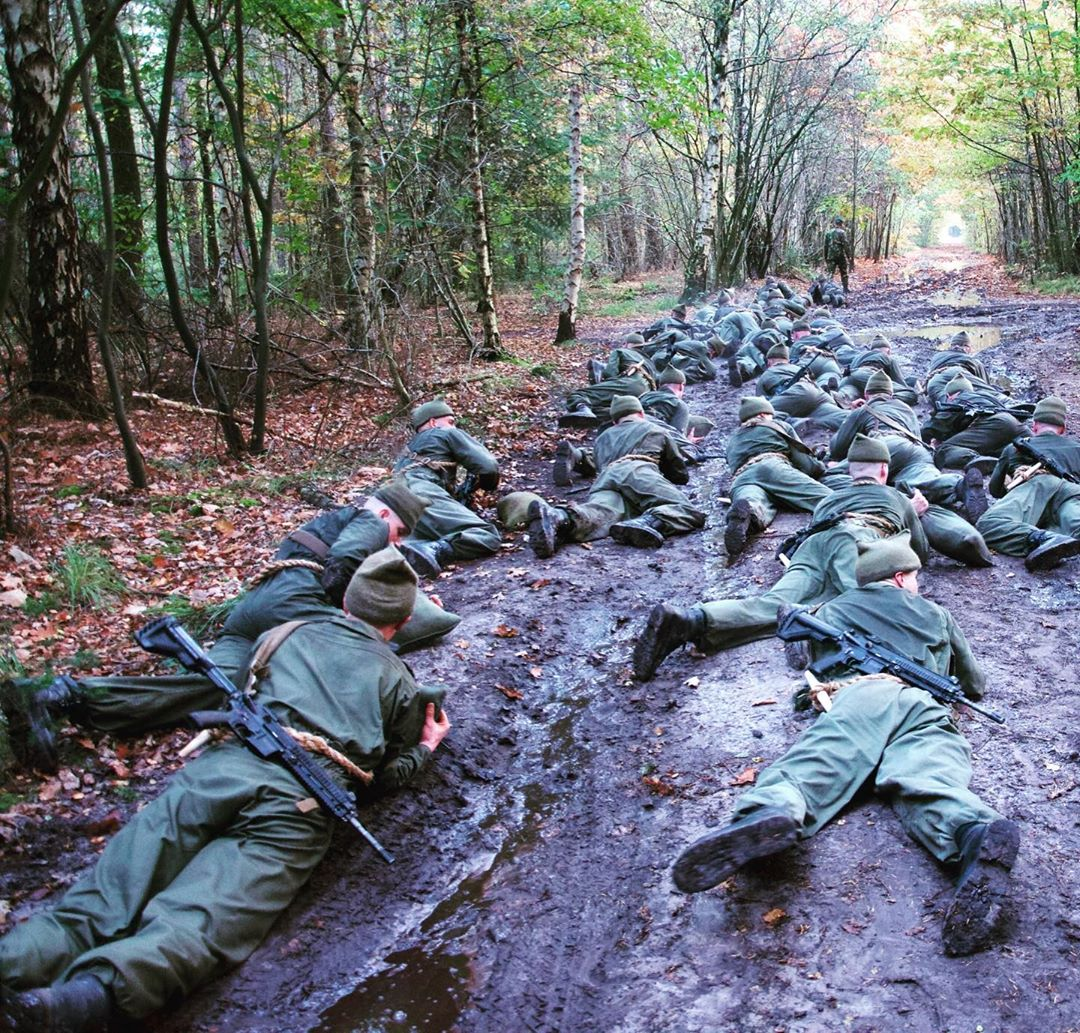
Aspiring commandos continue to carry traditional commando gear during the Elementary Commando Course, such as the toggle rope.

==== Elementary Commando Course ====
With an attrition rate of 80-95% for experienced military personnel and 95-100% for civilian candidates, the ECO (elementaire commando opleiding, elementary commando course) serves as the final training phase and selection. Though secretive, continuous physical and mental conditioning is known to take place. Most of the eight to nine weeks long training are conducted outside of the garrison in Roosendaal, with some training being done in the Belgian highlands and mountains. The final week is the culmination exercise, "hell week" (De Afmatting), which consists of a week of continuous intense activities including escape and evasion exercises, forced marches, and speed marches, coupled with sleep deprivation. It concludes with a final forced march carrying the full load to the KCT headquarters. There, the remaining candidates are awarded with the green beret.

==== Advanced Commando Course ====
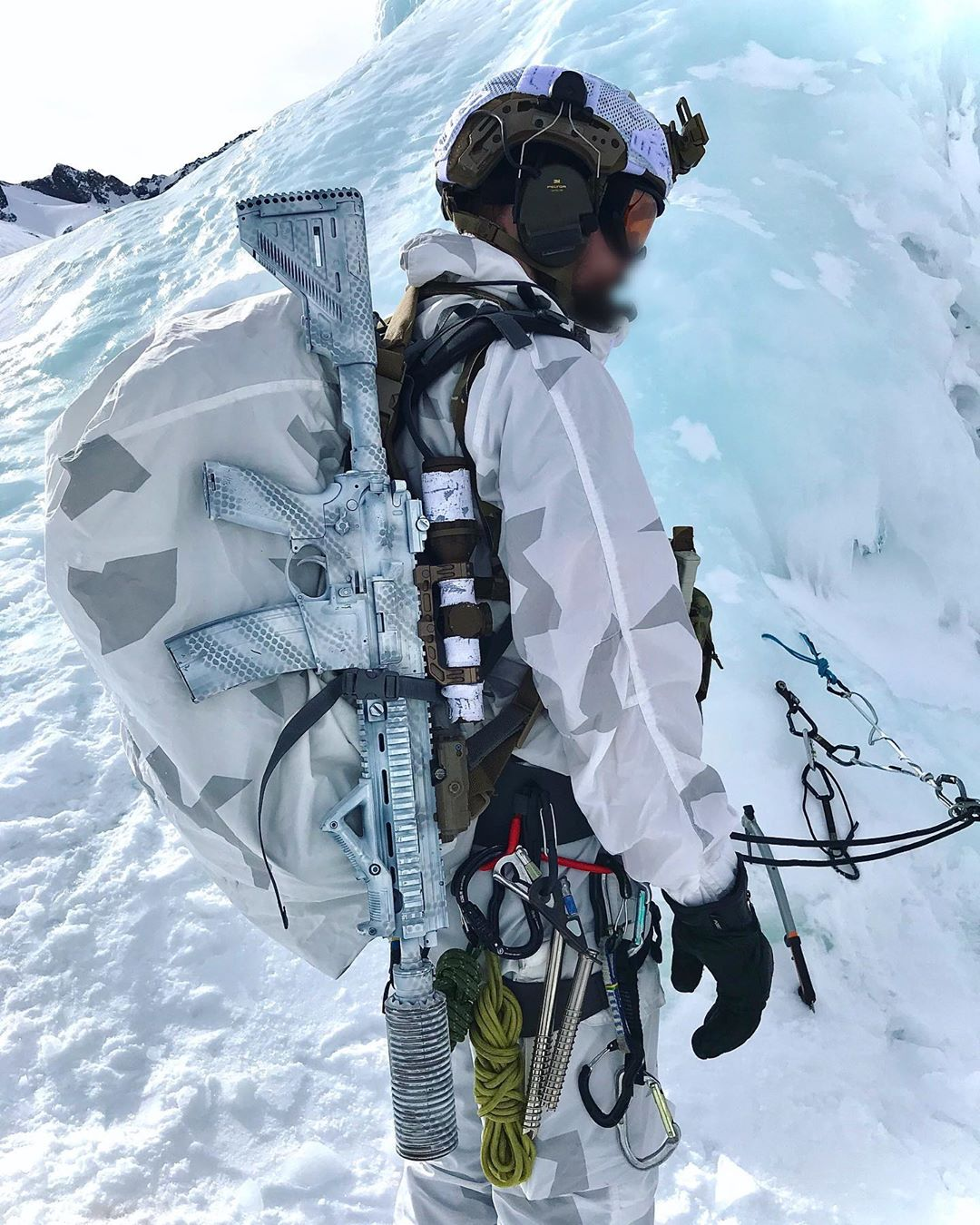
Operator during the Heeresbergführer mountain leader course in Austria.

Passing the ECO grants the temporary right to wear the green beret, and the prospective operator continues with the VCO (voortgezette commando opleiding, advanced commando course). The VCO takes approximately one year and trains the prospective operator in the full spectrum of special operations, which includes special reconnaissance and direct action. After completion, the operator earns the title Commando Speciale Operaties, and is granted the permanent right to wear the green beret. Consequently, the commando will proceed to join one of the four operational commando companies.

=== Specialisation ===
==== Individual specialisations ====
During this Advanced Commando Course, the prospective operators will choose an operational specialisation. The aspiring commandos can choose to specialise as a combat medic, demolition specialist, communication specialist or sniper.

==== Team specialisations ====
In addition to individual specialisations, KCT companies consist of teams specialised in counter-terrorism, mountain warfare (mountain leaders have to complete the Heeresbergführer course in Austria), maritime warfare (inland and coastal waters) and HAHO/HALO parachuting. While new operators will initially be assigned to a regular commando team, all operators will eventually have to choose a preferred team specialisation and receive further training.

== Tasks ==
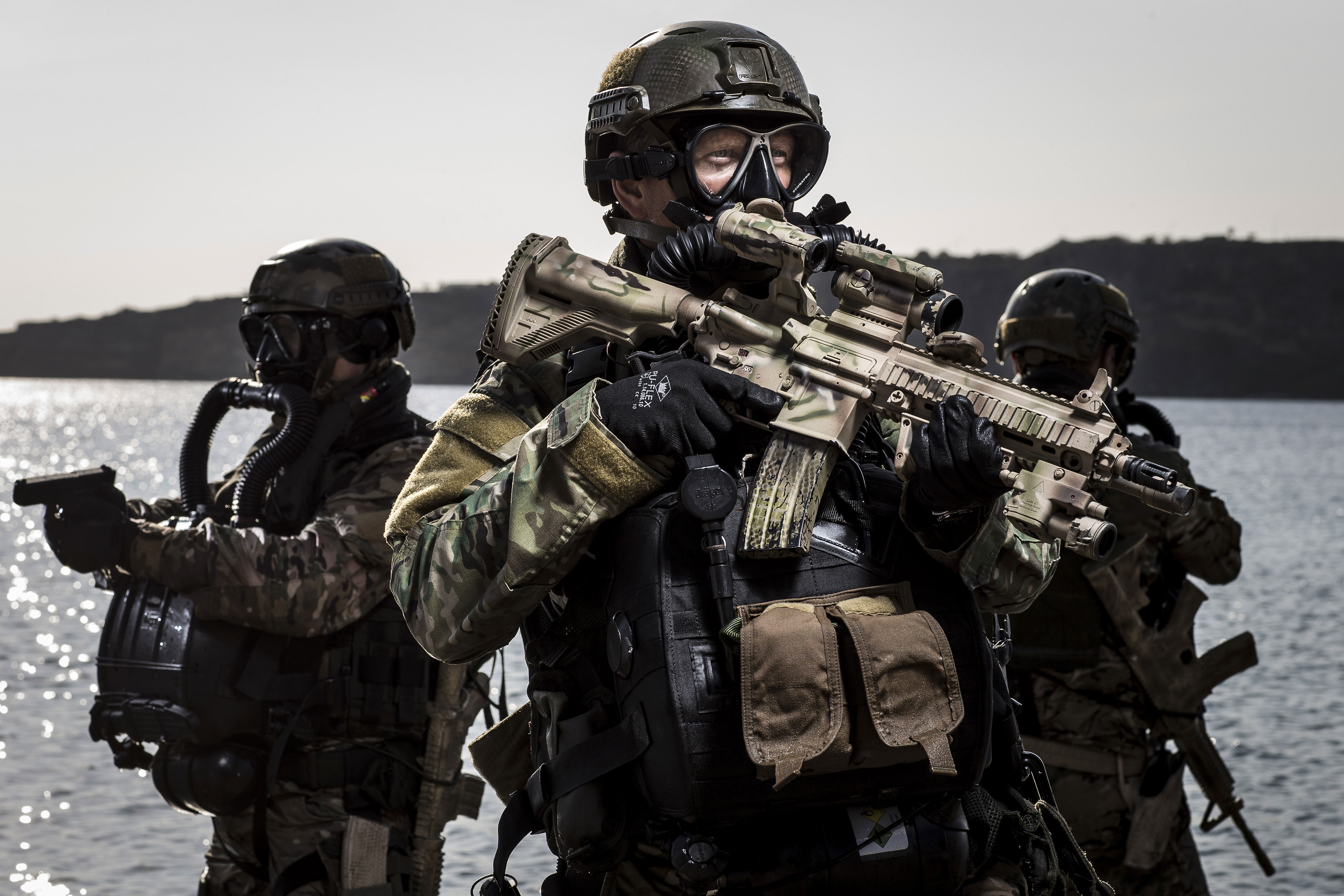
KCT diver carrying a HK416 D10RS.

The KCT is tasked with conducting the full spectrum of Special Operations. The three principal Special Operations tasks are:

- Military Assistance (MA): Providing assistance to foreign military units, including training, advice and mentoring.
- Special Reconnaissance (SR): Gathering intelligence on adversaries. This includes environmental reconnaissance, target assessment, threat assessment and post-strike reconnaissance.
- Direct Action (DA): A wide variety of offensive actions. This includes the conduct of raids, ambushes and assaults, terminal guidance operations, recovery operations and precision destruction operations.

These principal tasks are applied to support the following activities:

- Counter-insurgency (COIN)
- Counter-terrorism (CT)
- Hostage Release Operations (HRO)
- Faction Liaison Operations

== Traditions ==
=== Beret ===
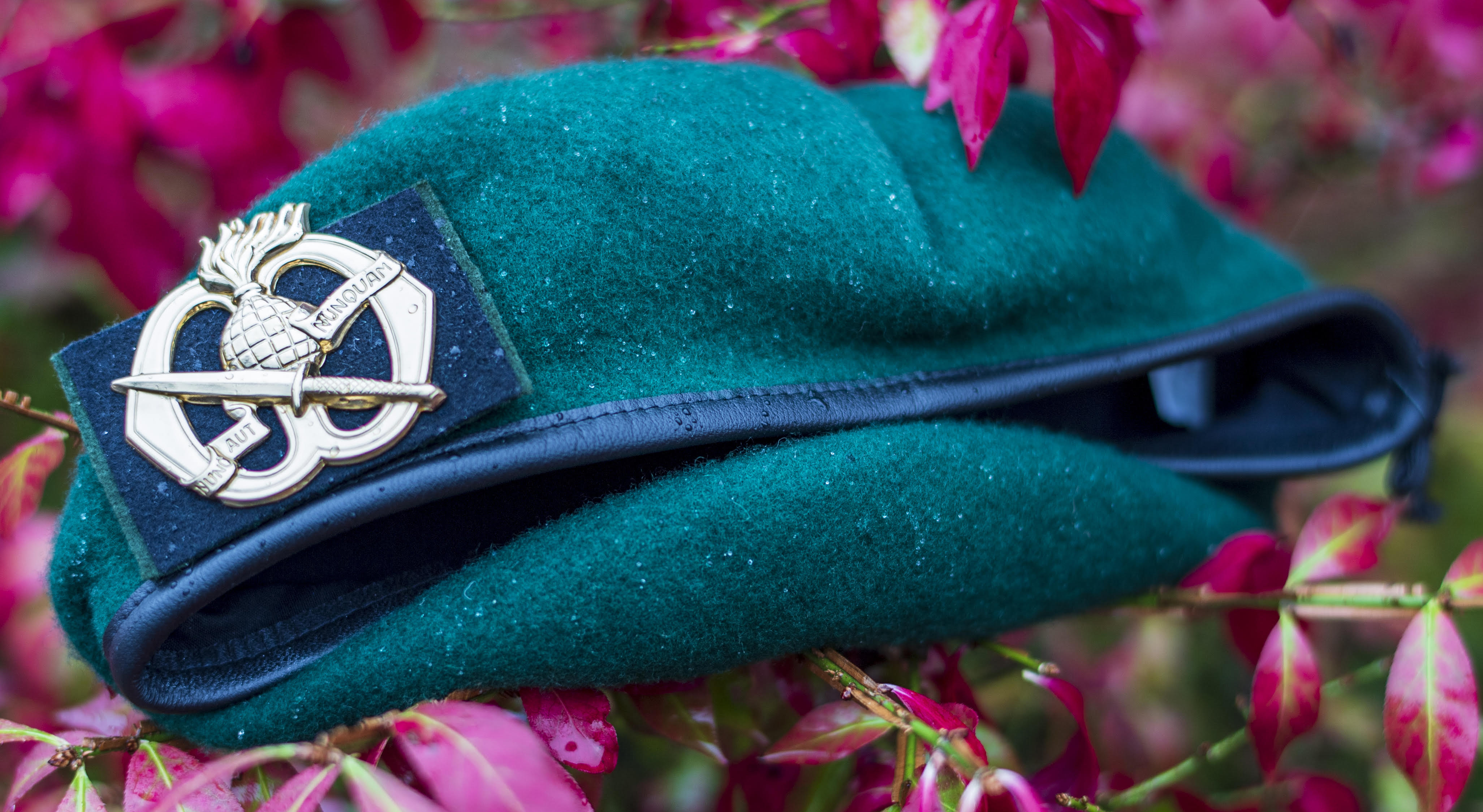
Korps Commandotroepen green beret

The first batch of No. 2 (Dutch) Troop commandos wore the standard uniform of the British Army, supplemented with a field cap or the brodie helmet. With the changing mission set, the need for distinguishing headwear for the commandos arose. When the soldiers of No. 1 Commando chose a green beret as its standard headwear, No. 2 (Dutch) Troop soon followed suit. To this day, Dutch commandos have continued to wear the green beret.

The current KCT beret consists of the brass beret emblem, displaying a Fairbairn–Sykes fighting knife, a hand grenade and a ribbon with an inscription of the unit's motto Nunc aut Nunquam. The background of the emblem consists of a gothic typeface "W", referring to the name Wilhelmina, Queen of the Netherlands from 1898 to 1948. The beret emblem is worn on a black background with a green border.

=== Uniforms ===
Although the KCT was established in 1942, the full dress uniform of the unit follows the uniform tradition of the conventional infantry units, dating back to 1912. The uniform consists of blue-black trousers and a blue-black jacket with a standing collar, the green commando aiguillette is worn on the left shoulder and the Fairbairn–Sykes fighting knife is attached to the belt on the left side.

While the conventional forces of the army continue to wear uniforms in Disruptive Pattern Material, the KCT switched to combat uniforms in the commercially produced MultiCam camouflage pattern. Uniforms in this pattern were earlier worn by commandos during deployments in Afghanistan and proved to be highly effective. Therefore, the KCT chose to implement MultiCam uniforms as their standard combat uniform.

=== Colour ===
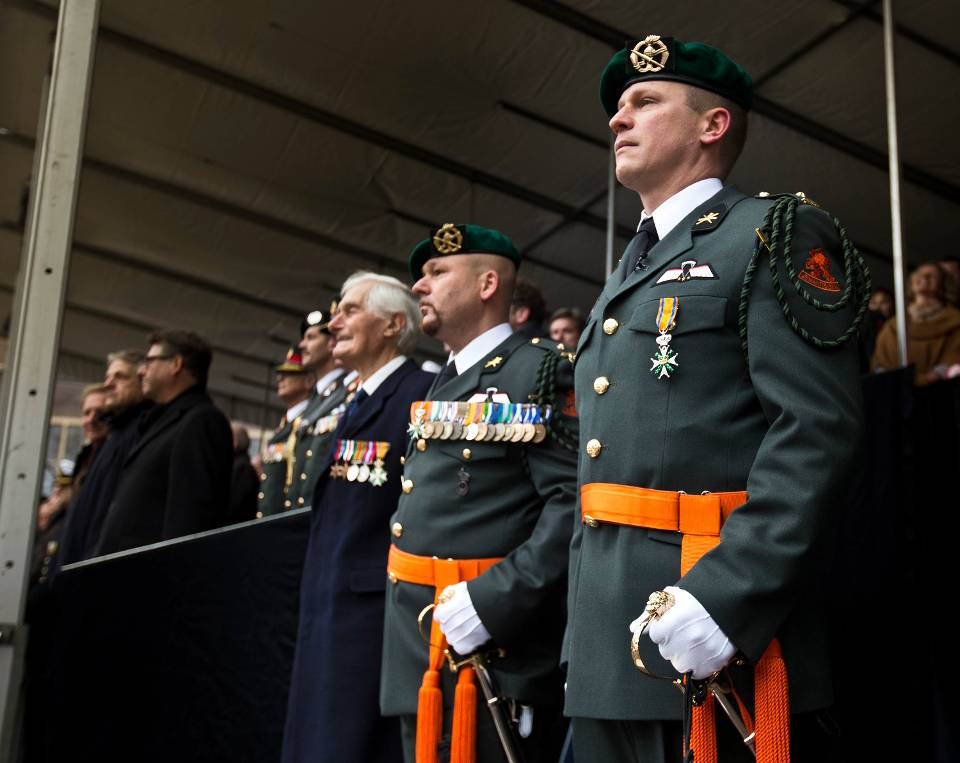
Knights of the Military William Order, from left to right; Kenneth Mayhew, Marco Kroon and Gijs Tuinman.

Prince Bernhard first awarded the men of No. 2 (Dutch) Troop with a red-white-blue fanion in December 1943. In December 1955, Queen Juliana finally awarded the corps its military colours. In December 2019, a Royal Decree announced that new battle honours were to be displayed on the colours of several units that deployed to Afghanistan, this included the KCT. The colour of the KCT currently displays the following embroidered battle honours:

- Arakan 1944
- Arnhem 1944
- Nijmegen 1944
- Eindhoven 1944
- Vlissingen 1944
- Westkapelle 1944
- Djokjakarta 1948
- Central Sumatra 1948-1949
- Uruzgan 2006-2007
- Helmand, Kandahar & Uruzgan 2009-2010

In 2016, the Korps Commandotroepen was awarded the Military Order of William for bravery, leadership, and courage during operations in Afghanistan.

== Recent operations ==
While the majority of operations conducted by KCT operators remain classified, several operations and deployments are publicly known. Below follows an overview of various peace-keeping, peace-enforcing, and direct action operations the commandos have been involved in since the beginning of the post–Cold War era:

=== Afghanistan ===
Special Reconnaissance Unit

Following the United States invasion of Afghanistan in late 2001, a commando platoon was deployed to the Afghan capital of Kabul in response to requests by the United States, in 2003. As Special Reconnaissance Unit of the International Security Assistance Force, the platoon was mainly active near Kabul; here they conducted reconnaissances, gathered intelligence, and provided security in the capital's safe zone. The deployment was relatively calm, and no intense fighting took place. However, in July 2003 a commando sergeant hit an improvised explosive device with his vehicle, resulting in heavy injuries to both of his legs. The detachment was recalled in the winter of 2003.

Task Group Orange

In February 2005, cabinet honoured a request by the United States to deploy special operations forces to the southern province of Kandahar, in Afghanistan as part of Operation Enduring Freedom. The contingent, called Special Forces Task Group-Afghanistan (SFTG-A) and known in the coalition as Task Group Orange, consisted of a staff, a KCT company supplemented with NLMARSOF operators, four CH-47 Chinook helicopters of the Royal Netherlands Air Force and a logistical detachment. The Task Group was tasked with tracking and neutralising insurgents, monitoring the Pakistan-Afghanistan border and preventing the infiltration of Pakistani insurgents. In 2006, their attention shifted to the province of Helmand, where the commandos were involved in multiple intense combat situations.

Task Force Viper

Task Force Viper, composed of commandos and marines, was deployed to the province of Uruzgan in the spring of 2006. The task force conducted the first reconnaissance in the run-up to the operations Deployment Task Force, which was tasked with building a vast base (Kamp Holland within Multi National Base Tarin Kot) for the Dutch troops of Task Force Uruzgan (TFU), which was part of the International Security Assistance Force. When TFU became operational, in August 2006, the commandos were tasked with conducting enemy disrupting reconnaissance and supported conventional troops when needed. In the spring of 2007, the commandos played a crucial role in the intense Battle of Chora where they performed a successful flanking of enemy positions in the Baluchi Valley. Until the end of 2007, the task force was engaged in a constant stream of troops-in-contact, during which they eliminated many Taliban insurgents while taking no casualties themselves. The courageous performance of Task Force Viper led to the awarding of numerous military decorations. This included the awarding of the highest Dutch military decoration to Marco Kroon, who became a knight of the Military William Order.

Task Force 55

In 2009, commandos were again deployed to Afghanistan, this time as part of Task Force 55 (TF-55). The commandos were tasked with combating, disrupting and attacking the Taliban insurgents, which led to this deployment being the most intense of the three task groups. TF-55 fought against local drug lords, militias, and Islamic extremists and was frequently involved in severe firefights. In July 2009, nine commandos conducted an operational combat parachute jump into enemy territory in an operation aimed at mapping the movements of local Taliban. During an operation in September 2009, corporal Kevin van de Rijdt was killed in action during a ferocious battle in the valley of the Helmand river. Six fellow commandos managed to evacuate his body under heavy enemy fire, for which they were awarded with multiple decorations. TF-55 ceased operations in August 2010, when the Dutch contribution to Task Force Uruzgan came to an end. Major Gijs Tuinman was awarded the Military William Order in 2014, for his heroic leadership during the evacuation efforts of the body of corporal Van de Rijdt.

Special Operations Advisory Team

Since 2018, KCT companies and NLMARSOF squadrons, together with operators of the German Kommando Spezialkräfte, form the Special Operations Advisory Team (SOAT) in northern Afghanistan. The SOAT, which is based near the city of Mazar-i-Sharif, is tasked with training the Afghan police tactical unit Afghan Territorial Force-888 (ATF-888). The commandos provide the Afghan troops with military training, and join them during operations to provide advice and, if needed, assistance. The SOAT was granted permission to conduct operations in the entirety of Afghanistan in May 2019.

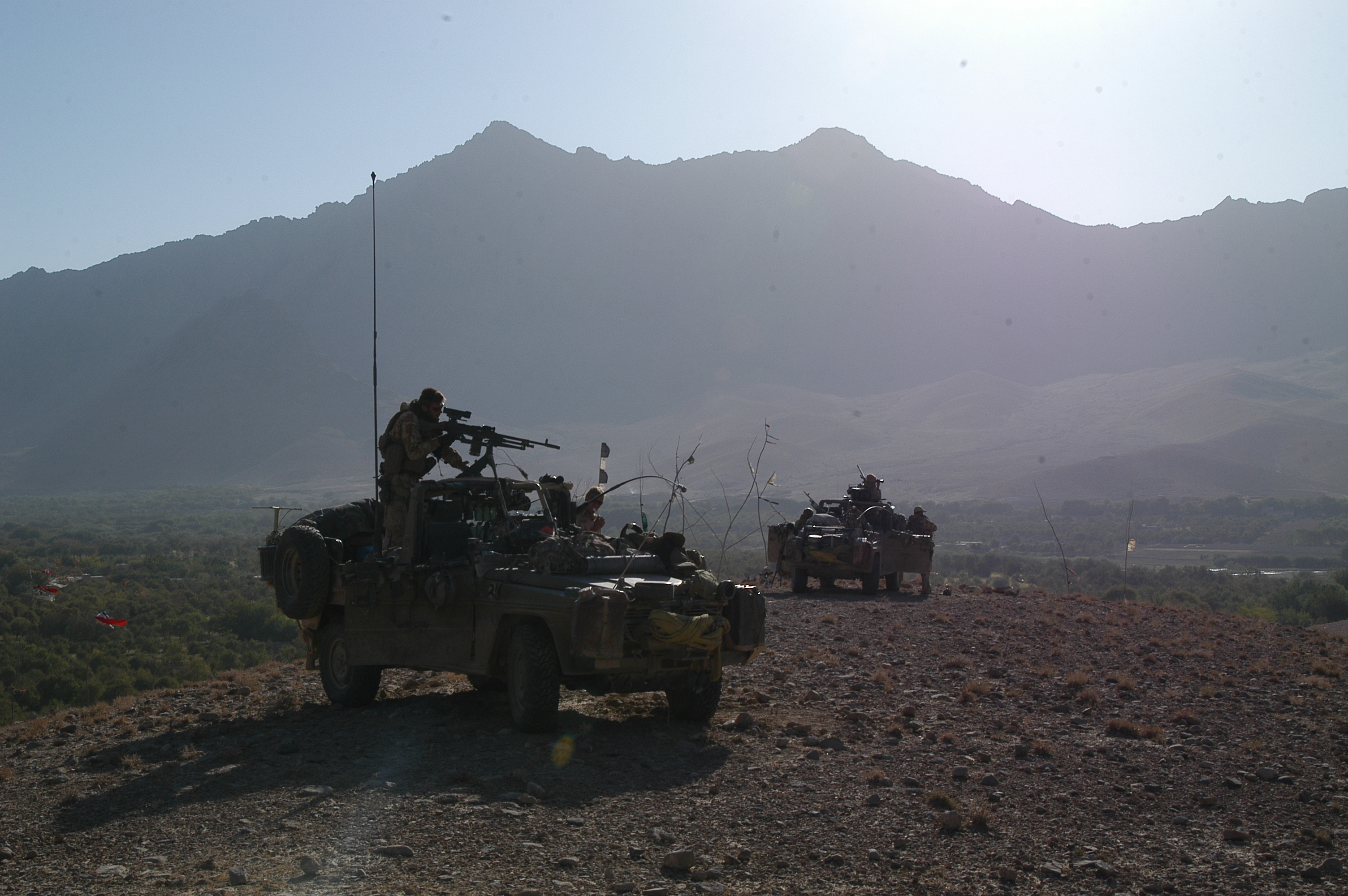
Operators of SFTG Viper during a mounted patrol using Mercedes-Benz G Wagons, in 2006.

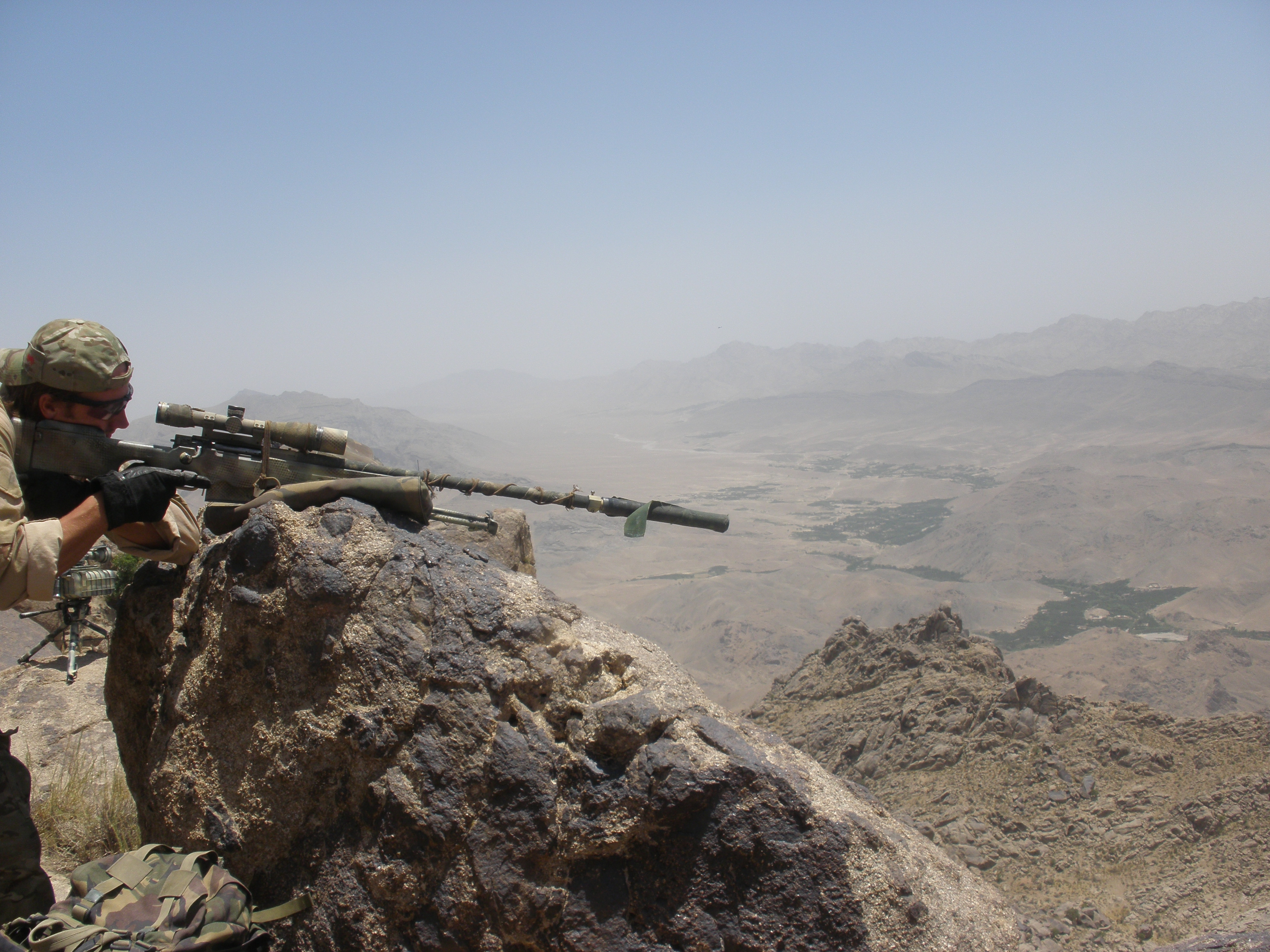
KCT sniper with an Accuracy International Arctic Warfare rifle during a mission in southern Afghanistan.

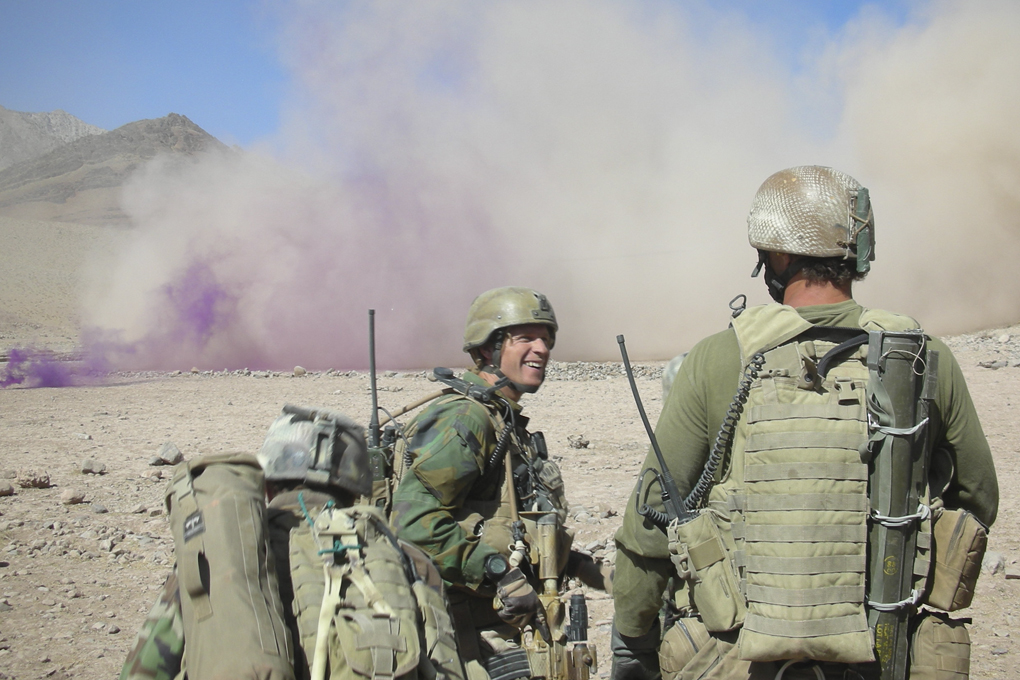
Knight of the Military William Order Gijs Tuinman in Uruzgan as part of Task Force 55, date unknown.

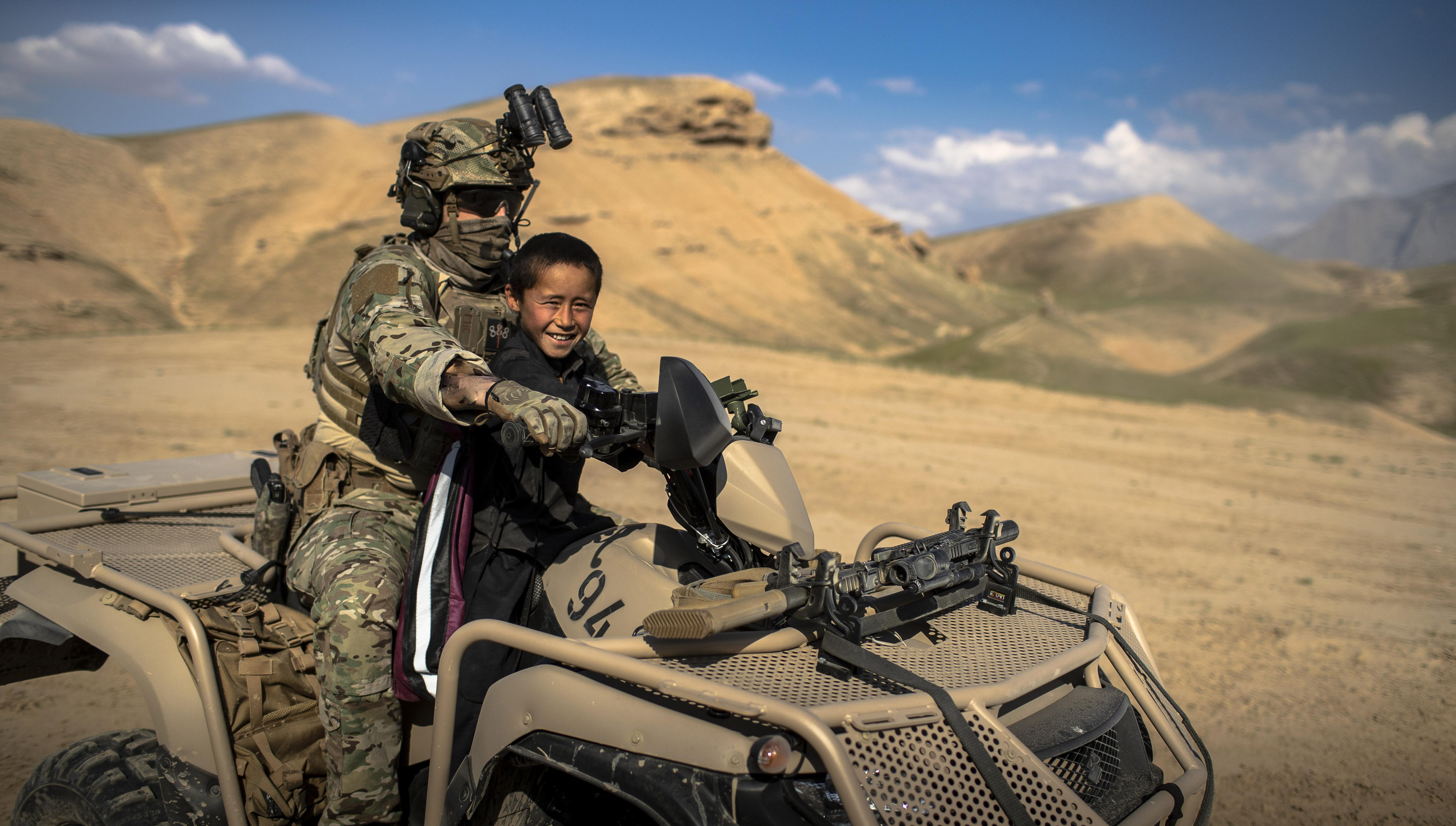
Commando on a Suzuki KingQuad with an Afghan boy near Mazar-e-Sharif.

=== Former Yugoslavia ===
Bosnia-Herzegovina;

A platoon of commandos was attached to the Dutchbats deployed to Bosnia-Herzegovina, as part of the United Nations Protection Force, from 1994 to 1995. The commandos were tasked with conducting special reconnaissance and patrols in challenging landscapes. The deployment became infamous as a result of the brutal Srebrenica genocide committed by Bosniak-Serbs, in July 1995.

From 1995 to 1996 as part of the Implementation Force (IFOR), and from 1996 to 1998 as part of Stabilization Force (SFOR), commandos remained active in the Former Yugoslavia. The commandos operated in the Joint Commission Observer (JCO) role, which meant that they functioned as the eyes and ears in their area of operations and provided higher commands with relevant intelligence on the various belligerents. In addition, the commandos (in co-operation with NLMARSOF) arrested several Croatian war criminals in their operational grid. The JCO deployments were ended in 2001.

Macedonia

After tensions rose between Albanian rebels and the Macedonian army, NATO intervened to prevent an all-out civil war from developing. Commandos were deployed as part of the NATO Operation Essential Harvest, which was aimed at collecting weaponry in Macedonia. In addition, KCT operators were part of Task Force Fox. This task force provided security to the international observers and was tasked with enforcing the peace deal. The mission came to an end in December 2002.

=== Iraq ===
Iraqi Six

Six commandos were deployed to Iraq in May 1991 as part of Operation Provide Comfort, and were tasked with setting up communications between the Dutch contingent and the Netherlands. The mission ended in July 1991.

(NL) Battlegroup

From 2003 to 2005, commandos were part of the battalion-sized reinforced (NL) Battlegroup, which was part of the Multi-National Force – Iraq. A KCT company conducted reconnaissances operations in the Al Muthanna desert in order to gain insight into possible smuggling operations. In addition, they conducted house raids and gathered intelligence among the Iraqi population. The battlegroup returned home in early 2005, after which British troops took over their area of operations.

Intervention against ISIL

Since 2015, the KCT has been active in Iraq to contribute to the international military intervention against ISIL. Commandos and NLMARSOF operators provide advice and assistance (A&A) to Iraqi and Peshmerga troops in northern Iraq, as part of Combined Joint Task Force - Operation Inherent Resolve (CJTF-OIR). In addition, they provide training and assistance to the Iraqi Special Operations Forces in the capital of Baghdad.

=== Mali ===
Commandos were deployed to Mali as part of the United Nations Multidimensional Integrated Stabilization Mission in Mali (MINUSMA), from early 2014 until 2016, when they were relieved by troops of the 11 Airmobile Brigade and the 13 Light Brigade. The commandos were tasked with gathering intelligence on the local jihadi and Tuareg militias operating in the Sahel region. The KCT detachment was supported by logistic troops, AH-64 Apache attack helicopters and CH-47 Chinook transport helicopters. In December 2016, 32 commandos were awarded the operational wing for a High Altitude High Opening parachute infiltration, during which they were dropped from a Royal Netherlands Air Force C-130 Hercules transport aircraft.

=== Non-combatant evacuations ===
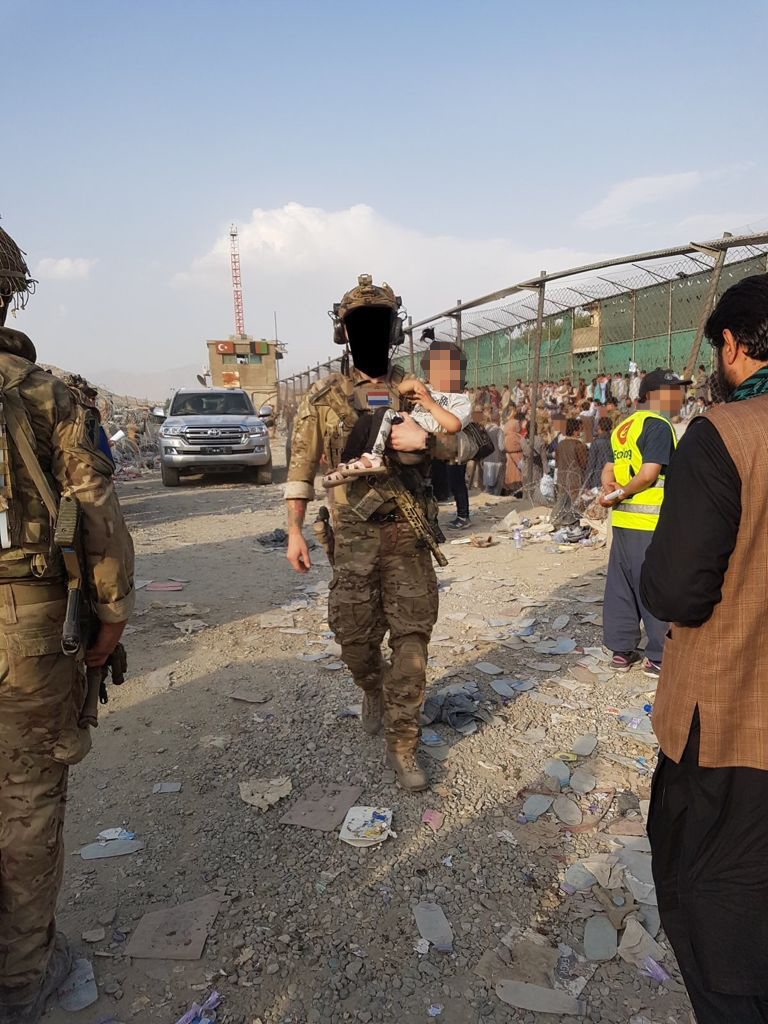
Commando with an Afghan child on Hamid Karzai International Airport during the evacuation operation in Kabul, 2021.

Ivory Coast

On 10 November 2004, the Ministry of Foreign Affairs decided to evacuate all Dutch citizens and diplomatic personnel, situated in the port city of Abidjan in civil-war-torn Ivory Coast. On the 11th of November, Operation Golden Eagle commenced and two commando teams were flown to Abidjan by a Royal Netherlands Air Force KDC-10. The commandos swiftly evacuated 59 Dutch citizens in co-operation with French troops, after which they provided security to the Dutch embassy. The commandos returned on the 14th of November by a Royal Netherlands Air Force C-130 Hercules, accompanied with the last remaining diplomatic personnel.

Lebanon

In the summer of 2006, the KCT was involved in an evacuation mission once again. In response to the escalating Israeli-Lebanese war in 2006, which involved large scale air strikes by the Israeli Air Force, the Ministry of Foreign Affairs decided to offer all Dutch citizens in Lebanon a voluntary evacuation. Consequently, on 14 July 2006, a detachment composed of KCT and BSB operators were deployed to conduct the evacuation. The detachment was tasked with gathering intelligence, setting up communications on the ground with allied troops, and guarding the Dutch embassy in the capital of Beirut. Four days later, all citizens who sent a request were evacuated.

South-Sudan

In December 2013, the South Sudanese Civil War was deteriorating. Therefore, multiple Western countries commenced evacuation operations. On 19 December 2013, a Royal Netherlands Air Force KDC-10 flew from Afghanistan to the Ethiopian capital of Addis Abeba. A second plane, a C-130 Hercules, transported two commando teams to the area. A day later, the evacuation detachment extracted 80 persons via airlift, of which half were Dutch nationals, from the South-Sudanese capital of Juba.

Afghanistan

From 16 August 2021 onwards, the KCT was involved in the evacuation of embassy personnel, Afghan interpreters and other Afghans who worked for the Dutch state out of Kabul. After the Fall of Kabul and the consecutive reign of the Taliban, commandos cooperated with NLMARSOF and BSB operators, 336 Squadron of the Royal Netherlands Air Force as well as personnel of various ministries to conduct a large-scale non-combatant evacuation operation. During the NEO commandos operated from Hamid Karzai International Airport, which was surrounded by a large crowd. Despite the harrowing circumstances, KCT operators aided the evacuation of over 2,500 people.

== Equipment ==
=== Weaponry ===
Name	Origin	Type	Caliber	Photo	Details
Glock 17M	Austria	Semi-automatic pistol	9×19mm Parabellum		Standard service pistol. "M" stands for Maritime springs cups. Equipped with Surefire X300.
Heckler & Koch HK416	Germany	Carbine	5.56×45mm NATO		Standard service carbine.
Heckler & Koch HK417	Germany	Battle rifle/ Designated marksman rifle	7.62×51mm NATO		Designated marksman rifle.
FN Minimi	Belgium	Light machine gun	5.56×45mm NATO		Standard light machine gun.
FN MAG	Belgium	General-purpose machine gun	7.62×51mm NATO		Standard general-purpose machine gun.
M2HB-QCB	United States	Heavy machine gun	.50 BMG		Standard heavy machine gun.
Accuracy International AWM	United Kingdom	Sniper rifle	.338 Lapua Magnum		Standard anti-personnel sniper rifle.
Accuracy International AXMC	United Kingdom	Sniper rifle	.338 Lapua Magnum		Successor of the Accuracy International AWM.
Barrett M82A1	United States	Anti-materiel rifle	.50 BMG		Standard anti-materiel sniper rifle.
Mossberg M590A1	United States	Shotgun	12 gauge		Used for door breaching.
M320 Grenade Launcher Module	United States; Germany	Grenade launcher	40mm grenade		Can be mounted under HK416 carbines or be separately fired.
Heckler & Koch AGW	Germany	Automatic grenade launcher	40mm grenade		Automatic grenade launcher, both man-portable and vehicle-fitted versions in use.
M72A3 LAW	United States	Anti-tank rocket launcher	66mm		Only used by the KCT due to the low weight and compact handling of the weapon. Used to great effect against improvised armored vehicles and fighting positions during the Dutch presence in Afghanistan (ISAF).
Panzerfaust 3	Germany	Rocket propelled grenade	110mm		Equipped with ''Dynarange'' system, allows targets to be engaged during all weather conditions, speed and day/night conditions at a maximum range of 900 meters. Can also be used to target hovering helicopters.
Spike	Israel	Anti-tank missile	170mm		Standard anti-tank guided missile.

=== Vehicles ===
Name	Origin	Type	Number	Photo	Notes
Bushmaster	Australia	Mine-resistant ambush protected	16		Eleven infantry mobility vehicles fitted with a M2 Browning remote controlled weapon station and five ambulance vehicles for casualty evacuations. The Bushmasters are part of a joint special operations forces vehicle pool under direct command of the Chief of Defence, both the KCT and NLMARSOF have access to the vehicles for their deployments.
Defenture VECTOR	Netherlands	Air Transportable Tactical Vehicle	75		Purpose-built special operations vehicle designed and built for the KCT by the Dutch manufacturer Defenture. The vehicle can be transported both inside and underslung a CH-47 Chinook transport helicopter, and is equipped with four-wheel steering for maximum mobility. In addition, equipment of the vehicle includes a M2 Browning heavy machine gun, two FN MAG general-purpose machine guns, modular ballistic protection and communications and jamming equipment.
Rigid Hull Inflatable Commando Craft (RHICC)	United Kingdom; Netherlands	Rigid inflatable boat	2		Attack watercraft used by the maritime warfare squads of the KCT for inland and coastal water operations. Equipped with two Volvo Penta engines (2 x 435 hp) resulting in a topspeed of 82 km/h. The craft is equipped with a Heckler & Koch AGW automatic grenade launcher or a M2 Browning heavy machine gun on the bow, two FN MAG general-purpose machine guns and two smoke grenade launchers. In addition, the RHICCs are fitted with a forward-looking infrared (FLIR) camera systems which can be used for target acquisition and reconnaissance for up to eight kilometres. The stern is adjusted for compatibility with smaller sized rigid inflatable boats.
Suzuki King Quad 750 AXI	Japan	All-terrain vehicle	60		Used for increased mobility, approachability for local populations and challenging terrain. Quads first saw action with the KCT during the Task Force 55 deployment. Consequently, they were widely used during long-range reconnaissance patrols in Mali as part of the MINUSMA deployment. They are often used by snipers and forward air controllers as their limited size and relatively quiet engines are well suited for clandestine operations. If needed, a FN MAG general-purpose machine gun can be fitted to the rear of the vehicle as well.
