= Brigade Speciale Beveiligingsopdrachten =

Dutch special forces

Special Security Missions Brigade
- Brigade Speciale Beveiligingsopdrachten (Dutch)
- Official BSB insignia
- Active: 1975–present
- Country: Netherlands
- Agency: Royal Marechaussee
- Type: Police tactical unit
- Role: Counterterrorism
- Operations jurisdiction: National; International
- Headquarters: Camp New Amsterdam, Huis ter Heide; 52°8′3″N 5°16′59″E
- Motto: Vigilans et Fortis; Vigilant and Forceful
- Abbreviation: BSB

Structure
- Operators: c. 400

Website
- Official page

The Brigade Speciale Beveiligingsopdrachten (BSB) (Special Security Missions Brigade) is the elite police tactical unit of the Royal Netherlands Marechaussee. Its missions include counter-terrorism, protection of government and military officials, and targeting organised crime.

Like many other European police tactical units, the BSB was established in 1975 following the Munich massacre. The unit was modeled after the GSG 9. Although the BSB conducts special operations, its missions are not planned by the Netherlands Special Operations Command (NLD SOCOM).

== Origin ==
Following the Munich massacre in 1972, many European nations decided to establish dedicated counter-terrorist units. The Netherlands were no exception and established multiple Bijzondere Bijstandseenheden (BBE) (English: Special Support Units). The tip of the spear was formed by the Bijzondere Bijstandseenheid Mariniers (BBE-M) (English: Special Support Unit Marines), currently named M-Squadron of the Netherlands Marine Corps, which was the primary domestic counter-terror unit. The Royal Marechaussee contributed to the BBEs by providing snipers. However, Royal Marechaussee high command foresaw the emergence of an operational gap. The BBEs could exclusively be deployed during terrorist threats, while regular police or Marechaussee personnel was not adequately trained or equipped to operate in high-risk settings. Therefore, the decision was made to establish the BSB under the command of the Royal Marechaussee. As such, the BSB could function as a figurative bridge between the regular police and the BBEs.

The first class of BSB operators was trained by the West German police tactical unit Grenzschutzgruppe 9 (GSG 9) in 1975. The unit achieved operational status in 1976 with 24 men. In the following years, the BSB focussed on providing personal security details to senior military officials (both Dutch and foreign) on domestic and foreign soil. In addition, the BSB was intensely involved with combating violent political activism during the 1980s, for example during the Vondelstraat riots.

In March 2017, news media reported that the BSB had taken over the personal security duties of threatened Dutch politician Geert Wilders after two officers of the personal security service of the National Police Corps had leaked sensitive information.

== Organisation ==
The BSB consists of three operational divisions: the Security Division, the Observation Team and the Arrest Team. Since 2015, the BSB is based in a new headquarters on the former United States Air Force air base Camp New Amsterdam in Huis ter Heide.

=== Security Division ===
The primary task of the Security Division is providing personal security details to (military) dignitaries, both Dutch and foreign. The bodyguards of the BSB cooperate closely with officers of the Dienst Koninklijke en Diplomatieke Beveiliging (DKDB) (English: Royal and Diplomatic Security Service) of the National Police who receive similar training. Compared to the DKDB, the BSB is particularly dedicated to operating in high-risk locations. For example, the BSB provides security to both the ambassadors and the embassies in countries such as Iraq and Afghanistan.

In addition to personal security details, the BSB conducts a wide range of other special security operations. The brigade is responsible for providing security during money and gold transports of the De Nederlandsche Bank, the Dutch central bank. In addition, the BSB runs the sky marshal program which has been active since 2004. Non-uniformed BSB operators regularly travel aboard passenger flights which have been indicated as to carrying a potential terrorist threat.

=== Observation Team ===
The Observatieteam (OT) (English: Observation Team) is deployed when the public prosecutor has approved an order for structural observation. The legal frameworks for such observations are codified in the Dutch Code of Criminal Procedures and the Special Investigative Powers Act. Additionally, the Observation Team of the BSB conduct observations on behalf of the General Intelligence and Security Service (AIVD). As opposed to their AIVD counterparts, BSB OT personnel is always armed.

The OT distinguishes 'structural' and 'dynamic' observations. Structural observation consists of covert observation of individuals in order in to gain insight into their pattern of life. These operations are usually accompanied by the interception of telecommunications. Dynamic observations are usually conducted by teams consisting of 7 to 10 operators using vehicles, on foot or from one or multiple static locations. For dynamic observations which require motorised vehicles, the BSB has a large and diverse fleet of civilian vehicles at its disposal. The discrete operation of these cars and motorcycle is taught by the training and education division during a specialised driving course.

=== Arrest Team ===
The BSB has fielded an independent police tactical unit, known as Arrestatieteam (AT) (Arrest Team), since 1994. The AT is tasked with conducting the arrests of armed suspects, combating organised crime and neutralising other life-threatening situations for which the regular police or Marechaussee are not adequately equipped or trained. The BSB has made this AT available to the Dienst Speciale Interventies (DSI) of the National Police. While the AT of the BSB resided under command of the DSI during operations, formally it is not part of the DSI. In addition, the brigade provides operators to the Unit Intervention, which is a mixed DSI unit consisting of both police and military operators, and the Rapid Response Teams of the DSI. Compared to the ATs of the DSI, the AT of the BSB is more often deployed for raids related to criminal investigations of the Investigations Branch of the Marechaussee. Due to the BSB being a military unit, the brigade can also be deployed for the arrest of personnel of the Netherlands Armed Forces.

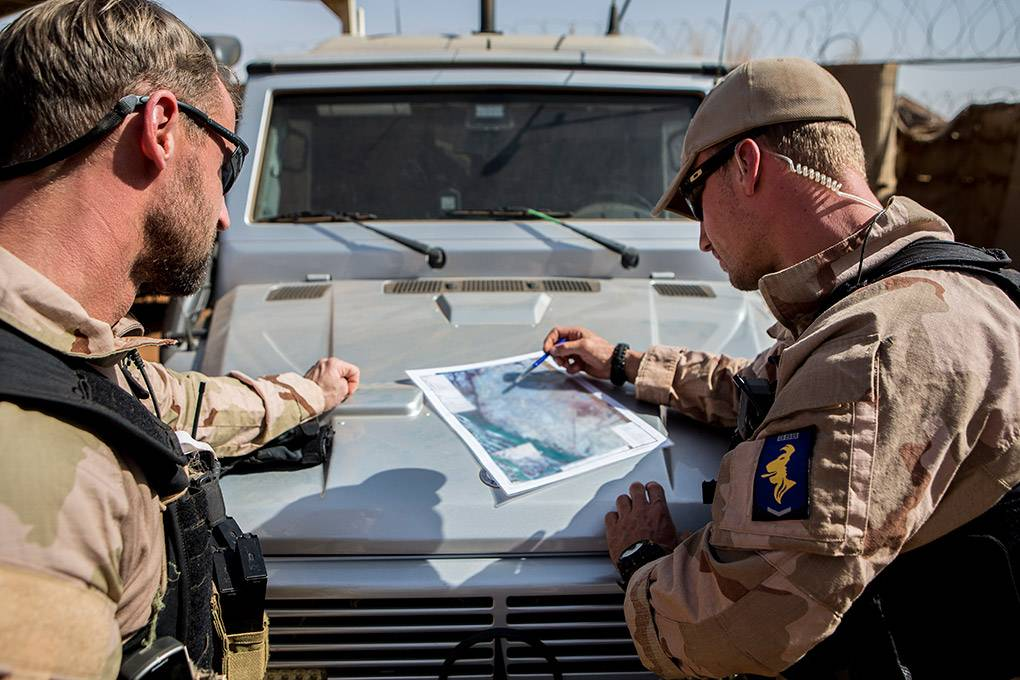
Personal security detail of a dignitary in Mali, in 2016

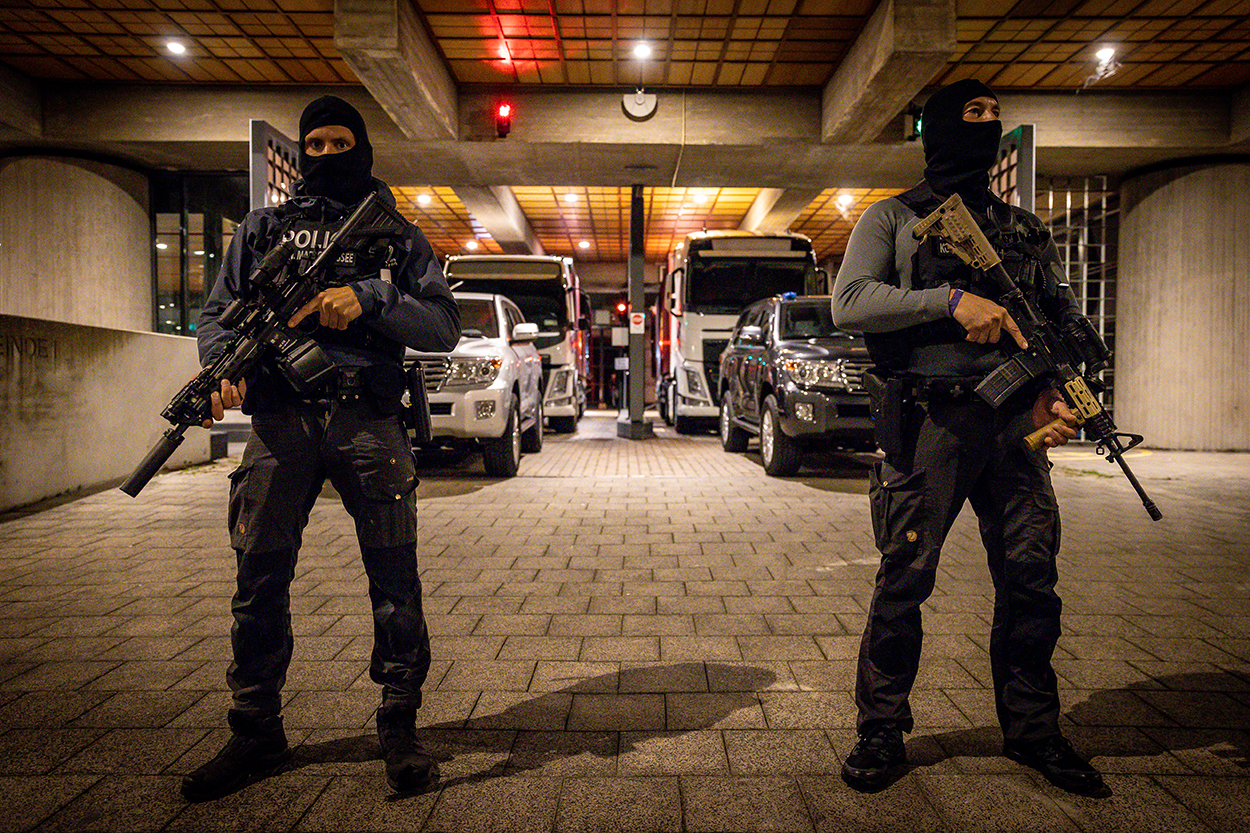
BSB operators at the DNB during a gold transfer in Amsterdam

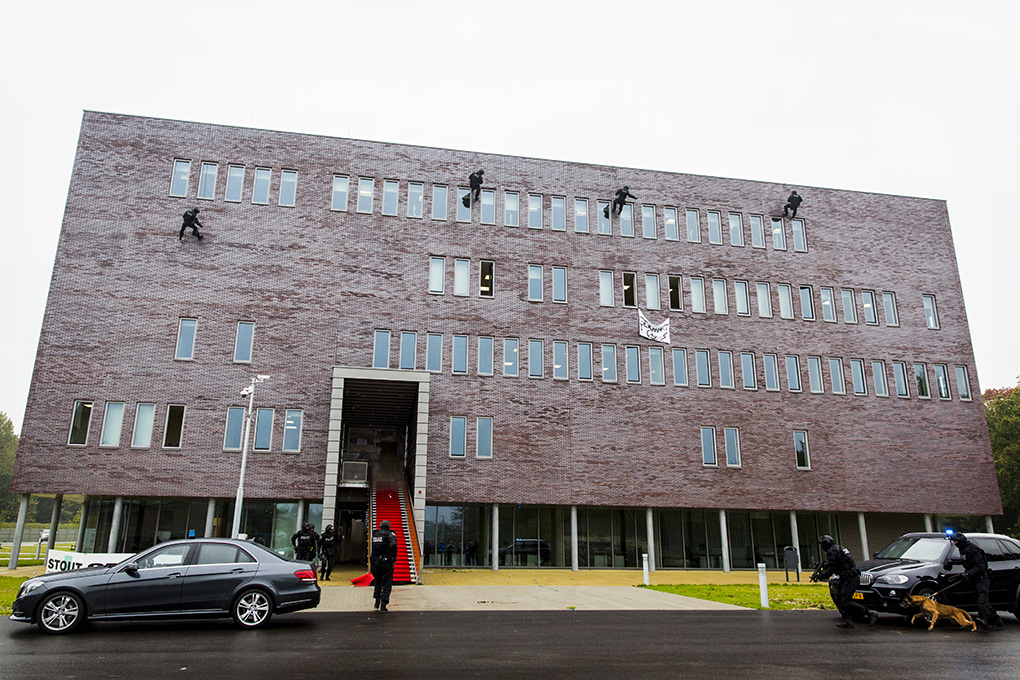
BSB operators abseiling from the roof of the new headquarters at Camp New Amsterdam, in 2015

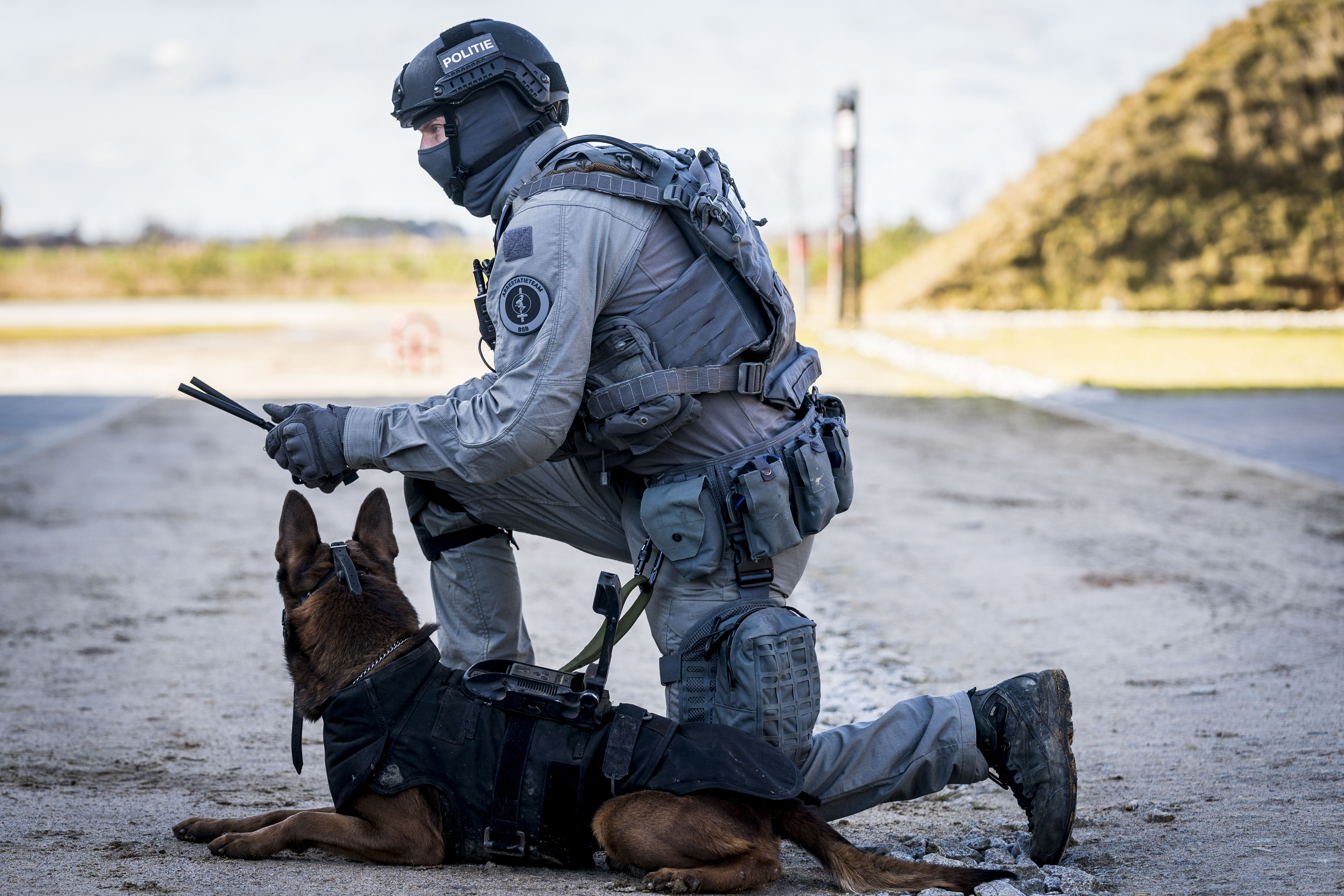
BSB Arrest Team dog handler during training in Poland

== Equipment ==
=== Weaponry ===
- Pistols: Glock 17 and Glock 26
- Submachine Guns: MP5, MP7, and FN P90
- Shotguns: Mossberg 590A1.
- Assault Rifles: HK 416, HK 417 and SIG MCX (chambered in .300 AAC Blackout and 5.56×45mm NATO).
- Machine Guns: FN Minimi.
- Sniper Rifles: Accuracy International rifles (chambered in .308 Winchester and .338 Lapua Magnum).

=== Vehicles ===
The BSB has access to a wide range of vehicles, some of which are armoured. A selection of vehicles known to be in use:

- Audi A6
- Audi A8
- BMW 5 Series
- BMW 7 Series
- BMW X5
- Mercedes-Benz E-Class
- Mercedes-Benz S-Class
- Mercedes-Benz G-Class
- Toyota Land Cruiser

== Bibliography ==
- Herzog, Martin (2025). GSG 9: From Munich to Mogadishu - The Birth of Germany's Counterterrorism Force. Casemate. ISBN 978-1636245737.
- Neville, Leigh (2017). European Counter-Terrorist Units 1972–2017. Oxford: Osprey Publishing. ISBN 978-1472825278.
- Schmid, Alex P.; Crelinsten, Ronald D., eds. (1993). Western Responses to Terrorism. Routledge. ISBN 978-0714645216.
