= Netherlands Special Operations Command =

Joint special military forces of the Netherlands

- Emblem of NLD SOCOM
- Active: 5 December 2018; 7 years ago
- Country: Netherlands
- Type: Joint command Special operations forces
- Role: Special operations
- Part of: Chief of Defence
- HQ: The Hague
- Nickname: NLD SOCOM

Commanders
- Current commander: Major general Ron Smits

The Netherlands Special Operations Command (NLD SOCOM) is a joint command of the Netherlands Armed Forces which is responsible for the planning, command and control, execution and evaluation of all operations conducted by the Dutch special operations forces (SOF), the Korps Commandotroepen (KCT) and the Netherlands Maritime Special Operations Forces (NLMARSOF).

== History ==
The establishment of a joint command that would unify the SOF units of the armed forces had been subject of debate for numerous years. The increasing demand for the deployment of SOF added in the 15 years prior to the establishment of a joint command added to this discussion. Therefore, a task force SOCOM was established in 2017 under the command of lieutenant general Hans Wehren which was due to transform into an operational command. On 5 December 2018, the command was formally founded with a ceremony at Gilze-Rijen Air Base. NLD SOCOM reached full operational capability on 2 October 2020.

== Organisation ==
NLD SOCOM is an operational staff and placed under direct command of the Chief of Defence due to the strategic impact of its operations. Although NLD SOCOM is responsible for deployments, the SOF units (KCT and NLMARSOF) administratively remain part of their respective branches, the Royal Netherlands Army and the Royal Netherlands Navy.

NLD SOCOM cooperates closely with the special operations commands of Denmark (SOKOM) and Belgium (SOR) in the Composite Special Operations Component Command (C-SOCC). The C-SOCC is a tri-national NATO expeditionary SOF headquarters; in 2021 the C-SOCC is responsible for all SOF efforts of the NATO Response Force (NRF21). Within the C-SOCC, the Netherlands is the lead nation of the Composite Special Operations Air Task Group (C-SOATG). In addition, the Netherlands and Belgium will provide a joint Composite Special Operations Maritime Task Group (C-SOMG) in 2026.

The three primary units currently operating under NLD SOCOM command are:

- Korps Commandotroepen (KCT): the SOF of the Royal Netherlands Army.
- Netherlands Maritime Special Operations Forces (NLMARSOF): the SOF of the Netherlands Marine Corps of the Royal Netherlands Navy
- 300 Squadron: squadron of the Defence Helicopter Command of the Royal Netherlands Air Force which is equipped with Eurocopter Cougar AS 532U2 medium transport helicopters. 300 Squadron is due to develop into the primary helicopter unit of NLD SOCOM as SOF AIR
