= Structure of the Royal Netherlands Army =

- Flag of the Royal Netherlands Army
- Founded: 1814

The current structure of the Royal Netherlands Army is as follows:

== Organization ==
=== Organization graphic ===
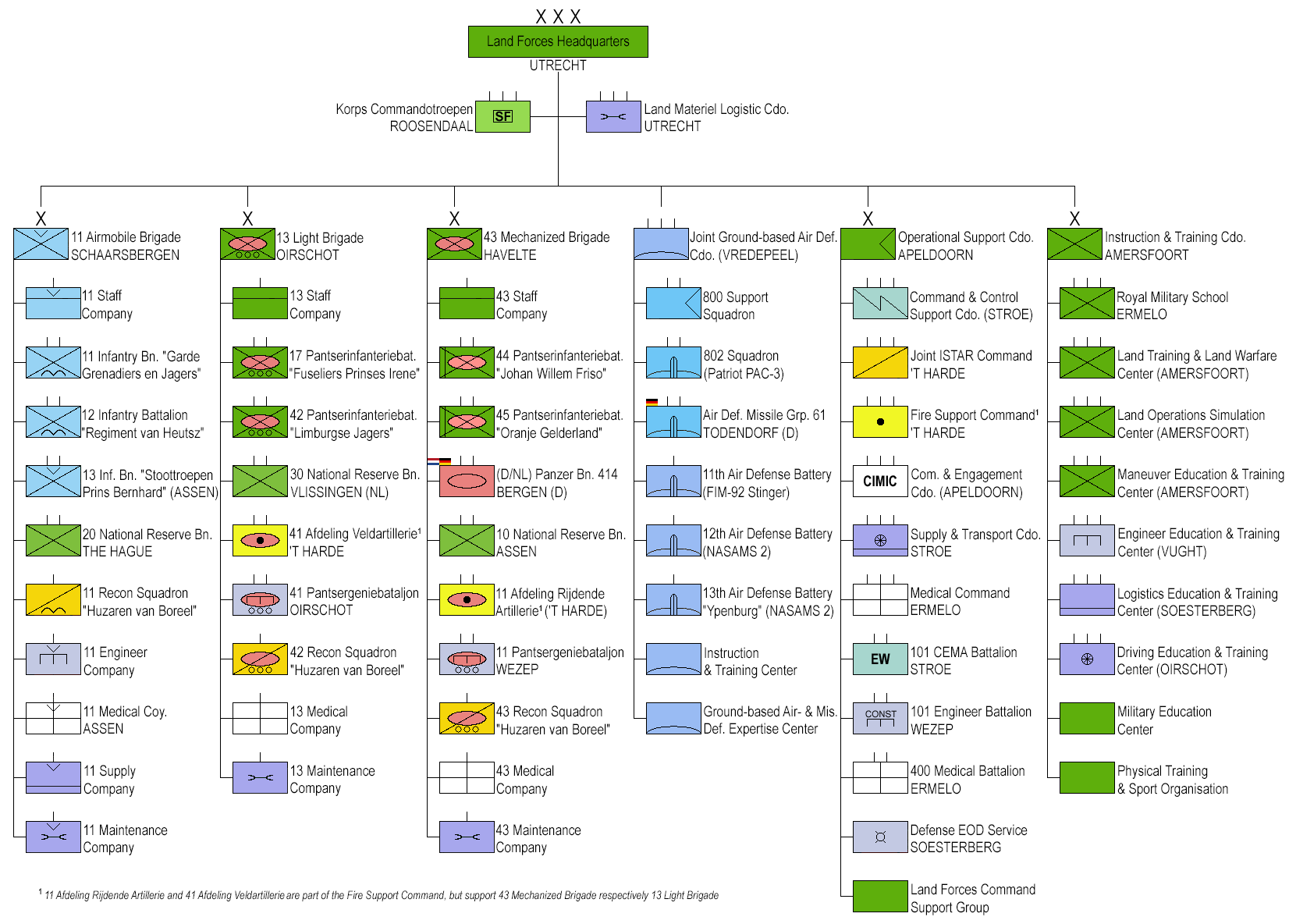
Royal Netherlands Army organization as of March 2026 (click to enlarge)

=== Land Forces Headquarters ===
The Land Forces Headquarters (Dutch: Hoofdkwartier landmacht) is based at the Kromhoutkazerne in Utrecht and consists of the following departments:

- Land Forces Headquarters, in Utrecht
  - Land Forces Command Staff (Staf Commando Landstrijdkrachten)
    - Training & Operations Directorate (Directie Training & Operatiën)
    - Personnel & Organisation Directorate (Directie Personeel & Organisatie)
    - Materiel & Services Directorate (Directie Materieel & Diensten)
  - Army Council (Landmachtraad)
  - Land Forces Commander Cabinet (Kabinet)
  - Staff Group (Stafgroep)
  - Finance & Controlling Department (Afdeling Financiën en Control)

==== 11 Airmobile Brigade ====
The 11 Airmobile Brigade (Dutch: 11 Luchtmobiele Brigade) is a rapidly deployable air manoeuvre infantry brigade integrated into the Rapid Forces Division (German: Division Schnelle Kräfte) of the German Army since 2014. The brigade is based In the northern (Assen) and central part (Arnhem area) of the Netherlands and consists of the following units:

- 11 Airmobile Brigade (11 Luchtmobiele Brigade), in Schaarsbergen
  - 11 Staff Company (11 Stafcompagnie), in Schaarsbergen
  - 11 Infantry Battalion (Air Assault) "Garderegiment Grenadiers en Jagers" (11 Infanteriebataljon (Air Assault) "Garderegiment Grenadiers en Jagers"), in Schaarsbergen (Airborne operations)
    - A, B, C and D Company
  - 12 Infantry Battalion (Air Assault) "Regiment van Heutsz" (12 Infanteriebataljon (Air Assault) "Regiment van Heutsz"), in Schaarsbergen (SOF Support)
    - A, B, C and D Company
  - 13 Infantry Battalion (Air Assault) "Regiment Stoottroepen Prins Bernhard" (13 Infanteriebataljon (Air Assault) "Regiment Stoottroepen Prins Bernhard"), in Assen
    - A, B, C and D Company
  - 20 Infantry Battalion (20 Infanteriebataljon) National Reserve Corps, in The Hague
    - Alpha Company (Alfa-compagnie), in The Hague
    - Bravo Company (Bravo-compagnie), in Bergen
    - Charlie Company (Charlie-compagnie), in Badhoevedorp
    - Delta Company (Delta-compagnie), in The Hague
    - Echo Company (Echo-compagnie), in Stroe
    - Foxtrot Company (Foxtrot-compagnie), in Schaarsbergen
  - 11 Brigade Reconnaissance Squadron "Regiment Huzaren van Boreel" (11 Brigade Verkenningseskadron "Regiment Huzaren van Boreel"), in Schaarsbergen
    - Pathfinder Platoon (Pathfinderpeloton), in Schaarsbergen
  - 11 Engineer Company (11 Geniecompagnie), in Schaarsbergen
  - 11 Medical Company (11 Geneeskundige compagnie), in Assen
  - 11 Supply Company (11 Bevoorradingscompagnie), in Schaarsbergen
  - 11 Maintenance Company (11 Herstelcompagnie), in Schaarsbergen and Assen

==== 13 Light Brigade ====
The 13 Light Brigade (Dutch: 13 Lichte Brigade) is a motorized brigade integrated into the 10th Panzer Division of the German Army. The brigade operates the Boxer armored fighting vehicle and the Bushmaster infantry mobility vehicle. The brigade is based in Oirschot and consists of the following units:

- 13 Light Brigade (13 Lichte Brigade), in Oirschot
  - 13 Staff Company (13 Stafcompagnie), in Oirschot
  - 17 Armored Infantry Battalion "Garderegiment Fuseliers Prinses Irene" (17 Pantserinfanteriebataljon "Garderegiment Fuseliers Prinses Irene"), in Oirschot
    - A, B, C and D Company, with Boxer armored fighting vehicles
  - 42 Armored Infantry Battalion "Regiment Limburgse Jagers" (42 Pantserinfanteriebataljon "Regiment Limburgse Jagers"), in Oirschot
    - A, B, C and D Company, with Boxer armored fighting vehicles
  - 30 Infantry Battalion (30 Infanteriebataljon) National Reserve Corps, in Vlissingen
    - Alpha Company (Alfa-compagnie), in Vlissingen
    - Bravo Company (Bravo-compagnie), in Breda
    - Charlie Company (Charlie-compagnie), in Oirschot
    - Delta Company (Delta-compagnie), in Brunssum
    - Echo Company (Echo-compagnie), in Vredepeel
  - 41 Armored Engineer Battalion (41 Pantsergeniebataljon), in Oirschot
    - Staff Company
    - 411 and 412 Armored Engineer Company (411, 412 Pantsergeniecompagnie)
    - Multi Role Engineer Company
  - 42 Brigade Reconnaissance Squadron "Regiment Huzaren van Boreel" (42 Brigade Verkenningseskadron "Regiment Huzaren van Boreel"), in Oirschot, with Fennek reconnaissance vehicles
  - 13 Medical Company (13 Geneeskundige Compagnie), in Oirschot
  - 13 Maintenance Company (13 Herstelcompagnie), in Oirschot
  - Robotics & Autonomous Systems Cell (Robotica en Autonome Systemen cel), in Oirschot

==== 43 Mechanized Brigade ====
The 43 Mechanized Brigade (Dutch: 43 Gemechaniseerde Brigade) is a Mechanized brigade integrated into the 1st Panzer Division of the German Army. Armored vehicles, such as the CV90 infantry fighting vehicle and the Leopard 2 main battle tank, are at the core of the brigade. The brigade is based, with the exception of the 414 Panzer Battalion and 11 Armored Engineer Battalion, in Havelte and consists of the following units:

- 43 Mechanized Brigade (43 Gemechaniseerde Brigade), in Havelte
  - 43 Staff Company (43 Stafcompagnie), in Havelte
  - 44 Armored Infantry Battalion "Regiment Infanterie Johan Willem Friso" (44 Pantserinfanteriebataljon "Regiment Infanterie Johan Willem Friso"), in Havelte
    - A, B, C and D Company, with CV9035NL MLU infantry fighting vehicles
  - 45 Armored Infantry Battalion "Regiment Infanterie Oranje Gelderland" (45 Pantserinfanteriebataljon "Regiment Infanterie Oranje Gelderland"), in Havelte (Will move to Soesterberg in 2027)
    - A, B, C and D Company, with CV9035NL MLU infantry fighting vehicles
  - Regiment Huzaren Prinses Catharina-Amalia
    - Mounted Units Regimental Fanfare (Regimentsfanfare Bereden Wapens)
    - Honorary Cavalry Escort (Cavalerie Ere Escorte)
    - 414 Tank Battalion (414 Tankbataljon, mixed German Army and Royal Netherlands Army unit), in Bergen (Germany)
      - 1st Staff and Support Squadron (1e Staf- en verzorgingseskadron)
      - 2nd (German), 3rd (German), 4th (Dutch) and 5th (Reserve) (German) Tank Squadron, with Leopard 2A7 main battle tanks
  - 10 Infantry Battalion (10 Infanteriebataljon) National Reserve Corps, in Assen
    - Alpha Company (Alfa-compagnie), in Assen, Zoutkamp, and Leeuwarden
    - Bravo Company (Bravo-compagnie), in Assen and Havelte
    - Charlie Company (Charlie-compagnie), in Wezep and Bathmen
    - Delta Company (Delta-compagnie), in Amersfoort
    - Echo Company (Echo-compagnie), in Amersfoort
    - Foxtrot Company (Foxtrot-compagnie), in Enschede and Eibergen
  - 11 Armored Engineer Battalion (11 Pantsergeniebataljon), in Wezep
    - Staff Company
    - 111 and 112 Armored Engineer Company (111, 112 Pantsergeniecompagnie)
    - Multi Role Engineer Company
  - 43 Brigade Reconnaissance Squadron "Regiment Huzaren van Boreel" (43 Brigade Verkenningseskadron "Regiment Huzaren van Boreel"), in Havelte, with Fennek reconnaissance vehicles
  - 43 Medical Company (43 Geneeskundige Compagnie), in Havelte
  - 43 Maintenance Company (43 Herstelcompagnie), in Havelte and Wezep

==== Korps Commandotroepen ====
The Korps Commandotroepen is the special operations force of the Royal Netherlands Army and based in Roosendaal. It consists of the following units:

- Korps Commandotroepen, in Roosendaal
  - Staff and Support Company (Stafverzorgingscompagnie)
  - Special Operations Education and Training Company (Opleidings- en trainingscompagnie speciale operaties (OTCSO))
  - 102nd Company (102 Compagnie)
  - 103rd Commando Troops Company (103 Commandotroepencompagnie)
  - 104th Commando Troops Company (104 Commandotroepencompagnie)
  - 105th Commando Troops Company (105 Commandotroepencompagnie)
  - 108th Commando Troops Company (108 Commandotroepencompagnie)

==== 1 (German/Netherlands) Corps ====
The 1 (German/Netherlands) Corps is based in Münster and has additional locations in Eibergen and Garderen. The Corps is a NATO-assigned headquarters for land operations that is led in turns by Germany and the Netherlands. It is capable of commanding a multinational force of approximately 50,000 troops. It consists of the following bi-national units:

- 1 (German/Netherlands) Corps, in Münster (Germany)
  - Headquarters, in Münster
  - Staff Support Battalion, in Münster
  - Communication & Information Systems Battalion, in Eibergen and Garderen

==== Joint Ground-based Air Defence Command ====
The Joint Ground-based Air Defence Command (Dutch: Defensie Grondgebonden Luchtverdedigingscommando) is a joint command, consisting of both army and Royal Netherlands Air Force personnel, that is responsible for the protection of both Dutch and allied territory, vital objects and military units from airplanes, helicopters, cruise missiles, ballistic missiles and drones. In 2018 the Flugabwehrraketengruppe 61 of the German Air Force was integrated into the command. The command is based, with the exception of the Flugabwehrraketengruppe 61, at the Lieutenant General Best Barracks in Vredepeel and consists of the following units:

- Joint Ground-based Air Defence Command, in Vredepeel
  - 11th Air Defence Battery (11 Luchtverdedigingsbatterij)
    - Stinger MANPAD platoon, with shoulder launched FIM-92 Stinger missile
    - Counter-UAS-platoon, with SkyWall Patrol
  - 12th Air Defence Battery (12 Luchtverdedigingsbatterij)
    - NASAMS Platoon (NASAMS-peloton), with NASAMS 2 medium range surface-to-air missiles and AN/MPQ-64 radar systems
    - Stinger Platoon (Stinger-peloton), with Fennek-mounted FIM-92 Stinger short range surface-to-air missiles and Multi Mission Radar systems
    - Counter Rocket, Artillery, and Mortar Platoon (Counter Rockets, Artillery and Mortar-peloton)
    - Logistics Platoon (Logistiek peloton)
  - 13th Air Defence Battery 'Ypenburg' (13 Luchtverdedigingsbatterij 'Ypenburg')
    - NASAMS Platoon (NASAMS-peloton), with NASAMS 2 medium range surface-to-air missiles and AN/MPQ-64 radar systems
    - Stinger Platoon (Stinger-peloton), with Fennek-mounted FIM-92 Stinger short range surface-to-air missiles and Multi Mission Radar systems
    - Counter Rocket, Artillery, and Mortar Platoon (Counter Rockets, Artillery and Mortar-peloton)
    - Logistics Platoon (Logistiek peloton)
  - 800 Support Squadron (800 Ondersteuningssquadron)
    - Communication and Information Systems Flight (CIS-vlucht)
    - Logistics Flight (Logistieke vlucht)
    - Force Protection Flight (Force Protection-vlucht)
  - 802 Patriot Squadron (802 Patriot-squadron)
    - Command and Control Flight(Commandovoeringsvlucht)
    - 4× Patriot flights (Patriot-vlucht), with Patriot long range surface-to-air missiles (4th flight was activated July 1st 2024)
    - Logistics Flight (Logistieke vlucht)
  - German Air Defence Missile Group 61 (Flugabwehrraketengruppe 61), in Todendorf (Germany)
    - Headquarters und Staff Squadron, with LÜR radar systems
    - 3× LeFlaSys squadron, with Wiesel 2 LeFlaSys short range surface-to-air missiles
    - Mantis Squadron, with MANTIS very short-range protection systems
    - Training Squadron
  - Education and Training Center (Opleidings- en Trainingscentrum)
  - Ground-based Air- and Missile Defence Expertise Center (Kenniscentrum Grondgebonden Lucht- en Raketverdediging)

==== Operational Support Command Land ====
The Operational Support Command Land (Dutch: Operationeel Ondersteuningscommando Land) provides a broad range of specialist support to the army, and is based in Apeldoorn. The command is the largest unit of the army. It consists of the following units:

- Operational Support Command Land, in Apeldoorn
  - Command & Control Support Command (Command & Control Ondersteuningscommando), in Stroe
    - Staff Company (Stafcompagnie)
    - A, B and C Signal Company
    - Signals Service School
  - Joint ISTAR Command (Joint ISTAR Commando), in 't Harde
    - Staff Squadron (Stafeskadron)
    - 102 Electronic Warfare Company (102 Elektronische Oorlogsvoering compagnie)
    - 104 JISTARC Reconnaissance Squadron (104 JISTARC Verkenningseskadron), with Fennek light armoured reconnaissance vehicles
    - 105 Field HUMINT Squadron (105 Field Humint-eskadron)
    - 106 Intelligence Squadron (106 Inlichtingeneskadron)
    - 107 Aerial Systems Battery (107 Aerial Systems Batterij), with RQ-11B DDL Raven, Q-27 ScanEagle, RQ-21A Integrator unmanned aerial vehicles
    - 108 Technical Exploitation Intelligence Company (108 Technical Exploitation Intelligence-compagnie)
    - 109 Open-source Intelligence Company (109 Open Sources Intelligence-compagnie)
  - Fire Support Command (Vuursteun Commando), in 't Harde
    - 11 Horse Artillery Battalion (11 Afdeling Rijdende Artillerie; supports the 43 Mechanised Brigade)
      - Staff Battery (Stafbatterij)
      - 2× Batteries, with Panzerhaubitze 2000 self-propelled howitzers
      - 1× Battery, with PULS multiple rocket launchers
      - Sensor Platoon, with 6× Thales Nederland GM 200 MM/C
    - 41 Field Artillery Battalion (41 Afdeling Veldartillerie; supports the 13 Light Brigade)
      - Staff Battery (Stafbatterij)
      - 2× Batteries, with Panzerhaubitze 2000 self-propelled howitzers
      - 1× Battery, with PULS multiple rocket launchers
      - Sensor Platoon, with 6× Thales Nederland GM 200 MM/C
    - Fire Support School (Vuursteunschool)
    - Artillery Fire Range (Artillerieschietkamp)
    - Expertise Center (Expertisecentrum)
  - Communication & Engagement Command (Communicatie & Engagement Commando), in Apeldoorn
  - Supply and Transport Command (Bevoorrading en Transport Commando), in Stroe
    - Staff Company (Stafcompagnie)
    - 110 and 220 Transport Company (Transportcompagnie)
    - 130 and 230 Base Company (Clustercompagnie)
    - 140 Heavy Transport Company (140 Zwaar Transportcompagnie)
    - 210 Regional Transport Company (210 Regionale Vervoerscompagnie)
    - 240 Service Company (240 Dienstencompagnie)
    - Forward Support Detachement Zuid (future support company for 13 Light Brigade).
  - 101 Cyber & Electromagnetic Activities (CEMA) Battalion (101 CEMA-bataljon), in Stroe
    - Staff Company (Stafcompagnie)
    - Cyber & Electric Magnetic Activities Company (Cyber- en elektromagnetische capaciteit (CEMA) compagnie)
  - 101 Engineer Battalion (101 Geniebataljon), in Wezep
    - 101 Staff Company (101 Stafcompagnie)
    - 102 and 103 Construction Company (Constructiecompagnieën)
    - 105 Hydraulic Engineer Company (105 Geniecompagnie Waterbouw)
  - Land Forces Command Support Group (Ondersteuningsgroep CLAS), in Arnhem
    - Royal Military Band "Johan Willem Friso" (Koninklijke Militaire Kapel "Johan Willem Friso)
    - Regimental Fanfare Garde Grenadiers en Jagers (Regimentsfanfare Garde Grenadiers en Jagers)
    - National Reserve Korps Fanfare (Fanfare Korps Nationale Reserve)
    - Defense Geography Service (Dienst Geografie Defensie)
    - Military Penitentiary Center (Militair Penitentiair Centrum)
    - Individual Transmission Office - Security Sector Reform (Bureau Individuele Uitzendingen - Security Sector Reform)
    - Internal [Security] Service (Interne Dienstverlening)
    - Military Court (Militaire Rechtbank)
  - Medical Command (Geneeskundig Commando), in Ermelo
    - Military Healthcare Land Forces Command (Militaire Gezondheidszorg CLAS)
    - Expertise Center (Expertisecentrum)
  - 400 Medical Battalion (400 Geneeskundig Bataljon), in Ermelo
    - Staff & Support Company (Staf & Ondersteuningscompagnie)
    - 420, 421, 422 and 423 Hospital Company (Hospitaalcompagnie)
  - Defense Explosive Ordnance Disposal Service (Explosieven Opruimingsdienst Defensie), in Soesterberg
    - EOD School (EOD School), in Soesterberg
    - EOD Expertise Center (EOD Kenniscentrum), in Soesterberg
    - Land-based EOD Company (Grondgebonden EOD Compagnie), in Soesterberg
    - Maritime EOD Company (Maritieme EOD Compagnie), in Den Helder

==== Land Materiel Logistic Command ====
The Land Materiel Logistic Command (Dutch: Materieellogistiek Commando Land) is responsible for the maintenance and conservation of land systems and provides advice for the procurement of new materiel. It consists of the following units:

- Land Materiel Logistic Command, in Utrecht
  - 300 Equipment Logistics Company (300 Materieellogistieke Compagnie), in Amersfoort
  - Technical Department (Afdeling Techniek), in Leusden
  - Logistics Department (Afdeling Logistiek), in Lettele
  - Systems and Analysis Department (Afdeling Systemen & Analyse), in Utrecht
  - Equipment Maintenance Organization (Materiel Maintenance Organization, maintains the US Army equipment stored in South Limburg)

==== Education and Training Command ====
The Education and Training Command (Dutch: Opleidings- en Trainingscommando) is based in Amersfoort and provides training and courses to the land forces. It consists of the following units:

- Education and Training Command, in Amersfoort
  - Royal Military School (Koninklijke Militaire School), in Ermelo
    - School North (School Noord), in Assen
    - School South (School Zuid), in Oirschot
    - Airmobile School (School Luchtmobiel), in Arnhem
  - Land Training Center and Land Warfare Center (Land Training Centre en Land Warfare Centre), in Amersfoort
  - Land Operations Simulation Center (Simulatiecentrum Landoptreden), in Amersfoort
  - Maneuver Education and Training Center (Opleidings- en Trainingscentrum Manoeuvre), in Amersfoort
    - Maneuver School (Manoeuvreschool)
    - Shooting Training School (Schiet Training School)
    - Signal School (School Verbindingsdienst)
    - Ground Air Cooperation School (School Grond Lucht Samenwerking)
    - Peace Missions School (School voor Vredesmissies)
    - Ground-based Maneuver Expertise Center (Kenniscentrum Grondgebonden Manoeuvre)
    - Military & Equipment Defense Expertise Center (Defensie Expertise Centrum Militair & Uitrusting)
    - Logistics Company (Logistieke compagnie)
  - Engineer Education and Training Center (Opleidings- en Trainingscentrum Genie), in Vught
    - Miners and Sappers School (Mineurs- en Sappeursschool), in Vught and Reek
    - Pioneer and Pontonnier School (Pioniers- en Pontonniersschool), in Vught, Hedel and Wezep
    - CBRN Defense Center (Defensie CBRN Centrum), in Vught
    - Engineer Expertise Center (Kenniscentrum Genie), in Vught
  - Logistics Education and Training Center (Opleidings- en Trainingscentrum Logistiek), in Soesterberg
  - Driving Education and Training Center (Opleidings- en Trainingscentrum Rijden), in Oirschot
  - Physical Training and Sport Organisation (Lichamelijke Oefening & Sportorganisatie), at various locations
  - Military Education Center (Centrum voor Militair Onderwijs), at various locations

==== National Reserve Corps ====

The National Reserve Corps (Dutch: Korps Nationale Reserve) provides support during large incidents. The reserve battalions are all integrated into one of the three combat brigades. It consists of the following units:

- 10th NATRES Battalion of the 43rd Mechanized Brigade. Area of operations is the north and the east of the Netherlands.
- 20th NATRES Battalion of the 11th Air Assault Brigade. Area of operations are the west and the centre of the Netherlands.
- 30th NATRES Battalion of the 13th Light Brigade. Area of operations is the south of the Netherlands.
