= Joint Ground-based Air Defence Command =

- Defensie Grondgebonden Luchtverdedigingscommando (DGLC)
- Emblem of the DGLC
- Founded: 29 March 2012
- Country: Netherlands
- Branch: Royal Netherlands Army
- Type: Air defence
- Size: c. 850 personnel
- Part of: Under command of the Commander of the Royal Netherlands Army
- Garrison/HQ: Lieutenant General Best Barracks in Venray
- Mottos: Verenigd op de grond, daadkrachtig in de lucht ("United on the ground, decisive in the air")

Commanders
- Current commander: Colonel Jos Kuijpers

The Joint Ground-based Air Defence Command (Dutch: Defensie Grondgebonden Luchtverdedigingscommando, DGLC) is a joint command of the Royal Netherlands Army, formed in 2012 after amalgamation of the Commando Luchtdoelartillerie (Anti-aircraft Artillery Command) of the Royal Netherlands Army and the Groep Geleide Wapens (Group Guided Weapons) of the Royal Netherlands Air Force. The command is responsible for all ground-based air defence tasks and consists of both army and air force personnel. The DGLC employs an integrated layered air-defence approach featuring FIM-92 Stinger, NASAMS II and MIM-104 Patriot systems.

== Units ==
=== 800 Support Squadron ===
The 800 Support Squadron (Dutch: 800 Ondersteuningssquadron) consists of a staff and three flights. The CIS flight is responsible for data and voice communication between the operational units. The logistic flight provides supply and transport services. The force protection flight guards and protects the operational units. and is responsible for the education and training of personnel, and the maintenance of materiel.

=== 802 Patriot Squadron ===
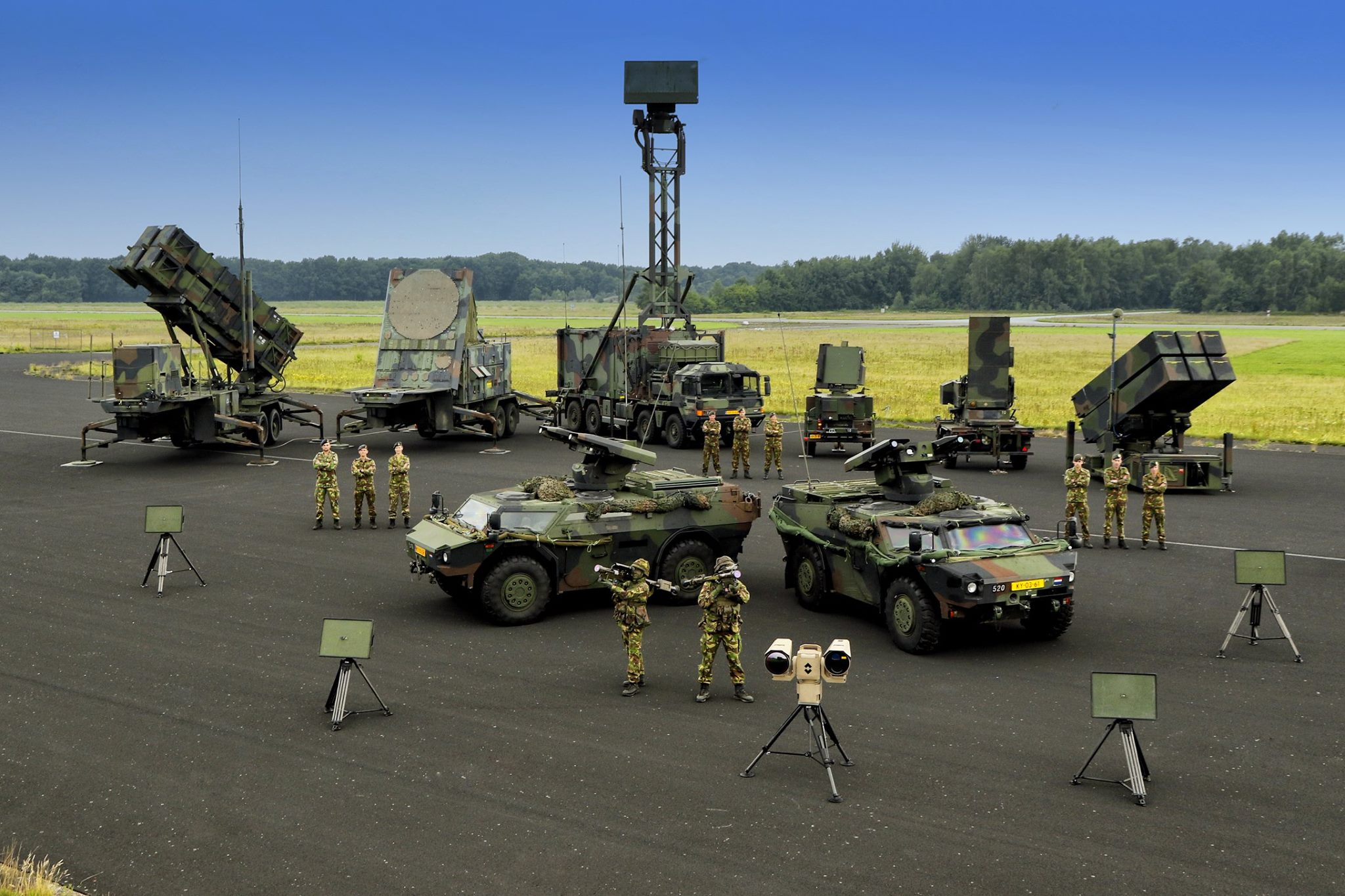
DGLC showcasing some of their systems, 2017.

802 Patriot Squadron is responsible for the deployment of the MIM-104 Patriot surface-to-air missile system. The squadron consists of a staff and six flights: a logistic flight, a command and control flight, and four Patriot flights each consisting of a complete fire unit. The fourth Flight was activated on July 1st 2024

=== 11 Air Defence Battery ===
The 11 Air Defence Battery (Dutch: 11 Luchtverdedigingsbatterij) was activated on June 1st 2023. The battery comprises a staff, a Counter-UAS platoon and a Stinger platoon.

=== 12 Air Defence Battery ===
The 12 Air Defence Battery (Dutch: 12 Luchtverdedigingsbatterij) consists of four platoons. Together with the 13 Air Defence Battery 'Ypenburg' the battery is responsible for short and medium range air defence. The battery comprises a staff, a signals group and four operational platoons:

- NASAMS Platoon, operates Hensoldt TRML-3D/32 and AN/MPQ-64 Sentinel radar systems, and the NASAMS 2 air defence system.
- Stinger Platoon, provides short range air defence with the Fennek Stinger Weapon Platform and shoulder-launched FIM-92 Stinger MANPADS.
- Counter rocket, artillery, and mortar (C-RAM) Platoon, responsible for detecting rockets, artillery, mortars and drones using the UDIS sensor system.
- Logistic Platoon, responsible for maintenance, supply and recovery of the units within the battery.

=== 13 Air Defence Battery 'Ypenburg' ===
The 13 Air Defence Battery 'Ypenburg' (Dutch: 13 Luchtverdedigingsbatterij 'Ypenburg') consists of four platoons. Together with the 12 Air Defence Battery the battery is responsible for short and medium range air defence. The battery comprises a staff, a signals group and four operational platoons:

- NASAMS Platoon, operates Hensoldt TRML-3D/32 and AN/MPQ-64 Sentinel radar systems, and the NASAMS 2 air defence system.
- Stinger Platoon, provides short range air defence with the Fennek Stinger Weapon Platform and shoulder-launched FIM-92 Stinger MANPADS.
- Counter rocket, artillery, and mortar (C-RAM) Platoon, responsible for detecting rockets, artillery, mortars and drones using the UDIS sensor system.
- Logistic Platoon, responsible for maintenance, supply and recovery of the units within the battery.

The battery received the name Ypenburg in 1999. This name symbolises the relationship with the 13 Air Defence Artillery Battery (Dutch: 13 Batterij Luchtdoelartillerie) which was tasked with the defence of the Dutch government, just north of Ypenburg Airport during the Battle for The Hague.

=== Air Defence Missile Group 61 ===
The Air Defence Missile Group 61 (German: Flugabwehrraketengruppe 61) is an air defence battalion of the German Air Force, consisting of approximately 300 personnel. The battery has been placed under Dutch command since 4 April 2018, and is fully integrated into the DGLC. The group operates radar-guided cannon and rocket SHORAD systems, and is based in Todendorf in Germany. Group 61 consists of a Mantis squadron, a LeFlaSys Squadron, a support squadron and a training squadron.

=== Education and Training Centre ===
The Education and Training Centre (Dutch: Opleidings- en Trainingscentrum) provides all air defence training, driving instruction and international training support. The centre operates a wide variety of advanced weapon simulators.

=== Ground-based Air Defence Research Centre ===
The Research Centre (Dutch: Kenniscentrum Grondgebonden Luchtverdediging) is responsible for obtaining, safeguarding and sharing knowledge concerning air and missile defence. This knowledge is used to shape the structure of the DGLC. In addition, the centre provides technical and tactical documentation and procedures, and supports and advices the Defence Materiel Organisation with the acquisition of new systems and materiel.

== Equipment ==
=== MIM-104 Patriot ===
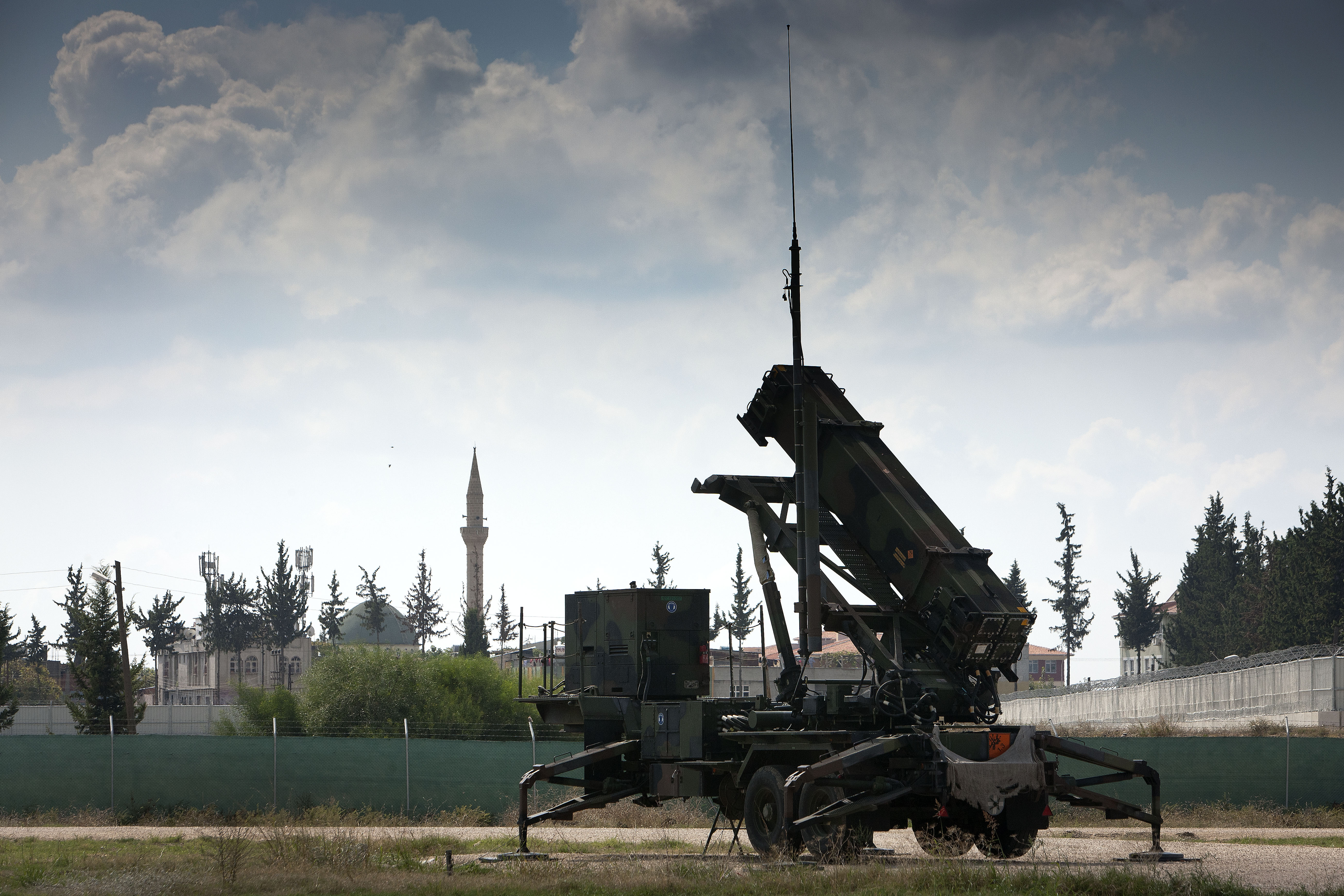
Patriot launcher during Operation Active Fence deployment in Turkey.

The MIM-104 Patriot surface-to-air missile system combats targets in the medium to long range, up to 60 kilometers. Each system covers a sector of 120 degrees against both manned and unmanned aircraft, helicopter, ballistic and cruise missiles. The DGLC operates four Patriot batteries. Both PAC-2 and PAC-3, which is capable of intercepting ballistic missiles, missiles are in use. All Dutch systems are undergoing through modernisation since 2019.

=== AGBADS ===
The Army Ground-based Air Defence System (AGBADS) integrates the NASAMS 2 medium-range, with AMRAAM missiles, and FIM-92 Stinger short-range air defence systems. In addition, AGBADS utilises 2 types of radars. The NASAMS platoon operates the AN/MPQ-64 Sentinel radar, which is supplemented by the Telefunken Radar Mobil Luftraumüberwachung (TRML) radar system. The images of the radar systems are combined in a local air picture (LAP), which is accessible to the entire unit.

The DGLC has two NASAMS systems, a system consists of:

- 1 SAM Fire Control (SFC): the fire control centre from which the AMRAAM launchers and Sentinel radars are operated.
- 1 AN/MPQ-64M2 Sentinel-radar: provides the SFC with an accurate air picture.
- 3 NASAMS Launchers: each launcher can fire six AMRAAM (AIM-120B) missiles.

Moreover, AGBADS incorporates SHORAD provided by the FIM-92 Stinger. The DGLC operates 18 Fennek Stinger Weapon Platforms (SWP). The Fennek SWP is an armoured vehicle with a fully integrated Stinger Launching System (SLS). The SLS contains four ready-to-fire Stinger missiles that can be launched from two launchers, and can be operated from within the (relative) safety of the armoured vehicle. The SLS is built on a Pedestal Mounted Air Defence System (PMADS), produced by the Turkish company ASELSAN. Moreover, the DGLC recently reactivated a platoon operating shoulder-launched Stinger MANPADS.

=== LeFlaSys ===
The Wiesel 2 Leichtes Flugabwehrsystem (LeFlaSys, Light Air Defence System) is an air defence system mounted on the highly mobile Wiesel 2 tankette. The Ozelot variant is equipped with two ready-to-fire Stinger missiles, and is operated by Flugabwehrraketengruppe 61.

=== LÜR ===
The LÜR (Luftraumüberwachungs Radar) is a mobile radar system which provides the MANTIS and LeFlaSys systems of Flugabwehrraketengruppe 61 with a low to medium altitude air picture.

=== UDIS ===
UDIS is an experimental sensor system that is designed with the goal to detect, identify and follow drones. It consists of compact SQUIRE (Signaal Quiet Universal Intruder Recognition Equipment) man-portable ground surveillance radar, produced by Thales Nederland, and the Ranger camera system.

=== Multi Mission Radar ===
The DGLC operates three GM200 Multi Mission Radar (MMR) systems, produced by Thales Nederland. The MMR is the latest radar of the 4D ASEA family, related to the SMART-L radar in use with the Royal Netherlands Navy and various other navies. The MMR provided a detection capability for unmanned aerial systems, aircraft and missiles. The MMR is a mobile system that can be transported on the bed of a truck.

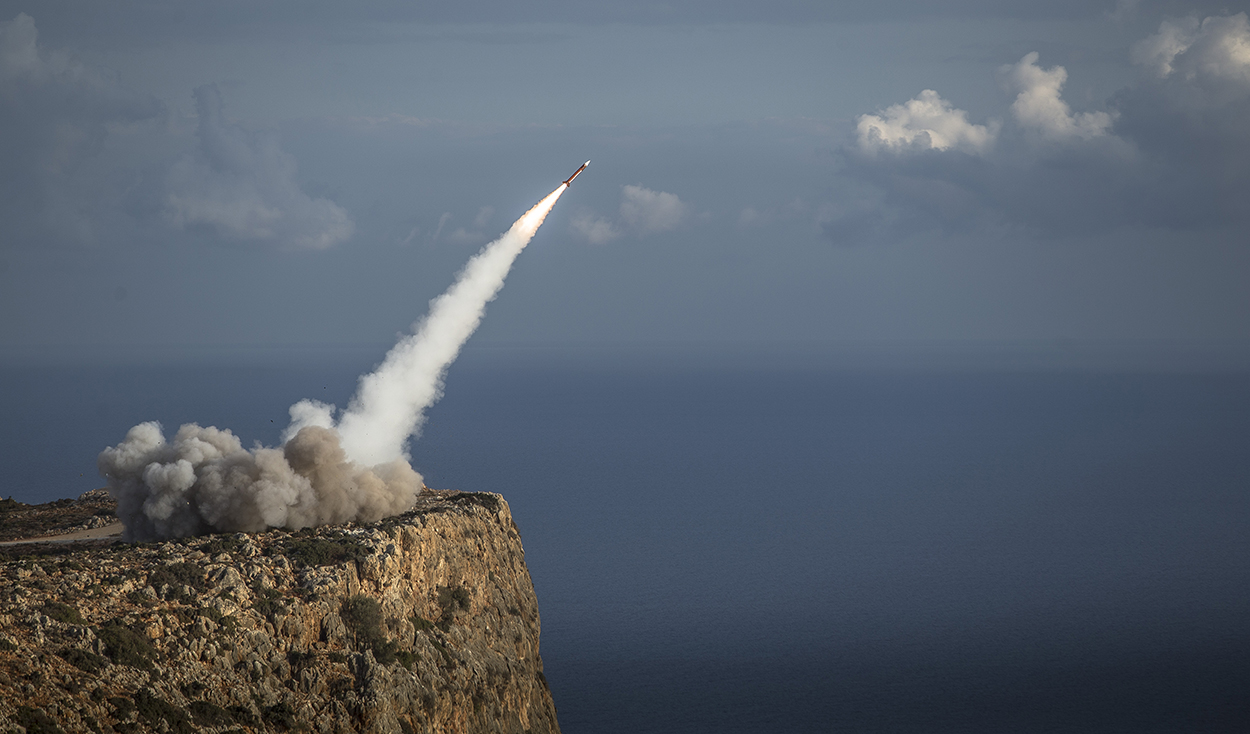
Launch of a Dutch Patriot system during a joint exercise in Chania, Greece

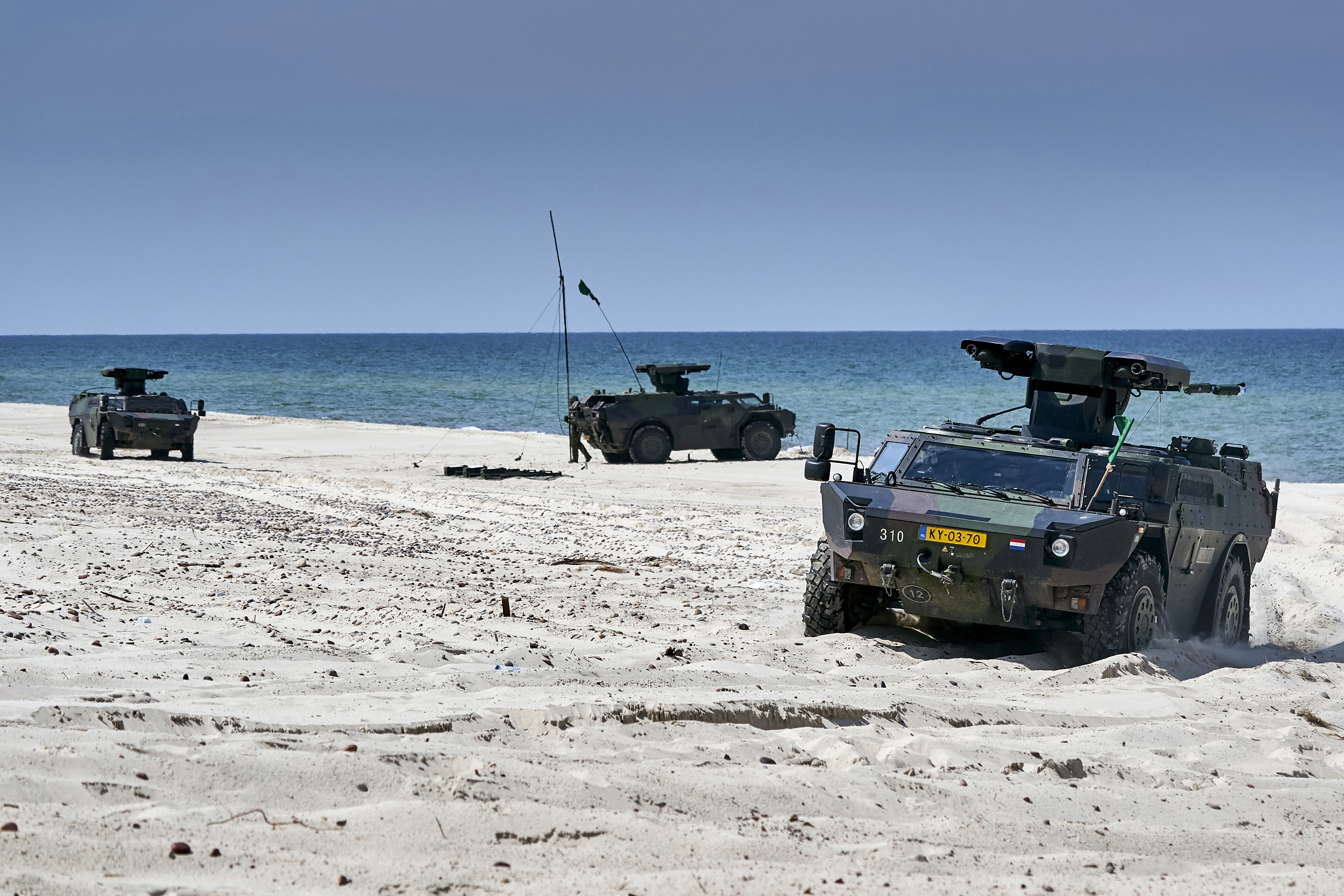
Fennek SWP during an exercise in Ustka, Poland

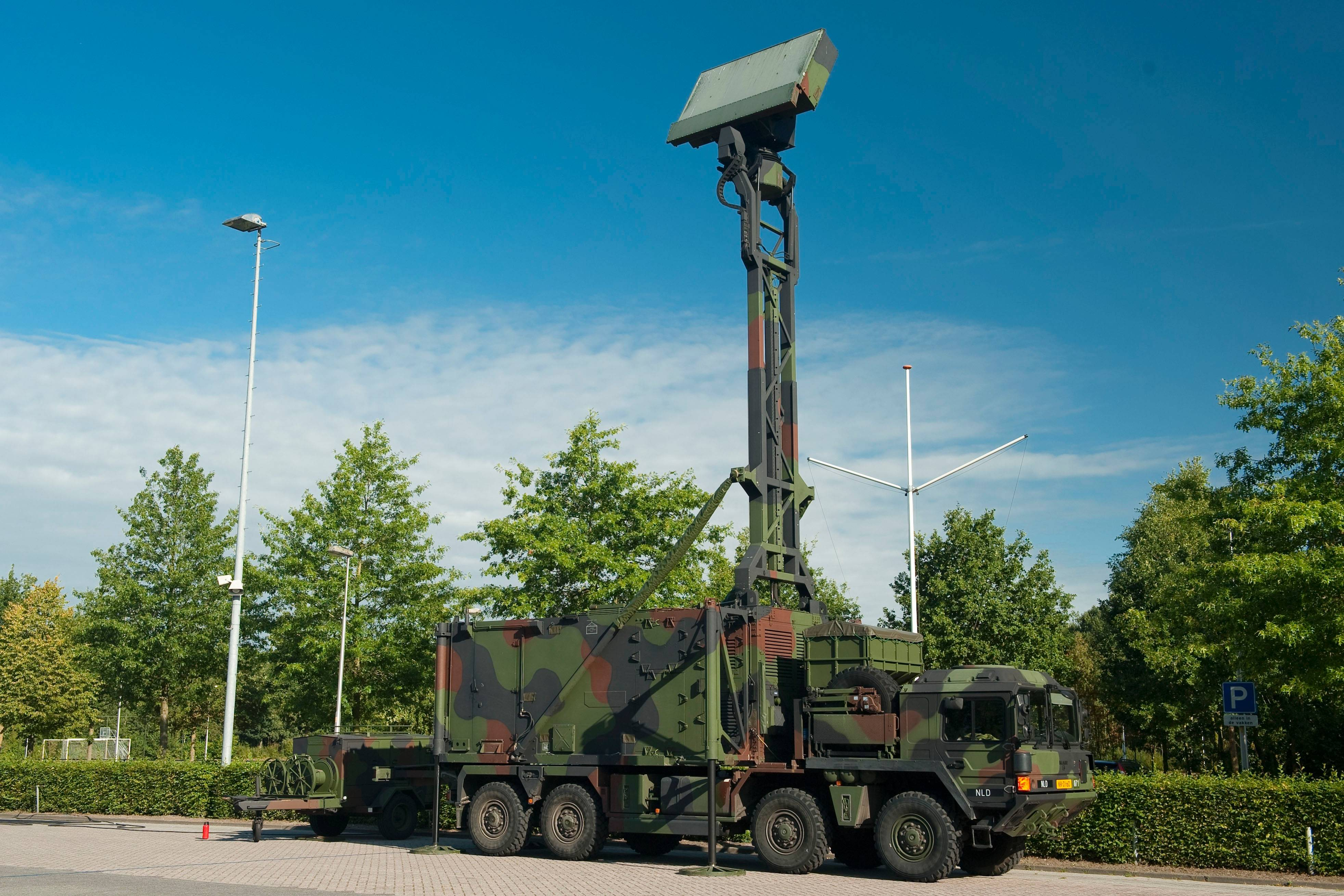
TRML radar on a MAN HX 8x8 truck

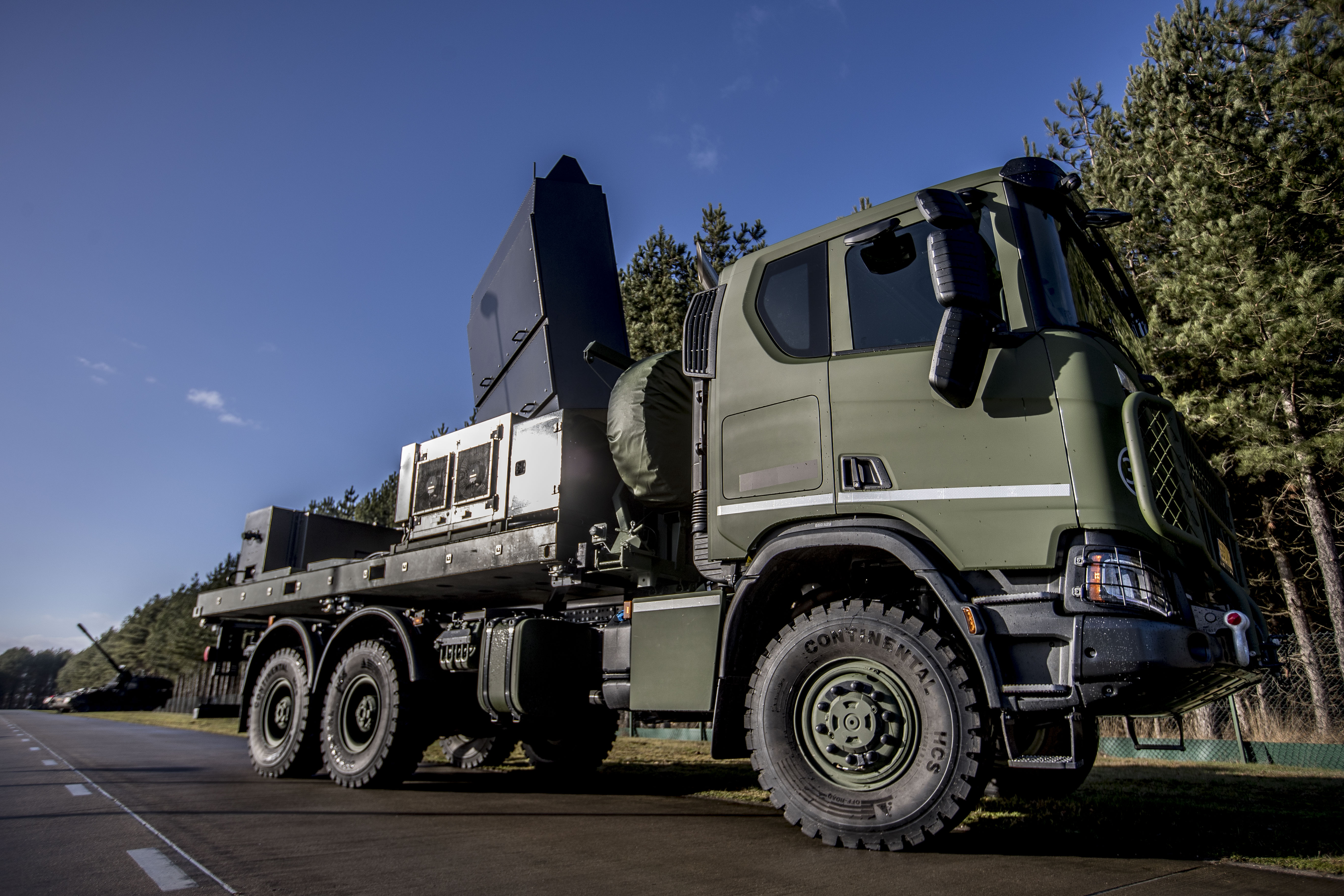
Thales Nederland MMR (Ground Master 200) radar on the bed of a Scania Gryphus 6x6 truck

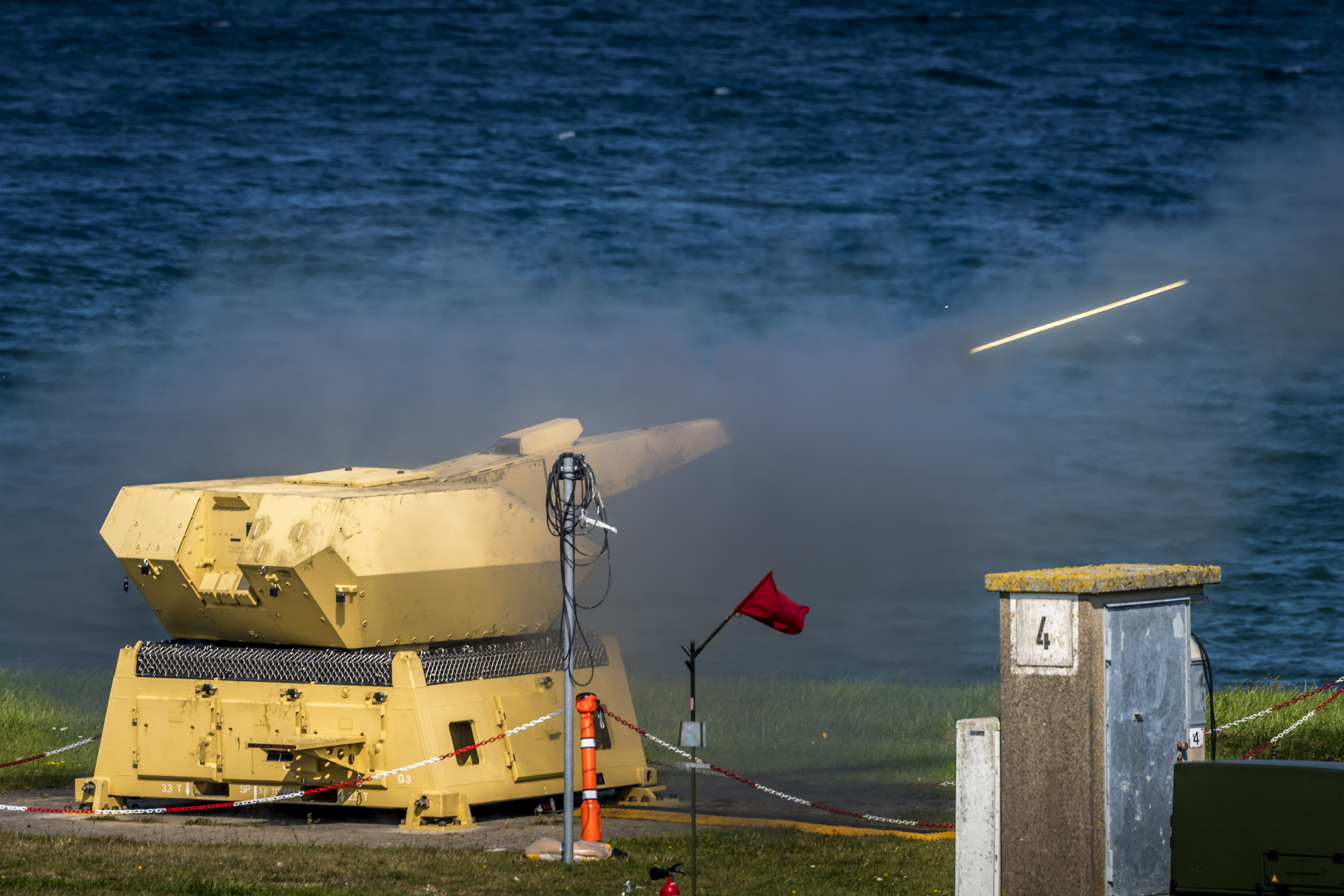
MANTIS firing during an exercise on the homebase of Flugabwehrraketengruppe 61 in Todendorf, Germany

== Deployments ==
- From 2013 to 2015, the DGLC deployed Patriot systems and personnel as part of NATO's Operation Active Fence to protect the Turkish southern border region with Syria as part of the Syrian Civil War.
- The DGLC provided layered air defence for the 2014 Nuclear Security Summit, which took place in the city of The Hague.
- Since the beginning of December 2025 the DGLC provides air defence for a logistics hub in southeast Poland that is important for military aid to Ukraine.
