= 13th Light Brigade (Netherlands) =

- 13 Lichte Brigade
- Logo of the 13th Light Brigade
- Active: 1949 – Present
- Country: Netherlands
- Branch: Royal Netherlands Army
- Type: Infantry
- Role: Light Armor
- Size: 3,000 personnel
- Part of: 10th Panzer Division (2023-Present)
- Garrison/HQ: Oirschot
- Nickname: Rhino's
- Motto: Vigilans et paratus
- Colors: Black & Yellow
- Mascot: Rhino

Commanders
- Current commander: Brigadier General G.J. (Gert-Jan) Kooij
- Notable commanders: BGen. G. (Gerard) Koot; BGen. Gijs van Keulen; BGen. M. (Michiel) van der Laan; BGen. T. (Tom) Middendorp; BGen. H. (Hans) Hardenbol

The 13th Light Brigade (Dutch: 13 Lichte Brigade) is one of the three combat brigades of the Royal Netherlands Army, the other ones being 11th Airmobile Brigade and 43rd Mechanised Brigade. The brigade is a fully motorised brigade, equipped with Fennek, Boxer and Bushmaster wheeled, armoured vehicles.

== History ==
The brigade was formed as the 13th Motorized Brigade, and came from the 3rd Infantry Brigade. The 3rd Infantry Brigade was part of the First Division "7 December", which was formed on 1 September 1946. In 1950 the brigade was transformed into a mechanized infantry brigade, the 13th Mechanized brigade, which became part of the 4th Division and was stationed in North Germany. After the reforms of 1970 the brigade became again a part of the First Division. In the early 1990s the brigade became a fully mechanized brigade. In 2013, the brigade lost its mechanized infantry fighting vehicles and was equipped with wheeled equipment and therefore renamed 13th Light Brigade.

In 2023 the brigade was integrated into the German Army's 10th Panzer Division.

In September 2024 it was reported that the 13th Light Brigade will receive Boxer RCT30 infantry fighting vehicles.

On the 19th of December 2025 the Dutch Armed Forces' press service announced that the 13th Brigade would receive an additional infantry battalion based in Budel and equipped with CV-90 infantry fighting vehicles, and that subsequently the brigade would be designated as 13th Medium Brigade

== Organization ==
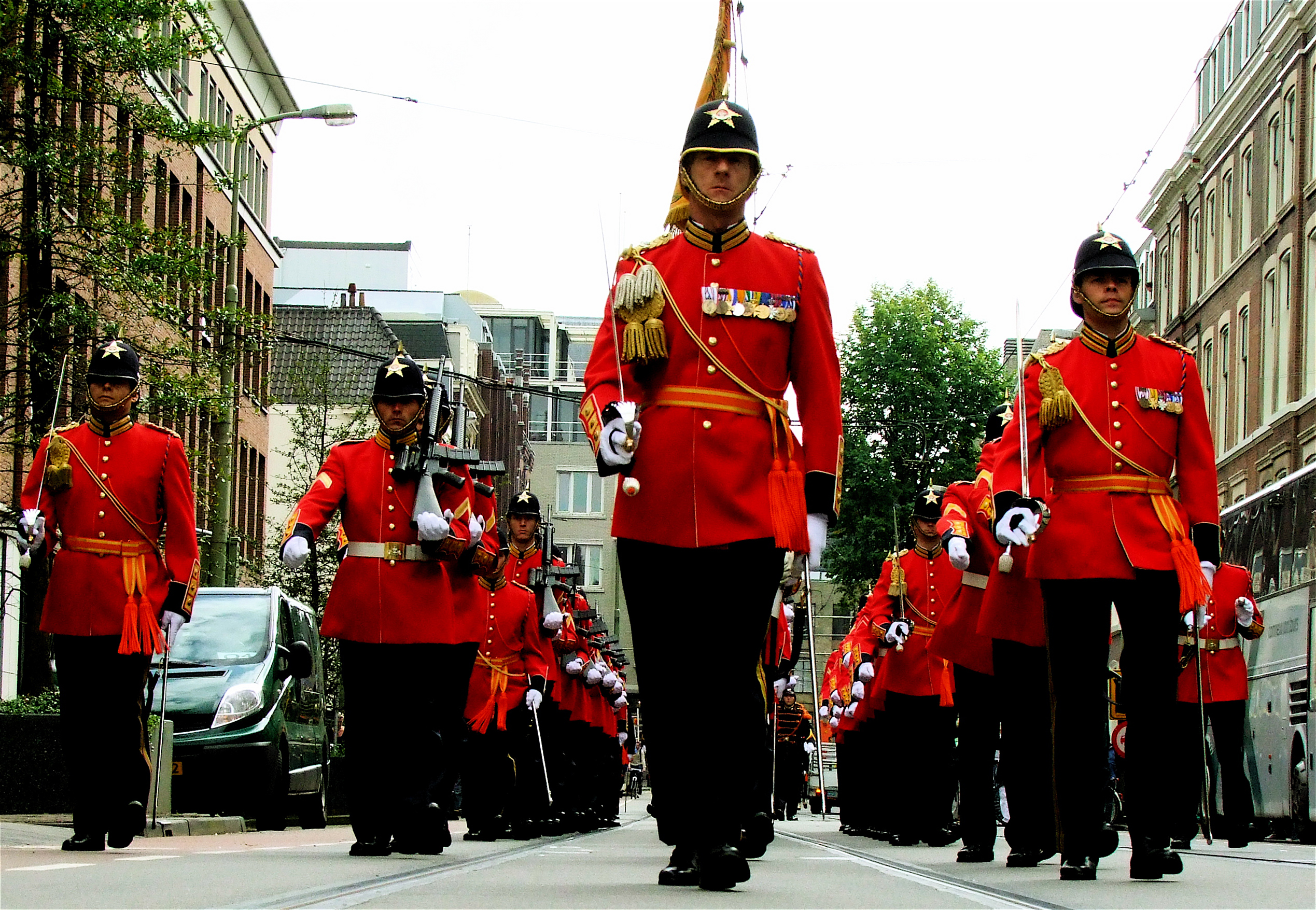
Garderegiment Fuseliers Prinses Irene in the Hague during Prinsjesdag in 2008

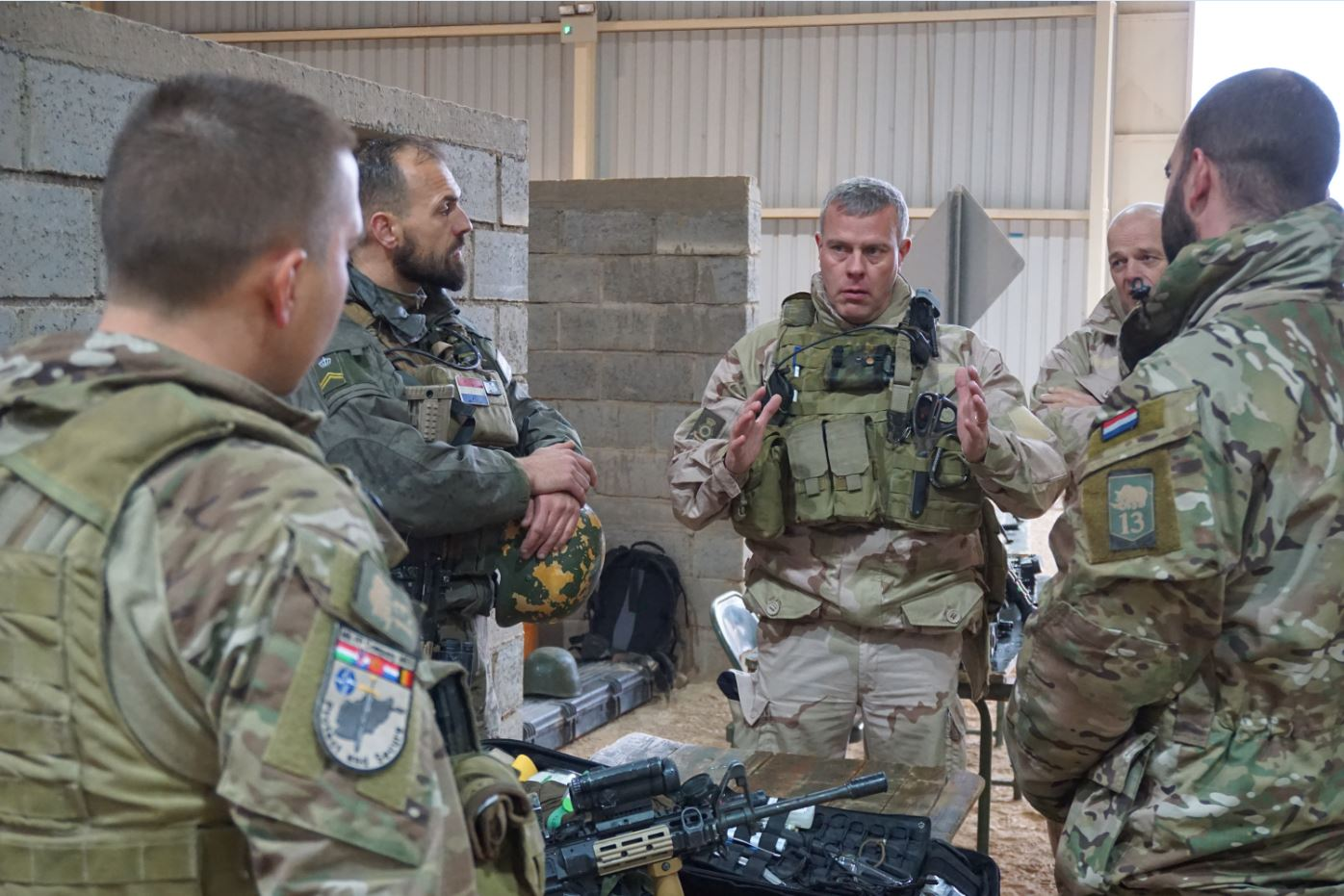
13th Light Brigade personnel in Mazar-i-Sharif, Afghanistan in 2018

As of March 2025 the 13 Light Brigade consists the following units:

- 13 Light Brigade (13 Lichte Brigade), in Oirschot
  - 13 Staff Company (13 Stafcompagnie), in Oirschot
  - 17 Armored Infantry Battalion "Garderegiment Fuseliers Prinses Irene" (17 Pantserinfanteriebataljon "Garderegiment Fuseliers Prinses Irene"), in Oirschot
    - A, B, C and D Company, with Boxer armored fighting vehicles
  - 42 Armored Infantry Battalion "Regiment Limburgse Jagers" (42 Pantserinfanteriebataljon "Regiment Limburgse Jagers"), in Oirschot
    - A, B, C and D Company, with Boxer armored fighting vehicles
  - 30 Infantry Battalion (30 Infanteriebataljon) National Reserve Corps, in Vlissingen
    - Alpha Company (Alfa-compagnie), in Vlissingen
    - Bravo Company (Bravo-compagnie), in Breda
    - Charlie Company (Charlie-compagnie), in Oirschot
    - Delta Company (Delta-compagnie), in Brunssum
    - Echo Company (Echo-compagnie), in Vredepeel
  - 41 Armored Engineer Battalion (41 Pantsergeniebataljon), in Oirschot
    - Staff Company
    - 411 and 412 Armored Engineer Company (411, 412 Pantsergeniecompagnie)
    - Multi Role Engineer Company
  - 42 Brigade Reconnaissance Squadron "Regiment Huzaren van Boreel" (42 Brigade Verkenningseskadron "Regiment Huzaren van Boreel"), in Oirschot, with Fennek reconnaissance vehicles
  - 13 Medical Company (13 Geneeskundige Compagnie), in Oirschot
  - 13 Maintenance Company (13 Herstelcompagnie), in Oirschot
  - Robotics and Autonomous Systems Cell (Robotica en Autonome Systemen cel), in Oirschot.

In the next few years, a third and fourth armoured infantry battalion will be raised, equipped with CV90 armoured infantry vehicles and Boxer armoured vehicles respectively, as well as 41 Field Artillery Battalion, equipped with PzH2000 howitzers and PULS rocket artillery, a reserve engineer company (413 Field Engineer Company (genieveldcompagnie)) and additional medical and supply elements.

== Equipment ==
- 97 Fennek armoured reconnaissance vehicles
- 117 Boxer armoured vehicle in various types.
- 30 Bushmaster infantry mobility vehicles in various types.
- 72 Mercedes-Benz G280 CDI terrain vehicles.
- 6 Milrem THeMIS unmanned ground vehicles.
