= Vredepeel =

- Village
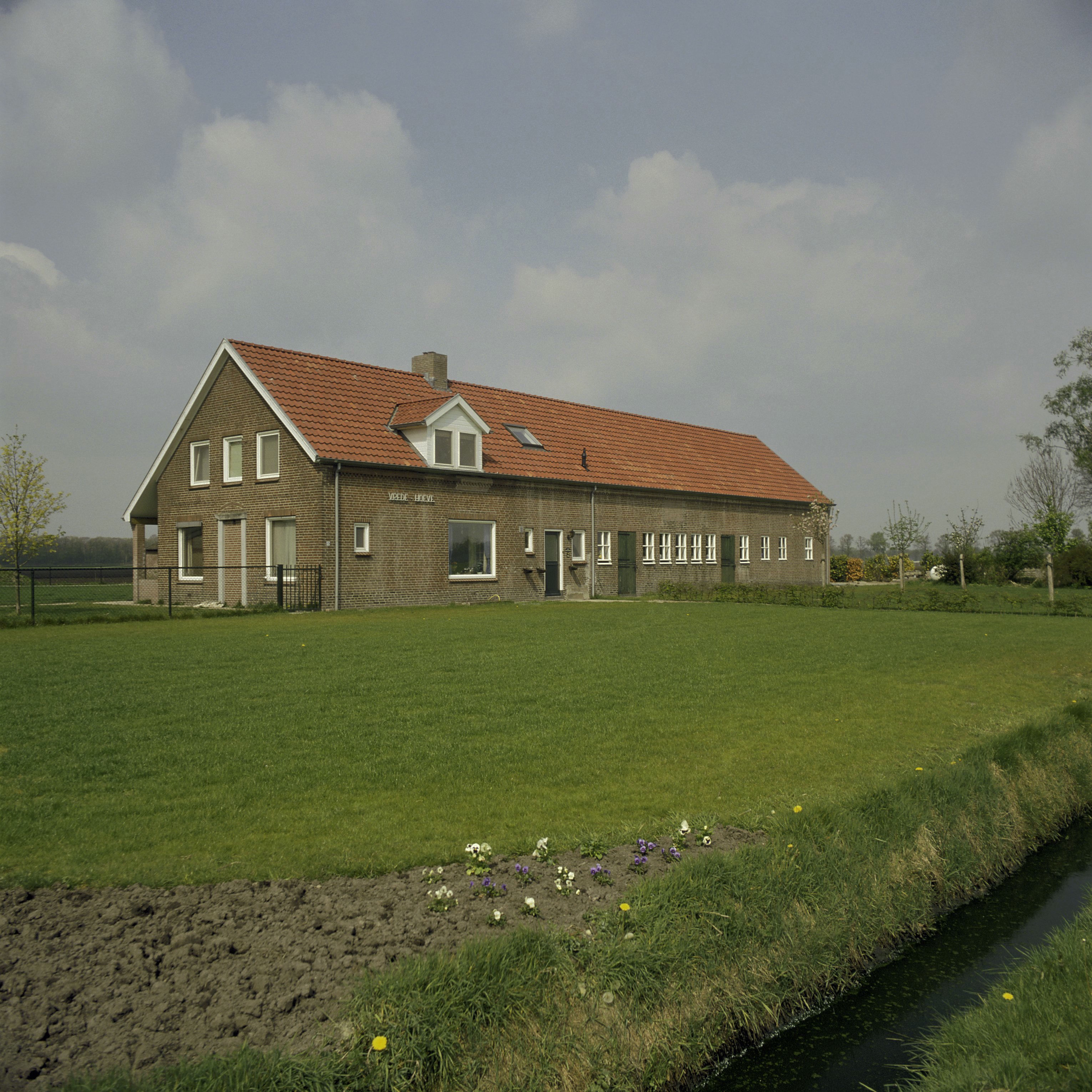
- Farm in Vredepeel

- Location in the Netherlands Location in the province of Limburg in the Netherlands
- Coordinates: 51°32′30″N 5°52′08″E
- Country: Netherlands
- Province: Limburg
- Municipality: Venray
- Established: 1955

Area
  - Total: 18.33 km^{2} (7.08 sq mi)
- Elevation: 27 m (89 ft)

Population (2021)
  - Total: 230
  - Density: 13/km^{2} (32/sq mi)
- Time zone: UTC+1 (CET)
  - Summer (DST): UTC+2 (CEST)
- Postal code: 5816
- Dialing code: 0478

Vredepeel is a village in the Dutch province of Limburg, in the municipality of Venray, with a population of 230. It is home to the Royal Netherlands Army's Joint Ground-based Air Defense Command.

The village was first mentioned in 1712 as "in de Vreeij", and refers to the peace pole. The pole was placed after the Dutch Republic and Prussia reached an agreement in 1716 about the borders in the disputed area. In 1949, the last border correction occurred in the area. The village was officially founded on 16 June 1955, and in 1957, the airport was built which is nowadays known as Lieutenant General Best Barracks.
