= Lieutenant General Best Barracks =

Lieutenant General Best Barracks Luitenant-generaal Bestkazerne
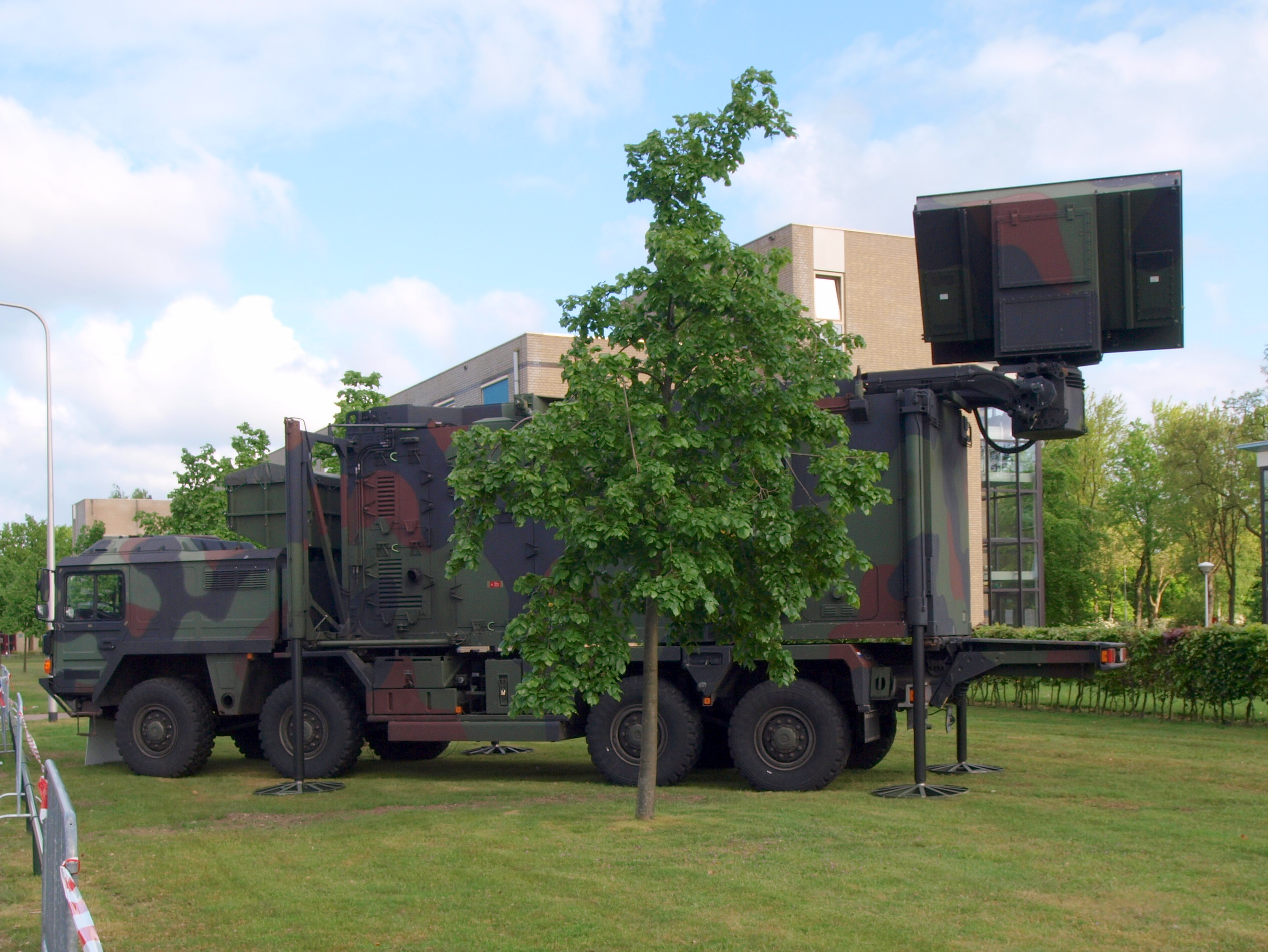
- TRML-3D/32 Surveillance and Target Acquisition Radar System
- IATA: none; ICAO: EHDP

Summary
- Airport type: Military
- Operator: Royal Netherlands Army
- Location: Venray
- Elevation AMSL: 98 ft / 30 m
- Coordinates: 51°31′34″N 005°51′34″E

Map
- Location of Lieutenant General Best Barracks

Runways
Direction	Length		Surface
Direction	ft	m	Surface
06/24	9,803	2,988	Concrete/asphalt

Lieutenant General Best Barracks (Dutch: Luitenant-generaal Bestkazerne), formerly De Peel Air Base (Dutch: Luchtmachtbasis De Peel), is a Royal Netherlands Army guided missile base in the Netherlands. It has only one, though not actively used, runway.

== History ==
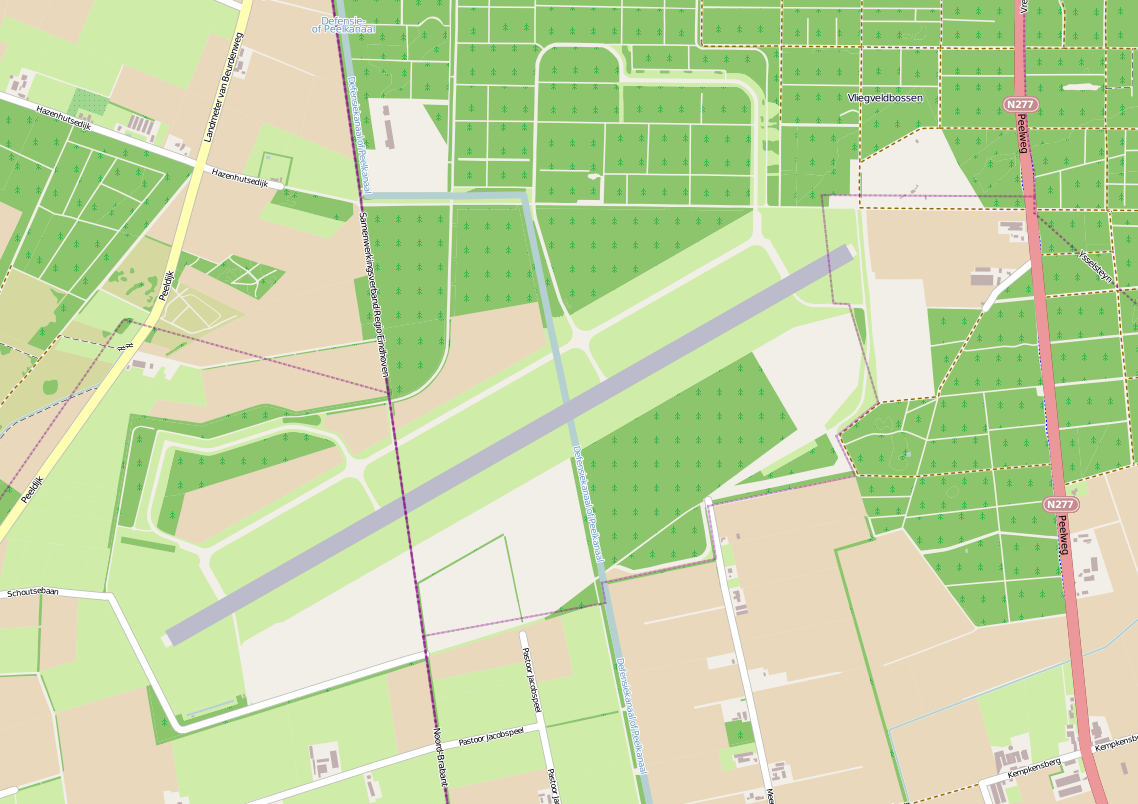
OpenStreetMap of the base

During World War II in June 1944 the German Luftwaffe constructed the first airfield near the town of De Rips, consisting of a single 1,400-meter (4,600 ft) long and 75-meter (246 ft) wide grass strip. The airfield did not see much use by the retreating German forces and was later briefly used in October 1944 by the Royal Canadian Air Force 126 wing as an Advanced Landing Ground (designated B-84). It was not located on the site of the current air base, but about 8 kilometers (5 mi) to the north-west of it. There are no visible remains of it today.

The air base was founded as a diversion airfield in 1954 with two parallel runways (06L/24R and 06R/24L) and never served as an active base for aircraft, seeing only incidental usage from the aerial photo reconnaissance unit from nearby Volkel Air Base, even though the base was expanded in 1973 for possible NATO use. In 1993 it was closed as an operational airfield and became the home base of the Royal Netherlands Air Force guided missile division (Groep Geleide Wapens, or GGW). One runway remained, though it is no longer actively used by the military. The base is used for glider flying. Military aerial exercises also take place in its airspace.

In March 2012 it was decided as part of a reorganisation to transfer control of the base from the Royal Netherlands Air Force to the Royal Netherlands Army, resulting in a name change to Lieutenant General Best Barracks (Dutch: Luitenant-generaal Bestkazerne). It is still commonly referred to as De Peel.

== Units ==
The following units are based at Vredepeel:

- Joint Ground-based Air Defense Command
  - 800 Support Squadron (800 Ondersteuningssquadron)
    - Communication and Information Systems Flight (CIS-vlucht)
    - Logistics Flight (Logistieke vlucht)
    - Force Protection Flight (Force Protection-vlucht)
  - 802 Patriot Squadron (802 Patriot-squadron)
    - Command and Control Flight(Commandovoeringsvlucht)
    - 4x Patriot flights (Patriot-vlucht), with Patriot long range surface-to-air missiles (4th flight was activated July 1st 2024)
    - Logistics Flight (Logistieke vlucht)
  - 11th Air Defense Battery (11 Luchtverdedigingsbatterij)
    - 2x Counter-UAS-platoon, with Squire
  - 12th Air Defense Battery (12 Luchtverdedigingsbatterij) (Activated July 1st 2024)
    - Being formed, will be equipped and structured identically to the 13th Air Defense Battery
  - 13th Air Defense Battery "Ypenburg" (13 Luchtverdedigingsbatterij Ypenburg)
    - 2x NASAMS Platoon (NASAMS-peloton), with NASAMS 2 medium range surface-to-air missiles and AN/MPQ-64 radar systems
    - 3x Stinger Platoon (Stinger-peloton), with Fennek-mounted FIM-92 Stinger short range surface-to-air missiles and TRML-3D/32 radar systems
    - 1x Stinger MANPAD platoon, with shoulder launched FIM-92 Stinger missile
    - Counter Rocket, Artillery, and Mortar Platoon (Counter Rockets, Artillery and Mortar-peloton)
    - Logistics Platoon (Logistiek peloton)
