= Stroe, Gelderland =

Stroe
- Village
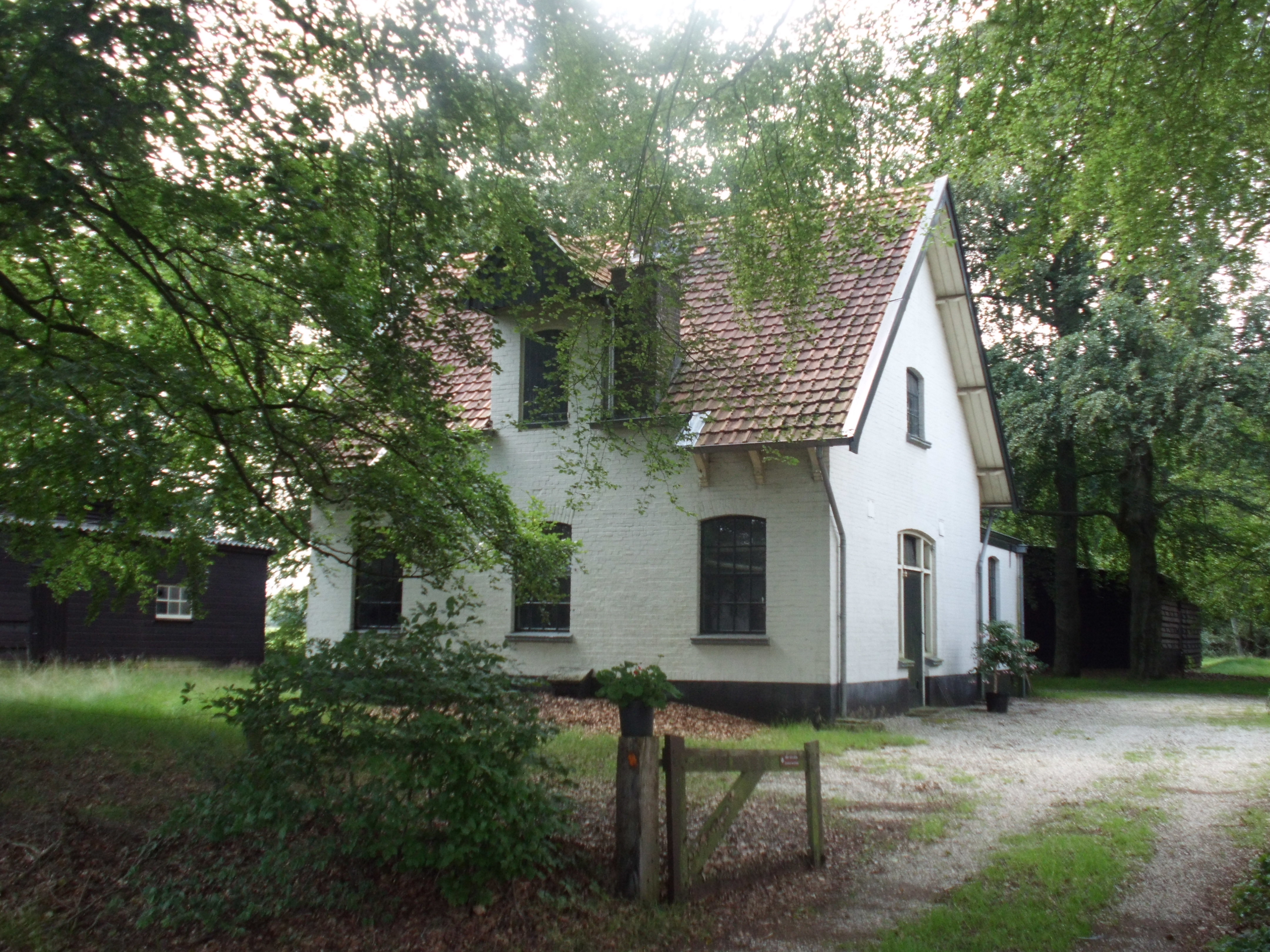
- Seed pit building

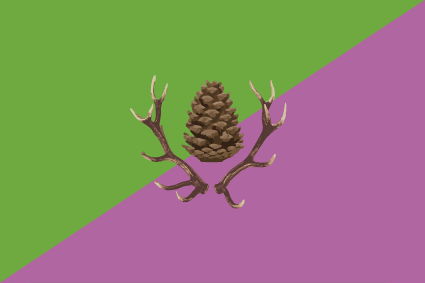
- Flag

- Location in the province of Gelderland Stroe (Netherlands)
- Coordinates: 52°11′7″N 5°41′28″E
- Country: Netherlands
- Province: Gelderland
- Municipality: Barneveld

Area
  - Total: 30.65 km^{2} (11.83 sq mi)
- Elevation: 19 m (62 ft)

Population (2021)
  - Total: 2,170
  - Density: 70.8/km^{2} (183/sq mi)
- Time zone: UTC+1 (CET)
  - Summer (DST): UTC+2 (CEST)
- Postal code: 3776
- Dialing code: 0342

Stroe is a village in the Dutch province of Gelderland. It is located in the municipality of Barneveld, between the towns of Barneveld and Apeldoorn.

Stroe is located on the railway line between these two towns, but the railway station closed in 1944.

== History ==
It was first mentioned in 1296 as "Wlfumdus de Struode", and means "swamp with overgrowth". In 1840, it was home to 122 people. In 1966, a village house was opened in Stroe. In 1951, the army base Wittenberg was constructed near Stroe. In 1978, it was renamed Major-General Koot Barracks after Henri Koot.

== Gallery ==
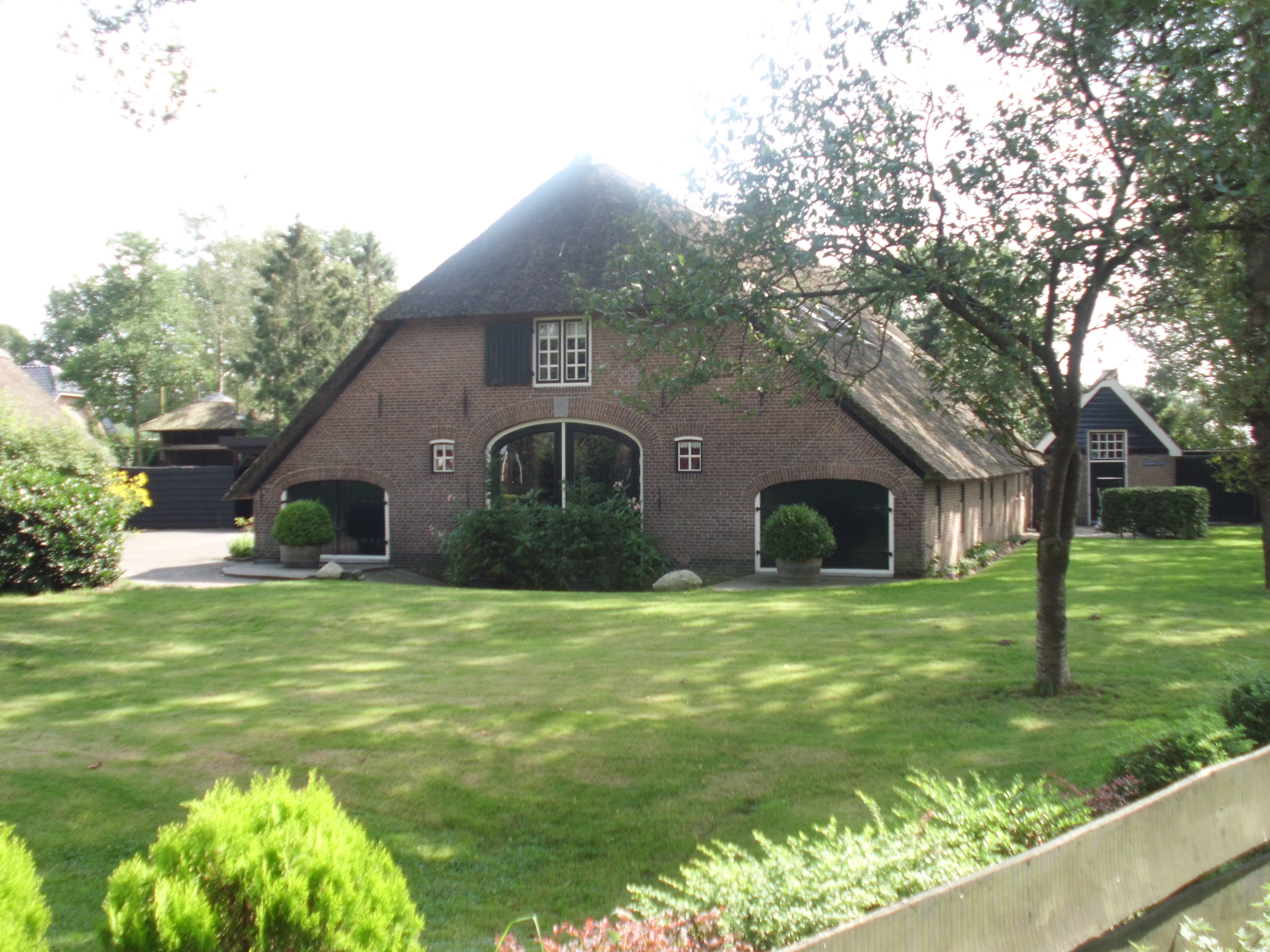
Farm in Stroe

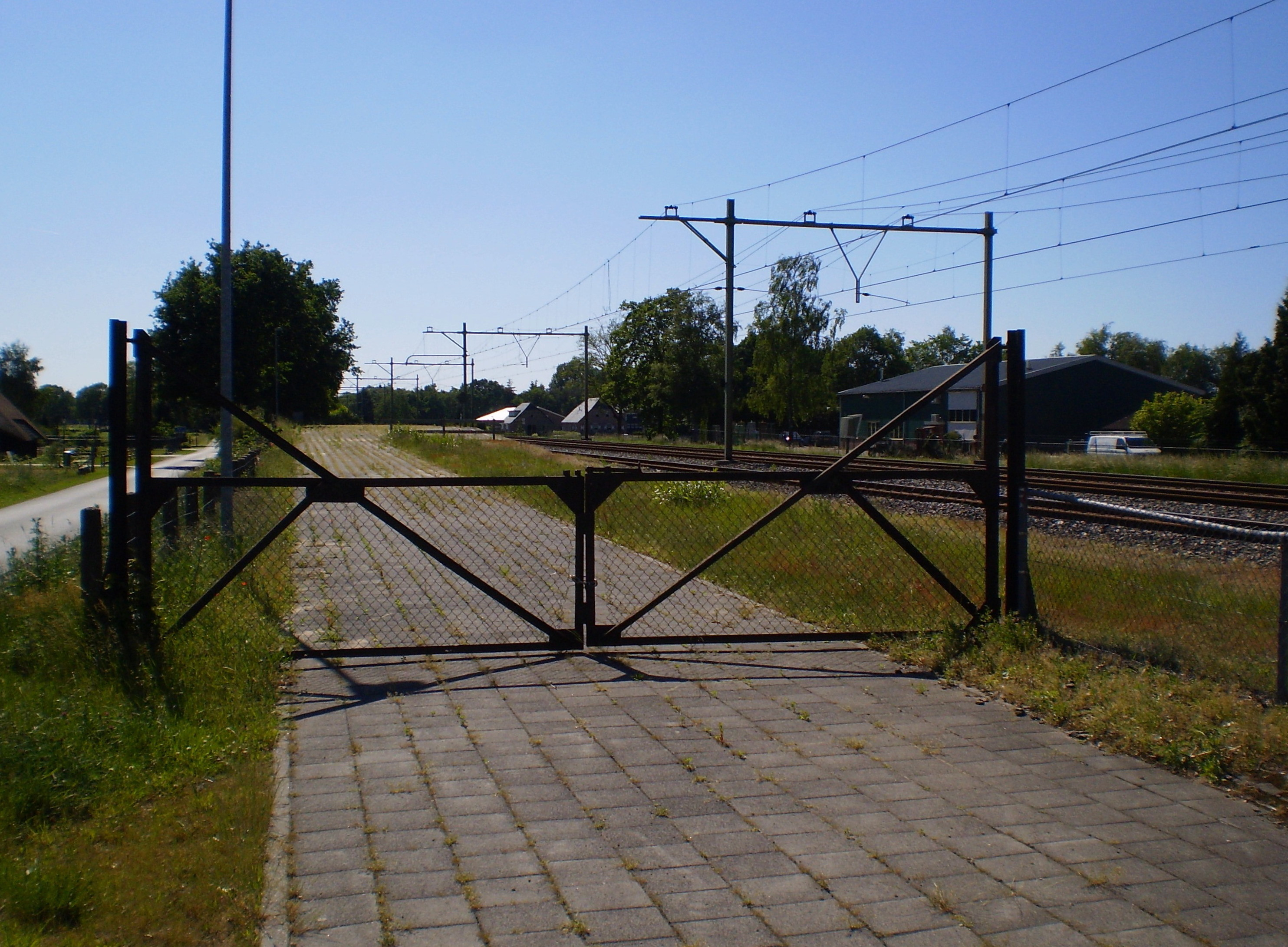
Former railway station

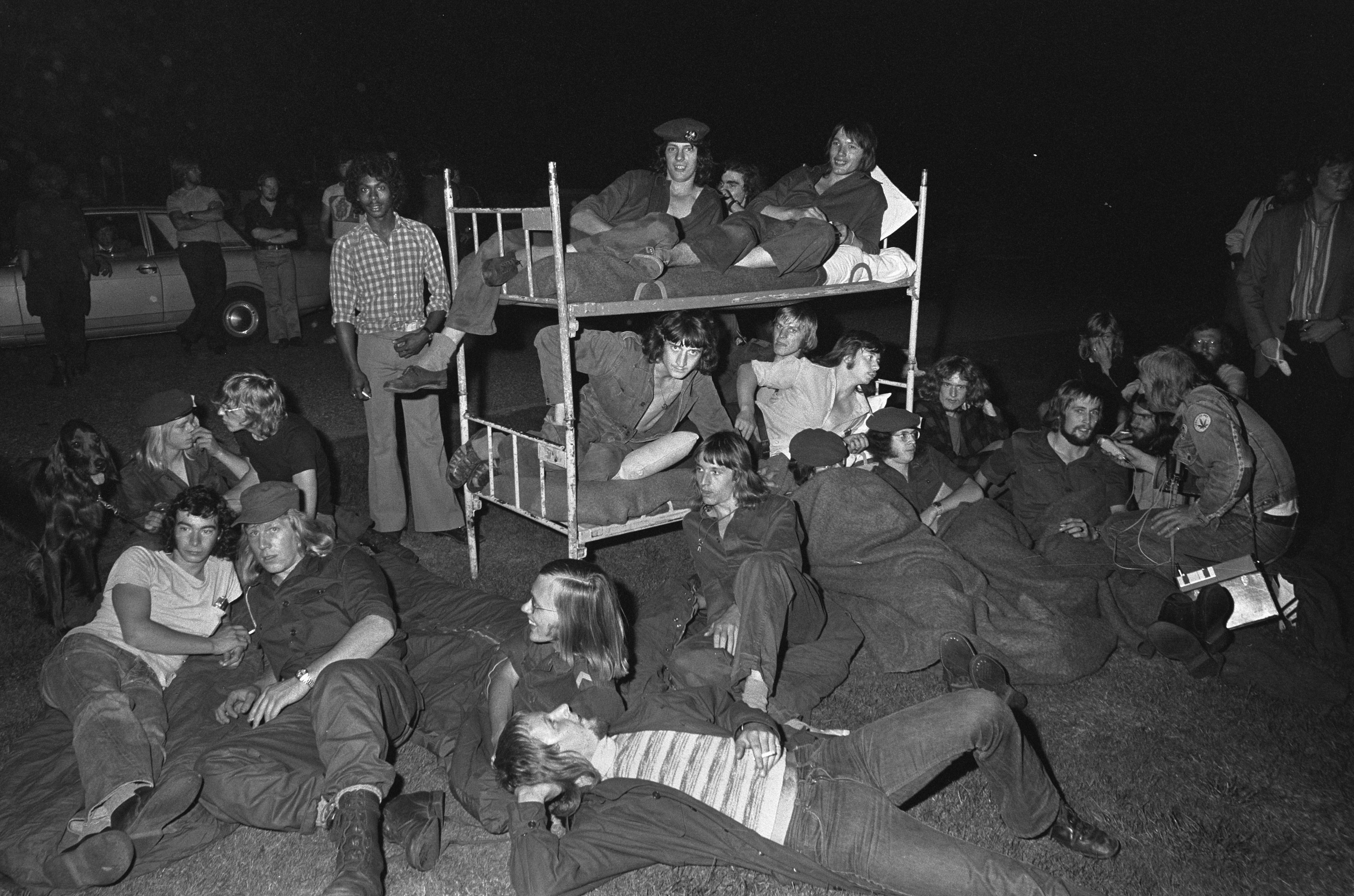
Long haired soldiers sleeping outside in protest (1973)

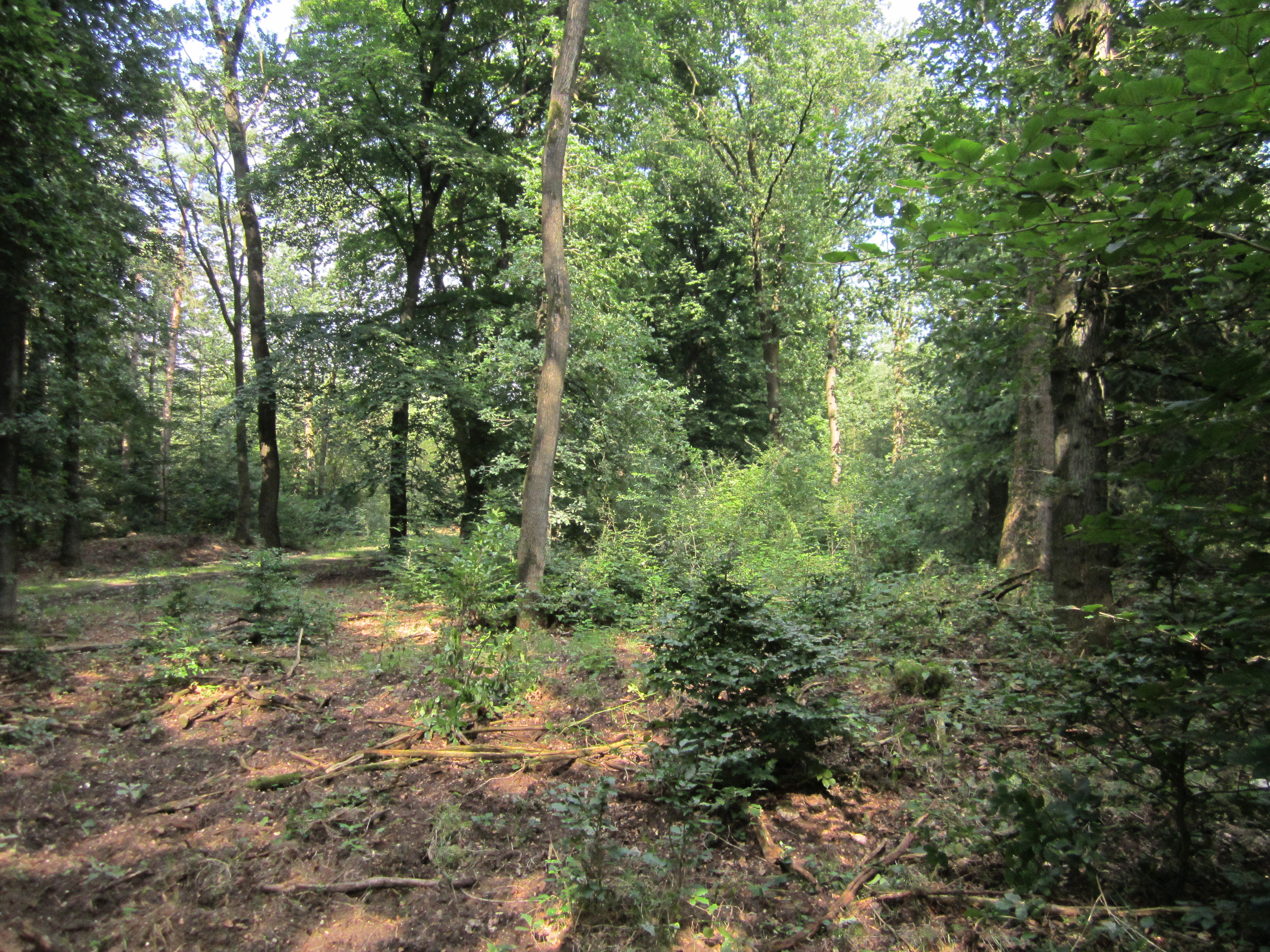
Forest near Stroe
