= AN/MPQ-64 Sentinel =

X-band PESA short-range air defense radar

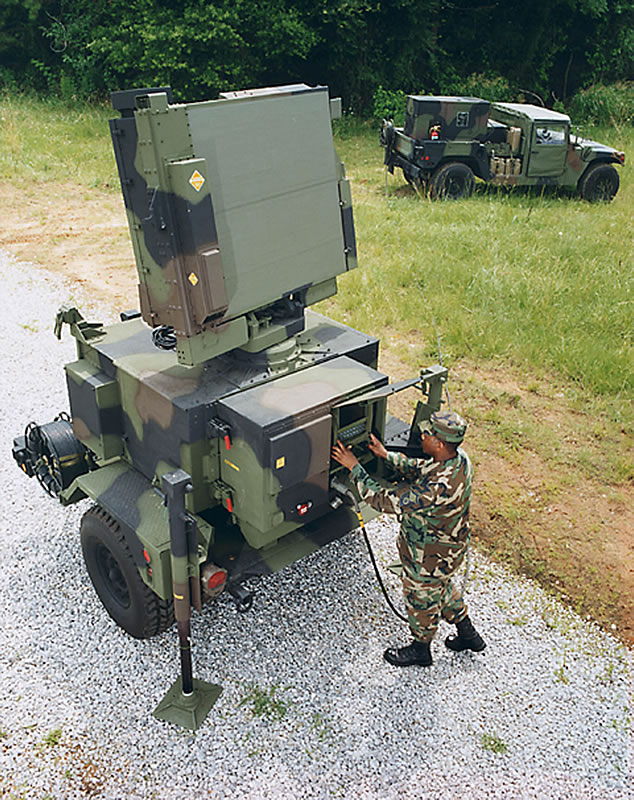
- A Sentinel radar
- Country of origin: United States
- Frequency: X band
- Range: AN/MPQ-64: 40 km (25 mi); AN/MPQ-64F1/A3: 120 km (75 mi)
- Altitude: Operating: 3,000 m (9,800 ft); Non-operating: 12,000 m (39,000 ft)
- Azimuth: 360°
- Elevation: –10° to +55°

The AN/MPQ-64 Sentinel is an X-band electronically steered pulse-Doppler 3D radar system used to alert and cue Short Range Air Defense (SHORAD) weapons to the locations of hostile targets approaching their front line forces. It is currently produced by Raytheon Missiles & Defense.

First built in 1995 as a modification of AN/TPQ-36A for search and track role in the Norwegian NASAMS air defense system, the Sentinel radar is deployed with forward area air defense units of the U.S. Army. Mounted on a towed platform, it can be positioned remotely from the rest of the unit.

In accordance with the Joint Electronics Type Designation System (JETDS), the "AN/MPQ-64" designation represents the 64th design of an Army-Navy electronic device for ground mobile radar combination equipment. The JETDS system also now is used to name all Department of Defense electronic systems.

== Main characteristics ==
The antenna uses phase-frequency electronic scanning technology, forming sharp 3D pencil beams covering large surveillance and track volume. It uses a rotating platform with a high scan rate (30 RPM) to provide 360 degree coverage. The radar is designed with high resistance to electronic countermeasures (ECM) and anti-radiation missiles (ARM).

The system automatically acquires, tracks, classifies, identifies and reports high- and low-altitude targets, including cruise missiles, unmanned aerial vehicles, and both rotary- and fixed-wing aircraft. Identification of friendly aircraft is aided by identification friend or foe (IFF) interrogation.

The system can be deployed using HMMWV fitted with a 10 kW 400 Hz 115/200 VAC on-board power generator. It can be operated autonomously and communicate with the fire direction center via wideband fiber-optic link. It can also distribute its data over a SINCGARS radio network.

== AN/MPQ-64A1 Improved Sentinel ==
Under A1 Improved Sentinel modernization program, existing Sentinel units are equipped with modern digital COTS-based electronics for signal and data processing, which ensures greater performance and allows software modification for quick updates of fielded systems.

Waveform upgrades for the receiver/exciter and the replacement of the transmitter with power amplifier modules allows Sentinel to generate, receive and filter low-intensity target classification waveforms. Variable rotation rate increases time on target and position the antenna to improve classification and tracking of smaller cruise missile targets. Updated software supports classification of beyond visual range targets and electronic countermeasures.

The upgrade provides a significant range extension and better detection against subsonic cruise missiles, slow-moving Unmanned Aerial Vehicles and drones, and rotary-wing and fixed-wing aircraft.

== AN/MPQ-64F1 ==
Updated version of Improved Sentinel for the NASAMS 2 air defense system.

== AN/MPQ-64M2 ==
Employed by the Dutch Joint Ground-based Air Defence Command.

== AN/MPQ-64A3 Enhanced Sentinel ==
The U.S. Army ordered the A3 Enhanced Sentinel improvement program in 2011.

The upgrade includes the TPX-57 Mode 5 Identification Friend or Foe (IFF) modification kit, which consists of a new Ethernet router, enhanced Radar Control Terminal (eRCT), Signal Data Processor (SDP) box, and multiple circuit card assemblies. This will convert existing A1 Improved Sentinel units to A3 Enhanced Sentinel configuration, increasing reliability and fixing identified hardware issues to match the capabilities of the F1 Improved Sentinel.

The eRCT enables remote operations and includes a tactical data recorder needed to support counter-battery radar capabilities. A new operational mode, Multi Mode Sentinel, provides detection for Rocket, Artillery, and Mortar (RAM) fire, giving rapid information on the point of origin of the hostile fire as well as an estimate of the impact point.

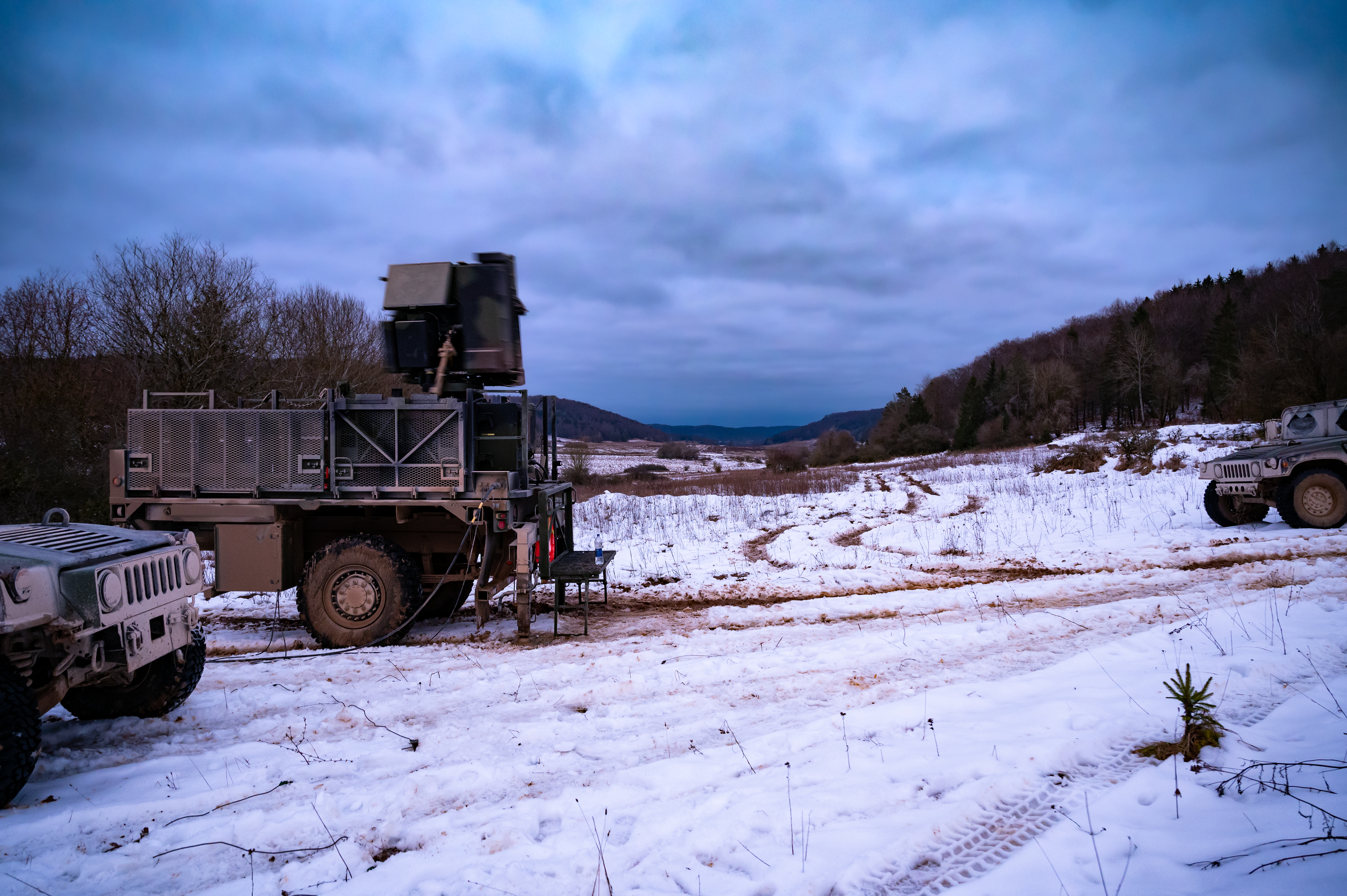
AN/MPQ-64A3

AN/MPQ-64A3 is mounted on a 2.5 ton trailer with an on-board power generator, towed by an armored Family of Medium Tactical Vehicles (FMTV) truck.

Additional updates are planned for the FY2016-2022. The Common Platform Upgrade modifies the prime mover for the rotating antenna to a common Army platform, which allows the sensor to receive commands from the Integrated Air and Missile Defense Battle Command System (IBCS) network.

The Adjunct Sensor upgrade improves countermeasure protection and threat detection by using a separate S-Band antenna. Identification Friend or Foe (IFF) upgrade adds Mode S support with GPS M-Code capability.

On 25 March 2026 this radar along with a blackhawk was struck at the Victory Base Complex in bahgdad by an IRI fibre optic drone as part of the Iran war.

== AN/MPQ-64A4 ==
In 2019, the U.S. Army selected Lockheed Martin to develop the active electronically scanned array (AESA) variant of the radar in a $281 million contract. The Sentinel A4 is a complete redesign of the sensor that uses digital processing and solid-state antenna modules based on gallium nitride (GAN) transmitters. The scalable modular architecture is shared with the long-range AN/TPY-4 radar, which has 1000 individually controlled elements and uses GPU computing for signal processing.

The AESA antenna allows extended range, faster and more accurate hostile target recognition, and ability to track more threats. It will detect and track small targets, such as Unmanned Aircraft Systems (UAS) and Cruise Missiles, and slow targets, such as UAS and Rotary Wing (RW) aircraft, at low altitudes in clutter and urban settings, with high levels of unwanted signals and echoes generated from physical objects in the environment.

Sentinel A4 will be able to contribute sensor data to the Integrated Air and Missile Defense Battle Command System (IBCS) network and Indirect Fire Protection Capability Increment 2.

== Manufacturer ==
Produced by Raytheon Missiles & Defense. Before its acquisition by the Raytheon Company, the Hughes Aircraft Co. developed the AN/MPQ-64 Sentinel radar at its plant in Fullerton, California, and manufactured it at its facility in Forest, Mississippi.

== See also ==
- NASAMS
- AN/TPQ-36
- AN/TPQ-37
- List of radars
- List of military electronics of the United States
