= Todendorf =

Municipality in Stormarn, Schleswig-Holstein, Germany

- Municipality
- Coat of arms

- Location of Todendorf within Stormarn district
- Interactive map of Todendorf
- Location within Germany Location within Schleswig-Holstein
- Coordinates: 53°41′41″N 10°20′55″E
- Country: Germany
- State: Schleswig-Holstein
- District: Stormarn
- Municipal assoc.: Bargteheide-Land

Government
  - Mayor: Hans-Joachim Dwenger

Area
  - Total: 12.81 km^{2} (4.95 sq mi)
- Elevation: 49 m (161 ft)

Population (2025-12-31)
  - Total: 1,250
  - Density: 97.6/km^{2} (253/sq mi)
- Time zone: UTC+01:00 (CET)
  - Summer (DST): UTC+02:00 (CEST)
- Postal codes: 22965
- Dialling codes: 04534
- Vehicle registration: OD
- Website: www.todendorf-sh.de

Todendorf is a municipality of the district of Stormarn, located in Schleswig-Holstein, Germany.
