= KNDS Fennek =

German scout car

LGS Fennek
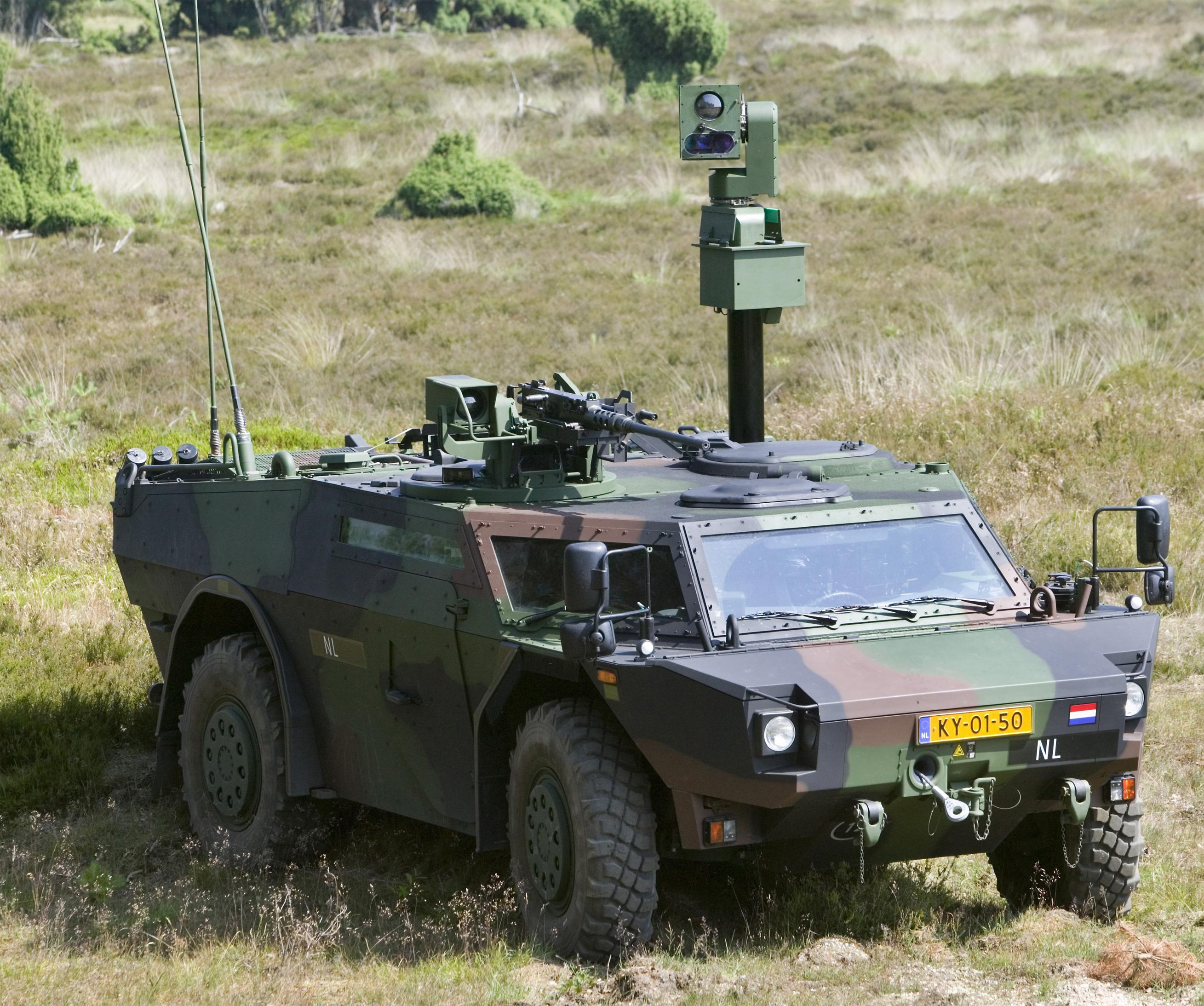
- Royal Netherlands Army Fennek
- Type: Scout car
- Place of origin: Germany / Netherlands

Service history
- In service: 2003–present
- Used by: See Operators
- Wars: War in Afghanistan; Russo-Ukrainian War; Russian invasion of Ukraine

Production history
- Designer: KNDS Deutschland; Dutch Defence Vehicle Systems
- Designed: 1997–2000
- Manufacturer: Krauss-Maffei Wegmann; Dutch Defence Vehicle Systems
- Unit cost: €1.6 million
- Produced: 2001–present
- No. built: 632

Specifications
- Mass: 9.7–10.4 tonnes (10.7–11.5 short tons)
- Length: 5.58 metres (18.3 ft)
- Width: 2.55 metres (8.4 ft)
- Height: 2.29 metres (7.5 ft)
- Crew: 3
- Main armament: HK GMG 40 mm grenade autocannon or Rheinmetall MG3 (German version), M2HB 12.7 mm machine gun (Dutch versions)
- Secondary armament: 2x3 smoke grenade launcher
- Engine: Deutz diesel 179 kW (239 hp)
- Power/weight: 18.5 kW/tonne
- Suspension: Selectable 4 wheel drive
- Operational range: 860 kilometres (530 miles)
- Maximum speed: 115 kilometres per hour (71 mph)

The Fennek, named after the fennec (a species of small desert fox), or LGS Fennek, with LGS being short for Leichter Gepanzerter Spähwagen in German (Light Armoured Reconnaissance Vehicle), is a four-wheeled armed reconnaissance vehicle produced by the German company KNDS Deutschland (formerly Krauss-Maffei Wegmann) and Dutch Defence Vehicle Systems. The Turkish company FNSS Defence Systems acquired the right for licence production in 2004. It was developed for both the German Army and Royal Netherlands Army to replace their current vehicles.

== History ==
In April 2000, the prototype vehicle finished field trials and in December 2001 a combined order was placed. The Royal Netherlands Army ordered 410 (202 reconnaissance, 130 MRAT (medium range antitank) and 78 general purpose versions) and the German Bundeswehr ordered 222 (178 reconnaissance, 24 combat engineer and 20 joint fire support teams (JFST)). More Fenneks for the German Army will be procured from 2015 on. Germany plans an overall purchase of approximately 300 Fenneks. The first vehicle was delivered to the Netherlands in July 2003 and the first to Germany in December of the same year. Deliveries will continue until 2011 (additional orders for the German Army are planned from 2015 on).

The Dutch SP Aerospace company, which produced the Fennek for the Dutch military, was declared bankrupt in August 2004. A new company called Dutch Defence Vehicle Systems (DDVS) was created to continue the production of the vehicles for the Royal Netherlands Army.

== Specifications ==
The Fennek has four wheels with selectable two or four wheel drive. It has a Deutz diesel engine producing 179 kW, giving it a top speed of 115 km/h (when the speedlimiter is turned off). Tire pressure can be regulated by the driver from inside the vehicle to suit terrain conditions.

The primary mission equipment is an observation package mounted on an extendable mast. Sensors include a thermal imager, daylight camera and a laser rangefinder. Combined with the vehicle's GPS and inertial navigation system the operator can accurately mark targets or points of interest and pass that data to the digital battlefield network. The sensor head of the observation package can also be removed and mounted on a tripod for concealed operation, as can the control unit from the vehicle should the crew want to use the entire system dismounted. Many Fenneks of the German Army are also equipped with Aladin miniature UAVs.

Various weapons can be fitted, such as a 12.7 mm machine gun for the Dutch reconnaissance version, a Rafael Spike anti-tank missile on the Dutch MRAT version or a 40 mm automatic grenade launcher (HK GMG) or Rheinmetall MG3 for the German vehicles. The Royal Netherlands Army also placed an order at the Turkish company ASELSAN for 18 Raytheon Stinger surface-to-air missile launchers to be fitted on the Fennek. The launcher in this case is the Stinger Weapon Platform (SWP), with four Stinger missiles intended for mid-range air defence. The launcher can be controlled from on board the vehicle, or else remotely as part of a distributed air defense system. On the Dutch Fennek the primary weapon is the 12.7 mm machine gun.

The vehicle is protected all-round against 7.62 mm rounds and additional armour can be added if the mission requires. The air conditioning system provides protection against nuclear, biological and chemical warfare and the crew compartment is protected against anti-personnel mines.

== Variants ==
=== German Army ===
==== Variants ====
- LVB (light reconnaissance and exploration, same as the one used by the Netherlands)
  This variant has a The BAA surveillance module which is installed on a mast raising up to 1.5 m high. The BAA module has a laser range finder, a digital camera and a thermal imager. The mast can also be mounted on a tripod, and operated from a distance (40 m). The LVB is the main variant in service, it entered in service with the A1 standard, and evolved to the A2.
  - LVB variant in standard "Fennek 1A1" equipped with RCWS KMW 1530
  - LVB variant in standard "Fennek 1A2" equipped with RCWS FLW 200, ied jamming equipment CG-20, front protection and IR headlights
- JFST (Joint Fire Support Team, some with and without IED added protection)
  Sub variants:
  - TACP (Tactical Air Control Party)
    Standard "Fennek 1A3"
    This variant is equipped with advanced communication equipment for air support to ground forces. It also has an information system with special software for requesting fire support. It is equipped with the BAA II surveillance module.
  - Forward observer
    Standard "Fennek 1A4"
    It is equipped with the improved observation and reconnaissance equipment (BAA II), the army command and information system "FüInfoSysH", the artillery command system ADLER III, and extensive radio equipment
- Fü-/ErkdFzg Pi (Command and reconnaissance vehicle Pioneer)
  - Pioneer variant in standard "Fennek 1A1" not equipped with BAA module
  - Pioneer variant in standard "Fennek 1A2" equipped with BAA module, RCWS FLW 200, ied jamming equipment CG-20, front protection and IR headlights

=== Royal Netherlands Army ===
Variants of the Fennek in the Royal Netherlands Army:

- AD (base variant)
  Some are, other aren't equipped with some IED added protection. The sub-variants are:
  - General Service
    This variant can receive High Frequency radio equipment as it often transports command personnel.
  - 81 mm Mortar transporter (L16A2 to be replaced with the Hirtenberger M8 mortars)
    The mortar is transported on the roof, and needs to be assembled to fire.
  - VCP (Forward Command Post)
- MRAT / LRAT (Medium / Long Range Anti-Tank)
  At the moment, it is a Medium range variant. It carries a tripod for anti-tank missiles. The variant of the missile use is the Spike MR. The Army intends to purchase long range variants of the missile, thus becoming a LRAT.
- LVB (light reconnaissance and exploration)
  This variant has a The BAA surveillance module which is installed on a mast raising up to 1.5 m high. The BAA module has a laser range finder, a digital camera and a thermal imager. The mast can also be mounted on a tripod, and operated from a distance (40 m). The LVB is the main variant in service
- JFST (Joint Fire Support Team, some with and without IED added protection)
  - Forward observer
    It is equipped with the BAA surveillance module.
  - TACP (Tactical Air Control Party)
    This variant is equipped with advanced communication equipment for air support to ground forces. It also has an information system with special software for requesting fire support. It is equipped with the BAA surveillance module.
- SWP (Stinger Weapon Platform)
- Training variants
  - DTV (Driver Training Vehicle)
  - OLM (used for education of technical support teams)

=== Qatar ===
JFST (Joint Fire Support Team, some with and without IED added protection)

- FAO (Forward artillery observer)

== Operational history ==
Both Germany and the Netherlands have deployed Fennek reconnaissance vehicles to Afghanistan in support of ISAF. On 3 November 2007, a Dutch Fennek was hit by an improvised explosive device killing one and wounding two other occupants. The vehicle and its crew were taking part in an offensive operation targeting the Taliban in the province of Uruzgan, Afghanistan. In another incident a German Fennek was hit by a rocket-propelled grenade. Its hollow charge jet penetrated the vehicle through the right front wheel rim, passed through the vehicle and blew the left door off the hinge. Thanks to the spall liner the crew sustained only negligible injuries.

Ukraine received an unknown number of Fenneks as part of Aid during the Russo-Ukrainian war. It lost its first Fennek in January 2025 at the Kursk campaign, as a Russian FPV suicide drone destroyed an abandoned Fennek.

== Operators ==
- (Germany) German Army
  - 252 ordered
    - 202 in December 2001
    - 10 in November 2007
    - 10 in August 2009
    - 30 second hand Dutch Fennek LVB purchased and to be upgraded to JFST by 2022
  - 217 in service in January 2016 with the intention to increase to 248 eventually.
  - 247 in service in 2022
- (Netherlands) Royal Netherlands Army
  - 410 ordered in December 2001 (€869 million) 30 sold to the German Army in 2017
  - In service
    - 367 as of 2020
    - 345 planned after MLU (2022–2028)
- (Qatar) Qatari Emiri Land Force
  - 32 ordered in 2014
  - 32 delivered from 2017 to 2020
- (Ukraine) Ukrainian Armed Forces
  - Unknown quantity received from the Netherlands (17 estimated)
    - Undisclosed number delivered in 2022
    - 9 delivered in 2023

== Gallery ==
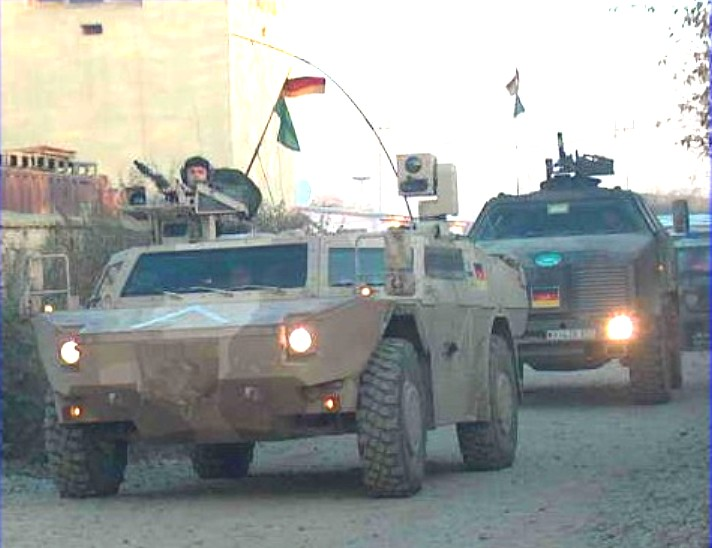
A Fennek and an ATF Dingo of the German Army in Afghanistan

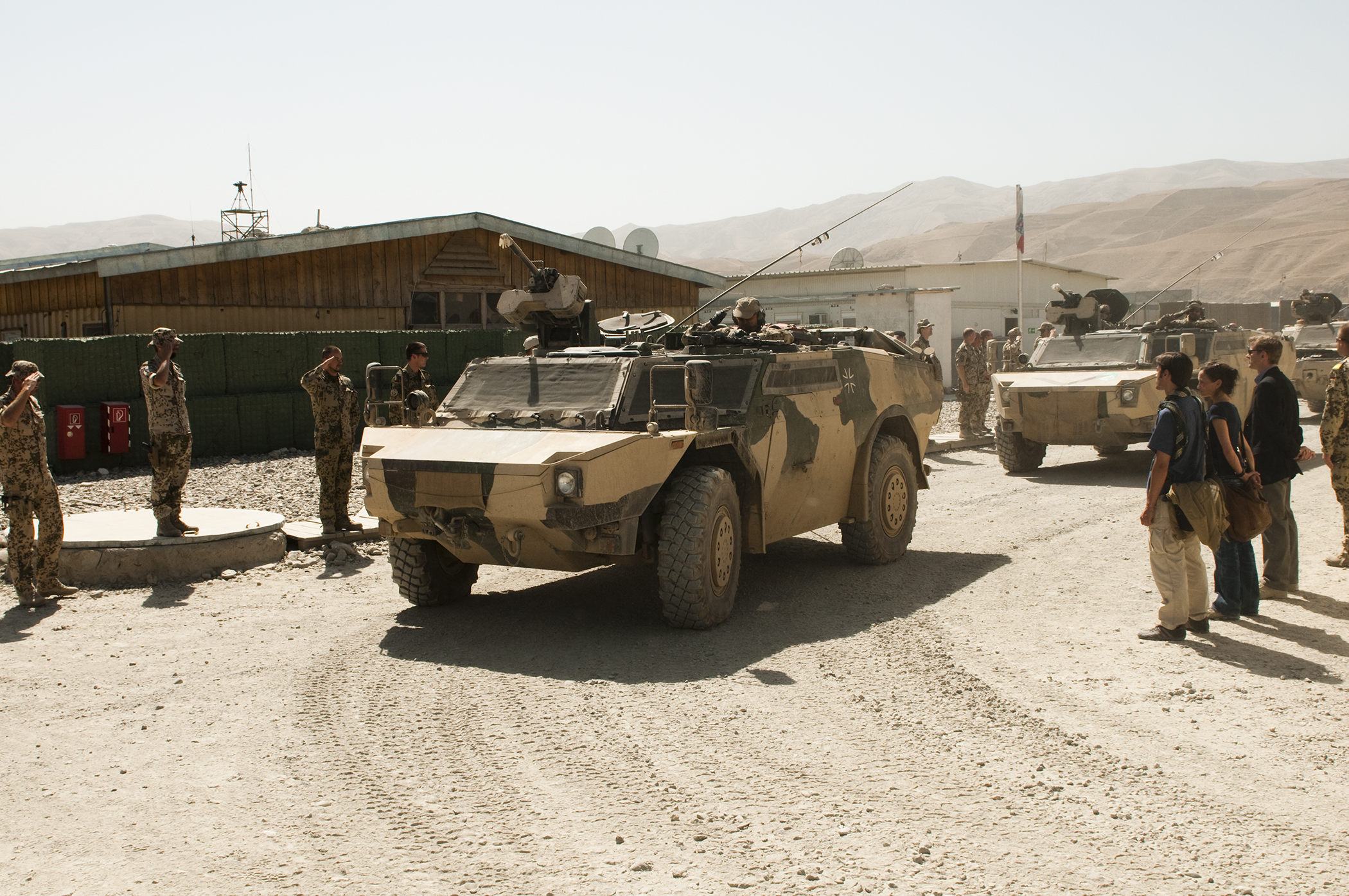
German Fenneks in Afghanistan (2009)

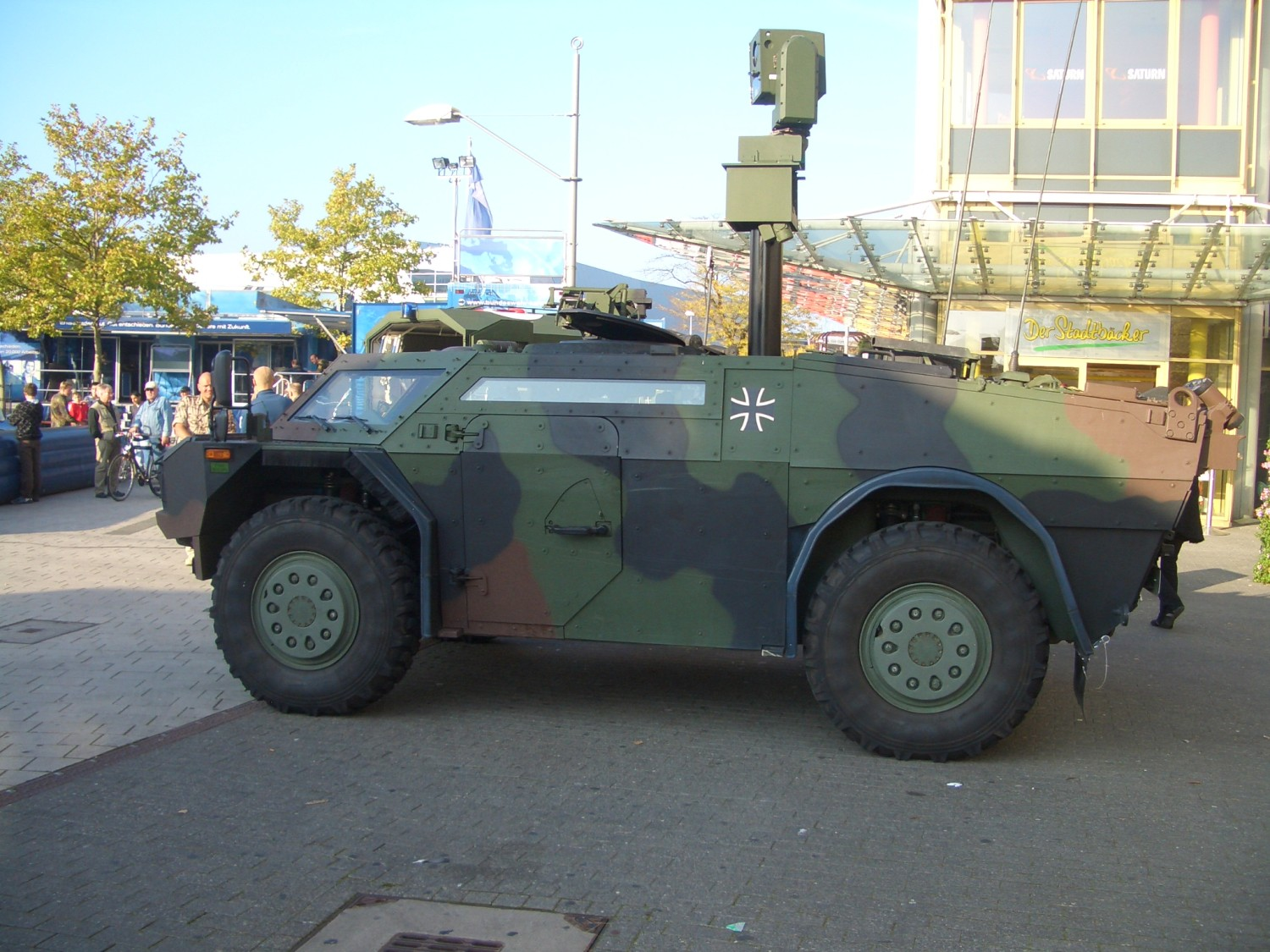
Side-view of a German Fennek

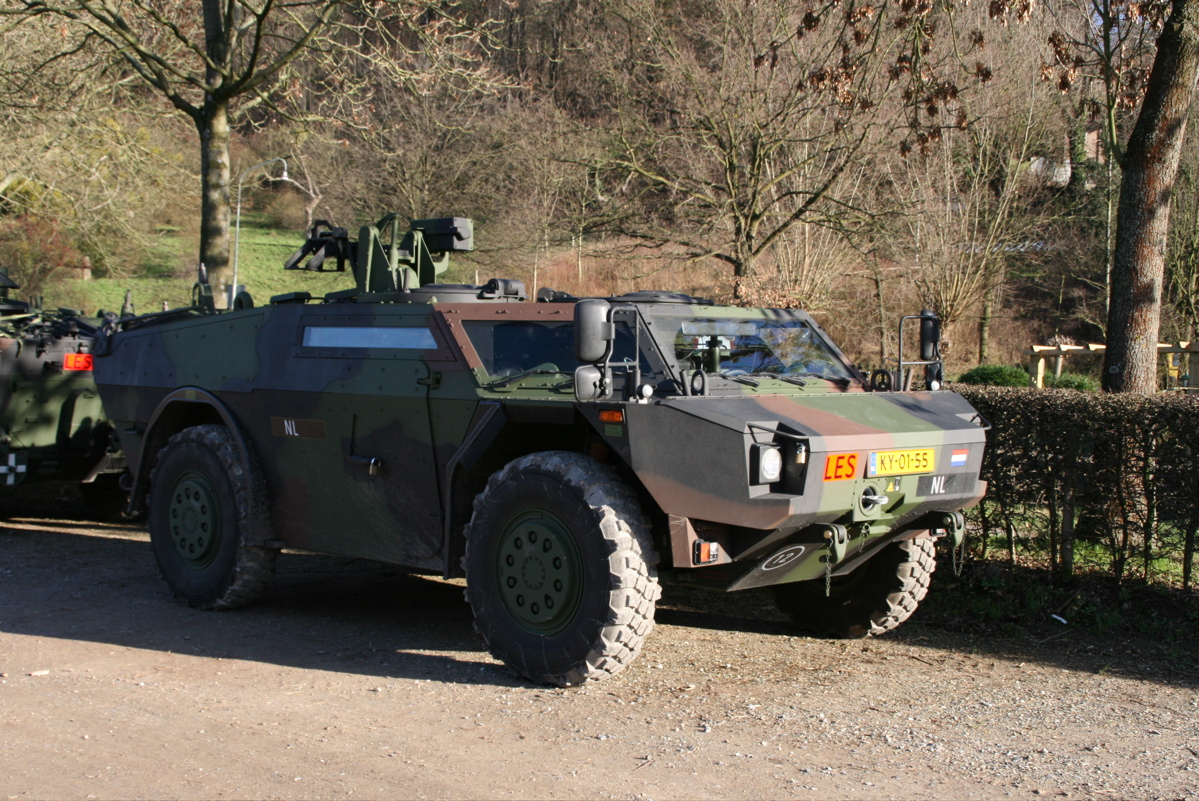
Royal Netherlands Army Fennek

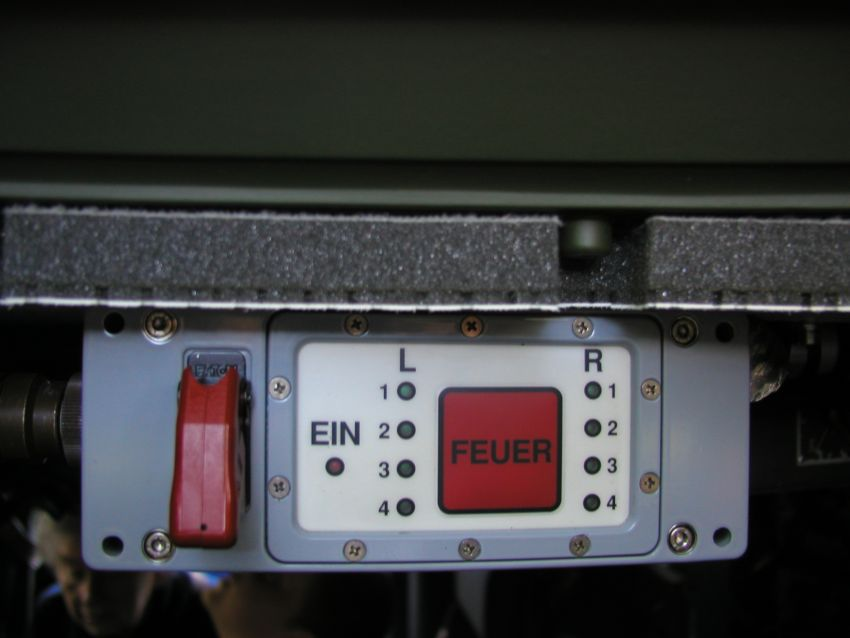
Ignition of the smoke grenade launchers of a German Army Fennek

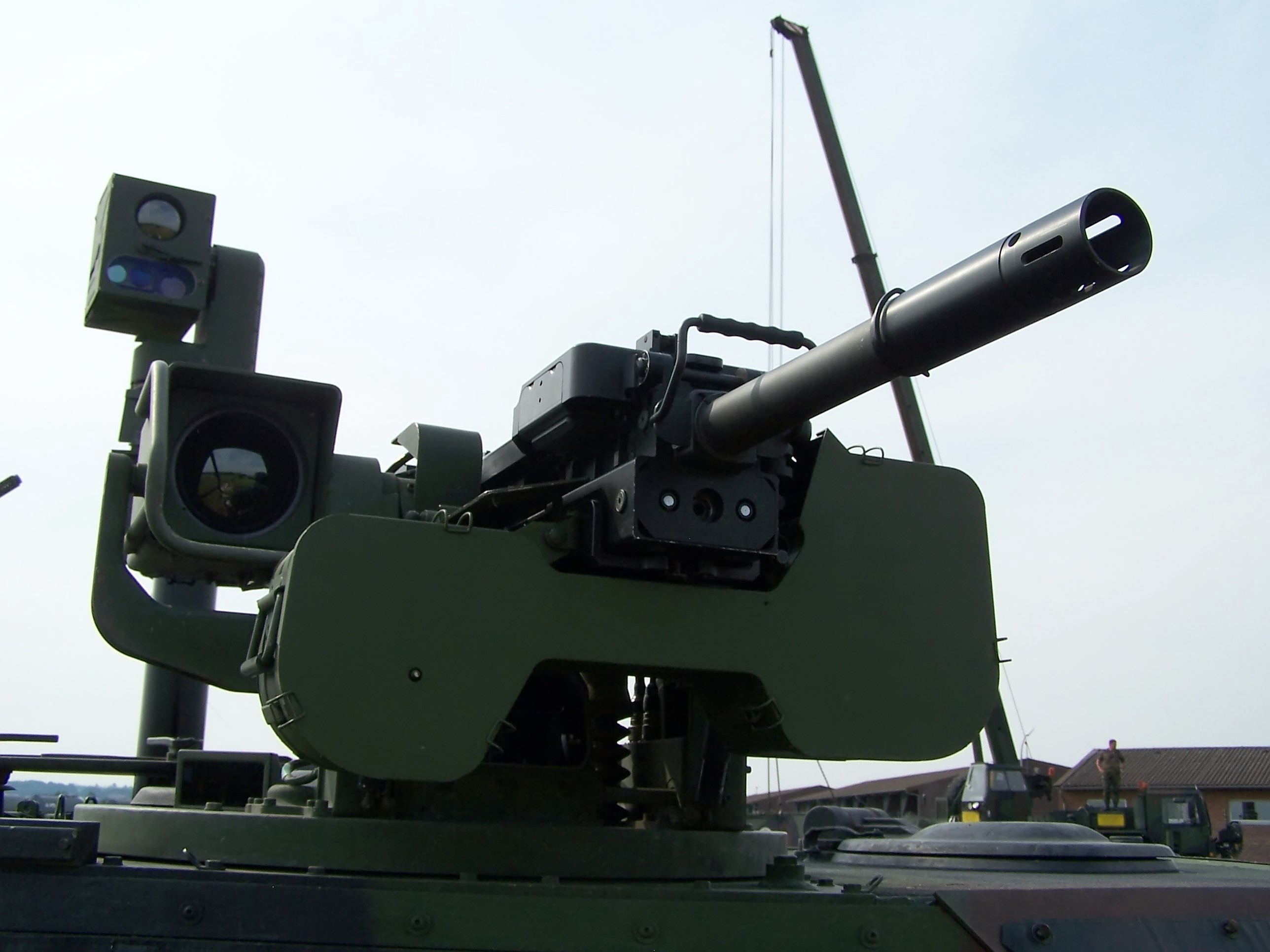
Heckler & Koch GMG on board a German Army Fennek

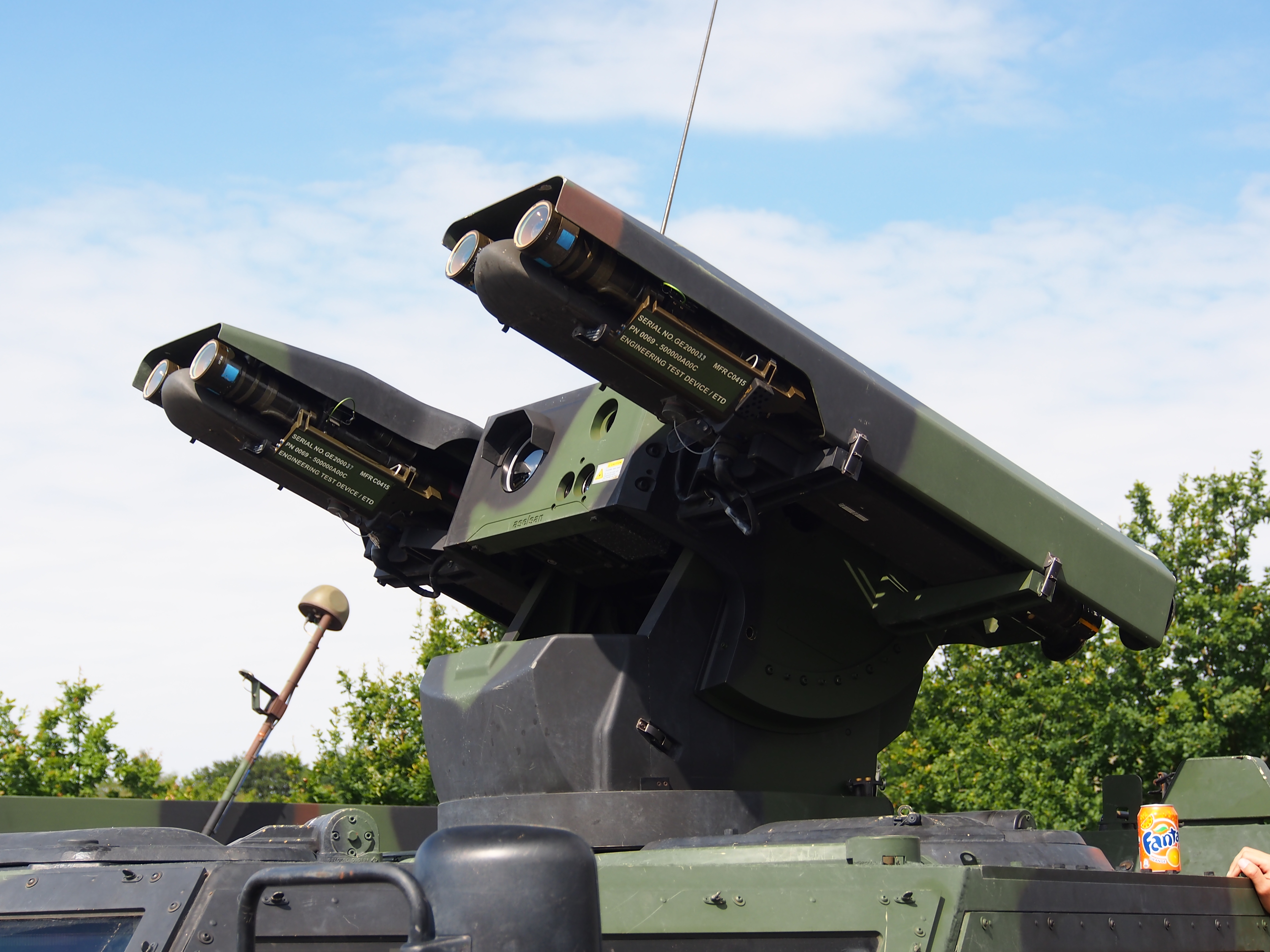
ASELSAN MFR C0415 with 4 FIM-92 Stinger missiles on board a Dutch Army Fennek

== See also ==
"Combat Reconnaissance/Patrol Vehicle" with rear engine:

- RBY MK 1 – (Israel)
- D-442 FÚG – (Hungarian People's Republic)
- ABC-79M – (Romania)
- BRDM-2 – (Soviet Union)
- Textron Tactical Armoured Patrol Vehicle – (Canada)

Others:

- Armoured fighting vehicle
- List of modern armoured fighting vehicles
