= Operational Support Command Land =

- Operationeel Ondersteuningscommando Land (OOCL)
- Emblem of the OOCL
- Founded: 2009
- Country: Netherlands
- Branch: Royal Netherlands Army
- Type: Combat support Combat service support
- Size: 5000 personnel
- Part of: Commander of the Royal Netherlands Army
- Garrison/HQ: Frank van Bijnen Barracks in Apeldoorn

Commanders
- Current commander: Brigadier general Joland Dubbeldam

The Operational Support Command Land (Dutch: Operationeel Ondersteuningscommando Land, OOCL) is a support command of the Royal Netherlands Army. The command consists of multiple combat support and combat service support units that provide the army with a broad variety of services. The OOCL was established in 2009, with the simultaneous disbandment of 1 Logistics Brigade (1 Logistieke Brigade) and 101 Combat Support Brigade (101 Gevechtssteunbrigade).

== Units ==
=== Command & Control Support Command ===
The Command & Control Support Command (Command & Control Ondersteuningscommando, C2OstCo), is based in Stroe and provides the army with all types of communications. The command consists of three signal companies and the Signals Service School:

- Command & Control Support Command
  - A; B and C Signal Company
  - Signals Service School

=== Joint ISTAR Command ===
The Joint ISTAR Command (Joint ISTAR Commando, JISTARC) is based in 't Harde, and is tasked with collecting, analysing and sharing intelligence. The command consist of the following units:

- Joint ISTAR Command
  - Staff Squadron (Stafeskadron)
  - 102 Electronic Warfare Company (102 Elektronische Oorlogsvoering compagnie)
  - 104 JISTARC Reconnaissance Squadron (104 JISTARC Verkenningseskadron), with Fennek light armoured reconnaissance vehicles
  - 105 Field HUMINT Squadron (105 Field Humint-eskadron)
  - 106 Intelligence Squadron (106 Inlichtingeneskadron)
  - 107 Aerial Systems Battery (107 Aerial Systems Batterij), with RQ-11B DDL Raven, Q-27 ScanEagle, RQ-21A Integrator unmanned aerial vehicles
  - 108 Technical Exploitation Intelligence Company (108 Technical Exploitation Intelligence-compagnie)
  - 109 Open-source Intelligence Company (109 Open Sources Intelligence-compagnie)

=== Fire Support Command ===
The Fire Support Command (Vuursteun Commando, VustCo) is based in 't Harde, and is responsible for providing the Dutch armed forces with ground-based fire support. The command consists of the following units:

- Fire Support Command, in 't Harde
  - 11 Horse Artillery Battalion (11 Afdeling Rijdende Artillerie; supports 43 Mechanized Brigade)
    - Headquarters Battery (Stafbatterij)
    - C and D Battery, each with 9× Panzerhaubitze 2000 self-propelled howitzers
  - 41 Field Artillery Battalion (41 Afdeling Veldartillerie; supports 13 Light Brigade)
    - Headquarters Battery (Stafbatterij)
    - A and B Battery, each with 9× Panzerhaubitze 2000 self-propelled howitzers
  - Fire Support School (Vuursteunschool)
  - Artillery Fire Range (Artillerieschietkamp)

=== Communications and Engagement Command ===
The Communicatie en Engagement Commando (formerly the 1 Civil-military Interaction Command) is based in Apeldoorn. It specialises in various forms of interactions between the army and non-military parties, such as local populations and NGOs, and psychological operations. It received its new name on 1 March 2026. It originated as the CIMIC Battalion, which became the Civil-Military Interaction Command in October 2013. The command, under a lieutenant-colonel, specialises in the following disciplines:

- Culture and Education
- Public governance
- Infrastructure
- Human Rights and Healthcare
- Economy, Employment, Agriculture and Cattle
- Development of Small Businesses

Its companies focus on operational CIMIC and psychological operations; socio-cultural expertise of (potential) mission areas and cultural heritage operations; and it also supervises a network of specialist reservists with a wide ranges of civilian knowledge.

=== Supply and Transport Command ===
The Supply and Transport Command (Bevoorradings- en Transportcommando) is based in Stroe, and is tasked with the supply and transport for missions, exercises and foreign deployments. The command consist of the following units:

- Supply and Transport Command
  - Staff Company (Stafcompagnie)
  - 110 and 220 Transport Company (Transportcompagnie)
  - 130 and 230 Base Company (Clustercompagnie)
  - 140 Heavy Transport Company (140 Zwaar Transportcompagnie)
  - 210 Regional Transport Company (210 Regionale Vervoerscompagnie)
  - 240 Service Company (240 Dienstencompagnie)

=== 101 Engineer Battalion ===
The 101 Engineer Battalion (101 Geniebataljon) is based in Wezep, and is tasked with the construction and maintenance of military infrastructure such as roads, buildings and bridges. The battalion consists of the following units:

- 101 Engineer Battalion
  - 101 Staff Company (101 Stafcompagnie)
  - 102 and 103 Construction Company (Constructiecompagnieën)
  - 105 Hydraulic Engineer Company (105 Geniecompagnie Waterbouw)

=== 400 Medical Battalion ===
The 400 Medical Battalion (400 Geneeskundig Bataljon) is based in Ermelo, and provides medical services to the Dutch armed forces. The battalion consists of the following units:

- 400 Medical Battalion
  - Staff and Support Company (Staff & Ondersteuningscompagnie)
  - 420; 421; 422 and 423 Hospital Company (Hospitaalcompagnie)
  - 430 Ambulance Company
  - 480 (Maritime) Hospital Company

480 (Maritime) Hospital Company is located the main Royal Netherlands Navy operating base in Den Helder and is dedicated to operate aboard Navy ships.

=== Defence Explosive Ordnance Disposal Service ===
The Defence Explosive Ordnance Disposal Service (Explosieven Opruimingsdienst Defensie) is based in Soesterberg, and is responsible for land and maritime explosive ordnance disposal. The service consists of the following units:

- Defence Explosive Ordnance Disposal Service
  - Ground-based Company (Grondgebonden compagnie)
  - Maritime Company (Maritieme compagnie)
  - Research Institute (Kenniscentrum)
  - EOD School (EOD-school)

=== Land Forces Command Staff Support Group ===
The Land Forces Command Staff Support Group (Ondersteuningsgroep CLAS) is based in Arnhem, and comprises various support and ceremonial units. The group consists of the following elements:

- Land Forces Command Staff Support Group
  - Royal Military Band "Johan Willem Friso" (Koninklijke Militaire Kapel "Johan Willem Friso)
  - Regimental Fanfare Garde Grenadiers en Jagers (Regimentsfanfare Garde Grenadiers en Jagers)
  - Mounted Units Regimental Fanfare (Regimentsfanfare Bereden Wapens)
  - National Reserve Korps Fanfare (Fanfare Korps Nationale Reserve)
  - Honorary Cavalry Escort (Cavalerie Ere Escorte)
  - Defense Geography Service (Dienst Geografie Defensie)
  - Military Penitentiary Center (Militair Penitentiair Centrum)(in Stroe)
  - Individual Transmission Office - Security Sector Reform (Bureau Individual Uitzendingen - Security Sector Reform)
  - Internal Security Service (Interne Dienstverlening)
  - Military Court (Militaire Rechtbank)
