= Royal Netherlands Army Artillery =

The Royal Netherlands Army Artillery provides artillery support for the Royal Netherlands Army. It is divided into three corps, undertaking two roles: Korps Veldartillerie - Field Artillery and Korps Rijdende Artillerie - Horse Artillery. These two corps undertake the field artillery role. They are equipped primarily with the PzH2000 and were fitted with the M109 howitzer. Until 2013, one regiment retained the traditions of the Veldartillerie and one of the Rijdende Artillerie, with one assigned to each of the army's mechanised brigades.

In 2013, following a series of defence cuts, the two artillery regiments were amalgamated into a single unit called the Fire Support Command (VuursteunCommando). The FSC has four fire support batteries and an HQ battery, two of which are Veldartillerie and another two, together with the HQ battery, are Rijdende Artillerie. In 2025, the FSC will be split again, with one FA and one Horse Artillery battalion each carrying the traditions of the two artillery branches.

== Korps Luchtdoelartillerie ==
The third corps is Korps Luchtdoelartillerie - Air Defence Artillery. It undertakes the air defence role. Three individual batteries were equipped with Stinger man-portable air defence missiles and the Cheetah armoured air defence vehicle (a variation of the Leopard 1) and are assigned to the three mechanised brigades. The rest of the unit is assigned to provide air defence for other vital areas.

Korps Luchtdoelartillerie consists of the Air Defence Command (Commando Luchtdoelartillerie). 11 Air Defense Company (Air Assault) Samarinda (part of 11 Luchtmobiele Brigade) is considered part of the Air Defense Artillery Regiment, but is an independent Air Defense Company and part of the infantry Regiment Van Heutsz. It is composed mostly of infantry. To avoid confusion, it was named a company rather than a battery.

As of 2007, the Air Defence Command (Colua) is located at [De Peel Air Base] and equipped with the NASAMS 2 Army Ground-Based Air Defense Systems (Army GBADS). The regiment consists of a Joint Air Defense Center, a Staff battery, the 11th Air Defense battery, the 13th Air Defense battery, an instruction and training battery and the Joint Air Defense School.

Each of the two Air Defense batteries consists of a staff platoon, three Stinger Weapon Platform platoons and a NASAMS 2 Fire Unit (FU). The SWP are available in two variants: The SWP [Fennek] is a four-wheeled armored vehicle with the [Aselsan] ready to fire a Stinger surface-to-air missile launcher. The Mercedes-Benz G290GD four-wheel drive light transport vehicle, with a Dual Mounted Stinger (DMS) on a tripod, offers two Stingers ready to fire.

By integrating the Low-Level Air Picture (LLAP) with both VSHORAD missile systems into the wireless GBADS network, which is JTIDS (Joint Tactical Information Distribution System) capable, they can bring the Recognized Air Picture (RAP) to the SWPs. This is a unique capacity and a powerful attribute of NATINEADS (NATO INtegrated and Extended Air Defense System).

Besides the SWPs, the Air Defense batteries have a NASAMS II (Norwegian Advanced Surface to Air Missile System II) Fire Unit (FU). Each FU consists of an FDC (Fire Distribution Centre), an MPQ-64 Sentinel radar, and 3 Launchers with 6 AIM-120B (SL)AMRAAMs ((Surface Launched) Advanced Medium Range Air to Air Missile) each.

The sensor capacity of the GBADS-network consists, besides the MPQ-64 and LLAPI (LLAP Interface), of five TRML (Telefunken Radar Mobil Luftraumuberwachung) radars. These Medium range, modular, highly reliable, countermeasures-resistant, 3D, C-band, self-contained, mobile radar systems are capable of detecting a real target with a small RCS ([Radar Cross Section]) like Cruise Missiles and U(C)AV's (Unmanned Aerial (Combat) Vehicles), even at low attitudes.

== Joint Air Defense command ==
On September 23, 2009, it was announced by the Commander Royal Netherlands Army Commander, Commander Peter van Uhm, that all ground-based air defense units, including the Air Force's Guided Weapons Group (GGW), would be merged into a single Joint Air Defense Command at De Peel Air Base.
