= Royal Netherlands Army =

Land branch of the Netherlands Armed Forces

- Koninklijke Landmacht
- Emblem of the Royal Netherlands Army
- Founded: 1572; 454 years ago
- Country: Netherlands
- Type: Army
- Role: Land warfare
- Size: 26,606 personnel (2025): 17,806 active military personnel; 3,927 civilian personnel; 4,873 reservists
- Part of: Netherlands Armed Forces
- Headquarters: Kromhoutkazerne, Utrecht
- Engagements: List of engagements: Eighty Years' War; Dano-Swedish War; Franco-Dutch War; Nine Years' War; War of the Spanish Succession; French Revolutionary Wars; Anglo-Russian invasion of Holland; Battle of Friedland; Peninsular War; French invasion of Russia; Hundred Days War; Battle of Waterloo; Belgian Revolution; Second World War; Korean War; Indonesian National Revolution; Cold War; Operation Trikora; Gulf War; Implementation Force; Stabilisation Force; Kosovo War; War on terror; Iraq War; War in Afghanistan; International military intervention against ISIL

Commanders
- Commander: Lt Gen Jan Swillens
- Deputy commander: Maj Gen Jean Paul Duckers
- Army Adjutant: AOO Cees Bielander

Insignia
- Flag (Restricted use)

- Flag

- Logo

The Royal Netherlands Army (Dutch: Koninklijke Landmacht, KL) is the land branch of the Netherlands Armed Forces. Though the Royal Netherlands Army was raised on 9 January 1814, its origins date back to 1572, when the Staatse Leger was raised, making the Dutch standing army one of the oldest in the world. It fought in the Napoleonic Wars, World War II, the Indonesian War of Independence and the Korean War, as well as served with NATO on the Cold War frontiers in West Germany from the 1950s to the 1990s.

Since 1990, the army has been sent into the Iraq War (from 2003) and into the War in Afghanistan, as well as deployed in several United Nations' peacekeeping missions (notably with UNIFIL in Lebanon, UNPROFOR in Bosnia-Herzegovina and MINUSMA in Mali).

The tasks of the Royal Netherlands Army are laid out in the Constitution of the Netherlands: defend the territory of the Kingdom of the Netherlands (including the Dutch Caribbean) and all of its allies, protect and advance the international legal order and to support the (local) government in law enforcement, disaster relief and humanitarian aid, both nationally and internationally. The supreme authority over the Armed Forces of the Netherlands is exercised by the government (consisting of the King and the cabinet ministers); there is thus no constitutional supreme commander. However, army personnel do swear allegiance to the Dutch monarch.

Dutch army doctrine strongly emphasises international co-operation. The Netherlands are a founding member of, and strong contributor to NATO, while closely co-operating with fellow member states during European Union–led missions as well. Moreover, the successful Dutch-German military co-operation is seen as a harbinger of European defence integration, facing fewer linguistic and cultural issues than the comparable Franco-German Brigade. The Netherlands cooperates with Germany in the Competence Centre Surface Based Air and Missile Defence (CC SABMD) at Ramstein Air Base. In 2014, the 11 Airmobile Brigade was integrated into the Rapid Forces Division; in 2016, the Dutch-German 414 Tank Battalion was integrated into the 43rd Mechanised Brigade, which was in turn integrated into the 1st Panzer Division. In 2023, the final brigade of the Royal Netherlands Army, the 13th Light Brigade, was integrated into the 10th Panzer Division of the German Bundeswehr.

Additionally, the German Air Defence Missile Group 61 (German: Flugabwehrraketengruppe 61) was integrated into the Dutch Joint Ground-based Air Defence Command in 2018.

== History ==
=== Origins ===
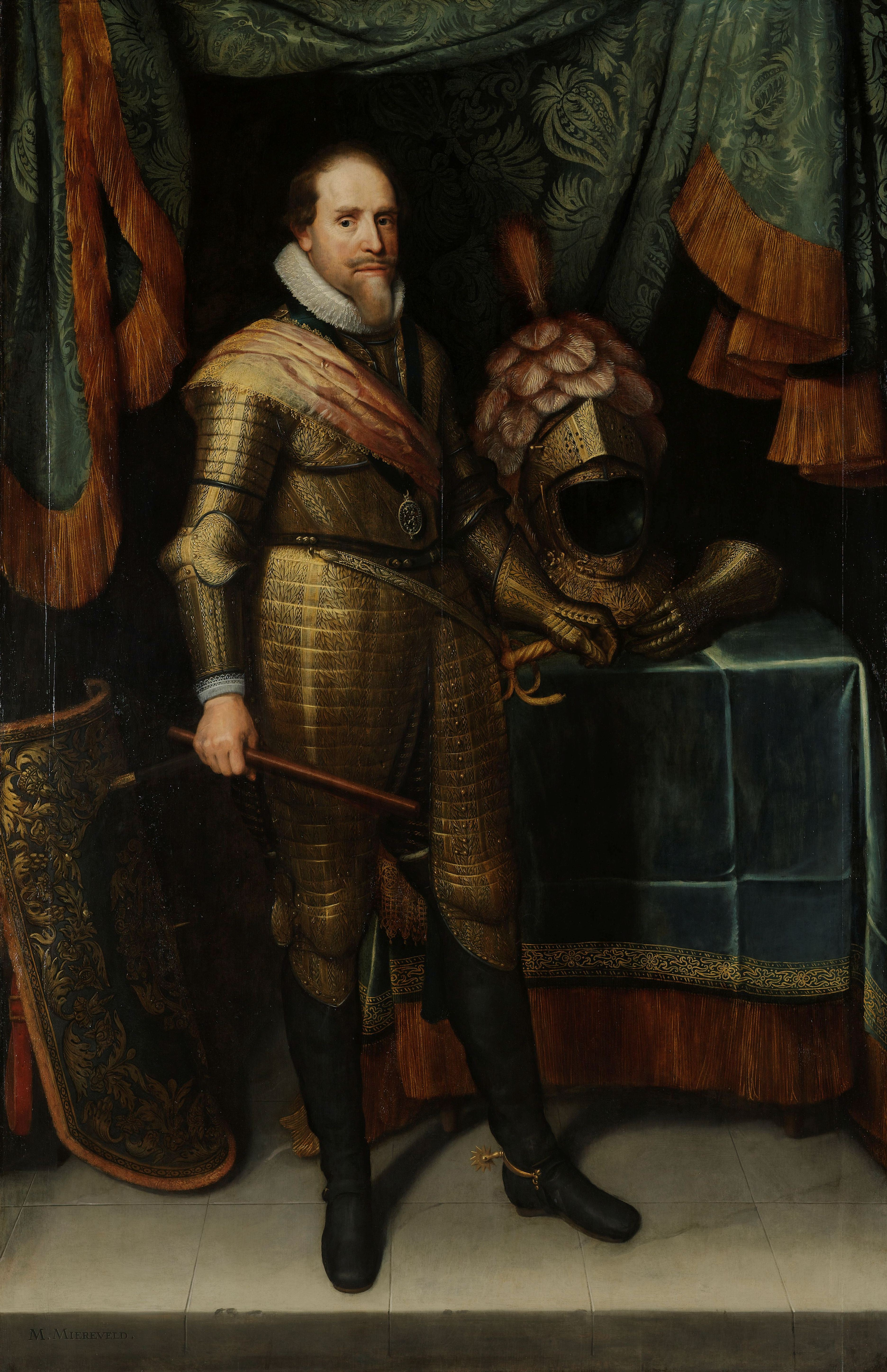
Maurice of Orange as portrayed by Michiel van Mierevelt, between c. 1613–1620.

The Royal Netherlands Army was raised on 9 January 1814, but its origins date back to the founding of the Staatse Leger (the Army of the Dutch States) in 1572: the creation of one of the first modern standing armies. Under the command of famous commanders such as Maurice of Orange and William Louis of Nassau-Dillenburg, the army developed widely.

The Dutch States Army of the Dutch Republic saw action in the Eighty Years' War, the Dano-Swedish War, the Franco-Dutch War, the Nine Years' War, the War of Spanish Succession, the War of Austrian Succession, as well as the French Revolutionary Wars.

=== French period (1795–1814) ===
With the French conquest of the Netherlands, the Staatse Leger was replaced by the army of the Batavian Republic in 1795, which in turn was replaced by the army of the Kingdom of Holland in 1806. This army fought beside the French, to repel the Anglo-Russian invasion of Holland in 1799 and to wage several campaigns in Germany, Austria, and Spain between 1800 and 1810; particularly notable were the engagements of the Horse Artillery (Korps Rijdende Artillerie) at the Battle of Friedland in 1807, the capture of the city of Stralsund in 1807 and 1809, and the participation of the Dutch brigade in the Peninsular War between 1808 and 1810. The independent army was disbanded in 1810, when Napoleon decided to integrate the Netherlands into France ("La Hollande est reunie à l'Empire"): Dutch military units became part of the Grande Armée (the present-day French 126th Infantry Regiment has Dutch origins). Dutch military elements participated in the disastrous French invasion of Russia in 1812, and the actions of the Pontonniers company under Captain Benthien at the Berezina River (Battle of Berezina) are especially noteworthy. New research points out that, contrary to long-held belief, around half of the Dutch contingent of the Grande Armée survived the Russian Campaign.

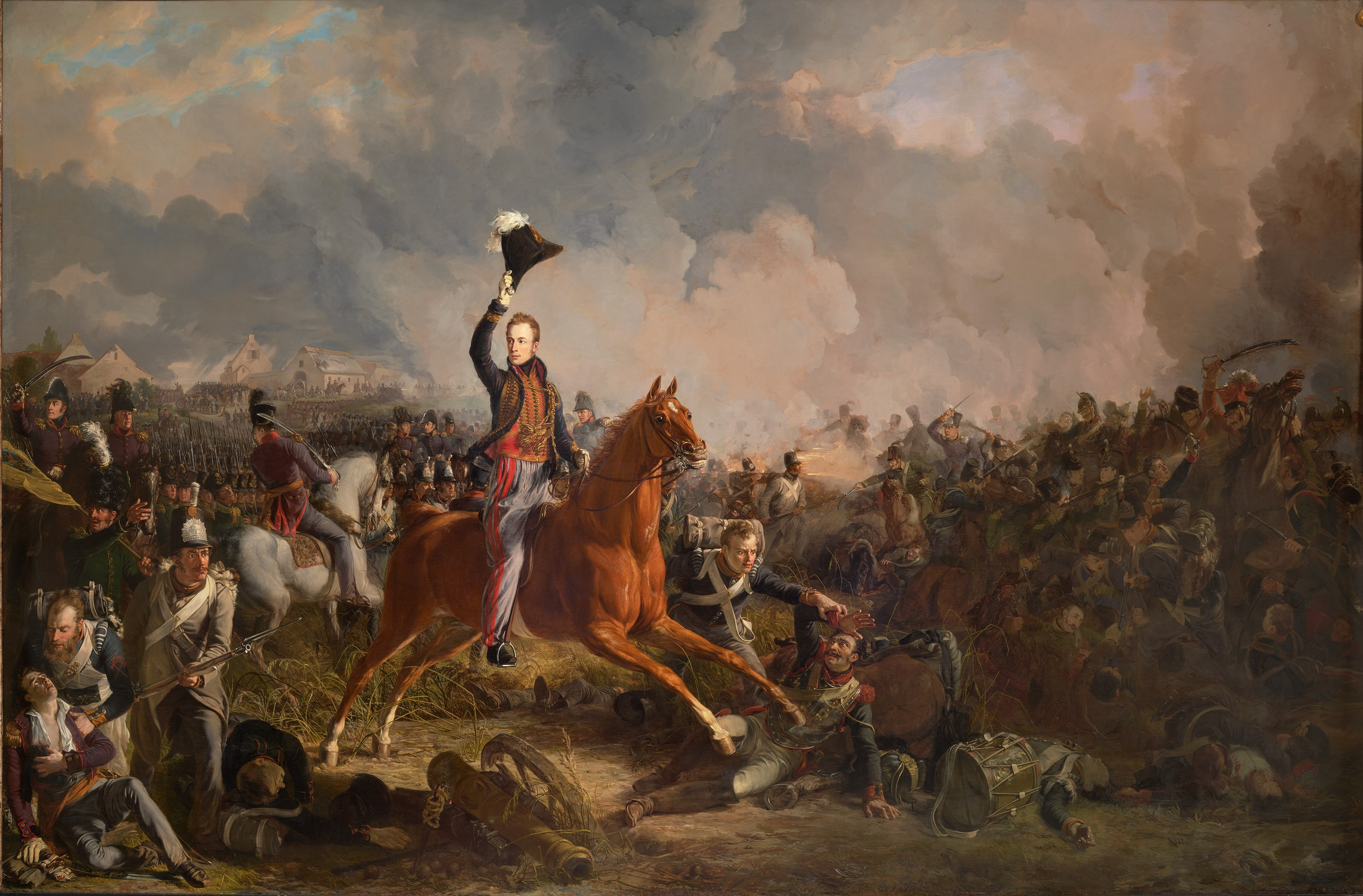
The Prince of Orange at Quatre Bras by Jan Willem Pieneman, 1818. The future William II at the Battle of Quatre Bras.

=== Kingdom of the Netherlands (1814–1914) ===
In 1814, a year after the return of William I of the Netherlands to Scheveningen and the Orangist uprising against Napoleonic rule, an independent Dutch army was reformed by the new Kingdom of the United Netherlands. Several militias of the Dutch States Army were integrated into this newly formed Netherlands Mobile Army, and it became an integral part of the allied army during the Hundred Days campaign that culminated in the Battle of Waterloo. Units such as Baron Chassé's were essential to securing victory for the allied army. The army was involved in various conflicts since 1814, including the Waterloo campaign (1815) and different colonial wars (1825–1925).

During the Belgian Revolution, from 1830 to 1832, the army was deployed to restore order in the southern provinces. After initial Dutch military success and widespread Belgian defeat during battles of the Ten Days' Campaign, the Belgian rebels appealed to France for military support. The severely outnumbered Dutch troops were forced to retreat when the French agreed to send reinforcements.

=== World wars (1914–1945) ===
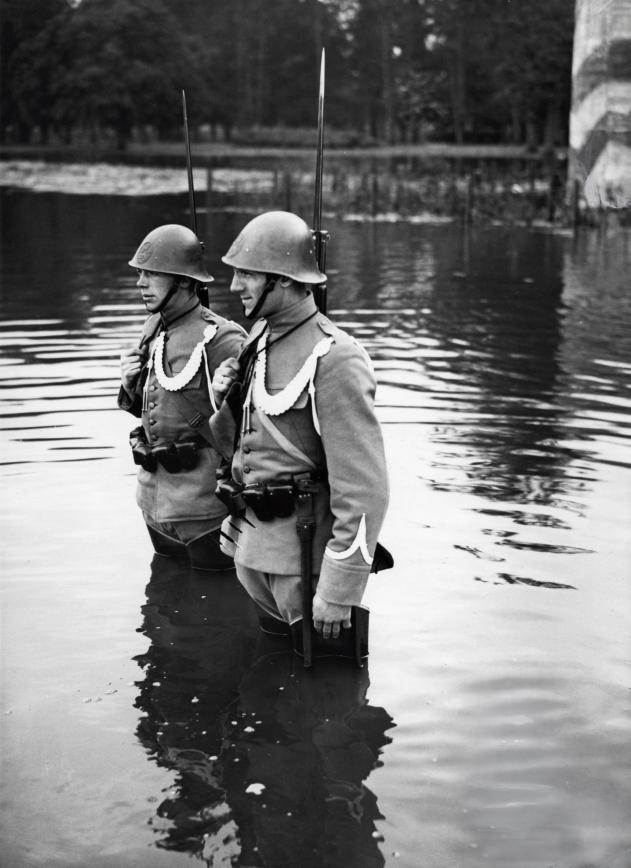
Soldiers on guard in the inundated area of the Dutch Water Line during the mobilization of the army in 1939.

The Netherlands continued the policy of neutrality during World War I. This stance arose partly from a strict policy of neutrality in international affairs that started in 1830 with the secession of Belgium. Dutch neutrality was not guaranteed by the major powers in Europe however, nor was it a part of the Dutch constitution. The country's neutrality was based on the belief that its strategic position between the German Empire, German-occupied Belgium, and the British guaranteed its safety. The Dutch military strategy was aimed exclusively at defence and rested to a large extent on the Dutch Water Line, a defensive ring of rivers and lowland surrounding the core Dutch region of Holland, that could be inundated.

At the beginning of the Second World War, the I Corps was the force strategic reserve and was located in the Vesting Holland, around The Hague, Leiden, Haarlem and in the Westland. The German invasion posed a complete surprise for the army command and shocked the Dutch population. While the Royal Netherlands Army initially managed to slow down the German advance and fought back in intense battles, such as the Battle for The Hague, the Battle of Rotterdam and the Battle of the Afsluitdijk, the devastating German bombing of Rotterdam and the threat of bombing the city of Utrecht forced the Dutch supreme command to capitulate.

The Royal Netherlands army was disbanded during the German occupation, however army personnel continued the battle against the German occupiers during the war. Army resistance began to rise again with the formation of the Princess Irene Brigade and No. 2 (Dutch) Troop (predecessor to the Korps Commandotroepen) as part of the Free Dutch Forces in exile, and with army personnel active in the Dutch resistance. In the East, the Royal Netherlands East Indies Army was defeated by the Japanese in 1942; few elements managed to escape. Today's army grew out of the wartime force, starting with the liberation of parts of the Netherlands in 1944; the Dutch had plans to contribute a 200,000 strong army to the defeat of Germany and Japan.

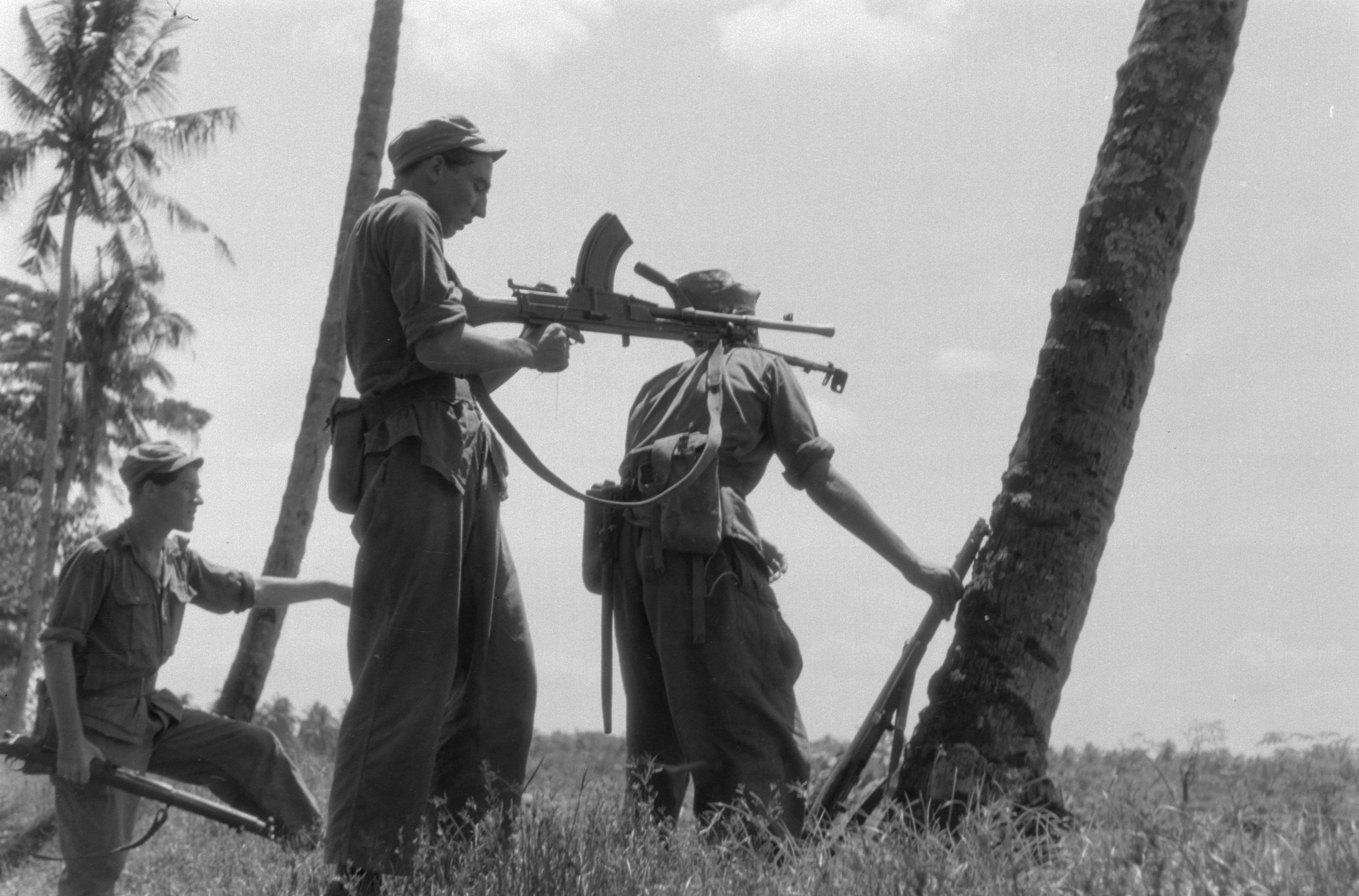
Soldiers of the 15th Infantry Regiment advancing on East-Java in 1948, the Bren-gunner adjusts his sights.

=== Decolonisation and Cold War (1945–1991) ===
==== Dutch East Indies ====
Between 1945 and 1949, the Royal Netherlands Army, which originally used mainly war volunteers but later was heavily dependent on conscripts, was deployed to the Dutch East Indies during the Indonesian War of Independence. To restore Dutch authority in the Dutch East Indies, the expeditionary land force First Division "7 December" was established in 1946. Approximately 25,000 volunteers and 95,000 conscripts were deployed to the East during the conflict, 4,751 servicemen were killed.

==== Cold War ====
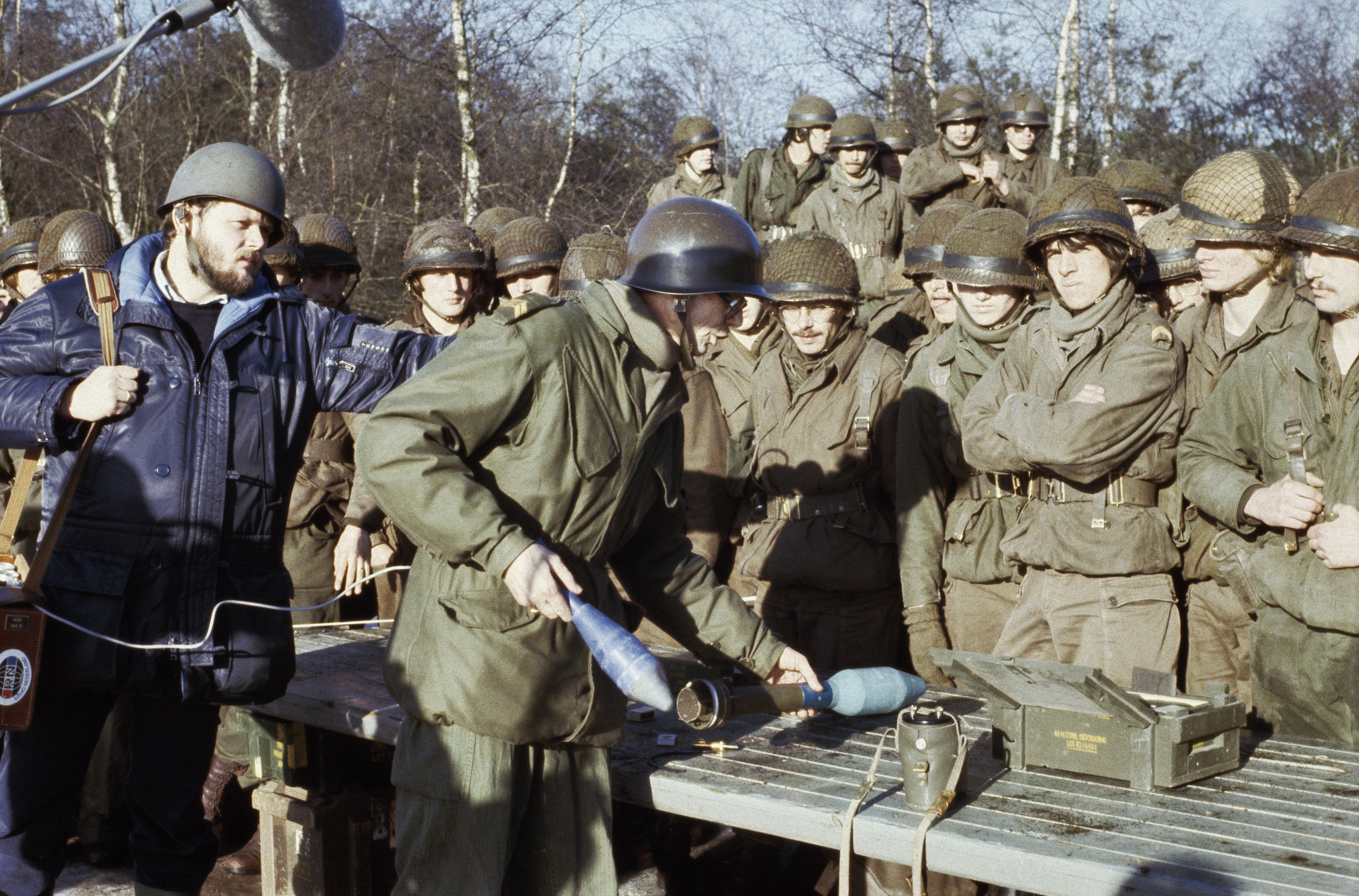
Exercises of the Dutch Infantry Battalion in 1978

During the Korean War, 4,748 members of the army, the Royal Netherlands Navy and the Netherlands Marine Corps formed the Nederlands Detachement Verenigde Naties and were dispatched to East Asia to fight against the troops of the People's Republic of China and North Korea. 122 soldiers were killed in action, 3 soldiers went missing in action.

State Secretary of Defense Calmeyer, opens the new armored infantry education center in Veldhoven in 1963, after which light tanks of the type AMX-13 and AMX-VCI tracked vehicles move by in a procession.

The I Corps (Netherlands) stood watch alongside its NATO allies in Germany during the Cold War. The corps consisted of three divisions during the 1980s, the 1st, 4th, and 5th (reserve) divisions. It was part of the NATO Northern Army Group. The corps' war assignment, as formulated by Commander, Northern Army Group (COMNORTHAG), would be to:

- Assume responsibility for its corps sector and relieve 1st German Corps forces as soon as possible.
- Fight the covering force battle in accordance with COMNORTHAG's concept of operations.
- In the main defensive battle: (1) hold and destroy the forces of the enemy's leading armies conventionally as far east as possible, maintaining cohesion with 1 (GE) Corps; (2) in the event of a major penetration affecting 1 (NL) Corps sector, be prepared to hold the area between the roads A7 and B3 and to conduct a counterattack according to COMNORTHAG's concept of operations.
- Maintain cohesion with LANDJUT and secure NORTHAG's left flank in the Forward Combat Zone.

Dutch army troops have deployed to Lebanon as part of an international protection force since 1979 War in Lebanon, 1979–1985 UNIFIL. Of the 9,084 soldiers who served in Lebanon, 9 soldiers were killed in action.

At the height of the Cold War the Dutch army had almost 1,000 tanks in service.

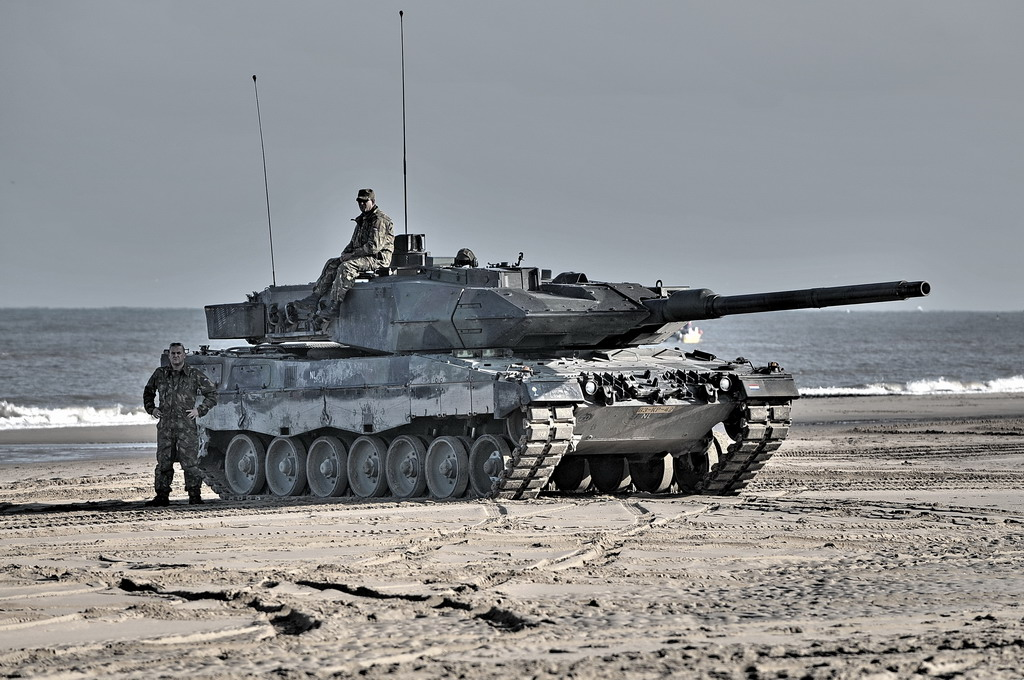
Dutch Leopard 2 main battle tank on the beach of Scheveningen, 2008.

=== Recent history (1991–present) ===
The Fall of the Iron Curtain and the ensuing end of the Cold War has had a significant impact on the Dutch armed forces as a whole, but on the army in particular. Mandatory conscription was suspended and surplus equipment deemed unnecessary was sold. An airmobile brigade was formed and co-operation with allied countries, Germany in particular, was intensified. The I (NL) Corps was reduced to the First Division "7 December" in 1995, which became part of the newly established I. German/Dutch Corps, and consequently the division headquarters itself was disbanded. In addition, the army increasingly concentrated on peace-keeping and peace-enforcing operations and has been involved in several operations in the former Yugoslavia (1991–present), but also in Cambodia (1992–1994), Haiti (1995–1996), Cyprus (1998–1999), Eritrea and Ethiopia (2001), and most recent in Iraq (2003–2005), Afghanistan (2002–present), Chad (2008–2009) and Mali (2014–2019).

As mentioned, peace dividend was collected throughout the 1990s, 2000s and early 2010s resulting in a dramatic downsizing in both budget and size. Of a total of 445 Leopard 2 MBTs originally purchased, 114 tanks and 1 turret were sold to Austria, 100 to Canada, 57 to Norway, 1 driver training tank and 10 turrets to Germany and 38 to Portugal (1 driver training tank). On 8 April 2011, the Dutch Ministry of Defense dissolved the last tank unit and sold the remaining Leopard tanks due another series of large budget cuts while also dismissing 6,000 servicemen and women. On 18 May 2011, the last Leopard 2 fired the final shot at the Bergen-Hohne Training Area. In 2014, the Dutch defence budget hit a new low, 7.4 billion euros (1.09% of GDP), resulting in the combat readiness of both personnel and equipment being subpar. The negative trend was broken from 2015 onwards due to a perceived shifting international security situation. The attitude towards defence changed, mainly caused by increasing tensions with Russia (caused by the downing of the MH17 flight and the annexation of Crimea) and the rise of the Islamic State, resulting in the defence budget seeing an increase of over 50 percent between 2014 and 2020, amounting to 11.04 billion euros (1.35% of GDP) in 2020. Due to the war in the Ukraine, the budget rises sharply, in 2025 amounting a total budget of 23.4 billion. The budget will grow to around 30 billion euros in 2030. In September 2024 it was announced that the Netherlands will acquire new tanks.

==== Bosnia ====
Dutch army personnel was deployed to Bosnia between 1994 and 1995 to, as part of the UN peace force UNPROFOR, to restrain the escalating ethnic violence of the Bosnian War. Three infantry battalion (known as Dutchbats) of the, at the time, recently established 11 Air Assault Brigade were sequentially deployed to guard the United Nations Safe Areas of any possible threats. This mission became infamous following the Siege of Srebrenica and the ensuing Srebrenica massacre. Bosnian Serb troops under the command of general Ratko Mladic, sentenced to life imprisonment on accounts of participating in genocide, crimes against humanity, and war crimes in 2017, invaded the enclave of Srebrenica and subsequently deported and massacred a large share of the present Bosniak men and boys.

==== Iraq ====
A contingent of 1,345 troops (comprising Army and Dutch Marines, supported by Royal Netherlands Air Force helicopters) was deployed to Iraq in 2003, based at Camp Smitty near As Samawah (Southern Iraq) with responsibility for the Muthanna Province, as part of the Multinational force in Iraq. On 1 June 2004, the Dutch government renewed their stay through 2005. The Netherlands pulled its troops out of Iraq in March 2005, leaving half a dozen liaison officers until late 2005. The Netherlands lost two soldiers in separate attacks.

From 2015 until the spring of 2018, Dutch special operations forces (KCT and NLMARSOF) deployed advice and assist (A&A) teams to northern Iraq in co-operation with the Belgian Special Forces Group. During this deployment, they provided support to Kurdish Peshmerga and Iraqi Army forces before, during and after operations in the battle against ISIL, as part of the Combined Joint Task Force – Operation Inherent Resolve. The Netherlands currently deploy approximately 60 troops to Iraq.

==== Afghanistan ====
Between 2001 and 2003, a reinforced army company was deployed to Afghanistan to provide support in maintaining public order, and providing security in and around the capital Kabul. In addition, military assistance was provided to the Afghan National Army and to local security troops. The troops were deployed under the command of NATO's International Security Assistance Force mission.

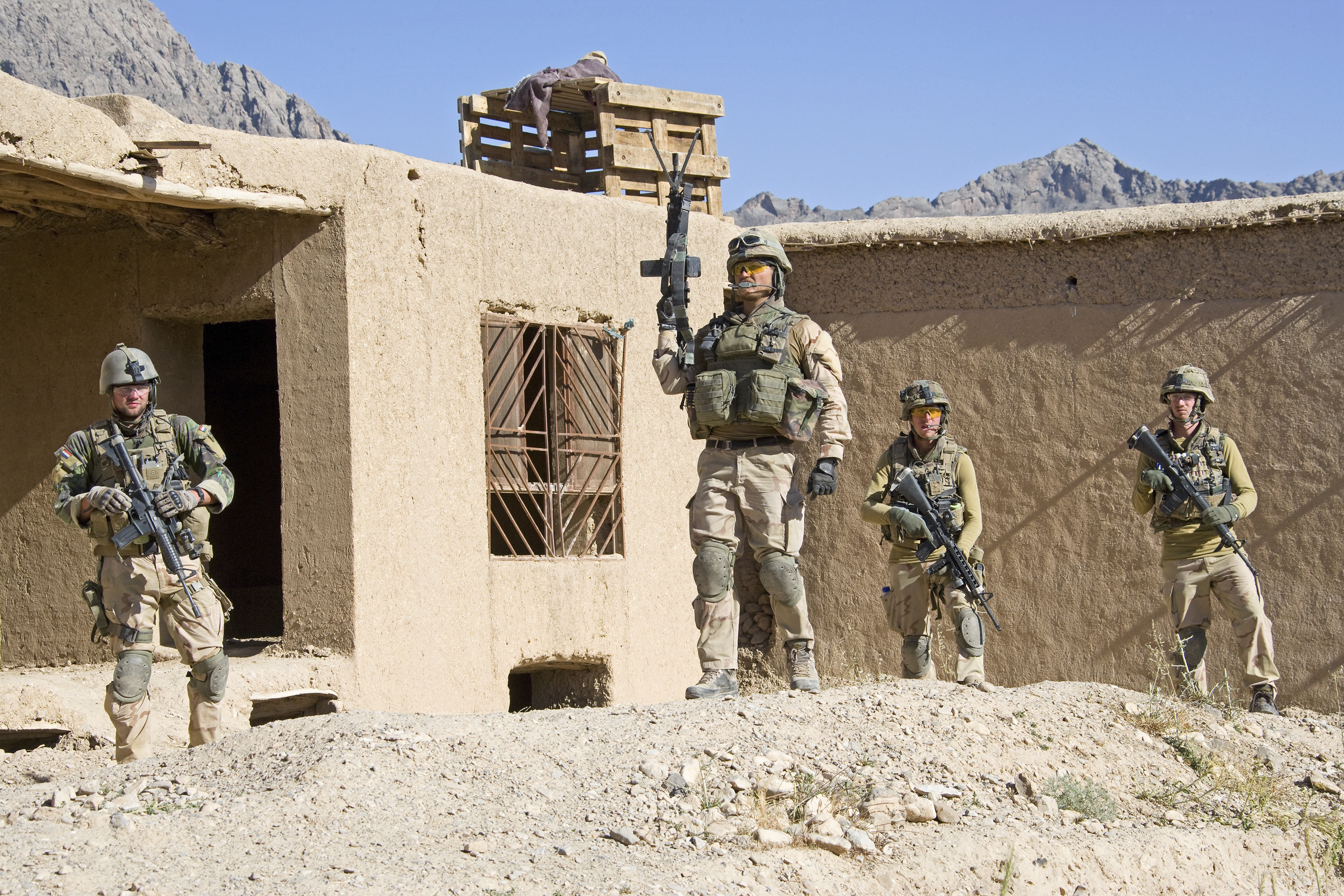
Dutch army forces searching a quala in Uruzgan, Afghanistan in 2009.

Between 2006 and 2010, the Netherlands deployed personnel to southern Afghanistan. Together with the Australian Defence Force, Dutch forces were assigned the province of Uruzgan as their area of operations. In mid-2006, Dutch special forces of the Korps Commandotroepen as part of the Deployment Task Force successfully deployed to Tarin Kowt to lay the ground for the increasing numbers of engineers who were due to build a base there. By August 2006 the Netherlands had deployed the majority of 1,400 troops to Uruzgan province in southern Afghanistan at Multi National Base Tarin Kot (Kamp Holland) in Tarin Kowt (1,200) and Kamp Hadrian in Deh Rahwod (200). PzH 2000 self-propelled artillery pieces were deployed and used in combat for the first time. The Dutch forces operated under the command of the ISAF Task Force Uruzgan and were involved in some of the more intensive combat operations in southern Afghanistan, including Operation Medusa and the Battle of Chora. On 18 April 2008, the second day of his command, the son of the Commander of the Royal Netherlands Army Lieutenant-general Peter van Uhm, Lieutenant Dennis van Uhm, was one of two servicemen killed by a road side explosion. As of 1 September 2008, the Netherlands had a total of 1,770 troops in Afghanistan excluding special forces troops. In total, 25 Dutch servicemen were killed in action during the deployment. All Dutch troops were withdrawn from Afghanistan by August 2010.

Since 2015, 160 Dutch troops from the Korps Commandotroepen (rotated with NLMARSOF) and multiple support elements are deployed to the Afghan city of Mazar-e-Sharif as part of NATO's Resolute Support Mission. Dutch troops co-operate with personnel of the German Kommando Spezialkräfte as part of the German-Dutch lead Special Operations Advisory Team (SOAT). The SOAT provides advice and assistance during operations to an Afghan police tactical unit, the Afghan Territorial Force-888 (ATF-888). The SOAT has been granted authority to deploy in the entirety of Afghanistan.

==== Mali ====
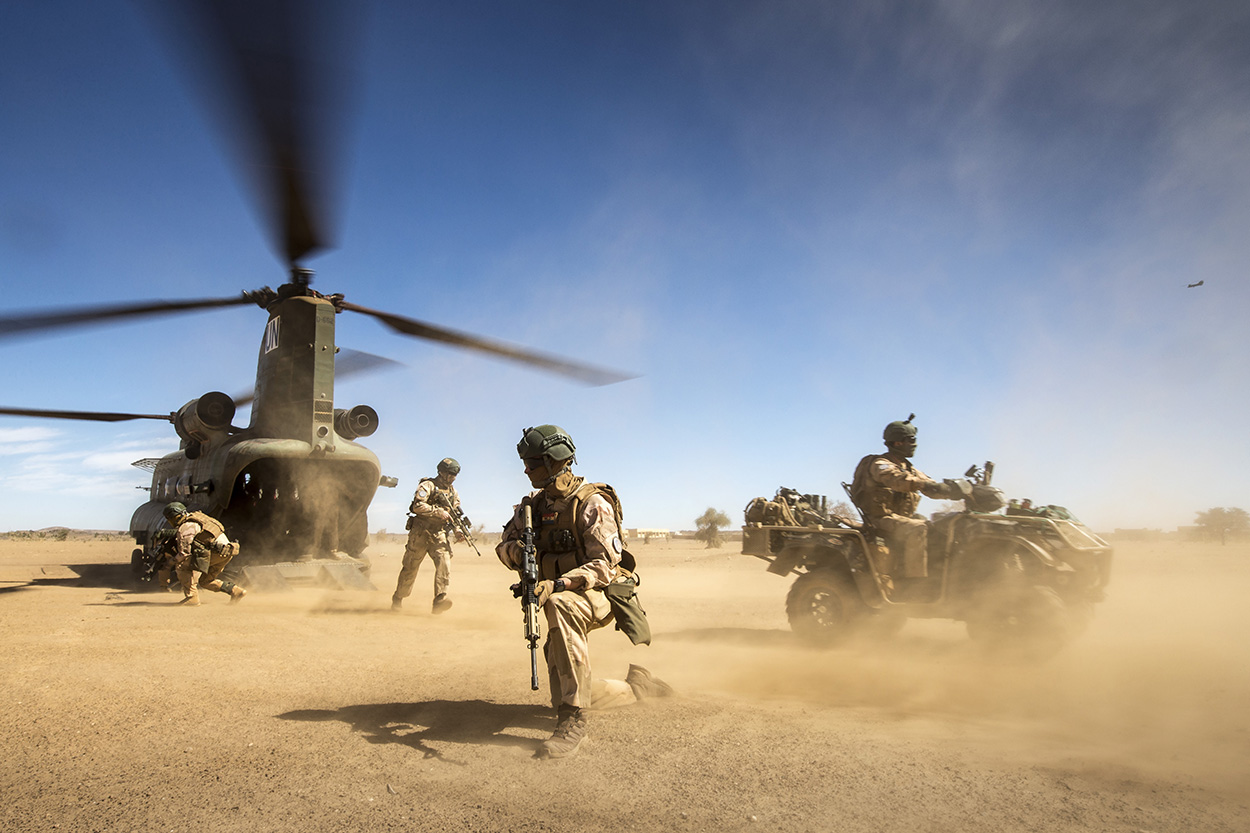
Soldiers of the 11th Airmobile Brigade disembark a CH-47 Chinook helicopter during a long-range reconnaissance patrol, north of Gao, Mali.

Special forces of the Korps Commandotroepen have been deployed to Mali since 2014 as part of the UN-mission MINUSMA. The primary task of the Dutch forces has been to gather intelligence concerning local Islamist groups and to protect the people of Mali against radical Islamist groups. Since 2016, personnel of 11th Airmobile Brigade and 13th Light Brigade have been included in rotations. On 6 July 2016, two servicemen of 11 Airmobile Brigade were killed during a mortar firing exercise, a third serviceman was severely wounded. The incident lead to the resignation of the minister of Defence Jeanine Hennis-Plasschaert and Chief of Defence Tom Middendorp after a critical report by the Dutch Safety Board found that the safety-standards were subpar. The Netherlands have ended their troop contribution to the peacekeeping mission in May 2019 to send troops to Afghanistan instead.

==== Lithuania ====
The cabinet of the Netherlands announced in 2016 that the Netherlands would contribute troops to the NATO Enhanced Forward Presence mission in Lithuania to protect and reassure countries on NATO's eastern flank—Baltic countries and Poland in particular—of their security following increased political tensions sparked by the Russo-Ukrainian War. The Dutch contribution currently equates to approximately 270 troops, integrated into a multinatinational battle group that is headed by Germany. Each rotation is composed of armoured infantry companies equipped with CV9035NL IFVs and Boxer AFVs, or artillery batteries equipped with PzH 2000NL self-propelled howitzers.

== Structure ==
The core fighting element of the army consists of three brigades: 11 Airmobile Brigade, 13 Light Brigade and 43 Mechanised Brigade. The number of full-time professional personnel is 21,225, in addition to around 4,046 reservists. The Royal Netherlands Army is a volunteer force; compulsory military service has not been abolished but has been suspended. The other three services, (the Royal Netherlands Navy, Royal Netherlands Air Force and Royal Marechaussee), are fully volunteer forces as well.

Brigade locations in 2020
- Land Forces Headquarters, in Utrecht
  - 11 Airmobile Brigade, in Schaarsbergen
  - 13 Light Brigade, in Oirschot
  - 43 Mechanised Brigade, in Havelte
  - Korps Commandotroepen, in Roosendaal
  - 1 (GE/NL) Corps, in Münster (Germany)
  - Joint Ground-based Air Defence Command, in Vredepeel
  - Operational Support Command Land, in Apeldoorn
  - Army Materiel Logistic Command, in Utrecht
  - Education and Training Command, in Amersfoort

== Traditions ==
Besides the hierarchical organisation, the Royal Netherlands Army upholds a traditional organisation in which a distinction exists between arms of services. This organisation is purely ceremonial. Generally speaking, combat and combat support units are organised in arms, and support units are organised in services. There are two exceptions: the Engineers and the Signals Service.

The arms and services can in turn be further divided into one, or multiple regiments. These administrative organisations safeguard the traditions of the operational units. Before the Second World War, regiments were merely given a number, with the exception of the Grenadiers and Jagers regiments. Since the 1950s however, the regiments were given a historical name. The function of a regiment is strictly ceremonial, and is intended to increase esprit de corps.

=== Arms ===
The Royal Netherlands Army consists of the following arms, and subsequent regiments and corps:

Regiment	Unit	Year	Insignia	Notes
Infantry Arm (Foot guards)
Garderegiment Grenadiers en Jagers	11 Infantry Battalion	1995		Established in 1995 through amalgamation of two regiments which were formed in 1829.
Garderegiment Fuseliers Prinses Irene	17 Armoured Infantry Battalion	1941		Established in 1941.
Infantry Arm (Line infantry)
Regiment Infanterie Johan Willem Friso	44 Armoured Infantry Battalion	1813		Former 1st and 9th Infantry Regiment, established in 1813.
Regiment Infanterie Oranje Gelderland	45 Armoured Infantry Battalion	1813		Former 5th and 8th Infantry Regiment, established in 1813.
Regiment Limburgse Jagers	42 Armoured Infantry Battalion	1813		Former 2nd, 6th and 11th Infantry Regiment, established in 1813.
Regiment Van Heutsz	12 Infantry Battalion	1832		Maintains traditions of the disbanded Royal Netherlands East Indies Army and the Netherlands Detachment United Nations which fought in the Korean War, established in 1832 although origins date back to 1814.
Korps Nationale Reserve	• 10 Infantry Battalion • 20 Infantry Battalion • 30 Infantry Battalion	1914		Maintains traditions of the Volunteer Landstorm, established in 1914.
Korps Commandotroepen	Korps Commandotroepen	1942		Successor to No. 2 (Dutch) Troop and Korps Speciale Troepen, established in 1942.
Regiment Stoottroepen Prins Bernhard	13 Infantry Battalion	1944		Established in 1944 by amalgation of several resistance groups.
Regiment Infanterie Menno van Coehoorn	Disbanded	1950		Former 3rd Infantry Regiment, disbanded in 1997.
Regiment Infanterie Chassé	Disbanded	1950		Former 7th and 10th Infantry Regiment, disbanded in 1995.
Cavalry Arm
Regiment Huzaren Van Boreel	• 11 Brigade Reconnaissance Squadron • 42 Brigade Reconnaissance Squadron • 43 Brigade Reconnaissance Squadron • 104 JISTARC Reconnaissance Squadron	1813		Former 4th Hussars Regiment. Established in 1813 while its origins date back to 1585. – Reconnaissance/ISTAR
Regiment Huzaren Prins Alexander	Disbanded	1950		Former 3rd Hussar Regiment, the regiment was disbanded in November 2007. The maintenance of regimental traditions was transferred to the Regiment Huzaren van Boreel. The regiment was permanently disbanded by royal decree on 2 June 2016.
Regiment Huzaren Van Sytzama	Disbanded	1951		Former 1st Hussar Regiment, disbanded in May 2011. The maintenance of regimental traditions was transferred to the Regiment Huzaren van Boreel. The regiment was formally re-established by royal decree on 2 June 2016. Disbanded 2020.
Regiment Huzaren Prins van Oranje	Disbanded	1979		Former 2nd Hussar Regiment, disbanded in September 2012. The maintenance of regimental traditions was transferred to the Regiment Huzaren van Boreel. The regiment was formally re-established by royal decree on 2 June 2016. Disbanded 2020
Regiment Huzaren Prinses Catharina-Amalia	4th Tank Company, 414 Tank Battalion	2020		The regiment was formally established by royal decree on 20 November 2020. At the same time Regiment Huzaren Prins Alexander, Regiment Huzaren Van Sytzama and Regiment Huzaren Prins van Oranje have been disbanded.
Artillery Arm
Korps Veldartillerie	• A Battery of 41 Artillery Battalion • B Battery of 41 Artillery Battalion • D Battery of 41 Artillery Battalion	1677		Field artillery corps, established in 1677. Currently operates PzH 2000NL self-propelled howitzers.
Korps Rijdende Artillerie	• Staff Battery of 41 Artillery Battalion • C Battery of 41 Artillery Battalion	1793		Horse artillery corps, established in 1793. Currently operates 120mm Rayé Tracté heavy mortars.
Korps Luchtdoelartillerie	13th Air Defense Battery	1917		Air defence artillery corps, established in 1917. Currently operates NASAMS 2 medium range surface-to-air missiles, Fennek Stinger Weapon Platforms, and TRML systems.
Engineer Arm
Regiment Genietroepen	• 11 Engineer Company • 41 Armoured Engineer Battalion • 11 Armoured Engineer Battalion • 101 Engineer Battalion	1748		Established in 1748.
Signals Arm
Regiment Verbindingstroepen	• Command & Control Support Command • 102 Electronic Warfare Company	1874		Established in 1874.
Information Manoeuvre Arm
Korps Inlichtingen & Veiligheid Prinses Alexia	• Joint ISTAR Command • Defense Intelligence and Security Institute	2020		Established in 2020. Successor of 101 MI Coy (est. 1954).
Korps Communicatie & Engagement Prinses Ariane	• 1 CMI Command	2020		Established in 2020.

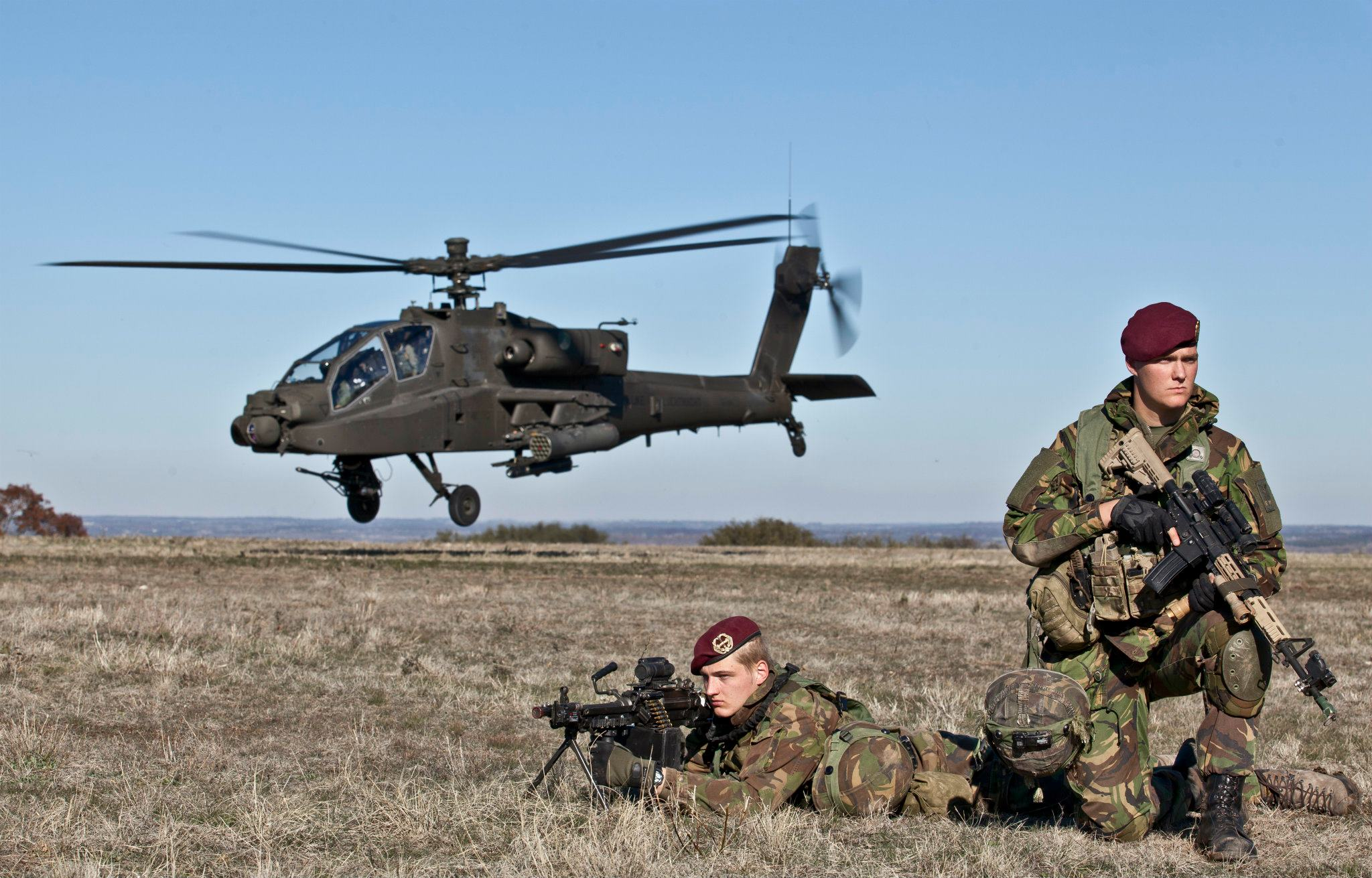
Soldiers of 13 Infantry Battalion Regiment Stoottroepen Prins Bernhard and a Royal Netherlands Air Force AH-64D Apache during an exercise.

==== Infantry ====
Each infantry regiment of the Royal Netherlands Army consists of a single battalion. The current order of battle includes a total of seven infantry battalions – of these, two are classed as foot guards and the remainder as line infantry.

The staff support companies of 11 Airmobile Brigade, 13 Light Brigade and 43 Mechanised Brigade are part of the Garderegiment Grenadiers en Jagers, the Garderegiment Fusiliers Prinses Irene and Regiment Infanterie Johan Willem Friso, respectively.

==== Cavalry ====
The cavalry arm currently consists of two active regiments – the Regiment Huzaren van Boreel and the Regiment Huzaren Prinses Catharina-Amalia (having dress uniforms based on the tradition of the hussars). One has responsibility for the army's active reconnaissance units, while the other has been formed as the parent regiment for units equipped with main battle tanks (MBTs).

Prior to 2012, the army also included full armoured regiments equipped with MBTs. One of these, the Regiment Huzaren Prins Alexander, was disbanded in 2007 due to budget cuts. The other two, the Regiment Huzaren Van Sytzama (former 1st Hussar Regiment) and the Regiment Huzaren Prins van Oranje (former 2nd Hussar Regiment) were disbanded, along with the army's full armoured capability, in 2012 as a result of further cuts to the Dutch defence budget.

In 2016, a German armoured unit, 414 Panzer Battalion, was attached to the Dutch 43 Mechanised Brigade, at the same time becoming a combined German-Dutch unit, with one of the three tank companies and part of the staff and support companies manned with Dutch troops.

=== Services ===
The services (Dienstvakken) consist of the logistical service, which comprises four regiments, and four stand-alone support services. The Royal Netherlands Army consists of the following services and regiments:

Regiment	Unit	Year	Insignia	Notes
Logistical Service
Korps Militaire Administratie	Military Administration Corps	1795		Established in 1795.
Regiment Geneeskundige Troepen	• 400 Medical Battalion • 11 Medical Company • 13 Medical Company • 43 Medical Company	1869		Established in 1869.
Regiment Bevoorradings- en Transporttroepen	• Supply and Transport Command • 11 Supply Company	1905		Established in 1905.
Regiment Technische Troepen	• 11 Maintenance Company • 13 Maintenance Company • 43 Maintenance Company • Land Materiel Logistic Command	1941		Technical troops, established in 1941.
Other Services
Dienstvak Technische Staf	• 11 Maintenance Company • 13 Maintenance Company • 43 Maintenance Company • Land Materiel Logistic Command	1954		Academically educated technical engineers, all officers. Focused on acquiring new equipment and performing technical research, established in 1954.
Dienstvak Militair Juridische Dienst	Military Legal Service	1949		Established in 1949.
Dienstvak Militair Psychologische en Sociologische Dienst	Psychological and Sociological Service	1973		Established in 1973.
Dienstvak van de Lichamelijke Oefening en Sport	Physical Education and Sports Organisation	2004		Established in 2004.

== Uniforms ==
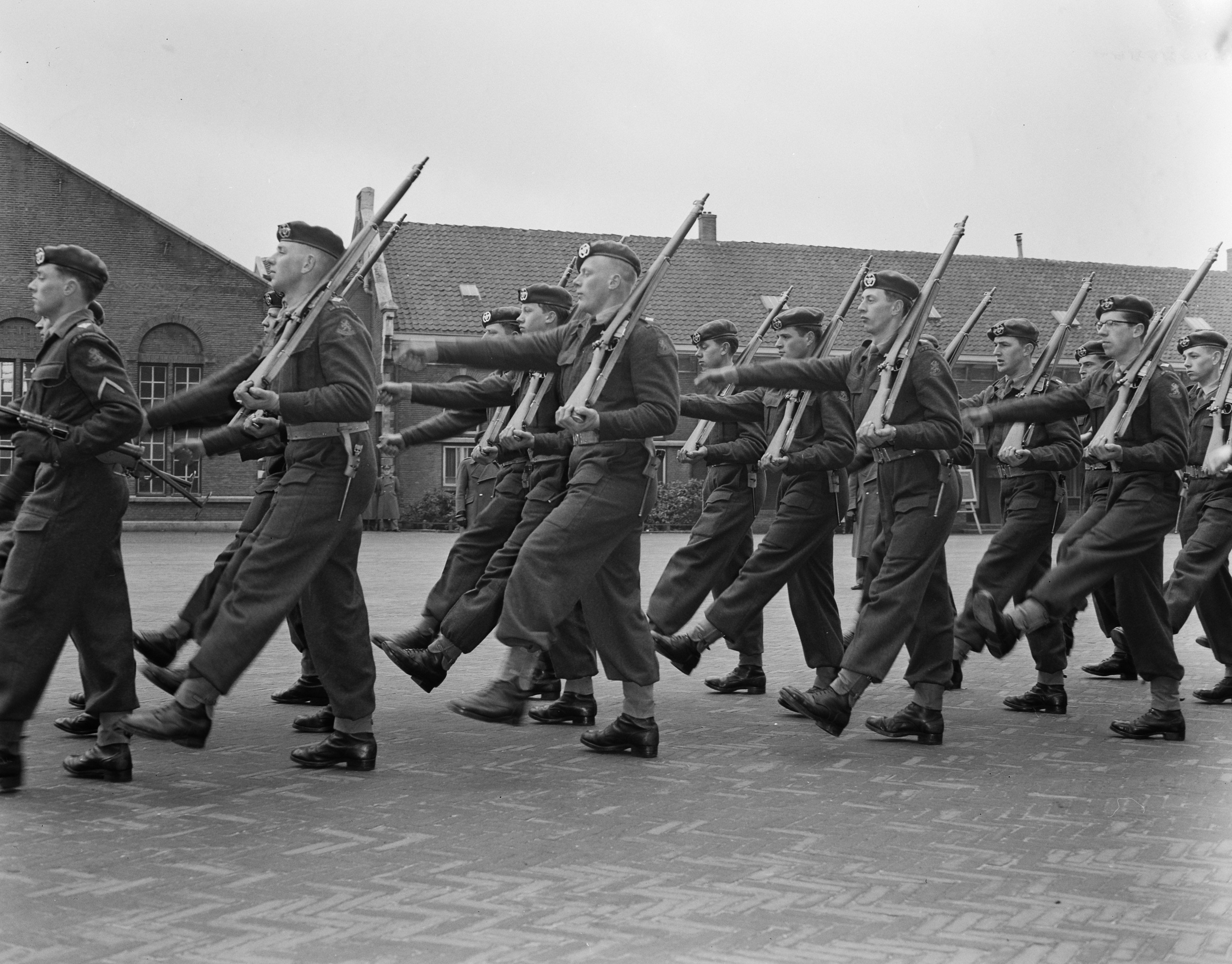
Dutch soldiers in 1956

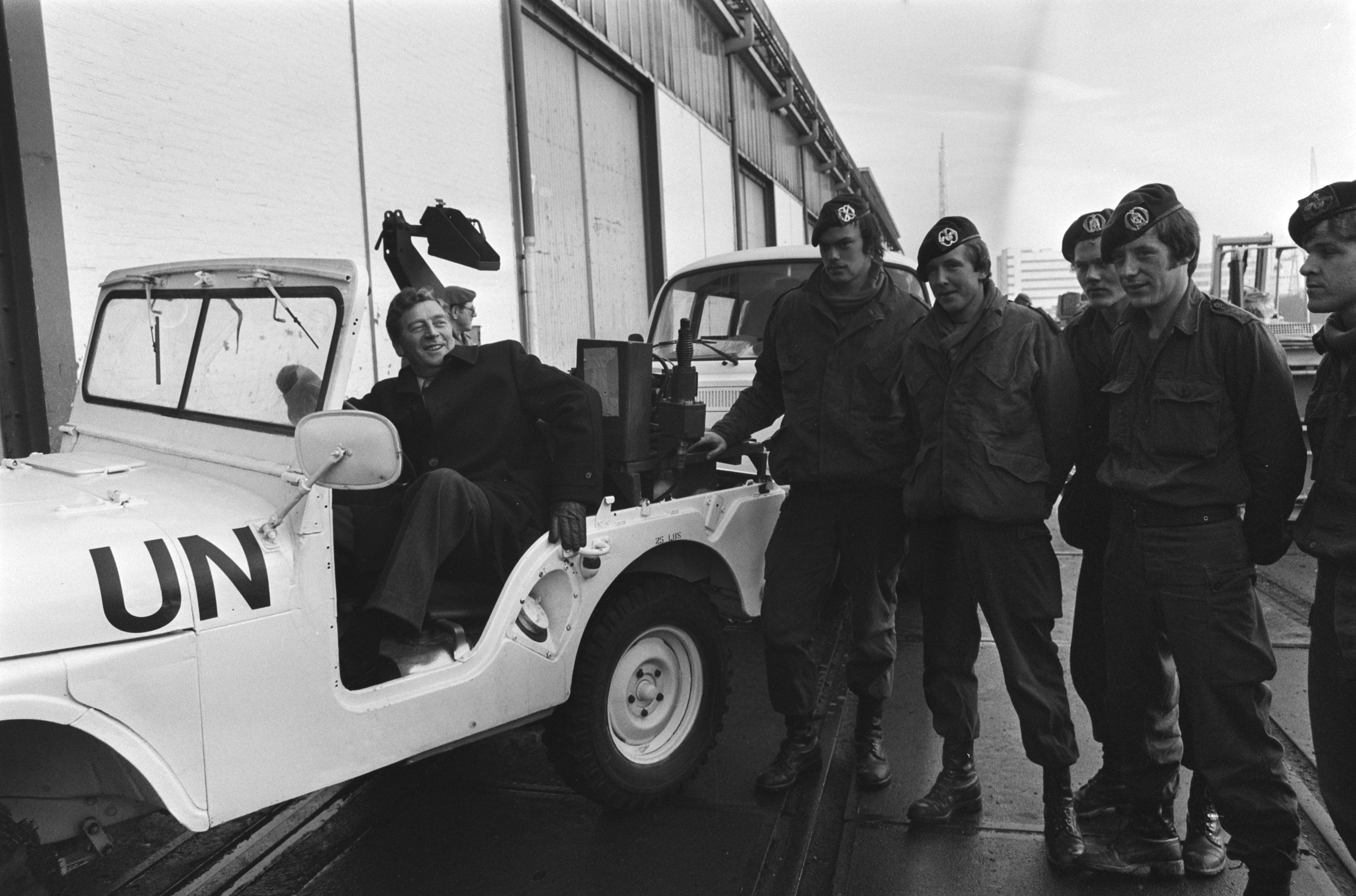
Dutch troops serving with UNIFIL in Lebanon in 1979

The Royal Netherlands Army uniform has multiple categories, ranging from ceremonial uniforms to combat dress to evening wear. In addition, the (special) service dress uniform and mess dress uniform can both be worn in a tropics colourway.

There are four main uniform categories:

Combat uniform

The combat uniform (Gevechtstenue, GVT) is the day-to-day combat uniform, known as Gevechtstenue (GVT M93) and consists of a Disruptive Pattern Material (DPM) jacket and trousers with additional items such as thermals and waterproofs that can be worn underneath. Army combat uniforms are fitted with a distinctive unit insignia on the right arm, while the Dutch flag and the wearer's regiment or corps are worn on the left arm. To optimise the effectiveness of the uniform, multiple camouflage patterns are in use:

- Woodland: Further developed version of the British Disruptive Pattern Material (DPM) camouflage pattern. Optimised for use in wooded terrain in Western Europe and the standard pattern for personnel in the Netherlands.
- Desert: Increasing amount of deployments in desert like environments, such as Iraq and Afghanistan, lead to the implementation of the Desert combat uniform. The desert combat uniform uses the regular combat uniform, while using the American Desert Camouflage Pattern.
- Jungle: The jungle combat uniform utilises the regular combat uniform, in a five-coloured camouflage pattern which is optimised for deployments in tropical environments. The jungle uniform is often used by personnel undergoing jungle training, and units stationed in the Dutch Caribbean.
- MultiCam: Since the regular combat uniform no longer always qualifies for contemporary operations, personnel deploying to foreign countries is provided with interim combat uniforms in the MultiCam camouflage pattern. In addition, the Korps Commandotroepen has implemented uniforms in MultiCam as their standard uniform since 2017. Regular units use the interim uniforms until combat clothing in the newly developed Netherlands Fractal Pattern is distributed, between 2020 and 2022.

Service dress uniform

The service dress uniform (Dagelijks tenue, DT) is used for everyday office, barracks and non-field duty purposes. The uniform was designed by the famous couturier Frans Molenaar and entered service in 2000. It consists of trousers, a jacket, dress shirt, neck tie and headgear (beret, peaked cap or side cap), in a gray-green fabric. The special dress uniform (Gelegenheidstenue, GLT) is worn for certain formal occasions. It consists of the garments of the service dress uniform, differing by the white dress shirt, black neck tie, white gloves, decorations worn in Prussian arrangement, while officers wear an orange sash around the waist.

Mess dress uniform

The mess dress uniform (Avondtenue, AT) is worn during formal occasions, such as a dinner or a ball and consists of a black smoking, complemented with a peaked cap and miniature medals.

Full dress uniform

Each regiment and corps within the army has its own full dress uniform (Ceremonieel tenue, CT), which is a traditional uniform that is worn during ceremonies and special occasions.

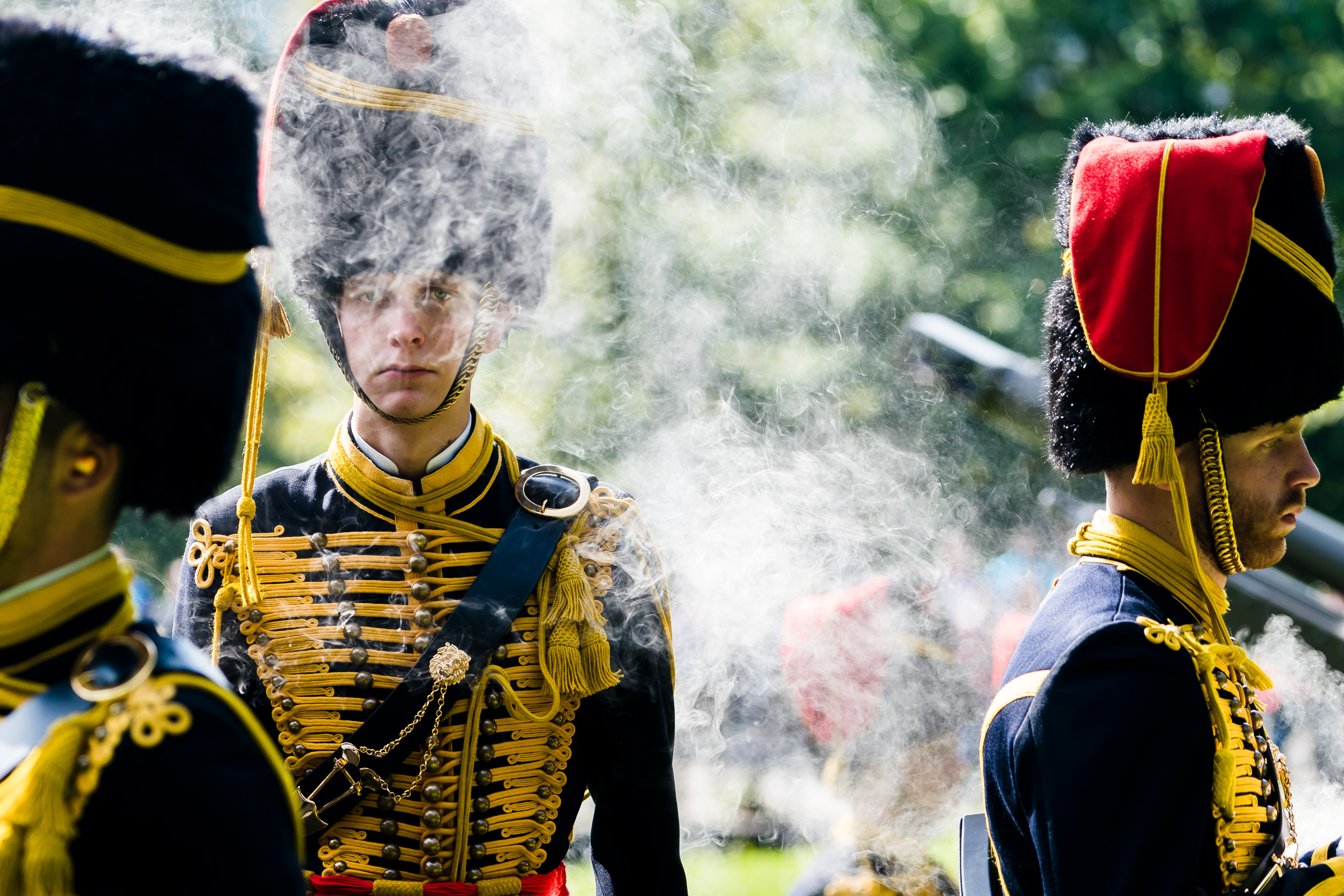
Soldier wearing the Field Artillery Corps ceremonial uniform during the firing of salute shots on Prinsjesdag.

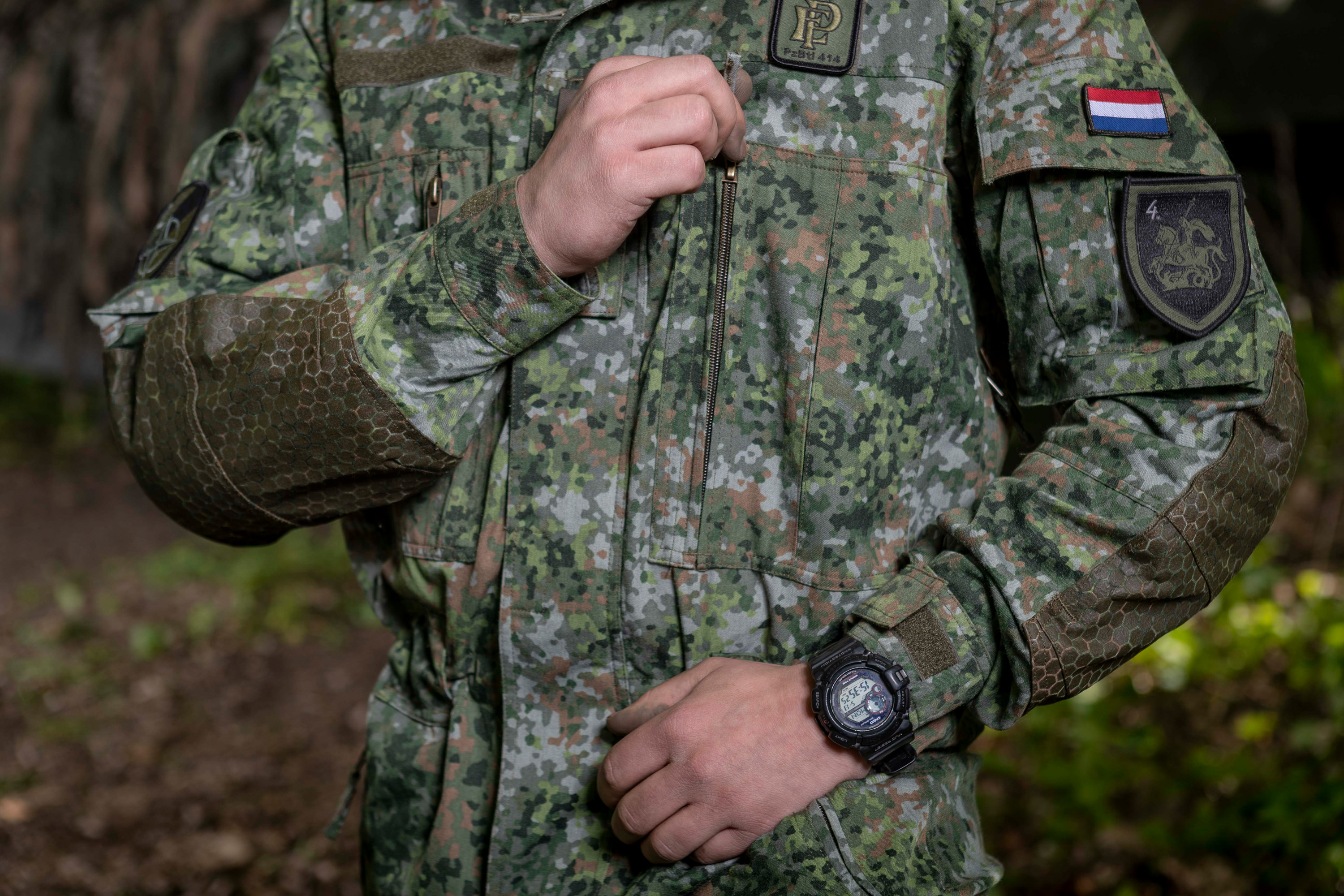
Hussar of 414 Tank Battalion wearing a tank overall in the new Netherlands Fractal Pattern.

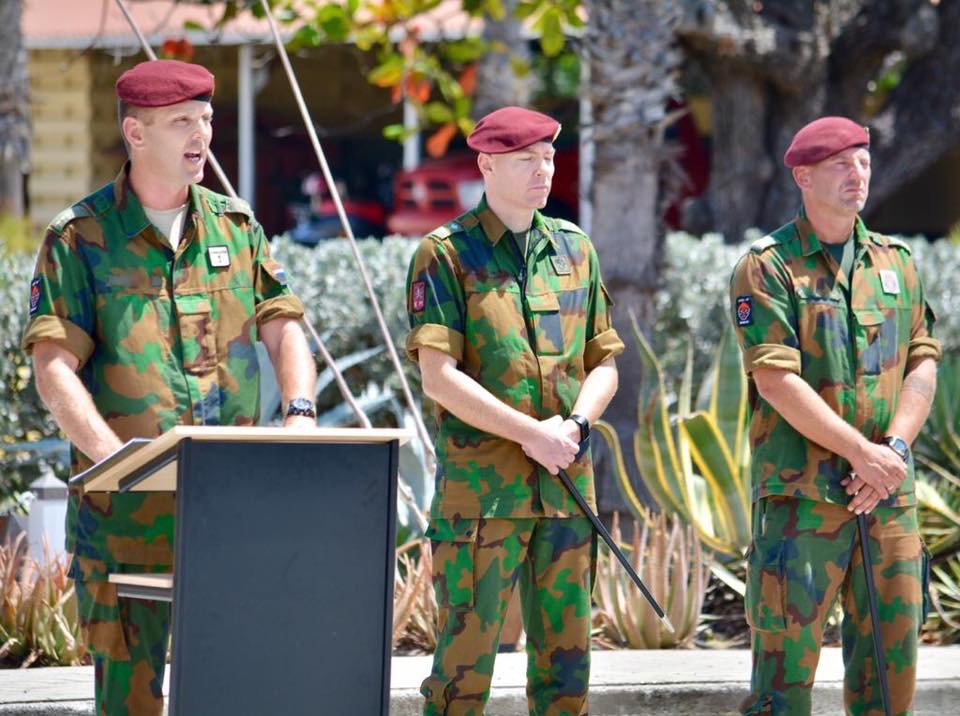
Jungle combat uniform worn by 11 Airmobile Brigade servicemen as part of the contingent in the Dutch Caribbean.

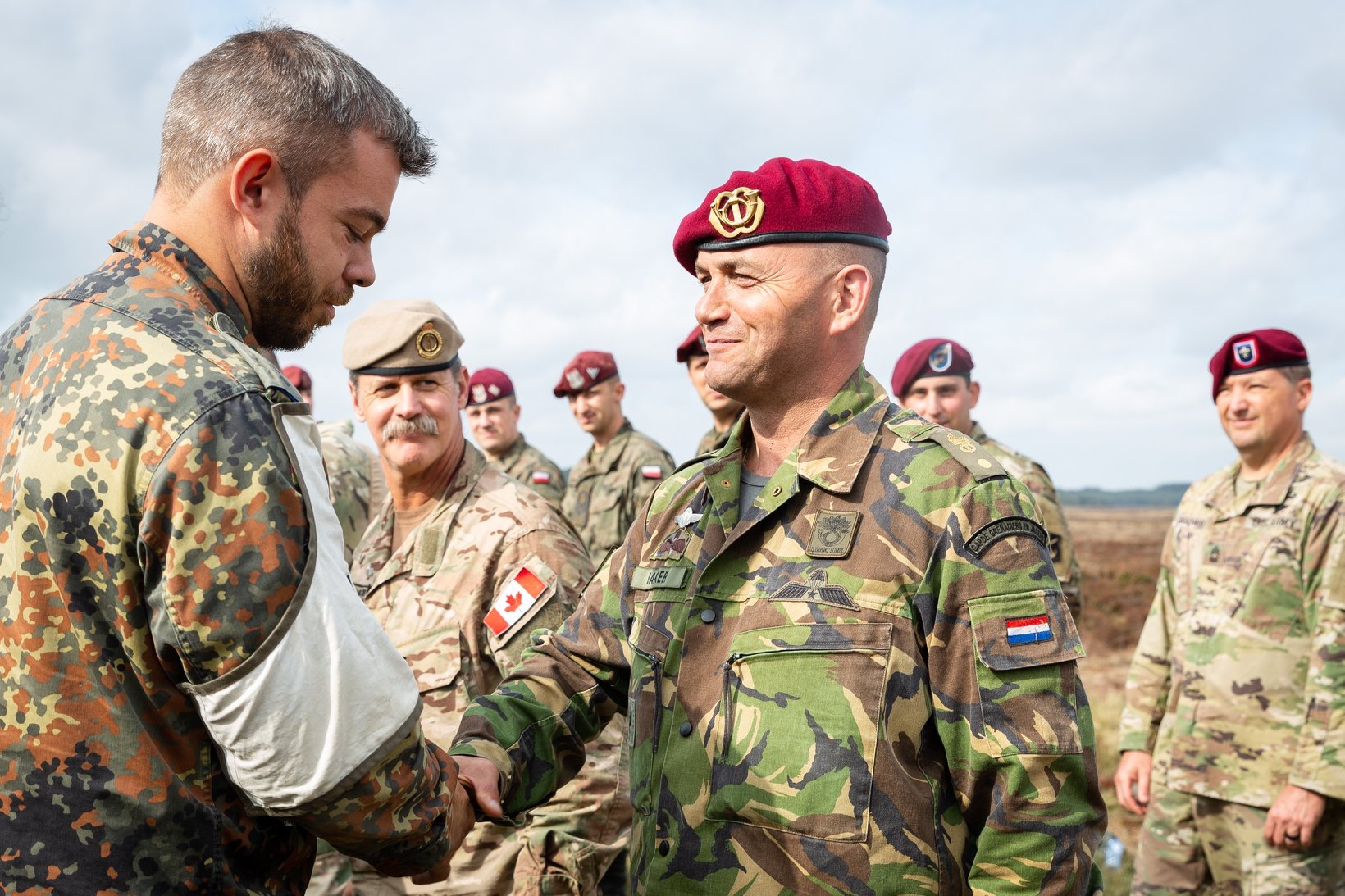
Standard combat uniform in the Disruptive Pattern Material camouflage pattern.

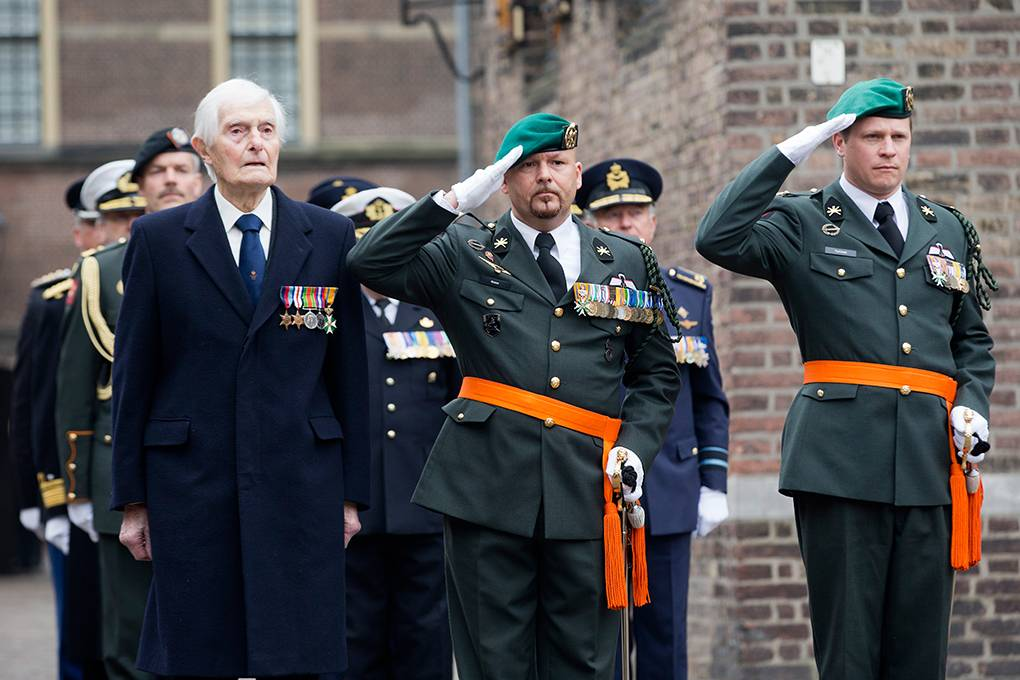
Knights of the Military William Order Kenneth Mayhew, Major Marco Kroon and Lieutenant Colonel Gijs Tuinman, the last both wearing the special dress uniform.

== Military bands ==
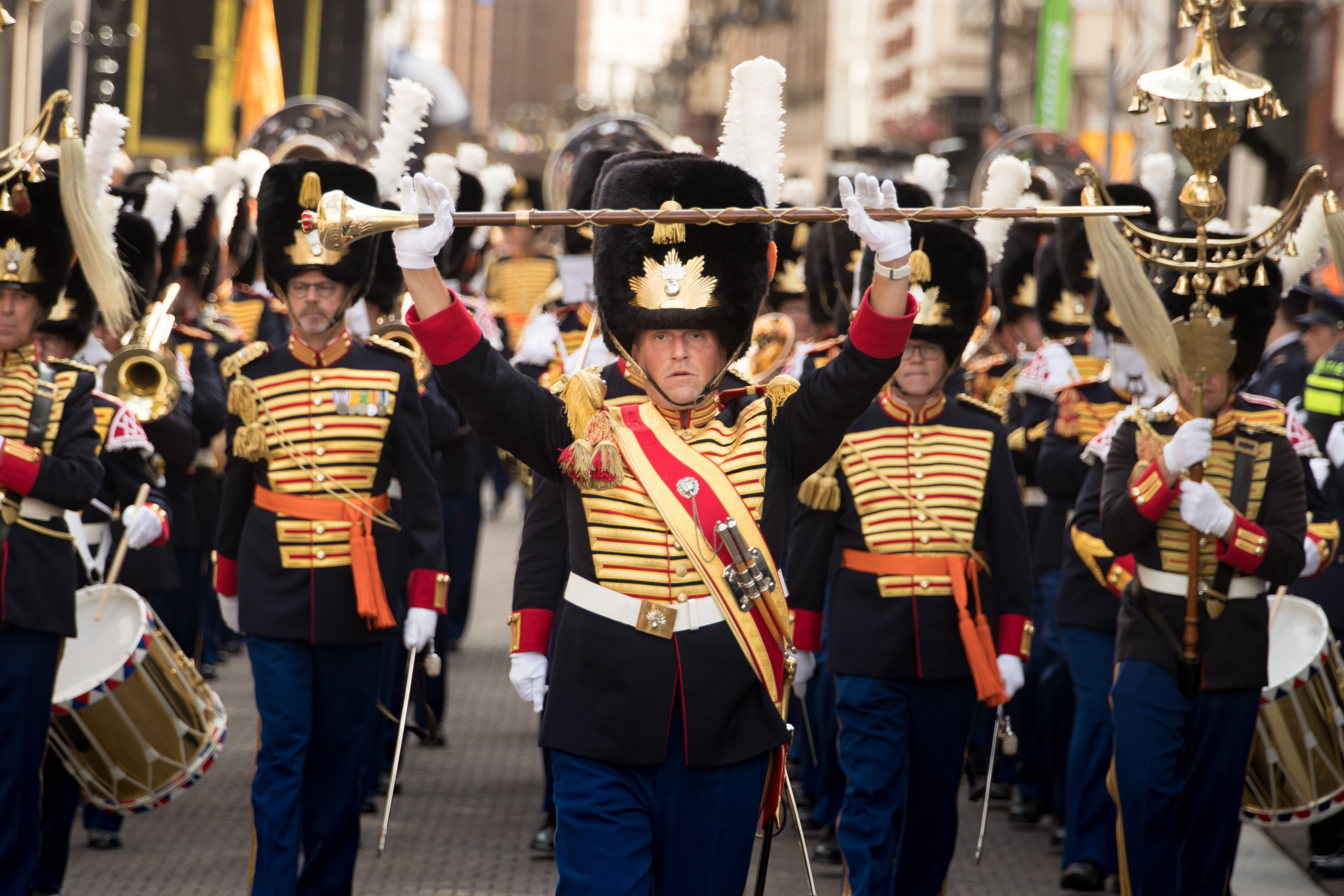
Royal Military Band "Johan Willem Friso" musicians during the annual Prinsjesdag parade in The Hague, 2018.

In past eras, music was used as a means of communication on the battlefield, and today military music retains an important role during military ceremonies such as enlistments and changes of command, and national events such as Prinsjesdag and the annual Remembrance of the Dead ceremony on 4 May. In addition, military bands provide the musical accompaniment during the presentation of letters of credence. Currently, there are four active military bands and fanfare orchestras within the Royal Netherlands Army:

- Royal Military Band "Johan Willem Friso"
- National Reserve Corps Fanfare Brass
- Regimental Fanfare Orchestra of the Grenadiers' and Rifles' Guards
- Fanfare Orchestra "Bereden Wapens" of the RNA Cavalry

== Colours and standards ==
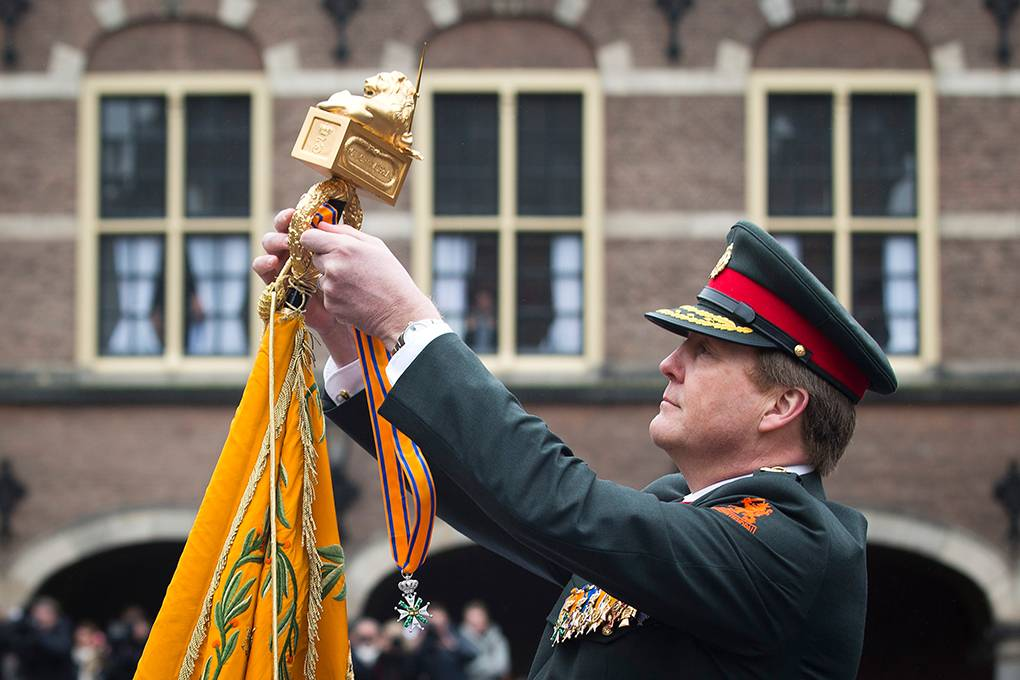
King Willem-Alexander attaching the lanyard of the Military Order of William to the colour of the Korps Commandotroepen in 2016.

All regiments and corps are granted a colour (vaandel) or standard (standaard), including (since 2002) the artillery corps, which at the time was a breach with tradition. The colours and standards form the embodiment of the history and character of the respective regiment or corps. The standards are smaller in size because of a historical reason: horseback units would often struggle with the large sized poles of the regular colours, and therefore chose to wield a shorter version. To this day, the mounted units of the Royal Netherland Army, such as cavalry, field artillery and horse artillery, use the smaller sized standards. The Royal Marechaussee, which used to be a mounted unit of the Royal Netherlands Army, owns a standard as well.

In contrast to the functional use of colours and standards in the past, during which they served as landmarks on the battlefield, their contemporary role has been greatly reduced. Nonetheless, they continue to play an important role during various military ceremonies. For example, soldiers swear the oath of enlistment while holding the respective colour or standard. Moreover, the colours and standards constitute an important connection between military units and the Royal House of the Netherlands. Only the sovereign can grant a military unit a colour or standard, therefore the royal cypher of the monarch that granted the regiment its (original) colour is displayed. In addition, the colours and standards are often inscribed with (historical) battle honours. By prominently displaying them, the aim is to add to the esprit de corps, uphold the collective memory and serve as inspiration for future actions of the respective unit.

== Ranks and insignia ==
The ranks of the Royal Netherlands were established by royal decree of Queen Juliana in 1956. Each regiment and corps has a distinctive cap badge and beret. Many units also call soldiers of different ranks by different names, for example a NATO OR-1 private is called a hussar (huzaar) in cavalry regiments and a cannoneer (kannonier) in artillery units.

=== Commissioned officer ranks ===
The rank insignia of commissioned officers.

NATO code	OF-10	OF-9	OF-8	OF-7	OF-6	OF-5	OF-4	OF-3	OF-2	OF-1
Royal Netherlands Army
Royal Netherlands Army		Generaal	Luitenant-generaal	Generaal-majoor	Brigadegeneraal	Kolonel	Luitenant-kolonel	Majoor	Kapitein/ Ritmeester	Eerste luitenant	Tweede luitenant

=== Other ranks ===
The rank insignia of non-commissioned officers and enlisted personnel.

NATO code	OR-9	OR-8	OR-7	OR-6	OR-5	OR-4	OR-3	OR-2		OR-1
Royal Netherlands Army
Royal Netherlands Army	Adjudant-onderofficier		Sergeant-majoor/ Opperwachtmeester	Sergeant der 1e klasse/ Wachtmeester der 1e klasse	Sergeant/ Wachtmeester	Korporaal der 1e klasse	Korporaal	Soldaat/ Huzaar/ Kanonier der 1e klasse	Soldaat/ Huzaar/ Kanonier der 2e klasse	Soldaat/ Huzaar/ Kanonier der 3e klasse

=== Royal insignia ===
The rank insignia worn by the Monarch of the Netherlands when wearing Royal Netherlands Army uniform.

Holder	Insignia
Koning der Nederlanden

== Equipment ==
=== Infantry ===
The Royal Netherlands Army's basic weapon is the Colt C7NLD or Colt C8NLD assault rifle, produced by Colt Canada (formerly Diemaco). The weapons received an extensive update in 2009: the rifle's black furniture was replaced by dark earth furniture. New parts include a new retracting stock, the Diemaco IUR with RIS rails for mounting flashlights and laser systems, and a vertical foregrip with built-in bipod; the thermold plastic magazines have now become brown in color. The ELCAN sighting system has also disappeared in favour of the Swedish made Aimpoint CompM4 red dot sight. In addition, the weapon can be enhanced further using the Picatinny rail with attachments such as the Heckler & Koch UGL under-barrel grenade launcher. Special operations forces of the Korps Commandotroepen choose to use modified HK416 assault rifles and HK417 designated marksman rifles. The standard secondary weapon across all branches of the Armed forces of the Netherlands is the Austrian-made Glock 17 pistol.

Sniper groups (Schutter Lange Afstand) are equipped with HK417, Accuracy International Arctic Warfare Magnum, its successor Accuracy International AXMC, and Barrett M82 sniper rifles. Support fire is provided by the FN Minimi light machine gun (LMG), the FN MAG general purpose machine gun (GPMG), FN M2 QCB heavy machine gun (HMG) and the H&K GMG automatic grenade launcher, while indirect fire support is provided by M6 60mm or L16 81mm mortars.

=== Armor ===
The army's main battle tank is the Leopard 2A6. These MBTs have been leased from the German army. The Swedish-made CV90 (designated as CV9035NL) is the infantry fighting vehicle of the army, supported on the battlefield by Boxer MRAV armoured fighting vehicles. Reconnaissance units use the light armoured Fennek reconnaissance vehicle.

In early September 2024, the Dutch government announced plans to procure at least 46 Leopard 2A8 main battle tanks, (excl. 6 options) to form a full tank battalion. These tanks are intended to operate alongside the Leopard 2A6 main battle tanks currently leased from Germany. The previous government had expressed interest in acquiring new tanks but was constrained by budgetary limitations. Under the new government, the defence budget has been increased to at least 2% of GDP.

PzH 2000NL of the 41st Artillery Battalion in Lithuania.

=== Artillery and air defence ===
The Fire Support Com (nd l. 6 perates)ery systems: three batteries equipped with Pantserhouwitser 2000NL self-propelled howitzers and one battery equipped with 120mm Rayé Tracté heavy mortars. Air defence is provided by the modernised MIM-104 Patriot long-range air defence system operated by the Joint Ground-based Air Defence Command. Both the PAC-2 surface-to-air missile and PAC-3 anti-ballistic missile are in use. In addition, army personnel operate NASAMS 2 medium-range surface-to-air missiles, Fennek Stinger Weapon Platforms, and Hensoldt TRML-3D radar systems. These systems are operated combinedly in the Army Ground Based Air Defence System (AGBADS).

=== (Protected) mobility ===
For environments that require protection against Small Arms and Light Weapons and improvised explosive devices, the army uses the Bushmaster Protected Mobility Vehicle. The Ministry of Defence has recently placed an order for 1,175 new medium multirole protected vehicles, the Iveco Medium Tactical Vehicle. The newly developed vehicles are due to commence entering service in early 2023. Multiple versions of the Mercedes-Benz Geländewagen are in use across the army, including light armoured combat versions such as the G280 CDI. The Volkswagen Amarok has replaced a large portion of the Mercedes-Benz fleet that was used for day-to-day utility work and peace time operations. Special operations forces (SOF) operate the Dutch-made Defenture VECTOR which is tailor-made for special operations.

=== Engineers and utility ===
Engineer regiments employ several specialist engineering vehicles based on Leopard 1 and Leopard 2 tanks such as the Buffel armoured recovery vehicle, the Leguaan armoured vehicle-launched bridge and the Kodiak combat engineering vehicle. The army employs a variety of (logistical) utility vehicles, including four-, six-, ten- and fifteen-tonne trucks, mainly produced by DAF and Scania. Electronic warfare and CBRN defence units operate the TPz Fuchs armoured personnel carrier. In addition, during operations that require a high degree of mobility, army personnel have access to Luchtmobiel Speciaal Voertuig, KTM motorcycles and Suzuki quads.

=== Unmanned vehicles ===
Multiple types of unmanned aerial vehicles (UAVs) are operational within the army. This includes the Black Hornet Nano, AeroVironment RQ-11B DDL Raven, Boeing Insitu ScanEagle, AeroVironment Wasp III, AeroVironment RQ-20 Puma and Boeing Insitu RQ-21 Blackjack UAVs. It also operates drones produced by local Dutch companies. A large share of UAVs are operated by the 107 Aerial Systems Battery of the Joint ISTAR Command. In addition, the Robotics and Autonomous Systems (RAS) unit of 13 Light Brigade experiments with and operates various unmanned ground vehicles, including the THeMIS produced by Milrem Robotics and the Mission Master of Rheinmetall.

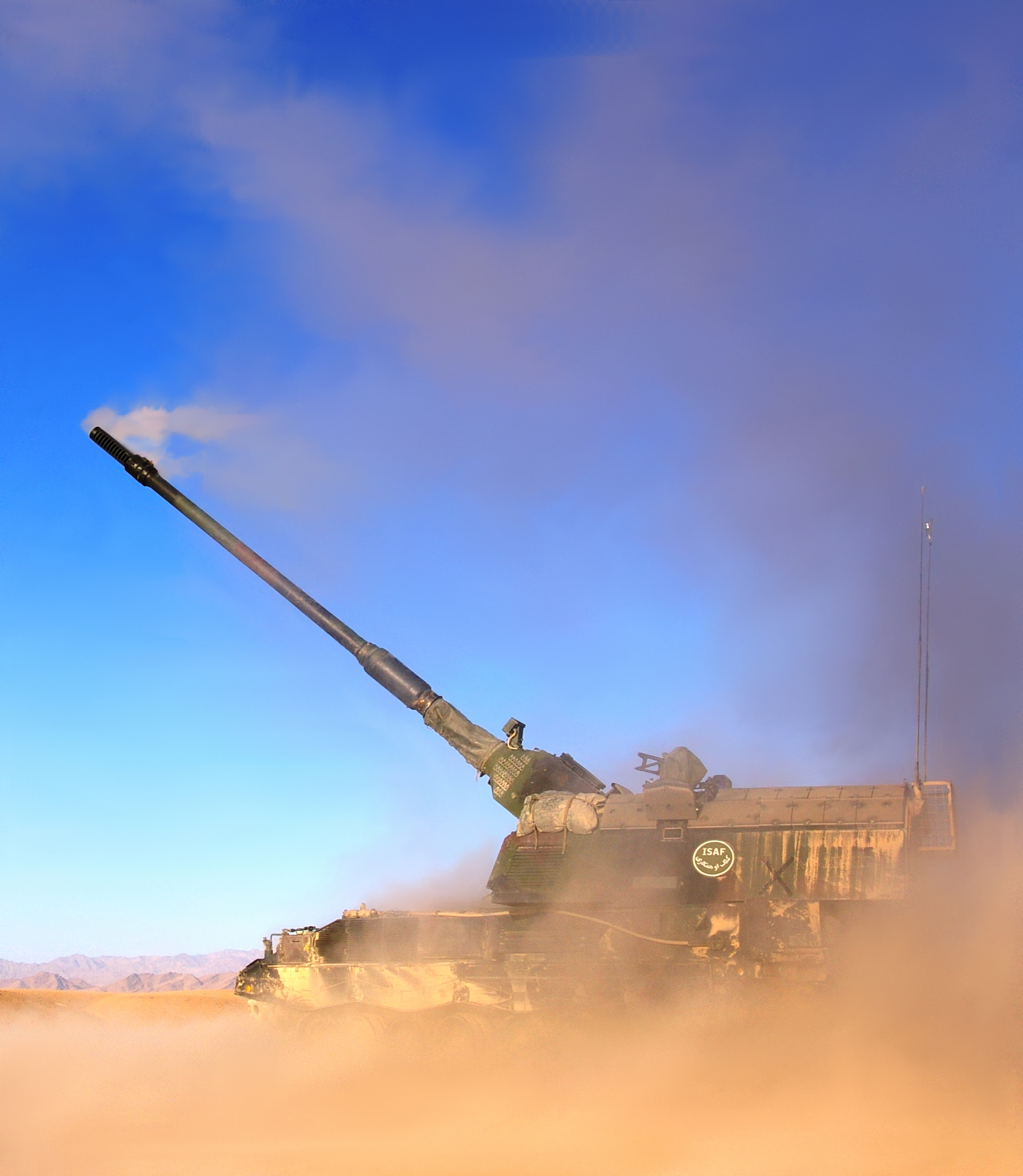
Pantserhouwitser 2000NL

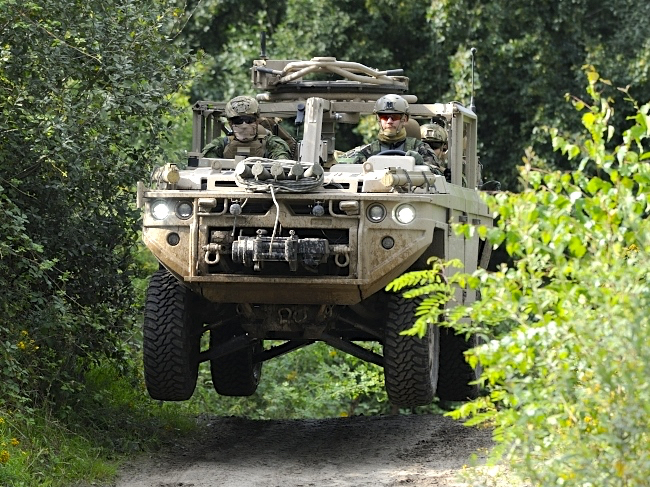
Defenture VECTOR

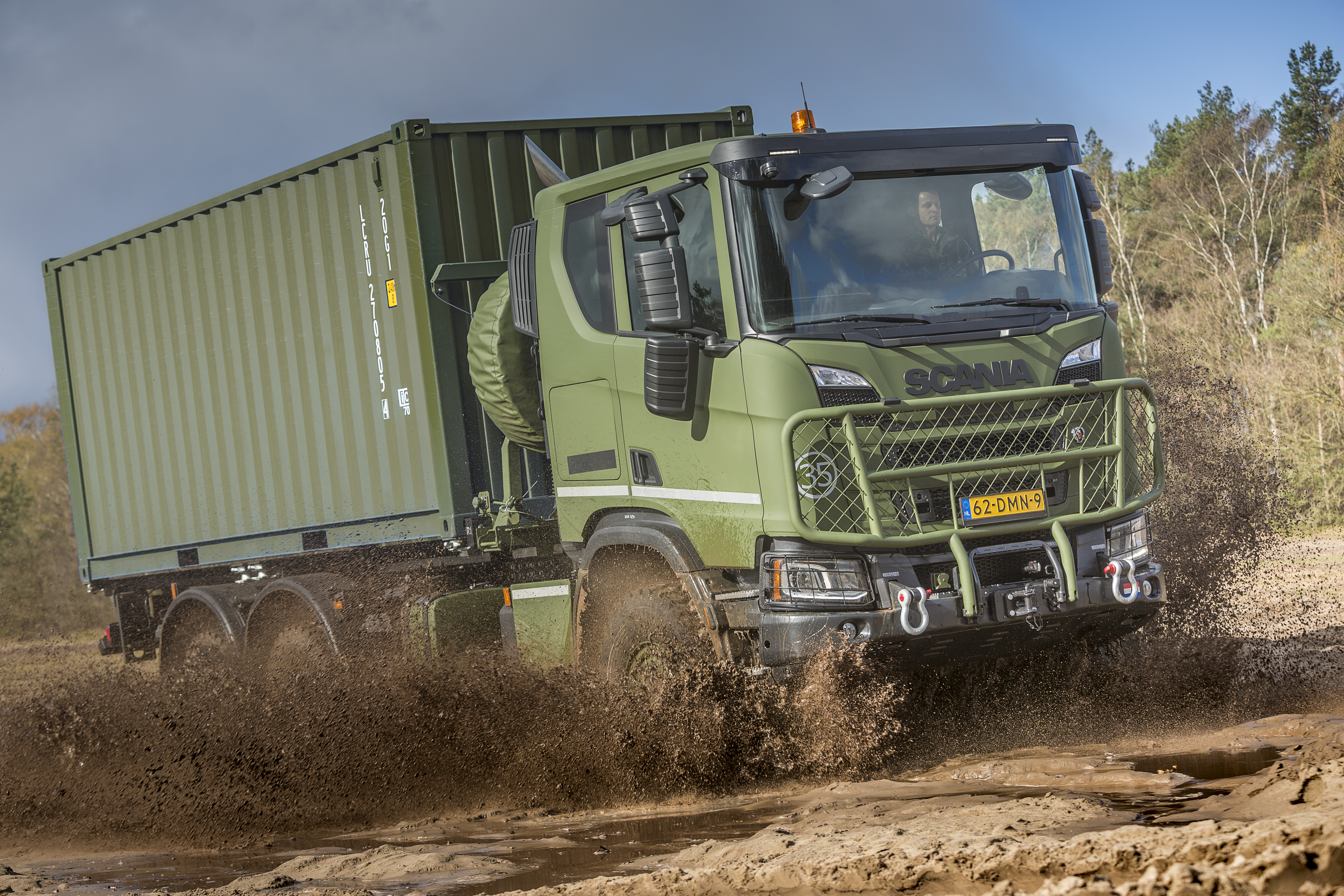
Scania Gryphus

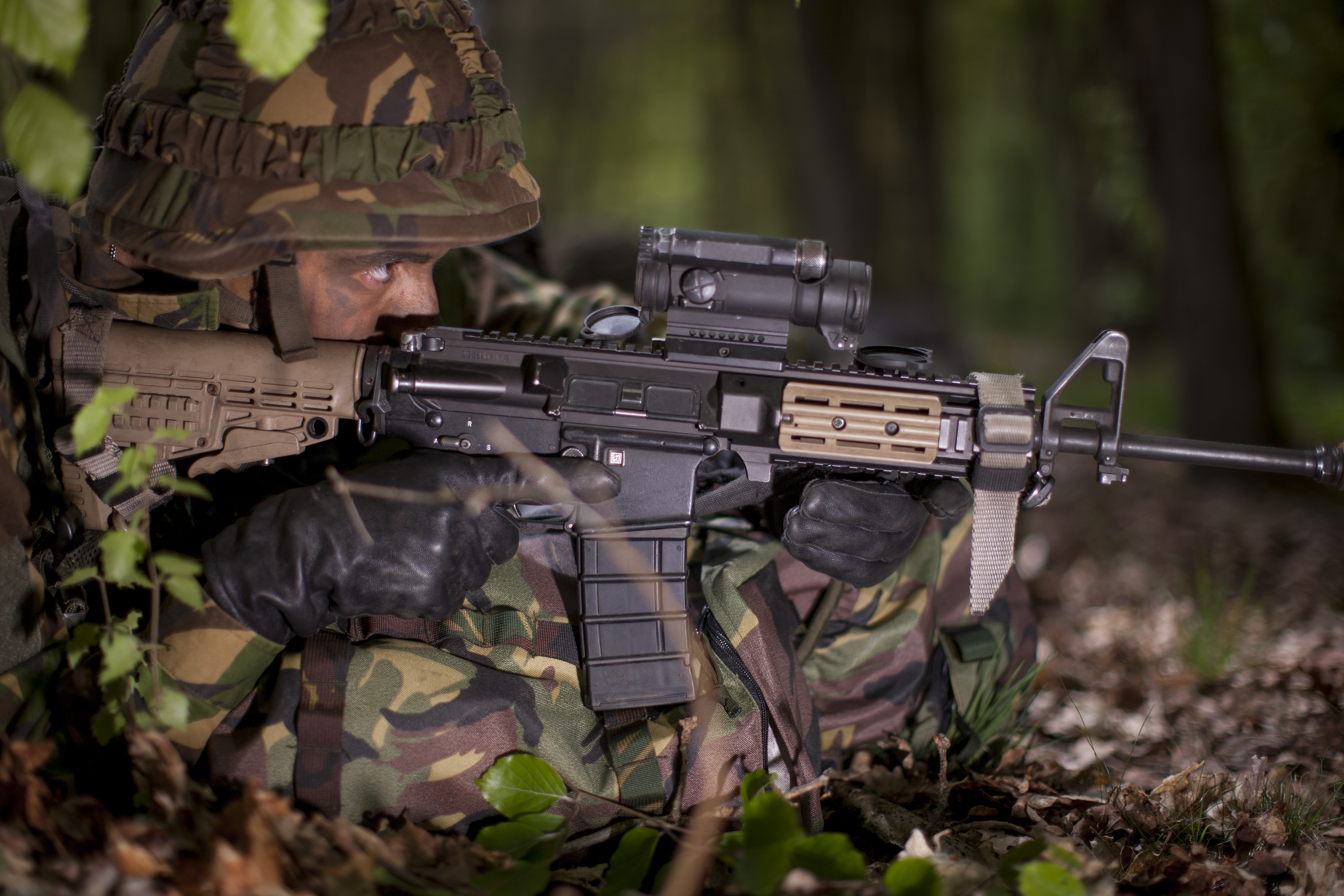
Colt C8NLD

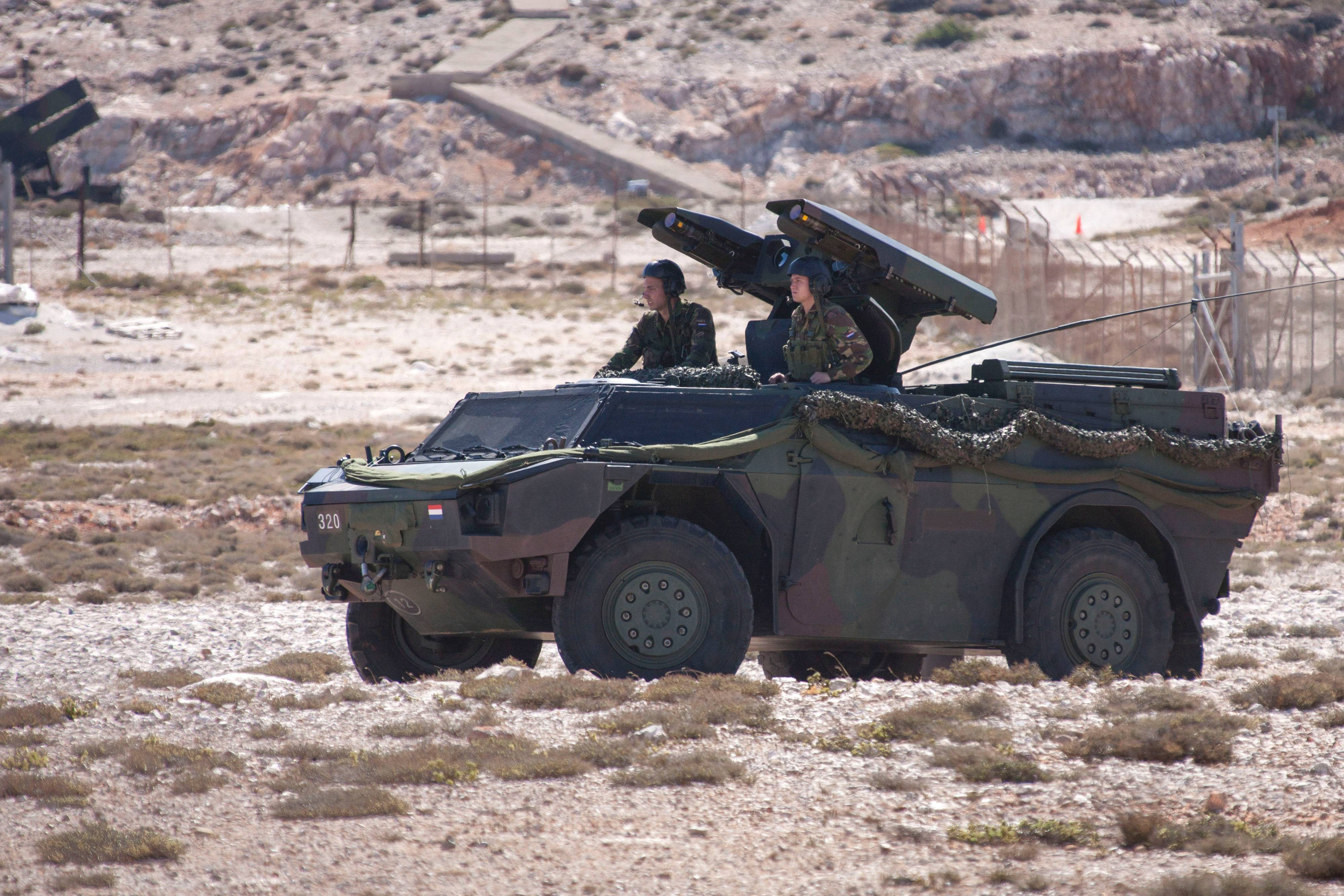
Fennek Stinger Weapon Platform

== See also ==
- Military ranks of the Dutch armed forces
