= National Reserve Korps Fanfare =

Dutch military band

- Fanfare Korps Nationale Reserve
- The band during Prinsjesdag in 2019
- Active: 1986 – present
- Country: Netherlands
- Branch: Royal Netherlands Army
- Type: Military Band
- Size: 50
- Part of: National Reserve Corps
- Headquarters: Bernhard Barracks, Amersfoort

Commanders
- Current commander: Captain Alfred Willering

The National Reserve Korps Fanfare (Dutch: "Fanfare Korps Nationale Reserve") is a military unit in the Royal Netherlands Army that serves as the unit band of the National Reserve Corps. The band's home base is at Bernhard Barracks in Amersfoort. It is one of four military bands in the Netherlands Armed Forces. The conductor of the FKNR is Captain Alfred Willering while the commander is Major Theo van Deelen.

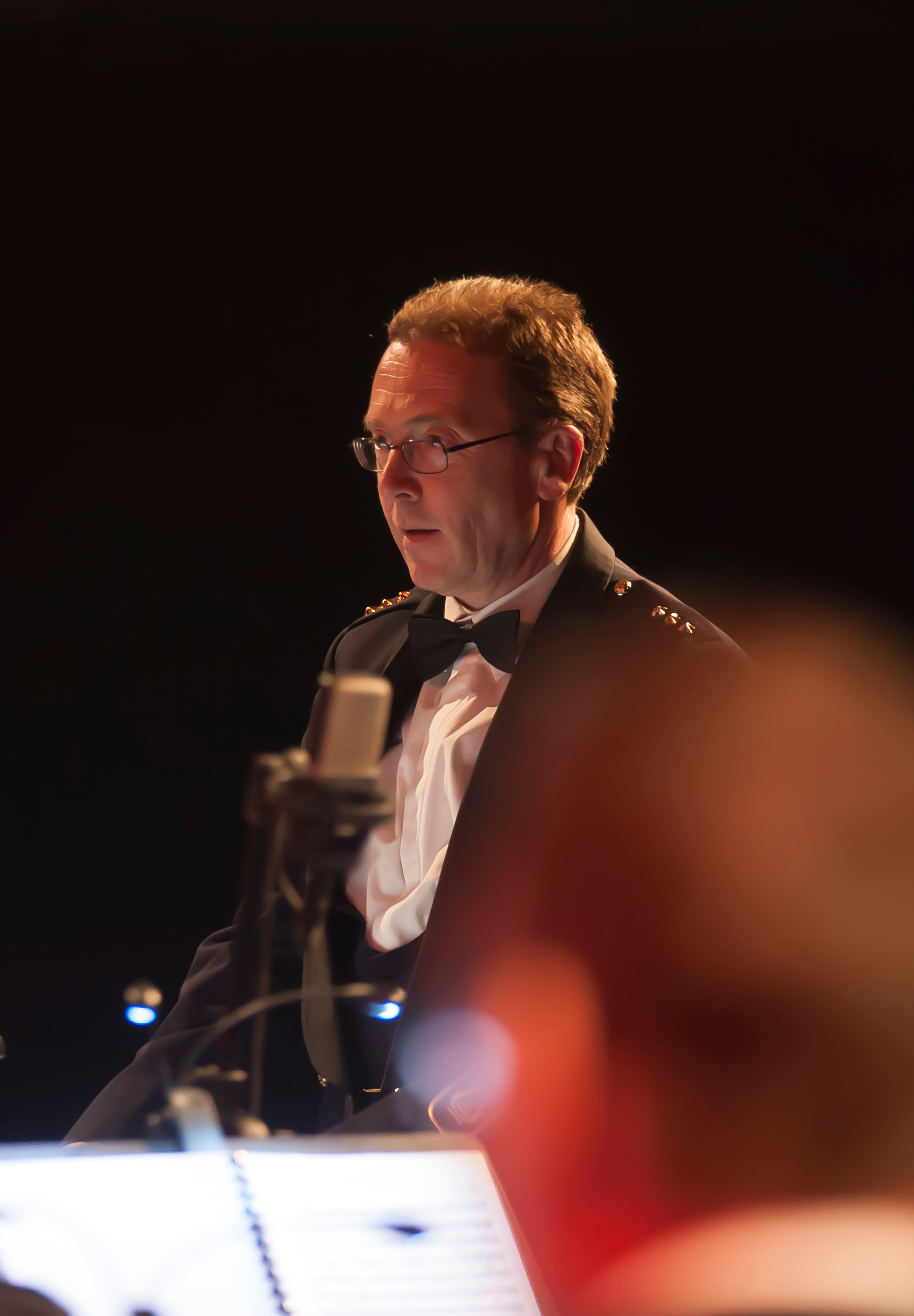
Former director Harrie Wijenberg during a concert at the Theater De Flint in March 2014.

The band was founded in 1986, initially as a drum corps. It was later expanded to become a drum band, after which it eventually became a brass band. A copper ensemble and a combo are also active within the band. On 15 July 1996, a Belgian Air Force C-130H CH-06 crashed at Eindhoven Airport in the Dutch city of Eindhoven after departing from Villafranca in Italy. The aircraft carried 37 members of the FKNR along with two pilots, one engineer and one loadmaster. 32 band members died in the crash. The crash is today known as the Herculesramp (Hercules disaster). It provides musical support for ceremonial events of national importance involving the army reserve and the national government. The FKNR is also present at events such as Prinsjesdag, Veteranendag, Bevrijdingsdag, and Dag van de Strijdkrachten.

== See also ==
- Grenadiers' and Rifles Guard Regiment
- Army Band Hannover
