= Fire Support Command =

- Vuursteun Commando (VustCo)
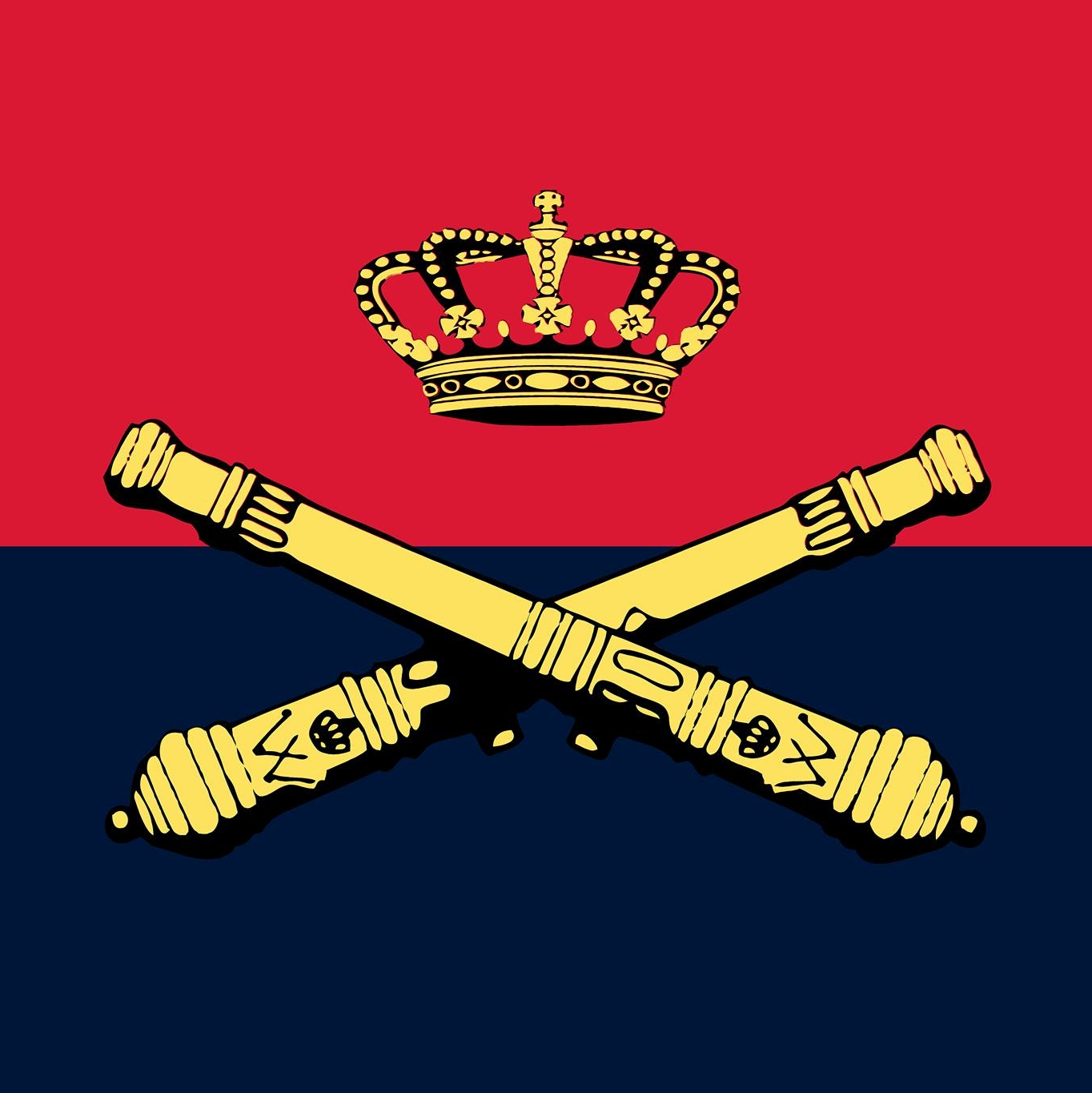
- Emblem of the VustCo
- Founded: 25 January 2013
- Country: Netherlands
- Branch: Royal Netherlands Army
- Type: Artillery
- Size: c. 500 active personnel
- Part of: Operational Support Command Land
- Garrison/HQ: Artillerie Schietkamp in 't Harde

Commanders
- Current commander: Colonel Michel Roelen

The Fire Support Command (Dutch: Vuursteun Commando, VustCo) is the artillery arm of the Royal Netherlands Army. The command consists of 41 Artillery Battalion, a staff, the Fire Support School and the artillery training grounds and is part of the Operational Support Command Land.

The command was established on 25 January 2013 through amalgamation of the 14 Field Artillery Battalion (Dutch: 14e Afdeling Veldartillerie) and the 11 Horse Artillery Battalion (Dutch: 11 Afdeling Rijdende Artillerie).

== Structure ==
With the establishment of 41 Artillery Battalion (Dutch: 41 Afdeling Artillerie) on 18 January 2019, the Royal Netherlands Army has returned to field an independent artillery unit. The battalion staff has since been responsible for planning and operational management of the fire support batteries, a task which used to be the responsibility of the staff of the Fire Support Command. The staff will, however, maintain responsibility over the management of the Fire Support School and the artillery training grounds. Personnel of the command is divided over two corps, the Korps Veldartillerie (Field Artillery Corps) and the Korps Rijdende Artillerie (Horse Artillery Corps), the latter also known as the Gele Rijders (Yellow Riders) due to their traditional uniforms with heavy yellow braiding. The corps serve a traditional purpose and are not indicative of the size of the respective units.

On 30 April 2021, the new Delta (D) Battery of the 41 Artillery Battalion was established as a result of investments into the land-based firepower. The battery has not yet reached full strength, hence the battery was called a "battery minus". Instead of nine Pantserhouwitsers per battery, the Delta Battery fields six.

=== Units ===
The Fire Support Command consists of the following units:

- Fire Support Command (Vuursteun Commando), in 't Harde
  - Staff Fire Support Command (Staf Vuursteun Commando)
    - 11 Horse Artillery Battalion (11 Afdeling Rijdende Artillerie; being formed; will join the 43 Mechanised Brigade in 2025)
    - 41 Field Artillery Battalion (41 Afdeling Veldartillerie; will join the 13 Light Brigade in 2025)
      - Headquarters Battery (Stafbatterij)
      - A and B Battery, each with 9× Panzerhaubitze 2000 self-propelled howitzers
      - C Battery, with 16× MO-120-RT towed mortars (being re-equipped with 9× Panzerhaubitze 2000 and will join 11 Horse Artillery Battalion in 2025; MO-120-RT mortars will be transferred to 11 Air Assault Brigade)
      - D Battery, with 6× Panzerhaubitze 2000 self-propelled howitzers (will receive 3× additional Panzerhaubitze 2000 and join 11 Horse Artillery Battalion in 2025)
  - Artillery Training Grounds (Artillerie Schietkamp)
  - Fire Support School (Vuursteunschool)

Additionally, the command is responsible for the:

- Joint Fires Cells: The Joint Fires Cells (JFCs) coordinate the (simultaneous) requests for, and integration of ground-, air-, and seabased air support. The JFC conduct their operations from command centres, attached to the combat units of the brigades (11 Air Assault Brigade, 13 Light Brigade and 43 Mechanised Brigade), the Korps Commandotroepen and the Netherlands Marine Corps.
- Fire Support Teams: The Fire Support Teams (FSTs) consists of squads in the field, which maintain contact with artillery, air and naval assets in order to guide fire support to the targets.
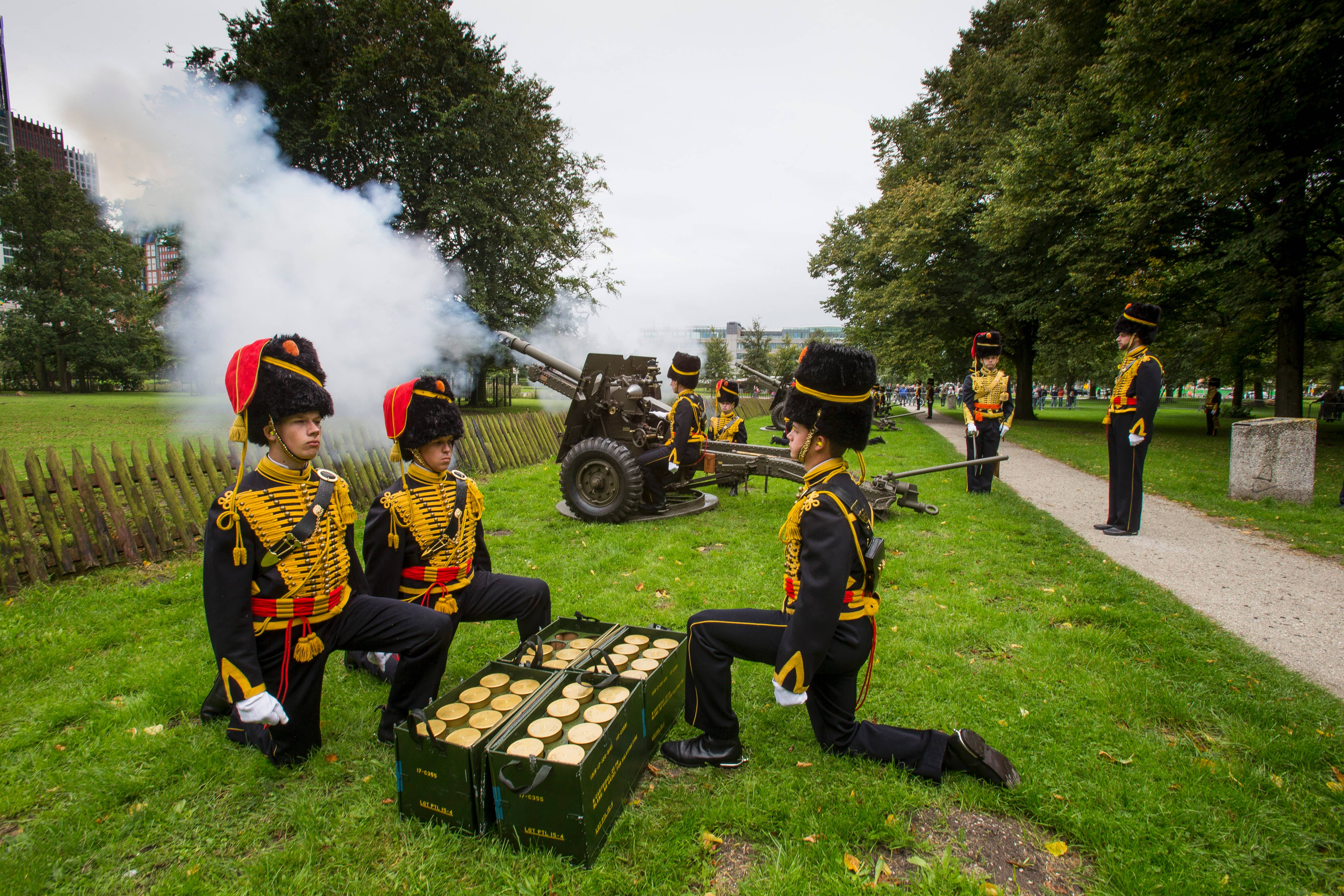
Gele Rijders (Yellow Riders) during the annual gun salute firing ceremony on Prinsjesdag

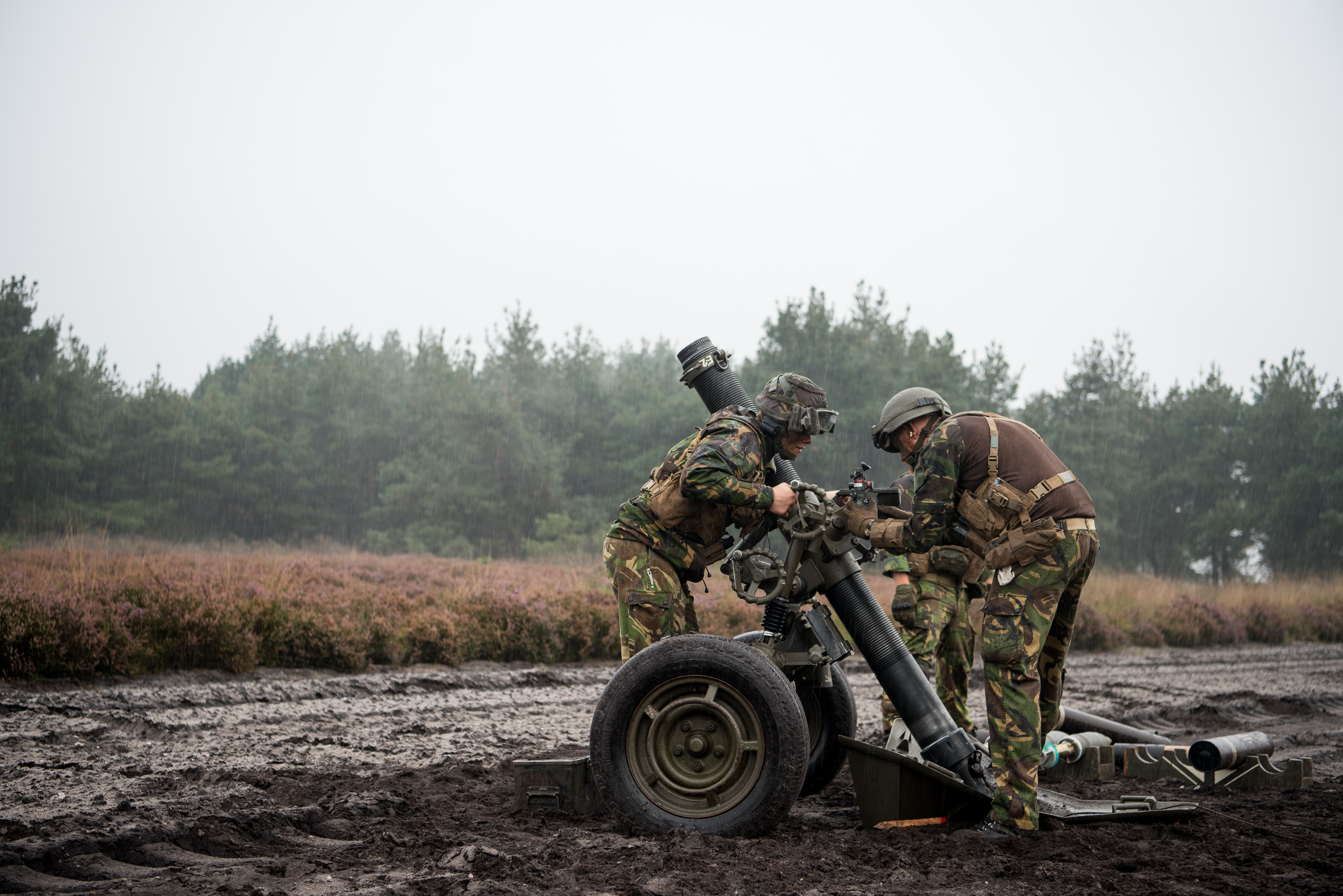
Mortarmen with MO-120 mortars during a joint training with the Defence Helicopter Command, in 2019

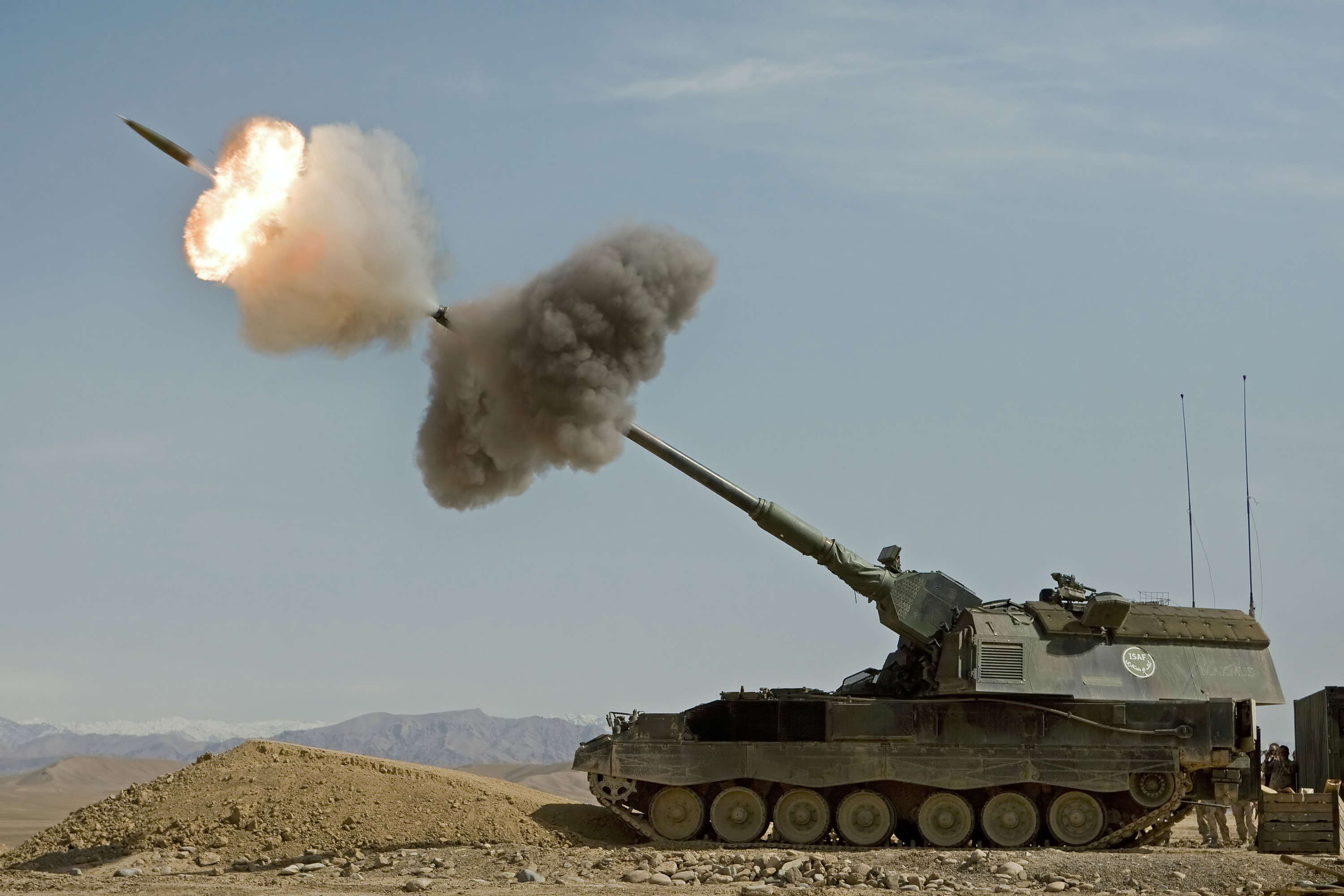
A Dutch howitzer firing in Afghanistan in 2009, as part of Task Force Uruzgan

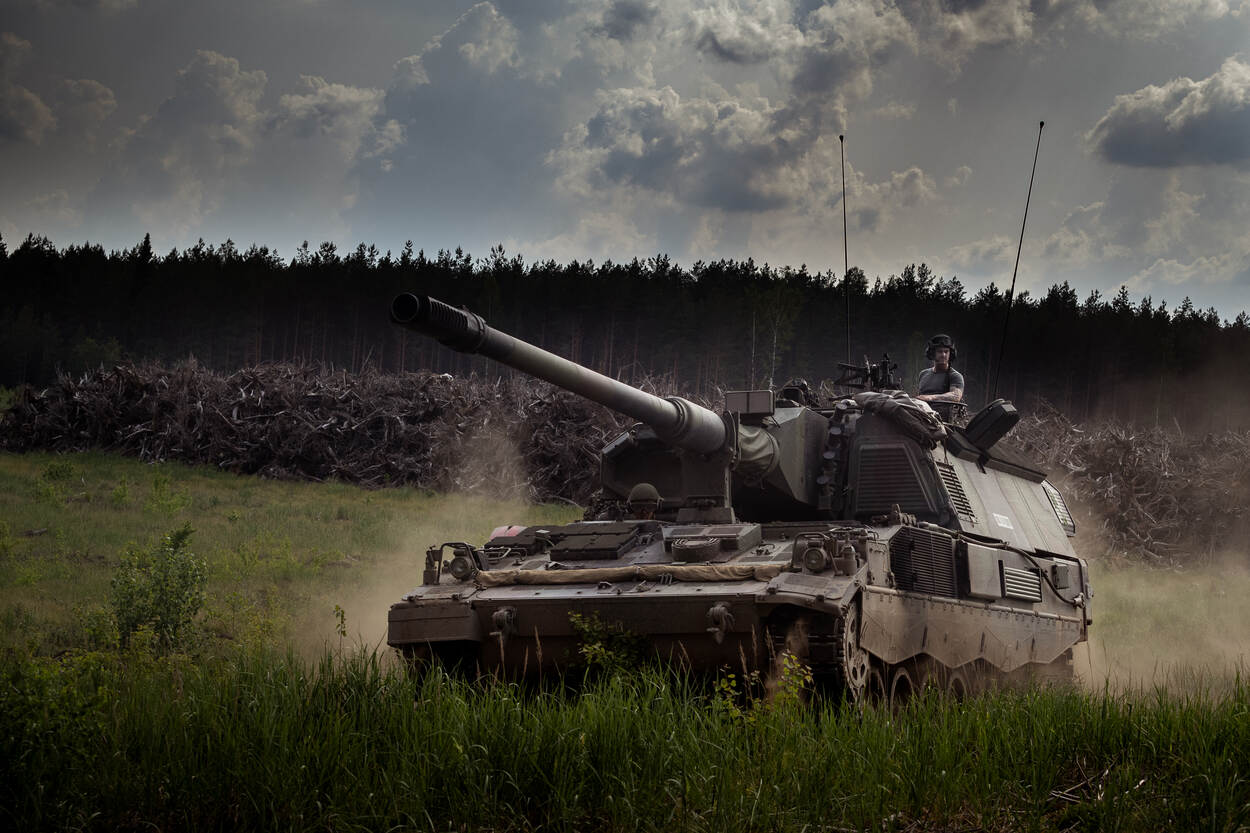
Pzh2000NL of A Battery during exercise Vigilant Wolf in 2020, as part of NATO Enhanced Forward Presence

== Equipment ==
Name	Origin	Type	Number	Photo	Notes
Rocket artillery
PULS	Israel	Multiple rocket launcher	2		20 ordered in 2023. In February 2024 the first PULS multiple rocket launcher arrived in the Netherlands.
Self-propelled howitzers
Pantserhouwitser 2000NL	Germany	Self-propelled howitzer	35 (49)		Capable of firing 155mm Excalibur precision-guided munition since 2018. Mid-life update due between 2026 and 2028.
Mortars
MO-120-RT	France	120 mm mortar	16 (22)		16 mortars operational, due for replacement in 2023 by 20 new 120 mm mortars and four loitering munition launchers.
Armoured fighting vehicles
Boxer	Germany	Armoured fighting vehicle	8		Command Post variant in use for command and control.
Radars
Thales Multi Mission Radar	Netherlands	Mobile radar	6		In use as detection capacity for artillery support. Capable of detecting and tracking incoming missiles, artillery and unmanned aerial systems. Produced by Thales Nederland.
