= Canadian Army Trophy =

NATO tank gunnery competition

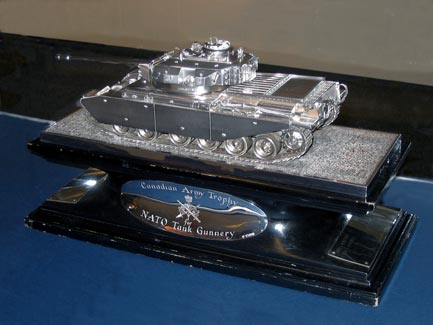
Canadian Army Trophy

The Canadian Army Trophy (CAT) is a tank gunnery competition established to foster excellence, camaraderie and competition among the armoured forces of the NATO countries in Western Europe.

The trophy is a miniature sterling silver replica of a Canadian Army Centurion tank. It is now located at CFB (Canadian Forces Base) Gagetown in New Brunswick, Canada; home of the Canadian Armour School.

== Origins ==
The Canadian Army Trophy (CAT) competition started in 1963 when the Canadian government donated a silver replica of a Centurion tank to the country that obtained the highest score during a tank gunnery competition that was hosted by the Canadian Army 4th Mechanized Brigade forward deployed in West Germany. This tank replica later became known as the Canadian Army Trophy for NATO Tank Gunnery. The competition was established to foster excellence, camaraderie and competition among the armor forces of the NATO countries in Western Europe. The winner of the Canadian Army Trophy, which remains the property of Canada, retains it until the next competition and is responsible for its safe custody. The competition was held annually through 1968; and in 1970 it was decided that it would be held every two years at Bergen-Hohne, West Germany beginning with a competition in 1973; later the competition would also be held at Grafenwöhr. Each member country was invited to field a 'team' (a tank company of four platoons of 3 AFVs) to represent their respective Armies. Nations represented included Canada, Belgium, United Kingdom, the Netherlands, West Germany and the United States.

Since 1963 the competition format has undergone numerous changes. Originally, single tanks fired from fixed points at known ranges. Following the 1968 and again after the 1975 competitions, the rules and procedures of the competition were changed to more accurately reflect combat conditions. The 1970, 1973 and 1975 competitions incorporated tank sections, consisting of two tanks; while beginning in the 1977 competition, 3-tank platoons (or strong sections for 5-tank platoons) are now required to fire and move over a course, termed a "battle run," designed to test their gunnery skills under more realistic conditions. Each battle run consists of firing from stationary positions and while on the move, at both stationary and moving targets. 4-Tank platoons were incorporated beginning with the 1981 competition. The trophy and awards were given to the best scoring team.

After the 1981 competition, additional changes were made to provide better means of achieving the aims of the CAT competition and to reflect the intended nature of the event, namely, a competition among the land forces of the Central Region. Accordingly, the 1983 CAT competition format organized units from the six participating nations (Belgium, Canada, Germany, Netherlands, United Kingdom, and the United States) in teams corresponding to their army group assignments within the Central Region. Units were therefore either members of the Northern Army Group (NORTHAG) or Central Army Group (CENTAG). The Canadian Army Trophy is now presented to the winning Army Group and awards were given to the three best scoring platoons of each Army Group. The winner of the Canadian Army Trophy, which remains the property of Canada, retains it until the next competition and is responsible for its safe custody.

NORTHAG consisted of the British Army of the Rhine (BAOR)'s British I Corps, American 2nd Armored Division (Forward), German I Corps, Netherlands' I Corps, and Belgian I Corps. CENTAG consisted of the German II and III Corps, the American V and VII Corps, and the Canadian 4th Brigade.

The responsibility of organizing and hosting the competition rotated between the different participating nations. In 1981 the responsibility shifted to the two Army Groups, Central Army Group (CENTAG) or Northern Army Group (NORTHAG). When CENTAG hosted the competition, it was held in Grafenwöhr; likewise when NORTHAG hosted, it was in Bergen-Hohne.

The failures of a nation's entrant to place well at the CAT have had considerable defence industry impact. The showing of the UK's Royal Hussars at the 1987 competition was the subject of a front-page story in London's Sunday Telegraph, June 21, 1987, titled "NATO Allies Outgun Britain's New Battle Tanks". However, in battle conditions the British entry went on to be recognised as arguably the world's pre-eminent tank.

=== Winners ===
Year	Team/Squadron/Company	Nation	Tank	Best Platoon or Section	Nation	Tank
1963	4e Lanciers	BEL	M-47 Patton	-	-	-
1964	4e Lanciers	BEL	M-47 Patton	-	-	-
1965	Royal Scots Greys	UK	Centurion Mk.5	-	-	-
1966	13th/18th Royal Hussars (QMO)	UK	Centurion	-	-	-
1967	B Squadron, Lord Strathcona's Horse	CAN	Centurion	-	-	-
1968	1er Lanciers	BEL	M-47 Patton	-	-	-
1970	16th/5th The Queen's Royal Lancers	UK	Chieftain Mk.3	16th/5th The Queen's Royal Lancers	UK	Chieftain Mk.3
1973	3. Kompanie, Panzerbataillon 83	FRG	Leopard 1	Queen's Royal Irish Hussars	UK	Chieftain
1975	3. Kompanie, Panzerbataillon 84	FRG	Leopard 1 A1	3. Kompanie, Panzerbataillon 84	FRG	Leopard 1 A1
1977	Royal Canadian Dragoons	CAN	Leopard 1 A2	B Squadron, 11 Tankbataljon	NLD	Leopard 1
1979	2. Kompanie, Panzerbataillon 284	FRG	Leopard 1 A4	2. Kompanie, Panzerbataillon 284	FRG	Leopard 1 A4
1981	4. Kompanie, Panzerbataillon 294	FRG	Leopard 1 A4	4. Kompanie, Panzerbataillon 294	FRG	Leopard 1 A4
1983	CENTAG (West Germany)	FRG	Leopard 1 A4	1. Zug, 2. Kompanie, Panzerbataillon 293	FRG	Leopard 1 A4
1985	NORTHAG (Netherlands)	NLD	Leopard 2	2. Kompanie, Panzerbataillon 244	FRG	Leopard 2 A1
1987	CENTAG (United States)	USA	M1 Abrams IP	1 Platoon, D Company, 4/8th Cavalry	USA	M1 Abrams IP
1989	NORTHAG (Netherlands)	NLD	Leopard 2 A4	4 Platoon, A Eskadron, 41 Tankbataljon	NLD	Leopard 2 A4
1991	NORTHAG (Germany)	GER	Leopard 2 A4	3. Zug, 4. Kompanie, Panzerbataillon 84	GER	Leopard 2 A4

== CAT '77 ==
The 1977 competition was the first time an American team had participated, C Company 2-81 Armor; but came in last place. The competition was held in Bergen-Hohne, West Germany, 25–29 April 1977. Hosted by United Kingdom. The Royal Canadian Dragoons team that had received its first Leopard tank four months earlier won. It was held on Range 9.

== CAT '79 ==
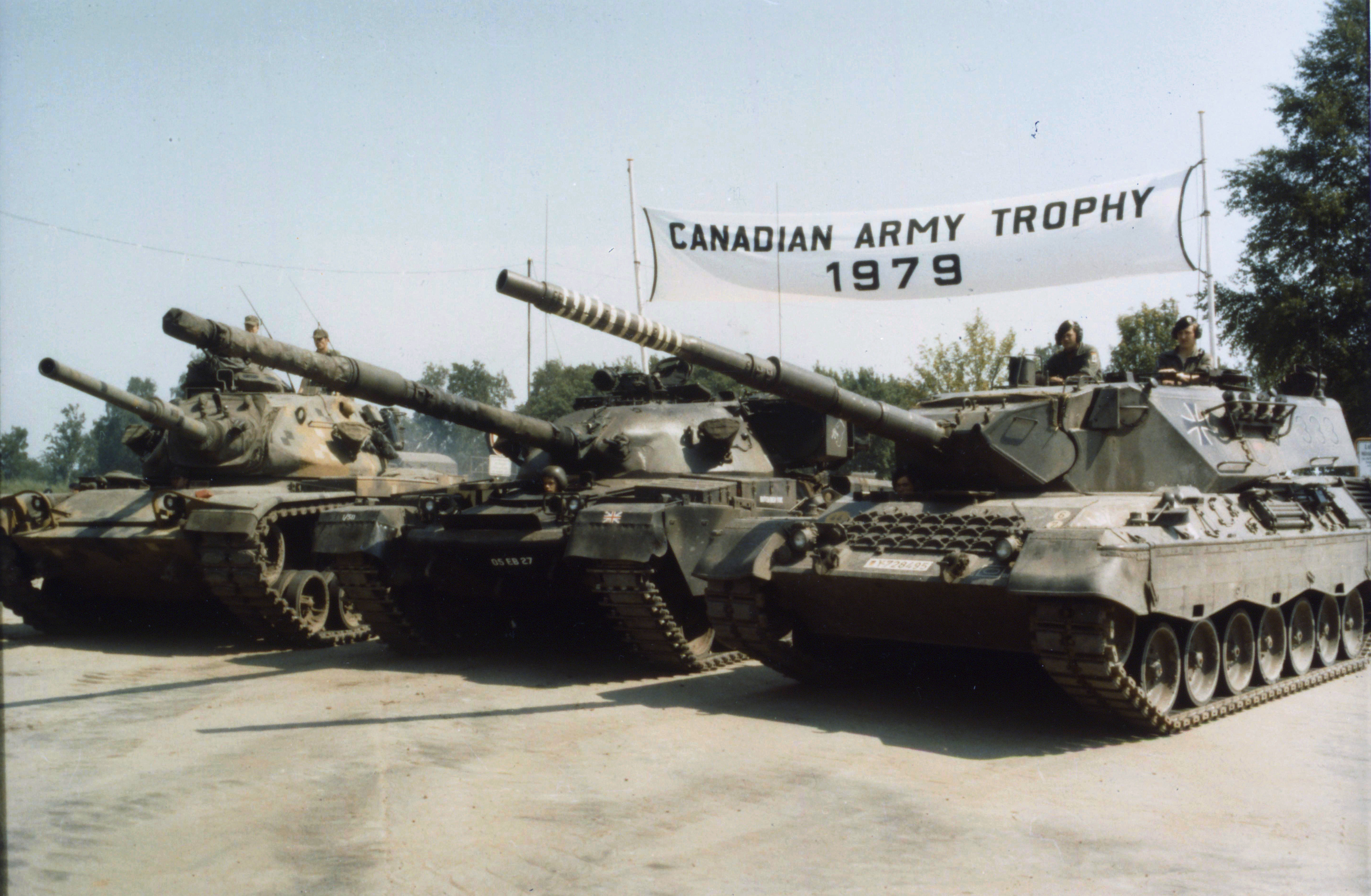
CAT '79. Left to right: US M60A1, British Chieftain, and German Leopard tanks.

The 1979 competition was held at Range 9, Bergen Hohne. The US built Range 10 at Grafenwöhr for the CAT competition training, it was used later for the actual 1981 competition. There were 20 platoons competing from Belgium, Canada, the United Kingdom, West Germany and the United States. The Netherlands team did not compete due to a contractual issue with their military union.

1979 was the first year the US team (M Company, 3/2nd ACR in 1979) did not finish last. M Company, 2nd Armored Cavalry Regiment, won recognition as the high scoring tank platoon in USAEUR tank gunnery in 1978 (1st Platoon, Lt. Andersson), with platoon leaders Lt. Krause (3rd), and Lt. Socha (2nd) following closely. Several individual crew members extended their tour with M Company, 3/2 ACR and carried considerable experience with them to the competition.

== CAT '81 ==
The 1981 competition was held on Range 10 at Grafenwöhr. There were 24 platoons competing from Belgium, Canada, the United Kingdom, the Netherlands, West Germany and the United States. The M60A3 used by the USA entry was the final development of the M60A3 until the 2001 IFCS modification produced by Raytheon and sold to Jordan.The United Kingdom was represented by the Queen's Own Hussars.

== CAT '83 ==
Held on Range 9 at Bergen-Hohne on 20 to 24 June, teams competed corresponding to their army group assignments within the Central Region, from Northern Army Group (NORTHAG) or Central Army Group (CENTAG). NORTHAG consisted of the British Army of the Rhine (BAOR)'s British I Corps, American III Corps Forward, German I Corps, Netherlands' I Corps, and Belgian I Corps. CENTAG consisted of the German II and III Corps, the American V and VII Corps, and 4 Canadian Mechanized Brigade Group.

This was the first year that the M1 Abrams participated in the competition, utilized by Charlie Company, 3/64 Armor Battalion, 3rd Infantry Division. The other two US tank companies were utilizing the M60 Patton tank. With the M1, Charlie Company's three platoons scored in second, third and eighth place. 1st Platoon Charlie Company, shooting on Day 1, scored in Second place overall with 19,294 points behind West Germany's 1st Platoon 2nd Company, 293rd Panzer Battalion. The West German Platoon, shooting on Day 3 after seeing all of the target arrays, won with the highest score of 21,153 points out of a maximum of 28,100 with their Leopard 1 tank. Charlie Company's Third Platoon shot third place with 18,068 points, and the Second Platoon shot eighth place with 16,116 points.

Many individuals involved with Charlie Company for CAT '83 extended their tour of duty of Germany to participate in CAT '85 with Alpha Company, 3/64 Armor. Finally, Charlie Company, 2/66 Armor surprised the competition by placing with its old M60A1 tanks, which used optical rangefinder technology from the World War II era. This showed the value of local course knowledge over pure technology.

== CAT '85 ==
The M1IP Abrams made its debut in the 1985 competition held on Range 9 at Bergen-Hohne, which contained small upgrades to the M1 Abrams that was previously used for the first time in the 1983 competition. This was the first direct competition of the German Leopard II and the US M1 Abrams. For the second time an American platoon, 1st Platoon of A Company 3-64 Armor, had scored 2nd overall in the competition and the United States' teams ranked third for the entire competition. B Company 3-32 Armor, of the 3rd Armored Division, used the M-60A3; the oldest generation of tanks during the competition.

C / 2-66 Armor competed with its new M1 tanks, but severe weather storms at the moment of their runs hampered visibility and caused them to underperform.

Two platoons from Royal Canadian Dragoons came last and 18th out of 20. This furthered domestic criticism about Canada's commitment to Europe's defense as well as the quality of its military.

== CAT '87 ==
In the 1987 competition held on Range 301 center lane at Grafenwöhr, there were a total of 24 platoons competing (12 from NORTHAG and 12 from CENTAG). There were significant rules and conditions changes made that governed the preparation and conduct of the competition, each Army Group would designate a minimum of one company from two different battalions; each separate brigade designates a minimum of two companies per country's Corps. The random selection of the tank companies to compete would be made by AFCENT (Allied Forces Central Europe) no later than 1 April 1987. NORTHAG fielded teams from Belgium, UK, the Netherlands, West Germany and the United States. CENTAG fielded teams from Canada, West Germany and the United States. The British (3-tank) tank platoons were presented 24 targets, while the other countries' 4-tank platoons were presented with 32 targets during the battle runs. Scoring was based on target hits, hit times, ammunition bonuses (only if all targets were hit), and hit bonuses (only if all targets were hit), machine gun hits, and penalties with a maximum platoon score of 22,600 points. The main gun targets were at ranges between 1,600-3,000 meters and would remain standing after being hit until presentation time, 40 seconds, had expired. No target would be presented twice, so the judges could actually count holes in the targets to verify target hits; "cookie bites" did not count as hits. This was the first year that United States won the CAT and had two platoons placing among the top three; 1st platoon D Company 4-8 Cavalry took top tank platoon honors and 1st Platoon A Company 3-64 Armor, scored third in the competition.

=== CAT '87 Teams by firing order for each Army Group ===
Northern Army Group

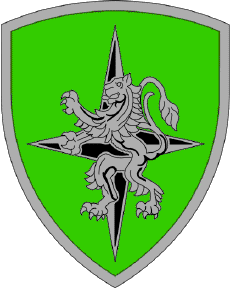
Central Army Group

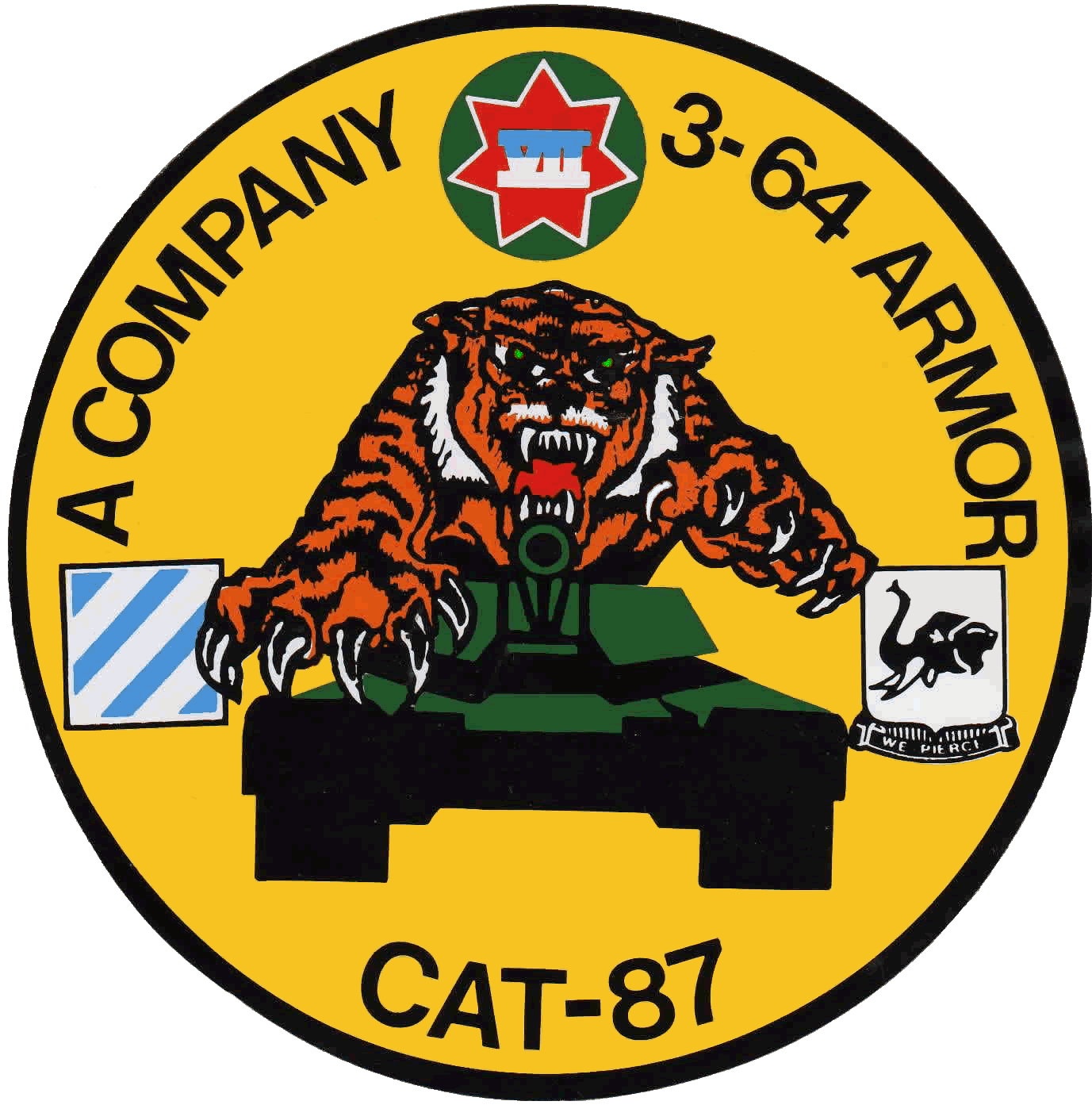
3-64 Armor

NORTHAG

- GBR, Royal Hussars, B Squadron, 3rd Troop
- DEU, PzBtl 324, 4th Company, 3rd Platoon
- NLD, 43 TkBat, C Company, 1st Platoon
- USA, 2-66 Armor, D Company, 1st Platoon
- BEL, 4 Lanciers, A Company, 3rd Platoon
- USA, 2-66 Armor, D Company, 2nd Platoon
- NLD, 43 TkBat, C Company, 3rd Platoon
- DEU, PzBtl 324, 4th Company, 1st Platoon
- GBR, Royal Hussars, B Squadron, 1st Troop
- USA, 2-66 Armor, D Company, 3rd Platoon
- BEL, 4 Lanciers, A Company, 1st Platoon
- GBR, Royal Hussars, B Squadron, 2nd Troop

CENTAG (awarded the trophy)

- USA, 3-64 Armor, A Company, 2nd Platoon
- USA, 4-8 Cav, D Company, 3rd Platoon
- CAN, Royal Canadian Dragoons, C Squadron, 1st Troop
- DEU, PzBtl 124, 4th Company, 2nd Platoon
- DEU, PzBtl 363, 3rd Company, 1st Platoon
- CAN, Royal Canadian Dragoons, C Squadron, 2nd Troop
- USA, 3-64 Armor, A Company, 3rd Platoon
- USA, 4-8 Cav, D Company, 2nd Platoon
- DEU, PzBtl 363, 3rd Company, 2nd Platoon
- DEU, PzBtl 124,4th Company, 1st Platoon Second Place
- USA, 3-64 Armor, A Company, 1st Platoon, Third Place
- USA, 4-8 Cav, D Company, 1st Platoon, First Place

== CAT '89 ==
The United Kingdom did not field a team during the 1989 competition held on Range 9 at Bergen-Hohne. It was the only time that night battle runs were incorporated into the competition. Cat '89 was won by the Dutch 41 Tankbat Alfa esquadron.

== CAT '91 ==
The United States and United Kingdom did not field teams due to the Gulf War, and hence it was a competition solely between Leopard 1 and Leopard 2 tanks. This was to be the last competition as the 4 Canadian Mechanized Brigade Group left Germany in 1993, resulting in the end of the CAT competitions.

== CANAM Cup ==
In 1997 the competition began again, but only between the United States and Canada as the CANAM Cup. The Canadians won in 1997, 2000, and 2002. The American teams won in 1999 and 2003.

== CAT '24 ==
Since 2017, NATO resumed its organized tank competition, also in Latvia, under the name ‘Iron Spear.’ In 2023, a British crew operating the Challenger 2 tank scored the most points. In 2024, the competition has reverted to its original name. The objective of the CAT 24 tank maneuvers is to jointly work on tactics, techniques, and procedures.

The shooting competition is designed to enhance and integrate the firepower of allies, as the announced by the command of the Latvian Armed Forces and is being held at the Ādaži training ground in Latvia. Tanks crews and combat vehicles from seven NATO countries, Italy, Canada, Great Britain, Norway, Poland, Spain and Germany, are in the exercises.

== Results ==
=== 1963 ===
Rank	Unit	Nation
1.	4e Lanciers	Belgium
2.	2. Kompanie Panzerbataillon 83	Germany
3.	11 / 41 / 43 / 101 Tankbataljon (combined)	Netherlands
4.	Fort Garry Horse	Canada
5.	5th Royal Tank Regiment	United Kingdom

=== 1964 ===
Rank	Unit	Nation
1.	4e Lancier	Belgium
1.	Panzerbataillon 83	Germany
3.	11th Hussars	United Kingdom
4.	43 Tankbataljon	Netherlands
5.	Fort Garry Horse	Canada

=== 1965 ===
Rank	Unit	Nation
1.	Royal Scots Greys	United Kingdom
2.	4e Lanciers	Belgium
3.	Fort Garry Horse	Canada
4.	11 Tankbataljon	Netherlands
5.	Panzerbataillon 83	Germany

=== 1966 ===
Rank	Unit	Nation
1.	13th/18th Royal Hussars (QMO)	United Kingdom
2.	4e Lanciers	Belgium
3.	Panzerbattaillon 324	Germany
4.	Lord Strathcona's Horse (RC)	Canada
5.	101 Tankbataljon	Netherlands

=== 1967 ===
Rank	Unit	Nation
1.	Lord Strathcona's Horse (RC)	Canada
2.	15th/19th The King's Royal Hussars	United Kingdom
3.	4e Lanciers	Belgium
4.	Panzerbataillon 83	Germany
5.	41 Tankbataljon	Netherlands

=== 1968 ===
Rank	Unit	Nation
1.	1er Lanciers	Belgium
2.	Panzerbataillon 33	Germany
3.	Royal Scots Greys	United Kingdom
4.	43 Tankbataljon	Netherlands
5.	Lord Strathcona's Horse (RC)	Canada

=== 1970 ===
Rank	Unit	Nation
1.	16th/5th The Queen's Royal Lancers	United Kingdom
2.	Panzerbattaillon 33/34	Germany
3.	Lord Strathcona's Horse (RC)	Canada

=== 1973 ===
Rank	Unit	Nation
1.	Panzerbataillon 83	Germany
2.	Queen's Royal Irish Hussars	United Kingdom
3.	11 Tankbataljon	Netherlands

=== 1975 ===
Rank	Unit	Nation
1.	Panzerbataillon 84	Germany
2.	Royal Hussars (Prince of Wales Own)	United Kingdom
3.	2e Lanciers	Belgium

=== 1977 ===
Rank	Unit	Nation
1.	Royal Canadian Dragoons	Canada
2.	Panzerbattaillon 144	Germany
3.	1er Lanciers	Belgium
4.	17th/21st Lancers	United Kingdom
6.	11 Tankbataljon - B squadron	Netherlands
6.	2nd Battalion 81st Armor	U.S.A.

11 tankbataljon / B squadron / 2e troop - winning troop of tanks.

=== 1979 ===
Rank	Unit	Nation
1.	Panzerbataillon 284	Germany
2.	2e Lanciers	Belgium
3.	4th/7th Royal Dragoon Guards	United Kingdom
4.	M Co. 3rd Squadron, 2nd Armored Cavalry Regiment	U.S.A.
5.	Royal Canadian Dragoons	Canada

=== 1981 ===
Rank	Unit	Nation
1.	Panzerbattaillon 294	Germany
2.	2e Lanciers	Belgium
3.	1st Battalion 32nd Armor	U.S.A.
4.	Royal Canadian Dragoons	Canada
5.	Queen's Own Hussars	United Kingdom
6.	41 Tankbataljon	Netherlands

=== 1983 ===
Rank	Unit	Nation
1.	CENTAG:	
	Panzerbataillon 2/293	Germany
	Panzerbataillon 3/153	Germany
	1st Battalion 32nd Armor	U.S.A.
	3rd Battalion 64th Armor	U.S.A.
	Royal Canadian Dragoons	Canada
2.	NORTHAG:	
	4e Lanciers	Belgium
	Royal Scots Dragoon Guards	United Kingdom
	Panzerbataillon 74	Germany
	11 Tankbataljon	Netherlands
	2nd Battalion 66th Armor	U.S.A.

=== 1985 ===
Rank	Unit	Nation
1.	NORTHAG:	
	2e LANCIERS	Belgium
	2nd BATTALION 66th ARMOR	U.S.A.
	Panzerbataillon 24	Germany
	43 Tankbataljon	Netherlands
	Royal Scots Dragoon Guards	United Kingdom
2.	CENTAG:	
	3rd BATTALION 64th ARMOR	U.S.A.
	3rd BATTALION 32nd ARMOR	U.S.A.
	Panzerbataillon 63	Germany
	Royal Canadian Dragoons	Canada
	Panzerbataillon 244	Germany

=== 1987 ===
Rank	Unit	Nation
1.	CENTAG:	
(1)	4th BATTALION 8th CAVALRY	U.S.A.
(2)	Panzerbataillon 124	Germany
(3)	3rd BATTALION 64th ARMOR	U.S.A.
	Panzerbataillon 363	Germany
	Royal Canadian Dragoons	Canada
2.	NORTHAG:	
	43 Tankbataljon	Netherlands
	4e LANCIERS	Belgium
	2nd Battalion 66th Armor	U.S.A.
	Panzerbattaillon 324	Germany
	The Royal Hussars	United Kingdom

=== 1989 ===
Rank	Unit	Nation
1.	NORTHAG:	
(1)	41 Tankbataljon	Netherlands
	Panzerbataillon 203	Germany
	2de Regiment Gidsen	Belgium
	3rd BATTALION 66th ARMOR	U.S.A.
2.	CENTAG:	
	Panzerbataillon 123	Germany
	2nd BATTALION 64th ARMOR	U.S.A.
	8th Canadian Hussars (Princess Louise's)	Canada
	4th BATTALION 32nd ARMOR	U.S.A.

=== 1991 ===
Rank	Unit	Nation	Tank
1	NORTHAG:		
(1)	4. Kompanie, Panzerbataillon 84	Germany	Leopard 2
(2)	C Eskadron, 43 Tankbataljon	Netherlands	Leopard 2A4
(5)	3e Regiment de Lanciers	Belgium	Leopard 1A5
2	CENTAG:		
(2)	2. Kompanie, Panzerbataillon 153	Germany	Leopard 2A4
(4)	C Squadron, 8th Canadian Hussars	Canada	Leopard 1A4

== See also ==
- Military exercise
- Cold War
- Tank Biathlon
- Strong Europe Tank Challenge
- Worthington Trophy
