= Regiment Huzaren Prins van Oranje =

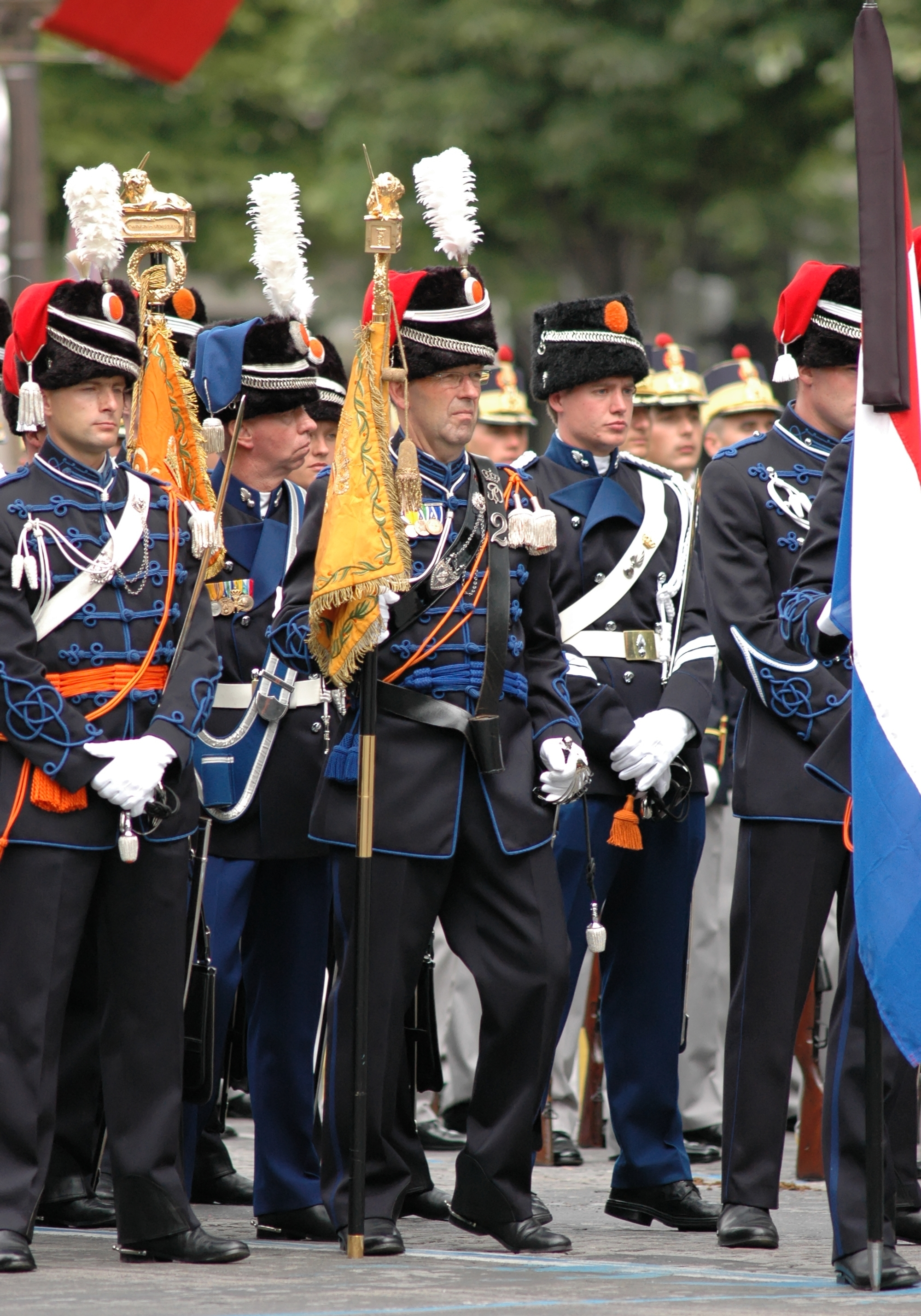
Hussars in dress uniform on the Champs-Élysées during the Bastille Day Military Parade 2007 military parade

The Regiment Huzaren Prins van Oranje was an armoured regiment of the Royal Netherlands Army, named after Prince Willem, Prince of Orange, eldest son of King Willem II. The regiment served as part of 43 Gemechaniseerde (Mechanized) Brigade operating the Leopard 2 main battle tank.

The Regiment Huzaren Prinses Catharina-Amalia, which is a company in the 414th Panzer Battalion plus Cavalry Mounted Escort Squadron and Mounted Units Regimental Band, is a cavalry regiment formed in late 2020 through the amalgamation of three other Dutch cavalry regiments that, at the time, existed in suspension - the Regiment Huzaren Prins Alexander, Regiment Huzaren Van Sytzama and Regiment Huzaren Prins van Oranje.

== History ==
Shortly before the Battle of Waterloo, Major Count du Chastel de la Hovarderie was ordered by the King to form a Regiment of Carabiniers Land militia. When the Battle of Waterloo took place, the unit was not yet sufficiently trained so was in the 'Reserve Armee'.

From 1816-67 the regiments designation successively changed. In 1841, it was transformed into a Dragoon regiment (2nd Dragoon Regiment), followed by another transformation in 1867, when it became the 2nd Hussar Regiment.

The regiment fought with distinction against the Belgians during the Ten Day Campaign (Tiendaagse Veldtocht) in August 1831. From 1922 to 1939 the Dutch army went through severe cutbacks, and the 4 hussar regiments were halved.

In the mobilisation after 1939, the Dutch army wanted to improve its organisation, and a large move took place on May 1, 1941. This moved units around, meaning that the defenders advantage of knowing the terrain was often lost. There were only 2 squadrons of armoured cars in the regiment. Until May 1940 the cavalry was still partly on horseback. The unit fought through the whole time the Netherlands was in the war. The regiment had several clashes with Germans, and was often bombed by German planes. Their main action was defending the bridges at Geertruidenberg and Keizersveer, preventing an SS-Brigade from crossing the bridges despite heavy fighting. The regiment was disbanded after the armistice in 1940, but was raised again in 1978, as the Regiment Huzaren Prins van Oranje.

== Battle honours ==
Tiendaagse Veldtocht 1831
