= Worthington cup =

Worthington Cup may refer to:

- The Football League Cup, an English professional football trophy, known by this name when sponsored by the Worthington brand of beer between 1998 and 2003
- The Worthington Trophy, a Canadian military award
