= Roman Bahaiev =

Ukrainian military personnel

- Роман Багаєв

Personal details
- Born: Roman Serhiiovych Bahaiev
- Nickname: Тюльпан (Tiulpan)

Military service
- Allegiance: Ukraine
- Branch/service: Armed Forces of Ukraine
- Rank: Pidpolkovnyk
- Battles/wars: Russo-Ukrainian War
- Awards: Order of Bohdan Khmelnytsky

Roman Serhiiovych Bahaiev (Ukrainian: Роман Сергійович Багаєв, born in Crimea) is a Ukrainian serviceman, pidpolkovnyk of the Armed Forces of Ukraine, a participant of the Russian-Ukrainian war.

In 2019, he was included in the rating of "30 young leaders of Ukraine under 30" by the Kyiv Post.

== Biography ==
He graduated from the Kremenchuk Lyceum with enhanced military and physical training (2007), Kharkiv Institute of Tank Troops.

In 2013, he was redeployed to the 51st Separate Mechanized Brigade, where he served as deputy commander and commander of the 1st Tank Company. Then he proved to be a talented commander of T-64 main battle tanks. As part of the Kolos Special Forces Battalion, he fought in eastern Ukraine.

In 2016, he was awarded the Order of Bohdan Khmelnytsky, III class, for effective command of combat operations as part of the Kolos Battalion of the 51st Special Forces Brigade in eastern Ukraine. Later, he headed the armored company of the 14th separate mechanized brigade.

In 2016 and 2017, Roman Bahaiev and his men were recognized as the best tank platoon in the Armed Forces of Ukraine. For two years in a row, his unit was chosen to represent Ukraine at the Strong Europe Tank Challenge.

In 2018, after the expiration of his five-year contract, he decided to resign from the service.

In 2019, he became the deputy commander of the tank battalion of the 14th Separate Mechanized Brigade for weapons.

== Awards ==
- Order of Bohdan Khmelnytsky, II class (2 October 2023)
- Order of Bohdan Khmelnytsky, III class (9 September 2016)

== Military ranks ==
- Pidpolkovnyk
- Major
- Captain
- Senior Lieutenant
