= Tank battalions of the German Army 1956–2008 =

Tank Battalions of the Bundeswehr 1956–2008

Units name	Raising (out of)	Garrisons	Remaining	Notes
PzLehrBtl	April 1956	Munster	renamed December 1958; PzLehrBtl 93	
PzBtl 1	Juli 1956	Dedelstorf since 1957 Augustdorf (Generalfeldmarschall-Rommel-Kaserne)	renamed March 1959 PzBtl 213	
PzBtl 2	1956	Hemer	renaming March 1959 PzBtl 204	
PzBtl 3	August 1956	Hamburg (Graf-Goltz-Kaserne)	renaming March 1959 PzBtl 174	
PzBtl 4	September 1956	Amberg	renaming March 1959 PzBtl 123	
PzBtl 5	September 1956	Hohenfels since 1957 Koblenz	renaming March 1959 PzBtl 143	
GebPzBtl 8	October 1981	Pocking	September 1996 inactive	Reserve unit in Pfreimd. Since September 2014 partly reactivated with two active companies as a Reserve Unit in Pfreimd.
PzBtl 13	August 1956	Flensburg; 1958 Boostedt	renaming March 1959 PzBtl 183	
PzBtl 14	Juli 1959	Koblenz; 1959 Stadtoldendorf; 1962 Hildesheim (Gallwitz-Kaserne)	disbanded September 1992	
PzBtl 15	September 1956	Grafenwöhr	renamed Januar 1959 PzBtl 134	
PzBtl 21	April 1981	Braunschweig	disbanded September 1992	
PzBtl 23	Januar 1958	Schwanewede	renamed March 1959 PzBtl 324	
PzBtl 23	April 1976	Braunschweig	disbanded September 1992	
PzBtl 24	July 1960	Dedelstorf; 1962 Braunschweig (Roselies- / Heinrich der Löwe-Kaserne)	disbanded Dezember 2003	Canadian Army Trophy team, 1985
PzBtl 25	September 1956	Koblenz	renamed 1 April 1959 PzBtl 153	
PzBtl 31	1981	Nienburg	disbanded September 1992	
PzBtl 33	December 1958	Munster; 1959 Dörverden; 1965 Luttmersen	Was remodeled into PzGrenBtl 33 (MechInfBtl) beginning summer of 2015	Canadian Army Trophy team, 1968, 1970
PzBtl 34	April 1959	Nienburg; 1969 Scheuen	renamed October 1981 PzBtl 334	Canadian Army Trophy team, 1970
PzBtl 34	October 1981 (PzBtl 334)	Nienburg	disbanded September 1992	
PzBtl 44	January 1962	Allendorf; Arolsen	1975 divided into PzBtl 342 und PzBtl 343	
PzBtl 44	October 1980	Göttingen	disbanded September 1992	
PzBtl 53	April 1976	Hessisch-Lichtenau	disbanded March 1983	
PzBtl 54	Januar 1959	Wetzlar; 1960 Wolfhagen	October 1981 renamed PzBtl 64	
PzBtl 54	October 1981	Hessisch-Lichtenau	disbanded September 1992	
PzBtl 61	October 1980	Wolfhagen	disbanded September 1992	
PzBtl 63	March 1959	Stadtallendorf	October 1981 renamed PzBtl 143	
PzBtl 63	October 1981 (PzBtl 342)	Arolsen	disbanded December 2002	Canadian Army Trophy team, 1985
PzBtl 64	April 1961	Stadtallendorf (Hessen-Kaserne)	October 1981 renamed PzBtl 144	
PzBtl 64	October 1981 (PzBtl 54)	Wolfhagen	disbanded June 2008	at last with Panzerbrigade 14 / 14th Tank Brigade
PzBtl 73	April 1992 (PzGrenBtl 73, PzBtl 324)	Cuxhaven Altenwalde	disbanded 2003	as inactive unit
PzBtl 74	April 1959	1959 Seedorf; 1963 Altenwalde	disbanded December 2003	Canadian Army Trophy team, 1983
PzBtl 81	Oktober 1980	Lüneburg, Schlieffen-Kaserne	disbanded September 1992	
PzBtl 83	1958	Lüneburg, Schlieffen-Kaserne	Reserve unit since April 1992, inactive 1996	Canadian Army Trophy winner 1973; team 1963, 1964, 1965, 1967
PzBtl 84	July 1959	Lüneburg, Schlieffen-Kaserne	disbanded December 2002	Canadian Army Trophy winner 1975, 1991
PzLehrBtl 91	January 1980	Munster (Örtze), Georg Freiherr von Boeselager - Kaserne	disbanded September 1992	
PzLehrBtl 93	December 1958 (PzLehrBtl)	Munster	—	in service with Panzerlehrbrigade 9
PzLehrBtl 94	Juli 1960	Munster	disbanded September 1992	
PzBtl 94	1997	Celle	inactive since June 2008	Reserve unit
PzBtl 104	November 1960	Amberg	renamed October 1971 PzBtl 303	
PzBtl 104	April 1981	Pfreimd	—	in service with Panzerbrigade 12
PzBtl 110	April 1970 (PzBtl 204)	Hemer	renamed April 1975 PzBtl 202	
PzBtl 114	September 1962	Gärmersdorf; 1963 Neunburg vorm Wald	remodeled October 1970 PanzerJgBtl 114 (Anti Tank Battalion)	
PzBtl 114	April 1981	Neunburg vorm Wald	disbanded September 1992	
PzBtl 120	March 1970	Hemer	renamed April 1975 PzBtl 203	
PzBtl 121	April 1981	Kümmersbruck, Schweppermann-Kaserne	disbanded September 1992	
PzBtl 123	March 1959 (PzBtl4)	Amberg; 1960 Gärmersdorf (Kümmersbruck, Schweppermann-Kaserne)	disbanded September 1994	Canadian Army Trophy winner 1989
PzBtl 124	June 1959	Grafenwöhr; 1960 Gärmersdorf-Kümmersbruck, Schweppermann-Kaserne	disbanded September 1994	Canadian Army Trophy team, 1987
PzBtl 134	January 1959 (PzBtl 15)	Wetzlar (Sixt von Armin-Kaserne)	disbanded September 1992	
PzBtl 141	October 1981	Stadtallendorf, Hessenkaserne	disbanded September 1992	
PzBtl 143	March 1959 (PzBtl 5)	Koblenz, Fritsch-Kaserne	renamed October 1981 PzBtl 343	
PzBtl 143	October 1981 (PzBtl 63)	Stadtallendorf, Hessenkaserne	disbanded June 2003	
PzBtl 144	April 1959	Koblenz, Gneisenau-Kaserne	renamed October 1981 PzBtl 344	
PzBtl 144	October 1981 (PzBtl 64)	Stadtallendorf, Hessenkaserne	inactive since 1991, disbanded 2003	Canadian Army Trophy team 1977
PzBtl 151	October 1981	Koblenz, Fritsch-Kaserne	disbanded September 1992	
PzBtl 153	April 1959 (PzBtl 25)	Koblenz, Fritsch-Kaserne	inactive since 1992, disbanded 31 December 2002	Canadian Army Trophy team, 1983, 1991
PzBtl 154	October 1967	Hessisch-Lichtenau	disbanded October 1981	
PzBtl 154	October 1981	Westerburg, Wäller-Kaserne	disbanded 21 September 2006	
PzBtl 164	November 1961	Flensburg; 1969: Schwarzenbek, Elmenhorst/Lanken, Sachsenwald Kaserne	disbanded September 1994	
PzBtl 174	March 1959 (PzBtl 3)	Hamburg	disbanded September 1992	
PzBtl 181		Neumünster (Scholtz-Kaserne)	disbanded September 1992	
PzBtl 183	March 1959 (PzBtl 13)	Boostedt	inactive 2007	Reserve unit
PzBtl 184	April 1959	Boostedt	disbanded July 2008 (Rantzau Kaserne Boostedt	inactive since September 1992
PzBtl 194	April 1959 (PzJgBtl 5)	Münster	disbanded September 1992	
PzBtl 201	October 1980	Hemer, 1. & 4. Kp Ahlen	disbanded September 1992	
PzBtl 202	April 1975 (PzBtl 110)	Hemer	October 1980 renamed PzBtl 204	
PzBtl 203	April 1975 (PzBtl 120)	Hemer; 2007 Augustdorf	—	in service with Panzerbrigade 21 Canadian Army Trophy winner 1989
PzBtl 204	March 1959 (PzBtl 2)	Hemer	April 1970 renamed PzBtl 110	
PzBtl 204	October 1980 (PzBtl 202)	Ahlen; 1992 Hemer	disbanded June 2002	
PzBtl 210	October 1970 (PzBtl 303)	Dornstadt	April 1975 renamed PzBtl 282	
PzBtl 211	October 1980	Augustdorf	disbanded September 1992	
PzBtl 213	March 1959 (PzBtl 1)	Augustdorf	disbanded September 1992	
PzBtl 214	June 1959	Augustdorf	disbanded October 2002	
PzBtl 220	October 1971 (PzBtl 304)	Dornstadt	April 1975 renamed PzBtl 284	
GebPzBtl 224	April 1966 (PzBtl 243)	Landsberg	remodeled February 1971 into GebPzJgBtl 224 (Mountain Anti Tank battalion)	
GebPzBtl 224	April 1981	Landsberg	disbanded September 1992	
GebPzBtl 234	October 1964	Pocking	remodeled October 1971 into GebPzJgBtl 234 (Mountain Anti Tank battalion)	
GebPzBtl 241	October 1981	Landshut; 1985 Kirchham	disbanded September 1992	
GebPzBtl 243	April 1959	Traunstein; 1960 Landsberg	renamed April 1966 GebPzBtl 224	
GebPzBtl 243	October 1981	Kirchham	disbanded April 1996	
GebPzBtl 244	April 1959	Landshut	disbanded September 1992	Canadian Army Trophy winner 1985
PzBtl 273	April 1959	Böblingen	divided Oktober 1963 into PzBtl 363 & PzBtl 364	
PzBtl 281	April 1981 (PzBtl 282)	Dornstadt	disbanded September 1992	
PzBtl 282	April 1975 (PzBtl 210)	Dornstadt	April 1981 renamed PzBtl 281	
PzBtl 283	April 1976	Münsingen	remodeled April 1992 into FschPzAbwBtl 283 (Airborne anti Tank Battalion)	
PzBtl 284	October 1968	Dornstadt	April 1970 renamed PzBtl 304	Canadian Army Trophy winner 1979
PzBtl 284	April 1975 (PzBtl 220)	Dornstadt; 1992 Heidenheim	inactive 1992, disbanded March 2004	
PzBtl 291	April 1981	Lager Heuberg	disbanded September 1992	
PzBtl 293	April 1970	Münsingen	renamed October 1971 PzBtl 303	Canadian Army Trophy winner 1983
PzBtl 293	October 1971 (PzBtl 304)	Lager Heuberg	disbanded September 1992	
PzBtl 294	March 1959 (PzBtl 322)	Stetten a.k.Markt	September 1992 remodeled into PzGrenBtl 294	Canadian Army Trophy winner 1981
PzBtl 303	March 1959 (PzBtl 310)	Münsingen; 1962 Dornstadt	Oktober 1971 remodeled into PzRgt 200 (Tank Regiment 200)	
PzBtl 303	October 1971 (PzBtl 293) (PzBtl 294)	Amberg; 1973 Heidenheim	April 1981 renamed PzBtl 304	
PzBtl 304	August 1959	Münsingen	April 1970 renamed PzBtl 293	
PzBtl 304	April 1970 (PzBtl 284)	Dornstadt	Oktober 1971 remodeled into PzRgt 200 (Tank Regiment 200)	
PzBtl 304	Oktober 1971	Münsingen	disbanded March 1981	
PzBtl 304	April 1981 (PzBtl 303)	Heidenheim	disbanded March 2004	
PzBtl 310	April 1958	Augustdorf; 1958 Münsingen	March 1959 renamed PzBtl 303	
PzBtl 311	1988 (PzGrenBtl 311)	Delmenhorst	September 1992	inactive unit
PzBtl 314	April 1961	Oldenburg	October 1992 remodeled into FschJgBtl 314 (314th Airborne Battalion)	
PzBtl 322	März 1958	Großengstingen	March 1959 renamed PzBtl 294	
PzBtl 324	March 1959 (PzBtl 23)	Schwanewede	disbanded September 1992, parts transferred to PzBtl 73 Canadian Army Trophy team 1966, 1987	
PzBtl 331	April 1981	Celle	disbanded September 1992	
PzBtl 333	March 1959	Lingen	renamed April 1981 PzBtl 523	
PzBtl 333	October 1981	Celle	disbanded September 1992	
PzBtl 334	October 1972	Nienburg	Oktober 1981 renamed PzBtl 34	
PzBtl 334	October 1981 (PzBtl 34)	Nienburg	Oktober 1992 renamed PzLBtl 334	
PzLehrBtl 334	October 1992 (PzBtl 334)	Celle (Freiherr von Fritsch Kaserne)	disbanded June 2006	
PzBtl 341	October 1980	Koblenz (Gneisenau-Kaserne)	disbanded September 1992	
PzBtl 342	March 1975 (PzBtl 44)	Arolsen	April 1981 renamed PzBtl 63	
PzBtl 343	April 1975 (PzBtl 44)	Arolsen	disbanded October 1980	
PzBtl 343	October 1981 (PzBtl 143)	Koblenz (Augusta-Kaserne)	remodeled into an inactive MechInfBattalion PzGrenBtl 343	
PzBtl 344	October 1981 (PzBtl 144)	Koblenz (Gneisenau-Kaserne)	disbanded September 1992	
PzBtl 354	January 1960	Hammelburg	disbanded September 1992	
PzBtl 361	October 1980	Külsheim	disbanded September 1992	
PzBtl 363	October 1963 (PzBtl 273)	Böblingen; 1964 Külsheim (Prinz-Eugen-Kaserne)	disbanded 30 Oktober 2006	Canadian Army Trophy team, 1987
PzBtl 364	Oktober 1963 (PzBtl 273)	Böblingen; 1964 Külsheim	disbanded June 2002	
PzBtl 373	April 1991	Kirchhain	disbanded April 1996	
PzBtl 383	March 1991	Bad Frankenhausen, Kyffhäuser Kaserne	disbanded 30 Juni 2007	
PzBtl 384		Bad Frankenhausen, Kyffhäuser-Kaserne	disbanded 30 June 2008	always inactive
PzBtl 393	March 1991	Bad Salzungen; Bad Frankenhausen	—	in service with Panzergrenadierbrigade 37
PzBtl 403	April 1991	Schwerin-Sternbuchholz (Blücher-Kaserne)	disbanded 2 November 2006	
PzBtl 404	April 1991	Schwerin-Sternbuchholz (Blücher-Kaserne)	disbanded 30 September 2007	inactive since 1991 (?)
PzBtl 413	Mai 1991	Torgelow	—	was remodeled into active JgBtl 413 (413th Rifles Battalion) with Panzergrenadierbrigade 41 in October 2015
PzBtl 414	1991	Spechtberg	disbanded 2006	inactive unit
PzBtl 423	March 1991	Brück	disbanded March 2003	
PzBtl 424	1991	Brück	disbanded 2002	inactive unit

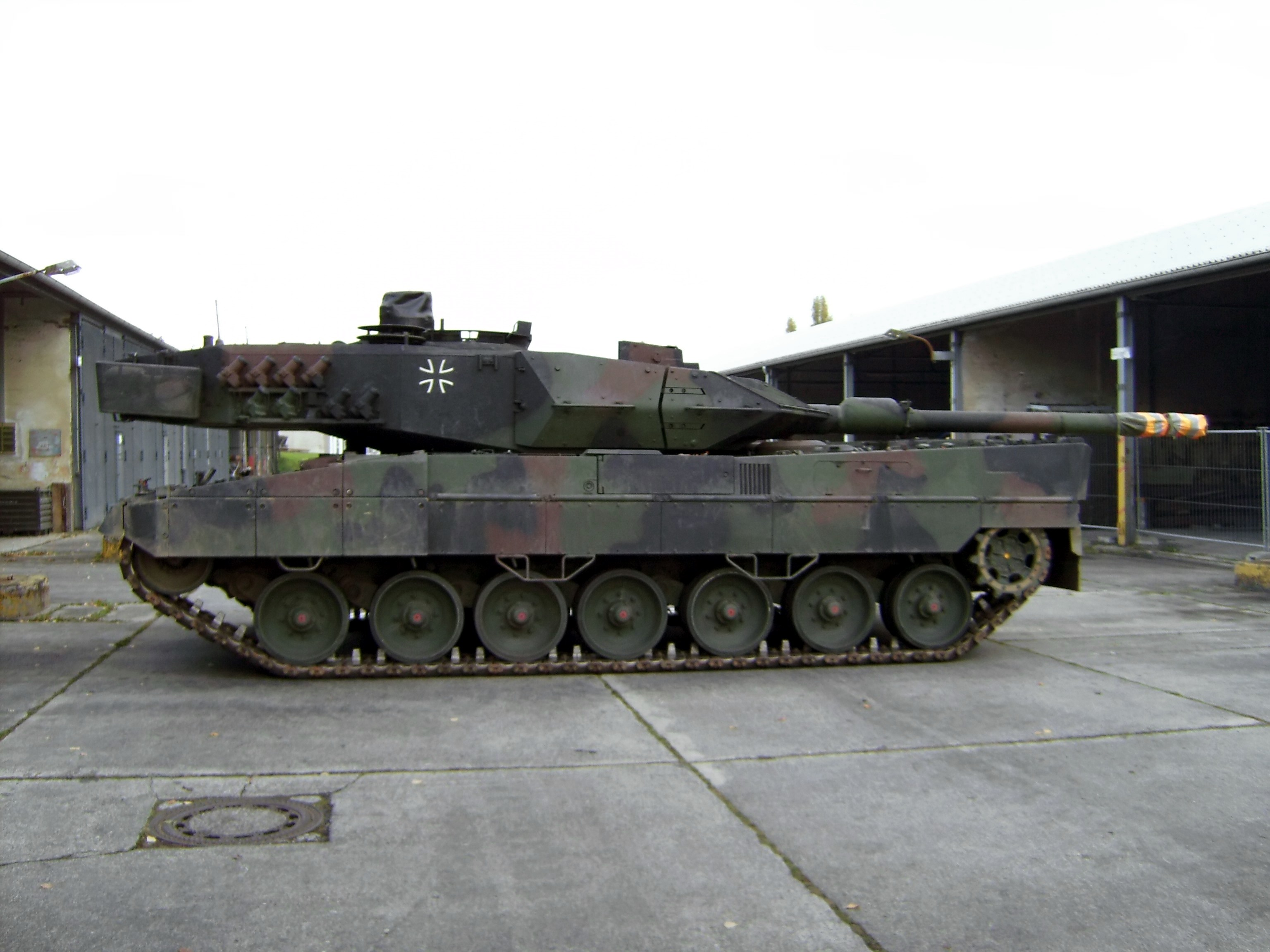
Leopard 2A6M

Coat of Arms 1 Panzerdivision

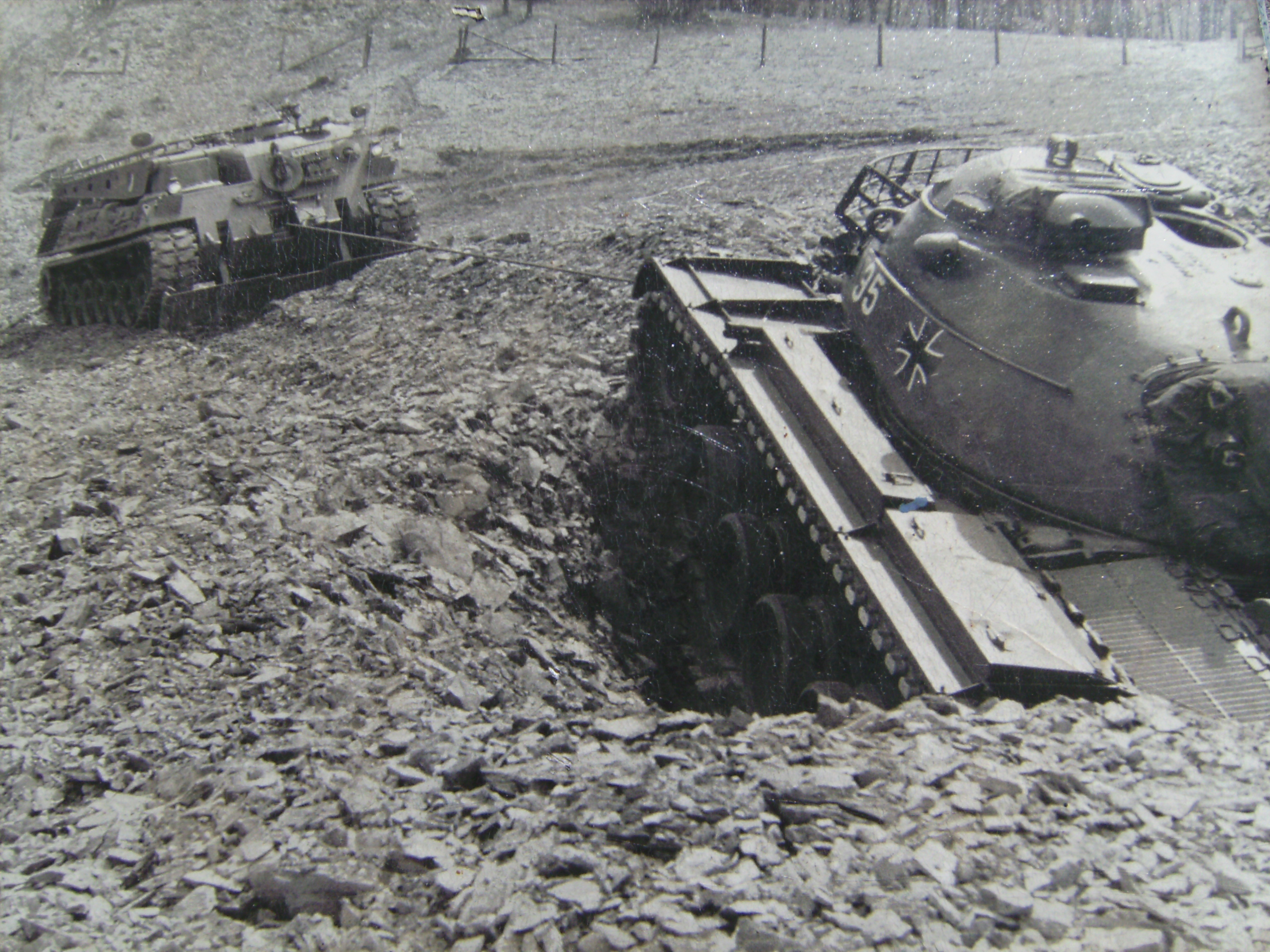
Tank recovering

Coat of Arms 10 Panzerdivision

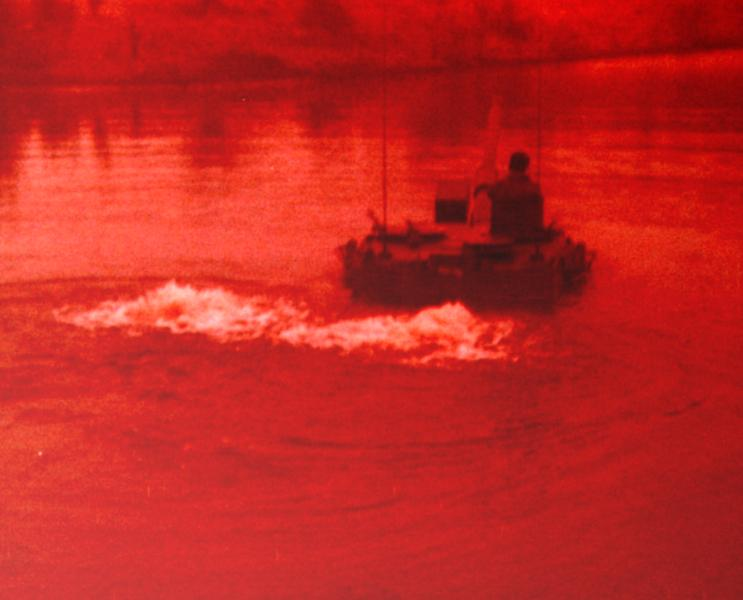
Leopard 1A2 of PzBtl 153 crossing a river at night

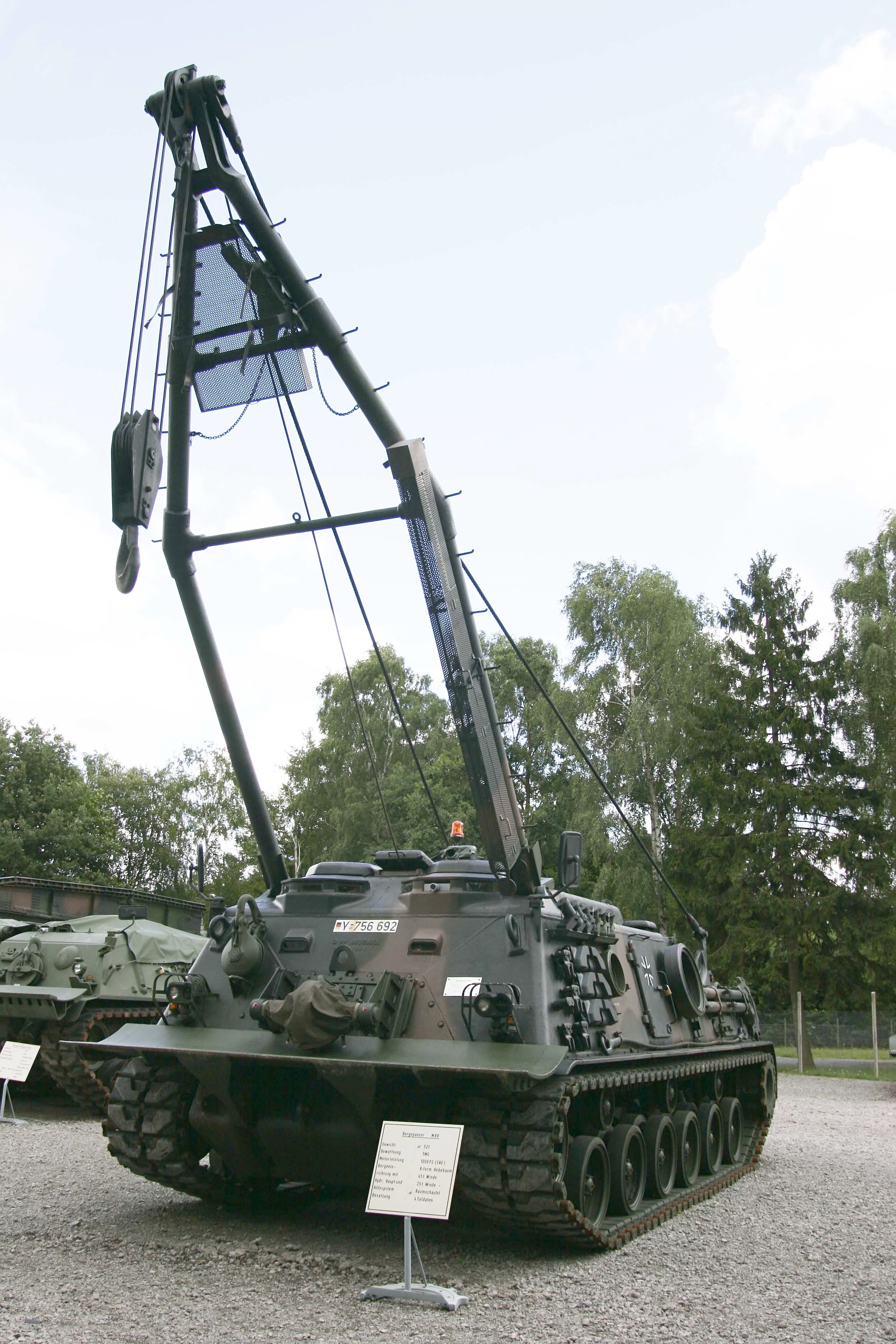
M 88 Recovery Tank

== Territory Defense Units ==
=== Semi-active battalions (Home Defence Forces) ===
Unit name	Raising	Garrisons	Remaining	Notice
PzBtl 513	April 1981	Flensburg	disbanded September 1992	
PzBtl 514 (tmob)	April 1981	Flensburg	disbandes February 1992	no HQ company, no support platoon, no maintenance platoon, appendix of PzBtl 513
PzBtl 523	October 1981 (out of PzBtl 333)	Lingen	remodeling into JgBtl 523 (523rd Rifles Battalion) in October 1991	
PzBtl 524 (tmob)	Okt. 1981	Lingen	disbanded October 1991	no HQ company, no support platoon, no maintenance platoon, appendix of PzBtl 523
PzBtl 533	October 1981	Düren	October 1991 remodeled into JgBtl. 533	
PzBtl 534	October 1981	Düren	disbanded September 1992	
PzBtl 543	October 1981	Hermeskeil	disbanded October 1991	
PzBtl 544 (tmob)	October 1981	Hermeskeil	disbanded October 1991	no HQ company, no support platoon, no maintenance platoon, appendix of PzBtl 543
PzBtl 553	October 1981	Lager Heuberg	disbanded September 1992	
PzBtl 554	October 1981	Lager Heuberg	disbanded September 1992	
PzBtl 563	October 1981	Landshut	disbanded September 1992	
PzBtl 564	October 1981	Landshut	disbanded September 1993	

=== Non-active units (reserves) ===
Unit name	Raising	Garrisons	Remaining	Notice
PzBtl 613	October 1983	Hamburg	disbanded September 1991	
PzBtl 623	April 1984	Wietmarschen-Lohne	disbanded September 1992	
PzBtl 633	April 1984	Ahlen	disbanded September 1992	
PzBtl 643	April 1984	Baumholder-Lager Aulenbach	disbanded September 1992	
PzBtl 653	January 1983	Münsingen	disbanded September 1992	
PzBtl 663	Apr. 1982	Heidenheim	disbanded June 1993	

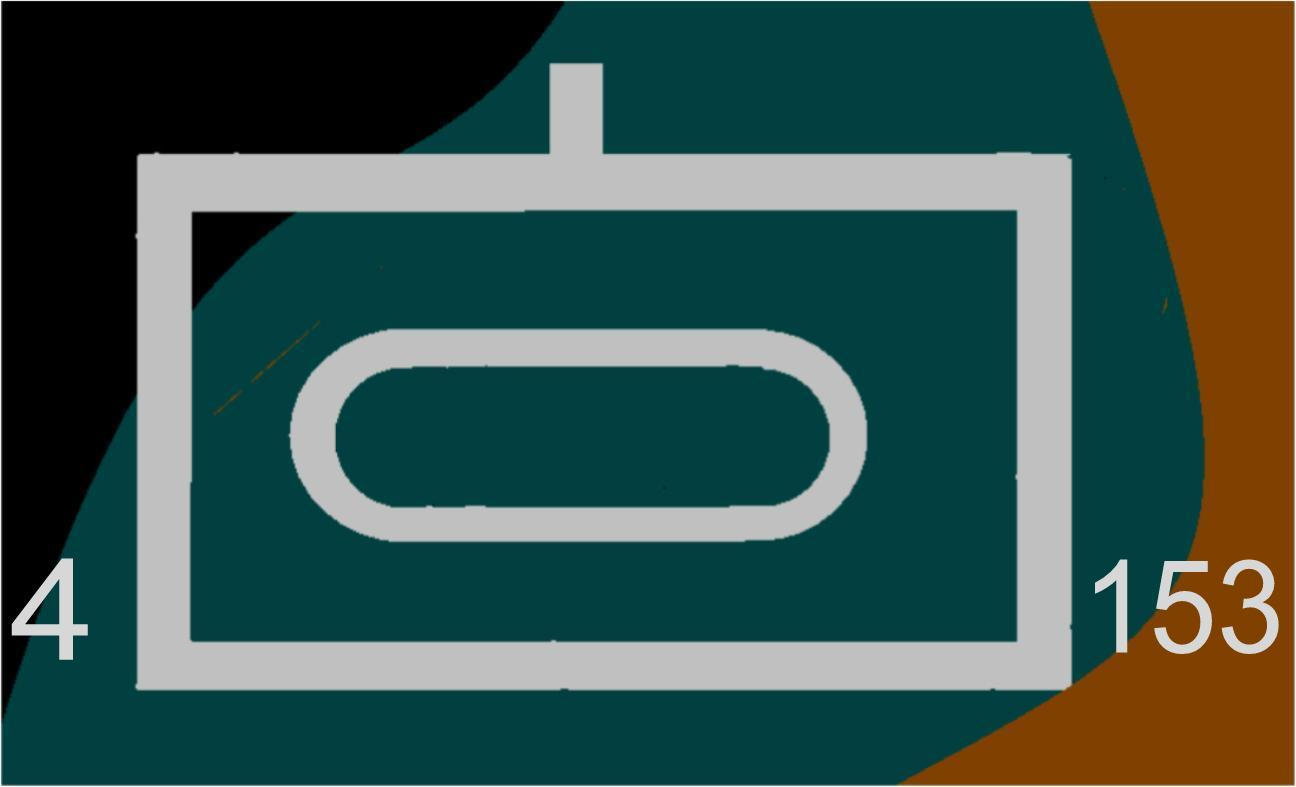
PzBtl 153 tactical sign

=== Remaining units ===
2 tank divisions (Panzerdivisionen) with a total of: 3 tank brigades (Panzerbrigaden) 4 tank battalions (Panzerbataillone)

- Panzerlehrbataillon 93, Munster, part of Panzerlehrbrigade 9
- Panzerbataillon 104, Pfreimd, part of Panzerbrigade 12
- Panzerbataillon 203, Augustdorf, part of Panzerbrigade 21
- Panzerbataillon 393, Bad Salzungen, part of Panzergrenadierbrigade 37

== Others ==
This list does not include the Panzerjäger (tank destroyer units), at last 39 independent and the companies to assigned brigades of the main combat forces, equipped with Kanonenjagdpanzer and Raketenjagdpanzer Jaguar 1 / Jaguar 2. As well the tank destroyer units of the Home Defence Forces altogether 12 independent companies, equipped with Kanonenjagdpanzer and MBT M48 (90mm gun).

== Sources ==
- Military Balance 1982/83, International Institute for Strategic Studies, London
- Tanks of the World. F.M. von Senger und Etterlin. Arms and Armor Press, London, 1983.
