= Regiment Infanterie Oranje Gelderland =

45 Painfbat RIOG
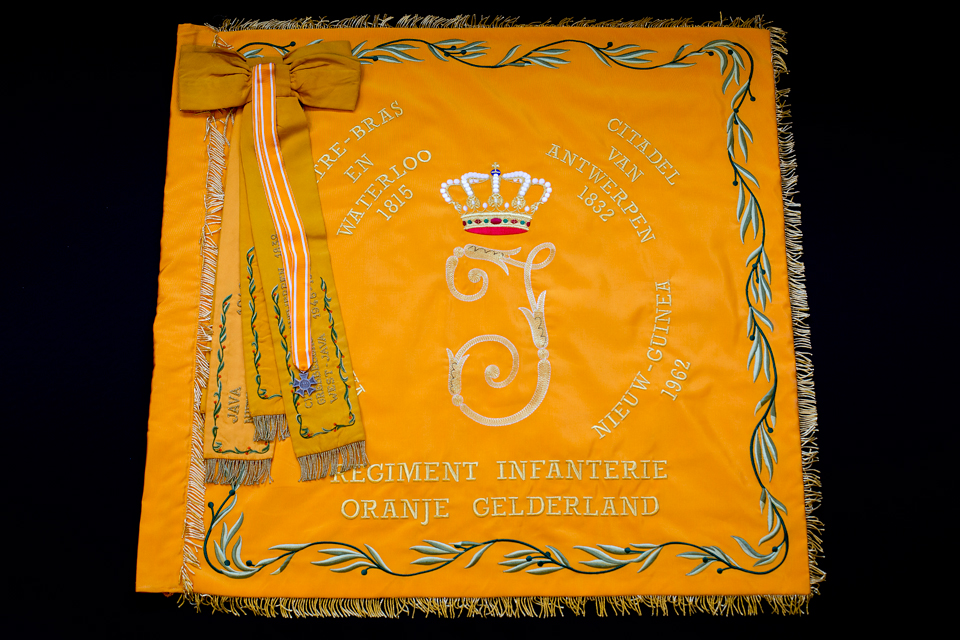
- Regiment Infanterie Oranje Gelderland flag
- Active: 1722 - present (with disruptions)
- Country: Netherlands
- Allegiance: 43 Gemechaniseerde Brigade
- Branch: Royal Netherlands Army
- Type: Mechanized Infantry
- Size: 1 battalion
- Garrison/HQ: Havelte
- Motto(s): Waakzaam en Stoutmoedig (Vigilant and Bold)
- March: Le Courageux
- Mascot(s): A-cie: Crocodile; B-cie: Lion; C-cie: Rooster; Staff: Peacock
- Anniversaries: 2nd day of Easter
- Equipment: CV90-35NL
- Decorations: Zilveren Kruis (commemorative medal for participation 1813-1815 Campaign)
- Battle honours: Quatre Bras 1815; Waterloo 1815; Citadel van Antwerpen 1832; Grebbeberg 1940; Java 1946-1949; West-Java 1946-1949; Nieuw-Guinea 1962; Sar Regin 2008

Commanders
- Current commander: Lt.col. Ouwehand
- Notable commanders: William IV, Prince of Orange

Insignia
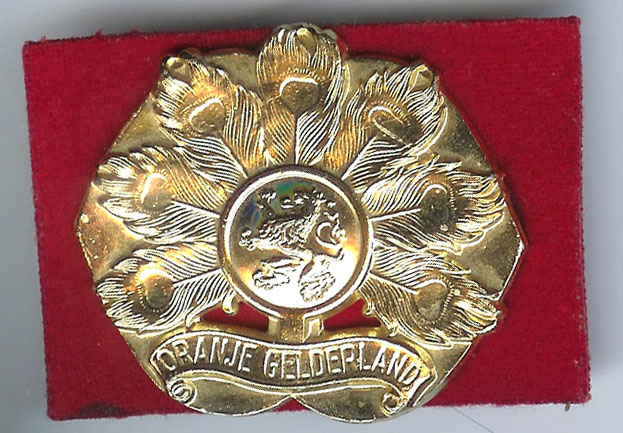
- Beret emblem of the 45 Painfbat RIOG

The Regiment Infanterie Oranje Gelderland is a mechanized infantry regiment of the Royal Netherlands Army. Re-established in 2006 it forms the mechanized infantry battalion 45 Painfbat RIOG. It operates the newly acquired CV90 Infantry fighting vehicle.

On Prinsjesdag 2013, it was announced that the 45th PIB RIOG would be disbanded due to defense cuts. However, the 2014 budget agreements indicated that disbanding was no longer planned.
