= Regiment Huzaren Prinses Catharina-Amalia =

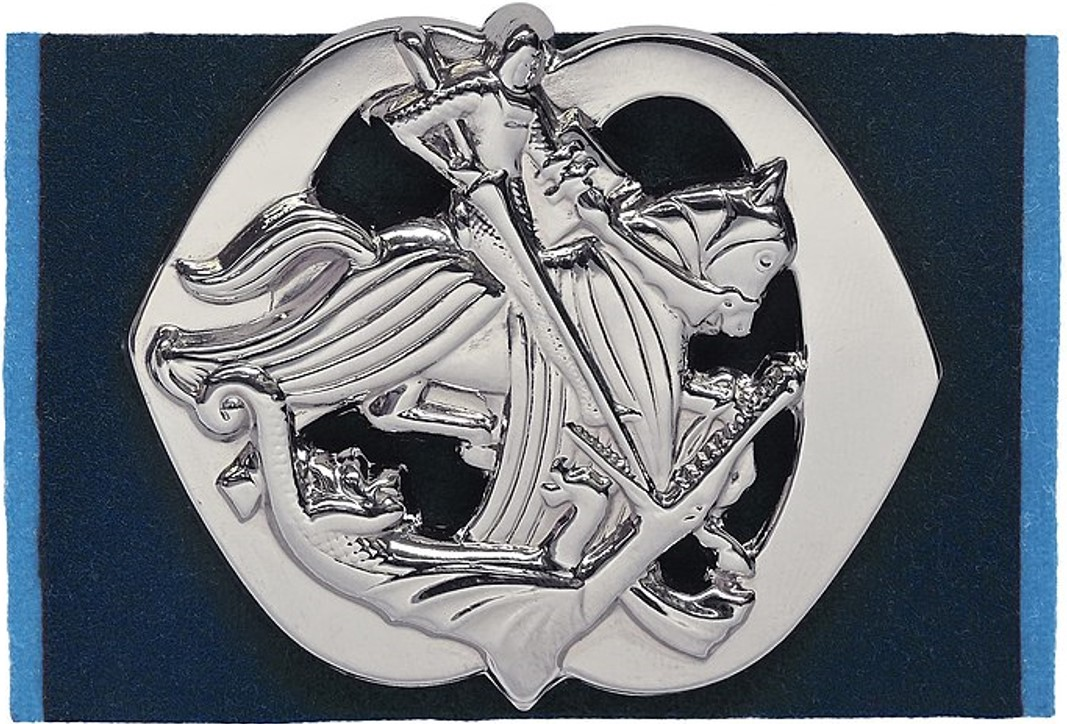
- Cap badge of the Regiment Huzaren Prinses Catharina-Amalia
- Active: 2020–present
- Country: Netherlands
- Branch: Royal Netherlands Army
- Type: Line cavalry
- Role: Armoured; Public duties
- Size: One regiment
- Part of: 43 Gemechaniseerde Brigade
- Garrison/HQ: Bergen-Lohheide
- Motto(s): Pro Rege, Lege et Grege (For King, Law and People)

The Regiment Huzaren Prinses Catharina-Amalia is a cavalry regiment of the Royal Netherlands Army. The regiment was formed in late 2020 through the amalgamation of three other Dutch cavalry regiments that, at the time, existed in suspension - the Regiment Huzaren Prins Alexander, Regiment Huzaren Van Sytzama and Regiment Huzaren Prins van Oranje. The new regiment took over the operation of the army's remaining main battle tanks, as well as two of the army's ceremonial units, the Cavalry Escort (Cavalerie Ere Escorte) and the Mounted Units Regimental Band (Regimentsfanfare Bereden Wapens).

== History ==
In November 2020, the Dutch Ministry of Defence announced the formation of a new armoured unit as part of a reorganisation of the army. This was an effort to restore a regimental structure to the three armoured regiments that had been placed in suspended animation following the disbanding of the army's force of main battle tanks between 2007 and 2012. In 2016, this capability was restored with the foundation of 414 Tank Battalion, a joint unit manned by both Dutch and German troops, with one of its three tank companies a Dutch unit. Upon its initial formation, this company was attached to the army's single remaining active armoured unit, the Regiment Huzaren Van Boreel, which operated primarily as a reconnaissance and ISTAR unit. As part of the army's reorganisation, the multiple operational roles undertaken by the van Boreel regiment were split - the ISTAR element was transferred to the newly established Intelligence & Security Corps (Korps Inlichtingen & Veiligheid "Prinses Alexia"), while the tank element was moved to a new armoured regiment formed through the amalgamation of the old Prins Alexander, van Sytzama and Prins van Oranje regiments. The purpose of forming a new regiment for the armoured element of the army was then to allow it to be used as the parent regiment for any potential future heavy armoured units, clearly delineating between the main battle tank and lighter, reconnaissance capability provided by the van Boreel regiment.

On 20 November 2020, King Willem-Alexander announced that the new armoured regiment would be named for his eldest daughter, Catharina-Amalia, Princess of Orange. The regiment will carry the standard of the Regiment Huzaren van Sytzama until it receives its own standard.

== Units ==
Upon formation, the regiment contained a total of three sub-units inherited from the Regiment Huzaren Van Boreel:

- 4th Tank Company, 414 Tank Battalion
- Cavalry Mounted Escort Squadron
- Mounted Units Regimental Band

The first of these is the operational element of the regiment, attached to the joint German/Dutch tank battalion stationed in Germany. The Cavalry Mounted Escort is the army's ceremonial mounted unit. The Mounted Units Regimental Band is the army's unique bicycle mounted band.

== Emblems ==
The regiment's cap badge is the standard silver cavalry cap badge, which features St George and the Dragon on the standard nassau blue cavalry background. The piping of the background is new regiment's own sky blue colour, which is the colour used by the old heavy cavalry. In a modern setting, the sky blue color refers to the steel of the tanks. This color would also have been the regimental color of the 1e Vechtwagenregiment planned in 1946, but which was never established.

== See also ==
- Regiment Huzaren Prinses Catharina-Amalia
- Cavalry Mounted Escort
