= Strong Europe Tank Challenge =

Annual army tank competition

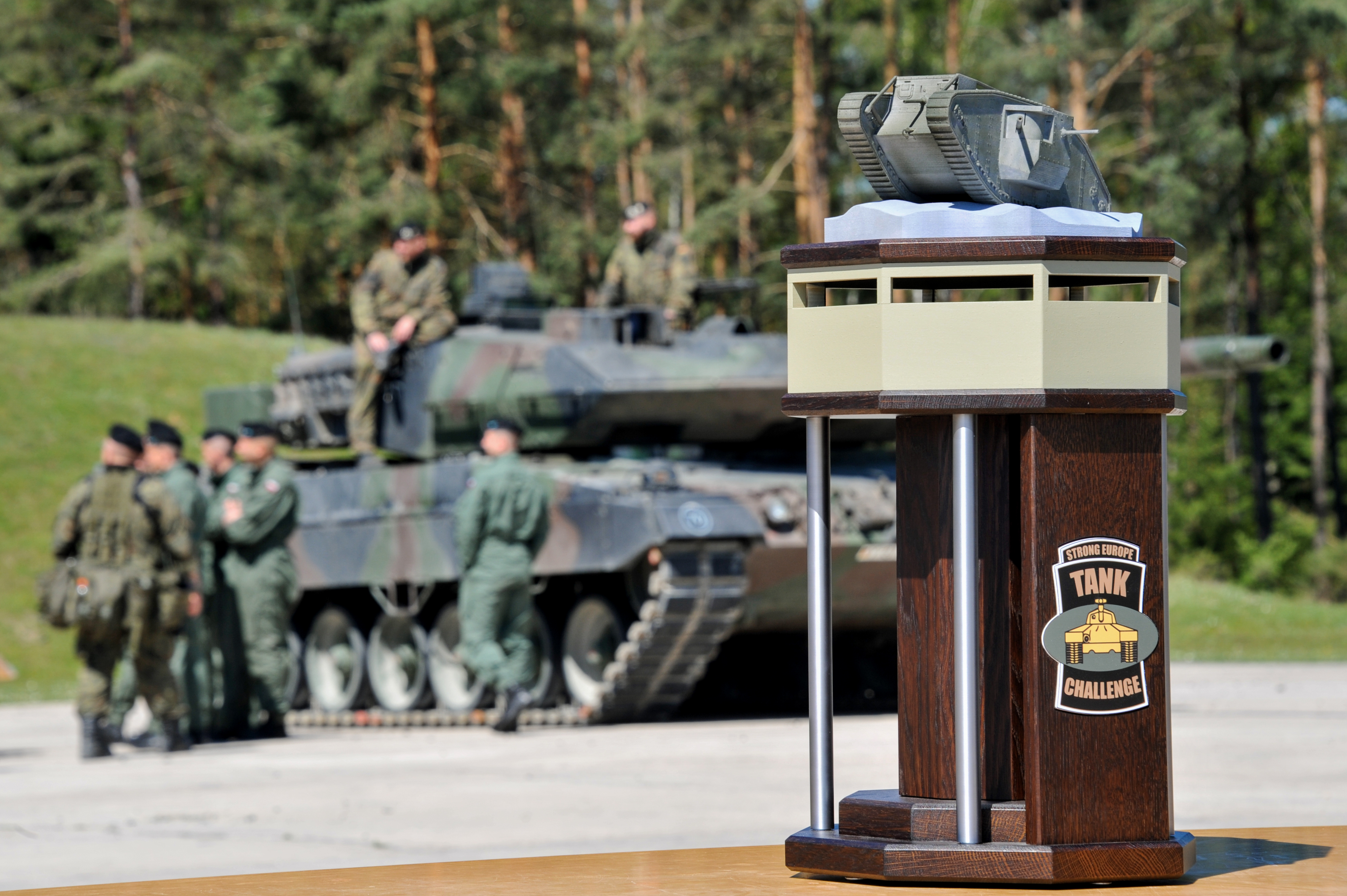
The SETC 2016 trophy, with a German Leopard 2A6 in the background.

The Strong Europe Tank Challenge was an annual, multinational tank platoon competition held from 2016 to 2018 at Grafenwöhr Training Area, Germany, and hosted by the U.S. Army Europe and the German Army. In February 2025 the competition was held again after a 7 year hiatus, although renamed to the U.S. Army Europe and Africa International Tank Challenge.

== Description ==
Crews from NATO and non-NATO partners compete in defensive/offensive mounted and dismounted operations. Platoons rotate throughout 12 events with 1,500 possible points in total. The first challenge was held in 2016, with Germany taking first place. The 2017 challenge saw Austria placing first, with Germany and the U.S. taking second and third, respectively.

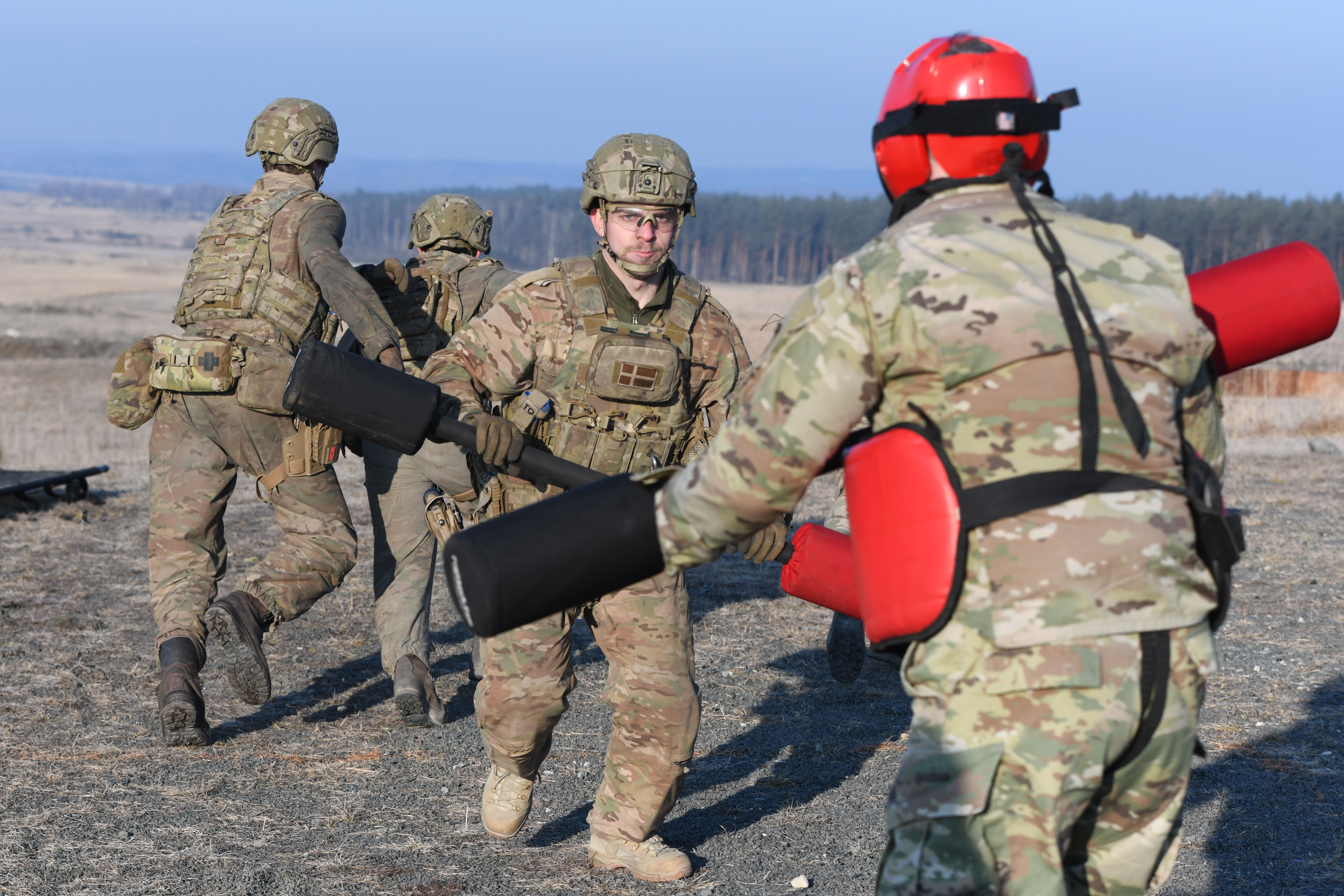
A Danish Army and U.S. Army tanker compete in a pugil stick fight during the 2025 competition.

== Results ==
=== 2016 ===
The 2016 competition was the first SETC competition. Denmark, Germany, Italy, Poland, Slovenia sent one platoon; the United States sent two. The Czech Republic planned to send a platoon, but the unit failed to arrive. No official place list for team behind the third place was published.

Place	Nation	Unit	Tank
1st	GER	C/ 3. Kompanie, GebirgsPanzerbataillon 8	Leopard 2A6
2nd	DEN	1/ 1st Squadron, 1st Panserbataljon	Leopard 2A5 DK
3rd	POL	1/ 1st Company, 1st Tank Battalion	Leopard 2A5
4th	ITA	1/ 2nd Company, 8th Tank Battalion	C1 Ariete
5th	USA	1/ D Company, 2-7 Infantry	M1A2 SEP v2
6th	USA	3/ C Company, 2-7 Infantry	M1A2 SEP v2
7th	SLO	Wolf/ 45th Center for Tracked Combat Vehicles	M-84

=== 2017 ===
The second annual competition included three newcomers, Austria, Ukraine and France. Italy, Denmark and Slovenia did not appear.

Place	Nation	Unit	Tank
1st	AUT	Panzerbataillon 14	Leopard 2A4
2nd	GER	2. Kompanie, Panzerbataillon 203	Leopard 2A6
3rd	USA	1st Battalion, 66th Armor Regiment "Iron Knights", 3rd Brigade Combat Team, 4th Infantry Division (Iron Brigade)	M1A2 SEP v2
4th	FRA	501e régiment de chars de combat, 3e escadron	Leclerc
5th	UKR		T-64BV
6th	POL		Leopard 2A5

=== 2018 ===
The third annual competition took place from June 3 to the 8th and included two newcomers: Sweden and the United Kingdom.

Place	Nation	Unit	Tank	Points
1st	GER	3. Kompanie, Panzerbataillon 393	Leopard 2A6	1450
2nd	SWE	Wartofta Tank Company, Skaraborg Regiment	Strv 122 (Leopard 2A5)	1411
3rd	AUT	KPE/PzB14	Leopard 2A4	1321
4th	FRA	1er régiment de chasseurs	Leclerc	1186
5th	POL	34th Armoured Cavalry Brigade	Leopard 2A5	1151
6th	UK	The Queen's Royal Hussars (The Queen's Own and Royal Irish)	Challenger 2	1140
7th	USA	2-70 Armor, 2nd Brigade, 1st Infantry Division	M1A2 SEP v2	1110
8th	UKR	14th Mechanized Brigade	T-84 Oplot	950

=== 2025 ===
The fourth competition took place in February 2025, with an American team taking first place. Tank crews from Denmark, Italy, Slovenia and Switzerland also attended the competition.

== Gallery ==
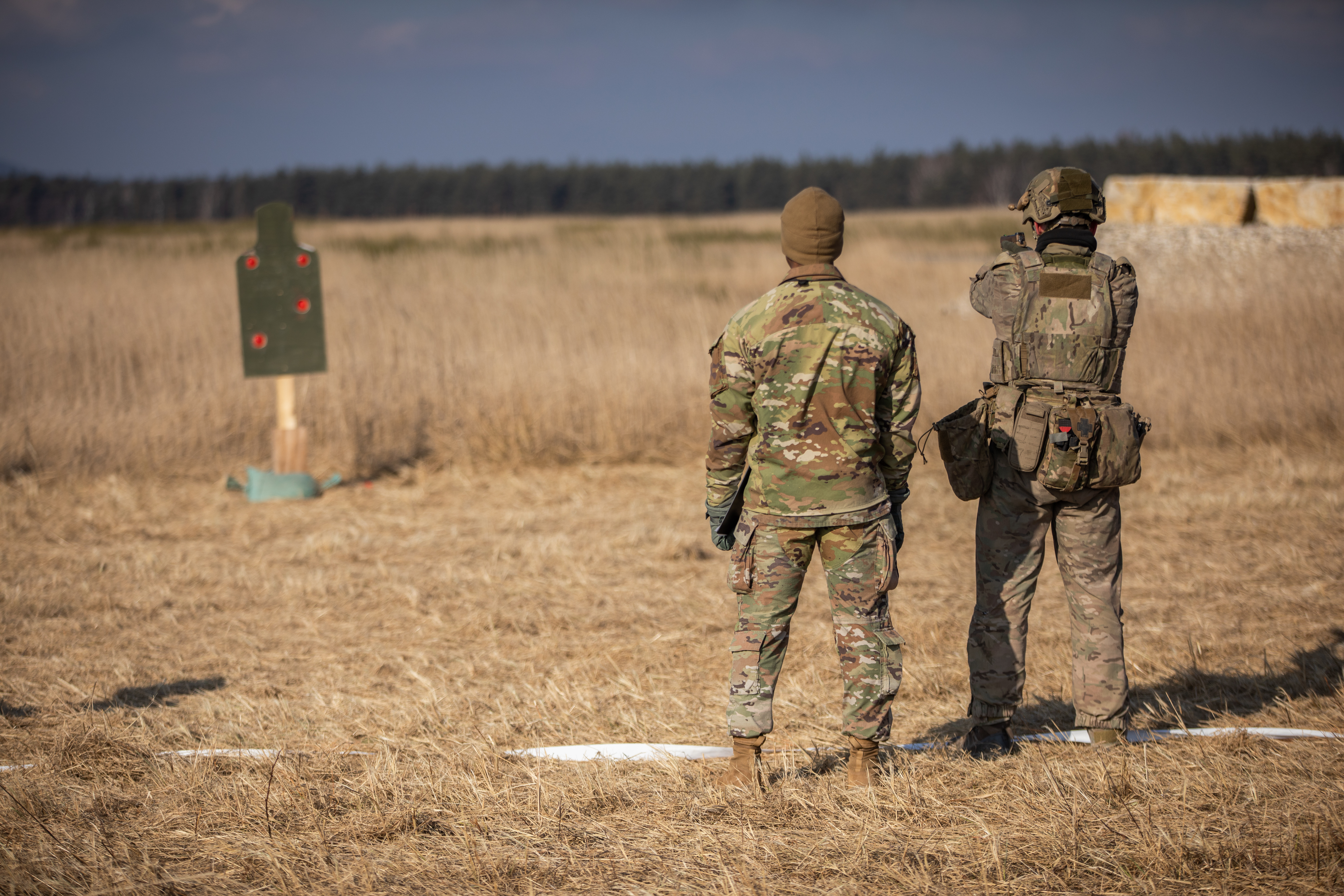
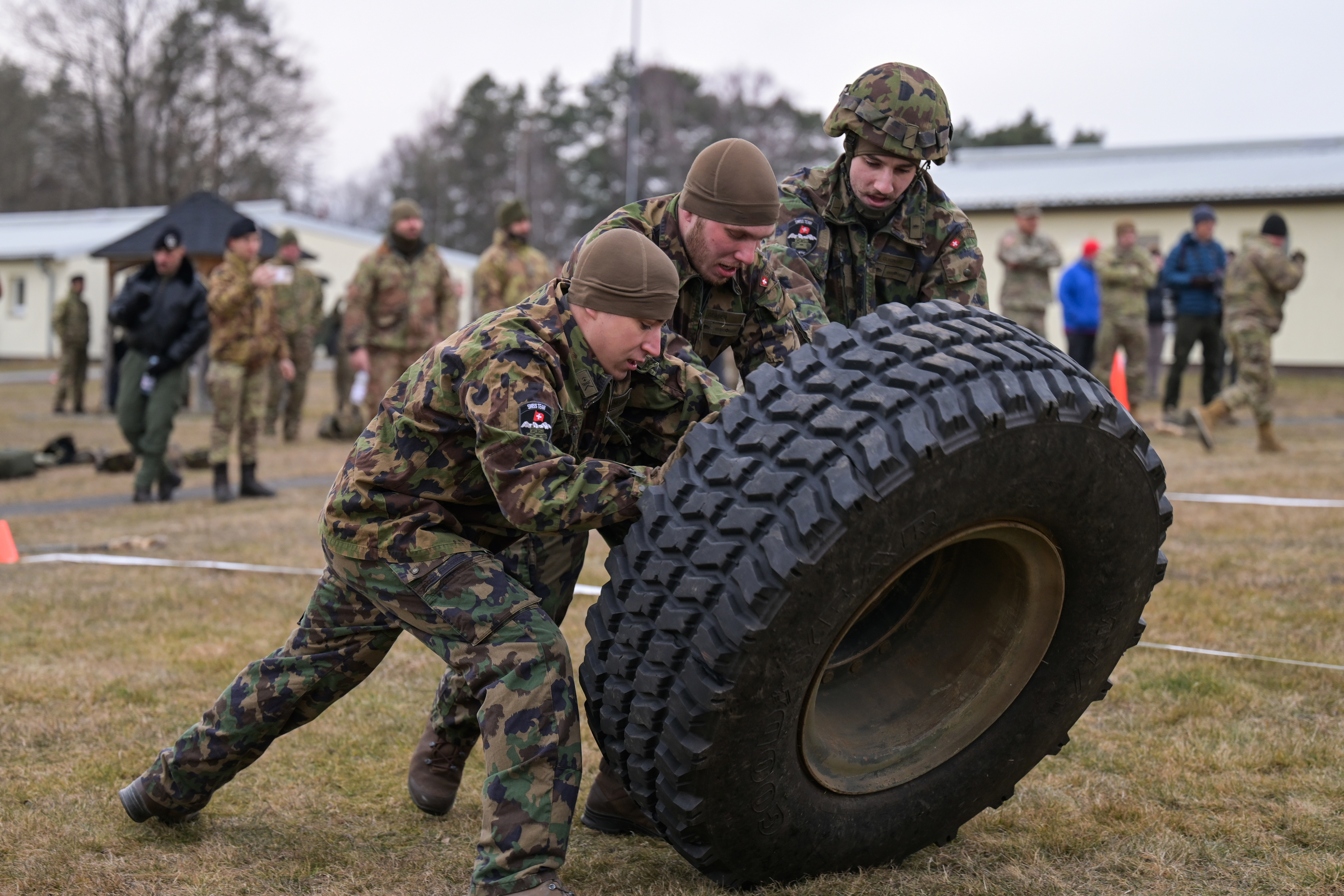
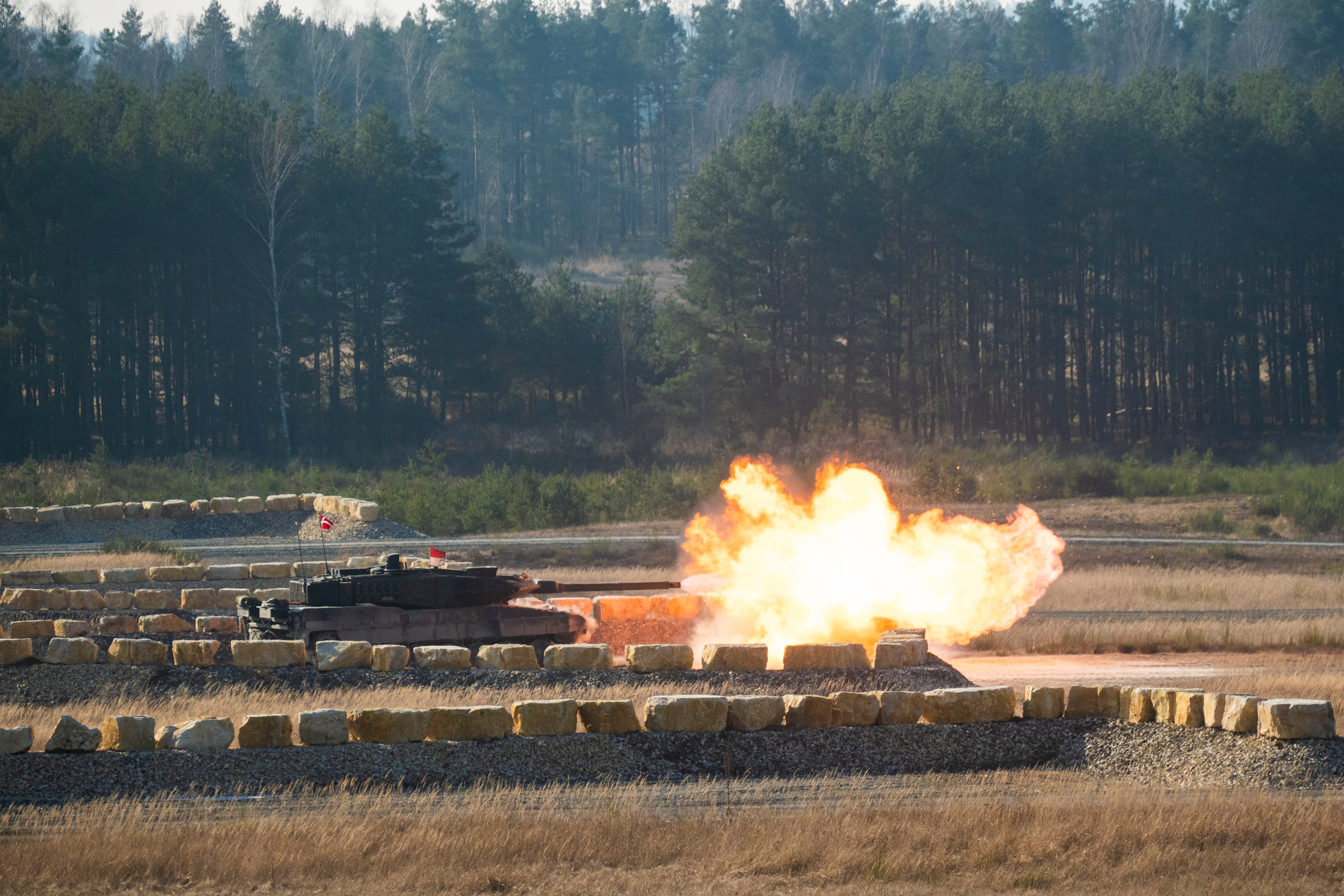

== See also ==
- Military exercise
- Canadian Army Trophy
- Worthington Trophy
- Tank biathlon
