= Regiment Huzaren van Sytzama =

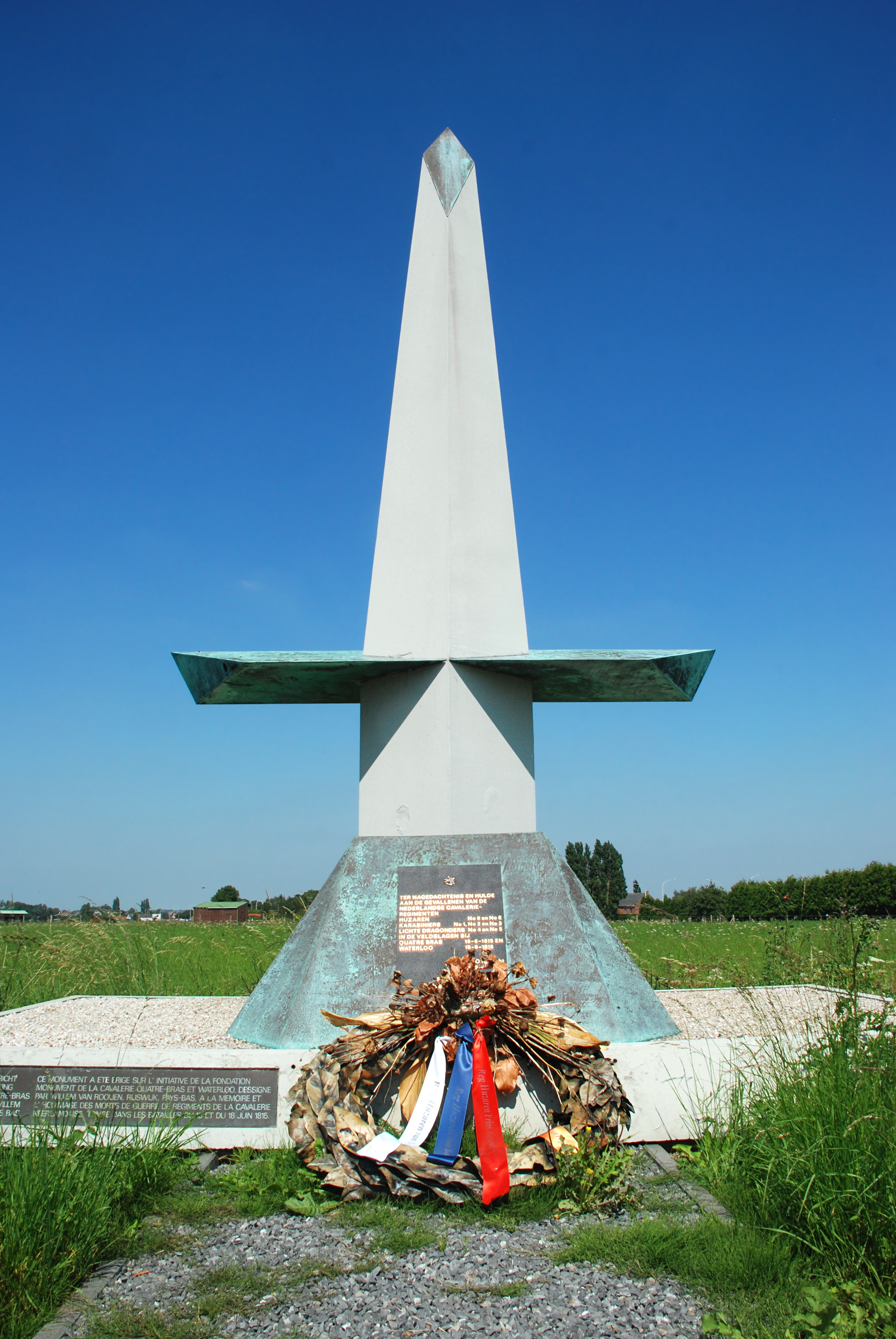
Monument to the Dutch Cavalry regiments in Quatre Bras (near Waterloo).

The Regiment Huzaren van Sytzama was a Dutch armored regiment named for J.G. Baron van Sytzama, which was disbanded in 2012. Its origins may be traced to the French 14th Regiment of Cuirassiers which had in turn been formed from the Dutch 2nd Regiment of Cuirassiers in 1810. From these men, the Baron raised the regiment, later styled 1e Regiment Huzaren.

The Regiment Huzaren Prinses Catharina-Amalia, which is a company in the 414th Panzer Battalion plus Cavalry Mounted Escort Squadron and Mounted Units Regimental Band, is a cavalry regiment formed in late 2020 through the amalgamation of three other Dutch cavalry regiments that, at the time, existed in suspension - the Regiment Huzaren Prins Alexander, Regiment Huzaren Van Sytzama and Regiment Huzaren Prins van Oranje.

== Tank Battalions ==
- 11th Tank Battalion which was activated on 6 January 1958, equipped with the British Centurion tank until August 1970, followed by the Leopard 1. In 1985 the Leopard 1V (improved) replaced the 1's. In 1993 the Leopard 1V was replaced by the Leopard 2A4. In April 1999 it was the last active user of the Leopard 2A4 and in that month it was replaced by the Leopard 2A5. In March 2004 the A5s were replaced with the Leopard 2A6. On 9 February 2012 the 11th tankbattalion was disbanded. It was based at Oirschot, North Brabant, the Netherlands
- 12th Tank Battalion was activated in October 1957. In 1971 it received the Leopard 1 and in December 1985 the first Leopard 2A4s arrived to replace the Leopard 1s. In 2000 the unit was disbanded.
- 43rd Tank Battalion was activated on 1 February 1963 at 't Harde, the Netherlands. in 1970 it received the first Leopard 1s. In July 1983 the unit received the Leopard 2A4. On 1 July 1992 the unit was disbanded at Langemannshof.
- 49th Tank Battalion which was activated on 1 October 1972. Initially operating the Leopard 1 and from 1986 the Leopard 1V (improved). The unit was deactivated/disbanded on 1 January 1994. Its last location was the mobilisation complex at Schaarsbergen, the Netherlands.
