= Regiment Huzaren Prins Alexander =

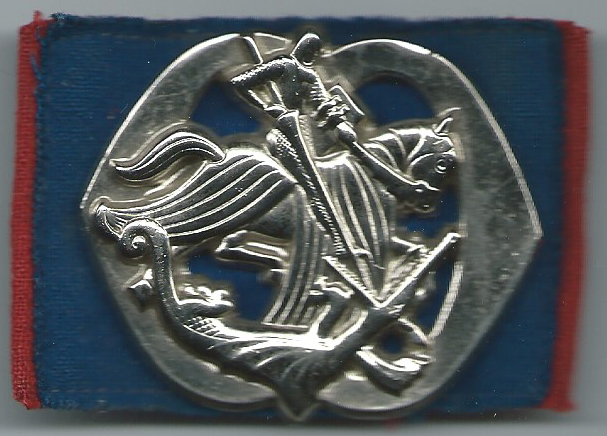
- Active: 1814–present
- Country: Netherlands
- Branch: Royal Netherlands Army
- Type: Armoured corps

The Regiment Huzaren Prins Alexander is an Armoured corps of the Royal Netherlands Army, named after Prince Alexander, the second son of King Willem II. This regiment represented the former 3rd Hussars Regiment, formed in 1814 (origins date back to 1672). It was known as the Red (because of the red colour on their uniform) or Guards Hussars, but was never a Guards regiment.

The Regiment Huzaren Prinses Catharina-Amalia, which is a company in the 414th Panzer Battalion plus Cavalry Mounted Escort Squadron and Mounted Units Regimental Band, is a cavalry regiment formed in late 2020 through the amalgamation of three other Dutch cavalry regiments that, at the time, existed in suspension – the Regiment Huzaren Prins Alexander, Regiment Huzaren Van Sytzama and Regiment Huzaren Prins van Oranje.

== Tank battalions of the Regiment Hussars Prince Alexander ==
41st Tank Battalion — Activated on June 1, 1953, and based at Hohne Camp, Germany. The unit operated the Leopard 1 from 1971 to 1984. In 1983 (or 1985), it received its first Leopard 2A4 tanks, which remained in service until April 1994. The battalion was disbanded on August 1, 1994.

42nd Tankbattalion – Before 1991 42 Tkbat was part of the Regiment Hussars Prince Alexander. The unit was activated on April 1, 1972, and operated with the Leopard 1 until July 1985. From that moment the Leopard 1s were replaced by the Leopard 2A4. In 1991 the unit became part of the Regiment Hussars Prince of Orange.

52nd Tankbattalion – Activated on May 1, 1987, at the mobilization complex Soesterberg and equipped with the Leopard 1V. In 1992 the Leopard 1V were replaced by the Leopard 2A4 and on February 1, 1994, the unit was disbanded.

57th Tankbattalion – Located at the mobilization complex Wilp and equipped with the Leopard 2A4 from 1986 – July 1, 1992. On July 1, 1992, the unit was disbanded.

58th Tankbattalion – Activated in December 1973 and located at mobilization-complex Wijchen. The unit was equipped with the Leopard 1V from 1986 – 1992. The unit was disbanded on January 1, 1994.

101st Tankbattalion – Activated on October 15, 1957. Before the Leopard it was equipped with the Centurion tank. In November 1984 these Centurions were replaced by the Leopard 1V. From February 1992 – 1998 the unit was equipped with the Leopard 2A4.In 1998 the A4s were replaced by the A5 and from February 2003 the A6 replaced the A5s. The unit was activated at Soesterberg, then moved to Seedorf and then disbanded on December 20, 2005. 101 Tkbat was disbanded and the two companies of the battalion were split up between 11th Tkbat and 42nd tankbat where they became the 3rd company (C Squadron).
