= 2/4th Lancers Regiment =

Belgian military unit (1994–2010)

2/4 Regiment Lansiers
- Active: 1994 - 2010; 2 September 2025 — present
- Country: Belgium
- Branch: Belgian Army
- Type: Cavalry
- Role: Armoured
- Part of: 1st Brigade
- Garrison/HQ: Leopoldsburg
- Mottos: Meurs premier, comme devant/Quatre lances, pas de quartier
- Battle honours: Campaign 1914-1918; Liège-Halen-Antwerp; Beveren (Roeselare); Wippelgem; The Gete; Zwijndrecht; The Lys

The 2/4th Lancers Regiment (Dutch: 2/4 Regiment Lansiers) is a cavalry regiment in the Belgian Army of the Belgian Armed Forces. It was created by the merging of the 2nd Lancers and the 4th Lancers Regiments. The regiment was the Armoured Battalion of the 1st Brigade. The 2/4th was inactivated in 2010, and the 1/3rd Lancers Battalion became the Armoured Battalion of the 1st Brigade.

The Regiment was reactivated on 2 September 2025.

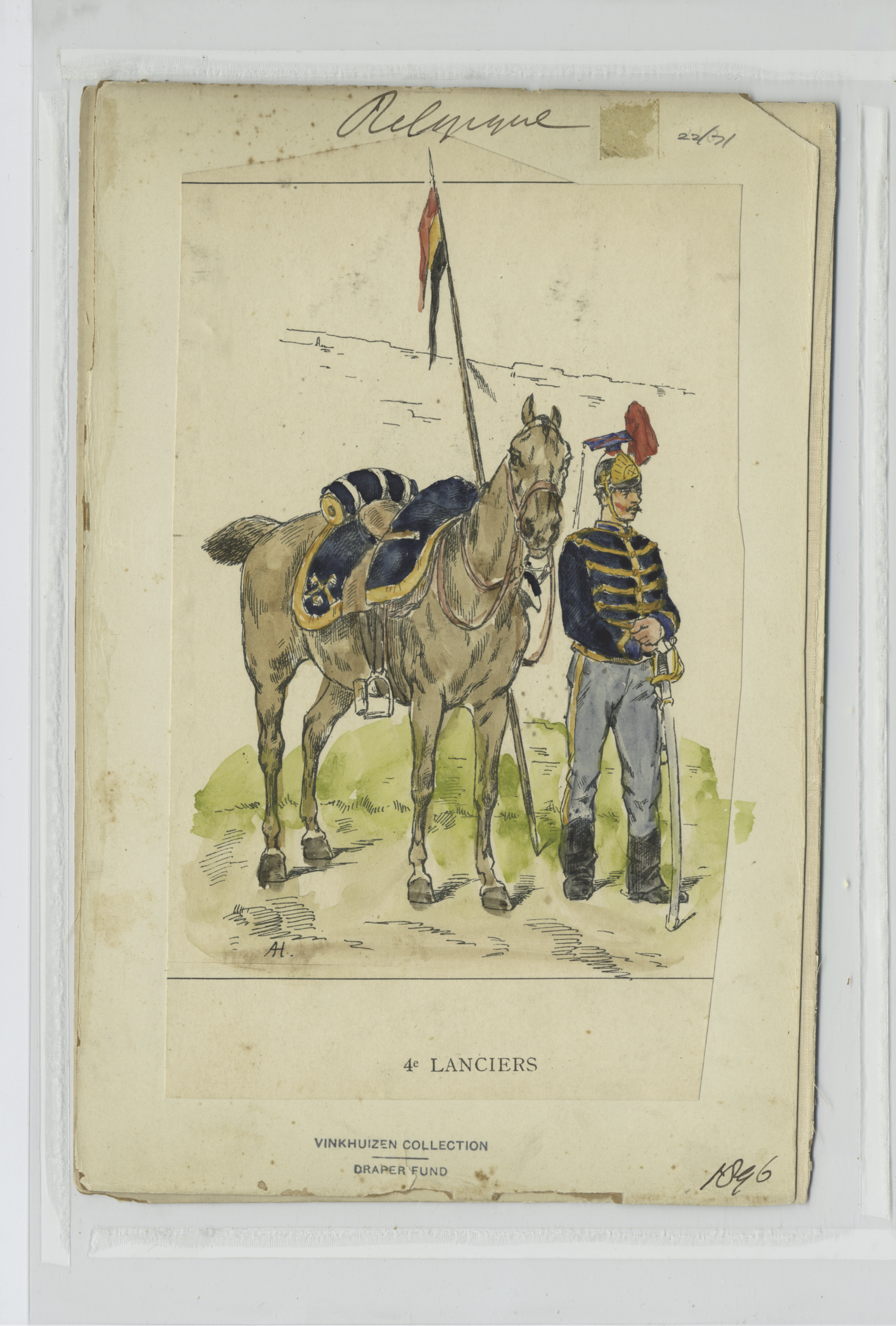
A soldier of the 4th Lancers, circa 1896

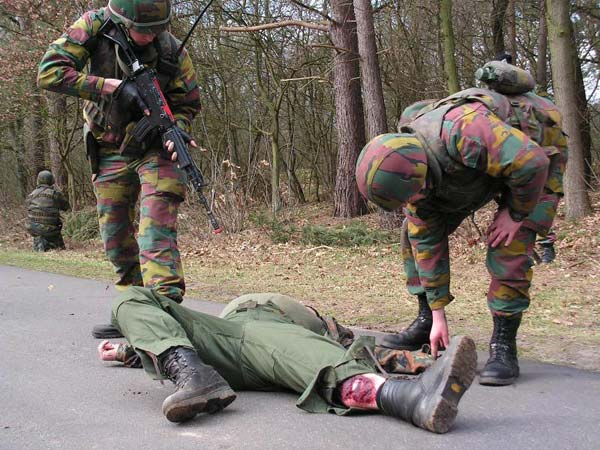
Soldiers from the 2/4th Lancers, 2006
