= 43rd Mechanized Brigade (Netherlands) =

43 Mechanised Brigade
- 43 Mechanised Brigade insignia
- Active: July 1949–present
- Country: Netherlands
- Branch: Royal Netherlands Army
- Type: Mechanised Infantry
- Size: 3,500 active personnel; 1,000 reservists
- Garrison/HQ: Johannes Post Kazerne, Havelte
- Colors: Red & Blue
- Mascot: Bison
- Engagements: War in Afghanistan

Commanders
- Current commander: Brigadier General Nico Boom

Insignia
NATO Map Symbol
43
1

43 Mechanised Brigade (Dutch: 43 Gemechaniseerde Brigade) is one of the three combat brigades of the Royal Netherlands Army, the others being the 13th Light Brigade and 11th Airmobile Brigade. The brigade has armored and non-armored vehicles at its disposal, and is tasked with conducting combat operations, peacekeeping and various ceremonial tasks.

On 17 March 2016, the 43rd Mechanised Brigade was integrated into the 1st Panzer Division of the German Army. At the same time, the German 414 Tank Battalion became subordinate to the 43rd Mechanised Brigade. In this battalion one of the four companies is manned by Dutch personnel equipped with 18 German Leopard 2A6 main battle tanks.

The Brigades Headquarters as well as most of the units are located at the Johannes Post Barracks in Havelte, in the province Drenthe.

== Organization ==
As of March 2025 the 43 Mechanized Brigade consists the following units:

- 43 Mechanized Brigade (43 Gemechaniseerde Brigade), in Havelte
  - 43 Staff Company (43 Stafcompagnie), in Havelte
  - 44 Armored Infantry Battalion "Regiment Infanterie Johan Willem Friso" (44 Pantserinfanteriebataljon "Regiment Infanterie Johan Willem Friso"), in Havelte
    - A, B, C and D Company, with CV9035NL MLU infantry fighting vehicles
  - 45 Armored Infantry Battalion "Regiment Infanterie Oranje Gelderland" (45 Pantserinfanteriebataljon "Regiment Infanterie Oranje Gelderland"), in Havelte (Will move to Soesterberg in 2027)
    - A, B, C and D Company, with CV9035NL MLU infantry fighting vehicles
  - 414 Tank Battalion "Regiment Huzaren Prinses Catharina-Amalia" (414 Tankbataljon "Regiment Huzaren Prinses Catharina-Amalia", mixed German Army and Royal Netherlands Army unit), in Bergen (Germany)
    - 1st Staff and Support Squadron (1e Staf- en verzorgingseskadron)
    - 2nd (German), 3rd (German), 4th (Dutch) and 5th (Reserve) (German) Tank Squadron, with Leopard 2A7 main battle tanks
  - 10 Infantry Battalion (10 Infanteriebataljon) National Reserve Corps, in Assen
    - Alpha Company (Alfa-compagnie), in Assen, Zoutkamp, and Leeuwarden
    - Bravo Company (Bravo-compagnie), in Assen and Havelte
    - Charlie Company (Charlie-compagnie), in Wezep and Bathmen
    - Delta Company (Delta-compagnie), in Amersfoort
    - Echo Company (Echo-compagnie), in Amersfoort
    - Foxtrot Company (Foxtrot-compagnie), in Enschede and Eibergen
  - 11 Armored Engineer Battalion (11 Pantsergeniebataljon), in Wezep
    - Staff Company
    - 111 and 112 Armored Engineer Company (111, 112 Pantsergeniecompagnie)
    - Multi Role Engineer Company
  - 43 Brigade Reconnaissance Squadron "Regiment Huzaren van Boreel" (43 43 Brigade Verkenningseskadron "Regiment Huzaren van Boreel"), in Havelte, with Fennek reconnaissance vehicles
  - 43 Medical Company (43 Geneeskundige Compagnie), in Havelte
  - 43 Maintenance Company (43 Herstelcompagnie), in Havelte and Wezep

Before the end of this decade, a second tank battalion with three Leopard 2A8 tank companies and combat service support elements will be raised. 11 Horse Artillery Battalion with two PzH2000 howitzer batteries and one PULS rocket artillery battery will join the brigade within the next few years, as well as additional intelligence, engineer, medical and supply elements.
