= 1/3rd Lancers Battalion =

1st/3rd Lancers Battalion
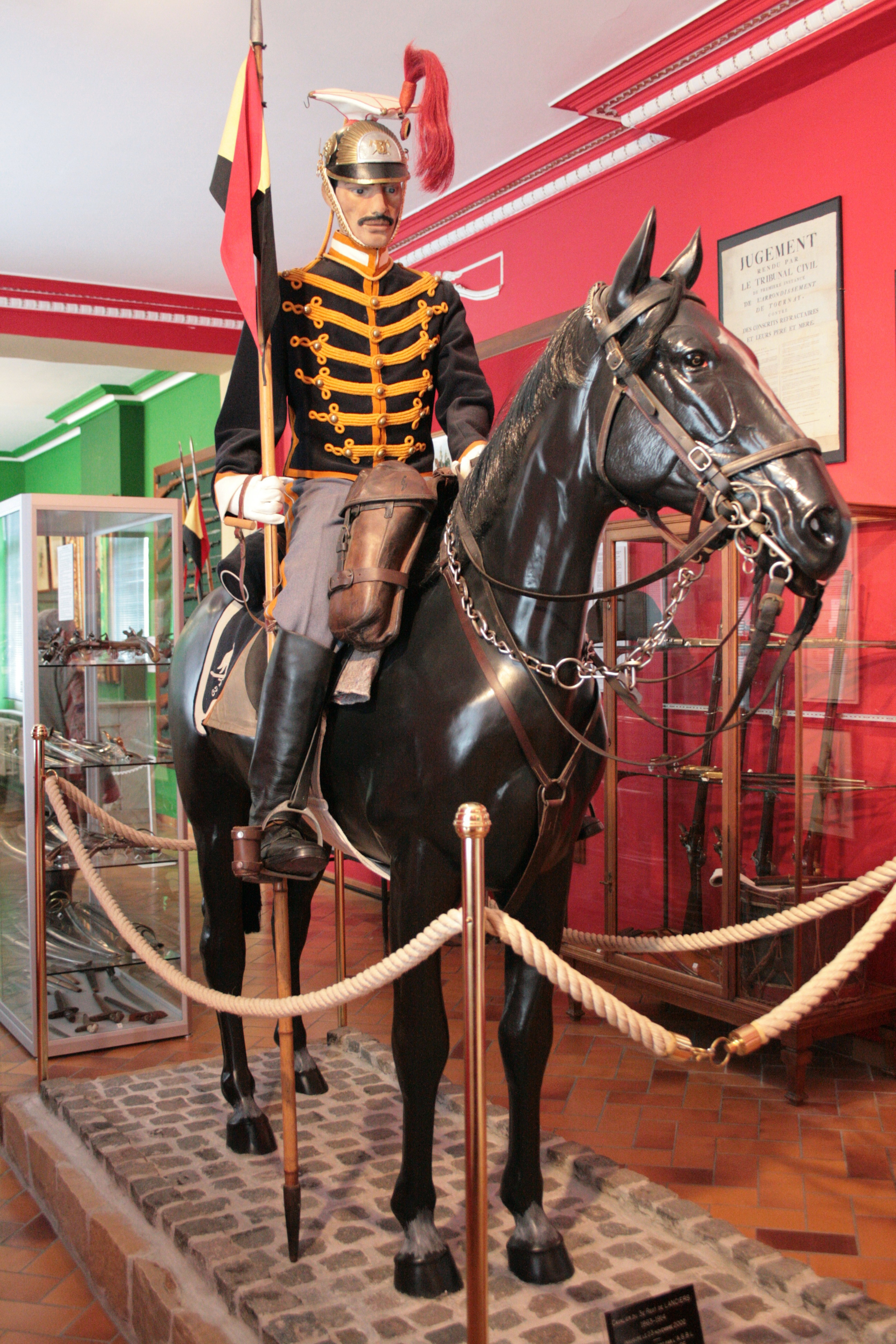
- Uniform of the 3rd Lancers, c. 1883–1914
- Active: 12 September 2003
- Country: Belgium
- Branch: Belgian Land Component
- Type: Infantry
- Role: motorized infantry
- Part of: Motorized Brigade
- Garrison/HQ: Marche-en-Famenne
- Motto: Vailant de la burch (Valiant of the Burch)
- Mascot: Tiger

Commanders
- Current commander: Lieutenant Colonel Dourte

The 1st/3rd Lancers Battalion (French: 1/3 Bataillon de Lanciers) is an infantry battalion in the Belgian Army of the Belgian armed forces. It is an amalgamation of the former 1st Lancers Regiment and the 3rd Lancers Regiment which has been re-roled to an infantry battalion but maintains cavalry customs and traditions. The battalion is a motorized infantry unit of the Motorized Brigade. The amalgamated unit served in Kosovo. It will again be reoriented towards a light cavalry role when the Jaguar vehicles are delivered.

== Organisation ==
The 1st/3rd Lancers Battalion comprises:

- HQ staff
- A (Red) Squadron
- B (Black) Squadron
- C (Blue) Squadron
- D (Green) Operational Reserve Squadron
- Service (Yellow) Squadron
