= Worthington Trophy =

Military award

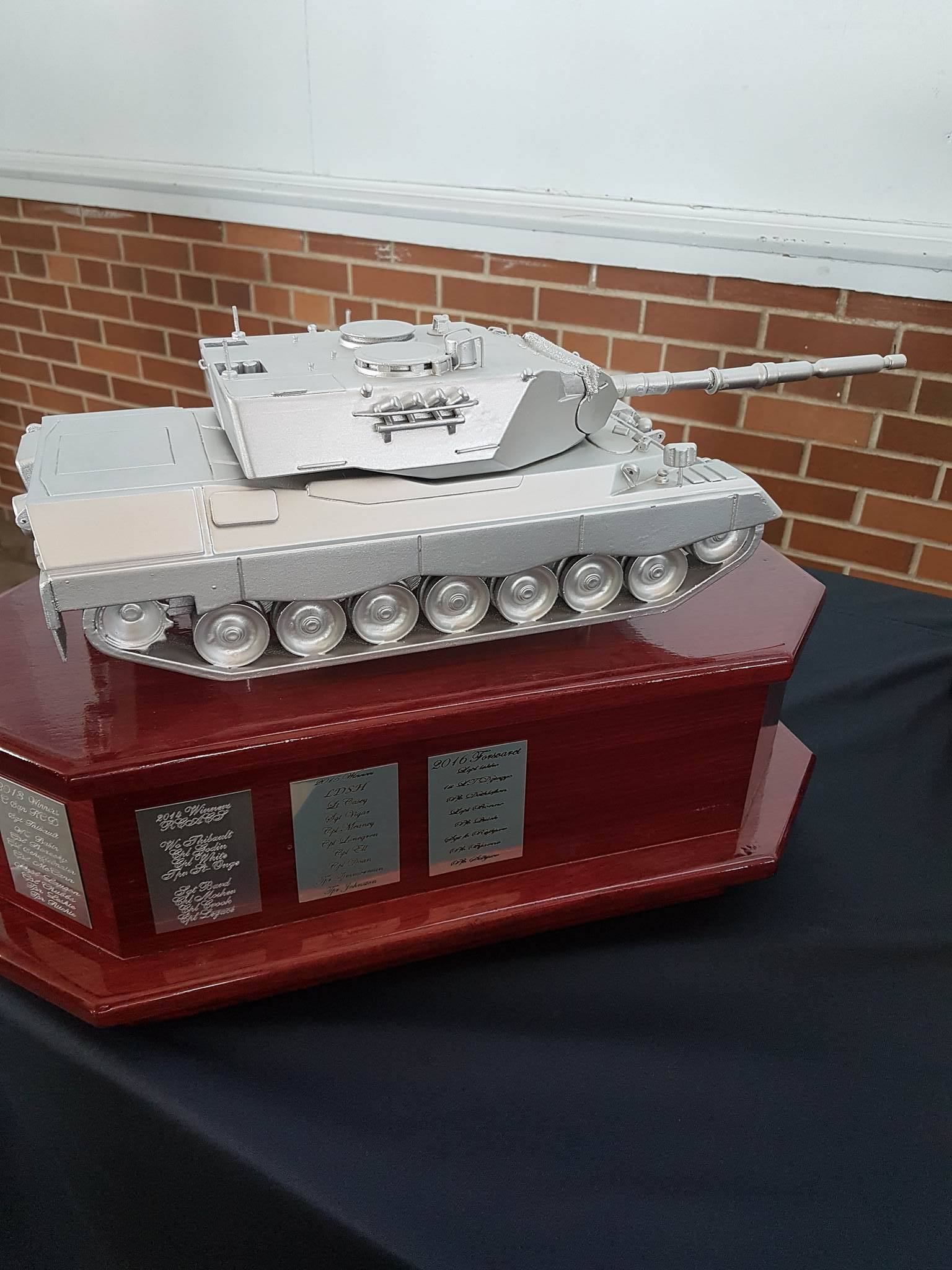
The WTC 2016 trophy

The Worthington Trophy is a Canadian military award. It was awarded annually to the best reserve armoured unit in the Canadian Land Forces. It is named after Major-General F. F. Worthington, known as Fighting Frank – "The Father of the Royal Canadian Armoured Corps".

Of its origins, Sean Maloney stated:

Another mechanism created to generate closer contact between the regular regiments and the Militia was the Worthington Trophy recce competition. Militia regiments from across the country participated by sending a troop. The winning regiment of the competition then sent that troop to train with a regular regiment's recce squadron. This allowed Militia regiments to gain some expertise with Lynx vehicles and their armament. In later years, the Worthington Trophy winners completed their training on Lynx and were then flown to West Germany to augment 4 CMBG's recce squadron during FALLEX.

The competition and award was not given out on a regular annual basis, and there have been some gaps in the timeline, especially recently. After a long gap, the Royal Canadian Armoured Corps School reintroduced the competition (now called the Worthington Challenge) in 2012 and it is now for regular force units. Although the origin for this event was a tank gunnery concentration, the scope was widened to include the 25 mm platform and allow non-armoured units to participate. The concentration was broken into two categories: Leopard 1 C2 (105 mm) and LAV III (25 mm). The original trophy design, being a large silver Centurion tank has been replaced with a likeness of a Leopard 1.

The 8th Canadian Hussars (Princess Louise's) have won the trophy 8 times, the most of any Canadian armoured regiment.

Tank units from the US Army have participated, specifically in 2001 and 2014.

== 2014 ==
The Royal Canadian Armoured Corps School (RCACS) successfully concluded its 3rd annual Exercise Worthington Challenge in Gagetown, New Brunswick, in October 2014.

The US Army 3rd Squadron, 1st Cavalry Regiment, 3rd Armored Brigade Combat Team, 3rd Infantry Division (United States), sent two M1A2 crews and two M2A3 crews in 2014.

== 2015 ==
Exercise Worthington 15 was held at CFB Gagetown in September.

The competitors were:

- Infantry School
- The Royal Canadian Armoured Corps School
- 4 Engineer Support Regiment
- 2nd Battalion, The Royal Canadian Regiment
- 1st and 2nd Battalions, Royal 22^{e} Régiment
- 1st and 2nd Battalion of Princess Patricia's Canadian Light Infantry
- Lord Strathcona's Horse (Royal Canadians)
- 12^{e} Régiment blindé du Canada
- Royal Canadian Dragoons
- 3rd Squadron, 1st Cavalry Regiment, 3rd Armored Brigade Combat Team, 3rd Infantry Division (United States)
- 2nd Battalion, 69th Armor Regiment, 3rd Armored Brigade Combat Team, 3rd Infantry Division (United States)

"A tough Danish team, fresh off a strong showing at this year's Nordic Challenge competed directly while other nations such as Brazil, Portugal and Chile observed the event."

"The 3rd Canadian Division team consisted of two Leopard 2 tank crews and two Coyote reconnaissance vehicle crews from Lord Strathcona's Horse (Royal Canadians), a Light Armour Vehicle (LAV) 3 crew from 1 Princess Patricia's Canadian Light Infantry, and two LUVW reconnaissance crews from the Saskatchewan Dragoons ... the tank team from Lord Strathcona's Horse (Royal Canadians) took the first place trophy for the 120 mm gunnery category, and the LAV 3 crew from the 1 Princess Patricia's Canadian Light Infantry took second place trophy for the 25 mm gunnery category."

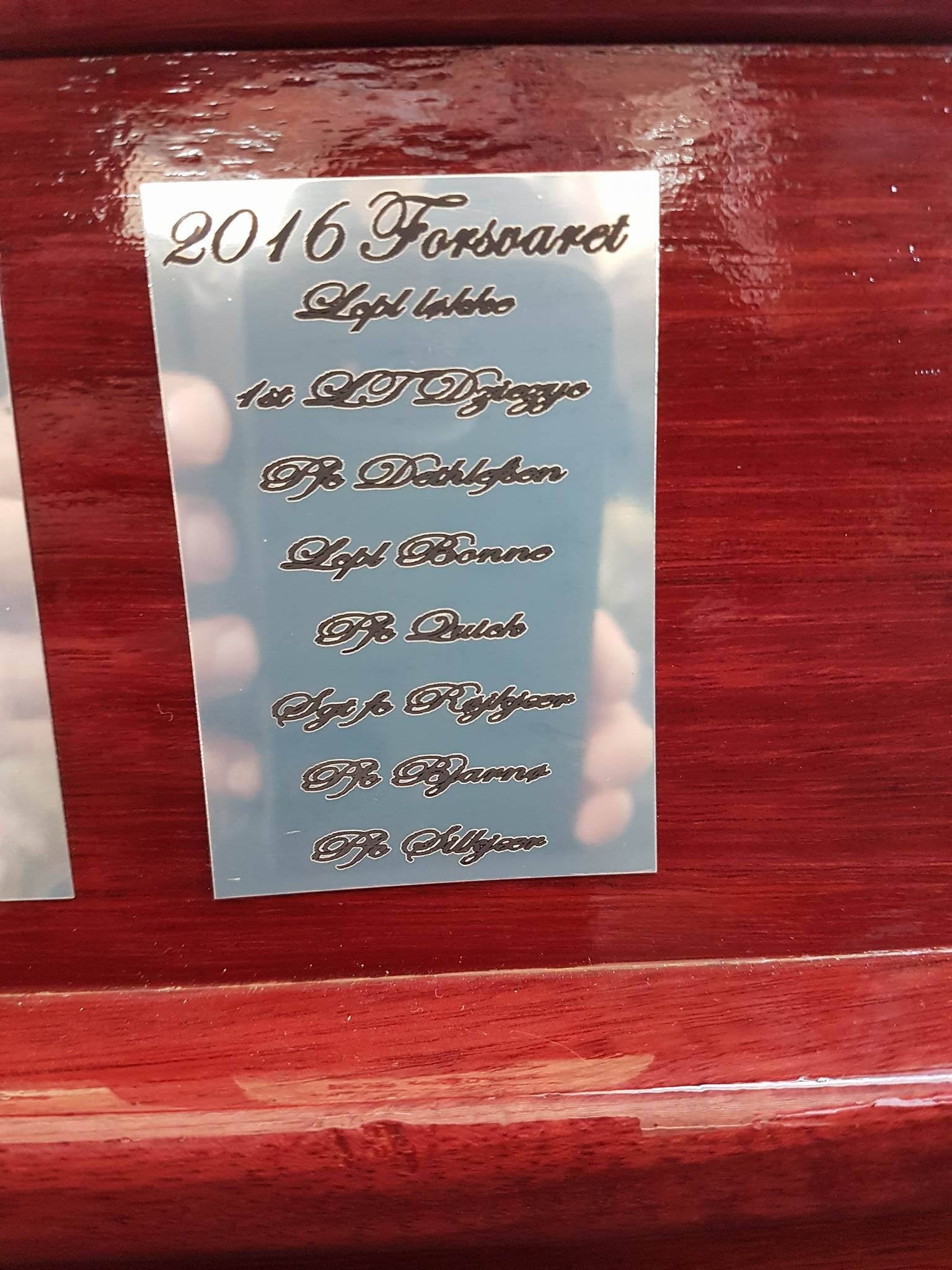
The 2016 trophy plaque, featuring the names of the winning fireteam in the 120 mm category.

== 2016 ==
Exercise Worthington 16 was held at CFB Gagetown in September 23 to 30.

"The exercise will test a number of skills including direct-fire gunnery, tactical driving, and teamwork tests in challenging settings using the Leopard 2 main battle tank, Light Armoured Vehicle III and 6, and the Coyote Armoured Vehicle. Competing nations include: Chile, Denmark, New Zealand, the United States, and Canada. Observing nations will be: Australia, Poland, and the United Kingdom." Canada was represented by C Sqn of The Royal Canadian Dragoons.

Top Light Utility Vehicle Wheeled (LUVW) Fire Team:

- Winner: 4 Div (combined crews of soldiers from the 1st Hussars, Windsor Regiment, and Ontario Regiment) with a total percentage score of 62.47%
- 2nd place: 2 Div - score of 58.97%
- 3rd place: 5 Div/CADTC (Canadian Army Doctrine and Training Centre) - score of 55.76%

Top 25 mm Crew:

- Winner: 4 Div Crew 2 - score of 67.27%
- 2nd place: New Zealand Crew 1 - score of 61.88%
- 3rd place: 2 Div Crew 2 - score of 60.86%

Top 120 mm Fire Team:

- Winner: Jutland Dragoon Regiment, Royal Danish Army - score of 66.93%
- 2nd place: 4 Div - score of 57.50%
- 3rd place: United States Army: Charlie Company, 1-252nd Armor Regiment, 30th Armored Brigade Combat Team, North Carolina Army National Guard - score of 56.34%

Worthington Challenge Cup (Top Canadian Div Team):

- Winner: 4 Div (Royal Canadian Dragoons, Royal Canadian Horse Artillery, 1st Hussars, Windsor Regiment, Ontario Regiment, and Queen Alexandra's Mounted Rifles) - score of 59.04%
- 2nd Place: 2 Div - score of 56.78%
- 3rd place: 3 Div - score of 46.80%
- 4th place = 5 Div/CADTC (Canadian Army Doctrine and Training Centre) - score of 43.17%

== Winners ==
Year	Winner	Ref
1954	19th Alberta Dragoons	
1956	19th Alberta Dragoons; 8th Canadian Hussars (Princess Louise's)	
1960	19th Alberta Dragoons; The Royal Canadian Hussars (Montreal); 8th Canadian Hussars (Princess Louise's)	
1962	South Alberta Light Horse	
1963	The Elgin Regiment	
1967	1st Hussars; 12^{e} Régiment blindé du Canada Milice	
1970	The British Columbia Regiment (Duke of Connaught's Own)	
1971	The Elgin Regiment	
1974	The Prince Edward Island Regiment	
1975	The Prince Edward Island Regiment	
1976	The Prince Edward Island Regiment	
1977	The British Columbia Dragoons	
1979	Le Régiment de Hull (RCAC)	
1981	12^{e} Régiment blindé du Canada Milice	
1983	The British Columbia Regiment (Duke of Connaught's Own)	
1984	The British Columbia Regiment (Duke of Connaught's Own); 8th Canadian Hussars (Princess Louise's)	
1985	The British Columbia Regiment (Duke of Connaught's Own)	
1986	The Royal Canadian Hussars (Montreal)	
1987	The Royal Canadian Hussars (Montreal)	
1988	The King's Own Calgary Regiment (RCAC)	
1989	The Royal Canadian Hussars (Montreal)	
1990	The Windsor Regiment (RCAC)	
1991	1st Hussars	
1992	8th Canadian Hussars (Princess Louise's)	
1993	8th Canadian Hussars (Princess Louise's)	
1994	8th Canadian Hussars (Princess Louise's)	
1995	The Ontario Regiment (RCAC)	
1996	The Elgin Regiment	
2012	Royal Canadian Armoured Corps School	
2013	C Squadron, The Royal Canadian Dragoons	
2014	12^{e} Régiment blindé du Canada teamed with Royal 22nd Regiment	
2015	3rd Canadian Division	
2016	4th Canadian Division	
2017	2nd Canadian Division	
