= 414 Tank Battalion =

- Panzerbataillon 414; 414 Tankbataljon
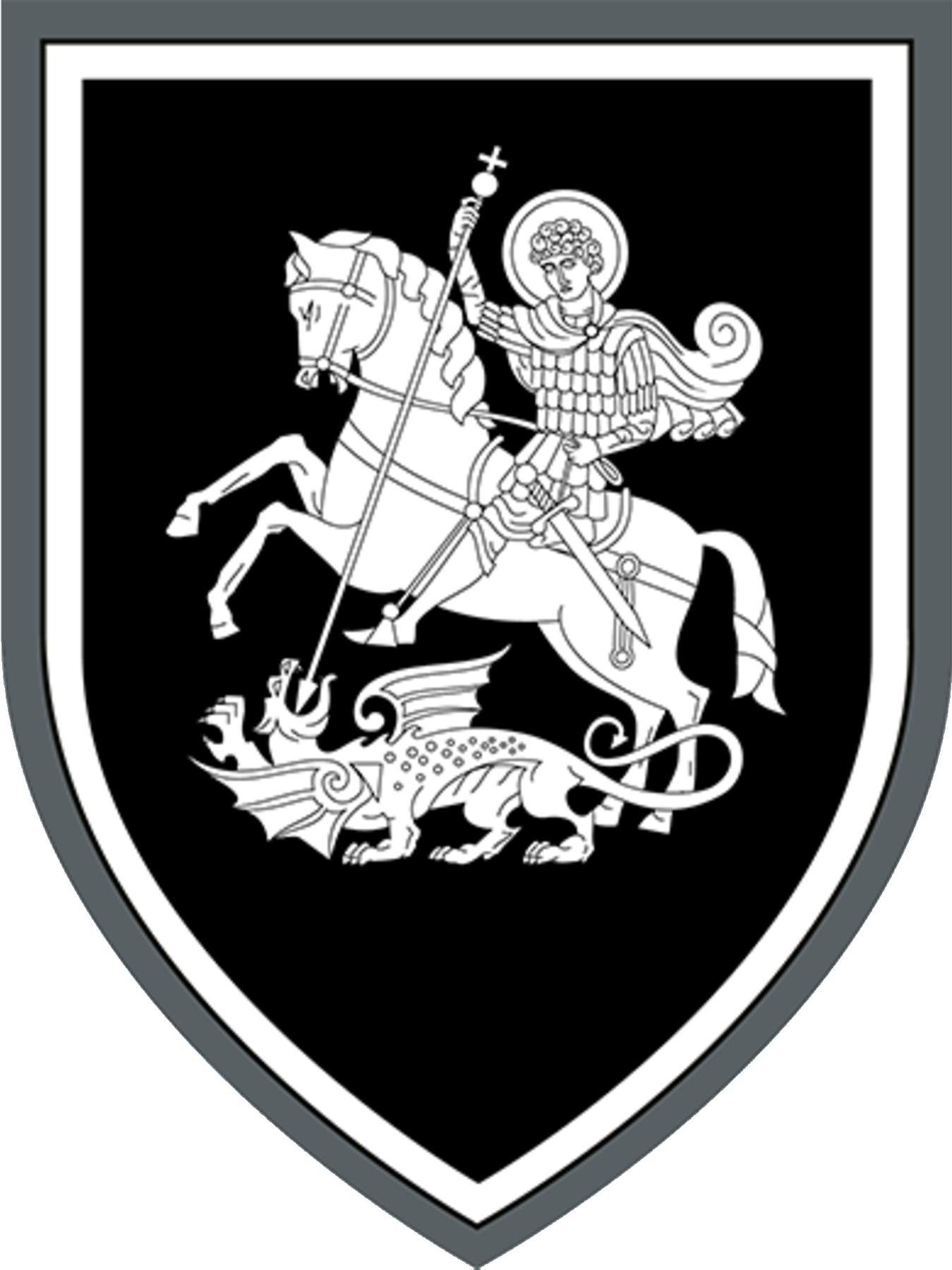
- Coat of arms
- Active: Operational
- Country: Netherlands; Germany
- Branch: Royal Netherlands Army; German Army
- Type: Tank
- Size: around 400
- Garrison/HQ: Bergen-Lohheide

Insignia
NATO Map Symbol
414
43

414 Tank Battalion (German: Panzerbataillon 414; Dutch: 414 Tankbataljon) is a mixed German and Dutch tank battalion, consisting of around 100 Dutch and 300 German soldiers.

== History ==
The battalion was founded in 2016, and became fully operational in 2019.

Previously the German battalion, part of the 41st Panzergrenadier Brigade was active from 1991 to 2006 at Spechtberg. It was established on the basis of the 22nd and 23rd Panzer Regiments, 9th Panzer Division, of the Land Forces of the National People's Army, the former East German Army.

On 17 March 2016, the battalion was attached to the Dutch 43rd Mechanized Brigade which is in turn a part of the German 1st Panzer Division.

The barracks of 414 Panzerbattalion are in Bergen-Lohheide, Lower Saxony.

It has been described as a step towards a "European army".

== Structure ==
414 Tank Battalion consists of the following elements:

- Staff (German, few Dutch)
- 1st staff company (staff and supply, mostly German, few Dutch)
- 2nd tank company (German)
- 3rd tank company (German)
- 4th tank company (Dutch - from Regiment Huzaren Prinses Catharina-Amalia)
- 5th tank company (German and Dutch, reserve)

Out of the 100 Dutch soldiers, 72 are tank crew. The other 28 are staff members, maintenance and support crew.

Commander since 2022 is Luitenant-kolonel (Oberstleutnant) Sebastiaan Schillemans (NL)

== Equipment ==
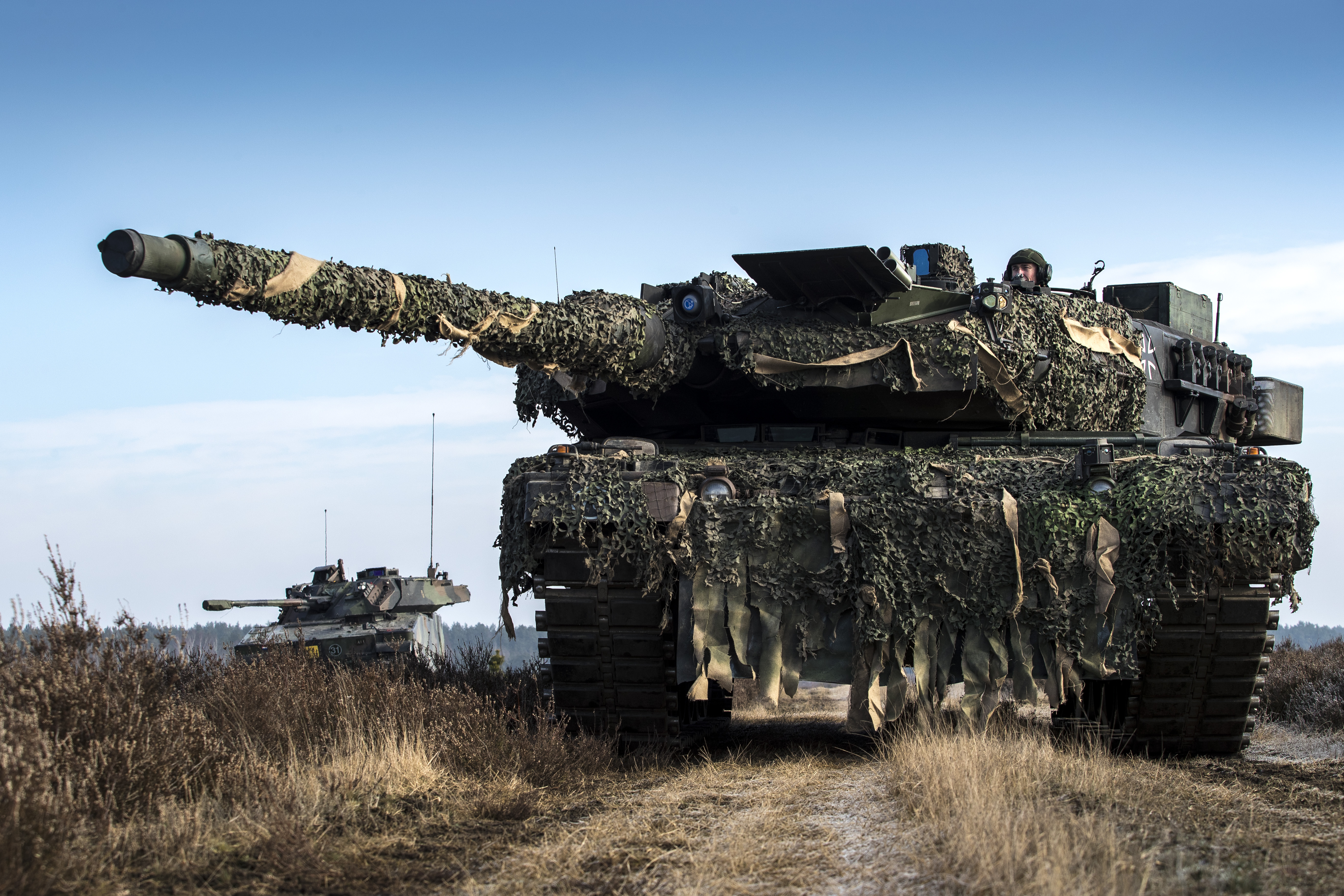
Klietz, Germany, exercise Peacock Supremacy, February 15, 2018. A German Leopard 2 tank and a Dutch CV9035NL from the Dutch 43rd Mechanized Brigade.

The battalion's main armament is the Leopard 2 A6MA2 main battle tank. The unit has 49 or 50 tanks of these upgraded MBTs. The tank is modified with the Dutch battlefield management system ELIAS (Essential Land-based Information Application & Services). This was done anticipating the fact that 414 Tank Battalion would join the Very High Readiness Joint Task Force (VJTF) of the NATO Response Force in 2019. Additionally the German C3I Führungs und Informationssystem des Heeres and the SEM 80/90 VHF radio system can be installed.

The Leopard 2A6MA2s, 50 in total, were upgraded to 2A6MA3 to match the 2A7V standard starting sometime in March-April 2019.

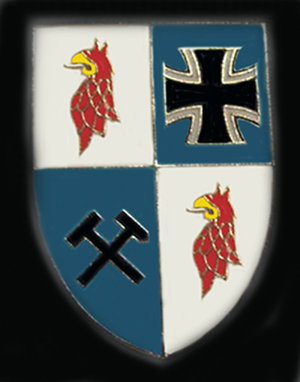
Insignia of previous Panzerbataillon 414
