= Lightweight (disambiguation) =

Lightweight is a weight class in combat sports and rowing.

Lightweight may also refer to:

- Light in weight
- Lightweight (company), a Japanese video game developer
- Lightweight (film), a 2004 French film
- Lightweight (MMA), a mixed martial arts division
- "Lightweight", a song by Demi Lovato from Unbroken
- Land Rover 1/2 ton Lightweight, a British military vehicle
- An adjective used to describe someone with a low alcohol tolerance.

== Computing ==
- Light-weight process
- Light Weight Kernel Threads
- Lightweight software
- Lightweight markup language

== See also ==
- Lightweighting, a concept in the auto industry
- Heavyweight (disambiguation)
