= WHWC =

WHWC may refer to:

- WHWC (FM), a radio station (88.3 FM) licensed to serve Menomonie, Wisconsin, United States
- WHWC-TV, a television station (channel 27, virtual 28) licensed to serve Menomonie, Wisconsin
- World Heavyweight Championship
