= WHC =

WHC may refer to:

== International convention ==
- World Heritage Convention, 1972 treaty
- UNESCO World Heritage Committee
- World Humanist Congress
- World Hindi Conference

== Sports ==
- World Heavyweight Championship
- World Hockey Championship
- Woking Hockey Club
- Women's Hospital Corps

== Transportation ==
- Walthamstow Central station, London, by National Rail station code
- Western Harbour Crossing, a transport tunnel in Hong Kong

== Other uses ==
- United States Army Western Hemisphere Command
