= I Corps (Netherlands) =

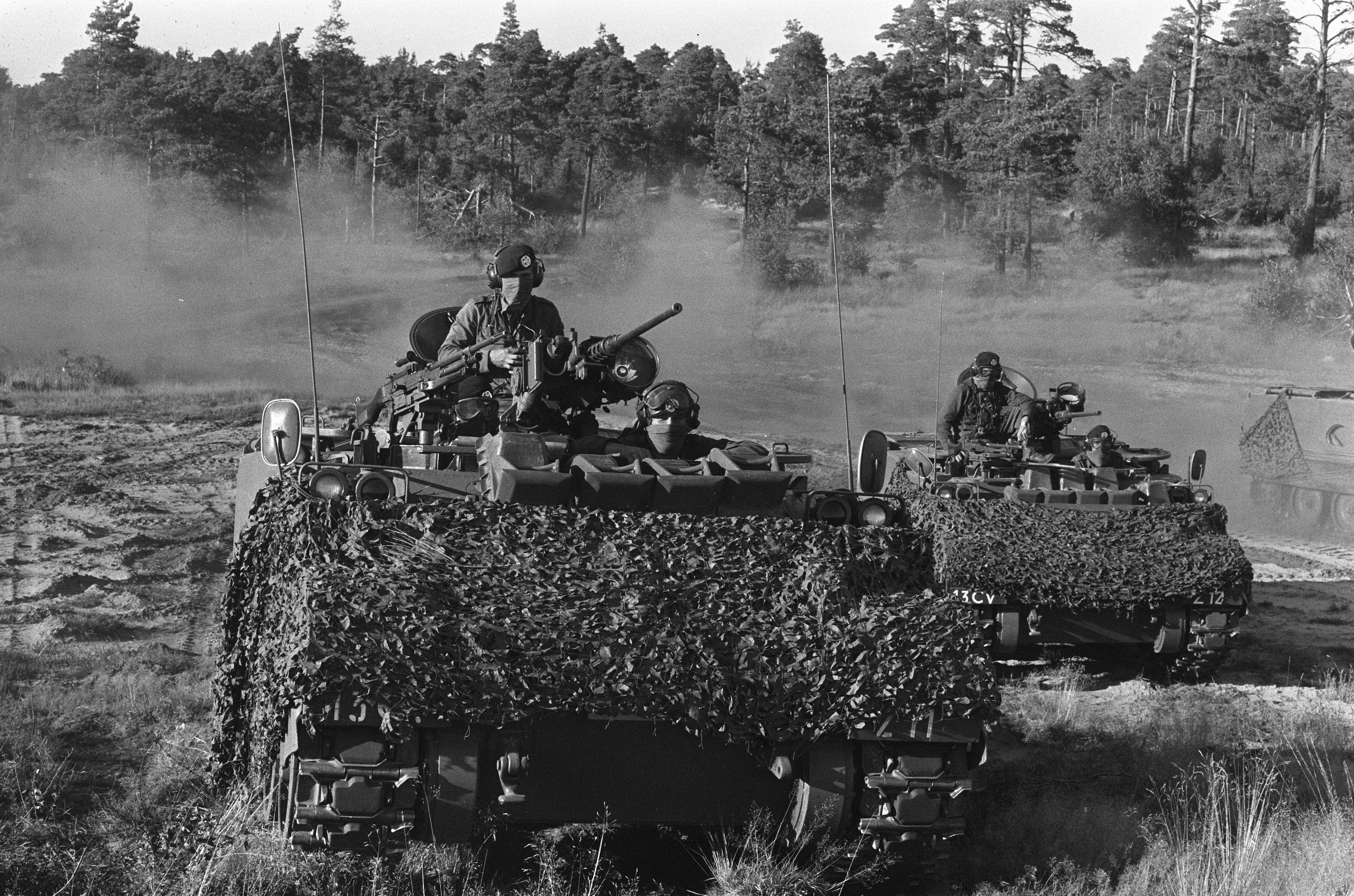
Dutch M113 armored personnel carriers in action during Exercise Big Ferro in West Germany in 1973

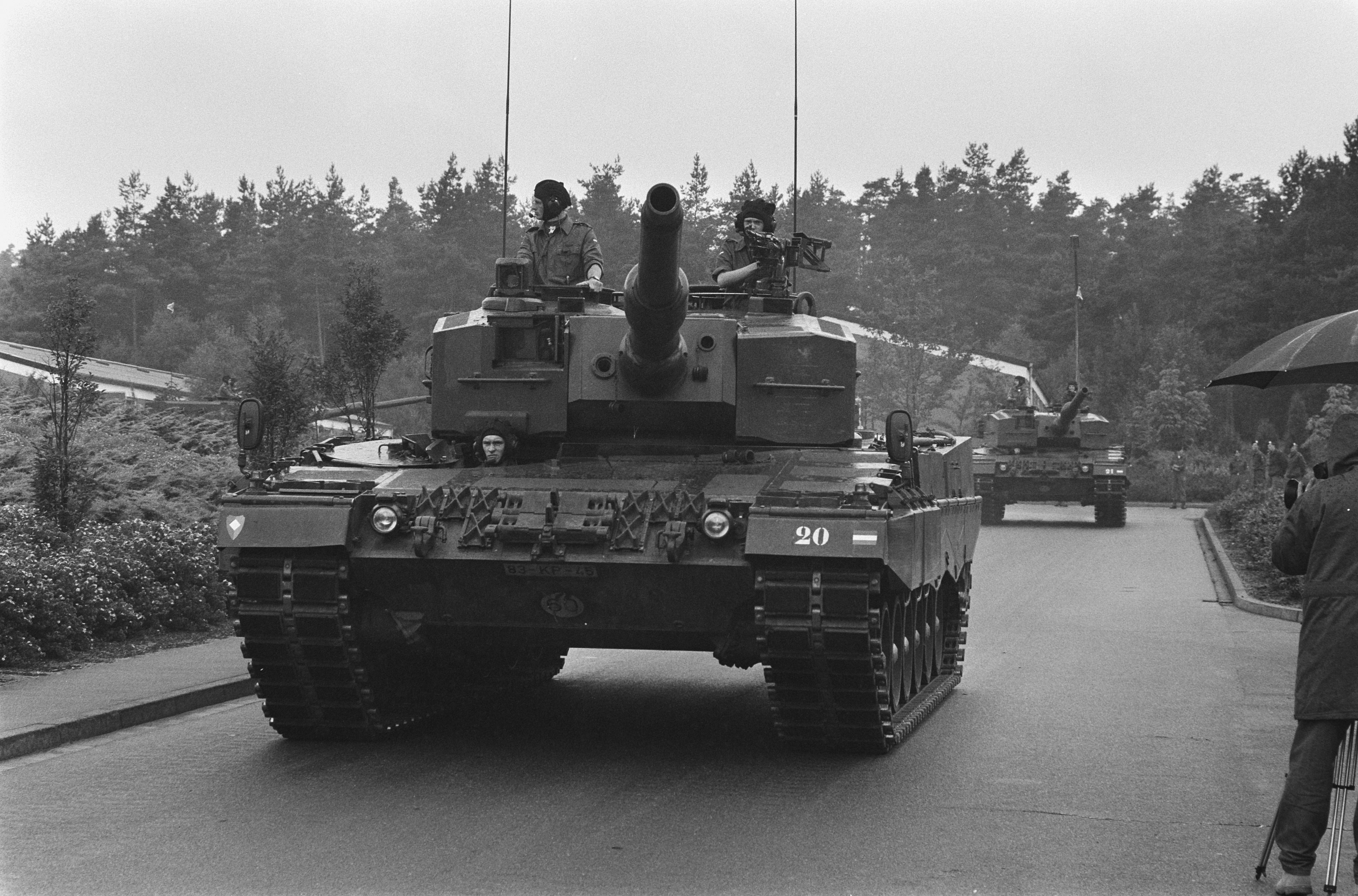
MBT Leopard 2, Seedorf, Lower Saxony, in 1986.

The I Netherlands Corps was an army corps of the Royal Netherlands Army. It formed after the Second World War and after the fall of the Iron Curtain was disestablished.

In January 1949, the government agreed to the establishment of an army corps. In the same year, the North Atlantic Treaty Organization was established. In 1955, after joining West Germany to NATO, the 1st Army Corps was made responsible for the defense of a part of the North German Plain. The army corps was part of the Northern Army Group of NATO. From 1963 onwards, part of the army corps was actually stationed in Germany, namely in Seedorf.

The corps's war assignment, as formulated by Commander, Northern Army Group (COMNORTHAG), would be to:

- Assume responsibility for its corps sector and relieve 1st German Corps forces as soon as possible.
- Fight the covering force battle in accordance with COMNORTHAG's concept of operations.
- In the main defensive battle: (1) hold and destroy the forces of the enemy's leading armies conventionally as far east as possible, maintaining cohesion with 1 (GE) Corps; (2) in the event of a major penetration affecting 1 (NL) Corps sector, be prepared to hold the area between the roads A7 and B3 and to conduct a counterattack according to COMNORTHAG's concept of operations.
- Maintain cohesion with LANDJUT and secure NORTHAG's left flank in the Forward Combat Zone.

== Structure ==
I NL Corps and its assigned German units and Dutch units based or earmarked for rapid deployment to Germany in 1989

After the Second World War until July 18, 1995 the Royal Netherlands Army had one army corps (1st Army Corps) of three divisions (1st Division "7 December", 4th, and 5th) and army corps troops.

First Division "7 December" was withdrawn from the East Indies in 1949–1950 and spent the remainder of the Cold War as part of NATO Northern Army Group's I (Netherlands) Corps as a deterrent against a Soviet attack on West Germany. In 1985, it had its headquarters at Schaarsbergen, and divisional troops included the 102nd Reconnaissance Battalion (maintained through the Dutch mobilisation system RIM) at Hoogland.

== See also ==
- NORTHAG wartime structure in 1989
- Belgian Forces in Germany
