= Heavyweight (disambiguation) =

Heavyweight is a weight class in combat sports. It may also refer to:

- Heavyweight (MMA), mixed martial arts weight class
- Heavyweights, 1995 comedy film
- "Heavyweight", a 2007 song by Infected Mushroom
- "Heavyweight", a 2023 song by Yeat from Afterlyfe
- "Heavyweight" (song), a 2011 song by Our Lady Peace
- Heavyweight, some types of early 20th century North American railway passenger cars, generally having six axles instead of the standard four
- Heavyweight (podcast), a podcast produced by Pushkin Industries

== See also ==
- Weight class, in various sports
- World heavyweight championship (disambiguation)
