= First Division "7 December" =

- Eerste Divisie "7 December"
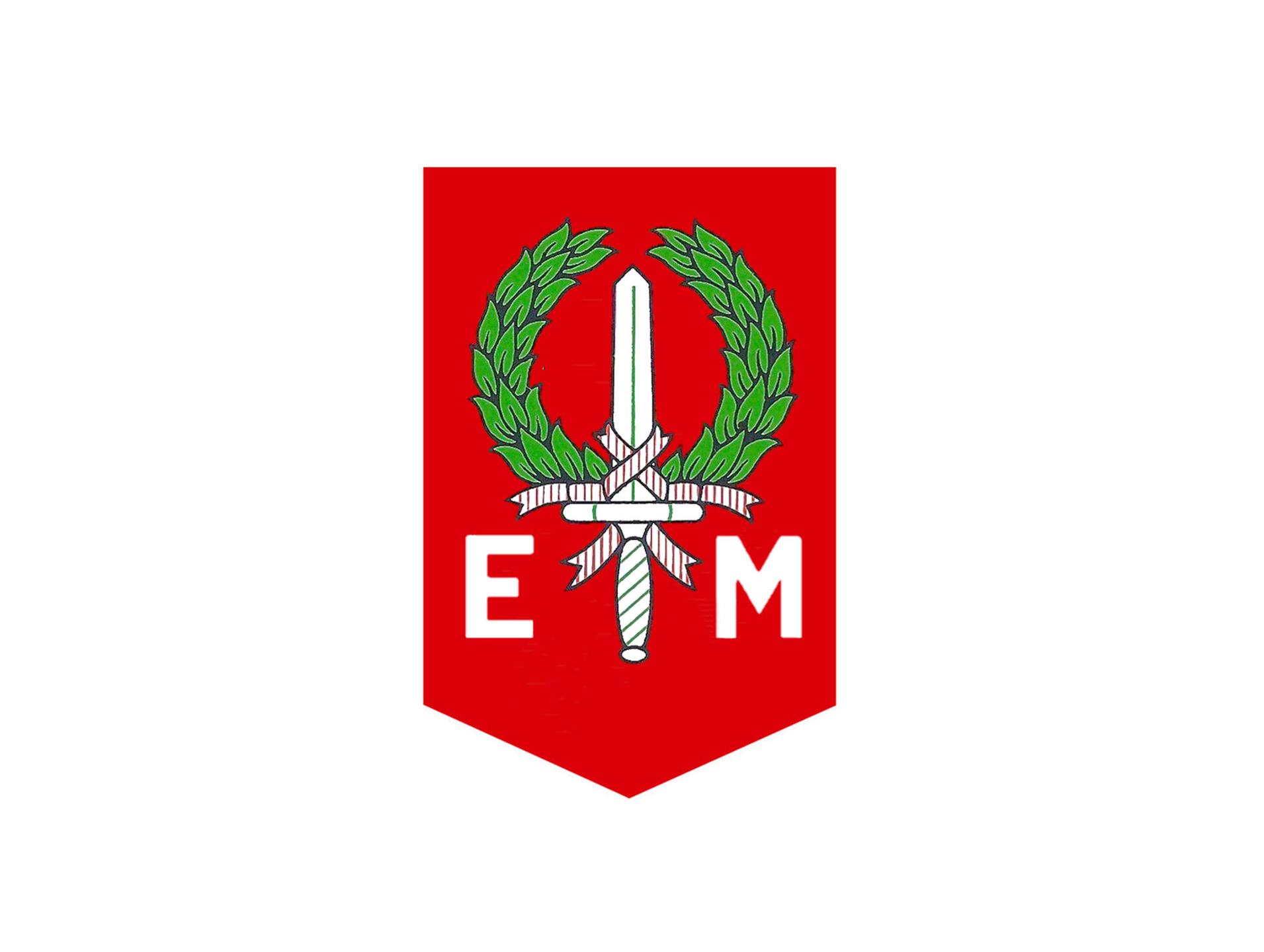
- Emblem of the Eerste Divisie "7 December"
- Active: 1946–2004
- Country: Netherlands
- Branch: Army
- Part of: I (Netherlands) Corps
- Garrison/HQ: Schaarsbergen

The First Division "7 December" (Dutch: Eerste Divisie "7 December") was a division of the Royal Netherlands Army, active from at least 1946 to 2004. It was sent to Indonesia in 1946 to restore "peace, order and security" after the proclamation of Indonesian Independence in 1945.

== History ==
The division was named after the speech of Queen Wilhelmina of the Netherlands in London on 7 December 1942:

"I imagine, without prejudice to the government conference's advice, that they will focus on a National Association, which the Netherlands, Indonesia, Suriname and Curaçao will have participated together, while each in itself, its own autonomy in internal affairs and drawing on their own, but together with the will to assist, will represent. It will be difference of treatment based on race or national character have no place, but will only have the personal ability of citizens and the needs of different populations for the decisive policy of the Government."

The division was withdrawn from the East Indies in 1949–1950 and spent the remainder of the Cold War as part of NATO Northern Army Group's I (Netherlands) Corps as a deterrent against a Soviet attack on West Germany. In 1985, it had its headquarters at Schaarsbergen, and divisional troops included the 102nd Reconnaissance Battalion (maintained through the Dutch mobilisation system RIM) at Hoogland. The 11th Mechanised Brigade included the 12th and 48th Mechanised Battalions, the 101st Tank Battalion, and the 11th Field Artillery Battalion. The 12th Mechanised Brigade was headquartered at Nunspeet and the 13th Armoured Brigade was at Oirschot.

After the end of the Cold War, it became part of the I. German/Dutch Corps for a period. The division was disbanded on 1 January 2004 and the title of '7 December' was transferred to the 11 Luchtmobiele Brigade (11th Airmobile Brigade).

== Divisional Organization 1989 ==
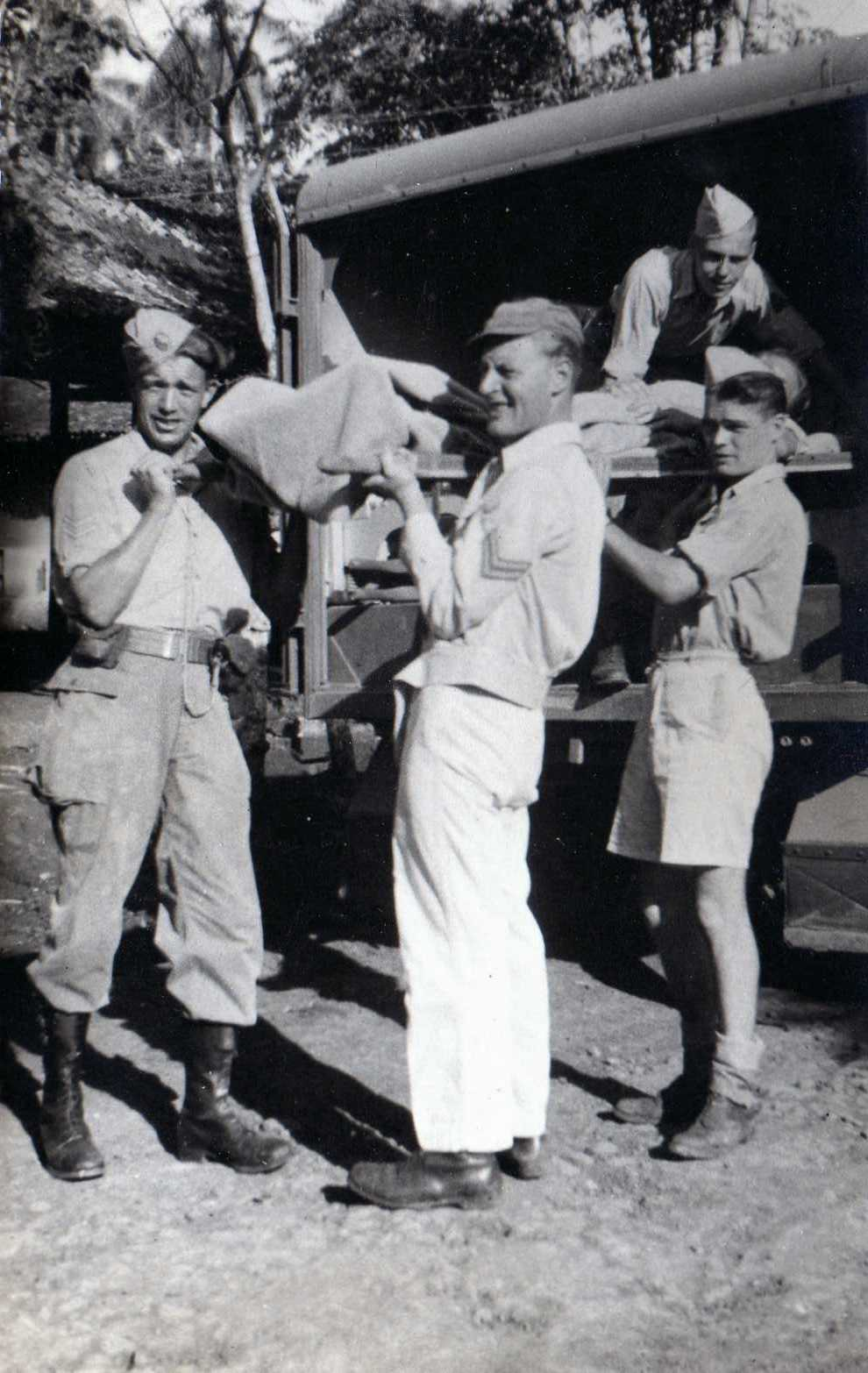
Soldiers of the 7 December Division carry a wounded soldier out of an ambulance in the Dutch East Indies

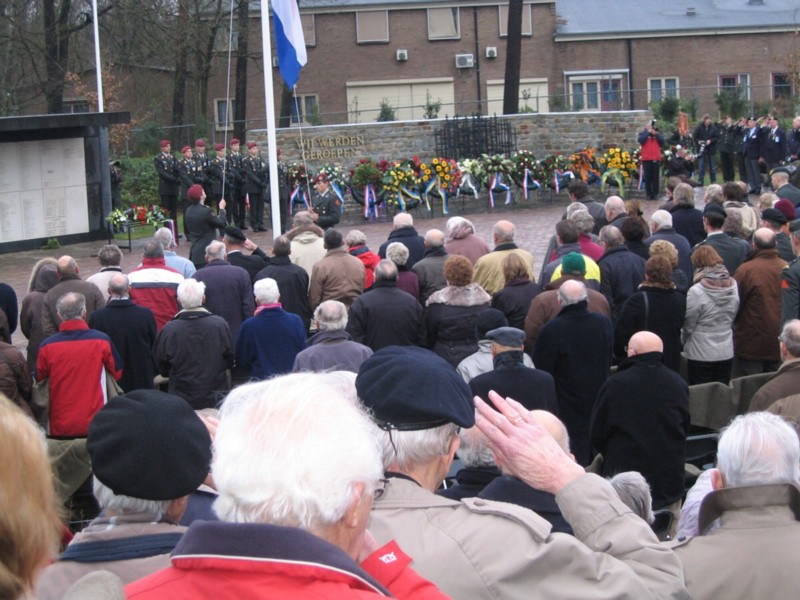
Memorial reunion of the 7 December Division at the Oranjekazerne in Schaarsbergen on Friday 5 December 2008

- 1e Divisie "7 December" (Mechanized), Arnhem, NL
  - Staff and Staff Company, Arnhem
  - 102nd Reconnaissance Battalion "Huzaren van Boreel", Amersfoort (18 x Leopard 1V, 48 x M113-Command & Reconnaissance)
  - 11e Pantserinfanteriebrigade, Arnhem, NL
    - Staff and Staff Company, Arnhem
    - 101st Pantser Battalion "Regiment Huzaren Prins Alexander", Soesterberg (61 x Leopard 1V, 12 x YPR-765)
    - 12th Pantserinfanterie Battalion "Garde Regiment Jagers", Arnhem (70 x YPR-765, 16 x YPR-765 PRAT)
    - 48th Pantserinfanterie Battalion "Regiment van Heutsz", 's-Hertogenbosch (70 x YPR-765, 16 x YPR-765 PRAT)
    - 11th Horse Artillery Battalion "Gele Rijders", Arnhem (20 x M109A3)
    - 11th Armored Anti-Tank Company, Ermelo (YPR-765 PRAT)
    - 11th Armored Engineer Company, Ermelo
    - 11th Brigade Supply Company, Stroe
    - 11th Brigade Maintenance Company, Arnhem
    - 11th Brigade Medical Company, Stroe
  - 12e Pantserinfanteriebrigade, Vierhouten, NL
    - Staff and Staff Company, Vierhouten
    - 59th Pantser Battalion "Regiment Huzaren Prins Oranje", 't Harde (61 x Leopard 1V, 12 x YPR-765)
    - 11th Pantserinfanterie Battalion "Garde Regiment Grenadiers", Arnhem (70 x YPR-765, 16 x YPR-765 PRAT)
    - 13th Pantserinfanterie Battalion "Garde Fusiliers Princess Irene", Schalkhaar (70 x YPR-765, 16 x YPR-765 PRAT)
    - 14th Field Artillery Battalion (Reserve), Vierhouten (20 x M109A3)
    - 12th Armored Anti-Tank Company, Vierhouten (YPR-765 PRAT)
    - 12th Armored Engineer Company, Vierhouten
    - 13th Brigade Supply Company, Vierhouten
    - 12th Brigade Maintenance Company, Uddel
    - 12th Brigade Medical Company, Vierhouten
  - 13e Pantserbrigade, Oirschot, NL
    - Staff and Staff Company, Oirschot
    - 11th Pantser Battalion "Huzaren van Sytzama", Oirschot (52 x Leopard 1V, 12 YPR-765)
    - 49th Pantser Battalion (Reserve) "Huzaren van Sytzama", Oirschot (52 x Leopard 1V, 12 x YPR-765)
    - 17th Pantserinfanterie Battalion "Regiment Infanterie Chasse", Oirschot (70 x YPR-765, 16 x YPR-765 PRAT)
    - 12th Field Artillery Battalion, Oirschot (20 x M109A3)
    - 13th Armored Engineer Company, Oirschot
    - 12th Brigade Supply Company, Oirschot
    - 13th Brigade Maintenance Company, Oirschot
    - 13th Brigade Medical Company, Oirschot

== Sources ==
- Alfred van Sprang Wij werden geroepen : de geschiedenis van de 7 December Divisie, met zweten en zwoegen geschreven door twintigduizend Nederlandse mannen (1949)
- Herinneringsalbum 1e infanterie brigadegroep C Divisie "7 December" 1e deel 1 September 1946 - 1 mrt. 1947, 2e deel mrt. 1947 - sept 1947, 3e deel sept. 1947 - mrt. 1948 en 4e deel 1 mrt. 1948 – Demobilisatie. Uitgegeven door A. W. Sijthoff's uitgeversmij N.V. te Leiden
- Arthur ten Cate De laatste divisie : de geschiedenis van 1 Divisie '7 December' na de val van de Muur 1989-2004 (2004) ISBN 90-12-10669-9
