= 11th Airmobile Brigade =

Dutch military unit

- 11 Luchtmobiele Brigade '7 december'
- Founded: 1992–present
- Country: Netherlands
- Branch: Royal Netherlands Army
- Type: Rapid deployment force
- Role: Airmobile operations Special operations support Reconnaissance; Non-combatant evacuation operation Direct Action
- Size: 2,100 troops
- Part of: Rapid Forces Division
- Garrison/HQ: Schaarsbergen; Assen; Willemstad
- Motto: Nec temere, nec timide
- Mascot: Falcon
- Engagements: Bosnian War; Iraq War; War in Afghanistan; Mali War

Commanders
- Current commander: Brigadier General Frank Grandia EMSD

The 11th Airmobile Brigade (Dutch: 11 Luchtmobiele Brigade) is the rapid light infantry brigade of the Royal Netherlands Army, focused on conducting air assault operations. Troops of the brigade are qualified to wear the maroon beret upon completion of the demanding training course, those qualified as military parachutists wear the appropriate parachutist wings. The brigade received the name "7 December" when the First Division "7 December" was disbanded in 2004.

Since 2014, the brigade has been integrated into the Rapid Forces Division (German: Division Schnelle Kräfte) of the German Army. When the 11th Airmobile Brigade operates integrally with the Defence Helicopter Command (Dutch: Defensie Helikopter Commando) of the Royal Netherlands Air Force they form the 11th Air Manoeuvre Brigade (11 AMB). In 2003 in Poland (exercise Gainful Sword), 2012 in the Netherlands (exercise Peregrine Sword) and 2014 in Hungary the brigade completed its operational readiness tests to (re)apply for the "Air Assault" status. The successful qualifications demonstrated the ability to conduct a brigade-sized operation as 11 AMB.

== History ==
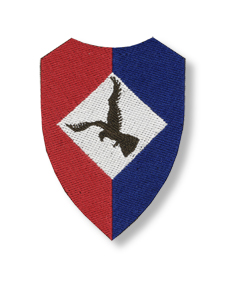
First brigade emblem in 1992

=== Origins ===
The world's security situation changed drastically after the Fall of the Berlin Wall in 1989. In the Netherlands, the need arose for a rapid reaction force for expeditionary operations. Consequently, the 11th Airmobile Brigade was formed in 1992. Due to the highly specialised nature of the brigade the army decided that the brigade would not rely on conscripts, but instead recruit professional soldiers from other units. After ten years of pioneering, the brigade acquired its operational readiness status in October 2003.

The emblem of 11th Airmobile Brigade is made up of a diving falcon on a maroon shield with two crossed swords underneath. The background color is related to the maroon berets worn by troops of the brigade. The maroon beret is the international standard for air landing troops. The EM stands for Expeditionaire Macht, Expeditionary Force, which is a tradition derived from the emblem of the First Division "7 December".

=== Bosnia ===
During the early formation days of the brigade, the brigade provided troops for the United Nations peacekeeping mission United Nations Protection Force (UNPROFOR), in the former Yugoslavia. These battalions, knowns as Dutchbats, were deployed between February 1994 and November 1995 and tasked to execute United Nations Security Council Resolution 819 in the Bosniak Muslim enclaves and the UN-designated "safe zone" of Srebrenica during the Bosnian War. In July 1995 as the Bosnian Serb forces, under Colonel General Ratko Mladić, came to take over the enclave, Dutchbat was vastly outnumbered and too lightly equipped to repel the heavily armed Bosnian Serb troops. Moreover, Dutchbat's requests for air support to the UNPROFOR were denied. Subsequently, the Serb forces, under Mladić's command, led Srebrenica's Bosniak male inhabitants into the mountains, where thousands of them were massacred.

=== Iraq ===
After the 2003 invasion of Iraq, the UN mandated the Stabilisation Force Iraq (SFIR) with maintaining public order and contributing to the training of Iraqi security forces. The Netherlands were responsible for the province of Al-Muthanna since July 2003, 11th Airmobile Brigade contributed a company to SFIR-3, and the majority of the SFIR-4 and SFIR-5 rotations between July 2004 and March 2005. Troops of the brigade were regularly confronted with firefights and IED strikes. On 10 May 2004, Sergeant First Class Dave Steensma (12 Infantry Battalion) was killed in action. The Netherlands ended its contribution to SFIR in March 2005.

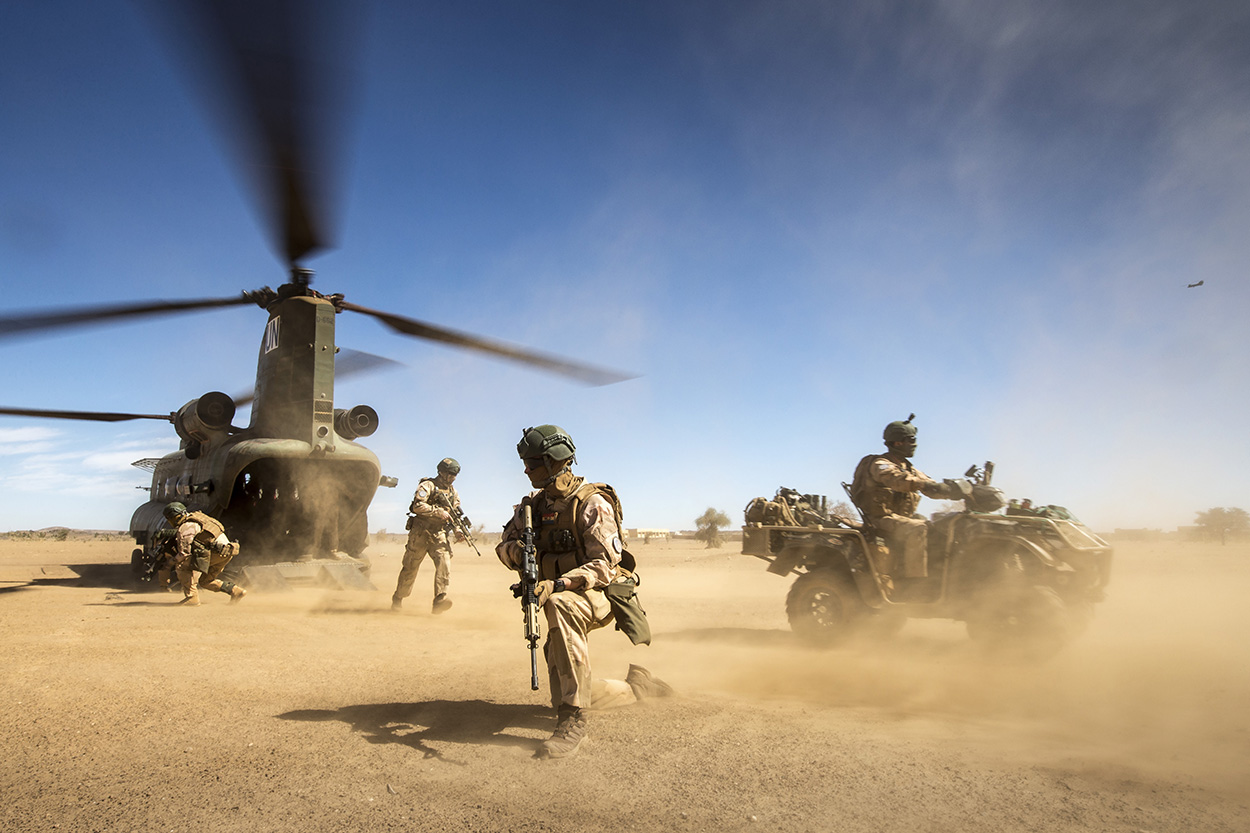
Troops of 11th Airmobile Brigade dismounting a CH-47 Chinook, north of Gao, in 2017

=== Afghanistan ===
The Netherlands Armed Forces have had a military presence in Afghanistan since the early stages of Operation Enduring Freedom in October 2001. In December 2001, the Dutch government decided to deploy a reinforced company of approximately 200 personnel to the International Security Assistance Force (ISAF). For each rotation, one of the three infantry battalions of 11th Airmobile Brigade supplied a company.

From 2006 onwards, the brigade regularly supplied the core fighting elements to the Battlegroups of Task Force Uruzgan, which was a joint task force of Australia and the Netherlands that was responsible for the Afghan province of Uruzgan. TFU was divided between two main locations, Kamp Holland within Multi National Base Tarin Kot in Tarin Kowt, and Camp Hadrian in Deh Rawood. The Dutch contribution to the Battlegroup of TFU always consisted of a company of 13 Infantry Battalion, in addition to other troops of the brigade. Men of the brigade were often engaged in fierce combat, including the Battle of Chora. The Netherlands lost 25 men during TFU, of which four men belonged to 11th Airmobile Brigade: Sergeant major Jos Leunissen, Sergeant Bart van Boxtel, Corporal Cor Strik, Private Tim Hoogland and Sergeant Mark Weijdt. The Netherlands ended its large-scale deployment of troops, which amounted to more than 2000 troops, in August 2010.

=== Mali ===
Since 2014, the Netherlands contributed troops to the UN peacekeeping mission MINUSMA in Mali. The Dutch forces were tasked with conducting reconnaissance and gathering intelligence on the various rebel factions that were active in their sectors. After two years, during which the Korps Commandotroepen (KCT) and Netherlands Maritime Special Operations Forces (NLMARSOF) provided the core fighting element, troops 11th Airmobile Brigade took over these duties in December 2016. These rotations formed the Long-Range Reconnaissance Patrol Task Group Desert Falcon (LRRPTG-DF) and conducted long-range reconnaissances, dismantled hidden weapon caches and arrested combatants who were responsible for IED attacks. On 6 July 2016, two men of the brigade, Sergeant Michel Hoving and Corporal Kevin Roggeveld, were killed during a training accident with a faulty mortar. The Netherlands ended the contribution to MINUSMA in May 2019.

== Tasks ==
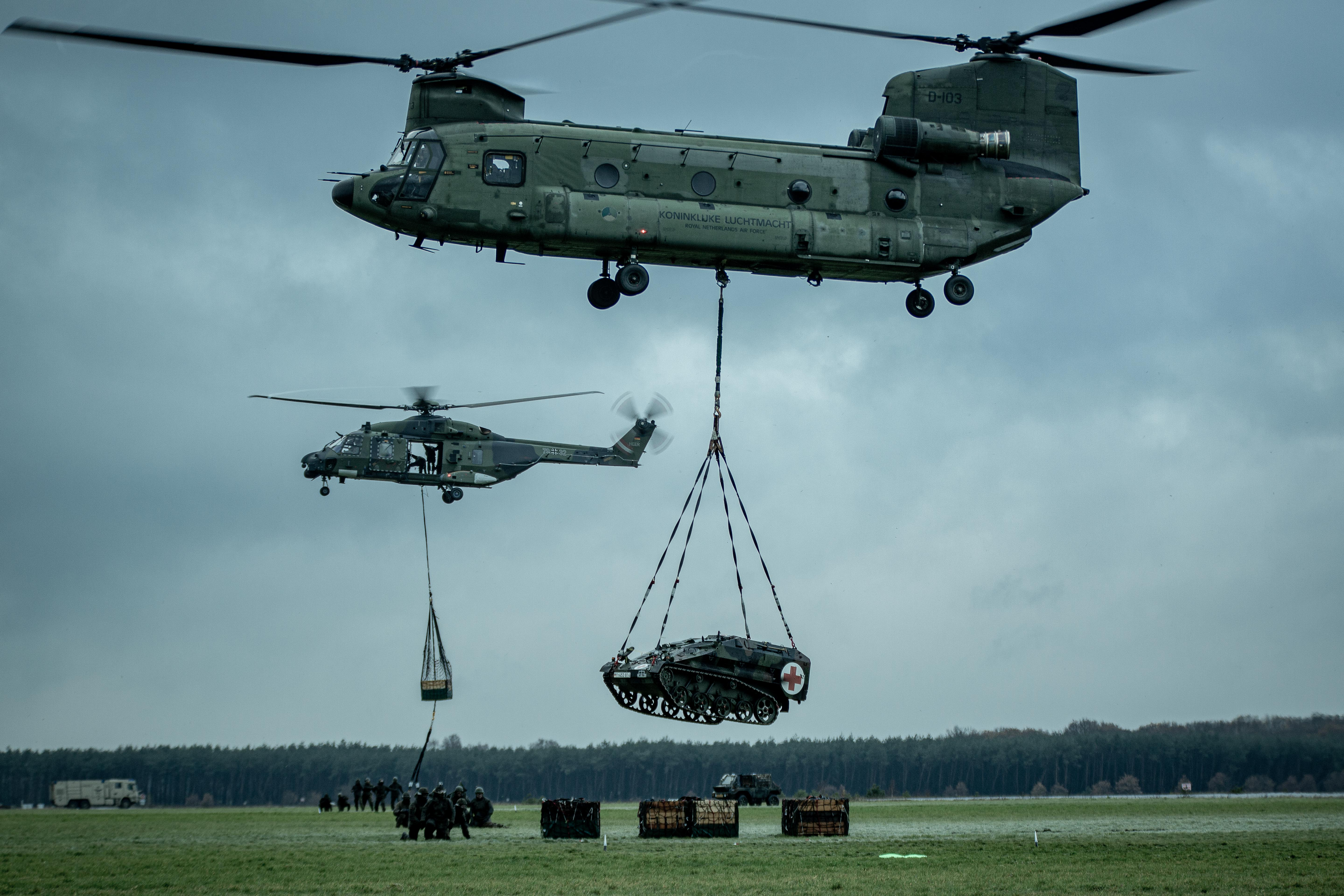
RNLAF CH-47 Chinook lifting a German Wiesel 2 Ambulance at Deelen Air Base

The 11th Airmobile Brigade is a rapidly deployable and highly mobile force. The brigade operates either by foot, using light vehicles or using tactical or strategic airlift capabilities (such as helicopters or airplanes). All the operational units of the brigade are Air Assault (AASLT)-capable. Additionally, a part of the brigade are qualified for airborne operations. This includes the 11th Infantry Battalion, one independent Infantry Company, five Reconnaissance Platoons (including the Pathfinder Platoon) and approximately one third of the combat support and combat service support units. The air manoeuvre warfare conducted by the brigade makes it especially effective for operations behind enemy lines, to swiftly gain hold of strategic locations such as bridges until being relieved by mechanised infantry and cavalry units. Therefore, the maroon berets are specialised in platoon- and company-sized raids.

The brigade distinguishes a number of operational concepts. CH-47 Chinook and AS532 Cougar transport helicopters from the Defence Helicopter Command support the brigade with the transport of troops, weapons and materiel, while AH-64 Apache attack helicopters are used for reconnaissance and air support purposes. When the helicopters are deployed combinedly with infantry during an offensive operation, they qualify as air assault operations. The use of helicopters that is limited to the transport of troops merely qualifies as an airmobile operation, while combined operations with the attack helicopters qualify as air mechanised operations. Lastly, the operational deployment of paratroopers are called airborne operations. Moreover, the brigade is capable of operating in a motorised capacity using heavily armed, light-armoured vehicles. Troops that have undergone specialised training are qualified to assist the army's Special Operations Forces (SOF), the Korps Commandotroepen, as a designated support element. The SOF support functions as an integral part of a Special Operations Task Group (SOTG).

== Organisation ==
=== Locations ===
- Deelen Air Base, in Schaarsbergen: 52°03′20″N 5°52′53″E
- Oranje Barracks, in Schaarsbergen: 52°01′53″N 5°53′41″E
- Johan Willem Friso Barracks, in Assen: 52°59′30″N 6°32′13″E
- Naval Base Parera, on Curaçao: 12°06′47″N 68°55′14″W

=== Units ===
As of March 2025 the 11th Airmobile Brigade consists the following units:

- 11th Airmobile Brigade (11 Luchtmobiele Brigade), in Schaarsbergen
  - 11 Staff Company (11 Stafcompagnie), in Schaarsbergen
  - 11 Infantry Battalion (Air Assault) "Garderegiment Grenadiers en Jagers" (11 Infanteriebataljon (Air Assault) "Garderegiment Grenadiers en Jagers"), in Schaarsbergen (Airborne operations)
    - A, B, C and D Company
  - 12 Infantry Battalion (Air Assault) "Regiment van Heutsz" (12 Infanteriebataljon (Air Assault) "Regiment van Heutsz"), in Schaarsbergen (SOF Support)
    - A, B, C and D Company
  - 13 Infantry Battalion (Air Assault) "Regiment Stoottroepen Prins Bernhard" (13 Infanteriebataljon (Air Assault) "Regiment Stoottroepen Prins Bernhard"), in Assen
    - A, B, C and D Company
  - 20 Infantry Battalion (20 Infanteriebataljon) National Reserve Corps, in The Hague
    - Alpha Company (Alfa-compagnie), in The Hague
    - Bravo Company (Bravo-compagnie), in Bergen
    - Charlie Company (Charlie-compagnie), in Badhoevedorp
    - Delta Company (Delta-compagnie), in The Hague
    - Echo Company (Echo-compagnie), in Stroe
    - Foxtrot Company (Foxtrot-compagnie), in Schaarsbergen
  - 11 Brigade Reconnaissance Squadron "Regiment Huzaren van Boreel" (11 Brigade Verkenningseskadron "Regiment Huzaren van Boreel"), in Schaarsbergen
    - Pathfinder Platoon (Pathfinderpeloton), in Schaarsbergen
  - 11 Engineer Company (11 Geniecompagnie), in Schaarsbergen
  - 11 Medical Company (11 Geneeskundige compagnie), in Assen
  - 11 Supply Company (11 Bevoorradingscompagnie), in Schaarsbergen
  - 11 Maintenance Company (11 Herstelcompagnie), in Schaarsbergen and Assen
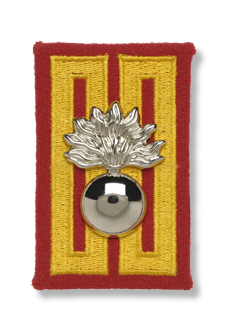
Insignia of the Grenadiers' regiment

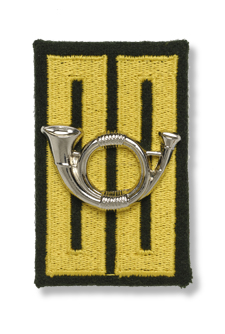
Insignia of the Rifle Guard regiment

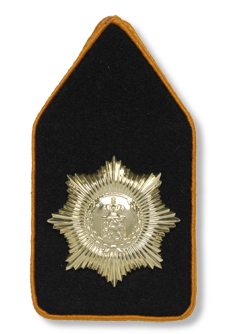
Insignia of the 'van Heutsz' regiment

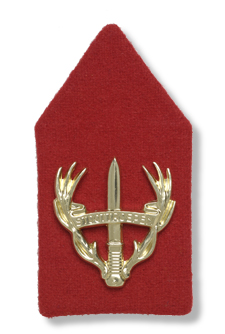
Insignia of the 'Stoottroepen Prins Bernhard' regiment

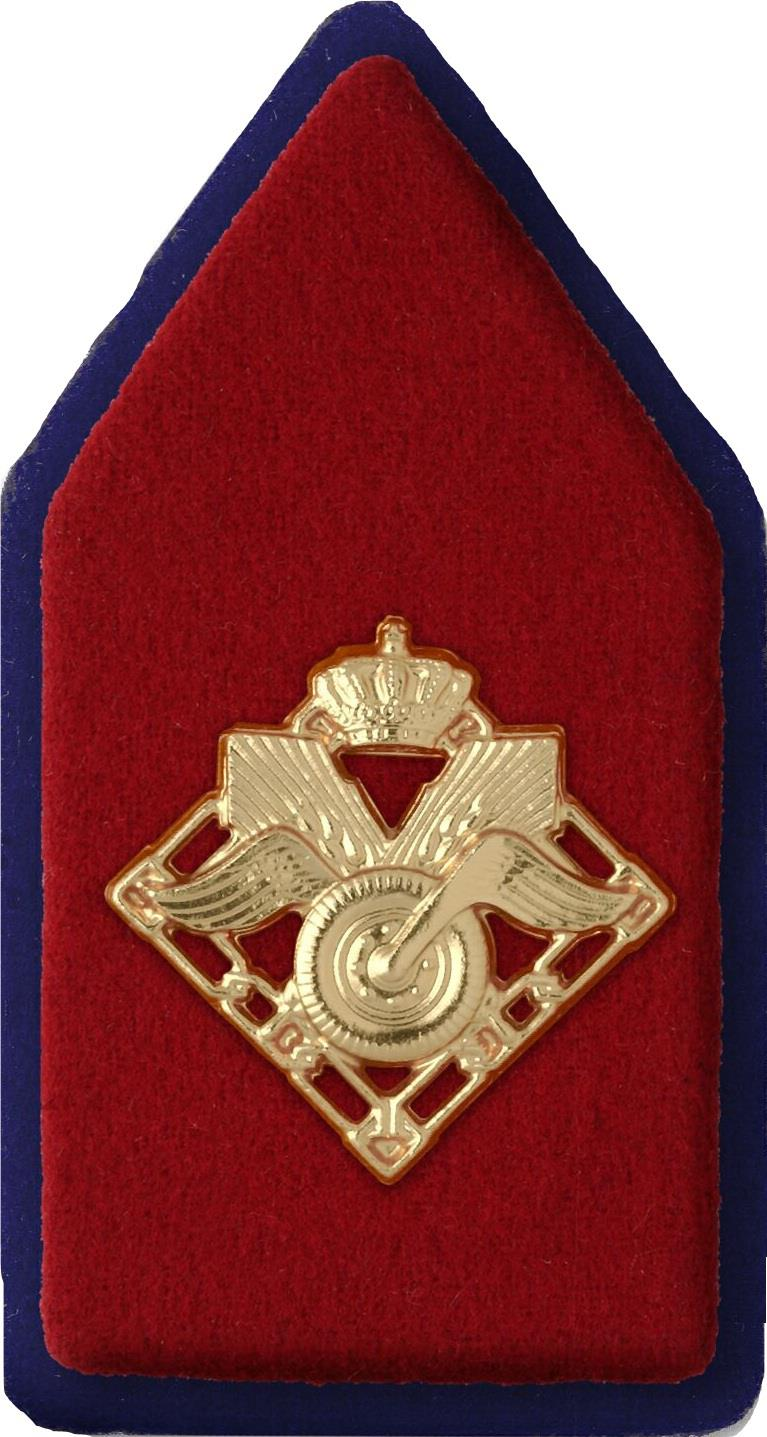
Insignia of the Supply and Transport regiment

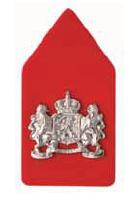
Insignia of the National Reserves

=== Structure ===
==== Organisation of a battalion ====
Dutch Para Wing A

An infantry battalion consists of a headquarters, three line companies and a patrol company. The infantry has a wide variety of means to performs its tasks and carries enough equipment in its backpacks to fight in the field for 72 hours. Since 2019, the 11th Infantry Battalion is airborne designated and all companies are airborne qualified. Moreover, the 12th Infantry Battalion has restructured the C and D Companies into designated SOF Support Companies. All infantry battalions are still required to perform air assault tasks on battalion and brigade level.

==== Organisation of an infantry company ====
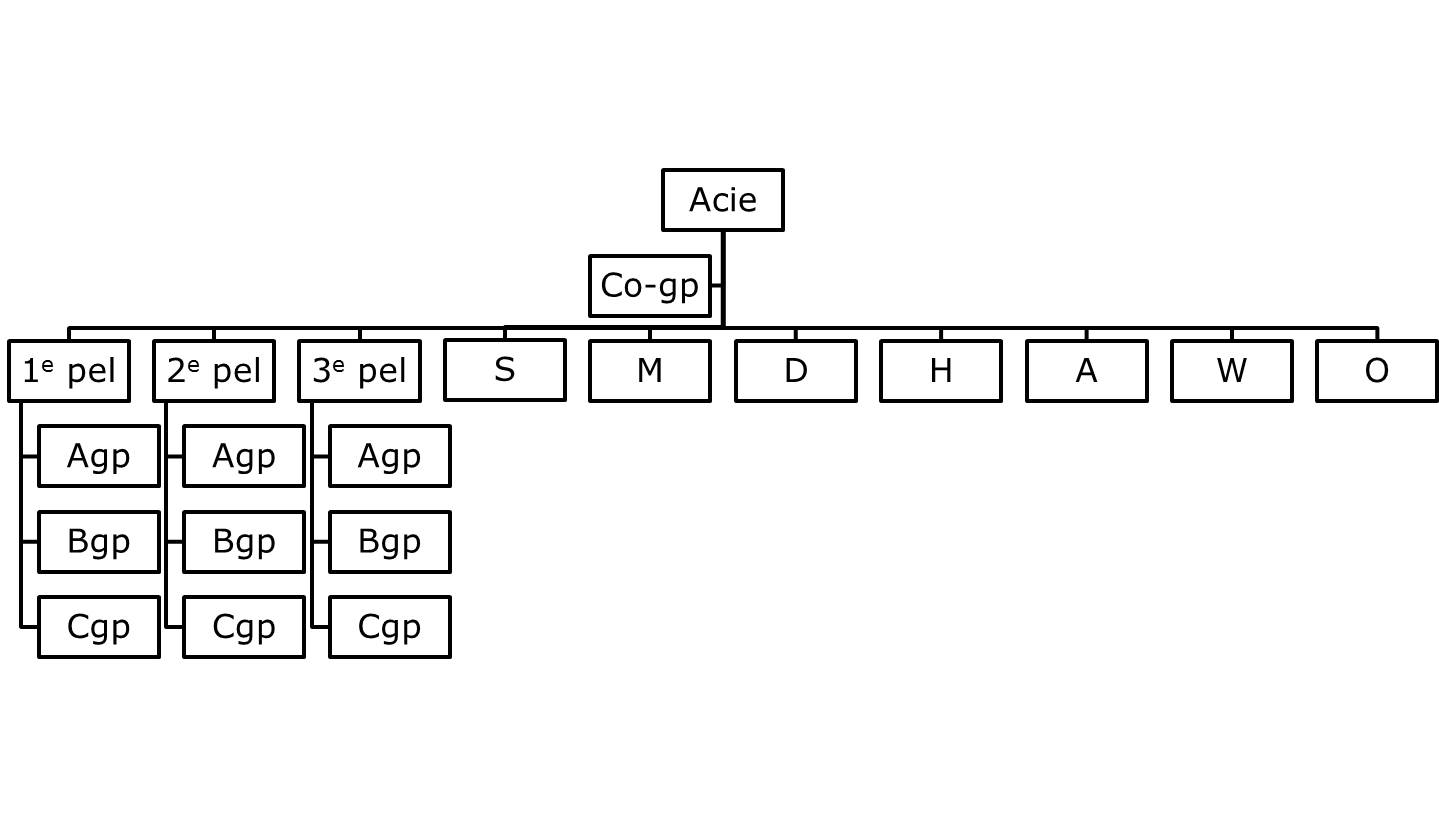
Organogram infantry company

An infantry company consist of a headquarters platoon, three line platoons, a mortars squad, sniper squad and fire support squad. The fire support squads consist of a JTAC team and FO team. The company's size averages 130 personnel, led by a captain who is assisted by his 2IC (an experienced lieutenant), a company first sergeant and operations & training sergeant (rank of master sergeant).

The line platoons are composed of three squads and a platoon headquarters. The three identical squads are commanded by a sergeant with a corporal as his second in command. The squad consists of eight men; two infantry sappers, two machine gunners who operate the FN Minimi light machine gun and two anti-armour gunners who operate the Panzerfaust 3 (very short-range anti-tank) and Panzerfaust 3 Dynarange (short-range anti-tank) anti-tank weapons. The platoon headquarters consist of the platoon commander (a 1st or 2nd lieutenant), the platoon sergeant (a first sergeant) and the platoon medic (a corporal).

==== Organisation of a patrol company ====
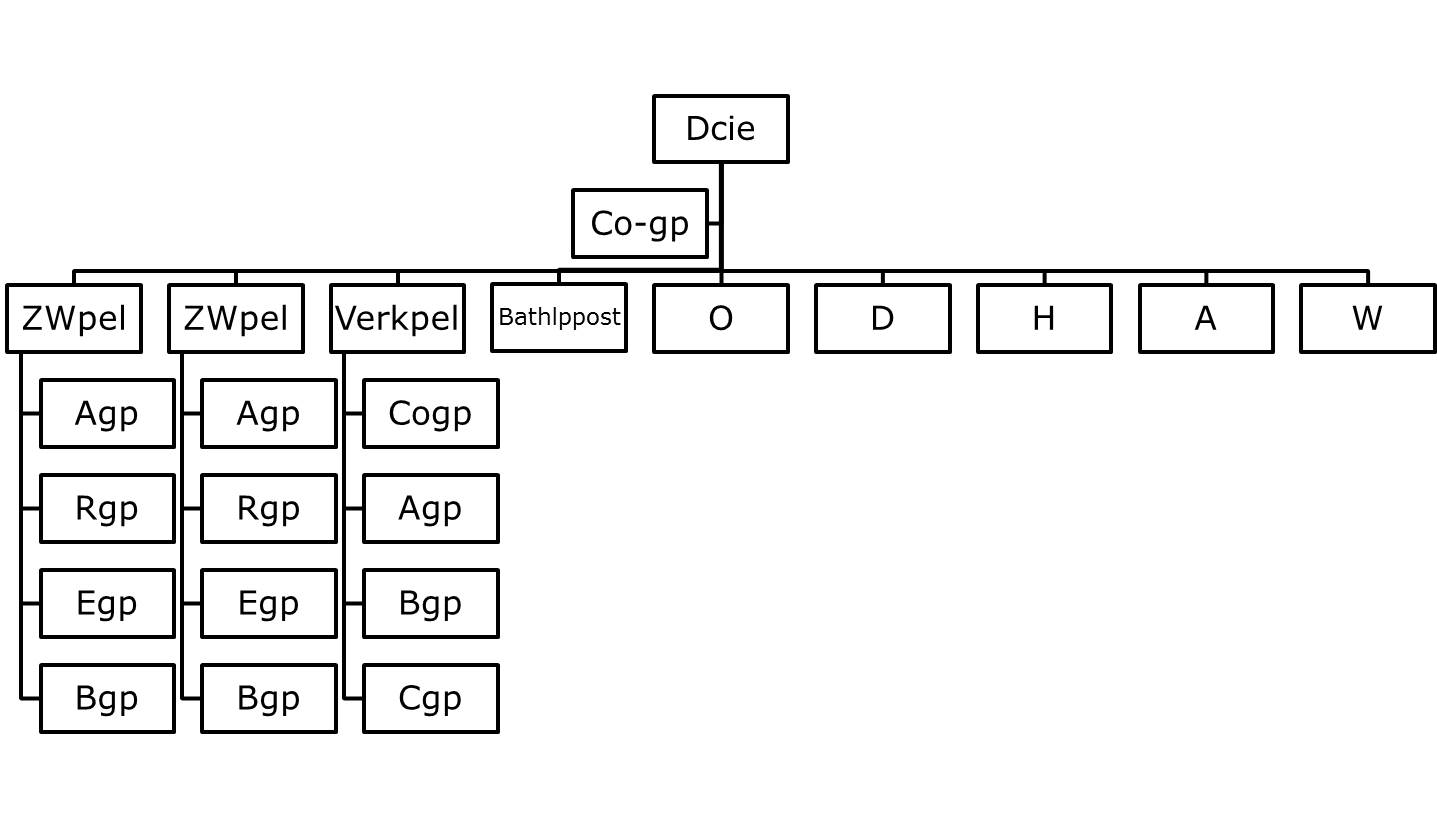
Organogram patrol company

Since 2011, the brigade has fielded patrol companies. A patrol company consists of a headquarters platoon, two patrol platoons and a reconnaissance platoon. During deployments in Afghanistan, the need for independently operating units with high mobility and firepower arose. The light Luchtmobiel Speciaal Voertuig vehicles from the former Staff/Anti-tank company were replaced by Mercedes-Benz 290GD 4x4s, awaiting the delivery of purpose-built vehicles. The MB 290GD 10 kN vehicles are manned by three, instead of two infantrymen and equipped with a Browning M2 .50 heavy machine gun as the main armament in addition to an FN MAG general-purpose machine gun used by the vehicle commander. The Spike medium-range anti-tank guided missiles are located on the back of the vehicles and can be deployed by an individual soldier. This set-up enables independent, rapid and offensive operations. An area can swiftly be dominated and stabilised.

The reconnaissance platoons function as the eyes and ears of the battalion commander. They are deployed behind enemy lines, often days before the main assault force arrives; they therefore play a crucial role as ISTAR components for the battalion and brigade headquarters. The reconnaissance troops are selected from within the active battalion and trained within the platoons, they are experts in infiltrations and close target reconnaissance. Their independent operational capacities are supported by use long-range communications and SF Medics, the latter being capable of providing prolonged field care if needed. All reconnaissance platoon troops are airborne qualified.

==== 11 Brigade Recconnaissance Squadron ====
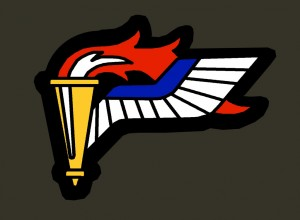
Emblem of the Pathfinders

The 11 Brigade Reconnaissance Squadron was formed in 2016 through the merger of the 103 Reconnaissance Squadron (Regiment Huzaren van Boreel) and the Pathfinder Platoon 'Madju' (Grenadiers' and Rifles Guard Regiment). The squadron is tasked with gathering intelligence to aid the planning process of the brigade (recces) and the marking of helicopter landing sites (HLS), drop zones (DZ) and landing zones (LZ) to enable brigade deployments. The squads feature integral specialists, such as snipers and communications specialists.

The Pathfinder Platoon 'Madju' was established in 2007 and is part of the 11 Brigade Reconnaissance Squadron. The Pathfinders function as the brigade's recces, in addition to being specialised in the marking of drop zones and landing zones for helicopters and paratroopers. Moreover, they are qualified to conduct Tactical Air Landing Operations and operate. The platoon operates in small squads of 6 men, all Pathfinders are military free-fall (MFF) qualified and thus capable of conducting HAHO and HALO airborne insertions.

==== 11 Engineer Company ====
The 11 Engineer Company consist of engineer reconnaissance, advanced search teams, engineer platoons and a construction squad. The company supports the brigade with mobility and counter-mobility. Mobility support enables friendly troops to maneuver unobstructed by providing Improvised Explosive Device (IED) detection and disposal, clearing minefields or constructing bridges. Counter-mobility obstructs enemy troops by creating a range of obstacles. The company operates integrated with the infantry battalions. The engineer recces have undergone scuba diving training which enables them to operate in, and the vicinity of water. The recces and advanced search teams are part of the Engineers Advanced Reconnaissance and Search (EARS) Platoon.

==== 11 Maintenance Company ====
The 11 Maintenance Company is tasked with the maintenance and repair of motorcycles, 4x4s, trucks, armament and electronics. In addition to on-base maintenance and repairs, the company is capable of fulfilling their duties in the field. Mechanics can provide battle damage repairs close to the frontline.

==== 11 Supply Company ====
The 11 Supply Company provides the timely supply of ammunition, food, water, fuel and spare parts wherever the brigade operates. The company has access to a wide variety of vehicles for its tasks, ranging from large trucks and forklifts to the Luchtmobiel Speciaal Voertuig. In addition, the company is tasked with managing the deployment of the brigade to areas of operations. The company has recently played a significant role in the innovation of parachute supply (cargo delivery airdrops) which did not yet exist within the Netherlands Armed Forces. It is the only independent supply company outside of the non-integrated supply battalions.

==== 11 Medical Company ====
11 Medical Company consists of a company staff, a logistic platoon and three medical platoons. The company provides all emergency, curative and preventive medical care to the brigade. A significant share of the company assets are transportable by air.

==== 20 National Reserve Battalion ====
20 National Reserve Battalion came under the command of the 11th Airmobile Brigade in 2012. A Colonel of the western regional military command is part of the brigade staff and commands national operations in the provinces of North Holland, South Holland en Utrecht, which are all part of the area of responsibility of the 11th Airmobile Brigade. The A and D Company are based in The Hague, the B Company in Bergen, the C Company in Amsterdam, the E Company in Stroe and the F Company in Schaarsbergen

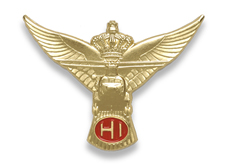
Helicopter Instructor

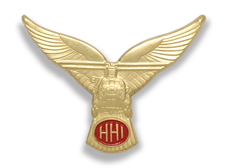
Helicopter Handling Instructor

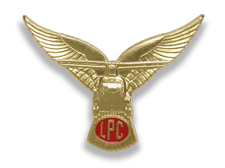
Landing Point Commander

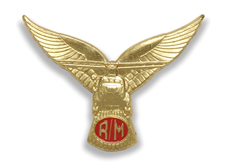
Rigger Marshaller

== Commanders ==
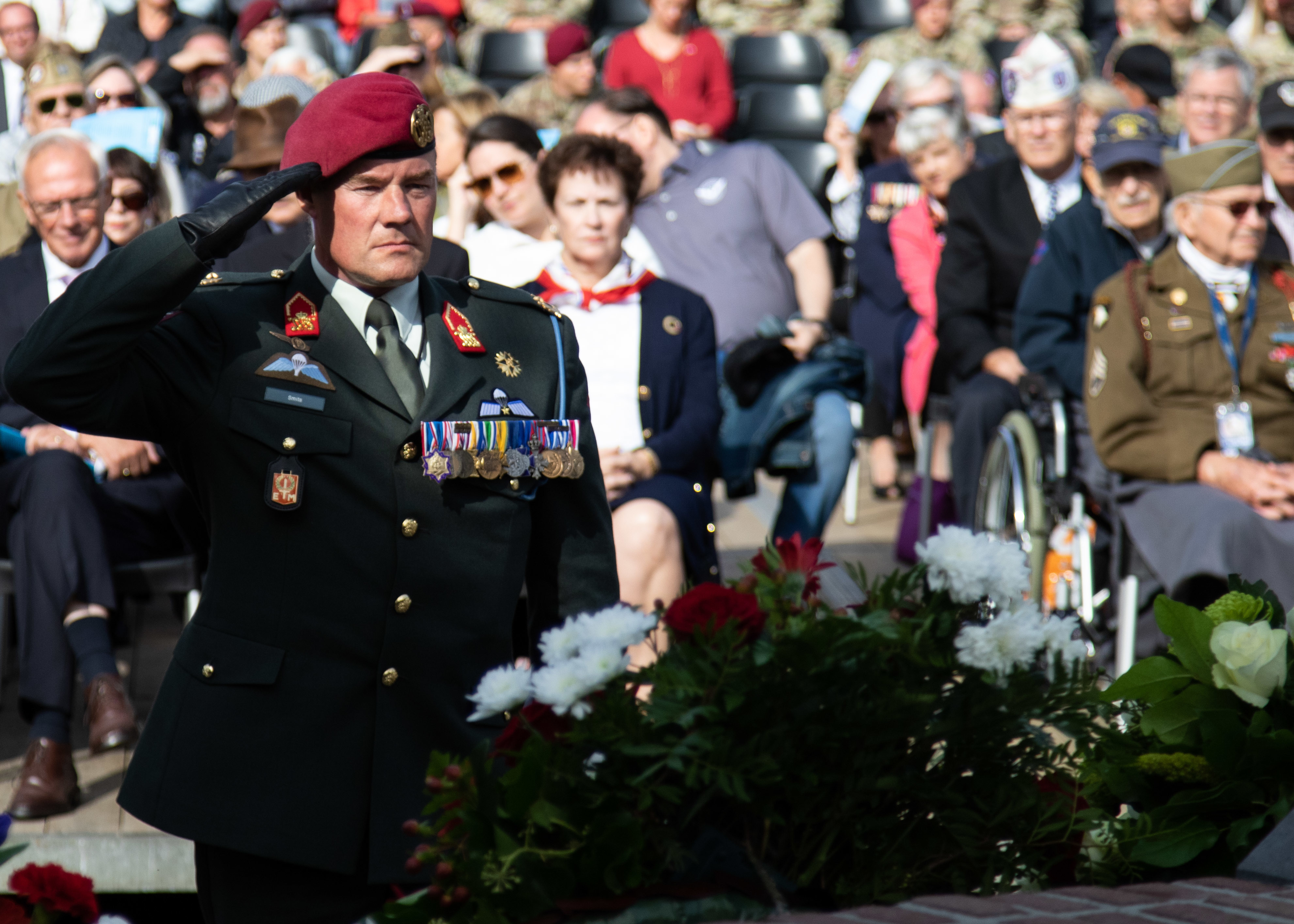
Brigade general Ron Smits, former brigade commander

Below follows a list of the brigade's commanders:

- 1990 – 1993: Brigadier General L.G. Dijkstra
- 1993 – 1995: Brigadier General Jan Willem Brinkman
- 1995 – 1996: Brigadier General G.J.M. Bastiaans
- 1996 – 1998: Brigadier General J.R. Karssing
- 1998 – 2000: Brigadier General Rein van Vels
- 2000 – 2001: Brigadier General Leen Noordzij
- 2001 – 2003: Brigadier General Peter van Uhm
- 2003 – 2006: Brigadier General Koen Gijsbers
- 2006 – 2010: Brigadier General Marc van Uhm
- 2009 – 2010: Colonel Willy Brons (temporary commander during Afghanistan deployment of Marc van Uhm)
- 2010 – 2011: Brigadier General Otto van Wiggen
- 2012 – 2014: Brigadier General Nico Geerts
- 2014 – 2017: Brigadier General Kees Matthijssen
- 2017 – 2021: Brigadier General Ron Smits
- 2021–2024: Brigadier General Cas Schreurs MSc
- 2024–present: Brigadier General Frank Grandia EMSD
