= Luchtmobiel Speciaal Voertuig =

Military off-road vehicle

Luchtmobiel Speciaal Voertuig (LSV)
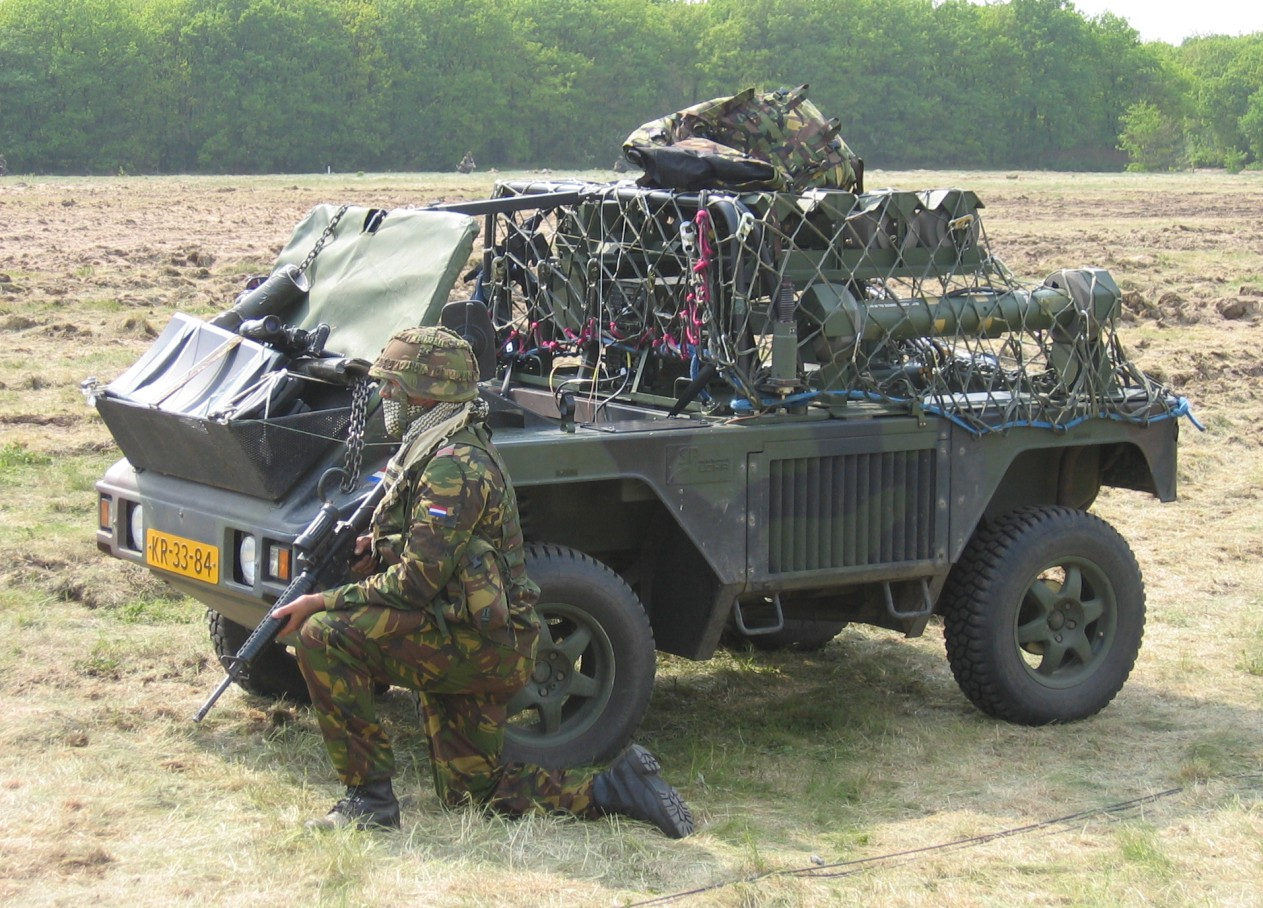
- Royal Netherlands Army LSV
- Type: Multipurpose wheeled vehicle
- Place of origin: France, Netherlands

Service history
- In service: 1998–present
- Used by: Royal Netherlands Army
- Wars: Afgan War (2001-2021); Iraq War (2003-2011)

Production history
- Designer: Lohr Industrie
- Designed: 1991–1994
- Manufacturer: SP Aerospace and Vehicle Systems
- Unit cost: ƒ100k per unit
- Produced: 1996–2001
- No. built: 208

Specifications
- Mass: 1.4 tonnes
- Length: 3.34 m
- Width: 1.81 m
- Height: 1.78 m
- Crew: 2
- Engine: 4 cylinder Peugeot diesel 51 kW
- Suspension: 4 wheel drive
- Operational range: 700 km
- Maximum speed: 70 km/h

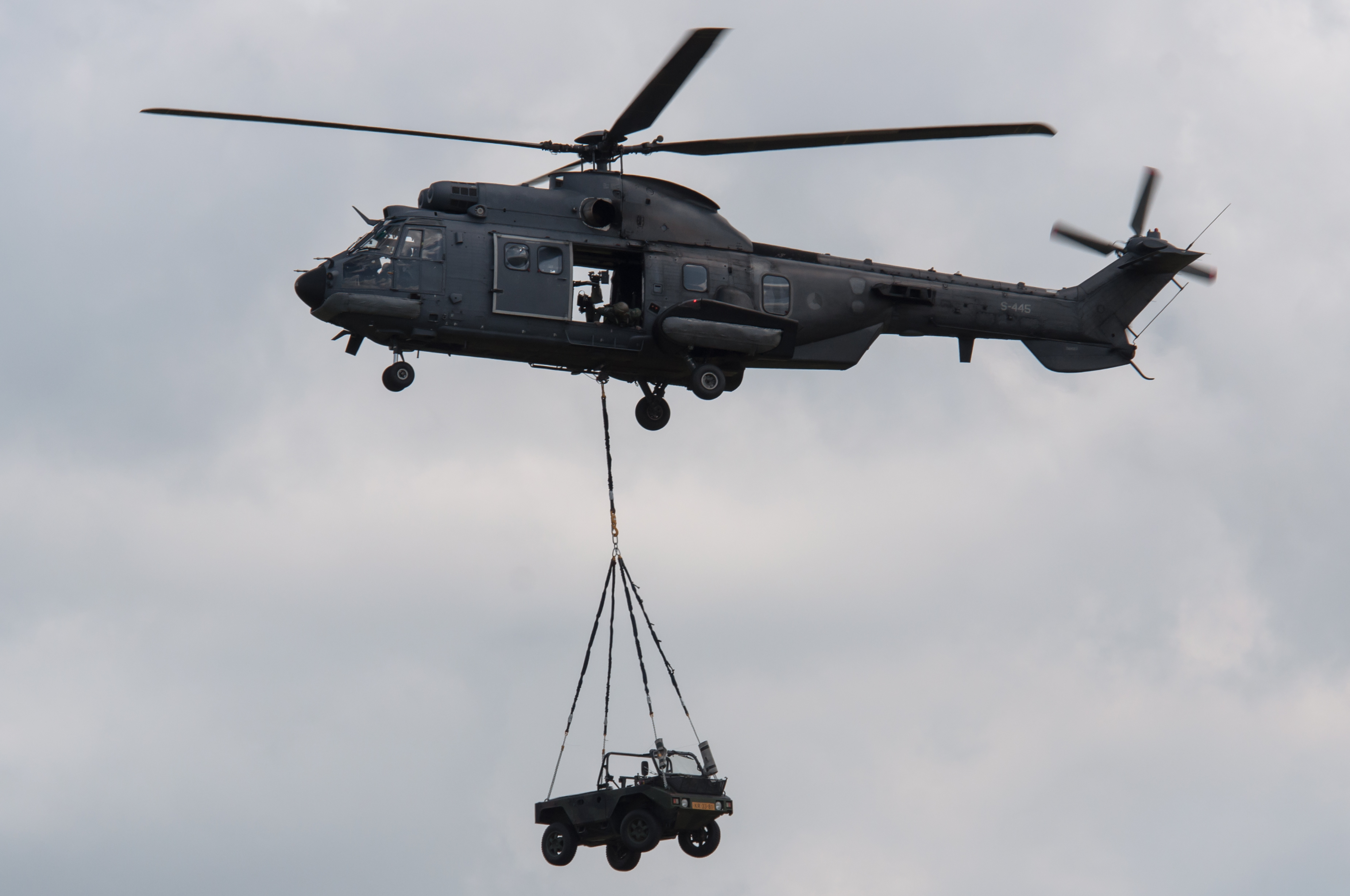
Helicopter hauls a LSV, 2014

The Luchtmobiel Speciaal Voertuig (LSV) is a small, open off-road vehicle that can be transported by air. It is specifically designed for, and used by, the Dutch Airmobile Brigade of the Royal Netherlands Army. The LSV is nicknamed affectionately 'playmobiel' (Playmobil) by Dutch soldiers. The vehicle is designed to be transported by helicopters, and had three main variants: One for medical transport, anti-tank, and a general purpose one. The vehicle served the Dutch army for two decades and is in the process of being replaced by a new a light vehicle, although in the later years it was supplemented by the G280 CDI.

== History ==
With the establishment of the airmobile brigade on 1 May 1992, a need arose for specific equipment for this new unit. For example, a vehicle was needed to provide the brigade with mobility on the ground and to be able to be transported in or under a transport helicopter. This multifunctional vehicle was named 'Luchtmobiel Speciaal Voertuig', which can be roughly translated into 'Airmobile Special Vehicle'. The weight of this vehicle was of great importance because otherwise the range and the loading capacity of the helicopter were to be severely limited. During the procurement process several designs were presented by a range of companies. After a first selection, four candidates remained:

- "Cobra" of the British Longline
- The British "Saker" of Wessex
- The "A3" of Auverland from France
- "Véhicule Légère Aeromobile" of the French Lohr

However, none of the vehicles available on the market in 1994 could meet the weight requirement of 1200 kg. Therefore, the requirement was adjusted to 1400 kg. After further tests, the "Véhicule Légère Aeromobile" from the French manufacturer Lohr proved to meet the adjusted requirements and Defense therefore opted for this vehicle. Since the intention of the Royal Netherlands Army was to put the vehicles into use during the preparations of the brigade (in the period 1992–1994), the project was delayed considerably. As an interim solution, the brigade used open Mercedes-Benz off-road vehicles of type GD-290.

In 1996 the order for the LSV was finally placed. The vehicles were produced under license in the Netherlands by SP Aerospace and Vehicle systems. The first copies were delivered at the end of 1998. The Mechanic Central Workshop of the Army then implemented the conversion of the vehicles into specific AT or GWT execution. The last LSV was delivered at the beginning of 2001.

In 2023, a contract was signed to buy the VECTOR light airborne vehicle to replace the LSV. The VECTOR can be carried internally or externally like the LSV from the Dutch heavy-lift helicopter. Previously, the 11th Airmobile had also used the Mercedes-Benz G280 CDI, so the VECTOR replaced both the LSV and that type. In addition, a military grade 4x4 quad called the MDQ was acquired starting in 2020.

== Design ==
The vehicle consists of a tubular frame with a polyester body, it has two seats and an open load area. It does not have a crumple zone and is therefore perceived as unsafe under peace conditions. The LSV has an automatic gearbox and a permanent all-wheel drive. The engine is from Peugeot.

The vehicle designed to be carried by helicopters more easily.

== Types ==
There are 3 types of the Luchtmobiel Special Voertuig (LSV) in use by the Royal Netherlands Army:

- General service (AG), which are used, for example, for the transport of connecting means and ammunition;
- Wounded transport (GWT), used for transporting wounded soldiers or civilians;
- Anti-tank (AT), these are used for transporting anti-tank weapons and the associated ammunition.

== Operators ==
=== Current operators ===
- Netherlands: Royal Netherlands Army

11th Airmobile Brigade – 160 vehicles, to be replaced in 2024.

== Images ==
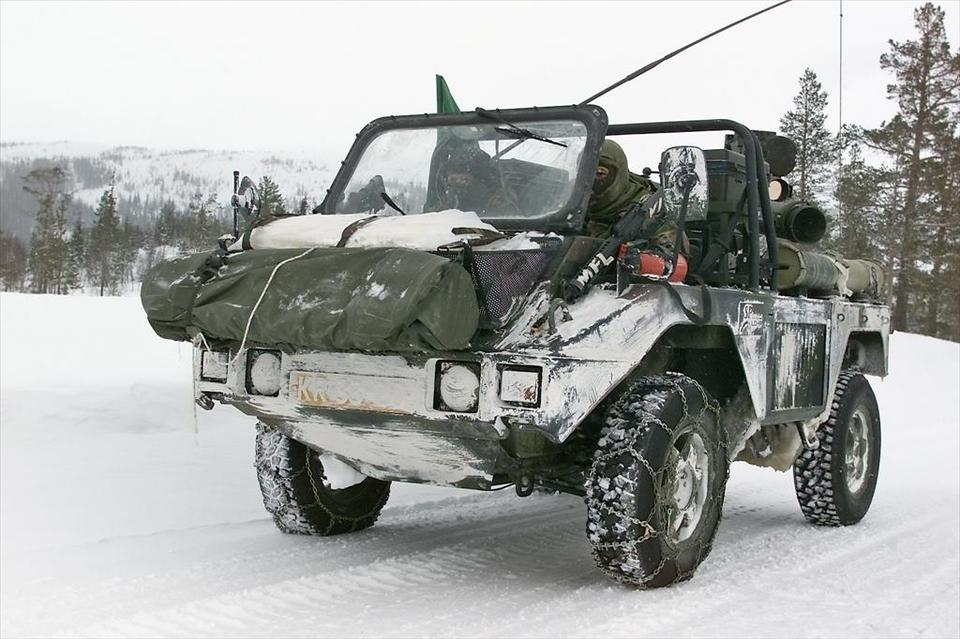
LSV (AT version) in the snow

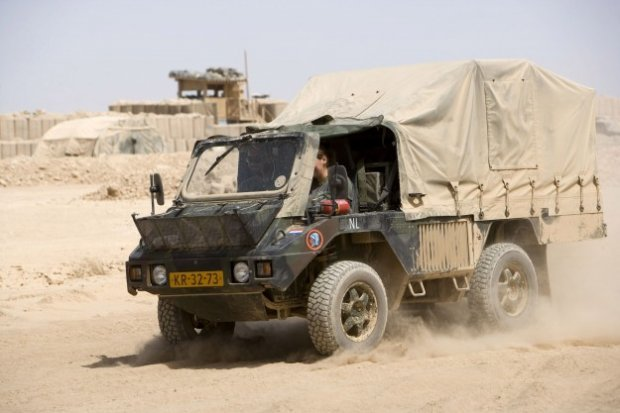
LSV ISAF

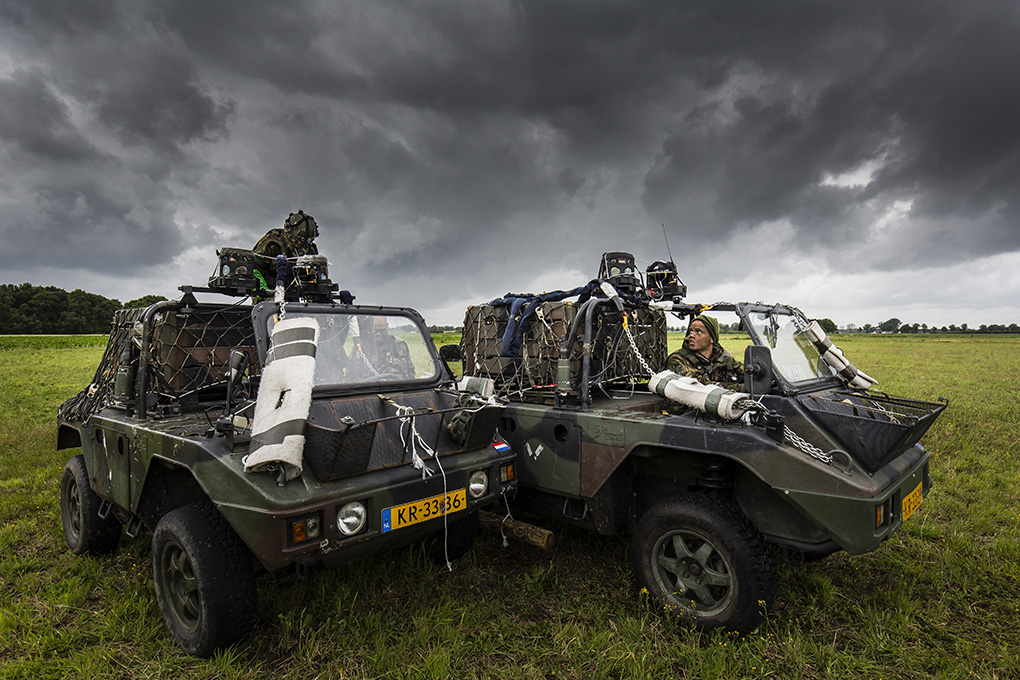
Two LSV's tactical loaded

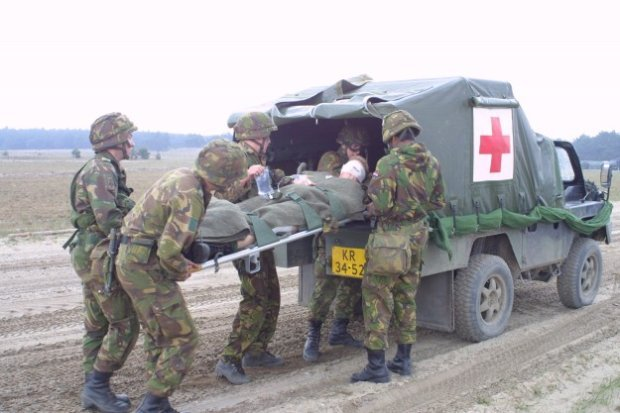
LSV GWT

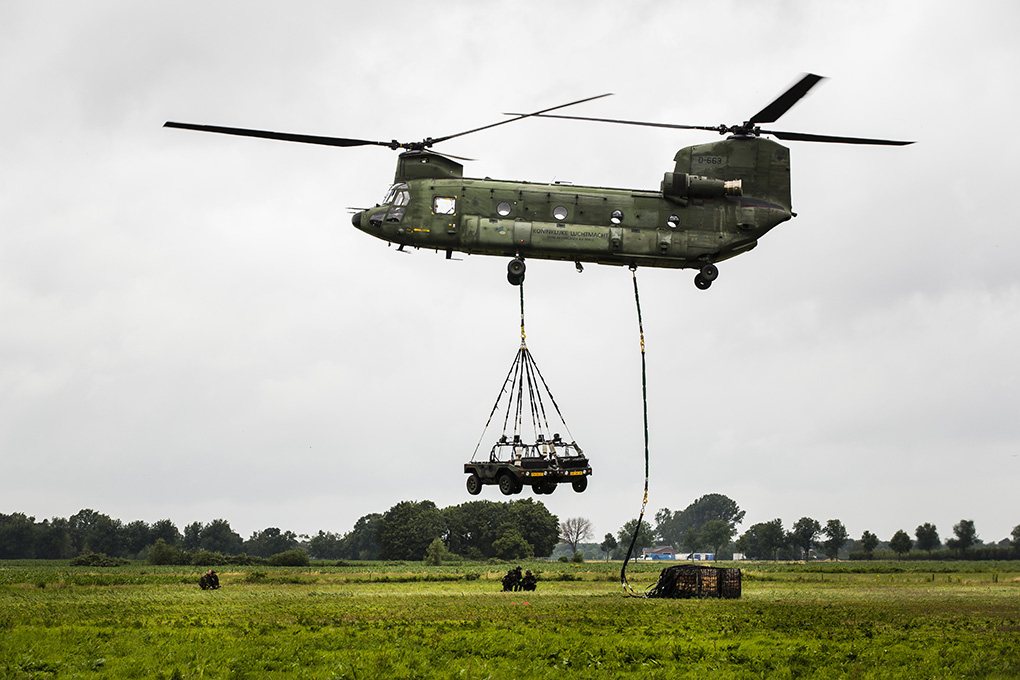
Chinook with two LSV's and other burden

== See also ==
- 11th Airmobile Brigade
- VECTOR (Light vehicle)
- Land Rover 1/2 ton Lightweight (Another vehicle designed for carry by helicopter)
- M422 Mighty Mite (another air-mobile vehicle for helis)
