= M422 Mighty Mite =

U.S. military 4x4 utility truck

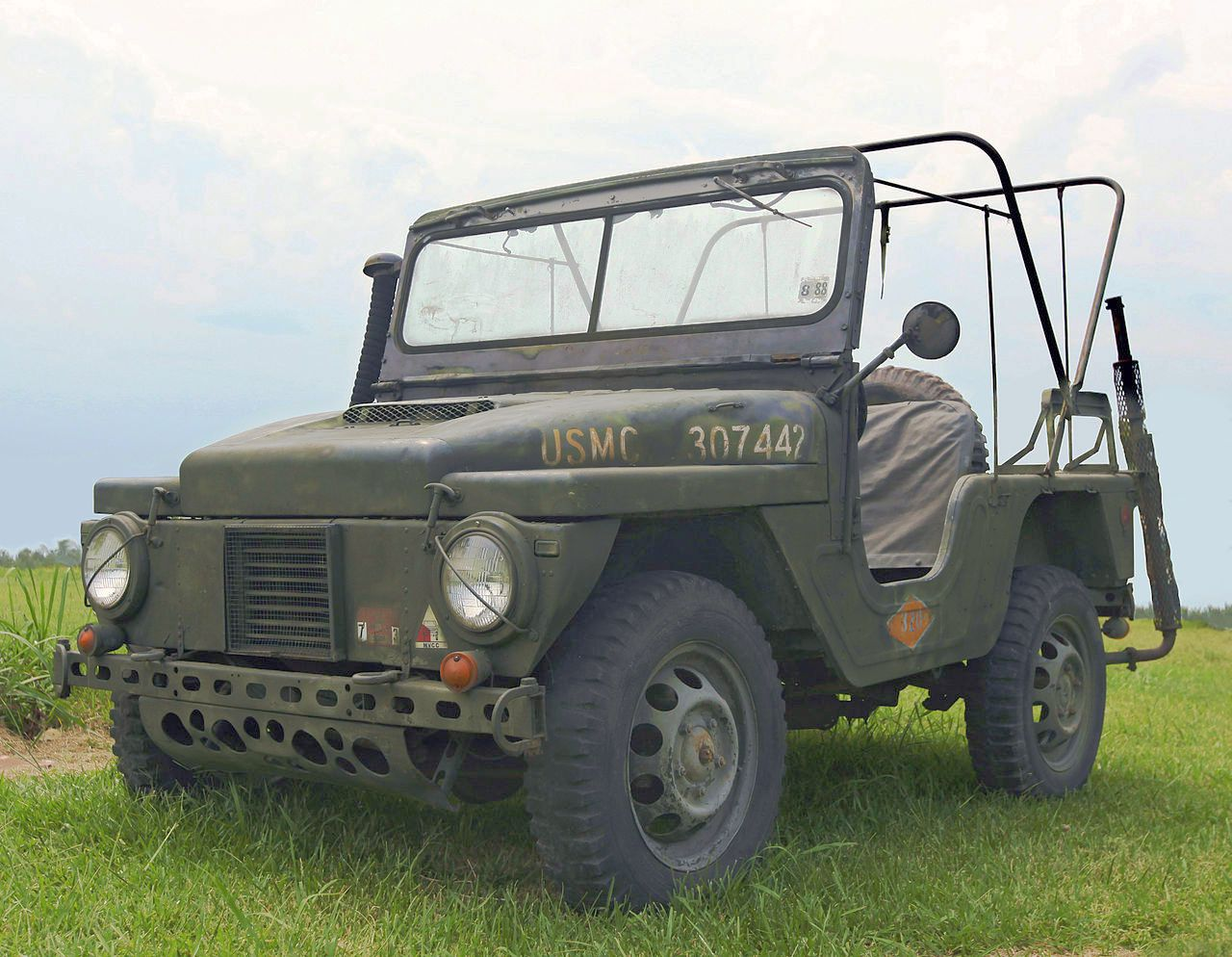
- Initial series M422, with 65-inch wheelbase
- Type: 1/4 ton (227 kg) 4x4 utility truck
- Place of origin: United States

Production history
- Manufacturer: American Motors Corporation
- Produced: 1959–1962
- No. built: 1,250 (+ 2,672 M422A1)
- Variants: M422A1

Specifications
- Mass: 1,700 lb (770 kg) empty
- Length: 107 in (2.72 m)
- Width: 61 in (1.55 m)
- Height: 59 in (1.50 m)
- Engine: 107.8 cu in (1.8 L); 55 hp (41 kW)
- Suspension: independent with leaf springs
- Operational range: 225 mi (362.1 km)
- Maximum speed: 62 mph (100 km/h)

The AMC M422 'Mighty Mite', or G-843 by its supply catalog designation, is an extra lightweight ¼-ton 4x4 tactical truck, designed for the United States Marine Corps, to be suitable for helicopter airlift and manhandling. It is noted for its exceptionally short length, and resulting very tight turning circle, while still highway approved for a top speed of 55 mph (89 km/h) (U.S. military), and capable of 65 mph (105 km/h) according to its manufacturer, American Motors Corporation (AMC). From 1959 through 1962, just under 4,000 M422 Mighty Mites were built by American Motors for the U.S. Marines.

== History ==
During World War II, many prototypes were already developed for a 1/4‑ton jeep, which was still significantly lighter and more compact than the U.S. Army's lightest, all-terrain, all-purpose vehicle at the time, the Willys 1/4‑ton Jeep. They were intended for transport in small (glider) aircraft and such, but none went into production. However, after the war, a self-taught engineer, pilot, and auto racer, Ben F. Gregory, conceived a mini-jeep design and built a successful prototype, later named the "MM-100".

The Mighty Mite was first conceived between 1946 and 1947, by a self-taught engineer, pilot, and auto racer from Missouri, Ben F. Gregory. Gregory designed several front-wheel drive cars after World War I, but was unsuccessful in marketing them. He turned to commercial aviation, but a crash in 1942 ended his flying career. Recovering from serious injuries, he became an aircraft inspector. After the end of World War II, Gregory found new investors. He turned again to front-drive cars, this time culminating in a fully driveable prototype—an innovative 1947 rear-engined, front-drive compact car, the Gregory Sedan. No carmaker was interested in his car, but he was inspired to use some of its design features, such as leading- and trailing-arms suspension, in a more modern four-wheel drive off-road vehicle, or jeep, and he found additional investors willing to fund a prototype.

One investor arranged a 1951 demonstration for the United States Marine Corps (USMC) Equipment Board, which went so well that the investors quickly formed the Mid-America Research Corporation (MARCO) to develop the vehicle for military or commercial markets. That same year, MARCO presented it as the MARCO MM-100, making it the first clean-sheet 1/4‑ton vehicle to be designed for the U.S. military after World War II. The USMC executed a contract for ten test vehicles in August 1951. The vehicles were delivered in December 1952, and the USMC began the test program. For further development, the company decided to hire Harold Crist, American Bantam's original chief engineer on designing the original Bantam BRC, on which Willys MB multi-role vehicle was based. Joining on 1 January 1953 as project manager, Crist brought with him three of the main people who had worked on the original Bantam vehicle: Chet Hempfling, Ralph Turner, and Frank McMillan. From that point, the team included four of the original WW II vehicle engineers. But Gregory, in turn, was eventually forced out of the company.

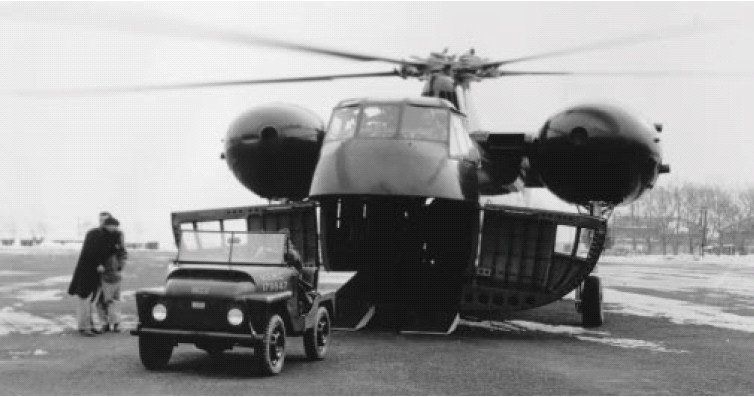
HR2S-1 Deuce (H-37) with M422, it could carry up to three Mites

The MM-100 used a 44 hp (33 kW), 79 cu in (1.3 L) flat-four engine from the "S" version of the Porsche 356, but this choice proved problematic, as using a foreign-built engine would violate regulations requiring U.S.-built equipment in U.S. military vehicles. Attempts were made to substitute the Lycoming O-145, an American aircraft engine, but it was deemed too expensive and difficult to adapt to a ground vehicle. A solution presented itself when MARCO discovered that American Motors Corporation (AMC) was developing a lightweight, air-cooled 50 hp (37 kW), 95 cu in (1.6 L) V4 engine for a proposed economy car to be sold under AMC's Nash Motors brand. AMC quickly became interested in the MM-100 because it needed a new product to keep a former Hudson commercial vehicle plant operating. By 1954, AMC had completely taken over the project.

Problems were encountered with the designers' decision to save weight by not using a conventional exhaust system. The prototype did not have a muffler or pipe – rather the exhaust was routed through some frame tubes. This design was inferior because the condensation and acidic fumes caused premature frame failure. There was a competing prototype built by Willys, the 1953 Bobcat or "Aero Jeep", which was to share as many parts as possible with the M38 and M38A1 to save costs. However, the Willys version was rejected in favor of the more advanced M422. In April 1958, AMC and the USMC executed a contract for delivery of 250 production M422 vehicles contingent upon successful trials of the first seven.

The vehicle was intended to be liftable, underslung the strongest helicopters of the era, the Sikorski H-19 being the benchmark. Although the vehicle was to be used only by the U.S. Marine Corps, it was evident from the beginning that production numbers would remain limited, (Note: For comparison: during WW II, the Army ordered some 80,000 half-ton Dodge WC series trucks for 1941 alone, while the Marine Corps, a smaller and much more specialized U.S. defense branch, ordered a total of 1,123 International M-1-4 trucks from International Harvester.) the vehicle was extensively engineered and incorporated many innovations.

== Engineering ==
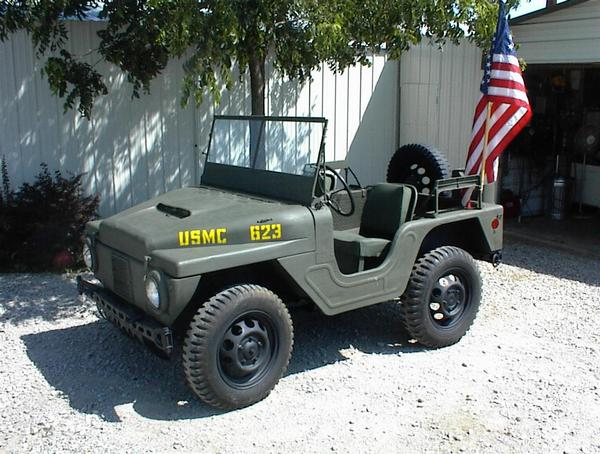
M422 Mighty Mite, 65-inch wheelbase with the early thin windshield

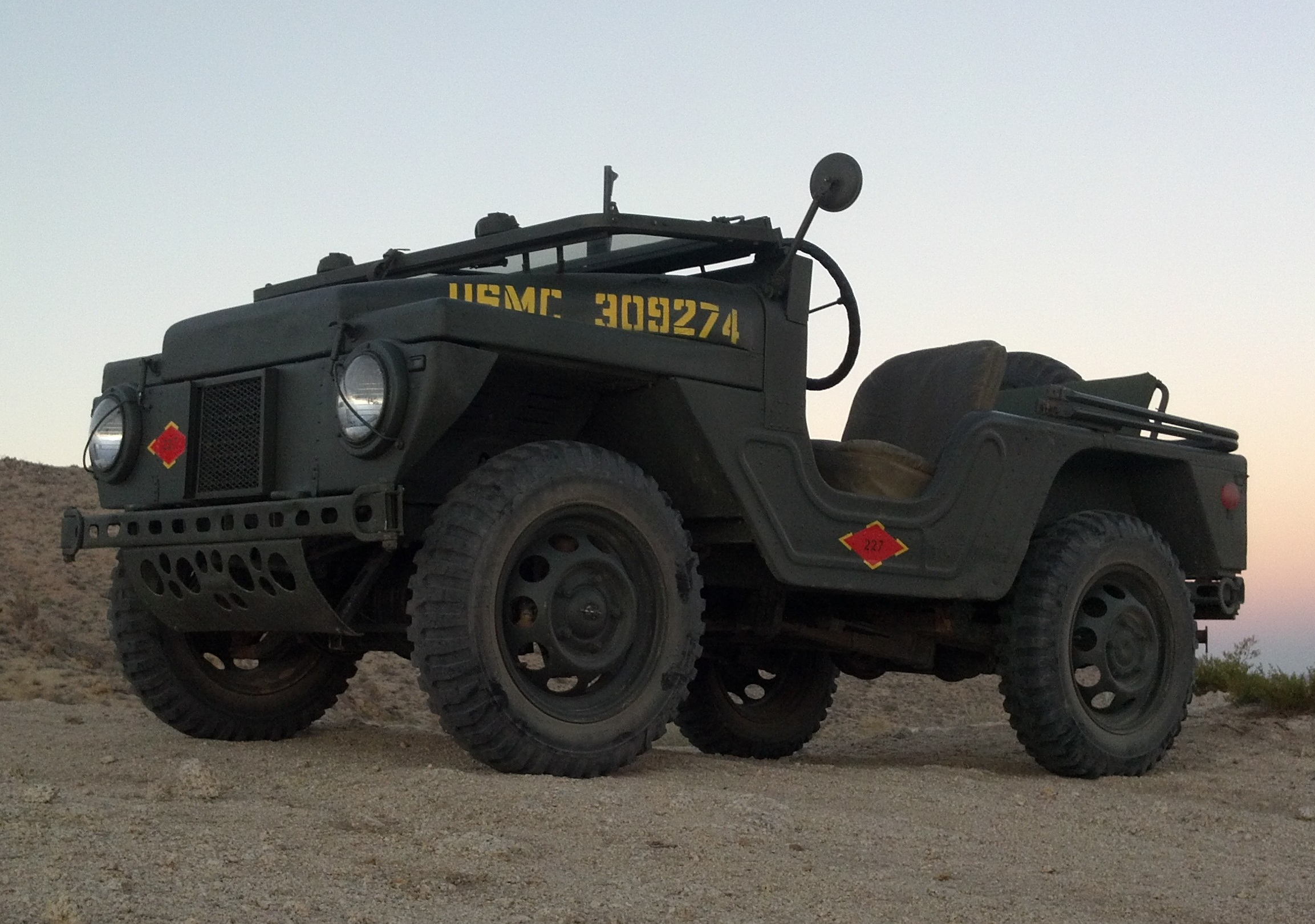
M422A1 Mighty Mite, 71-inch wheelbase

Gregory car and M422 suspension
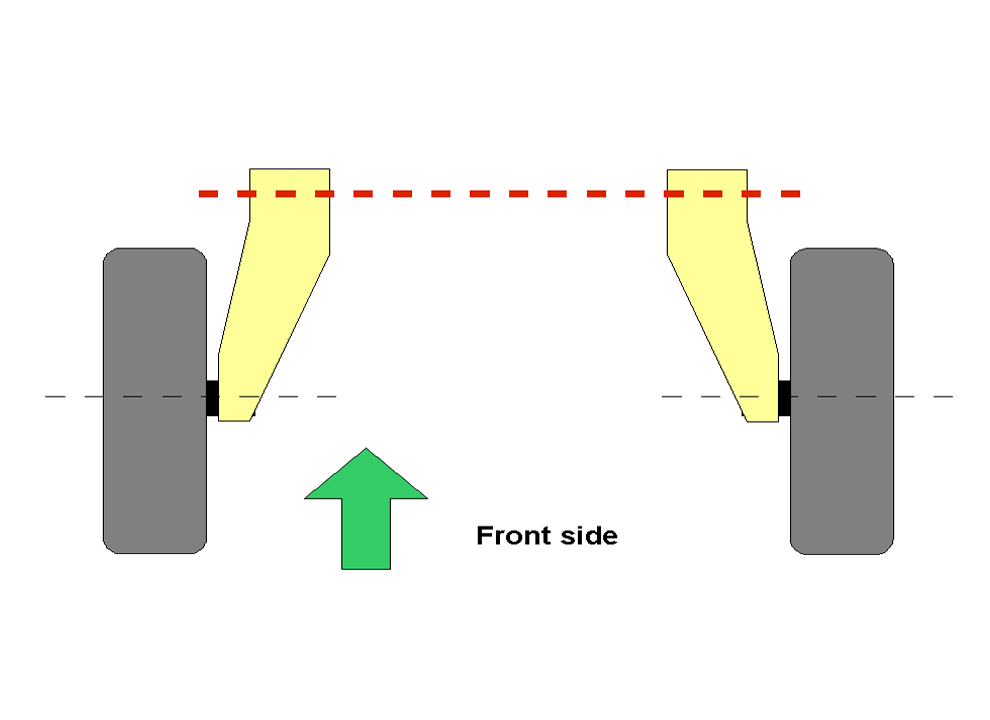
- Gregory's designs cantilever ¼-elliptic leaf-springs, clamped to the hinged base of each arm, extending inwards, opposite to each arm's length from its hinges to the wheel-hubs
- The Gregory Sedan's plan view (bottom left) shows the car's 4-wheel independent suspension, using leading- and trailing-arm suspension, with the front-wheels' leading-arms laid closer to the car's center-line.
- Photo of a correctly detailed M422 scale model, showing the space-use under its floor, with the front arms' ¼-elliptic leaf-springs laid inside those of the rear trailing-arms

To keep the weight low, the M422 became the first U.S. jeep fitted with an aluminum body. At 1,700 pounds (771 kg), it is the lightest conventional U.S. military truck to date. Also, this was the first U.S. small military vehicle designed with independent suspension all around (front: leading arms/trailing arms rear), sprung by ¼-elliptical leaf springs. Among the M422's many unique features were front and rear limited-slip differentials, inboard differential mounted drum brakes, center-point steering, and the aluminum "AMC AV-108-4" V4 engine developed by American Motors. The air-cooled 107.8 cu in (1.8 L) developed 52 bhp (39 kW) and 90 lb⋅ft (122 N⋅m) of torque, which propelled the vehicle to a top speed of 65 miles per hour (105 km/h), with a 55-mile-per-hour (89 km/h) military rating. As with the M151, the single-speed transfer case only engages/disengages the front wheel drive and is part of the transmission. The full-synchronization meant it could be shifted from two-wheel drive to four-wheel drive on the fly.

Although a two-seater, the little vehicle could theoretically move six people. There were no conventional rear seats. Instead, the two additional seats are integrated into the functional tailgate, and two small folding backrests are placed on the top of the rear fenders. Additionally, the M422 was rated to carry 850 lb (390 kg) off-road, while all other standard military 1/4‑ton vehicles (even the M151) were rated at 800 lb (363 kg).

There was a version of the M416 trailer specially adapted for towing by an M422: the M416B1. Early production M416B1 came with magnesium M151 wheels, that later switched to steel wheels as on the M422. Other features included USMC lifting rings and holders in front of the fenders to store aluminum water cans.

Like other Marine Corps contract vehicles, the M422s came from the factory with all deep-water fording equipment installed, except for the pipes. In its early development stage the Marines developed a lightweight flotation kit that could easily be stored on the M422 when not in need, in which four large tubes inflated by exhaust encompassed the bottom part of the frame that allowed the vehicle to swim deeper waters. The vehicle's spinning wheels provided propulsion and steering in the water.

In 1958, seven prototypes passed grueling tests, and the first 250 vehicles were built by American Motors. These units went into mass production in 1960, and AMC built 3,922 Mighty Mites through 1962 for the U.S. Marine Corps. Over the years, the vehicle was produced in two model versions: the M422 and M422A1. The M422 had a short 65-inch (1,700 mm) wheelbase. After production of 1,045 units, the Mighty Mite evolved into the M422A1, 6 inches (152 mm) longer in both wheelbase and overall length, as well as 80 pounds (36 kg) heavier. The first Mighty Mites with the 71-inch wheelbase were experimental models built from production M422s. They had an extended frame and aluminum bracing added behind the seat as well as crudely fashioned tool storage boxes. This model was the M422E1, of which only a few were made. Once put into production, the longer wheelbase model was designated the M422A1 and featured a reinforcing rib on the rear fender forward of the wheel opening.

The M422 came with 6.00-16 NDT tires on steel wheels. The vehicles did not come from the factory with spare tires, but kits were later produced that could be added. However, the rear-mounted spare tires rendered the tailgate unusable. There is no provision for a gas can carrier. Either model could be fitted with a sturdier windshield similar to the Willys M38A1 that, along with top bows, would facilitate using a canvas winter top.

At over US$5,000 per unit (equivalent to $55,200 in 2025), it was relatively expensive. Development and certification of the M422 took through 1959. When the M422 debuted, it coincided with the adoption of helicopters like the Bell UH-1 "Huey" with much more carrying capacity than the Marine Corps' Sikorsky HRS with its 2,650-pound (1,202 kg) cargo limit (including crew and fuel), for which the M422 had been developed. Except for parachute airdrops, the vehicle became obsolete. These factors quickly rendered the Mite an outmoded, redundant supply chain complication, more expensive and largely less capable than a regular 1/4‑ton Jeep, which accounts for the short production period, as well as the small production total.

Dimensions and weights
	M422	M422A1
Wheelbase	65 in (1,651 mm)	71 in (1,803 mm)
Length	107 in (2,718 mm)	113 in (2,870 mm)
Width	60 in (1,524 mm)	
Weight	1,700 lb (771 kg)	1,780 lb (807 kg)

== See also ==
- Crosley Farm-O-Road, a 1950 jeep-like, highway-legal utility vehicle that was under ten feet long
- The British Royal Navy equivalent in the same period was to use Citroën 2CV pickup trucks.
- Land Rover 1/2 ton Lightweight – a 1960s British lightweight military vehicle designed for helicopter carriage
- Luchtmobiel Speciaal Voertuig – a 1990s Netherlands lightweight military vehicle designed for helicopter carriage
- M1301 Infantry Squad Vehicle – 2020s USA lightweight military vehicle for aircraft carriage

== General references ==
- Crismon, Fred W. (2001). US Military Wheeled Vehicles (Third ed.). Victory WWII Publishers. pp. 221–222. ISBN 0-970056-71-0.
- Doyle, David (2003). Standard catalog of U.S. Military Vehicles. Krause Publications. pp. 40–42. ISBN 0-87349-508-X.
- Doyle, David (2011). Standard catalog of U.S. Military Vehicles (Second ed.). Krause Publications. pp. 37–39. ISBN 978-1-44022-799-8.
- Ware, Pat (2010). The World Encyclopedia of Military Vehicles. Lorenz Books. p. 221. ISBN 978-0-7548-2052-9.
