= Land Rover 1/2 ton Lightweight =

British military vehicle

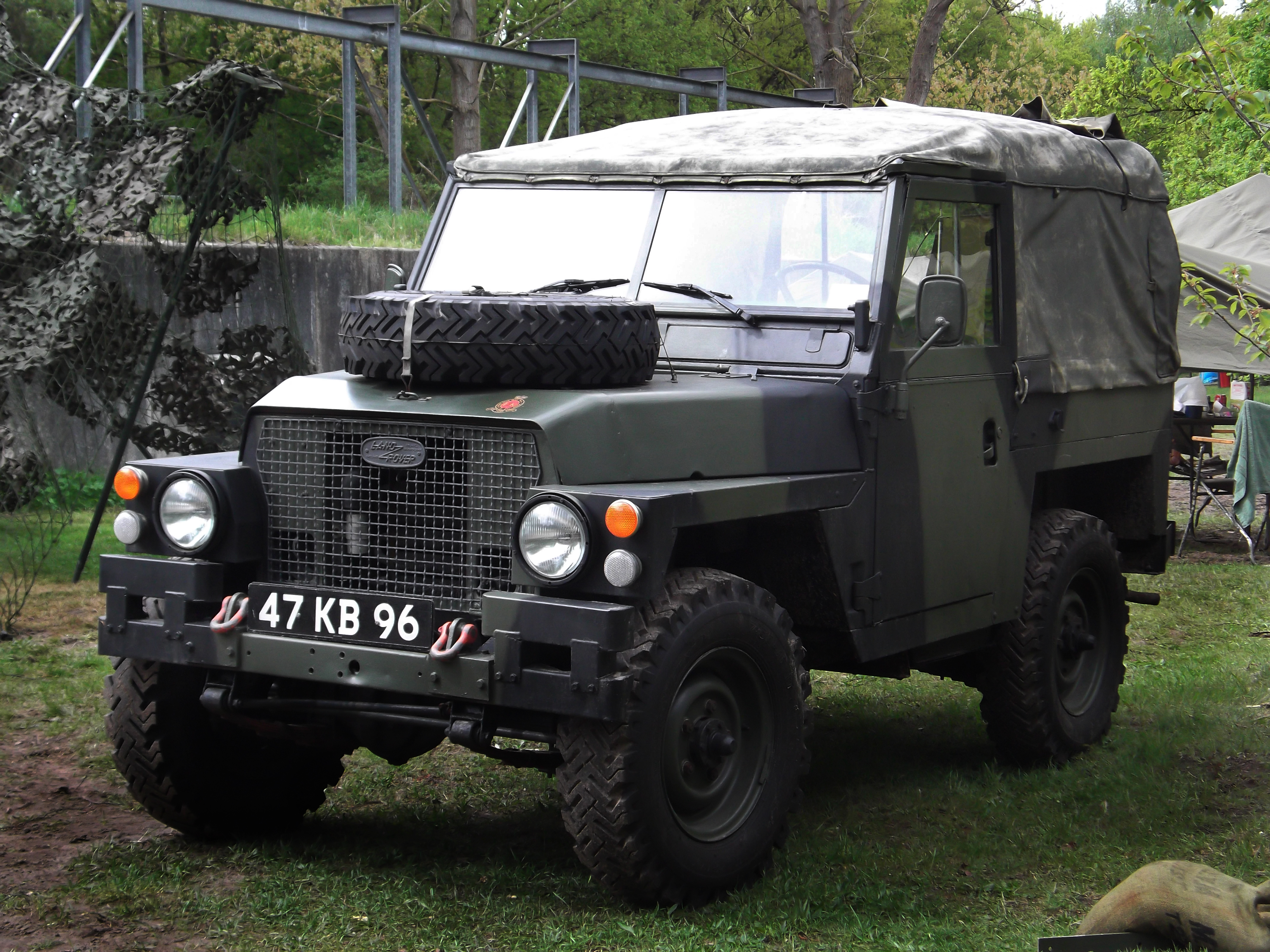

Overview
- Manufacturer: British Leyland (1968–1978); Land Rover Ltd. (1978–1984)
- Production: November 1968 – 1984
- Assembly: United Kingdom: Solihull (Solihull plant)

Body and chassis
- Class: Off-road vehicle
- Layout: FR layout / All-wheel drive
- Related: Land Rover Series

Powertrain
- Engine: 2.25 L 73 hp (54 kW) I4 (Petrol); 2.25 L 62 hp (46 kW) I4 (Diesel)
- Transmission: 4-speed manual

The Lightweight 1/2 ton was a British military vehicle supplied by Land Rover. It was a vehicle designed to be light enough to be carried by the Westland Wessex, a medium-lift helicopter in service for over 40 years with the U.K armed services.

It was produced from 1968 to 1984, and served widely internationally and in private use.

== History ==
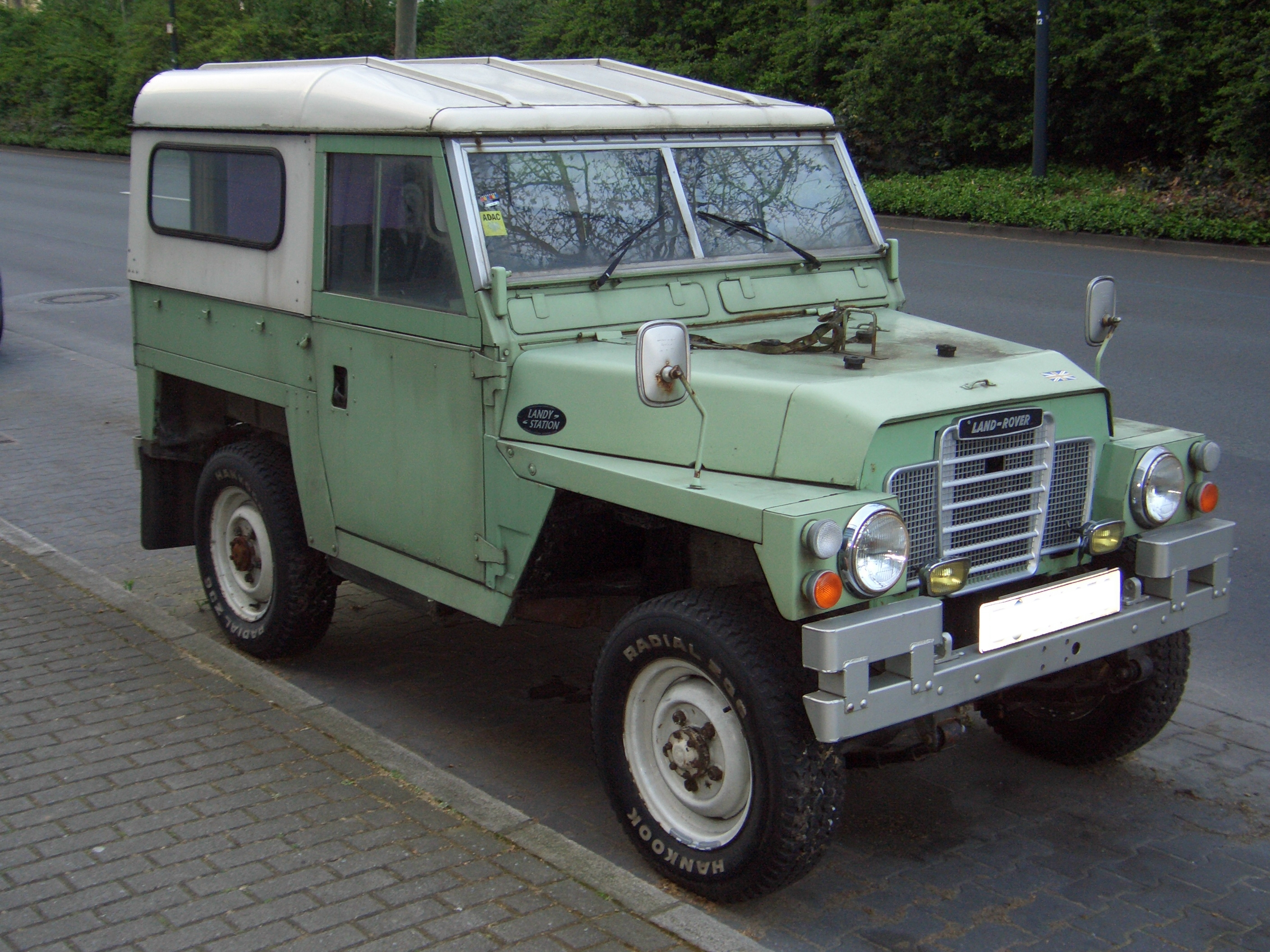
Land Rover Series III Lightweight 1972-1984, shown here in 2008

In the early 1960s both the Royal Marines, then largely based aboard commando carriers, and the British Army required a vehicle that could be carried by air to replace the Austin Champ. They had taken delivery of the Westland Wessex helicopter, which could carry a 2,500 lb (1,134 kg) load slung beneath.

The smallest Land Rover available at the time was a Series IIA 88 inch (2235 mm) wheelbase, which was too heavy. Land Rover began work on a lightweight version to fit the specifications in 1965. A new modification to the basic Series IIA was devised by making many body components easily detachable and removing many non-essential items. The result was the Land Rover Half-Ton, known widely as the Lightweight or Airportable. In practice, to reduce weight sufficiently for the helicopters of the day to lift them in combat conditions, the tilt (roof) and sticks, the upper parts of the body, the doors and windscreen were removed, to be refitted later. The most significant change, however, was a reduction in width by 4 inch (100 mm), by redesigning the standard Series IIA axles and fitting shorter half-shafts, which meant it would fit on a standard pallet.

Complete, the 24 Volt FFR Lightweight IIA had an unladen weight of 3,329 lb (1,510 kg), which was over the specified weight. The term Lightweight appears misleading as a standard 88 Land Rover weighed 1,318 kg (2,906 lb), but the higher total weight was due to the various frame reinforcement required for military usage. However, with the removable body panels taken-off it the 24 Volt FFR weighed 2,808 lb (1,274 kg) below the limit. Since improvements to the helicopters, i.e., introduction of the turbine-powered Wessex variants, meant more lift was available, the MoD accepted it for use. The main applications were actually to be shipped by cargo aircraft or stacked on railway wagons, with helicopter transport a rare occurrence.

The first production models were completed on 11 November 1968, and production continued until 1984.

== Production ==
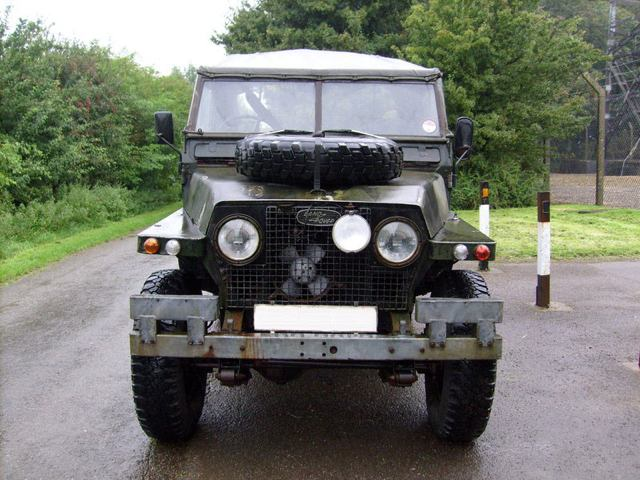
1970 Series IIa

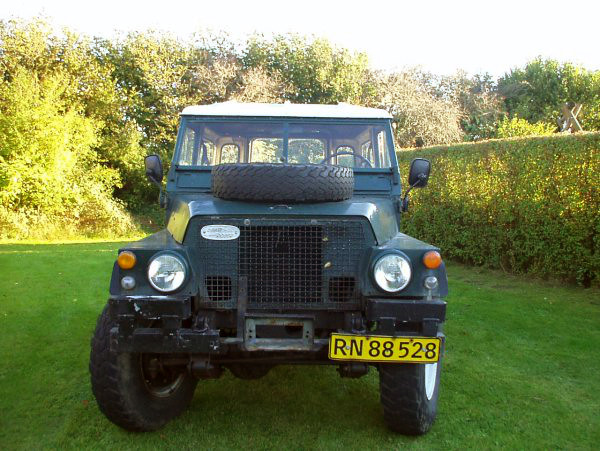
1983 Series III HT with Danish registration.

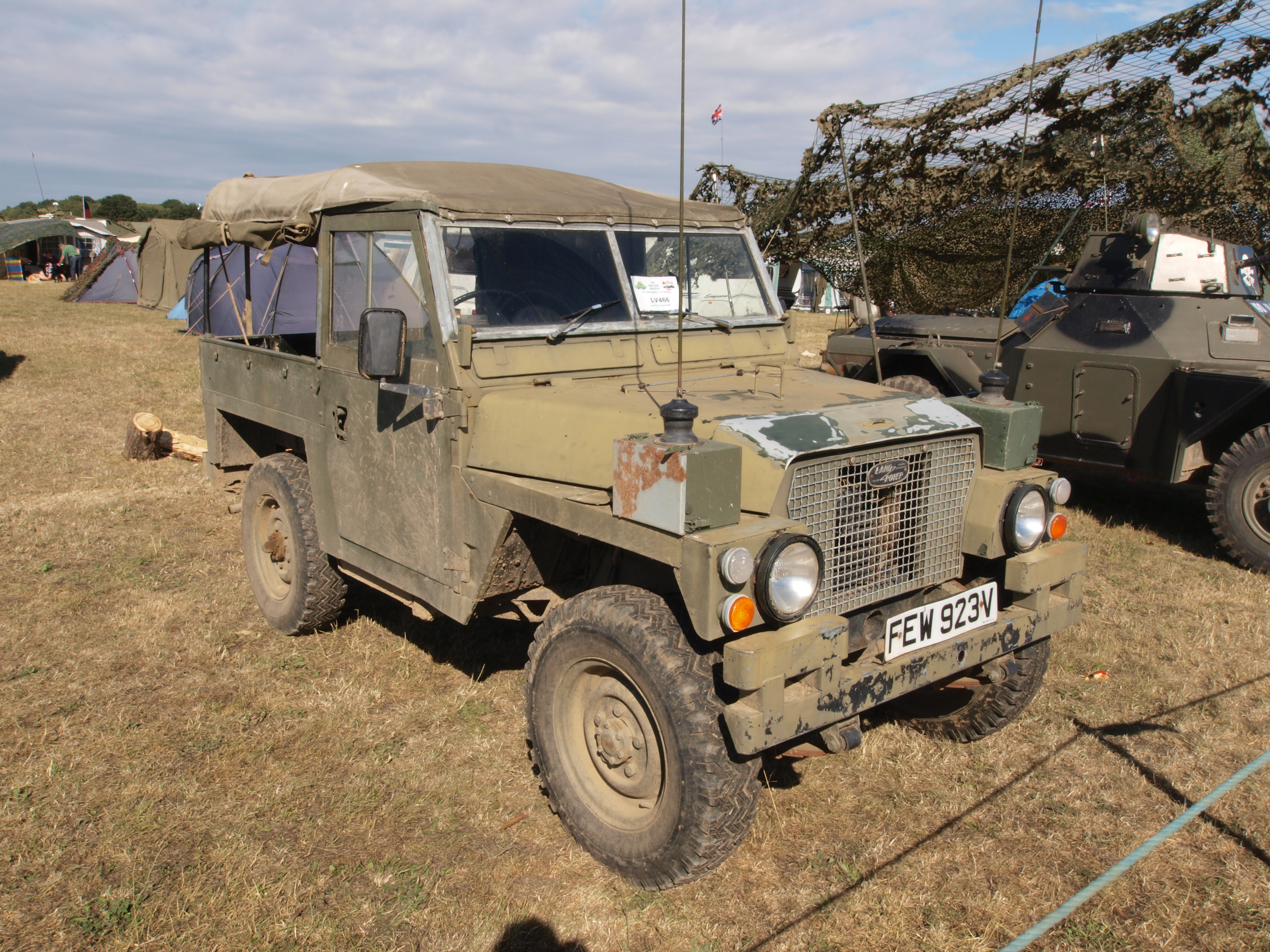
A 1979 lightweight in civilian service, 2010

Although a very few prototypes had been built between 1965 and 1967, and about six pre-production models early in 1968, 'Lightweight' Series IIA quantity production began on 11 November 1968, with a total of 15 vehicles being produced on that day. Total production of Series IIa 'Lightweights' was between 1,500 and 3,000 vehicles. Later Series IIa models had the headlamps moved out into a revised front wing, to comply with revised lighting regulations. It is easy to confuse later Series IIa models with the Series III, though nothing was changed on these vehicles other than the location of the headlamps.

The Series IIA Lightweight was replaced by the Series III Lightweight in 1972, soon after the replacement of the civilian Series IIA with the Series III. The vehicle remained in essence the same, with a few relatively minor changes - there are detail differences to the chassis; and a revised gearbox had synchromesh on second through fourth gears instead of just third and fourth. In the electrical department the Series III was fitted with an alternator in place of the dynamo of the Series IIa; the new indicator switch incorporates a headlamp flasher and horn; and the ignition switch was now fitted in a new steering column cowl instead of on the dashboard. The Lightweight did retain the earlier Series IIa metal dashboard even after the upgrade. Around 1980, in line with civilian models, the engine had five main bearings instead of three.

Lightweight production ended in 1984, when the parent Land Rover Series III was replaced by the models 90 and 110. A total of 37,897 Lightweights, petrols and diesels, were built.

== Propulsion ==
Rover 4 cylinder-in-line.

- 2,286 cc (2.25 L), 70 bhp at 4,000 rpm, 124 lbf/ft at 2,500 rpm for the petrol version
- 2,286 cc (2.25 L), 62 bhp at 4,000 rpm, 103 lbf/ft at 1,800 rpm for the diesel version

== Operators ==
- Over 20 countries besides the British Army.
- Left hand drive (LHD) models were used by the British Armed Forces in support of their NATO commitments.
- Many LHD models were used by the Dutch military and were predominantly fitted with diesel engines.

== Variants ==
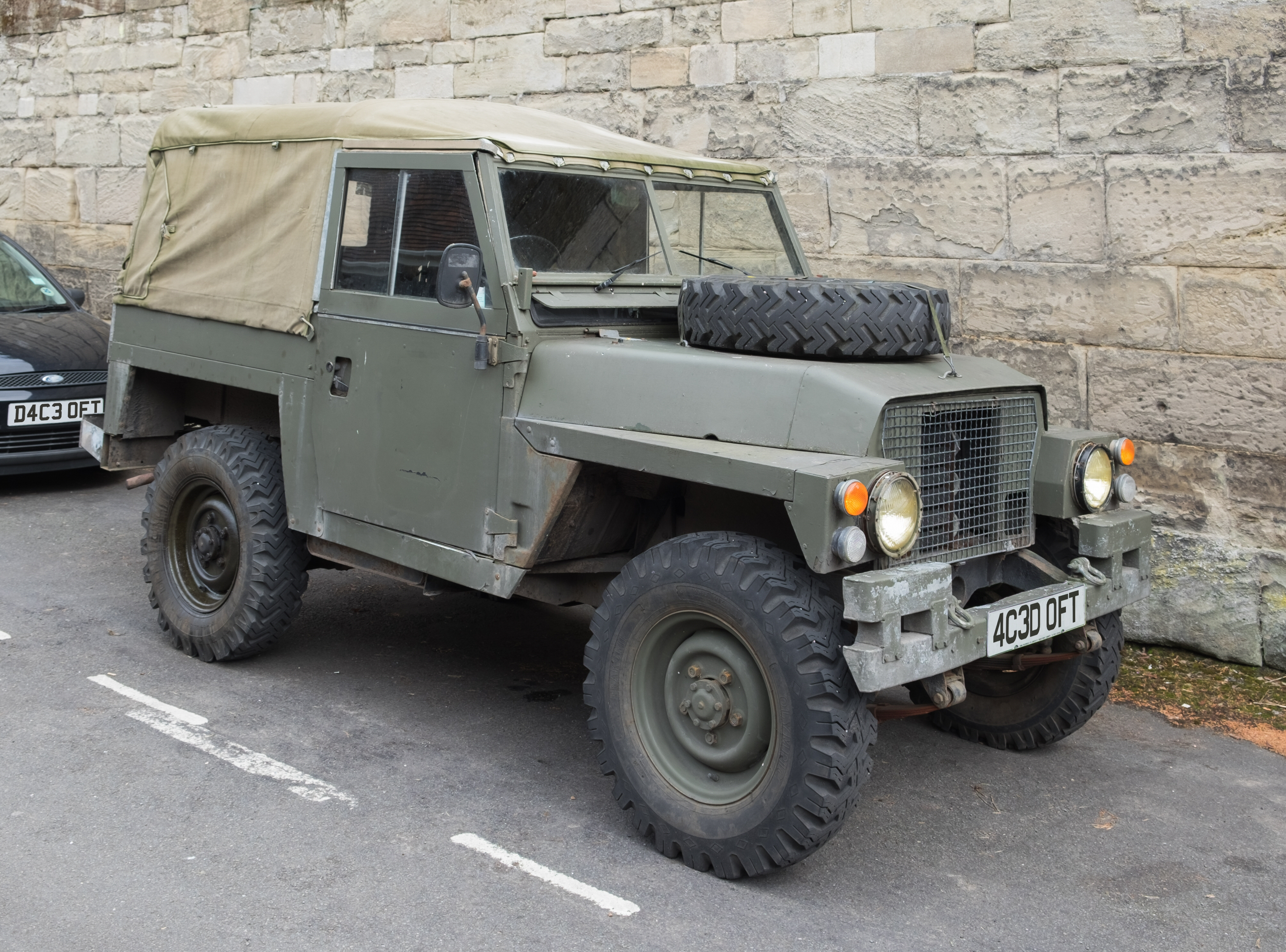
1979 Series III - front

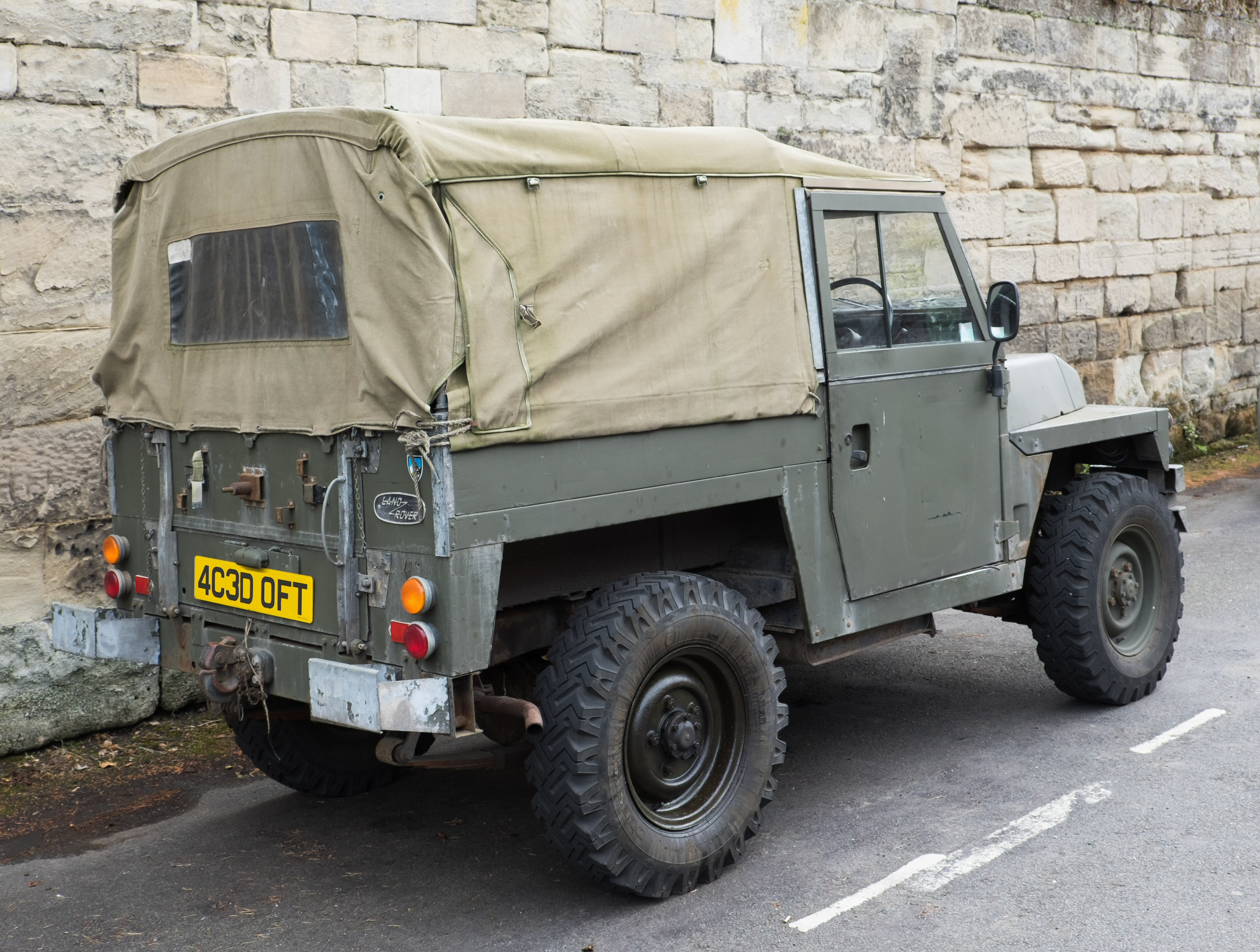
1979 Series III - rear

- Large numbers of this model were built with 24 volt electrical systems, screened ignitions systems and a 90 amp dynamo (generator) for use as FFR (Fitted For Radio) vehicles
- in Royal Marines use, a small number were equipped as portees for Wombat recoilless anti-tank weapons
- a number of these Land Rovers were retro-fitted with hard-tops and lightweight armour in the form of a VPK (Vehicle Protection Kit), mainly for internal security use in Ulster
- a number were fitted with 'Arctic' heaters for extreme cold climate use, particularly with the Royal Marines in their Arctic Warfare role
- this model could be fitted with full wading equipment to allow deep water entry from landing craft, again largely for Royal Marines use
- signal line-layers
- In RAF use as 'Helistart' versions to provide ground power for starting helicopters
- carrier for the 'Wheelbarrow' bomb detonation device. In this role most of the vehicle's body was removed
- a small number were converted to Review Vehicles

A large number of vehicles were fitted with hard tops, with or without VPKs, all apparently after production, some for use as radio vehicles

Dutch Army variants are easily identified by their diesel engines and turn signal lights positioned on the tops of the wings instead of on the front by headlights. These also had modified tail and brake lights

== See also ==
- Luchtmobiel Speciaal Voertuig (Dutch LSV, another heli-mobile vehicle)
- M1161 Growler (Vehicle designed for air transport)
- Interim Fast Attack Vehicle
- M422 Mighty Mite (A lightweight jeep for air mobility)
