= World heavyweight championship =

World heavyweight championship may refer to:

- World heavyweight boxing championship (professional)
  - World Colored Heavyweight Championship (early twentieth-century)
- World heavyweight championship (professional wrestling)
  - AAA Mega Championship
  - AWA World Heavyweight Championship
  - CMLL World Heavyweight Championship
  - ECW World Heavyweight Championship
  - GHC Heavyweight Championship
  - TNA World Championship
  - IWGP Heavyweight Championship
  - IWGP World Heavyweight Championship
  - NWA Worlds Heavyweight Championship
  - NXT Championship
  - ROH World Championship
  - Triple Crown Heavyweight Championship
  - WCW International World Heavyweight Championship
  - WCW World Heavyweight Championship
  - World championships in WWE
  - World Heavyweight Championship (WWE, 2002–2013)
  - World Heavyweight Championship (WWE, 2023–present)
  - World Zero Heavyweight Championship (Zero1)
  - World Heavyweight Wrestling Championship (original version)
  - WWE Championship
  - WWE Universal Championship
  - MLW World Heavyweight Championship
  - AEW World Championship
- Mixed martial arts:
  - Bellator Heavyweight World Championship
  - Pancrase Heavyweight Championship
  - PRIDE Heavyweight Championship
  - Shooto Heavyweight Championship
  - UFC Heavyweight Championship
- Boxing:
  - List of IBF world champions
  - List of IBO world champions
  - List of The Ring world champions
  - List of WBA world champions
  - List of WBC world champions
  - List of WBO world champions
  - List of world heavyweight boxing champions

The following world championships also have weight divisions:

- AIBA World Boxing Championships
- Karate World Championships
- Kickboxing world heavyweight championships
- World Jiu-Jitsu Championship
- World Judo Championships
- World Rowing Championships
- World Taekwondo Championships
- World Wrestling Championships (amateur)

== See also ==
- Heavy Weight Champ, a heavy-rock band from Perth, Australia
- Heavyweight Champion of the World (song) by Reverend and The Makers
