= List of equipment of the Italian Army =

Modern equipment of the Italian Army is a list of military equipment currently in service with the Italian Army.

== Weapons ==
=== Small Arms ===
Model	Image	Origin	Type	Calibre	Quantity	Notes
Combat Knife
Extrema Ratio Fulcrum		Italy	Bayonet	—	—	
Handguns
Beretta 92FS		Italy	Semi-automatic pistol	9×19mm Parabellum	24,000	Standard issue handgun to be replaced by the Beretta APX. In service since 1978: 830 delivered in 2008; 7,000 delivered in 2010
Beretta APX		Italy	Semi-automatic pistol	9×19mm Parabellum	—	New standard issue handgun. Successor of the Beretta 92FS, first entering in service with forces in active combat missions
Glock 17		Austria	Semi-automatic pistol	9×19mm Parabellum	—	Issue with special forces. In use in the Col Moschin 9º Reggimento d'Assalto Paracadutisti (9th Parachute Assault Regiment)
Glock 19X		Austria	Semi-automatic pistol	9×19mm Parabellum	—	Issue with special forces. In use in the 4° Reggimento Alpini Paracadutisti Ranger (4th Alpini Paratroopers Regiment)
FN Five-seveN		Belgium	Semi-automatic pistol	FN 5.7×28mm	—	Issue with special forces. In use in the Col Moschin 9º Reggimento d'Assalto Paracadutisti (9th Parachute Assault Regiment)
Submachine guns
Beretta PM12S		Italy	Submachine gun	9×19mm Parabellum	—	Standard issue submachine gun to be replaced by the Beretta PMX.
Beretta PMX		Italy	Submachine gun	9×19mm Parabellum	—	New standard issue submachine gun (also available to special forces). Successor of the Beretta PM12
Heckler & Koch MP5		West Germany	Submachine gun	9×19mm Parabellum	—	Issue with special forces.
FN P90		Belgium	Submachine gun	FN 5.7×28mm	—	Issue with special forces. In use in the Col Moschin 9º Reggimento d'Assalto Paracadutisti (9th Parachute Assault Regiment)
Assault rifles & Battle rifles
Beretta 70/90		Italy	Assault rifle	5.56×45mm NATO	120,000	Being replaced by Beretta NARP. Versions AR, SC, SCP: Total was 105,000 AR/SC70/90 and 15,000 SCS70/90; 500 SC70/90 delivered in 2008; 40,000 ordered in 1996 for delivery in 1999; 52,400 ordered in 1992
Beretta ARX160		Italy	Assault rifle	5.56×45mm NATO	> 25,000	Being replaced by Beretta NARP. Versions A1, A2 and A3: 92 – Soldato Futuro batch, in 2007; 800 delivered in 2008; 12,026 delivered in 2010; 600 (SF version, 9SFCM) delivered in 2010; 300 (SF version, 9SFCM) delivered in 2011; 7,301 delivered in 2011; at least 2,726 delivered in 2012
Beretta NARP		Italy	Assault rifle	5.56×45mm NATO	7,000	New standard issue assault rifle 7,000 delivered out of 50,000 ordered
Beretta ARX200 "Patrol"		Italy	Battle rifle	7.62×51mm NATO	1,170	Issue with infantry forces. Weapon with a 16-inch barrel and a GLX160 grenade launcher. Accessories: Steiner ICS (Innovative Combat Sight, automatic compensation for distance to impact)
Heckler & Koch G36		Germany	Assault rifle	5.56×45mm NATO	—	Issue with special forces. In use in the Col Moschin 9º Reggimento d'Assalto Paracadutisti (9th Parachute Assault Regiment).
Heckler & Koch HK416		Germany	Assault rifle	5.56×45mm NATO	—	Issue with special forces. In use in the Col Moschin 9º Reggimento d'Assalto Paracadutisti (9th Parachute Assault Regiment)
M4 "SOPMOD Variant"		United States	Carbine	5.56×45mm NATO	~ 2,000	Issue with special forces. Known deliveries: 2007: 1; 2008: 166; 2009: 202; 2010: 250; 2011: 202
Precision rifles
Beretta ARX200		Italy	Designated marksman rifle	7.62×51mm NATO	130	New standard issue DMR. 20 '' barrel, intelligent combat sight by Steiner Optics (integrates a laser rangefinder, an inclinometer and a ballistic calculator into a compact 6×40 optic)
M110 A1		United States	Designated marksman rifle	7.62×51mm NATO	—	Issue with special forces.
Victrix Pugio		Italy	Bolt action sniper rifle	7.62×51mm NATO	—	New standard issue sniper rifle
Sako TRG-42		Finland	Bolt action sniper rifle	8.6×70mm	—	
Victrix Scorpio		Italy	Bolt action sniper rifle	8.6×70mm	—	Issue with special forces. Selected in 2022 for some elite units (paratroopers, Alpini or the Lagunari)
Barrett M82		United States	Anti materiel sniper rifle	12.7×99mm NATO	—	Standard issue anti material rifle.
Accuracy International AWM		United Kingdom	Bolt action sniper rifle	8.6×70mm	—	Issue with special forces. Schmidt & Bender 5-25×56 optics In use in the Col Moschin 9º Reggimento d'Assalto Paracadutisti (9th Parachute Assault Regiment)
Accuracy International Arctic Warfare		United Kingdom	Bolt action sniper rifle	7.62×51mm NATO	—	
Machine guns
FN Minimi 5.56		Belgium Italy	Light machine gun	5.56×45mm NATO	3,000	Standard issue light machine gun. Licensed build by Beretta
FN Minimi 7.62		Belgium	Light machine gun	7.62×51mm NATO	130	130 planned to be purchased to FN in 2023 in 7.62 mm caliber.
MG 3 Beretta MG 42/59		Germany Italy	Machine gun	7.62×51mm NATO	30,000	Standard issue machine gun. Licensed build by Beretta, Whitehead Motofides and Franchi, since 1959
M2 Browning		Belgium United States	Heavy machine gun	12.7×99mm NATO	—	Standard issue heavy machine gun.
Shotguns
Benelli M3 Super 90		Italy	Combat shotgun	12 Gauge	—	Issue with special forces.
Benelli M4 Super 90		Italy	Combat shotgun	12 Gauge	—	Issue with special forces, slowly becoming standard issue, replacing the SPAS-15.
Beretta RS202	—	Italy	Combat shotgun	12 Gauge	—	Issue with special forces. In use in the Col Moschin 9º Reggimento d'Assalto Paracadutisti (9th Parachute Assault Regiment).
Franchi SPAS-15		Italy	Semi-automatic Combat shotgun	12 Gauge	2,000	Standard issue shotgun. Acquired in 1999.
Grenades
MF2000	—	Italy	Hand grenades	—	100,000	Standard issue grenade. New model to replace the SRCM Mod. 35 and the defective OD-82 (retired). Production of 110,000 pieces per year.
SRCM Mod. 35		Italy	Hand grenades	—	—	Standard issue grenade. 838,862 since 2012, production halted for new MF2000.
Beretta GLX-160		Italy	Attached grenade launcher	40×46 mm LV	2,726 (minimum)	Standard issue under-barrel grenade launcher: 200 delivered in 2007; 2,100 delivered in 2009; 150 delivered in 2011; at least 2,726 delivered by 2012
M203		United States	Attached grenade launcher	40×46 mm LV	—	Used with the M4 assault rifle. Issue with special forces.
Mk 19		United States	Automatic grenade launcher	40×53 mm HV	—	Standard issue automatic grenade launcher.

=== Anti-tank, anti-structure ===
Model	Image	Origin	Type	Quantity	Notes
Loitering munitions
Hero-30 (Made by Uvision and Rheinmetall Italia S.p.A.)		Israel Italy	Loitering munition		Urgent order for the special forces in December 2022.
ATGM
Spike iCLU		Israel	ATGM launcher	210	Orders: 90 in 2009: 84 for the Army; 6 for the Navy; 126 in 2020
Spike CLU		Israel	ATGM launcher	53	Orders: 53 in 2004: 32 for the infantry troops; 21 installed on the VLTM Lince
Spike MR		Israel	ATGM	165	Order: 165 in 2004
Spike LR		Israel	ATGM	1,215	Orders: 345 in 2004; 870 in 2009
Spike LR2		Israel Italy	ATGM	800	Order: 800 missiles in 2020: 600 Spike LR2 with anti-tank warhead; 200 Spike LR2 with multi-purpose warhead
TOPLITE III		Israel	Helicopter missile launcher pod	32	A pod capable to have 4 Spike-ER missiles. Order: 32 pods ordered in 2010 (option of 16), used since 2014.
Spike ER		Israel	ATGM	800	Order: 800 Spike ER ordered in 2010 for the Agusta A129D Mangusta, operational since 2010
Rocket launchers
Panzerfaust 3		Germany	Anti-tank rocket launcher	2,000	2,000 launchers with 17,000 rockets, delivered since middle '90s; 7,100 Panzerfaust 3-T (PZF3-T) rockets, delivered in 2007; 1,100 Panzerfaust 3-T (PZF3-T) rockets, delivered in 2008; 2,616 Panzerfaust 3-T rockets (PZF3-T), delivered in 2009; 832 Bunkerfaust rockets, delivered in 2011; 1,066 Panzerfaust 3-T (PZF3-T) rockets, delivered in 2011
Instalaza C90		Spain	Anti-tank rocket launcher		In use with the special forces, 90mm rocket lancher, variants: CR anti-armor; AM anti-personnel; BK anti-bunker

== Light equipment ==
=== Weapon accessories and optical systems ===
Model	Image	Origin	Type	Quantity	Notes
Weapon sights
ICWS "Individual Combat Weapon System"		—	Multi-role sight system	20,000	Multifunction unit with modules that can be changed: Day sight; IR sight; Red dot; Visible laser; IR visible laser; Ordered in 2020.
Aimpoint CompM2 "Acies"		Sweden	Non-magnifying red dot / reflex sight	20,000	Supplied between 2004 and 2006.
ELCAN Specter DR 1-4×		Canada	Magnifying red dot / reflex sight	—	
ELCAN Specter DR 1.5-6×	—	Canada	Magnifying red dot / reflex sight	—	Used with the FN Minimi, imported by Selenia 2000.
AN/PAS-13B(V3)		United States	Thermal weapon sight	—	Used with heavy weapons. Deliveries: 36 in 2008, used with the Minimi 7.62 mm; 299 in 2009; 174 in 2011
Steiner ICS "Innovative Combat Sight"		Germany	Rifle scope	—	Automatic compensation for distance to impact, 6×40 magnification.
SIMRAD KN250F	—	United States	Night sighting system	—	For use with Panzerfaust-3 and others squad weapons; 100 delivered in 2009
Night vision goggles
AN/PVS-21		United States	Night-vision goggles	2,860	Made by Steiner Defence: 489 ordered in 2003; $8.9 million order, in 2004, for approximately 500 systems; $15.3 million contract for delivery, in 2006/2007, 900 systems; $16.0 million order in 2008 (for estimated 950 systems); 23 delivered in 2012 (403,522 Euros)
AN/PVS-18 M983		United States	Night-vision goggles (monocular)	—	Delivered by FM CASE.
AN/PVS-15 M983		United States	Night-vision goggles	—	Delivered by FM CASE
AN/PVS-7B/D		United States	Night-vision goggles	—	
TM-NVG "Tactical Mobility-Night Vision Goggle"		United States	Night-vision goggles	3,284	Manufactured by i-Aware: 558 delivered in 2013/2014; 2,726 ordered in 2014; 1,537 planned into the same contract
Insight Tecnologyes MUM-2	—	United States	Monocular Night Vision Device	—	Deliveries: 21 in 2009; 54 in 2011; 1,010 in 2012
Thermal imaging
Sagem MATIS	—	France	Thermal imaging system	—	About 1,200 systems delivered The HH variant is for medium range, and MP is for long range.
Thales Sophie MP		France	Thermal imaging system	—	Long range imaging system. Deliveries: 2 in 2007; 73 in 2008; 5 in 2009; 35 in 2011; 31 in 2012
Elbit Coral CR		Israel	Thermal imaging system	—	Deliveries: 5 in 2008; 5 in 2009; 30 in 2011.
Raytheon W1000-15	—	United States	Thermal imaging system	—	Used with support weapons.

=== Clothing ===
Model	Image	Origin	Pattern type	Environment / colours	Notes
Clothing
Base clothing equipment in M04 Mimetico vegetata camouflage		Italy	Mixed leaf / Flecktarn pattern	Temperate / central Europe	Standard clothing.
Camouflage
M04 Mimetico vegetata		Italy	Mixed leaf / Flecktarn pattern	Temperate / central Europe	Standard camo in use in the Italian Army since 2004. It is made for temperate climates, typically western / north-west Europe. This camouflage is being used on clothing, backpacks, helmets, vests, gloves and other accessories. 4 colours: light khaki base, light olive green, reddish brown, dark brown.
M04 Mimetico vegetata deserto		Italy	Mixed leaf / Flecktarn pattern	Arid / desert	Desert camo in use by the Italian Army for battle dress uniforms in desert and semi-arid regions.It was mostly deployed in Afghanistan. 4 colours: sandy beige base, light tan, ochre and chocolate brown.
Aghi di pino (Pine-needle)		Germany	Brushstroke	Winter / snow camo	Alpini's standard winter camouflage, originating from Germany, used by the Alpini, the mountain troops of the Italian Army. This camouflage is being replaced. Colours: unified white background with few dark green brushstroke spots.
—		—	Flecktarn pattern	Winter / snow camo	Alpini's new standard winter camouflage, replacing the old equipment with the former standard camouflage. Colours: unified white background with Flecktarn light grey spots.
—		—	Ghillie suit	Winter / snow camo	Sniper winter camouflage suit, used by the Alpini.
—		—	Ghillie suit	Temperate / central Europe	Sniper camouflage suit, used by the Alpini.

=== Protective equipment ===
Model	Image	Origin	Type	Quantity	Notes
Combat helmets
SEPT 2 Plus		Italy	Helmet	38,000	Deliveries: 4,000 in 2007; 6,000 in 2008; 12,170 in 2009 (new model); 6,600 in 2010 (new model); 10,370 in 2011
LBA Aramid helmet	—	United Kingdom	Helmet	136	136 delivered in 2012, with IIIA-Mach II protection
Bulletproof vests
NC4/09		Italy	Bulletproof vest	21,000	Deliveries: 5,131 in 2009; 8,288 in 2011; 6,785 in 2012; 2,726 in 2013
AP98/A	—	Italy	Bulletproof vest	87,000	Deliveries: 4,000 in 2007; 43,500 in 2008; 10,000 in 2009; 30,000 in 2010
Pezt Protech 5200	—	Italy	Bulletproof vest	150	Deliveries: 30 in 2008; 120 in 2009
LBA	—	United Kingdom	Bulletproof vest	50	All delivered in 2009.
NFM Delta Body Armour	—	United States	Bulletproof vest	51	All delivered in 2008.
Bomb suits
EOD-9 Bomb suite		Canada	Protective bomb suite	94	Deliveries: 16 in 2007; 10 in 2008 (MED-ENG); 10 in 2009 (Allen-Vanguard Technologies Inc); 38 in 2012 (Allen-Vanguard Technologies Inc); 8 in 2013 (MED-ENG); 3 in 2015 (MED-ENG); 6 in 2016 (MED-ENG)
Sona Enterprise RAV 501	—	United States	Protective bomb suite	60	60 delivered in 2011
NBRC protection
Aero Sekur M90		Italy	NBCR mask	63,000	Contract for 63,000 masks signed in October 2003, delivery in summer 2004 (€5.5 million).
NBCR individual vest		Italy	NBCR suit	41,730	Deliveries: 14,000 in 2008; 21,000 in 2009; 4,004 in 2012; 2,726 in 2012-2014, for Sistema Individuale di Combattimento
Electronic detection systems
Canberra AN/PDR-77	—	United States	Radiation detection system	1,300	1,300 system updated in 2012.
CEIA CMD		Italy	Metal detector	427	Bought to protect soldiers from IED in Afghanistan during patrols. Deliveries: 30 in 2008; 30 in 2010; 30 in 2011; 52 in 2012, CMD V2.0; Orders: 120 CMD V2.0 in 2013; 60 PD-240 in 2014; 33 CMD C-IED in 2017

=== Parachutes ===
Model	Image	Origin	Type	Quantity	Notes
T10C		United States Italy	Non steerable parachute	—	Contract signed in August 2003 for 1,895 parachutes (type MIRPS, MC1-1C and T10-C), for ~ €4 million. Licence made by Aero Sekur.
MC1-1B/C		United States Italy	Steerable parachute	—	Licence made by Aero Sekur.
T10R MIRSP	—	United States Italy	Reserve parachute	—	Licence made by Aero Sekur.
Para-Flite MT-1XX	—	United States	Parachute	—	HAHO/HALO-TCL parachute
Raven G-12	—	United States	Cargo parachute	430	1.0 t (2,200 lb) capacity.
26 foot	—	United States	Cargo parachute	70	1.0 t (2,200 lb) capacity.

== Indirect fire ==
=== Mortars ===
Model	Image	Origin	Type	Calibre	Quantity	Notes
Infantry mortars
Hirtenberger M6C-210		Austria	Infantry Mortar	60 mm	320	Delivered between 2002 and 2003, for 5.4 million Euros
Expal MX2 KM		Spain	Mortar	81 mm	271	In 2010 for 22.3 million Euros to replace oldest 253 Mod. 62 81 mm mortar: 28 delivered in 2011; 98 ballistic computers delivery in 2012
Heavy mortars
MO-120 RT		France	Towed mortar	120 mm	< 139	139 delivered between 2000 and 2004. Some were donated to Ukraine from 2022.
Mortar carriers
VBM Freccia with 2R2M mortar		Italy	Mortar carrier	120 mm	35	Purchases: 21 VBM Porta Mortaio ordered in 2007, delivered by 2017.; 14 VBM Porta Mortaio ordered with the Armament programme 2022:
M106		United States Italy	Mortar carrier	120 mm	Unknown	Mortar carrier being phased out. 420 made under license by OTO Melara, different variants: M-125, with the Mod. 62 81 mm mortar; M-106 mortar weapon carrier with Mod. 63 120 mm mortar; In 1994, 200 M-106 carrier were in service.

=== Artillery ===
Model	Image	Origin	Type	Calibre	Quantity	Notes
Towed howitzers
OTO Melara Mod 56		Italy	Pack howitzer	105 mm L/14	18+	330 in service since 1960s; withdrawn in early 2000s and limited number returned to service in 2013: Some were donated to Ukraine.
FH70		Italy Germany United Kingdom	Towed howitzer	155 mm L/39	90	164 in service since 1982, some being updated with new engine and fire control computer (LINAPS) starting in 2020. 12 to 18 per regiment. Some were donated to Ukraine.
Self-propelled howitzers
Panzerhaubitze 2000		Germany Italy	Self-propelled howitzer	155 mm L/52	64	70 PzH 2000 purchased, of which 68 were license built by OTO Melara. 6 donated to Ukraine in 2022. 18 PzH 2000 per regiment with four regiments, the rest with the artillery school.
Rocket artillery
M270A1 MLRS-I		United States	Multiple rocket launcher	—	21	22 M270A1 received in 1988. 21 of which upgraded to M270A1 MLRS-I by 2012. All 21 being upgraded to M270A2.
Specialised ammunition
Vulcano BER	—	Italy	Base-bleed shells with programmable fuse	155 mm	1,686	Ordered in 2023 Variants possible include: BER: Unguided; GLR: Guided GPS; GLR / SAL: Laser terminal guidance; Total of 2,700 planned.
Vulcano GLR	—	Italy	Guided shells with programmable fuse	155 mm	1,686	Ordered in 2023 Variants possible include: BER: Unguided; GLR: Guided GPS; GLR / SAL: Laser terminal guidance; Total of 2,700 planned.

== Armoured vehicles ==
=== Armoured fighting vehicles ===
Model	Image	Origin	Type	Quantity	Notes
Main battle tanks
Ariete C1		Italy	Main battle tank	110	200 Ariete received in total. Among the 200, 90 are being modernised to the C2 standard, and there is an option for 35 additional to modernise by 2035.
Ariete C2		Italy	Main battle tank	3 (+ 87 on order)	90 are being modernised to the C2 standard, and there is an option for 35 additional to modernise by 2035.
Fire support vehicles
Centauro		Italy	Tank destroyer	259	In service with the army's nine cavalry regiments. Initially, 400 purchased, 141 sold to Jordan. The vehicles are being replaced by the Centauro 2 vehicles.
Centauro 2		Italy	Tank destroyer	150	Production started in 2021. Orders: 10 in July 2018; 86 in December 2020 (+ 10 in option); 26 in June 2022 (among which the option for 10 contracted); 28 in June 2024; Total of 150 planned. First operational squadrons in 2024.
Infantry fighting vehicles
Lynx KF41		GermanyItaly	Infantry fighting vehicle	5	Total Lynx planned: 1050 developed with indigenous variations such as the HITFIST 30 tower: 679 KF41 Infantry Fighting Vehicle, (IFV); (~) KF41 Counter-tank (ATGW); (~) KF41 Command post (C2); (~) KF41 Mortar carrier (SPA); (~) KF41 Reconnaissance; 2026 - Initial deliveries of at least 51 (IFV) 2027 2028 - deliveries of prototypes of the 16 variants 2029 2030 - start of series vehicle production
VCC Dardo		Italy	Infantry fighting vehicle	198	150 To be upgraded.
VBM Freccia	VBM da Combattimento (AIFV) VBM Controcarro (ATGW) VBM Posto Comando	Italy	Infantry fighting vehicle	630	Total Freccia planned: 630 First phase of 249 delivered by 2017: 172 VBM da Combattimento (AIFV); 36 VBM Controcarro (ATGW); 20 VBM Posto Comando; 20 VBM Posto Comando(see indirect fire section); Second phase that was approved in 2019 Contracts: 2020: Italian Army to receive 30 VBM (5 Combat, 25 Antitank); 2022: Italian Army to receive 46 VBM (26 command post, 14 mortar(see indirect fire section), 6 armored recovery); 2024: Italian Army to receive 76 VBM PLUS (60 Combat, 16 Antitank)

=== Armoured vehicles (APC, reconnaissance) ===
Model	Image	Origin	Type	Quantity	Notes
Wheeled vehicles
VTLM 1 Lince	VLTM 1 Ambulance (MEDEVAC) VLTM 1 with Hitrole RCWS VLTM 2 NEC	Italy	Infantry mobility vehicle	1,900	3,623 planned in total: 30 VTLM + 30 VTLM not armored, for 16.8 million Euros, ordered in 2003; 1,153 VTLM, for 335 million Euros, ordered in 2004, for deliver in July 2011 (81 with Hitrole Light); in 2007 ordered update of 32 VTLM, to transform in Spike missile launcher, for 3.9 million Euros; 35 VTLM tactical ambulance, ordered in 2006/2007, for 19.9 million Euros; 5 VTLM delivered in 2009; 103 VTLM delivered in 2010; 10 VTLM tactical ambulance, delivered in 2010; 1 prototype VTLM-1A delivered in 2010; 139 VTLM-1A delivered in 2011 (on 364 total planned for 2011/2012); 5 VTLM-1A delivered in 2012; 25 VTLM-1A tactical ambulance, delivered in 2012; 479 VTLM-1A planned between 2012 and 2014, for 202 million Euros (60 with Hitrole Light); 30 VTLM 2 ordered in 2020; 671 VTLM 2 ordered in 2022
Puma		Italy	APC	200 (6x6)	Purchased 180 4×4s and 360 6×6s, gradually retired
Orso 4×4	Command post variant Command post variant interior	Italy	MRAP	56	Variants in service: 40 Iveco VTMM Orso 4×4 RCP (Route Clearance Package), with 25 options, ordered in 2011 for delivery since 2013 (120 million Euros); 16 Iveco VTMM Orso 4×4 Ambulance ordered in 2009, delivered in 2014; Total of 633 Orso planned to be acquired.
Cougar HE		United States	MRAP	12	Since 2008, in Afghanistan theatre.
GMV Flyer 72		United States	Light Strike Vehicle	27	In use in the Col Moschin 9º Reggimento d'Assalto Paracadutisti (9th Parachute Assault Regiment).+ 52 to be ordered.
Tracked vehicles
Bandvagn 206		Sweden	Tracked articulated vehicles (APC)	300	Variants in service: 110 BV206 (unprotected); 112 BV-206S7 (armoured) acquired between 2002 and 2008; 46 BV-206D (specialised version) acquired between 2002 and 2008 (command post, SAR, TOW, ambulance, fuel transport)
AAV7-A1		United States	Amphibious assault vehicle	17	Variants in use: 15 AAVP-7 (APC); 1 AAVC-7 (Command vehicle); 1 AAVR-7 (ARV); To be replaced by: 64 Iveco SuperAV for the Army; 18 Iveco SuperAV for the Army Engineering Corp

=== Armoured engineering vehicles ===
Model	Image	Origin	Type	Quantity	Notes
Combat engineering vehicles
Pionierpanzer 2 Based on Leopard 1 tank chassis		Germany Italy	Armoured engineer vehicle	40	28 made under licence by OTO Melara, in service since 1985.
Bergepanzer 2 Based on Leopard 1 tank chassis		Germany Italy	Armoured recovery vehicle	136	67 made under licence by OTO Melara, in service since 1971.
Biber Based on Leopard 1 tank chassis		Germany Italy	Armoured vehicle-launched bridge	59	64 delivered; all made under licence by OTO Melara, in service since the 1980s.
CBRN defence
VBR NBC		France Italy	CBRN reconnaissance	15	9 updated by Aris SPA with Italian components and designated VBR NBC Plus.
Demining and EOD vehicles
VTMM Orso ACRT-RC	Orso and route clearance tool Orso route clearance inside	Germany Italy	MRAP / EOD	40	40 Iveco VTMM Orso 4×4 RCP (Route Clearance Package), purchased with an option for 25. The contract was worth €120 million. It was ordered in 2011, with deliveries starting in 2013. It is equipped with the SPARK roller.
Buffalo MPV		United States	MRAP / EOD	7	Purchased initially to dispose of IED in Afghanistan and Iraq: 7 Mk2A1 purchased in 2 batches (4 + 3); 9 Mk2A2 ordered in April 2022.
MiniFLAIL		United States	Robotic mine proofing system	—	3 ordered in 2009, 6 ordered in 2012.
Equipment for EOD vehicles
Telerob TEODOR		Germany	Unmanned demining vehicle	—	2 ordered in 2013, 14 ordered in 2014 (and 1 more for Brigata Marina San Marco). It will replaced the Mk-8 Wheelbarrow systems.
iRobot PackBot 510		United States	Unmanned demining vehicle	—	Equipped for EOD and IEDD. 3 delivered in 2010, 12 in 2011, 12 in 2012.
Wheelbarrow Mk8 Plus II		United States	Unmanned demining vehicle	—	

== Unarmoured vehicles ==
=== Base vehicles ===
Model	Image	Origin	Type	Quantity	Notes
Unarmoured combat vehicles
VM90 / Armored VM90		Italy	Infantry mobility vehicle	2,000	Detailed deliveries: 84 VM90T3 in 2006; 96 VM90T3 in 2007; 18 VM90T3 in 2008; 3 VM90 Ambulance in 2008; 113 VM90T3 in 2009; 30 VM90T3 in 2010; 30 VM90T3 in 2011; 12 VM90 Ambulance in 2011; Orders: 121 VM90T3 in 2012; 241 VM90T3 in 2013; 2 VM90T3 fire-fighting version in 2013; 341 VM90T3 planned in 2014
Jeep Wrangler J8 Nuova Autovettura da Ricognizione (new reconnaissance vehicle)		United States	Light reconnaissance vehicle	210 (+ 210 option)	Purchased as a replacement of the AR90 Land Rover Defender 90 for light reconnaissance in 2020 (delivery 2021-22). To be used by the special forces. 200 light (in light grey livery) + 10 standard (military livery) purchased. At a longer term 2,400 are expected in total, the variants being: Light: a civilian variant; Standard: Light Patrol Vehicle; Command; Troop (tarpaulin); Utility; Armoured; ambulance
Special forces vehicles
Land Rover VAV90 / Defender 90 WMIK		United Kingdom	Off-road vehicle	50	Weapons Mounted Installation Kit, version with 12.7mm machine gun or 40 mm grenade launcher, for special forces.
Aris LTATV		Italy	Off-road buggy	—	110 to be ordered.
Utility vehicles
Autobus Fiat A90.14/Fiat 370		Italy	Bus	—	—
Tekne Horton		Italy	Bus	98	35 passengers possible, ordered in 2021
Light vehicles
Cagiva Enduro T4 350cc		Italy	Motorcycle	—	—
MLA 90 – Pozza Alpenparà		Italy	Motorcycle	—	Parachute motorcycle
Polaris Sportsman 700MUV 4×4	—	United States	All-terrain vehicle	—	With parachute units
Polaris Sportsman Big Boss 6×6		United States	All-terrain vehicle	—	Since 2014 with 185th Artillery Parachute Regiment for mortars & ammunition transport
MTA 90 – Pozza	—	Italy	Tricycle light transport vehicle	—	Parachuted
MTC 90 – Fresia F18 4×4		Italy	Light transport vehicle	700	36 MTC-80 (Fresia F10) delivered since 1988, followed by MTC-90 model

=== Engineering equipment ===
Model	Image	Origin	Type	Quantity	Notes
Bridging equipment
PFM "Pont Flottant Motorisé"		France	Bridging system	90	PGM, Ponte Galleggiante Medio
Bailey bridge	Illustration bridge type	United Kingdom	Bridging system	—	
MGB Medium Girder Bridge		United Kingdom	Bridging system	—	8 delivered in end '80s
Mobile cranes
Isoli Defence M120		Italy	Mobile crane	—	Isoli crane on Iveco 260.35 6×6, in service since 1981; being phased out
Isoli Defence M180 crane		Italy	Mobile crane	—	Isoli crane on Iveco 260.35 6×6, in service since 1981; being phased out
Isoli Defence M200		Italy	Mobile crane	—	TCM C 200M crane on Iveco SMH 88.42 8×8, to replace M180 cranes. Deliveries: 6 in 2007; 8 in 2008; 8 in 2009
Isoli Defence M300		Italy	Mobile crane	—	TCM C 300M crane on Iveco SMH 88.45 BAT 8×8. Deliveries: 8 in 2007; 26 in 2009; 6 in 2012
Isoli Defence M400	—	Italy	Mobile crane	—	TCM C 400M crane on Iveco SMH 88.45 BAT 8×8. Deliveries: 5 in 2009; 5 in 2011
ORMIG 603TTV 6×6	—	Italy	Mobile crane	20	—
Locatelli Grill 850		Italy	Mobile crane	5	—
Tadano Faun ATF60-3 Crane		Germany	Mobile crane	15	
Logistics handling equipment
Merlo P36.7 Plus	(Illustration)	Italy	Telescopic handler	—	—
Merlo P72.10	—	Italy	Telescopic handler	—	—
Manitou MRT 1850 Privilege	(Illustration)	France	Telescopic handler	9	Delivered in 2010.
JCB 930	(Illustration)	United Kingdom	Rough terrain forklift	84	60 delivered between 2008 and 2010; 24 ordered in 2010.
Fantuzzi LiftMast	(Illustration)	Italy	Reach stacker	—	
Loaders
FAI Panda 380	—	Italy	Skid-steer loader	—	—
FIAT New Holland W130B		Italy	Wheel loader	—	In service since 2010. 22 delivered by 2011.
FIAT New Holland W190B	—	Italy	Wheel loader	—	In service since 2010. 51 delivered by 2011.
FIAT Komatsu WB97S5	—	Italy	Wheel loader	—	51 delivered between 2010 and 2012 (of which 42 in 2011).
JCB 1CX	—	United Kingdom	Wheel loader	100	
JCB 3CX	—	United Kingdom	Wheel loader	—	—
JCB 426		United Kingdom	Wheel loader	—	—
Backhoe loaders
Komatsu WB97S		Japan	Backhoe loader	—	Supplied in collaboration with Sertech Srl.
VF Venieri VF10.33 Avio	—	Italy	Backhoe loader	—	
Excavators
Komatsu PC210NLC-8		South Korea	Crawler excavator	—	
FIAT New Holland E245B	—	Italy	Crawler excavator	24	Delivered in 2009.
FIAT Hitachi FE 20	—	Italy	Crawler excavator	—	—
FIAT Hitachi EX235	—	Italy	Crawler excavator	—	—
FIAT Komatsu PC210NLC	—	Italy	Crawler excavator	46	Delivered in July 2011.
Colmar T3500	—	Italy	Wheel-railway excavator	—	1 in service since the 1990s.
Colmar T7000	—	Italy	Wheel-railway excavator	—	1 in service since the 1990s with the railway regiment.
Bulldozers
FIAT Hitachi FD 175	—	Italy	Crawler dozer	—	—
FIAT New Holland D180	—	Italy	Crawler dozer	—	51 on delivery between 2010 and 2012.
FIAT Hitachi FL 175	—	Italy	Crawler loader	—	—
Caterpillar D7R	—	United States	Crawler dozer	—	3 delivered in 2009.
Road construction equipment
FIAT Allis FL150C	—	Italy	Grader	—	—
FIAT New Holland F156.6	—	Italy	Grader	—	20 delivered between 2010 and 2012
Bitelli Condor S	—	Italy	Roadroller	—	22 delivered in 2011
Concrete equipment
ATCL 6×6 Autobetonpompa	—	Italy	Comcrete mixer truck with pump	—	23 delivered between 2009 and 2012. CIFA pump system installed on the Iveco SM 66.45 6×6 truck.
Carmix 4×4	(Illustration)	Italy	Self-loading drive concrete mixer	—	30 ordered in 2013, to Metalgalante Spa
Energy stations
Parizzi GE/9-765-1	(Illustration)	Italy	Energy station trailer	—	10/12 kW energy station trailer.
Parizzi GE/9-765-2	(Illustration)	Italy	Energy station trailer	—	25 kW energy station trailer.
Parizzi GE/9-765-3	(Illustration)	Italy	Energy station trailer	—	50 kW energy station trailer.
Miscellaneous
Unimog 416	—	Germany	Wheel-railway tractor	—	2 in service with the railway regiment since the 1990s.
ATCL 6×6 Piattaforma Lavoro Sollevabile	—	Italy	Aerial work platform on truck	16	16 delivered between 2009 and 2012. Based on the Iveco SM 66.45 6×6 truck.
Volvo FL90	—	Sweden	Recovery truck	—	

=== Logistics ===
Model	Image	Origin	Type	Quantity	Notes
Trucks
Iveco ACM 80/90 4×4		Italy	Tactical-logistic vehicle	3000 +	—
Iveco ACL 90 4×4		Italy	Tactical-logistic vehicle	3800	Being phased out
Iveco ACTL 4×4		Italy	Tactical-logistic vehicle	—	The type entered service in 1999. Some of the variants in service: SMR 44.31 ACTL 4×4; SMR 44.31 4×4 Cella Telescopica; SMR 44.31 4×4 flatbed; SMR 44.31 4×4 tanker; SMR 44.31 4×4 con piattaforma di lavoro sollevabile; SMR 44.31 4×4 dumper; Some of the deliveries: 28 ACTL in 2007; 38 ACTL in 2008; 17 SMR 44.31 BAD 4×4 in 2008; 17 ACTL in 2009; 12 ACTL in 2011.
Iveco ACTL 6×6		Italy	Tactical-logistic vehicle	—	Variants in service: SMR 66.40 6×6 SACIM fuel-tank; SMR 66.40 6×6 autoribaltabile; SMH 66.40 6×6 BAD – tank –; SMH 66.40 6×6 multiuser; SMH 66.45 6×6 AMT (Dumper); SMH 66.45 6×6 T-ZAT with Zorzi/SACIM/Zenith 26,000 lt fuel-tank semi-trailer (since 2004); Deliveries: 8 SMH 66.45 6×6 CMT (crane and flatbed), in 2009; 10 SMH 66.45 6×6 AMT (Dumper), in 2010; 14 SMH 66.45 6×6 AMT (Dumper), in 2011; 20 SMH 66.45 6×6 AMT (Dumper), in 2012; 17 SMH 66.45 6×6 BMT (flatbed), in 2012; 11 SMR 66.40 6×6 tactical tank (8,000 lt), in 2007; 10 SMR 66.40 6×6 tactical tank (8,000 lt), in 2008; 5 SMR 66.40 6×6 tactical tank (8,000 lt), in 2012
Iveco ACP90	—	Italy	Tactical-logistic vehicle	About 100	In service since 1989. 40 delivered in 2009. The ACP90 6×6 is used for engineering missions and for the transport of M270 MLRS ammunitions.
Iveco ATM90 traino artiglierie		Italy	Tactical-logistic vehicle	136	SMR 66.40 CAD 6×6
Iveco ACTL 8×8		Italy	Tactical-logistic vehicle	—	All versions are designed to be airmobile.: APS-95, SMR 88.45 8×8 with Multilift MkIV system (in service since 1999); Deliveries: 10 APS-95, SMR 88.45 8×8 delivered in 2007; 10 APS-95, SMR 88.45 8×8 delivered in 2008; 10 SMR 88.45 8×8 BAD for SAMP/T batteries, delivered in 2009; 10 SMR 88.45 8×8 BAD for SAMP/T batteries, delivered in 2010; 60 SM88.42 IM 8×8 (fitted with Isoli Hiab Multilift hookloader) delivery between 2010 and 2013; 19 ACTL 8×8 delivered in 2011; 12 ACTL 8×8 delivered in 2012
Iveco ACTL 6×6		Italy	Tactical-logistic vehicle	—	—
Iveco ATC 81/A		Italy	Tactical-logistic vehicle	94	Iveco 320 PTM45 6×6 with Bartoletti TCS 50 BO, in service since 1981.
Iveco ACTL 8×8 portacarri		Italy	Tactical-logistic vehicle	71	Tank transport truck, the SM 88.50 TIM 8×8 with the trailer LOHR SMC 64-6.3.: 6 delivered in 2004; 8 delivered in 2005
Iveco HD6		Italy	Tactical-logistic vehicle	—	870 in service since 1996: HD6 66.45 6×6 porta-container; HD6 66.45 6×6 TIM trattore; HD6 66.45 6×6 crane; HD8 66.52 II serie 6×6; 90 additional HD6 66.45 6×6 double-cab semi-trailer truck are used for the PGM bridge section (delivered since 1996).
Volvo FM	—	Sweden	Semi-truck	4	4 with Zorzi semi-trailers delivered in June 2012.
Mod. 85 Cucina rotabile	—	Italy	Kitchen trailer (200 rations)	—	Deliveries: 15 in 2008; 3 in 2009; 200 in 2010; 121 in 2011; 105 since 2014 (Osim Plocco)
Airport logistic trucks
Tekne Shelter Carrier Truck		Italy	Tactical Container Truck	—	Manufactured by Tekne and Astra, derived from the Astra HD9 8×8 "Pipe Carrier". Low cab, able to enter a C-130. And its main interest is that it can get a container in an aircraft like the C-130 without needing a machine. Its hook makes it easy. This is a very convenient logistics truck. Some are equipped with a crane.
Aris TPA90	—	Italy	Tactical-logistic vehicle	—	
Trailers
Adamoli RB1AA	—	Italy	1-axle trailer	—	
Adamoli RB1AB		Italy	1-axle trailer	—	
Adamoli RB2ADR	—	Italy	2-axles trailer	—	—
Adamoli RB2ADR	—	Italy	2-axles trailes	—	—
Adamoli R3A30	—	Italy	3-axles trailer	—	
Zorzi	—	Italy	3-axles semi-trailer	—	4 Zorzi delivered in June 2012
–		Italy	Equipment transport semi-trailer	—	—
–		Italy	Heavy equipment transport trailer	—	—
Containerised systems
Sanijet921 NBCR system		Italy	Container	—	ISO1C 20′ Cristanini Containerised Sanijet921 system for NBCR deep decontamination station. Deliveries: 3 in 2008; 4 in 2009; 3 in 2010
NBCR system		Italy	Container	—	ISO1C 20′ Cristanini Containerised system for NBCR decontamination. Deliveries: 2 in 2008; 10 in 2009; 11 in 2010; 15 in 2011
NBCR laboratory		Italy	Container	—	ISO1C 20′ Containerised Crsitanini NBCR laboratory / Aris Spa LAB NBC 3 delivered in 2008 (1N + 2C).
Weapon storage shelter		Italy	Container	—	Aris Spa ASTM (Ammunition Storage Module) ISO1C 20′ Containerized weapon storage system: 5 delivered in 2012
NBCR COLPRO		Italy	Container	—	ISO1C 20′ Containerised Cristanini COLPRO system. Deliveries: 1 in 2008; 1 in 2012
Tank-tainer		Italy	Container	—	Deliveries: 3 in 2008 ISO1C 20′ Containerised "Tank-tainer" system 10,000 l; 10 in 2010 ISO1C 20′ Containerised "Tank-tainer" system 15,000 l; 9 in 2011 ISO1C 20′ Containerised "Tank-tainer" system 15,000 l
Energy station 500 kVA	—	Italy	Container	—	ISO1C 20′ Containerised 500 kVA energy supply station. Deliveries: 5 in 2011; 1 in 2008 (570 kVA)
Energy station 375 kVA	—	Italy	Container	—	ISO1C 20′ Containerised 375 kVA / 300 kW energy supply station. Deliveries: 15 in 2007; 5 in 2013 from L.E.M. (mod. SME/400)
Energy station 150 kVA	—	Italy	Container	—	ISO1C 20′ Containerised 150 kVA energy supply station. 3 delivered in 2008.
Aris TORO 120 kW	—	Italy	Shelterised energy station	—	120 kW energy station, initially delivered for Hawk batteries; pallet transportable or by trailer.
Refrigerated system		Italy	Container	—	ISO1C 20′ Containerised two cells, refrigerated system. Deliveries: 4 in 2008; 16 in 2010; 16 in 2011; 4 in 2013
Water purifying system	—	Italy	Container	—	ISO1C 20′ ITECO water purifying Containerised system. Deliveries: 3 in 2008; 6 in 2010; 2 in 2012
Kitchen system for 200 rations per hour		Italy	Trailer	—	Supplied by Carra S.R.L.
Kitchen system for 500 rations per hour		Italy	Container	—	Containerised kitchen system for 500 rations, based on 2 ISO1C 20′ containers. Deliveries: 6 in 2011; 1 in 2007 (improved to 600 rations)
Bakery		Italy	Container	—	Containerised bakery, based on 2 ISO1C 20′ containers. 1 delivered in 2011.
Laundry system		Italy	Container	—	ISO1C 20′ Containerised laundry. Deliveries: 8 in 2010; 8 in 2011
Showers system		Italy	Container	—	ISO1C 20′ Containerised showers. Deliveries: 12 in 2008; 1 in 2011; 20 in 2013
Toilet system		Italy	Container	—	ISO1C 20′ Containerised toilet. Deliveries: 13 in 2008; 18 in 2010; 18 in 2011; 5 in 2013
Tents
Modular pneumatic tents		Italy	Military tent	—	—
Heating and cooling systems for tents		Italy	Temperature conditioning systems	—	

== Emergency equipment ==
Model	Image	Origin	Type	Quantity	Notes
Firefighting trucks
Fresia F60C 4×4 Teseo	—	Italy	Airport firefighting trucks	—	
SIRMAC Rampini SAB2500D Vulcano	—	Italy	Airport firefighting trucks	—	
Field hospitals
ROLE 2		Italy	Military field hospital	—	Basic version (7 modules): emergency and acceptance; diagnostics; hospitalization; surgery; intensive care; supply of drugs and medical materials; management; Enhanced version (on top of 7 modules of the Basic version): analysis laboratory; pharmacy; hospitalisation; basic medicine/care; isolation; dentistry; mental health management; can accept additional modules
Nucleo chirurgico campale		Italy	Military field hospital - surgical module	—	Module of the ROLE 2 medical complex. Module inside pneumatic tents.: surgical module (with the equipment necessary for an operating room); service module (generator, heating or air conditioning, medical gas)

== Electronics and communications ==
=== Communications ===
Model	Image	Origin	Type	Quantity	Notes
Satellite terminals
Selex TSM 305 S - Iveco VM90		Italy	Ground station for Satellite communications system	—	
Selex TSM 231C		Italy	Ground station for Satellite communications system	—	Medium/High capacity, satellite terminal
SatCom antenna		United States	SatCom antenna	—	Antenna for L3 Harris AN/PRC-117 tactical software-defined combat-net radio.
Radio links
Selex PR6 190/N		Italy	Radio bridge station	—	Shelterised radio bridge with 2 pairs of radio links: MH297/X; MH344
Radio
L3 Harris AN/PRC-152		United States	Man-portable, tactical software-defined combat-net radio	—	
L3 Harris AN/PRC-117		United States	Man-portable, tactical software-defined combat-net radio	—	Multi-band networking manpack radio
ITT Inc. HCDR Centaur		United States	High capacity data radio - UHF	—	
Selex SDR Hand-Held		United Kingdom	Man-portable, tactical software-defined	—	VHF radio: 2,726 ordered in 2014
Selex PRR H4855		United Kingdom	Hand held radio	—	Selex ES VHF man portable SDR. Deliveries: 4,000 in 2007; 2,650 in 2010; 4,795 in 2011; 50 in 2012
Selex CNR 2000 – SRT 178		Italy	Radio	—	HF radio station, Combat Net Radio (CNR): low, medium and high capacity versions. 50 delivered in 2007 (low power).
Selex SRT 633P SINCGARS		Italy	Radio	—	VHF vehicle radio in service on-board: C1 Ariete; Dardo IFV; Centauro 8×8; VBM Freccia 8×8
Elmer RH5/478VT – SRT 478	—	Italy	HF/BLU Mobile Radio Station	—	In service since the 1980s.
Elmer SRT 178 – RH4/178		Italy	HF/BLU Mobile Radio Station	—	In service since the 1980s.
Thales AN/PRC-148		France	Hand held-radio	—	Deliveries: 117 in 2008; 43 in 2009; 65in 2011 (version JEM)
Thales TRC-3770	—	France	Hand held-radio	—	51 delivered in 2009.
Video receiver
ROVER		United States	Video receiver	—	System that receives images from drone or reconnaissance pod on jet fighters. Deliveries: 73 in 2010 (IV and V version).
Command systems
SIACCON ADV "Italian Automated Information System for Command and Control"		Italy	—	—	Command and Control structure based on the Network Centric Warfare (NCW) principle.
LC2 EVO "Land Command and Control Evolution"		Italy	Support system to command and control system	—	Collaboration tool, centralising multiple sources of data.
SICCONA "Command, Control and Navigation System"		Italy	Navigation system for command and control	—	
C2N/BFSA "Blue Force Situation Awareness"		Italy	Command and control system	—	Installed on tactical-logistic platforms, features: localization and geo-referenced representation of the forces situation; indication of the route to follow; message communications; access to communications; management of transmission
Blue Force Tracking		Italy	Data tracking for command and control system	—	System tracking localisation, communications, in support of command and control.

=== Other major electronic system ===
Model	Image	Origin	Type	Quantity	Notes
Electronic warfare
SIAR	—	Italy	ELINT system	7	5 fixed installations and 2 mobile ones (every system is composed by 3 mobile sensors shelterized and one VM90P supervisor) based on Elettronica ELT/888(V)3 ELINT systems. Delivered since end '90s (ER90 system, based on initially Elettronica ELT/888 system) has been updated more times.
Thales Smart Rhino	—	France	Jammer	—	HF Jamming station.
Laser designators
Elbit PLDRII		Israel	Laser designator	—	
Elop PLDR	—	Israel	Laser designator	—	Deliveries: 2 in 2007; 5 in 2008; 4 in 2009; 1 in 2011
Elbit RATTLER	—	Israel	Laser designator (short range)	—	2 delivered in 2012 (one G and one H version).
Miscellaneous
Metravib Pilar MkIIW system		France	Gunshot detector	—	6 in delivery since 2013
ICARO Stazione radiosondaggio	—	Italy	Meteo probe system	—	1 system in service in 2003. 22 systems delivered by 2009.

== Boats ==
Model	Image	Origin	Type	Quantity	Notes
SAI Ambrosini 121 Trushter	—	Italy	Motorboat	60	Used by 2° Bridging Regiment.
Motorboat	—	Italy	Motorboat	—	EIG-48, EIG-49, EIG-134, EIG-135, EIG-136, EIG-208, EIG-209, EIG-210 operated by the Lagunari Regiment. The Hydroambulance "Caria" is used by the 9° Col Moschin Regiment.
MTP	—	Italy	Landing craft	—	Used by Lagunari Regiment.
Assault boat	—	Italy	Boat	—	Used by Lagunari Regiment.
Zodiac Hurricane		France	RHIB	—	Used by 9° Col Moschin Regiment.
Zodiac FC470		France	RHIB	—	4 version 7 delivery in 2012
Hart	—		Canoe	—	

== Air-defence ==
=== Air defence systems ===
Model	Image	Origin	Type	Quantity	Notes
Medium-to-long range air defence system
SAMP/T		France; Italy	Surface-to-air missile system	5/6 SAMP/T; 1/10 SAMP/T-NG	6 SAMP/T fires units ordered, assigned to 4 active batteries, 1 training battery, and 1 spare battery donated to Ukraine; 4th Anti-aircraft Artillery Regiment "Peschiera" 10 new SAMP/T-NG fire units ordered in 2025 for the Italian Army First SAMP/T-NG fire unit delivered on 22 January 2026.
Short range air defence system
Skyguard Aspide		Italy	Surface-to-air missile system	0	6 fire units acquired in 1992. Last units were retired in 2025 and replaced by GRIFO fire units 17th Anti-aircraft Artillery Regiment "Sforzesca"; 121st Anti-aircraft Artillery Regiment "Ravenna"
GRIFO		UK; Italy	Surface-to-air missile system	2/6	6 GRIFO fire units ordered in 2022 (together with similar MAADS fire units for the Italian Air Force. The Italian Army's fire units are equipped with the Rheinmetall Air Defence Italy radar X-TAR3D. Budget €456.3 million for 6 fire units with munitions. Option for 3 additional fire units and additional missiles for €106.3 million. First GRIFO fire unit delivered on 22 January 2026.
Very short range air defence system
FIM-92 Stinger		United States	MANPAD	145	In service since 1987. 145 launchers and about 675 missiles have been delivered. 17th Anti-aircraft Artillery Regiment "Sforzesca"; 121st Anti-aircraft Artillery Regiment "Ravenna"
Skynex		Italy Switzerland	C-RAM	1 (+ 3 on order)	4 Skynex (static configuration) ordered in January 2025 to Rheinmetall Italia. First system delivered in December 2025. Each system is made of: 4 Revolver Gun Mk3 (35mm with AHEAD ammunition); CN-1 command module; X-TAR3D X-radar

=== Radars ===
Model	Image	Origin	Type	Quantity	Notes
Air-defence radar and systems
RAT-30C Radar	—	Italy	2D air-defence radar	1	In service since '90s, for low level air space control
RAT-31SC Radar	—	Italy	3D air-defence radar	1	—
LPD/20-J Contraves Radar	—	Italy	Air surveillance radar	—	In service since 1985. Introduced for duty with 40/70 AA batteries, now is in service as surveillance radar for SIDAM & STINGER batteries.
FDOC Digit	—	Italy	C2 Air defence system	—	Original FDOC was deployed with PIP-HAWK. 4 systems were upgraded to be digitalised for the Skyguard-Aspide batteries.
Battlefield surveillance radars
RSCB Ranger Selex ES Radar Radar Sorveglianza Campo Battaglia		Italy	Man-portable radar	—	In service with 41° Cordenons Regiment since 2006.
Lyra-10 Selex ES Radar	—	Italy	Man-portable radar	6	In service since 2013, for FOB protection.
Thales Squire		Netherlands	Man-portable radar	—	In service with 41° Cordenons Regiment.
Artillery locating systems
Arthur Radar		Sweden Italy	Artillery locating radar	5	Systems ordered to Selex ES in 2009 (€83 million), delivered from 2013.
Selex ES HALO (Hostile Artillery Locating System)	—	United Kingdom	Artillery locating system	Unknown quantity	The delivery started in 2012. 5 were ordered in 2014.

== Aircraft inventory ==
=== Fixed-wing aircraft ===
Model	Image	Origin	Type	Quantity	Notes
Transport
P-180		Italy	Transport	3	
Dornier 228		Germany	STOL transport aircraft	3	

=== Rotary-wing aircraft ===
Model	Image	Origin	Role	Quantity	Notes
Attack helicopters
A129 Mangusta		Italy	Attack helicopter	37	Variants in service: 32 A129D; 5 A129C; The Army already retired 11 A129C.
Leonardo AW249		Italy	Attack helicopter	4 prototypes	17 AW249 are on order. A total of 48 AW249 are planned.
Heavy transport helicopters
CH-47C Chinook		United States	Transport	5	40 in service since 1973, 5 remain in service.
CH-47F Chinook		United StatesItaly	Transport	15	16 ordered in 2009, jointly developed between Boeing and AgustaWestland, and built by AgustaWestland under licence in Italy. 1 was lost in 2026.
Transport and utility helicopters
NH90 TTH		France Germany Italy Netherlands	Utility / transport	59	Among the 60 helicopters received, 1 was lost in 2008.
AB-206		United States Canada Italy	Utility	29	Made under licence by Agusta. Will be replaced by the UH-169D.
AB-205		United States Italy	Utility	37	Made under licence by Agusta. Being replaced by the UH-169D.
UH-169D		Italy	Utility	15	30 UH-169D ordered, Planned total is 50.
Training helicopter
AW169B		Italy	Trainer	2	

=== Unmanned aerial vehicles ===
Model	Image	Origin	Type	Role	Quantity	Notes
RQ-7B Shadow (Made by AAI Corporation)		United States	Fixed-wing UAV Unmanned aerial vehicle	ISR Intelligence, surveillance, and reconnaissance	16	Ordered in 2010, received in 2016.
APR Rapier X-25 (Made by Sky Eye Systems)	—	Italy	Fixed-wing mini UAV Unmanned aerial vehicle	ISR Intelligence, surveillance, and reconnaissance	6	Ordered in December 2022. 2 systems with 3 aircraft each.
RQ-11 Raven (Made by AeroVironment)		United States	Fixed-wing mini UAV Unmanned aerial vehicle	ISR Intelligence, surveillance, and reconnaissance	36 (variant A) 36 (variant B)	Received in 2007-08.
Bramor C4EYE (Made by C-Astral)		Slovenia	Fixed-wing mini UAV Unmanned aerial vehicle	ISR Intelligence, surveillance, and reconnaissance	3	Purchased in 2014.
CREX-B (Made by Leonardo)		Italy	Fixed-wing mini UAV Unmanned aerial vehicle	ISR Intelligence, surveillance, and reconnaissance	—	Received in 2014.
SIXTON (Made by Alpi Aviation and A3R)		Italy	Fixed-wing mini UAV Unmanned aerial vehicle	ISR Intelligence, surveillance, and reconnaissance	2	Received in 2010.
STRIX (Made by Alpi Aviation)		Italy	Fixed-wing mini UAV Unmanned aerial vehicle	ISR Intelligence, surveillance, and reconnaissance	3 (variant c) 1 (variant D)	Received in 2010.
SPYBALL-B (Made by Leonardo)		Italy	Rotary wing, mini UAV Unmanned aerial vehicle	ISR Intelligence, surveillance, and reconnaissance	—	Received in 2014.
ASIO-B (Made by Leonardo)		Italy	Rotary wing, mini UAV Unmanned aerial vehicle	ISR Intelligence, surveillance, and reconnaissance	—	Received in 2014, designed for "hover and stare".
IA-3 COLIBRÌ (Made by IDS-Ingegneria Dei Sistemi)		Italy	Quadcopter, mini UAV Unmanned aerial vehicle	ISR Intelligence, surveillance, and reconnaissance	—	Carbon fibre structure.
Aeronautics Skystar 300 (Made by Controp)	—	Israel	Surveillance balloon	ISR Intelligence, surveillance, and reconnaissance	1	Received in 2013.

== Future equipment ==
=== Equipment ordered ===
Model	Image	Origin	Type	Quantity	Notes
Artillery
M142 HIMARS		United States	Multiple rocket launcher	21	Purchase approved in October 2023 for the 2024 budget: €145 million for the launchers; €960 million for the munition, training, maintenance; Firm orders: 7 ordered in February 2024; 14 ordered in January 2025
Utility vehicles
INEOS Grenadier	(illustration)	Austria France United Kingdom	Utility offroad vehicle	–	To enter service in 2027.
Logistics
IDV SMR6 4×4 Standard Military Range	—	Italy	Military tactical trucks	319	Orders: December 2024: 1,483 new trucks. Contract value: €755 million, delivery: 2025 - 2038: 319 SMR6 4×4; 1,038 SMR6 8×8; 31 SMR6 8×8 HD; 67 SMR6 10×10; December 2025: 658 additional trucks, delivered by 2039
IDV SMR6 8×8 Standard Military Range	—	Italy	Military tactical trucks	1,038	Orders: December 2024: 1,483 new trucks. Contract value: €755 million, delivery: 2025 - 2038: 319 SMR6 4×4; 1,038 SMR6 8×8; 31 SMR6 8×8 HD; 67 SMR6 10×10; December 2025: 658 additional trucks, delivered by 2039
IDV SMR6 8×8 - heavy duty Standard Military Range	—	Italy	Military tactical trucks	31	Orders: December 2024: 1,483 new trucks. Contract value: €755 million, delivery: 2025 - 2038: 319 SMR6 4×4; 1,038 SMR6 8×8; 31 SMR6 8×8 HD; 67 SMR6 10×10; December 2025: 658 additional trucks, delivered by 2039
IDV SMR6 10×10 Recovery Standard Military Range	—	Italy	Recovery trucks	67	Orders: December 2024: 1,483 new trucks. Contract value: €755 million, delivery: 2025 - 2038: 319 SMR6 4×4; 1,038 SMR6 8×8; 31 SMR6 8×8 HD; 67 SMR6 10×10; December 2025: 658 additional trucks, delivered by 2039
Air defence
Leonardo Kronos Grand Mobile High Power SAMP/T NG Middle life upgrade		Italy	Air defence guidance radar	6	New radar for the SAMP/T batteries of the Army to be supplied by Leonardo (former Finmeccanica-Selex ES).
Aster 30 Block 1 NT SAMP/T added capabilities and additional stockpile		Italy France	Missile	< 700	Contract for a bit less than 700 new missiles in 2023 (Aster 15 and 30 for France, only Aster 30 for Italy) to be supplied to: French Navy; French Air Force; Italian Navy; Italian Army; Italian Air Force

=== Planned orders ===
Model	Image	Origin	Type	Quantity	Notes
Artillery
RCH-155		Germany Switzerland Italy	Self-propelled howitzer	70	As part of the modernisation of the artillery, the army is looking for a wheeled howitzer to complement its PzH 2000 and replace the FH70. In October 2024, the RCH 155 was selected by the government. A budget request was made to the parliament for a value of €202 million to order a first batch of RCH 155 and set up the logistics, maintenance, training programme, resupply vehicles and recovery vehicles. A requested budget of €1.608 billion for a second batch was also requested to the parliament. The base vehicle is unknown, but could include: Boxer; Piranha 10×10; Freccia (who was used as the base vehicle for the Porcospino, an OTO Melara self-propelled howitzer); A truck
Main battle tanks
Panther KF51		Germany Italy	Main battle tank	132	Italy has ordered 132 Panther KF51 main battle tanks, as well as 140 KF51 chassis based armored support vehicles. No firm order yet.
Armoured fighting vehicles
A2CS Programme (Army Armored Combat System) based on Lynx KF41		Germany Italy	Infantry Fighting Vehicle, Command post, Counter-tank, Mortar carrier, Reconnaissance, Mobile SHORAD, Engineering, Ambulance, Ammunition carrier, Driving training	1050 (679 IFV)	Initially named AICS (Armoured Infantry Combat System), the programme intended to purchase up to 570 tracked vehicles. The programme was renamed A2CS in January 2024 with the intent to purchase 1,050 vehicles in a first phase for a budget of €5.2 billion over 14 years, and a lifetime cost estimated at €15 billion. The intention is to replace the Dardo with a new tracked IFV, to use this platform for other roles. In terms of technical capabilities, the Italian Army is interested in a vehicle with modular armour, open architecture, command and control capability and drone management (air and ground drones). Italy intends to collaborate with other European countries on that programme. Leonardo and Rheinmetall signed a joint venture (JV) to design and to build 1,050 vehicles in 4 variants (for 16 configurations) based on Lynx KF41. Leonardo-Rheinmetall JV was awarded a contract to supply 21 Lynx KF-41 IFV in November 2025, first delivery order of A2CS programme. The first vehicles were officially introduced in Italian service on 27 January 2026.
Freccia		Italy	Reconnaissance	120	
Armoured vehicles (APC / reconnaissance)
Bronco ATTC		Singapore Italy	Multirole tracked articulated vehicles	160	Programme to manufacture 160 F/ATV (full all-terrain vehicles) to replace the Bv206 and the Bv206s7. The competitors are: Leonardo with ST Engineering; IDV with BAE Systems AB; Variants: 8 PC (command post); 79 TT (troop transport); 11 TF (wounded transport); 18 PM (mortar carrier); 33 TM (equipment transport); 6 SO (rescue / workshop); 6 CIST (citerns); Cost estimate, €570 million.
BvS10 Mk2		Sweden Italy	Multirole tracked articulated vehicles	160	Programme to manufacture 160 F/ATV (full all-terrain vehicles) to replace the Bv206 and the Bv206s7. The competitors are: Leonardo with ST Engineering; IDV with BAE Systems AB; Variants: 8 PC (command post); 79 TT (troop transport); 11 TF (wounded transport); 18 PM (mortar carrier); 33 TM (equipment transport); 6 SO (rescue / workshop); 6 CIST (citerns); Cost estimate, €570 million.
SuperAV		Italy	Variants not defined yet	82	Successor of the AAV-7: 64 for the Army; 18 for the Army engineers; (64 for the Italian Navy's San Marco Marine Brigade)
VTMM 2 Orso 6×6 Veicoli Tattici Medi Multiruolo		Italy	Armoured command Post	197	The Command Post versions are aimed at enhancing the Command and Control (C2) capability of Army units at the Land Tactical Command Posts of the Brigades, regiments/Task Forces and battalions, allowing Commanders and their staff to exercise the C2 function even on the move.
VTMM 2 Orso Veicoli Tattici Medi Multiruolo		Italy	Armoured vehicle in specialised variants	150	As part of the variants, one expected is an armoured logistic vehicle, ambulances, EOD.
VTMM 2 Orso Veicoli Tattici Medi Multiruolo		Italy	Other roles	190	633 VTMM planned in total: 247 VTMM 2 mentioned above; 96 in service; 190 additional to reach 633
GMV Flyer 72		United States	Light Strike Vehicle	269	Already in use in the Col Moschin 9º Reggimento d'Assalto Paracadutisti (9th Parachute Assault Regiment). Additional planned in the Documento di Programmazione Pluriennale (DPP) 2023-2025 for the special forces and the Paratroopers Brigade "Folgore".
Armoured engineering vehicles
KF51 AEV		Germany Italy	Armoured engineering vehicles	0/140	Based on the KF-51 Panther (Rheinmetall/Leonardo); Replacement for all Leopard 1-based vehicles; Approved by the government, to be supplied from 2027 to 2037
KF51 ARV		Germany Italy	Armoured recovery vehicles	0/140	Based on the KF-51 Panther (Rheinmetall/Leonardo); Replacement for all Leopard 1-based vehicles; Approved by the government, to be supplied from 2027 to 2037
KF51 AVLB		Germany Italy	Armoured vehicle-launched bridge	0/140	Based on the KF-51 Panther (Rheinmetall/Leonardo); Replacement for all Leopard 1-based vehicles; Approved by the government, to be supplied from 2027 to 2037
Utility vehicles
IDV MUV 70.20 Military Utility Vehicle		Italy	Multi-role 4×4	3,750	A 4×4 military variant of the Iveco Daily to replace the VM90
Air defence
MBDA Fulgur	—	Italy	MANPAD	—	MBDA announced the development of a new MANPAD missile following the expression of a new missile needed by the Italian Armed Forces.

Equipment in development financed by the government, but no order yet, or competition launched
Included in the parliament budget, and budget predictions, but no contract has been signed yet
Potential equipment considered in a middle-term future

== See also ==
- Italian Armed Forces
