= ACTL =

ACTL may refer to:

- The American College of Trial Lawyers, a professional association of trial lawyers from the US and Canada
- The Azienda comunale dei trasporti della Città di Lugano, a former transport operator in Lugano, Switzerland
- Actel Corporation, a semiconductor manufacturer based in California, US (former NASDAQ code ACTL)
- The Iveco ACTL, a military transport vehicle produced by Iveco for the Italian Army
- Air Tanzania Company Limited (ACTL), the national airline of Tanzania
