= Harris v Evans =

Harris v Evans was a 1998 appeal civil court case in the United Kingdom between John Terence George Harris, a bungee jump operator, and Glynne Evans, an inspector of the Health and Safety Executive (HSE), and the Health and Safety Executive itself. The appeal was against a prior case in which the respondent, Harris, argued that the appellants made "negligently excessive requirements" of their business. The case was presided over by the Vice Chancellor Sir Richard Scott, Lord Justice Auld and Lord Justice Schiemann and involved the Health and Safety at Work etc. Act 1974.

Evans had given advice to local authorities on the safety requirements of a mobile crane and other equipment used by Harris in connection with their bungee jump business which led to the local authorities either banning Harris from offering bungee jump services or serving prohibition notices under the 1974 Act. When the Secretary of State revealed that Evans' advice had not been in keeping with HSE policy, the ban was lifted and the notices withdrawn. The issue was whether Evans, as an HSE officer, in advising local authorities on the safety of equipment used for a bungee jumping business, had a duty of care to Harris to avoid causing economic loss.

The court decided that Evans was not liable for Harris' economic loss because he had operated under a statutory duty and his duty of care was to members of the public and not the operators.
