= Merlo (company) =

Italian manufacturer of telescopic handlers

- Company type: Family business
- Industry: Special vehicles, Agriculture, Construction, Material Handling, Forestry
- Founded: 1911
- Founder: Giuseppe Amilcare Merlo
- Headquarters: Cuneo, Italy
- Area served: Worldwide
- Key people: Paolo Merlo, Andrea Merlo, Silvia Merlo
- Number of employees: 1,600
- Parent: Merlo Group
- Website: www.merlo.com

Merlo S.p.A. is an Italian manufacturer of telescopic handlers based in San Defendente, Cervasca, Cuneo, Piedmont, with a 330,000-square-metre (3,600,000 sq ft) factory. It has over 600 dealers world-wide.

In 2015, 87% of Merlo's sales were for export markets, claiming to be market leader in Italy, Germany, Sweden, Norway, Russia, Austria, New Zealand and Quebec province of Canada). In 2021, Merlo produced 7200 machines.

== History ==
Merlo was founded in 1911 in close to the city centre of Cuneo by Giuseppe Amilcare Merlo. In the beginning, the company worked in a small workshop & blacksmith, famous for their ability to repair almost anything. In 1948, the Merlo family children got involved with the company's management.

In 1964, Amilcare Merlo & his sister Natalina formed Merlo Group and inaugurated a new production facility. The first product from the newly formed Merlo Group was the DM Dumper in 1964. In 1966, the company built their first DBM self-propelled concrete mixerconcrete mixers featuring a fully hydrostatic drive train. In 1972, the factory was severely damaged after heavy snowfall caused the plant's roofs to cave in.

In 1970 came the first Merlo off-road forklift truck.

In 1981, Merlo produced their first telescopic handler, the SM 30, which combined the 'performance of a forklift and that of a hydraulic telescopic boom crane'. Featuring 4 wheel drive, 4-wheel steering and 4 equal wheels the SM30 was much more advanced than the offerings from the competition which tended to utilise a rear wheel steer and unequal wheel configuration.

In 1987, the company released the Panoramic XS telescopic handler with a side engine and a low-hinged boom at the rear of the chassis. A true 360-degree field-of-vision was available to the operator.

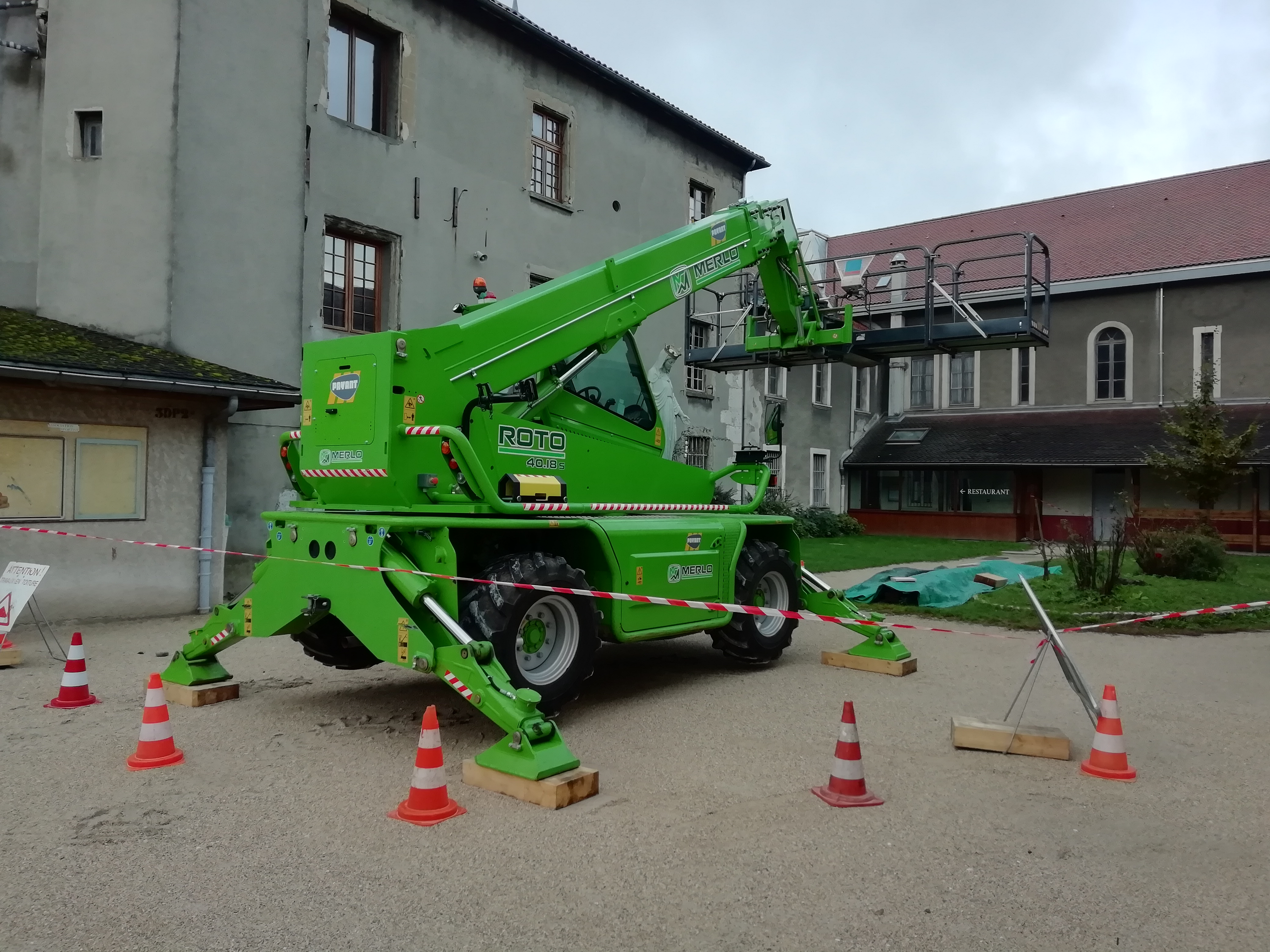
Merlo Roto 40.18

In 1991, the rotating handler the ROTO was launched. With the ability to deploy stabiliser legs, these high reach machines could lift, extend and rotate like a crane.

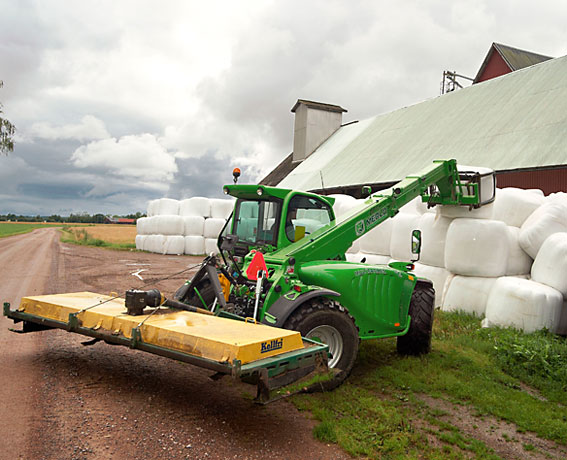
Merlo Multifarmer

The year 2000 saw the introduction of the Merlo Multifarmer, combining a telescopic handler design with that of a tractor, fitted with a rear 3-point linkage, PTO, drawbar/trailer hitch and additional hydraulic services.

At the agricultural exhibition Agritechnica in 2013, Merlo displayed a Hybrid powered handler. Ahead of its time, it caught the eye of the DLG judges who awarded it a gold medal for its innovation and design.

During late 2021, Merlo previewed its all-new Merlo eWorker, a fully electric, compact telescopic handler. Featuring a 2.5-ton lift capacity and 5 meters of reach, this emissions-free electric-powered model was the first step in Merlo Group's Generation Zero programme of emission free vehicles.

== Subdivisions ==
As of 2010 Merlo group consisted of:

- Merlo, manufactures telehandlers
- Tecno, manufactures urban solid-waste collection systems
- Tre-emme, manufactures telehandler attachments
- Project, Merlo's R&D division
- CFRM, training and research centre for mobile crane operation and safety training
- Rental
- Cingo, manufactures Multifunction Tracked Carriers

86% of revenue originated from telehandlers.

== Past models ==
Dumpers:
DM
DBM

lift trucks
CEM
P23.6
P26.6
P28
P30
P32
P34
ROTO

== Founders ==
The growth of Merlo is mainly credited to the founder's son Amilcare and his sister Natalina. Amilcare Merlo was born on November 24, 1934 in Cuneo. At age 14, he started working in his father's blacksmith.

In 2008, he was convicted to a one-year pardoned prison sentence for being responsible for a deadly accident. A worker had died while using a Merlo vehicle, which the court ruled, didn't meet safety requirements.

In 2002, he was awarded the French Order of Agricultural Merit. He also holds the Italian Order of Merit for Labour and the French Legion of Honour. In 2015, Amilcare and Natalina were awarded honorary citizenship of Cuneo. In 2020, he received an honorary master's degree from the Polytechnic University of Turin.

In November 2022, Amilcare Merlo died. His sister Natalina had died the previous year.
