= GFF4 =

Armored personnel carrier

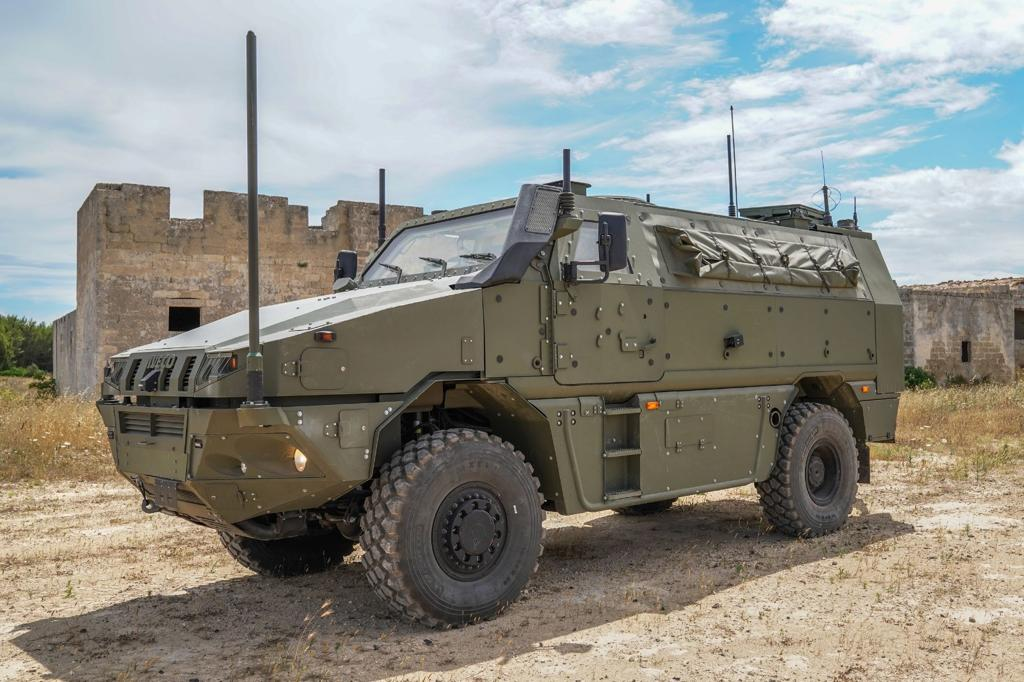
- VTMM Orso Command Post
- Type: APC
- Place of origin: Germany/Italy

Service history
- In service: Current

Production history
- Designed: June 2007
- Manufacturer: Krauss-Maffei Wegmann Iveco
- Produced: 3rd quarter 2007- present
- Variants: Possible 4x4 and 8x8 variants

Specifications
- Mass: 25 t (24.6 long tons; 27.6 short tons)
- Length: 7.60m
- Width: 2.53m
- Height: 3.08m
- Crew: 1 driver +10 passenger
- Armor: Monocoque hull with AMAP
- Engine: Diesel Iveco; 331 kW (444 hp)
- Suspension: 6x6
- Operational range: 700 km (435 mi)
- Maximum speed: 90 km/h (56 mph)

The GFF4 (Geschützte Führungs- und Funktionsfahrzeuge, Klasse 4: Protected Command and Functional Vehicles, Class 4), previously KMW Grizzly, is a medium weight MRAP armored personnel carrier, developed by Krauss-Maffei Wegmann (KMW), designed for operation with the German Army based on the 6x6 Trakker chassis from Iveco adapted to meet the needs of the German Army. It is being developed under the direction of the German Ministry of Defence Federal Office of Defense Technology and Procurement (Bundesamt für Wehrtechnik und Beschaffung). The GFF4 is designed to meet the German Army's "Class 4" protected command and role-specific vehicles, with a gross vehicle weight of 25 tons, and transportable on the Airbus A400M aircraft. Currently, the German Army could use only the smaller 12.5 ton ATF Dingo 2 or the 33 ton Boxer MRAV.

Grizzly can carry 10 fully equipped troops, which exceeds by greater than 50% the 3 tons required by the German request for proposal (RFP). The vehicle is protected in all directions. The driver's station and crew compartment form an integral safety cell providing protection against improvised explosive devices (IEDs), projectiles, missiles and mines. The cell's frame also forms a rollcage. The engine compartment and transmission are armored to reduce the chance of a 'mobility kill' under attack.

KMW is offering the vehicle in several configurations, and since the design is based on a modular concept, a smaller 4x4 or larger 8x8 variant, with corresponding payloads are possible.

== Operators ==
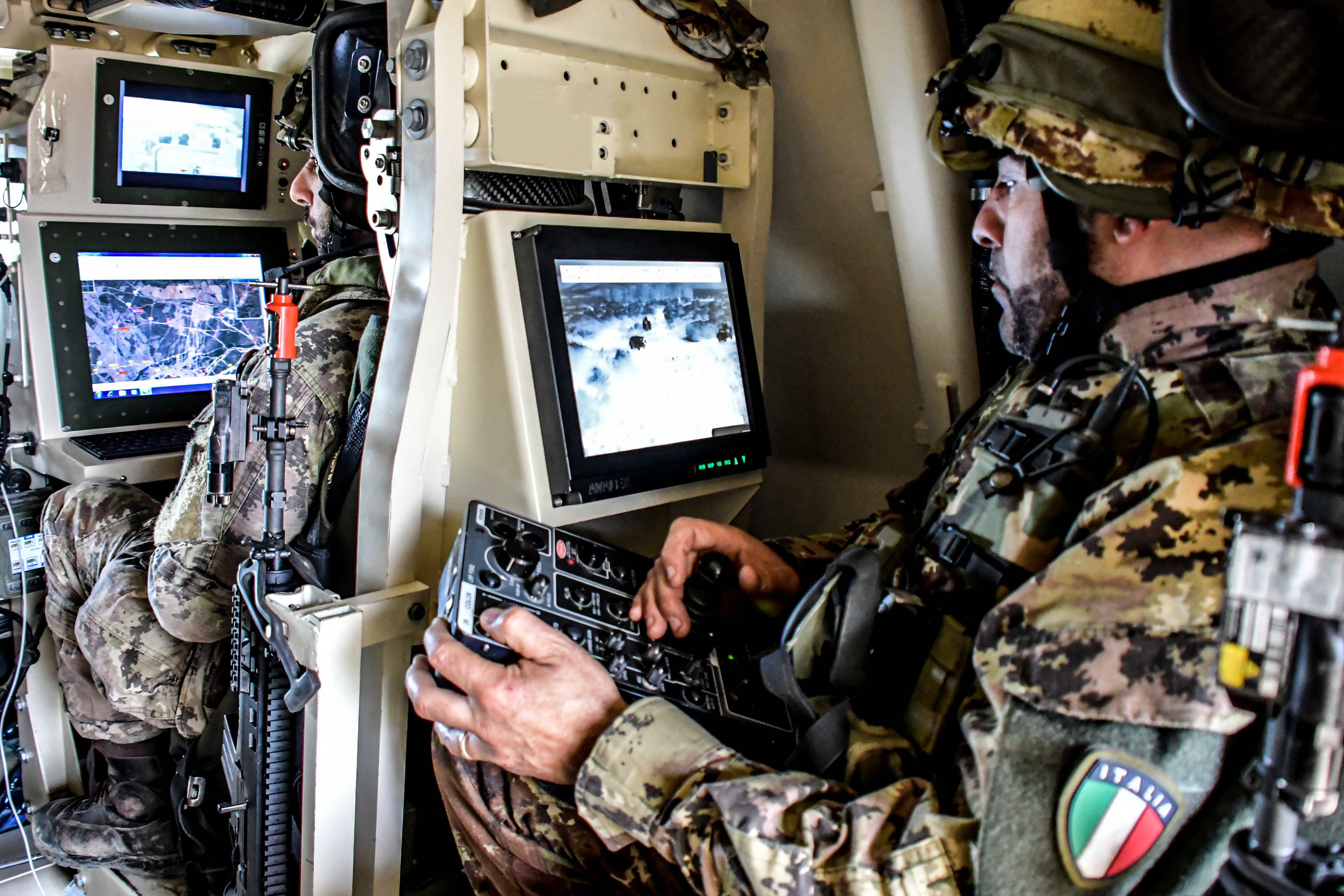
VTMM Orso Route Clearance interior

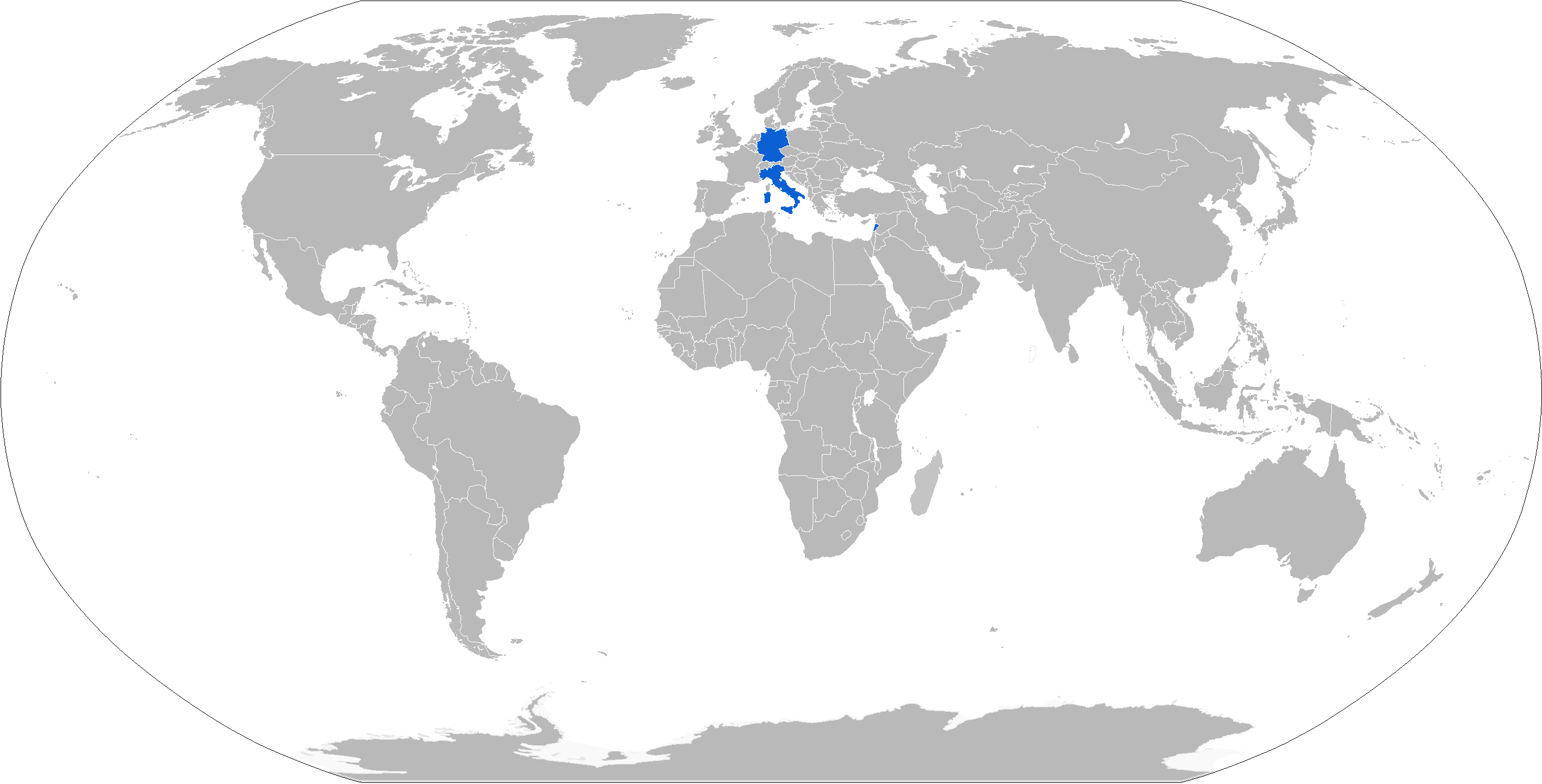
Map of KMW Grizzly operators in blue

=== Current operators ===
- Lebanon: 5 vehicles delivered from Italy (4x4 chassis variant from Iveco DV)
- Italy: Similar vehicle produced by Iveco DV with the 4x4 chassis variant. Called by Italian Army VTMM (Veicolo Tattico Medio Multiruolo; Medium Multirole Tactical Vehicles) "Orso" (Bear). 56 vehicles, 16 ambulance.

== Military Vehicles of Similar Name ==
The KMW Grizzly, named after the North American Grizzly bear shares its name with several other military vehicles:

- Blackwater USA Grizzly APC
- AVGP Grizzly
- Grizzly combat engineering vehicle, based on the M1 Abrams tank chassis

== See also ==
- AGF (Light infantry vehicle) – (Germany)
- ATF Dingo – (Germany)
- BAE Caiman – (United States)
- Boxer (Armoured Fighting Vehicle) – (Germany, Netherlands)
- LAPV Enok – (Germany)
- Mungo ESK – (Germany)
- Rheinmetall YAK – (Switzerland)
