= Beretta NARP =

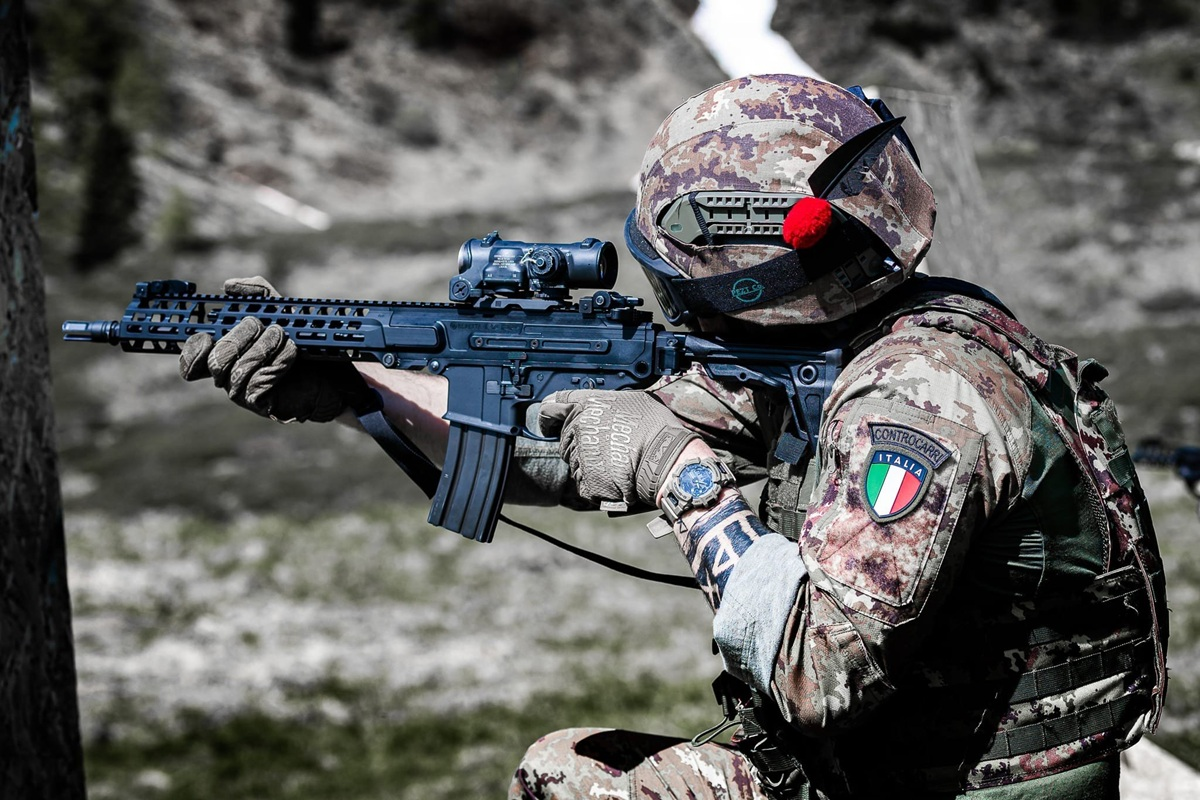
- 8th Alpini Regiment soldier with Beretta NARP rifle
- Type: Assault rifle
- Place of origin: Italy

Production history
- Designed: 2018-2023
- Manufacturer: Beretta
- Produced: 2025–present

Specifications
- Mass: 3.3 kg (7.3 lb) (with empty polymer magazine)
- Length: 888 mm (35.0 in) (stock extended); 806 mm (31.7 in) (stock collapsed)
- Width: 78 mm (3.1 in)
- Cartridge: 5.56×45mm NATO, 6.5mm Grendel
- Action: Gas-operated rotating bolt
- Rate of fire: 700 rounds/min (+/- 70)
- Feed system: 20/30-round detachable STANAG Magazine

The New Assault Rifle Platform (NARP) is an Italian modular assault rifle manufactured by Beretta.

== History ==
Developed since 2018 with input from Italian Special Forces, NARP will replace the ARX 160 service rifle as a part of a modernization plan of the Italian Armed Forces.

Beretta Defence Technologies (BDT), a British subsidiary, have announced that the NARP will be submitted to Project Grayburn, a competitive trial to find a replacement assault rifle for the British Army.

== Design ==
The NARP is chambered in 5.56×45mm NATO cartridge and available with 11,5", 14,5", and 16" barrels. It is also available in 6.5mm Grendel.

== Users ==
- France
  - GIGN
- Italy
  - As of 2026, 7,000 out of 50,000 ordered have been delivered.
