= Crawler excavator =

Type of heavy construction equipment

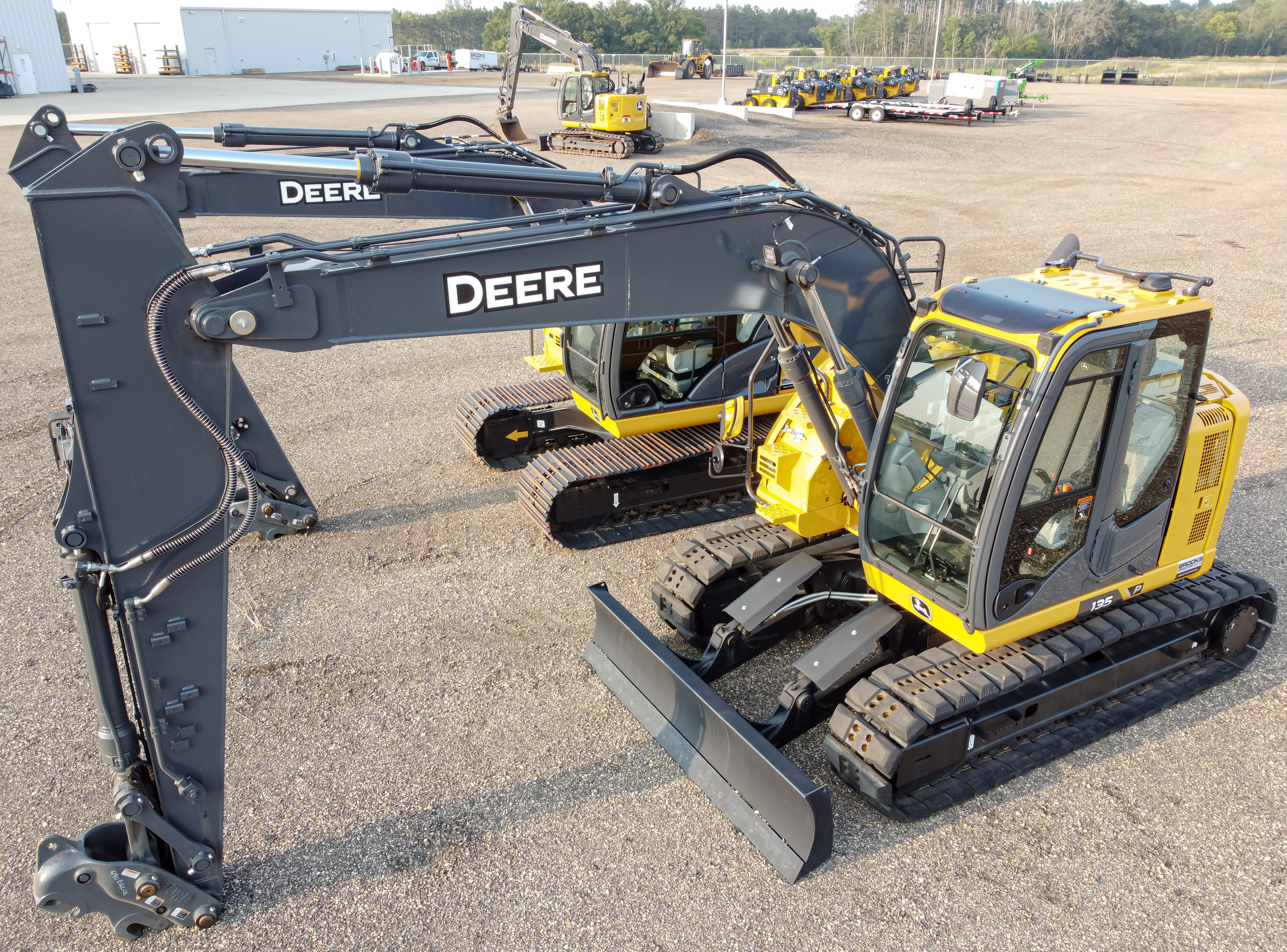
John Deere 135P excavator with rubber tracked treads

A crawler excavator, also known as a track-type excavator or tracked excavator, is a type of heavy construction equipment primarily used for excavation and earthmoving tasks. It is characterized by its tracked undercarriage, which provides superior mobility and traction compared to wheeled excavators, especially in soft, uneven, or unstable terrain.

== History ==
The history of crawler excavators can be traced back to the late 19th century, with the invention of the steam shovel in 1796. However, it wasn't until the 1830s that the first patented excavator with a mechanical boom, the Otis steam excavator, was developed. These early excavators were operated using chains or cables and were primarily used in mining and construction projects, such as of the Panama Canal in the early 20th century.

In the late 19th century, the Kilgore Machine Co. in Minneapolis patented an excavator that used a hydraulic system instead of steam power. This marked a significant step in the evolution of excavators, as hydraulic systems provided greater control and efficiency compared to the previous cable-operated designs. Throughout the 20th century, manufacturers continued to refine and improve the hydraulic systems, leading to the development of the first 360-degree rotating excavator, the Bucyrus 120-B, in 1925.

The 1920s saw the emergence of modern crawler excavators, which were mounted on tracks or wheels rather than rails, increasing their mobility and versatility. These excavators were powered by gasoline or diesel engines, further improving their performance and capabilities. The demand for construction equipment, including excavators, increased significantly during World War II, as they were used for tasks such as digging trenches and rebuilding infrastructure.

In the decades following World War II, crawler excavators continued to evolve, with manufacturers introducing a wide range of models and sizes to meet the diverse needs of the construction and mining industries. Technological advancements, such as improved hydraulic systems, more efficient engines, and the addition of various attachments, have further expanded the capabilities of crawler excavators. Today, these machines are widely used in a variety of applications, including digging, material handling, demolition, and forestry work.

== Mini-excavators ==
The 1960s saw the development of mini excavators, which were designed to fit into tight construction sites and urban environments. The YNB 300, developed by Yanmar Construction Company, was the world's first mini excavator. This compact machine was self-propelled and wheeled, making it highly maneuverable and suitable for urban construction projects.

== Features ==
The main components of a crawler excavator include:

- Undercarriage: The tracked undercarriage provides excellent stability and mobility on rough or soft ground. The tracks distribute the machine's weight over a larger area, reducing ground pressure and allowing the excavator to traverse soft, muddy, or uneven surfaces that would be impassable for wheeled equipment.
- Upperstructure: The rotating upperstructure, or "house", contains the operator's cab, engine, and hydraulic components. This allows the excavator to rotate 360 degrees, providing excellent maneuverability and the ability to dig, load, and place material from a single position.
- Boom and Dipper: The boom and dipper (or stick) are the two main structural components that support the bucket and allow for excavation, lifting, and placement of materials.
- Bucket: The bucket is the primary tool attached to the end of the dipper. Buckets come in a variety of sizes and shapes to handle different materials and applications, such as general excavation, trenching, demolition, etc.

== Applications ==
Crawler excavators are versatile machines used in a wide range of construction, mining, and infrastructure projects, including:

- Digging foundations, trenches, and pits
- Loading trucks and hoppers
- Demolition and debris removal
- Material handling and placement
- Landscaping and site preparation
- Forestry and land clearing
- Dredging and underwater excavation

The tracked undercarriage allows crawler excavators to operate effectively in soft, muddy, or uneven terrain where wheeled excavators would struggle. This makes them well-suited for applications in remote or difficult-to-access areas, as well as in sensitive environments where ground disturbance needs to be minimized.

== Configurations ==
Crawler excavators come in a wide range of sizes, from compact excavators weighing just a few tons up to massive mining-class machines weighing hundreds of tons. The size and power of the excavator is typically selected based on the specific application and job requirements.

Some key size and configuration options for crawler excavators include:

- Operating Weight: Ranging from approximately 1 to 800 tons
- Engine Power: From less than 20 hp up to 4,500 hp for the largest models
- Bucket Capacity: From less than 1 cubic yard to over 52 cubic yards
- Boom Length: Typically 20 to 425 feet, depending on the excavator size
- Tracks: Steel, rubber, or a combination for different terrains and applications

Crawler excavators are manufactured by a variety of heavy equipment companies, including Caterpillar, Komatsu, Hitachi, Volvo, Liebherr, and many others. The choice of brand and model is often based on factors such as performance, reliability, operating costs, and dealer/service support in the local market.
