= Mobile crane =

Type of heavy duty crane

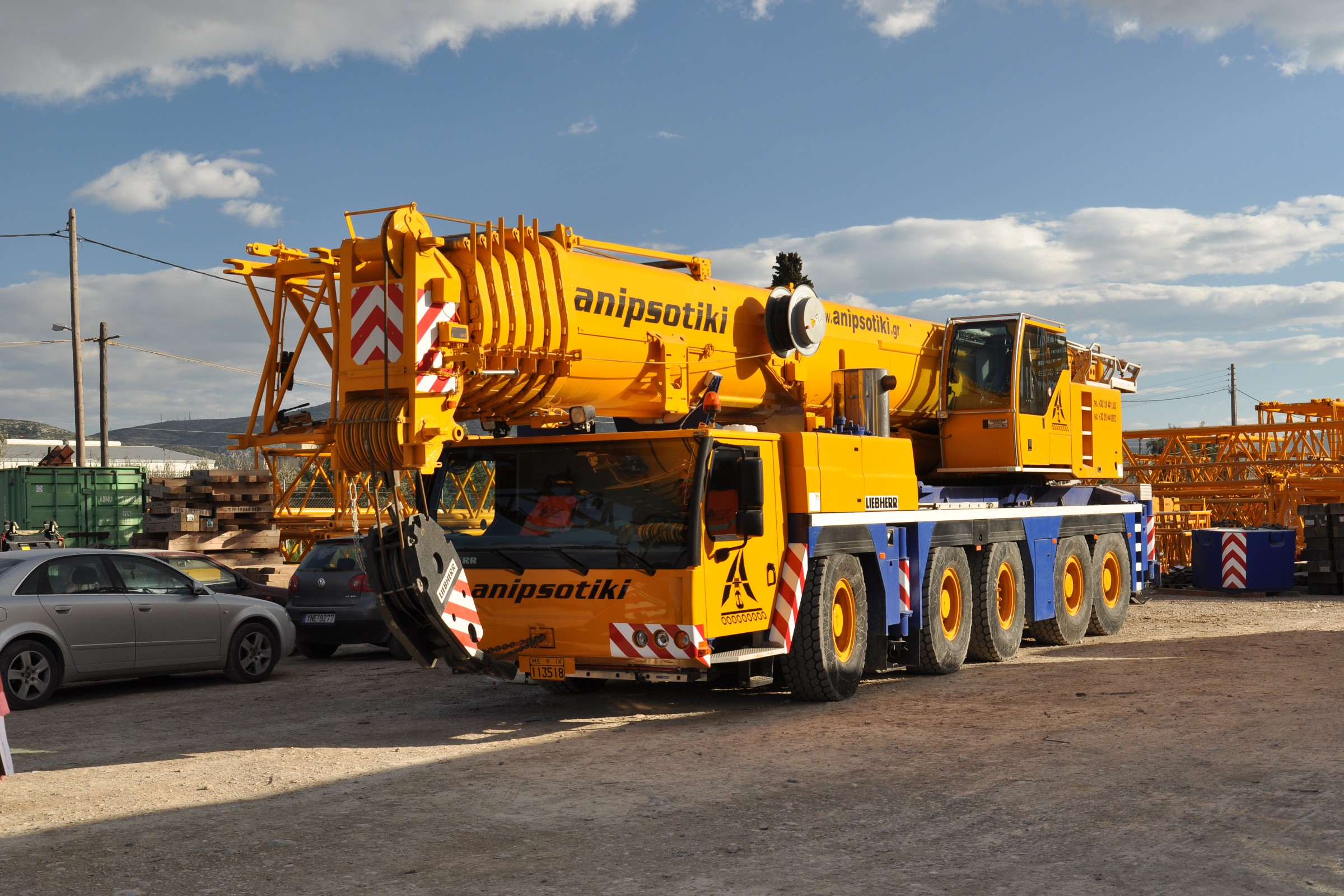
A Liebherr LTM 1200-5.1 Crane

A mobile crane is a cable-controlled crane mounted on crawlers or rubber-tired carriers or a hydraulic-powered crane with a telescoping boom mounted on truck-type carriers or as self-propelled models. They are designed to easily transport to a site and use with different types of load and cargo with little or no setup or assembly.

== Overview ==
Mobile cranes generally operate a boom, from the end of which a hook is suspended by wire rope and sheaves. The wire ropes are operated by whatever prime movers the designers have available, operating through a variety of transmissions. Steam engines, electric motors, and internal combustion engines (IC) have all been used. Older cranes' transmissions tended to be clutches. This was later modified when using IC engines to match the steam engines' "max torque at zero speed" characteristic by the addition of a hydrokinetic element, culminating in controlled torque converters. The operational advantages of this arrangement can now be achieved by electronic control of hydrostatic drives, which for size and other considerations is becoming standard. Some examples of this type of crane can be converted to a demolition crane by adding a demolition ball, or to an earthmover by adding a clamshell bucket or a dragline and scoop, although design details can limit their effectiveness.

== History ==
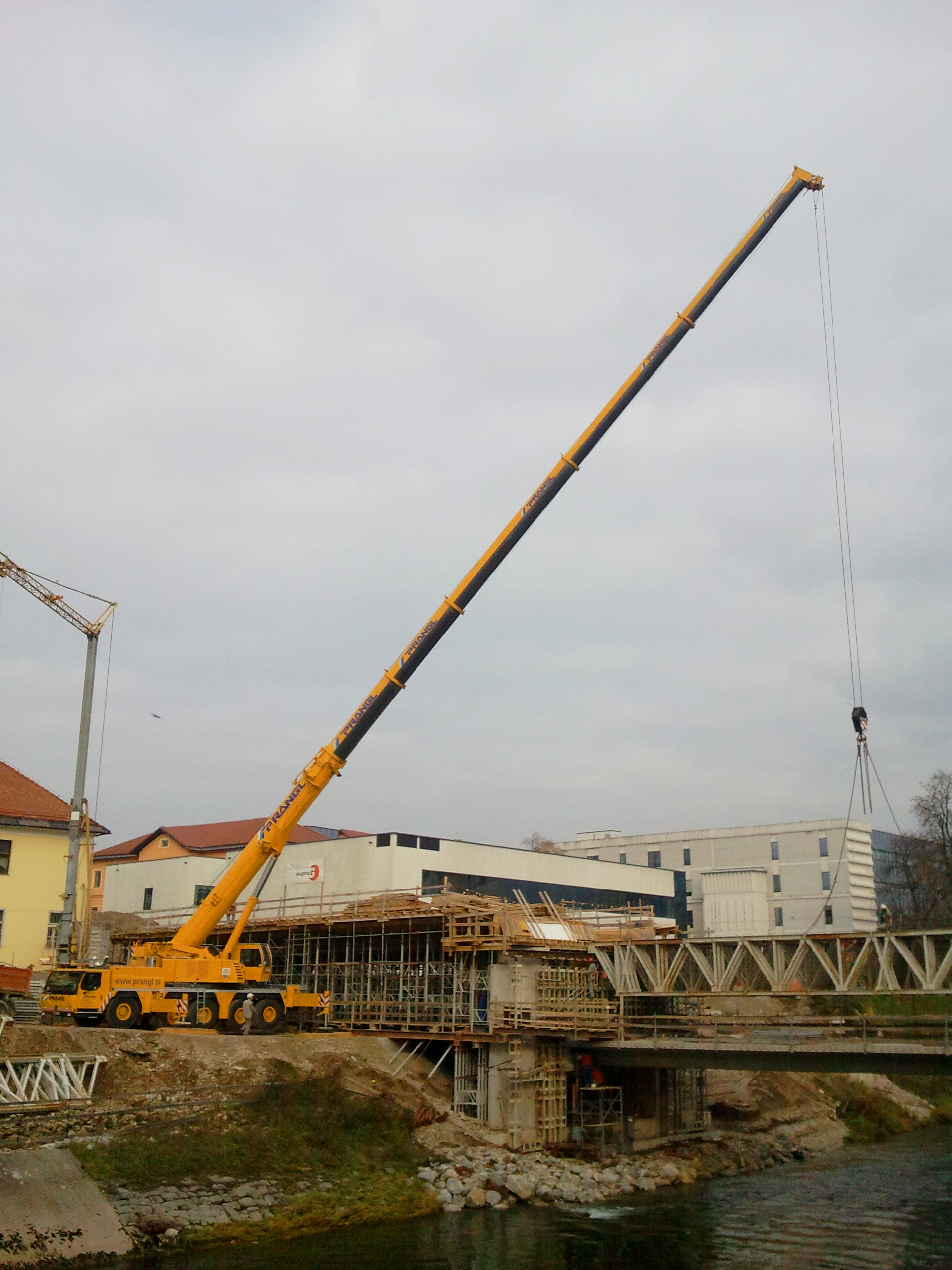
Truck-mounted crane at bridge constructing.

Before 1870 cranes were fixed to a position, except for some mounted on flatcars, railroad cranes, which provided some restricted movement. Appleby Brothers demonstrated steam-powered cranes at Paris in 1867 and Vienna in 1873. In 1922, Henry Coles, manager of Appleby Corp., began producing truck-mounted cranes under the name Petrol Electric Lorry Crane. In 1939 the Coles were acquired by Steel and Co. Ltd. of Sunderland. Hiab invented the world's first hydraulic truck mounted crane in 1947. The name, Hiab, comes from the commonly used abbreviation of Hydrauliska Industri AB, a company founded in Hudiksvall, Sweden in 1944 by Eric Sundin, a ski manufacturer who saw a way to utilize a truck's engine to power loader cranes through the use of hydraulics.

Major crane development events include adoption of the internal combustion engine in 1922 and the invention of telescopic jibs. Before 1960, cranes carried additional booms with them to increase height, which increased operating costs. In 1959 crane expert R.H.Neal, hydraulics specialist F.Taylor, and design director Bob Lester, integrated all three and modernized cranes. The Coles Hydra Speedcrane appeared in 1962, further modified with the 10-ton fully telescopic hydraulic boom in 1966, followed in 1968 by the 30-ton "Husky" military versions with four-wheel drive. In 1972, Steels was forced to merge with the Acrow Group, losing some of their most valuable employees, including Don Hassel and Johnny Johnson who started a new manufacturing processes plant. With backing from the British Crane Hire Corporation they acquired a small factory unit and ordered every single element of their product from subcontracted suppliers. In 1976, the Cosmos team created a 25-ton crane that combined several new developments.

A Liebherr heavy Crane LR 11350 lifted a dome of nuclear power plant with 281 Tonnes 62 Meter high in December 2023.

== Gallery ==
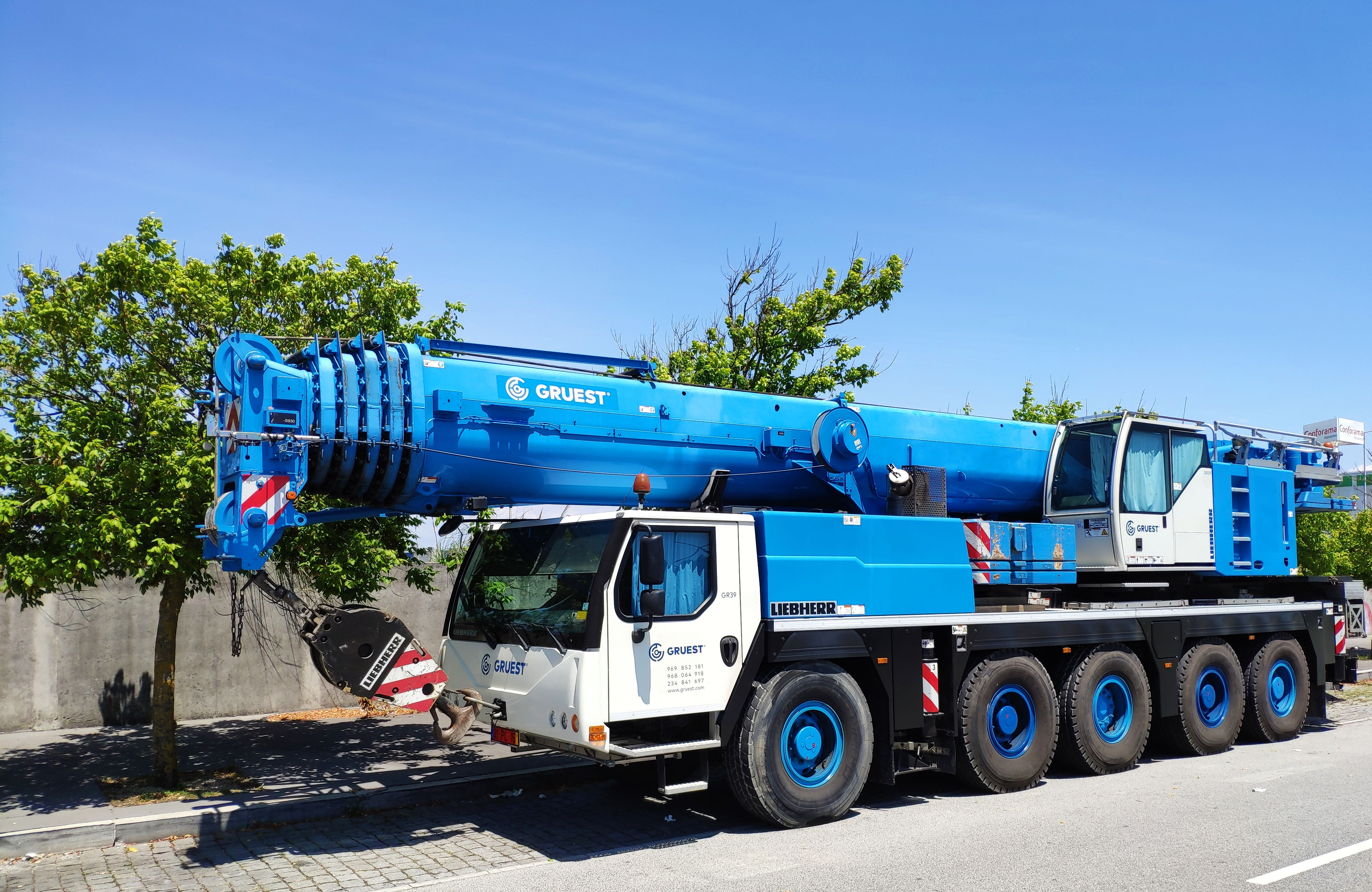
A 130t mobile crane

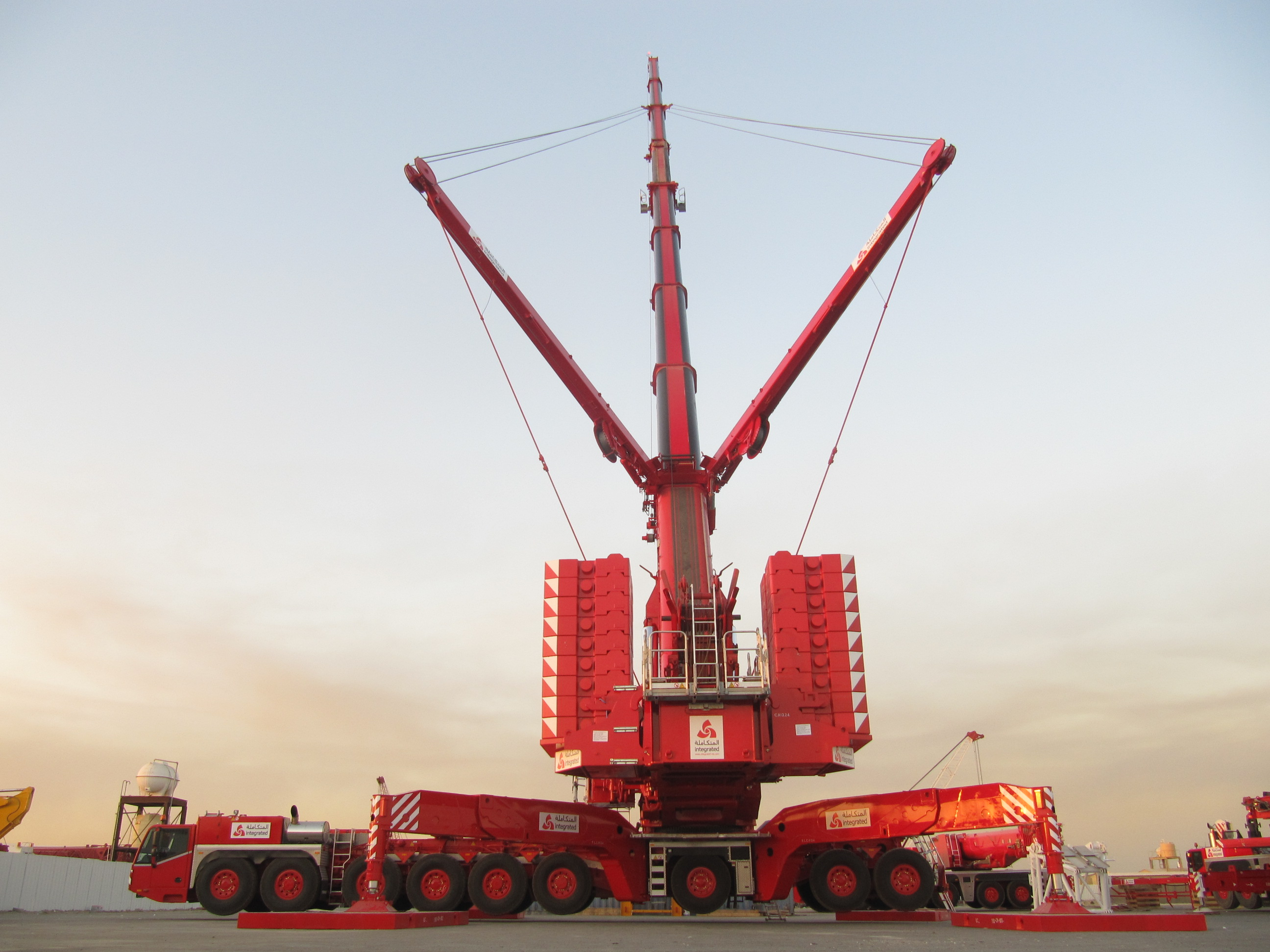
Demag AC1000, a 1000 ton mobile crane

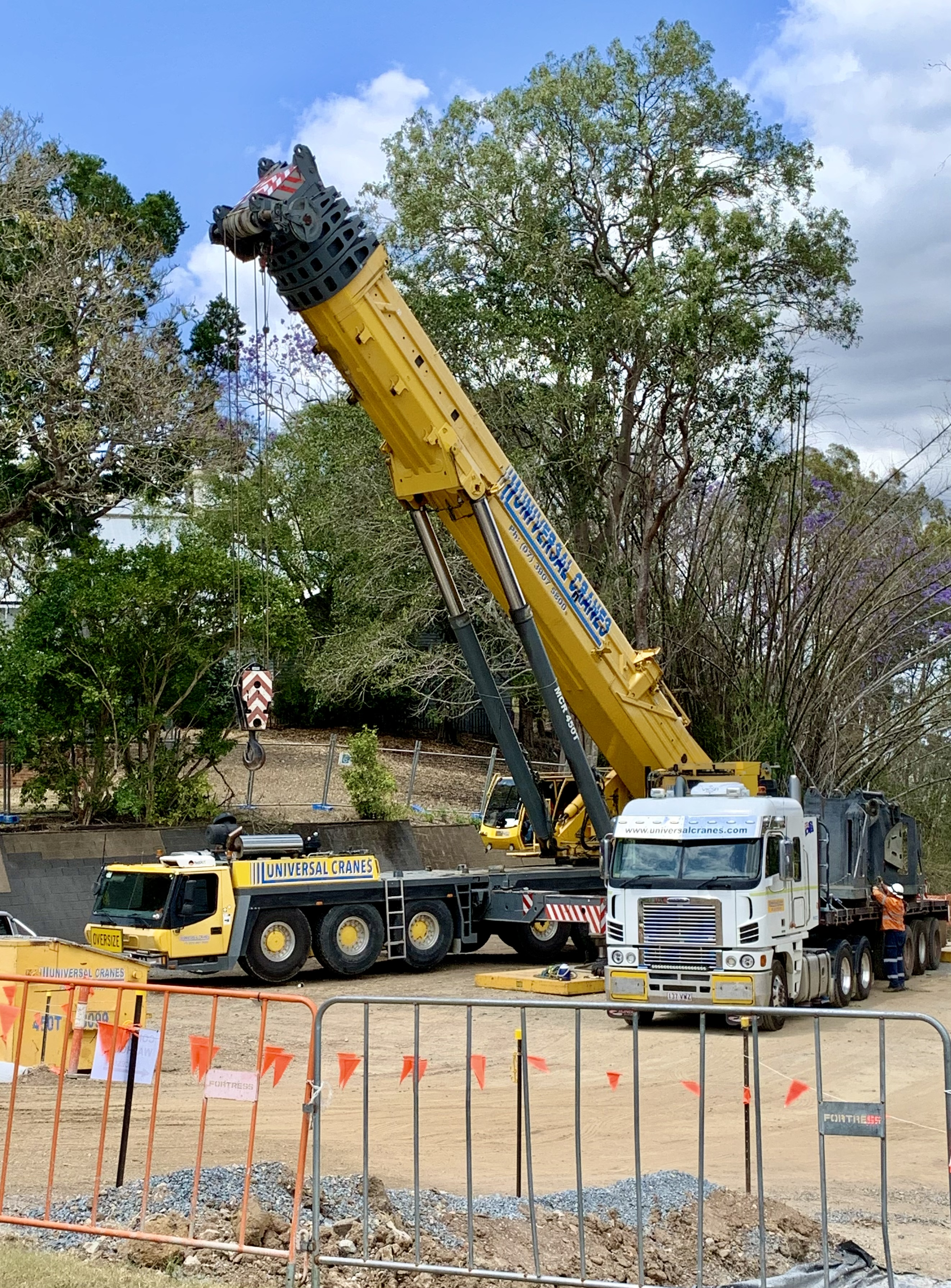
Grove mobile crane 450T, Brisbane

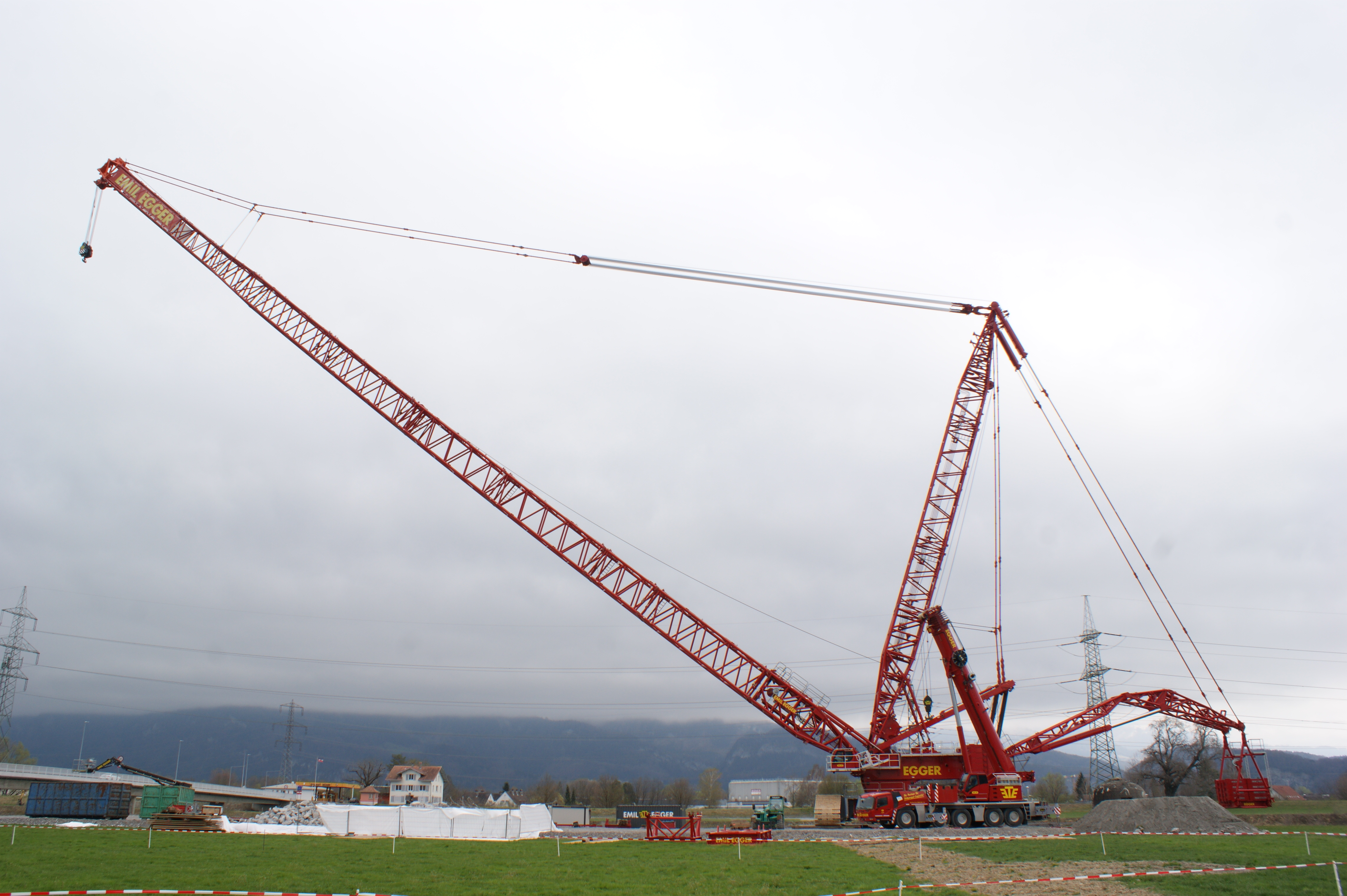
Maeder-Kriessern-Rhine-Liebherr LR 11000-32ASD
