= Telescopic handler =

Industrial machine

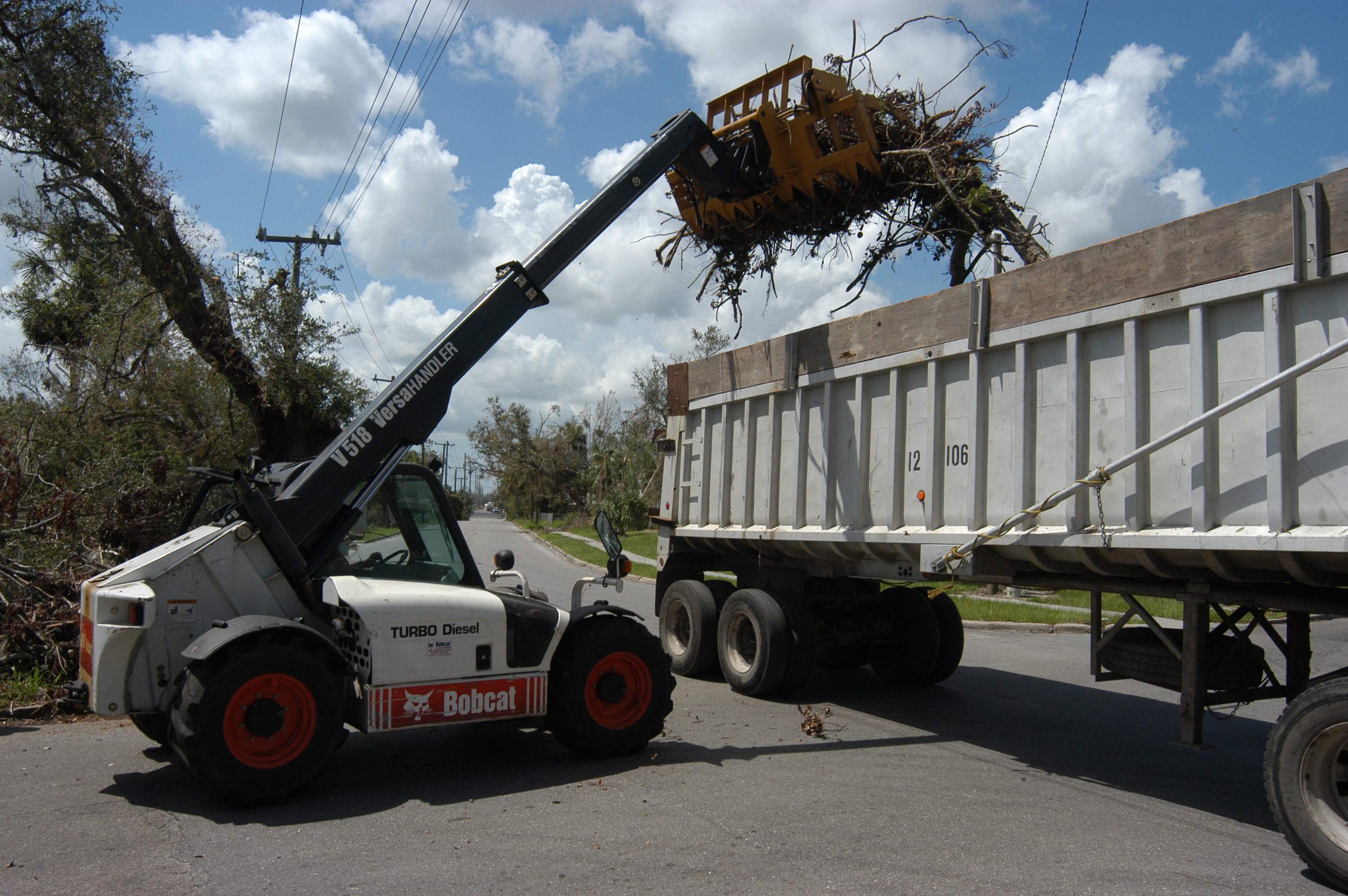
Bobcat Telescopic handler

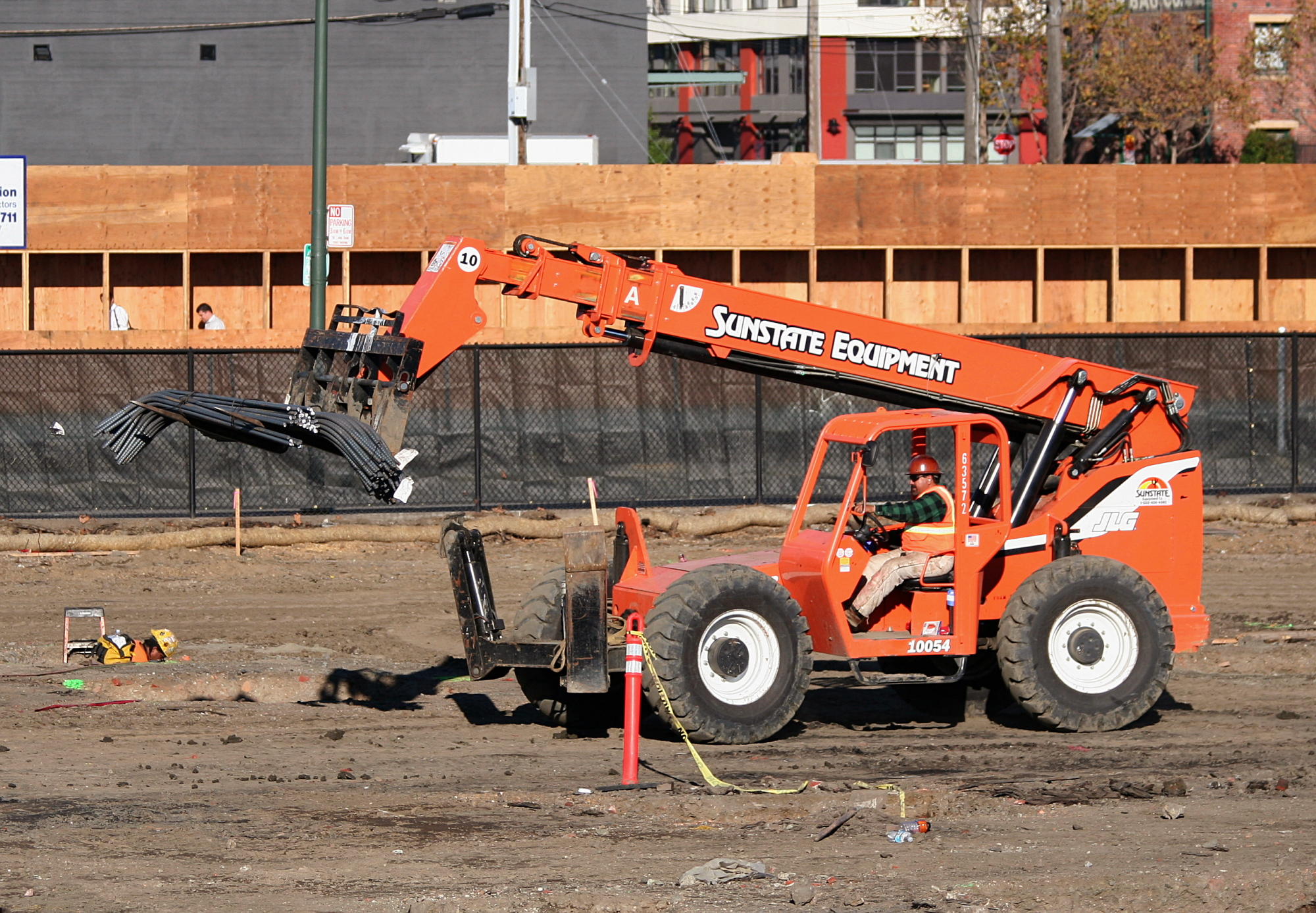
JLG telescopic handler

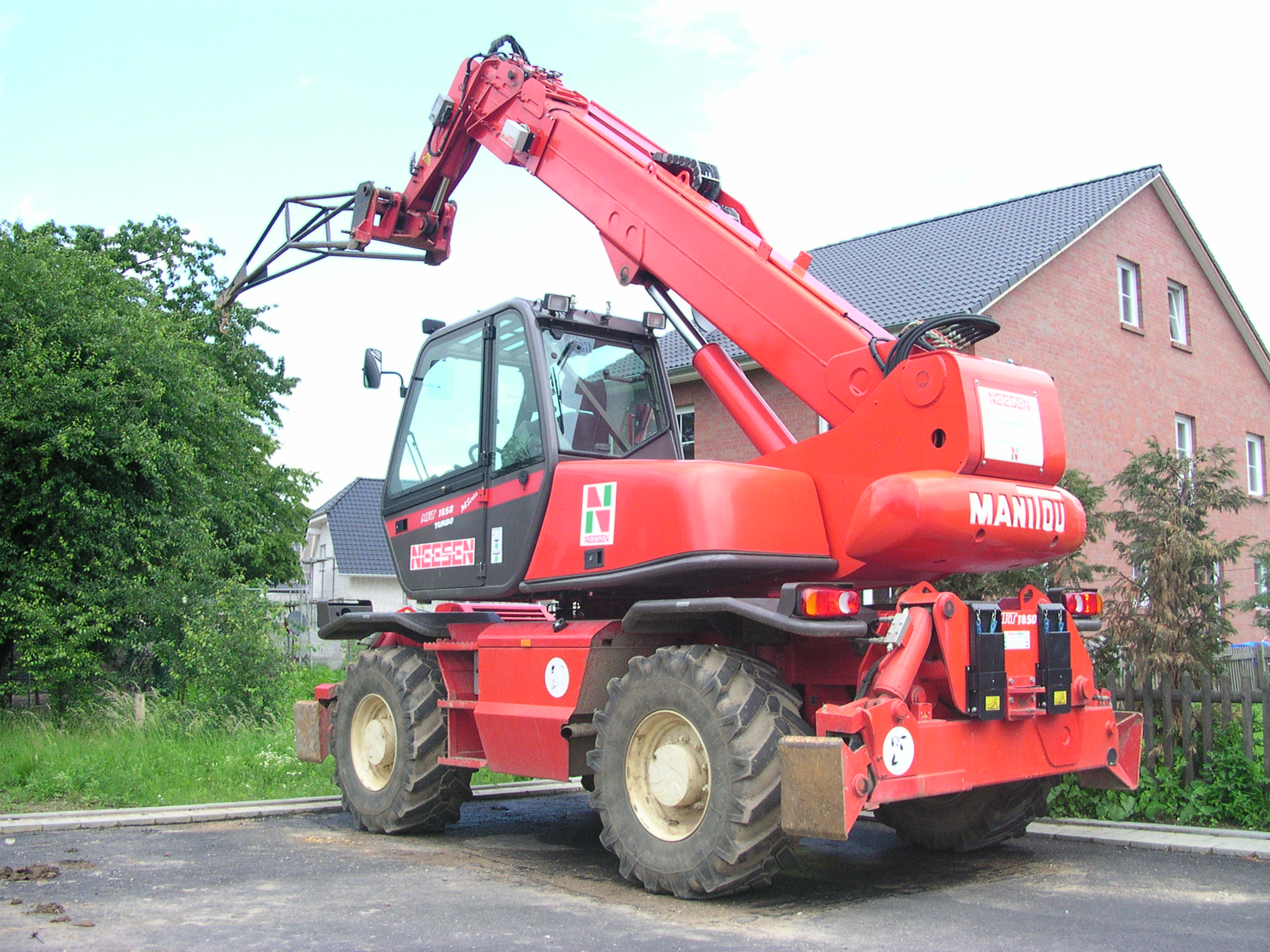
A typical rotating telescopic handler

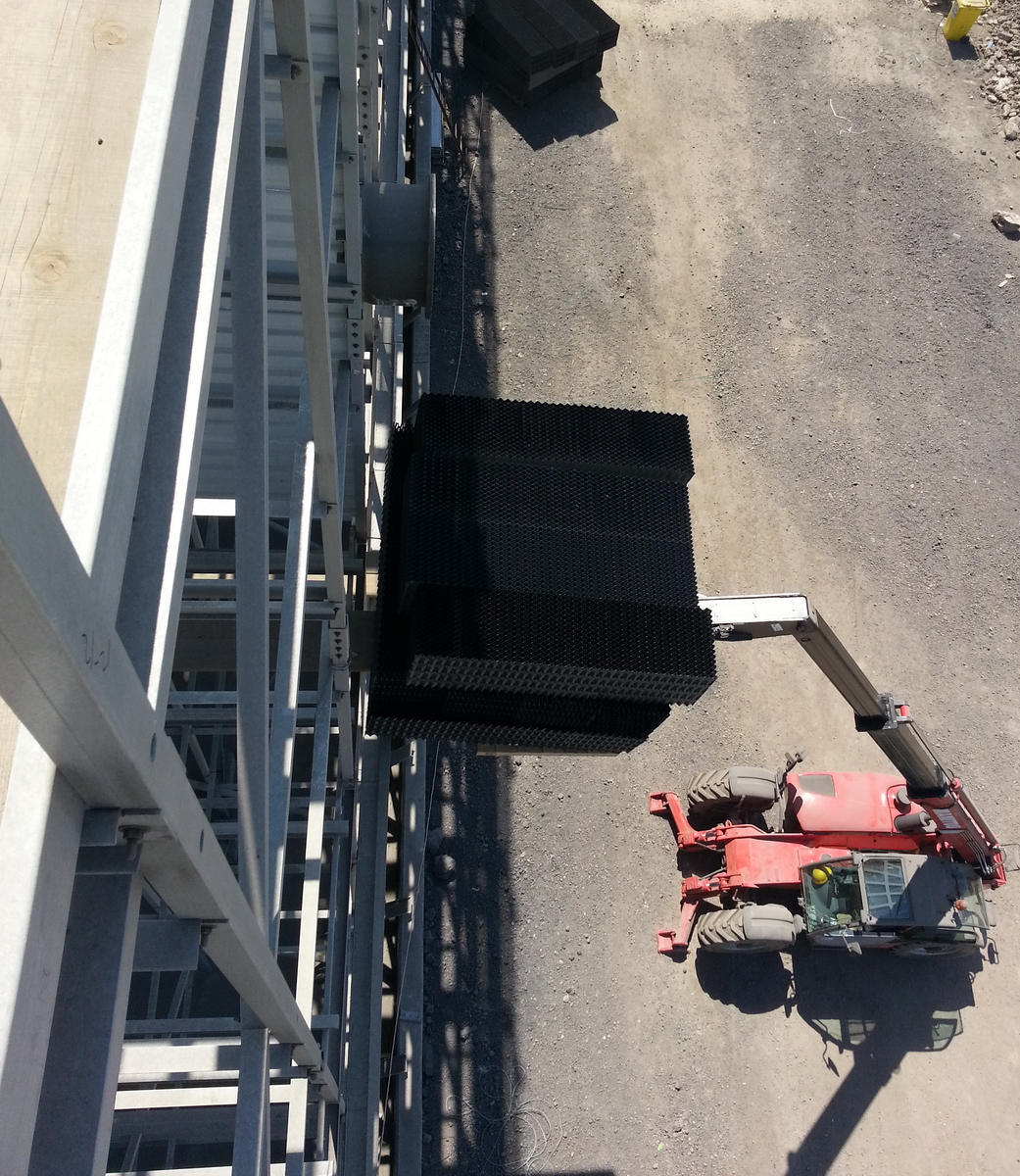
Telescopic handler used for cooling tower construction

A telescopic handler, also called a telehandler, teleporter, reach forklift, or zoom boom, is a Logistics loading and unloading equipment widely used in agriculture and industry. It is somewhat like a forklift but has a boom (telescopic cylinder), making it more a crane than a forklift, with the increased versatility of a single telescopic boom that can extend forwards and upwards from the vehicle. The boom can be fitted with different attachments, such as a bucket, pallet forks, muck grab, or winch.

== History ==
The first telescopic handler was believed to have been manufactured by French company Sambron in 1957. In 1971, Liner Construction Equipment of Hull launched the Giraffe 4WD, 4WS telehandler based on a design by Matbro who created a similar machine based on their articulated forestry machines.

JCB launched their 2WD, rear steer Loadall in October 1977. The JCB 520 was originally aimed at construction sites, the potential for agricultural uses soon followed. JCB sold 100,000 units by

== Uses ==
In industry, the most common attachment for a telehandler is pallet forks and the most common application is to move loads to and from places unreachable for a conventional forklift. For example, telehandlers have the ability to remove palletised cargo from within a trailer and to place loads on rooftops and other high places. The latter application would otherwise require a crane, which is not always practical or time-efficient.

In agriculture the most common attachment for a telehandler are buckets or bucket grabs; again the most common application is to move loads to and from places unreachable for a 'conventional machine' which in this case is a wheeled loader or backhoe loader. For example, telehandlers have the ability to reach directly into a high-sided trailer or hopper. The latter application would otherwise require a loading ramp, conveyor, or something similar.

The telehandler can also work with a crane jib for lifting loads. Attachments on the market include dirt buckets, grain buckets, rotators, and power booms. Agricultural models can also be fitted with three-point linkage and power take-off.

The advantage of the telehandler is also its biggest limitation: as the boom extends or raises while bearing a load, it acts as a lever and causes the vehicle to become increasingly unstable, despite counterweights in the rear. That means the lifting capacity quickly decreases as the working radius (distance between the front of the wheels and the centre of the load) increases. When used as a loader the single boom (rather than twin arms) is very highly loaded and is a weakness, even with careful design. A vehicle which has a 5,000 lb (2,300 kg) lift capacity with the boom retracted may be able to safely lift as little as 400 lb (180 kg) with the boom fully extended at a low angle. The same machine, with the boom retracted, may be able to support as much as 10,000 lb (4,500 kg) with the boom raised to 70°.

The operator is equipped with a load chart which helps determine whether a given task is possible, taking into account weight, boom angle and height. Failing that, most telehandlers now utilize a computer, which uses sensors to monitor the vehicle, and will warn the operator and/or cut off further control input if the limits of the vehicle are exceeded. The latter is a legal requirement in Europe, controlled by EN15000. Machines can also be equipped with front stabilizers which extend the lifting capability of the equipment while stationary. Machines that are fully stabilised with a rotary joint between upper and lower frames can be called mobile cranes. They can typically still use a bucket, and are also often referred to as 'Roto' machines, and may be considered a hybrid between a telehandler and small crane.

== Operator licensing ==
Under the laws or regulations of some national or other jurisdictional authorities, a license is required in order to operate a telehandler.

For example, in Australia, a Gold Card, issued by the Telescopic Handler Association of Australia (TSHA), can be obtained to allow the operation of telehandlers with a capacity of three tonnes or less with standard attachments, when the machine is operated from below. The Gold Card is not a legally required qualification, but verbal instruction is not considered an appropriate training method because of a lack of evidence of competency training. Competency training with evidence of learning and written assessment is legally required in Australia.

In Victoria, Australia, a WorkSafe CN licence is a legally required licence for machines with a capacity of over three tonnes with standard attachments, when the machine is operated from below. Telehandlers fitted with elevated work platform attachments, and are operated from the basket, are classified as elevated work platforms and require elevated work platform licences, such as the EWPA Yellow Card or Worksafe WP Licence. A WorkSafe C2 licence or higher may apply when using slewing-type telehandlers.

== See also ==
- Reach stacker
