= Iveco ACTL =

Italian military truck

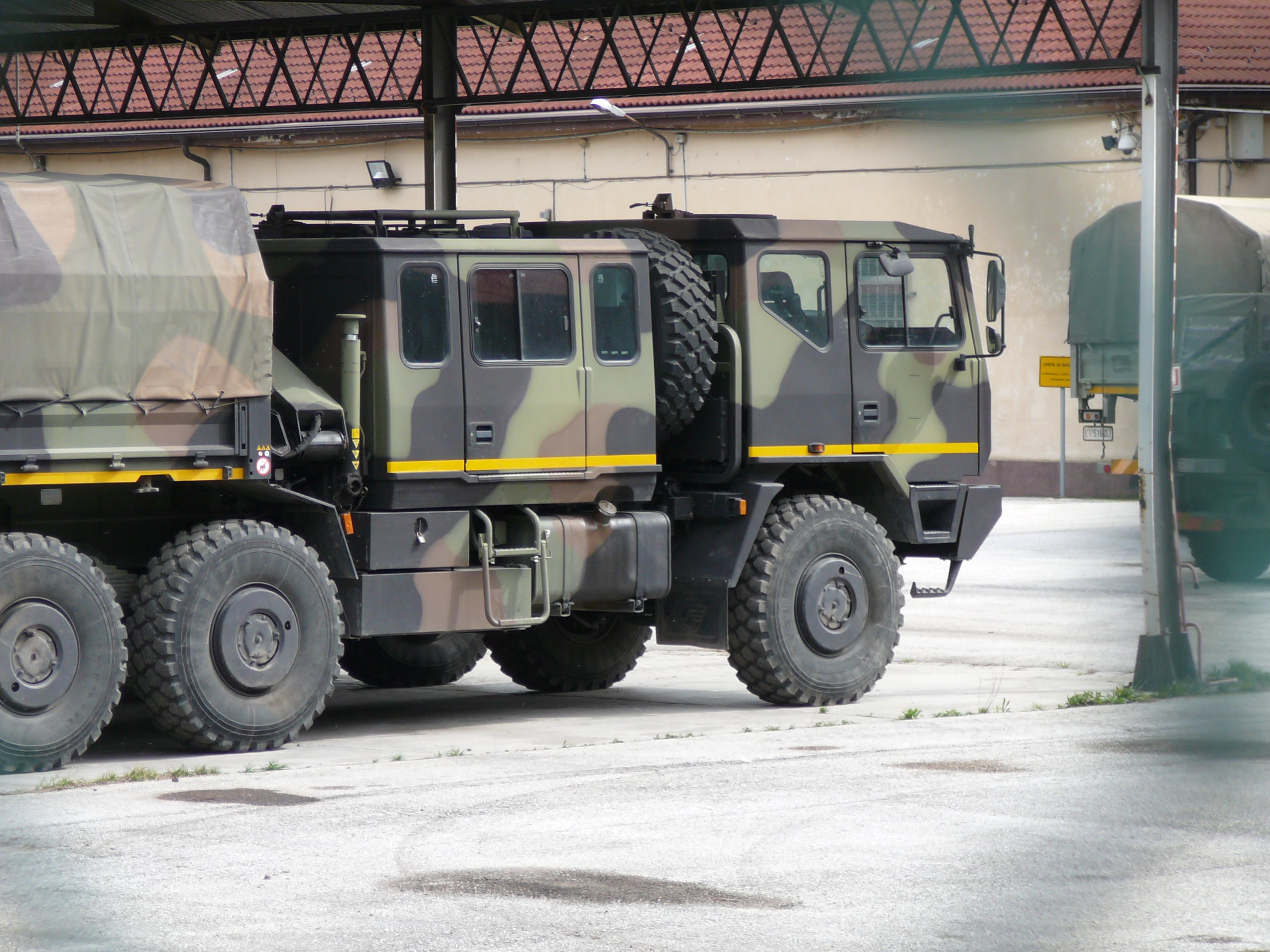
An Iveco ACTL in Trento.

Iveco ACTL is a military transport vehicle produced by Iveco for the Italian Army. It was developed to integrate and replace the previous Iveco ACM 80/90 truck.

The vehicle was introduced in 2002 in the 4×4 version and in 2000 in the 8×8 version, used for the transport of containers. The 4×4 version can be airlifted.
