= List of modern equipment of the German Army =

This page contains a list of equipment currently in service with the German Army. Concerning equipment that has recently been adopted or is in the process of being adopted, this list here somewhat overlaps with the list in the article Future equipment of the German Army. The article "Future equipment of the German Army" contains a list of equipment on order or planned to be ordered, which hasn't yet entered service in the German Army.

== Weapons ==
=== Small arms ===
| Model | Image | Origin | Type | Calibre | Notes |
Combat knives
| KM2000 | | Germany | Combat knife | – | The KM 2000 from Eickhorn is the Bundeswehr's standard combat knife. |
| GAK 4 | | Switzerland | Pocket knife | – | The GAK 4 pocket knife from Victorinox replaced the old GAK 1 from the Bundeswehr in 2009. |
Handguns
| Heckler & Koch USP; Heckler & Koch P8A1 | | Germany | Semi-automatic pistol | 9×19mm Parabellum | Current standard service pistol of the Bundeswehr. In the meantime, the pistol has been upgraded to the P8A1 version with a reinforced breech. Another variant is the P8 Combat, which differs from the P8 in the lack of a safety lever. The P8 replaced the Walther P1, Colt M1911A1, SIG P210-4 and the Astra 600/43 as the soldiers' standard pistol. To be replaced by the P13. |
| Glock 17 Gen4; Glock P9A1 | | Austria | Semi-automatic pistol | 9×19mm Parabellum | First introduced as the P9M, a 3rd generation Glock 17, and since 2014 also the P9A1, a 4th generation Glock 17. Used by combat swimmers and KSK, primarily the Navy. |
| Heckler & Koch USP; Heckler & Koch P12 | | Germany | Semi-automatic pistol | 11.43x23mm (.45 ACP) | Equivalent to the P8 in .45 ACP calibre. The P12 is used by the KSK. |
| Heckler & Koch P30; Heckler & Koch P30 | | Germany | Semi-automatic pistol | 9×19mm Parabellum | The P30 replaces the P7 in the personal protection forces of the Feldjäger troop and serves as the standard pistol in the KSK command. |
| Walther PDP; P14K (Performance Duty Pistol) | (Illustration) | Germany | Semi-automatic compact pistol | 9×19mm Parabellum | Carl Walther GmbH won the framework contract in May 2024. Programme KoWa SysPi SpezKr Bw ("Kompaktwaffe des Systems Pistole Spezialkräfte der Bundeswehr"), framework contract of 7 years to supply 3,300 compact pistols to the special forces in replacement of the H&K P30 and the P9A1 (Glock 17 3rd generation). Accessories: signature silencer: B&T Impuls-XM; reflex sight Aimpoint ACRO P2 (compact red dot sight) |
| Heckler & Koch P11; Heckler & Koch P11 | | Germany | Underwater pistol | 7.62×36mm | The P11 is only used by the combat swimmers as an underwater pistol. |
| .22 Derringer Sidewinder | (Illustration) | Germany | Mini revolver | .22 caliber | |
Submachine guns
| Heckler & Koch MP5A5 | | West Germany | Submachine gun | 9×19mm Parabellum | Used by KSK, combat swimmers, military police and long-distance scouts within the Bundeswehr in various versions. It used to be part of the standard equipment of the boarding teams. It is to be replaced by the Heckler & Koch 437 (G39). |
| Heckler & Koch MP5K | | West Germany | Submachine gun | 9×19mm Parabellum | Used by the KSK and the Feldjäger soldiers. |
| Heckler & Koch MP5SD6 | | West Germany | Submachine gun | 9×19mm Parabellum | |
| Heckler & Koch MP7A1 | | Germany | PDW | 4.6×30mm HK | The MP7 is used in the infantryman of the future concept and in the derived project "Soldat in action - SiE", as well as in the military police. It should continue to be procured and completely replace the MP2 (German designation for Uzi) (as of 2019). |
| Heckler & Koch 437; G39 | (Illustration) | Germany | PDW | 7.62×35mm (.300 AAC Blackout) | 176 ordered in February 2024 for the special forces. A total of 988 rifles is intended to replace the HK MP5SD. The final design of the rifle was presented in September 2026. |
Assault rifles / battle rifles
| Heckler & Koch G36 (multiple variants) | | Germany | Assault rifle / carabine | 5.56×45mm NATO | Service rifle that replaced the HK G3. The weapons were delivered to the Bundeswehr from 1996 to 2014, with an expected service life of 20 years. In 2015, 176,544 G36s had been purchased and 166,619 were in use. As of 2019, the versions in use are the A0 to A4 and the shorter variant kA1 to kA4. The variants A3 and kA3 are part of the equipment of the Infanterist der Zukunft. The variant A4 removes a push-to-talk switch on the weapon. As part of the maintenance, all defective G36s are upgraded to version A4. The HK416A8 was selected to replace the G36 in December 2022; the weapon would be designated the G95. |
| Heckler & Koch G95; G95A1 and G95KA1 | – | Germany | Assault rifle / carabine | 5.56×45mm NATO | 250,000 new standard service rifle ordered. They were selected in December 2022. It entered service in December 2025. Specifications and accessories: Standard barrel likely 16.5 inches (G95A1), for the short barrel variant, likely 14 inches (G95KA1).; 5.56×45mm NATO; Standard optical sight, the adjustable ELCAN SpecterDR, 1-4 times.; Laser/light module LLM-VarioRay by Rheinmetall.; Funding approvals: December 2022: 118,718 rifles (€209 million); Firm order in January 2023: 13,929 G95A1; 3,104 G95KA1; December 2025: framework agreement amended to 250,000 rifles, followed by the order of the entirety of the amendment.; Deliveries: May 2025, first deliveries for trials; Plan for 250,000 additional to be ordered as of August 2026. |
| Heckler & Koch HK416 A7; G95K | – | Germany | Assault rifle | 5.56×45mm NATO | The KSK introduced the G95K in service in 2019 as their new standard assault rifle, replacing the HK G36. It was selected after having been tested in 2017. 1,745 weapons were ordered. Accessories: Eotech supplied the reflector sight EXPS 3-0 NV and its red dot magnifier G33™; a mission silencer B&T MARS and a practice silencer are provided; Rheinmetall supplied the LM-VTAL, a tactical laser and light module, and the TL-MISSIONLIGHT; the combat swimmers received an Aimpoint sight; ERATAC BUIS (back up iron sight); B&T mono bloc silencer |
| Heckler & Koch HK417; G27P | (Illustration) | Germany | Battle rifle | 7.62×51mm NATO | Used by the regular a member of an infantry squad to increase the fire power on the battlefield. 600 were ordered in this variant with the 16'' barrel. |
| Heckler & Koch HK417 A2; G27K | (Illustration) | Germany | Battle rifle | 7.62×51mm NATO | Ordered in December 2010 to be used by the KSK. 157 were ordered with a 13'' barrel (108 for the army, 49 in use with the Navy KSK). |
Precision rifles
| Heckler & Koch HK417; G28 | | Germany | DMR | 7.62×51mm NATO | Acquisition of 560 units. The basis is the HK MR308, a civilian version of the HK417. The Special Forces Command uses the DMR 762, which was procured in a military version as the DMR G28. It succeeded to the G36 SSG-KR. |
| Heckler & Koch MR308 A6; G210; Scharfschützenwaffe kurze Reichweite | – | Germany | DMR | 7.62×51mm NATO | New short range precision rifle ordered for the KSK in August 2024, to be delivered by 2025. The weapon is to be equipped with a Schmidt & Bender 5-20 × 50 PM II Ultra Short rifle scope.: Agreement for 500 rifles |
| Accuracy International AWC; G25 | – | United Kingdom | Bolt action sniper rifle | 7.62×51mm NATO | Used by the KSK. |
| Accuracy International AWM-F; G22A2 | | United Kingdom; Germany (A2) | Bolt action sniper rifle | 7.62×67mmB | Intended to be used against man targets up to 800 meters and against tactical targets such as radar systems, helicopters or unarmoured vehicles up to 1000 meters. According to the principles of use, the G22 is intended for defensive or reactive use ("counter-sniping"). However, an offensive use of the weapon is also possible. As of 2019, all 780 rifles have been upgraded to standard A2. |
| Haenel RS9; G29 | | Germany | Bolt action sniper rifle | 8.6×70mm | 115 Bolt-action sniper rifle RS9 by C.G. Haenel for the special forces. Accessories: Steiner Optik M5Xi 5-25×56; 10-cartridge magazine; Ilaflon coating in the color RAL8000. |
| Barrett M82A1; G82A1 | | United States | Anti materiel sniper rifle | 12.7×99mm NATO | Introduced to the Bundeswehr as a long-range rifle as part of the Infantryman of the Future project and is considered an alternative when the G36 and G22 reach their performance limits. In the G82A1 version, the weight was reduced by 2.5 kg through the use of titanium and aluminum and three additional Picatinny rails were added to the housing. |
| Accuracy International AW50; G24 | | United Kingdom | Anti materiel sniper rifle | 12.7×99mm NATO | Accuracy International Ltd. sniper rifle procured for the special forces before the introduction of the G82 (AW50). Used by the combat swimmers and the KSK. |
Machine guns
| Heckler & Koch 123; MG4A3 | | Germany | LMG | 5.56×45mm NATO | The MG4 was developed and introduced as part of the Infantryman of the Future project. There are currently five versions for different purposes. These are to be consolidated into three versions in the future, but already have a high level of logistical equality (123 transferable parts) as well as similar usability and the same security concept. |
| Rheinmetall MG3 | | West Germany | GPMG | 7.62×51mm NATO | The MG3 is a further development of the MG42 from the Second World War and is still used in the Bundeswehr today. Since production already ended in the 1970s, it is currently planned to have several thousand new cases milled. As of 2019, it remains in use primarily on combat vehicles as an anti-aircraft gun, but also as a machine gun. |
| Heckler & Koch 121; MG5A2 | | Germany | GPMG | 7.62×51mm NATO | Intended to replace MG3. The MG5A1 can be integrated into the FLW100 remote-controlled weapon stations and the KMW1530 mechanical mounts. Adapters are also to be introduced for the MG5A2 so that it can be used on MG3 mounts. The 15,000th rifle was delivered to the Bundeswehr by May 2025. |
| Heckler & Koch 11A1; G8A1 | | West Germany | GPMG | 7.62×51mm NATO | The weapon is only used by KSK and Feldjäger soldiers. From the A1 variant onwards, the machine gun has a stepped piston for better grip and control. From this version onwards, the barrel had a polygonal profile and it was possible to attach a rifle scope to the weapon. |
| M2HB Browning; MG50-1 | | United States; Belgium | HMG | 12.7×99mm NATO | Standard heavy machine gun for the German Army (Bundeswehr designation "Maschinengewehr Kaliber .50"). Used mostly as vehicle armament, for example on the LIV (SO) Serval. |
| Minigun M134D-H; MG6 | | United States | Rotary Machine gun | 7.62×51mm NATO | Used on H145M helicopters, vehicles smaller boats, and can be used by infantry troops on tripods. |
| Nexter P20 | | France | Automatic cannon | 20×102mm | Used with the Defenture VECTOR by the special forces (KSK), on the AGF Serval. |
Shotguns
| Remington Model 870; Mehrzweckflinte 1 (MZF1) | | United States | Pump action shotgun | 12 gauge | Pump-action shotgun for slugs - used by KSK, Feldjäger, combat swimmers and the boarding teams. |
Protocol service weapons
| Walther P1 | | West Germany | Semi-automatic pistol | 9×19mm Parabellum | The P8 replaced the P1 in the Bundeswehr, but is still in use in some units and is also part of general basic training. The P1 is still worn today by the military police and the Wachbattalion in conjunction with the white gear during protocol service. The Walther P1 is based on the Wehrmacht's P38. The P1 is only used in protocol service. It is subject to a waiver of use. |
| Mauser Karabiner 98k | | Nazi Germany; West Germany | Bolt action rifle | 7.92×57mm Mauser | The Karabiner 98 is only used for protocol service in the guard battalion (German: Wachbataillon) at the Federal Ministry of Defence. |
Emergency signalling
| Heckler & Koch P2A1; Heckler & Koch P2A1 | | Germany | Flare gun | 26.5mm | Flare gun for signaling and battlefield illumination. Framework agreement signed in 2025 for up to 10,000 additional pistols, and a base order of 2,711 pistols. |
| H&K FHK; Notsignalgerät 19mm | | Germany | Flare gun | 19×36mm | Cartridge SIG P WEISZ 19 PPF3.96 VB09.99. |
Grenades
| DM51 hand grenade | | Germany | Fragmentation grenade | 57mm | The DM51 is the Bundeswehr's standard hand grenade. It was adopted in 1975 to replace the DM41. The practice hand grenade of the DM51 bears the designation DM58. 100,000 DM51A3 ordered in September 2024. Framework agreement approved in December 2024 for the order of DM51 grenades with DM82 fuses. It was followed by a firm order of 557,400 grenades ordered in March 2025. |
| Rheinmetall DM45 | – | Germany | Smoke hand grenade | – | In service since the mid-1990s. 962,860 additional ordered in 2024, up to 1.5 million smoke hand grenade in framework agreement. |
Grenade launchers and ammunition
| Heckler & Koch HK69A1; Granatpistole AG40-1A1 | | West Germany | Grenade launcher | 40×46mm LV | The 40 mm grenade pistol is a standalone secondary weapon. |
| Heckler & Koch GLM | | Germany | Grenade launcher | 40×46mm LV | The HK GLM is a further development of the HK AG36 and was specially developed for use on the HK416A5/A8 and HK417A2. |
| Heckler & Koch AG36; Granatabschussgerät 40mm | | Germany | Under-barrel grenade launcher | 40×46mm LV | Used as under-barrel grenade launcher with the Heckler & Koch G36. |
| Steyr Arms GL40 A1 | | Austria | Under-barrel grenade launcher | 40×46mm LV | Agreement between the Army in Steyr in April 2024 for the supply of new grenade launcher to be affixed to the new HK416 (G95) assault rifles and other rifles in service (G27P, G27K): Agreement for up to 4,776 launchers April 2024. |
| Heckler & Koch GMG; Granatmaschinenwaffe A1 | | Germany | AGL | 40×53mm HV | Sometimes used as vehicle armament on vehicles such as the TPz Fuchs, Mungo ESK, Boxer, or Fennek. |
| Rheinmetall DM131 | – | Germany | Grenade, airburst munition | 40×53mm HV | Additional order in February 2024 for €22.9 million. |
| Rheinmetall DM158 | – | Germany | Practice grenade | 40×53mm HV | 200,000 additional rounds ordered in February 2024 for €7.18 million. |
Anti-tank weapons
| FFV M2 Carl Gustav; Leuchtbüchse 84 mm | | Sweden | Recoilless rifle | 84mm | Former standard AT weapon of West Germany, now used only for firing signal ammunition in training scenarios. Bundeswehr designation "Schwere Panzerfaust 84 mm/Leuchtbüchse 84 mm". Some surplus examples display "PzB 84-1 (i.e. Panzerbüchse 84-1)" markings on the receiver. |
| RGW 60; Panzerfaust Leicht KSK | | Germany | Light recoilless gun | 60mm | Used by the Special forces. 1,087 additional ordered in 2020: 689 RGW 60 HEAT (DM 52); 398 RGW 60 HESH (DM 62); Light variant of RGW 90. |
| RGW 90 MATADOR; Wirkmittel 90 | | Germany; Israel; Singapore | Recoilless gun | 90 mm | LRMP version (long range multi-purpose), range: 1,200m, used under the designation "Wirkmittel 90", Matador-AS (Anti-Structure) used under the designation "RGW90". Approval for €50 million for the purchase of additional systems in January 2025. |
| Panzerfaust 3 | | Germany | | 110mm | Standard infantry AT weapon.3,500 additional ordered in 2022, the DM72A1 warhead, also known as Panzerfaust 3-IT, an anti-tank tandem warhead. Approval for €50 million for the purchase of additional systems in January 2025. |
| MELLS Spike LR; Mehrrollenfähiges Leichtes Lenkflugkörper-System (MELLS) | | Israel; Germany | ATGM | 152mm | 525 iCLU launcher units, 4,326 Spike LR missiles: 1,160 Spike LR ordered in 2011; 1,000 Spike LR ordered in 2017; 1,500 Spike LR ordered in November 2019; 666 Spike LR ordered in March 2021 |
| MELLS Spike LR 2 Mehrrollenfähiges Leichtes Lenkflugkörper-System 2 (MELLS 2) | | Israel; Germany | ATGM | 152mm | Orders of Spike LR2 missiles: €700 million contract in September 2024 |
| MBDA Enforcer; Leichtes Wirkmittel 1800+ | | Germany | ATGM | 90mm | Ordered in December 2019, first to be operational in 2024.: 850 missiles ordered in 2019 to be supplied to the KSK first, delivery 2023 / 2024 for €76 million.; Framework agreement for up to 2,237 additional missiles in total, deliveries that would be possible until 2026.; Range up to 2,000 meters. |
Mines
| AT2 mine | | Germany | Anti-tank mine | – | 3 variants: DM 1233 (for 110 mm LARS); DM 1274 (for Skorpion mine laying system); DM 1399 (for M270 and MiWs Skorpion) |
| DM-22 PARM-2 | | Germany | Anti-tank off-route mine | 132mm | Operating remotely-controlled or autonomously. |
| FFV 028 SN; DM 31 | | Sweden | Anti-tank mine | – | Laid by trailer, 1.2 million were produced for Bundeswehr. |
Light mortars
| RSG60; Leichtes Wirkmittel indirektes Feuer | – | Germany | Infantry mortar | 60mm | 159 ordered by the German armed forces with 24,400 rounds, to be shared between the army, the air force, the navy, the special forces and the artillery and technical schools. Developed by Rheinmetall for the German Army and the KSK special forces. |

=== Fire control systems ===
| Model | Image | Origin | Type | Used with | Weapon type | Quantity | Notes |
|---|---|---|---|---|---|---|---|
| IEA MIL-OPTICS SMASH X4 | – | Germany | Fire control sight (anti-drone) | HK417; G27P | Battle rifle | Up to 500 | Target assistance systems for detection and “kinetic defense of Class 1 UAS". Ordered to equip the G27P rifle. |
| FN Herstal FCU 1.5M; FN Feuerleitgerät 40 | – | Belgium | Fire control unit | HK AG36; Granatabschussgerät 40mm | Under-barrel grenade launcher | – | The system features a ballistic computer, and a laser range-finder. |
| Rheinmetall Vingmate FCS 4500 | | Germany | Fire control unit | HK GMG; Granatmaschinen waffe A1 | Automatic grenade launcher | – | The system features a ballistic computer, and a laser range-finder. |
| Hensoldt Dynahawks | | Germany | Fire control sight (for man-portable anti-tank systems) | MBDA Enforcer | Anti-tank guided missile | – | The system features: telescopic sight with 5.5 × magnification; a ballistic computer; a laser range-finder; can be combined with a Hensoldt IRV-MR night vision attachment; Orders: 2016, for KSK; August 2024; Option for further systems to be delivered in 2026 |
| Hensoldt Dynahawks | | Germany | Fire control sight (for man-portable anti-tank systems) | RGW 90 | Recoilless gun | – | The system features: telescopic sight with 5.5 × magnification; a ballistic computer; a laser range-finder; can be combined with a Hensoldt IRV-MR night vision attachment; Orders: 2016, for KSK; August 2024; Option for further systems to be delivered in 2026 |
| Integrated Control Launch Unit | | Israel; Germany | Fire control sight (for anti-tank guided missile) | Spike LR | Anti-tank guided missile | 525 | Orders: 311 ordered in June 2009; 97 ordered in March 2017; 214 ordered in November 2019 |
| Integrated Control Launch Unit | | Israel; Germany | Fire control sight (for anti-tank guided missile) | Spike LR2 | Anti-tank guided missile | 525 | Orders: 311 ordered in June 2009; 97 ordered in March 2017; 214 ordered in November 2019 |

== Base equipment ==
=== Uniforms of the Bundeswehr ===
==== Camouflage ====
| Model | Image | Origin | Pattern type | Environment / colours | Notes |
|---|---|---|---|---|---|
| Flecktarn-B; 5-Farben-Tarndruck | | Germany | Flecktarn | Temperate / central Europe | Standard camo in use in the German Army since 1991. It is made for temperate climates, typically western / north-west Europe. The colours of the camoulage are: light green (15%); light olive (20%); dark green (35%); brown (20%); black (10%); To be replaced by the Multitarn (6-Farben-Tarndruck) with the new equipment to be received by the German Army in 2028-29. |
| Tropentarn; 3-Farben-Tarndruck | | Germany | Flecktarn | Arid / desert | Desert camo in use by the German Army for battle dress uniforms in desert and semi-arid regions.It was mostly deployed in Afghanistan. The colours of the camouflage are sand, brown and green. |
| Multitarn; 6-Farben-Tarndruck | | Germany | Flecktarn | Universal | Special forces camouflage in use in the special forces of the German military. This pattern was developed with the aim to make it the new standard and universal pattern of the German Army., but has not yet entered service in the general troops. The pattern was developed by the Bundeswehr Research Institute for Materials and Operating Materials (WIWeB). It is a universal pattern that was unveiled in 2016. The aim and the colour scheme are comparable to the universal MultiCam pattern. 6 colours are used. In July 2025, the German military announced that the Multitarn would replace the Flecktarn (5-Farben-Tarndruck) in 2028-29 as the future standard camo. |
| Schneetarn | | Germany | Flecktarn | Winter / snow camo | Used by forces trained for these conditions. |

=== Protection equipment ===
| Model | Image | Origin | Type | Quantity | Notes |
Helmets
| Gefechtshelm M92 | | Germany; Spain | Combat Helmet | 328,000 | Standard issue helmet, being replaced by two helmets: Batlskin Viper (interim heavy combat helmet); Hexonia, up to 1.4 million helmets to be ordered (minimum ~ 700,000), selected in June 2026; This helmet entered in service in 1992 with the German military. It gets covered by a cloth with the Flecktarn camouflage. |
| Batlskin Viper; Gefechtshelm Streitkräfte | – | Canada; Germany | Combat Helmet | 34,000 (by end 2022) | Interim heavy combat helmet. Although it was initially selected as an interim helmet in 2021 for the special forces and for deployed troops, the German Army decided to make it the interim helmet after the 2022 invasion of Ukraine. Orders (328,008): 2021, framework agreement for up to 20,000 helmets, 15,008 of which were ordered in the end.; 2023, 313,000 ordered (205,000 to be delivered by 2025) The contract was passed with Galvion and Rheinmetall Soldier Electronics. |
| Trivium head protection system - special forces helmet Helmsystems Spezialkräfte | – | Germany | Combat Helmet | – | New helmet for the special forces, currently entering service. The helmet selected has a Multitarn cover, it is based on the Trivium helmet, and is the super high cut variant. Contract signed in August 2022 with Hexonia GmbH (German company part of the Norwegian NFM Group). |
Body armour
| Mehler Vario System MOBAST; Modulare Ballistische Schutz- und Trageausstattung | | Germany | Armoured vest and clothing system | 200,000 (delivered as of December 2024) | Standard armoured vest. A first procurement for 16,000 was made with all delivered in 2021, a total of 305,000 vests is expected.: Class 1 - soft ballistic protection (such as 9×19mm); Class 4 - hard-core ballistic protection (such as 7.62×51mm); K2 - stab protection against blades; Splinter protection for the shoulder, neck, upper arms, abdomen and thighs |
NBRC equipment
| Soldier NBC protection: Dräger M2000; Clothing | | Germany | Gas mask and NBC clothing | – | Standard gas mask in service, with additional purchases since 2021. |
EOD protection
| Med-Eng EOD 9 Schutzanzug EOD 9 | | Canada | Bomb disposal suit and helmet ensemble | – | Equipment used with the TPz Fuchs 1A8A5 FüFu EOD. |

=== Sniper equipment ===
| Model | Image | Origin | Type | Notes |
|---|---|---|---|---|
| Sniper kits | (Illustration) | Germany | Sniper equipment | Framework agreement signed with Scharrer Konfektions GmbH in September 2025, and valid until 2031. The kit includes a long list of equipment that adapts to all circumstances (clothing, climbing gear, camouflage nets + tarpaulin, eating gear, electronic equipment, waterproof equipment, parachute packing, tape, tools, bags). |

=== Electronic equipment ===
The Infanterist der Zukunft (IdZ) program aims to equip individual German infantry soldiers with an array of protective gear and small arms attachments, navigation, optics, optronics, and communications devices. These devices are networked to enable electronic (radio) communications between individual actors (soldiers, vehicles) and tactical units (platoons, companies) in the battlefield. Germany has ordered 353 platoon systems, meaning about 12000 individual sets, of IdZ-ES (ES Enhanced System) from Rheinmetall electronics.

| Model | Image | Origin | Type | Quantity | Notes |
Communications equipment
| Rheinmetall SmG; Sprechsatz mit Gehörschutz | – | Germany | Tactical communications sets with hearing protection | 110,000 (+ 81,000 in option) | Framework agreement for up to 191,000 sets of intercom with hearing protection function for €400 million (€140 million for the first 60,000 sets). Orders: 60,000 ordered in April 2024 (44,000 are infantry SMG, and 16,000 are command SMG), (delivered in 2024-25).; 50,000 additional approved in December 2025 (33,000 for the infantry, 17,000 for command). It also includes 10,000 connection cable sets, 50,000 CT WirelessPTT.; Made of: 3M Peltor with the ComTac VIII headset and CeoTronics AG with CT-Multi PTT 1C and 3C. |
Laser target designators
| Elbit Rattler XR | – | Israel; Germany | Target designator | 66 | Entered service in 2024. Further approved for order in September 2026. This complementary order might increase the quantity to close to 400 systems. |
Optics
| Safran Vectronics JIM Compact™ | | Switzerland | Multifunction IR goggles (laser range finder, laser pointer, GPS, inclinometers) | > 1,000 on order | First delivery in 2025. |
| Safran Vectronics Jim LR | | Switzerland | Long-range multifunction binocular | – | |
Electronic accessories
| MIKRON-D | | Greece; Germany | Night vision goggle (residual light amplifier tubes and an integrated IR illuminator using white phosphorus) | 66,041 sets of NVG (10,212 headwear) | Part of the IdZ program.: 5,000 ordered in June 2021 manufactured by Theon Sensors SA.; 20'000 ordered in July 2022, delivery ongoing until the end of 2024, manufactured in Germany by a joint venture made of Theon Sensors SA and Hensoldt Optronics GmbH.; 16,041 ordered in April 2024, to be delivered by the end of 2026.; 25,000 additional ordered in December 2024; 100,000 ordered in December 2025 |
| L3Harris GPNVG; Ground Panoramic Night Vision Goggle (or Quad eyes) | | United States | Night vision goggle (3rd gen - residual light amplification and thermography) | ~ 500 | IEA Mil-Optics GmbH received a contract in 2019 to supply the German special forces, the KSK, with this 3rd generation night vision goggles. |
| AIM HuntIR; WBG-HaWa-Inf | – | Germany | Thermal sight (cooled thermal imager with telescopic lens) | – | Supplied by Diehl BGT Defence (formerly "AIM Infrarot-Module"). |
| IRV 600 A1 | – | Germany | Thermal sight | – | Thermal sight attachment provided by Hensoldt, as part of the IdZ program. |
| IRV 900 A2 | – | Germany | Thermal sight | – | Thermal sight attachment provided by Hensoldt. |
| Hensoldt ZO 4×30i | | Germany | Intermediate range targeting optic | – | Can be combined with NSV 600, 4 times magnifier. |
| Hensoldt Zeiss NSV 80 | | Germany | Thermal sight | – | |
| Hensoldt NSV 600 | – | Germany | Thermal sight | – | Night sight attachment provided by Hensoldt, as part of the IdZ program. |
| Zeiss RSA reflex sight | | Germany | Red dot sight | – | Short range collimator sight for close quarters combat, as part of the IdZ program. Used with the G27P. |
| LLM-VarioRay | | Germany | Laser sight / tactical light | > 350,000 | Laser / light module accessory attached to weapons, supplied by Rheinmetall Soldier Electronics GmbH. The order for 130,000 is from 2021, and it intends to equip the infantry and all dismounted fighting forces, it is part of the IdZ-ED program. In December 2025, the contract was amended to 250,000 LLM. In May 2026, a complementary order was made for > 100,000 LLM to be delivered by 2032. |

== Indirect fire ==
| Model | Image | Origin | Type | Quantity | Notes |
Canon artillery
| PzH 2000 A2; Panzerhaubitze 2000A2 | | Germany | SPH | 134 (+22 on order) | Germany received 185 PzH 2000 between 1998 and 2002. Some were sold: 16 was sold to Croatia, 21 was sold to Lithuania and 14 was transferred to Ukraine (2022). Prior to the transfer to Ukraine in 2022, 108 were in service, 40 in storage. Since then, the ones in storage are being restored. The combat performance upgrade for the 2000A1 self-propelled howitzer was introduced in 2002. The computer core was converted to Pentium III and the operating system to Windows 2000, and internal changes were made, such as replacing all control devices with models with membrane buttons. With the combat value upgrade to the A2 version, a SEA with 1.9 kW was installed on the left rear for operation in a covered position and operation of the newly equipped air conditioning system. As a result, the storage location for the tow rope was relocated and a new ventilation opening was installed at the rear of the tower. |
| PzH 2000 A4; Panzerhaubitze 2000A4 | | Germany | SPH | 1 (+21 to be delivered) | Orders: 10 PzH 2000 were ordered in March 2023; 12 in May 2023; The first new PzH 2000 was delivered to the German Army in October 2025. |
Multiple rocket launcher
| M270A1 MLRS; Mittleres Artilleriraketensystem II (MARS II) | | United States | MLRS | 33 | 38 were planned to remain in service as of 2014. 5 donated to Ukraine. The weapons used by Germany are the: DM72 AT2 (based on MLRS); GMLRS (M31, M31A1) |
Mortars
| M113 Panzermörser 120 mm M113 G3 EFT GE PzMrs 120 mm (NDV 2) | | United States; Germany; Finland | Mortar carrier | 48 | 48 mortar carriers in service as of 2017. The mortars are Tampella 120 Krh/40 built under licence by Rheinmetall. 60 mortar shells are stored within the vehicle. |
| Wiesel 2 lePzMrs; Leichter Panzermörser | | Germany; Finland | Aerotransportable mortar carrier | 8 | |
| M120 Mortar; Tampella 120 Krh/40 | | Finland | Heavy mortar | – | Tampella 120 Krh/40 transported by the Wolf, and deployed on a plate on ground. It uses a PERI-R16A1 panoramic periscope and a K12mA2 fixed collimator. |
| M120R1 Mortar | | Israel; Germany | Heavy mortar | – | Soltam K-6 under license from Rheinmetall. Purchased in the 2000s and replacing the M120. |
Ammunition
| DM702; SMArt 155 | | Germany | 155mm shells: anti armour; top attack; explosively formed penetrator (EFP) | – | 9,000 shells purchased, some have been used, and other transferred to Ukraine. Potential order possible, with a production restart with the intention to produce 10,000 (cost estimate €81,000 per shell). It entered service in 2000 with the Bundeswehr. The supplier is GIWS GmbH, a joint-venture of Rheinmetall and Diehl BGT Defence. Two submunitions will look for targets and hit them from the top with an EFP. |
| Vulcano 155 | – | Italy; Germany | 155mm shells: base-bleed; guided shell; programmable fuse | – | Developed by Leonardo and joined later by Diehl BGT Defence.: Vulcano 155 BER (base-bleed extended range), unguided shell with a 50 km range; Vulcano GLR guided long range, guided ammunition with a 70 km range. Inertial guidance at mid-flight that is correcting the arc. The terminal guidance can be selected between GPS coordinated, or GPS + terminal laser guided (higher precision). |
| MLRS M26 - AT2 | | Germany | Anti-tank mine scattered by multiple launch rocket system rocket | 227mm | 28 anti-tank mines per rocket, 38 km (24 mi) range. 262,080 AT2 mines as DM 1399 for laying by M270 MARS (procurement 1993 to 1995). |

== Vehicles ==
The current inventory of armoured vehicles, both serviceable and active, is likely to increase significantly due to the ongoing war in Ukraine after Russia's invasion. This caused a rethink of Germany's defence doctrine, which includes increased defence spending of at least 2% of GDP and an initial outlay of €100 billion on expanding, improving and updating defence equipment. The German government is to outline its defence doctrine in the coming months, but is likely to include formations of additional combat brigades as well as support elements.

=== Main battle tanks ===
| Model | Image | Origin | Type | Quantity | Notes |
|---|---|---|---|---|---|
| Leopard 2A5 KWS II | | Germany | MBT | 19 | The German army had up to 285 Leopard 2A5: Lot 1 (+225): 225 upgraded from standard Leopard 2A4.; Lot 2 (+60): 125 more Leopard 2A4s were planned to be upgraded to the 2A5. 60 upgrades were completed, but further advancements allowed the remaining 65 units to be upgraded directly to the 2A6.; Following that some were sold and upgraded: (-160) upgraded to the standard Leopard 2A6; (-105) sold to Poland in 2013 after Germany decided to limit its fleet to 225 tanks |
| Leopard 2A6 | | Germany | MBT | 68 | 225 Leopard 2 were upgraded to A6 standard: (+160) upgraded from Leopard 2A5; (+65) upgraded from Leopard 2A4; The German Army also purchased: (+18) coming from the Netherlands Army in 2015; Some of those were upgraded/transferred: (-70) upgraded to standard Leopard 2A6M; (-51) upgraded to standard Leopard 2A6 A3; (- 20) upgraded to the standard Leopard 2A7, which were again upgraded to standard Leopard 2A7V; (-16) upgraded to the standard Leopard 2A7V directly; (-18) transferred to Ukraine in 2023 (14 + 4) |
| Leopard 2A6 A3 | | Germany | MBT | 34 | Leopard 2A6 upgraded with new Peri R17A3 commander optronics.: (+51) in service as of 2019; (-17) removed from service in 2022 to be modified in Leopard 2A7 A1 (see in future equipment section) |
| Leopard 2A6M | | Germany | MBT | 20 | Leopard 2A6 with better anti-mine protection.: (+70) were modified from Leopard 2A6; (-50) later upgraded to standard Leopard 2A6 MA3 |
| Leopard 2A6 MA3 | | Germany | MBT | 50 | Leopard 2A6M upgraded with new Peri R17A3 commander optronics.: (+50) modified from standard Leopard 2A6M |
| Leopard 2A7V | | Germany | MBT | 104 | All delivered as of November 2023, made of: (+68) Leopard 2A4 from the industry; (+16) Leopard 2A6; (+20) Leopard 2A7 (the only that were at this standard, coming from Dutch Army) |
| Leopard 2A7 A1 | | Germany | MBT | 1 (+ 16 on order) | Ordered in November 2021. First tank delivered in October 2024. New variant equipped with Active Protection System Trophy. KNDS Deutschland manufactured 17 new chassis, Bundeswehr supplied 17 turrets of the Leopard 2A6A3 variant. |

=== Armoured fighting vehicles, armoured personnel carriers and reconnaissance vehicles ===
| Model | Image | Origin | Type | Quantity | Notes |
Tracked vehicles
| Schützenpanzer Puma / Puma S1 | Spz Puma Spz Puma S1: | Germany | IFV | 337 (active in 2022) (+ 250 on order) | The Puma is the successor of the Marder 1. Orders: 405 originally planned, reduced to 350 in July 2012, it entered service in June 2015, and all delivered by August 2021.; Funding approval for a second batch of 229 Puma in March 2022, but only 50 ordered in May 2023 (€1.087 billion), delivery to start in December 2025 to the S1 standard.; 200 ordered in December 2025, to be delivered starting in 2028.; Modernisations to S1 standard (337): Contract in 2018 to develop the S1 standard and upgrade 40 Puma (€500 million).; Contract in June 2021 to upgrade 154 Puma to the S1 standard (>€1 billion), and an option to upgrade 143 Puma.; Option confirmed in April 2023 for the upgrade of 143 Puma to the S1 standard (€770 million).; 13 driver training vehicles among the orders: 8 with the first order; 5 from the first batch that are not being modernised to the S1 standard and modified to become a DTV; Order of additional systems for the Puma: 53 engines ordered in December 2023 to ensure a capacity to rotate the engines for maintenance and high availability.; Reactive armour modules approved for purchase by the parliament in December 2024 |
| Schützenpanzer Puma / Puma S1 | | Germany | Driver training vehicle | 13 | |
| Spz Marder 1 | | West Germany | IFV | – | Quantity in service unclear. Variant in service: Marder 1A3 (IFV, 1989 variant); Marder 1A3 (IFV, artillery observer with TZG 90); 24 × Marder 1A4 (IFV command vehicle with SEM90/93 radio system); 74 × Marder 1A5 modernised from the 1A3 variant (IFV with add-on mine armour and stowage for the crew's equipment); 35 of which were brought to the Marder 1A5A1 standard (1A5 with add-on cooling, protection around rear hatch, SPECTUS system, CG-12 ECM), deployed in Afghanistan; Marder 1A3 DTV (driver training)In 2021, Germany signed a contract for an upgrade on 71 Marder 1A5, with new Liebherr engines, and Renk transmissions and the integration of the and MELLS ATGM replacing the MILAN ATGM. Germany supplied around 140 Marder 1A3 as of 2025, with contracts to deliver around 200 Marder 1A3 (in reserve, and bought back from other countries). |
| M113A3G | | United States | Multi-role armoured vehicle | Unclear | Variants in service: 48 mortar carriers remain operational (2017); 22 M113 G3 EFT GE A0 Artillery Computer Network Carriers with the ADLER command.; 6 M113 NDV 2 Driver Training Vehicles; 35 M113 G3 EFT GE A0 TrgFzg RATAC-S |
| Wiesel 1 A5 | Wiesel 1A5 MK20: Panzerabwehrzug Wiesel 1 MELLS: | West Germany; Germany | Tankette / Armoured weapons carrier (Waffenträger) | 211 | 180 Wiesel 1 were modernised for combat capabilities, and kits for 15 for driving training were supplied. 16 reconnaissance vehicles were kept in service as they were.: 120 Wiesel 1A5 MK equipped with the KUKA E6 II A1 turret armed with Rheinmetall Mk 20 Rh-202 20 mm autocannon; 60 for which the TOW missile was replaced by the MELLS ATGM; 16 reconnaissance variant; 15 driving training variants; In non-airborne infantry units, the Wiesel weapon carriers are to be replaced by the Boxer CRV. For the others, they should be replaced by 2030. |
| Wiesel 2 | | West Germany; Germany | Tankette | 83 | Variants: 33 ambulances (SanTrp); 20 ordered in September 2001; 13 ordered in December 2006; 32 command vehicles (bewBefSt); 8 Pioneer reconnaissance troop (PiErkTrp); 8 mortar carriers (lePzMrs); 1 platoon command (ZgTrp); 1 fire command (FltTrp) |
| BV 206S | APC: Command post: Ambulance: | Sweden; Germany | Tracked articulated vehicle | 189 | In service in the Bundeswehr, manufactured under licence by Rheinmetall. |
| BvS10 Mk2b | | Sweden; Germany | Tracked articulated vehicle | 1 (for trial) (+ 366 on order) | Programme CATV (Collaborative All-Terrain Vehicles) with the British Royal Marines and the Swedish Army. Orders: 140 in December 2022; 227 in March 2023; Deliveries: First model received in September 2025. |
Wheeled vehicles
| GTK Boxer CRV; Combar Reconnaissance Vehicle - schwerer Waffenträger Infanterie (sWaTrInf) | | Australia; Germany; Netherlands | Armoured weapons carrier | 1 (trial) (+ 122 on order) | Heavy weapon carrier selected with a Lance 2 turret. It replace the Wiesel weapon carrier (MK / TOW variants) for the Jägertruppe light infantry units. Declaration of cooperation signed with Australia in March 2023. It was ordered in March 2024. Deliveries: 1 delivered for trial in May 2024; 19 to be delivered in 2025; 103 from 2026 to 2030; The training started in September 2026. And the simulation-training center passed the factory acceptance test in September 2026. |
| GTK Boxer; Boxer A2 (drive module) | APC (256): Command Post (65): Ambulance (72 + 38 ordered): DTV (10 + 10 ordered): | Germany; Netherlands | AFV | 403 (+ 48 on order) | Among the purchases to replace the M113A3G and the TPz Fuchs. Main timeline: 272 ordered in December 2006: 125 APC; 65 Command post vehicles; 72 ambulance vehicles; 10 DTV; Total of 272 delivered between 2009 and 2016.; 131 APC ordered in December 2015. Delivered between 2016 and June 2021.; 48 ordered in November 2025: 38 ambulances; 10 DTV; option for 100 Boxer DTV + 150 ambulances; Mission modules status: APC: 256 as delivered; Command posts: 65 as delivered; Ambulance: 72 in service + 38 on order; 72 from the initial order, modernisation contract in November 2025.; 38 ordered in November 2025 to KNDS; DTV; 10 as delivered in initial ordered; 10 ordered in November 2025 to KNDS; Drive module variants: First order of 272 vehicles: delivered in the A0 and A1 standard, all modernised to the A2 by December 2025, the command vehicles by Rheinmetall, the other vehicles by KMW / KNDS Deutschland.; Second order of 131 vehicles in the A2 standard. |
| Patria 6×6 | | Finland; Germany | APC | 5 (+ 275 on order, 466 options) | In January 2025, the decision has been made, and the Patria 6×6 was selected. The German Armed Forces requested a binding offer to Patria for 300 vehicles. Orders: December 2025, 280 AFVs purchased in two contracts. These contracts include: Firm order for 280 vehicles; 10 APC (like the Swedish variant); 170 PiGrp (engineer group transport); 48 PzAufklGrp (armoured reconnaissance group transport); 52 Feuerleitfahrzeuge (fire control vehicle); Options for 466 vehicles; 54 PiGrp; 14 PzAufklGrp; 398 Feuerleitfahrzeuge; Deliveries: 5 in February 2026; Total planned: As of 2024, around 1,000 vehicles were planned in all variants. As of July 2025, the requirements were raised to 3,500. |
| TPz Fuchs 1 | | West Germany; Germany | APC | 825 | As of 2022, 825 TPz Fuchs 1, among which 272 Fuchs 1A8. |
| Fennek | | Germany; Netherlands | Armoured reconnaissance vehicle | 217 | Orders: January 2002, 202 ordered (+ 410 for the Netherlands in a common order); 178 LVB (reconnaissance configuration); 24 Fü-/ErkdFzg Pi (Pioneer Command and recon); November 2007, 10 JFST; September 2009, 10 JFST; Modernisations: July 2017, modernisation contract for 30 Fennek LVB, to be transformed into Fennek JFST 1A3+; 2024, modernisation contract for: 30 Fennek 1A2 LVB; 50 Fennek JFST to be upgraded between 2027 and 2029; 217 were in service in 2016. |
| Dingo 1 / 2 | | Germany | IMV, MRAP | 586 (+ 115 on order) | Considered a GFF 3 class vehicle. GFF designates protected utility and command vehicles (MRAP), with the classes 1-3 differing in payload and armour level. 636, before 50 transferred to Ukraine. 50 Dingo 2 A4.1 ordered in 2023, 65 ordered in December 2024. |
| Eagle IV | GFF 2: Ambulance: | Switzerland; Germany | IMV, MRAP | 495 | 453 armoured Command and Operations Vehicle (GFF2), (25 urgently + 173, 60 and 195). 42 ambulance version ordered in 2009 (20) and 2011 (22). |
| Eagle V | | Switzerland; Germany | IMV, MRAP | 176 (+ 2,610 on order) (+ 1,390 in option) | Ordered in 2013 in "Armored Command and Operations Vehicle" (GFF2) variant. 2,610 ordered in December 2025, framework agreement for up to 4,000 vehicles (to be used by: Army, Air Force, Navy, Cyber and Information Domain Service). |
| Rheinmetall YAK | Transport: BAT (Beweglicher Arzttrupp) | Switzerland; Germany | IMV, MRAP | 145 | Procurement in 2004 of the DURO III, and additional purchase of the YAK, an improved version of the DURO, manufactured in Germany. Intended to be used the participation in the ISAF.: 4 Feldjäger (MP); 4 Luna UAV launcher / receptor; 31 EOD (explosive ordnance disposal); 10 Variant 1 (since 2004); 21 Variant 2 (since 2006); 100 transport vehicles (tactical transport, electronic warfare, etc.); 31 BAT; 12 Variant 1 (since 2004); 19 Variant 2 (since 2008) |
| Enok | Enok 5.4: Enok 6.1: | Germany; Austria | Armoured car | 221 | GFF 1 class. Mainly used by special forces (KSK) and the military police (Feldjäger). Manufactured by Magna Steyr in Graz.: 137 ordered in 2008; 84 ordered in 2015 |
| Wolf SSA | | Germany; Austria | Armoured car | 200 | Armoured variants used by among others the Feldjäger and for patrol and transport. Based on the civilian Mercedes G270 CDI with protections against mines and against light weapons. |
| ESK Mungo | | Germany | NBC vehicle | > 400 | Mainly used by airborne forces, GFF 1. |

=== Special forces vehicles ===
| Model | Image | Origin | Type | Quantity | Notes |
Utility vehicles
| Rheinmetall Caracal | | Austria Germany Netherlands | Paratroopers utility vehicle | ~ 4 (+ ~ 1,000 on order) | Order in common with the Dutch Army for 1,508 vehicles for a total of €870 million. An additional order for 1,050 vehicles for the German Army is expected eventually. Among those, 1004 Caracal are for the German Army (Luftlandebrigade 1, Gebirgsjägerbrigade 23 and the KSK). The first delivery took place in October 2026. |
| AGF Serval | | Germany; Austria | Light utility vehicle | 21 | Used by special forces. To be replaced by up to 80 AGF 2. |
| Polaris MRZR-D4 | | United States | Air mobile utility terrain vehicle | 65 | First batch of 65 vehicles. A framework agreement for a total of up to 148 vehicles. Version of the Polaris MRZR-D4, known as the Leichtes luftlandefähiges Utility Terrain Vehicle in the German Armed Forces. |
All-terrain vehicles
| Yamaha Grizzly 450 EPS | | Japan | ATV | – | |

=== Utility vehicles and unarmoured personnel carriers ===
| Model | Image | Origin | Type | Quantity | Notes |
Tracked vehicles
| BV 206D | | Sweden | Tracked articulated vehicle | 168 | Operated by the mountain infantry and German airborne troops. 168 delivered from 1985 to 2000. |
Utility vehicles
| Wolf; Mercedes-Benz 250 GD | | West Germany; Germany; Austria | Utility vehicle | – | Main utility vehicle in operation with the Bundeswehr. 11,000 in this variant had been supplied since 1989, it is being phased out and replaced by ip to 5,800 modern G-class vehicles. |
| Wolf II; Mercedes-Benz G280 CDI Greenliner (W461) | | Germany; Austria | Utility vehicle | – | In service since 2007. Variants: passenger transport, communications, lead convoi vehicle, military police. |
| Wolf III; Mercedes G300 CDI Greenliner | | Germany; Austria | Utility vehicle | 700 | 700 ordered in February 2020, delivered from the same year. Manufactured by Magna Steyr in Graz. Militarized by Knappe Service, including brackets for weapons and equipment, camouflage lighting, anti-glare protection, and the radio Fu 2 installation kit. |
| Stier; Nissan Pathfinder (3rd gen - R51) | | Japan | Utility vehicle | 1,043 | Nissan purchased in 2009, vehicle used by the Feldjäger and other German units. |
| Nissan Navara (2nd gen - D40) | | Japan | Utility vehicle | 1,043 | Nissan purchased in 2009, vehicle used by the Feldjäger and other German units. |
| Nissan Patrol (5th gen - Y61) Feldjägerausführung | | Japan | Utility vehicle | 1,043 | Nissan purchased in 2009, vehicle used by the Feldjäger and other German units. |
| Elch Toyota Hilux (8th gen, D-4D cab) | | Japan | Utility vehicle | – | Owned by BwFuhrparkService GmbH which supplies the Bundeswehr. Several variants, including military police, unmarked for special forces, for VIP transport. |
| Hirsch; Hirsch; Toyota Land Cruiser (D-4D Icon) | | Japan | Utility vehicle | – | Owned by BwFuhrparkService GmbH which supplies the Bundeswehr. Several variants, including military police, unmarked for special forces, for embassy and VIP transport. |
| Mercedes-Benz Vito (2nd gen W639 - 2010) | | Germany | Utility vehicle | – | Vehicle used by the Feldjäger. |
| Mercedes-Benz Vito (3rd gen W447) | – | Germany | Utility vehicle | – | Procured through BW-Fuhrparkservice. |
| Widder - VW T5 4-motion | | Germany | Utility van | ~ 200 | VW T5 4-Motion for the military police. |
| Widder; VW T6 4-motion | | Germany | Utility van | 530 to 1,150 | 530 ordered initially, up to 1,150 ordered in total.: 130 VW T6 multi-role; 400 VW T6 FISH Widder (Führungs- und Informationssystem Heer) |
Motorcycles
| BMW G 650 GS | | Germany | Motorcycle | – | |
| BMW F 850 GS | | Germany | Motorcycle | – | Being replaced by the Yamaha Ténéré 700. |
| Yamaha XTZ 700 Ténéré | | Germany | Motorcycle | 38 (260 on order in total) | Succeeding to the BMW F 850 GS. 38 delivered in February 2025. |
| BMW R 1150 RT | (Illustration) | Germany | Motorcycle | – | Used by the military police for escorts. |
| BMW R 1200 RT | | Germany | Motorcycle | – | |
| KTM 400 LS-E Military | | Austria | Motorcycle | – | |
All-terrain vehicles
| ATV Polaris MV 850 | – | – | ATV with rubber tracks | – | Based on a quad, with rubber tracks for snow conditions. Used to transport ammunition and personnel to a specific location in difficult terrain or to transmit important information if it cannot be transmitted by radio. |

== Logistics ==
=== Vehicle transport ===
| Model | Image | Origin | Type | Quantity | Notes |
|---|---|---|---|---|---|
| SLT 50-3 Elefant Schwerlasttransporter Elefant | | West Germany | Tank transporter | 324 | The SLT 50-3 is the only standard still active with the army. The modernization from 1994 to 2000 intended to enable the use of the trailer of the SLT-56 and have the capacity to transport the Leopard 2A4. |
| SLT 56 Franziska Schwerlasttransporter Franziska | | Germany | Tank transporter | 49 | Purchased in 1989, initial capacity 56 tons, truck and trailer modified to enable the transport of the Leopard 2A5 and A6. |
| SLT Mammut; Schwerlasttransporter Mammut | | Germany | Tank transporter, armoured cabin | 19 | The Leopard 2A7V required a higher capability tank transporter.: 19 delivered 2012 - 2013 |
| Rheinmetall HX81 tractor / Elefant 2 Sattelzugmaschine (SaZgM) | | Germany | Tank transporter, unprotected cabin | 137 (+ 56 on order) | Framework for 137 vehicles signed in 2018. Need for higher capacity (70 t) to transport the Leopard 2A7V.: 32 ordered in 2018; 48 ordered in November 2020; 57 ordered in May 2023.; 56 ordered in July 2026, after approval from parliament |
| DOLL tera S8P-052 Spider Sattelanhänger 70 tons (SaAnh 70t mil) | | Germany | Tank transport semi-trailer (road and off-road) | 122 (+ 168 on order) | Framework agreement signed in June 2022 between the BAAINBw and DOLL Fahrzeugbau GmbH for 249 semi-trailers. Complementary framework agreement approved in December 2025. They are designed to transport primarily the Leopard 2 A6M / A7V. Orders: Tranche 1, June 2022: 31; Tranche 2, 2023: 91; Tranche 3, December 2025: 168; Delivery: Tranche 1: between December 2022 and October 2023 |

=== Tactical logistic trucks ===
| Model | Image | Origin | Type | Quantity | Notes |
|---|---|---|---|---|---|
| Mercedes Unimog U3000, U4000 and U5000 | | Germany | Military truck | 5,500 | |
| Mercedes Zetros; GTF ZLK 5t, 4×4 | | Germany | Military truck | 110 | Protected transport vehicle (GTF). |
| MAN KAT1 | | West Germany | Military truck | 8,000 | Phased out in favour of UTF family of vehicles (RMMV HX2). |
| MULTI A1.1; 15t tmil gl MULTI A1.1 | | Germany | Tactical truck | 358 | Chassis: MAN SX 2000 32.403 VFAEG, 8×8. 358 procured in 1994, with an option for 452 additional vehicles that was not exercised. Procured in 1994, |
| Multi 2 A4 FSA 15t, milgl MULTI A4 FSA | | Germany | Armoured tactical truck | 157 | Chassis: RMMV SX45, 32.486 VFAEG, 8×8. 2 pre-serie MULTI 2 A3 FSA + 157 MULTI 2 A4 FSA ordered in December 2006, delivered between 2010 and 2012. The pre-serie trucks were tested with the KFOR prior to the order of the final variant A4. Equipment: Atlas Weyhausen AWL 172 T swap loading system; KMW 1530 RCWS (equipped with MG 3, M2 Browning or HK GMG); NBC protection; Rheinmetall ROSY (Rapid Obscuring System) |
| RMMV HX42M - UTF mil 6×6 Ungeschütztes Transportfahrzeug, ZLK 5t, HX42M 6×6 RMMV HX44M - UTF mil 8×8 Ungeschütztes Transportfahrzeug, ZLK 15t, HX44M 8×8 | 6×6: 8×8 | Austria; Germany | Unarmoured tactical truck | 3,271 1,987 6×6 1,284 8×8 | Successor of the MAN KAT1. The production took place at the plant in Vienna with mostly German parts for the RMMV HX2 family. This truck was ordered through two framework agreements: July 2017, 2,271 trucks for €900 million; January 2020, 1,000 trucks, for €389 million; Orders within the framework for the 6×6: Tranche 1, July 2017, 558; Tranche 2, May 2019, 252; Tranche 3, November 2019, 60; Tranche 4, January 2020, 675; Tranche 5, January 2021, 292; Tranche 6, January 2021, 150; Orders within the framework for the 8×8: Tranche 4, January 2020: 325; Tranche 5, January 2021, 109; Tranche 6, January 2021, 850; Deliveries: Initiated in 2018; 1,250 delivered by June 2020; 3000th delivered by May 2022; Last delivered by June 2023; Equipment: Can receive FLW 100 RCWS |
| RMMV HX-38.540 - MULTI 2 WLS UTF 8×8 (unarmoured) Wechselladersysteme Ungeschütztes Transportfahrzeug, ZLK 15t, 8×8 RMMV HX-41.540 - MULTI 2 WLS GTF 8×8 (armoured) Wechselladersysteme Geschütztes Transportfahrzeug, ZLK 15t, 8×8 | WLS UTF (unarmoured): WLS GTF (armoured): | Austria; Germany | Tactical truck with hydraulic hooklift hoist (for 20 ft ISO interfaces) | > 2,315 3,804 ordered (1,999 UTF + 1,815 GTF) | Successor of the MULTI A1.1 and the MAN KAT1. Framework agreement: June 2020, 4,000 swap body trucks for €2 billion valid until 2027; Truck orders: Tranche 1, June 2020, 540 trucks (310 UTF, 230 GTF); Tranche 2, June 2023, 367 trucks (203 UTF, 164 GTF); Tranche 3, June 2024, 1,515 trucks (265 UTF, 1,250 GTF); Tranche 4, November 2024, 200 trucks (180 UTF, 20 GTF); Tranche 5, approved in December 2024, ordered in January 2025, 219 trucks (98 UTF, 121 GTF); Tranche 6, ordered in August 2025, 963 trucks (933 UTF, 30 GTF); Platform orders:as of November 2024: 3,421 swap-loading platforms; 2,820 tarpaulin / bow superstructures; Additional platforms: August 2025: 400 swap-loading platforms; 1,000 tarpaulin / bow superstructures; Deliveries: May 2022, 1st truck; June 2023, > 600 trucks; June 2024: 1,008 trucks; 2,921 swap bodies and 2,320 tarpaulin and bow bodies; December 2024, > 2,315 (1,715 delivered in 2024 + at least 600 earlier); Equipment: HIAB hooklift Multilift MSH-165-CL; NBC protection; Rheinmetall ROSY smoke system; Can receive FLW 100 RCWS |
| RMMV HX40M - UTF mil 4×4 Ungeschütztes Transportfahrzeug, ZLK 3.5t, HX40M 4×4 RMMV HX42M - UTF mil 6×6 Ungeschütztes Transportfahrzeug, ZLK 5t, HX42M 6×6 RMMV HX44M - UTF mil 8×8 Ungeschütztes Transportfahrzeug, ZLK 15t, HX44M 8×8 | 4×4: 6×6: 8×8 | Austria; Germany | Unarmoured tactical truck | Unknown (+ 6,500 on order) | The production takes place at the plant in Vienna with mostly German parts for the RMMV HX2 family. Framework agreement for €3.5 billion for 6,500 trucks approved in June 2024. This framework includes 1,500 UTF mil 4×4, 1,000 UTF mil 6×6 and 4,000 UTF mil 6×6. Orders through framework agreement: July 2024, 610 for €313 million; December 2024, 349 trucks approved for purchase, ordered in January 2025 (164 UTF mil 6×6, 185 UTF mil 8×8); August 2025, 425 trucks ordered (UTF mil 4×4, UTF mil 8×8); May 2026, 2,000 trucks ordered (1,000 UTF mil 8×8, 1,000 UTF mil 6×6 and 4×4); Trucks to be equipped with command equipment, and capacity to easily install the RCWS FLW 100. |
| Iveco Trakker FSA GTF ZLK 15t | | Italy; Spain; Germany | Truck | 230 | Following decision in 2020 for a framework agreement for 1,048 vehicles, with a first firm order of 230 vehicles. For this framework, the cab will be made by KMW. |
| Iveco Trakker Strassentankwagen | | Italy; Germany | Armoured tank truck | 133 | 133 ordered in 2015 |
| TEP 90 Truppenentgiftungsplatz 90 | | Italy; Germany; France | CBRN defense + mobile decontamination system | 73 (+ 19 on order) | First order in 2006. Second order of 19 TEP 90 in 2025, with an option of 5 systems. The suppliers of the NBC system are: Kärcher Futuretech GmbH; NBC-Sys |

=== Civilian trucks operated by "BwFuhrparkService GmbH" ===
| Model | Image | Origin | Type | Quantity | Notes |
|---|---|---|---|---|---|
| Scania SLT 650; Schwer-lasttransporter | | Sweden | Tank transporter | 40 | The Scania XT650 S A8x6/4HA is the new heavy-duty transporter of the Bundeswehr from 2022: 70 tons capacity on the trailer (100 tons for the truck, trailer, and load), capable to transport the Leopard 2A7V; Scania Euro 6 engine, 8-cylinders, 16.0 liters, 650 hp; DOLL-panther semi-trailer S8E-0S2, 8 axles, 32 wheels, 7 steered axles |
| Scania R410; CA 6x4 MHA | | Sweden | Semi Truck - Military | 130 | In service since 2017 |
| Scania R450 B6×6HZ | (Illustration) | Sweden | Military Truck | 450 | |
| RMMV TGS; Abrollkipper, 8×4 | (Illustration) | Austria; Germany | Military Truck | 342 | In service since 2020 Hydraulic hooklift to transport platforms and containers. |
| RMMV TGS; 26.440 BL, 6×4 | (Illustration) | Austria; Germany | Medical container transport truck | – | |
| RMMV TGA; 18.360 BB, 4×4 | | Austria; Germany | Military truck | – | In service since 2007 |
| Iveco Eurocargo; ML 100 E 21W, 4×4, 2t | | Italy | Military truck | 47 | Ordered in 2006, in service since 2007. |
| Iveco Eurocargo ML 140 E 24W, 4×4, 5t | | Italy | Military truck | 180 | Ordered in 2006, in service since 2007. |
| Iveco Eurocargo; ML 150 E 28WS, 4×4, 5t | | Italy | Military truck | 280 | |
| Iveco Trakker; AT380T 45W 6×6, 15t | | Italy | Military truck | – | |
| Iveco S-Way; Strassentankwagen 8×4 hü MRG 20 | Illustration | Italy | Military tank truck | | 20 m^{3} |
| Iveco Trakker; AT 450 E6, 6x6, 15t | | Italy | Military truck | – | |
| Mercedes ATEGO (1018 A), 4×4 | – | Germany | Military truck | – | "hümS" "commercially available vehicle modified for military use" |
| Mercedes AXOR; 18.290, 4×4 | | Germany | Military truck | 1700 / 846 | In service since 2007. Standard swap body (developed by the company Sonntag Fahrzeugbau) |
| Mercedes Unimog 5000; 2t hümS gl | | Germany | Military truck | 650 | "hümS" "commercially available vehicle modified for military use" |

== Accessories for vehicles ==
=== Weapon stations ===
| Model | Image | Origin | Type | Calibre | Notes |
|---|---|---|---|---|---|
| KMW 1530 RCWS | | Germany | RCWS | 7.62×51mm NATO / 12.7×99mm NATO / 40×53HV mm | Installed on ATF Dingo 1 and Multi 2 A4 FSA and other trucks. Equipped with MG 3, M2 Browning, HK GMG. Updated variant equipped with MG 3, and MG5 in the future, and PERI Z17 optical targeting periscope and a thermal imaging device. |
| FLW 100 | | Germany | RCWS | 7.62×51mm NATO | Installed on Dingo, Mowag Eagle IV and V, and some other light vehicles. Some are equipped with HK MG5, others with Rheinmetall MG3. 230 ordered in 2008 total with FLW 200, over 1,000 delivered as of 2021. |
| FLW 200 | | Germany | RCWS | 12.7×99mm NATO / 40×53HV mm | Installed on Boxer, TPz Fuchs and some other vehicles. Equipped with a M2 Browning heavy machine gun or with a HK GMG A1 grenade launcher. 190 ordered in 2008, total with FLW 100, over 1,000 delivered as of 2021. |
| KUKA E6 II A1 | | Germany | Turret | 20×139 mm | 133 installed on Wiesel 1 AWC. Equipped with Rheinmetall Mk 20 RH-202 autocannon. |

=== Camouflage nets ===
| Model | Image | Origin | Type | Quantity | Notes |
|---|---|---|---|---|---|
| Camouflage nets (Sioen Industries NV) | (Illustration) | Belgium | Stationary multispectral camouflage | 0 (+ 219,261 on order) | 219,261 sets procured in January 2026. |
| Camouflage nets (Sioen Industries NV) | (Illustration) | Belgium | Stationary multispectral camouflage nets | 0 (+ 104,536 on order) | 104,536 × sets procured in January 2026. |

=== Logistics ===
==== Swap modules and containers ====
| Model | Image | Origin | Type | Quantity | Notes |
|---|---|---|---|---|---|
| GOFA TCK 9 | – | Germany | Fuel containers (4.650 litres) | 120 | |

== Engineering equipment ==
=== Recovery vehicles and cranes ===
| Model | Image | Origin | Type | Quantity | Notes |
Recovery vehicles
| BPz3 Büffel A0A2; Bergepanzer 3 | | Germany | ARV | 69 | Based on Leopard 2. |
| BPz3 Büffel A1 Bergepanzer 3 | | Germany | ARV | 6 | Based on Leopard 2. New battlefield recovery device at the rear and a universal transport platform above the engine compartment, and improved mine protection. |
| BPz3 Büffel A2 Bergepanzer 3 | – | Germany | ARV | 0 (+ 23 on order) | Based on the Leopard 2 chassis. 23 ordered in June 2026. |
| EH/W 200 Bison - Type 2 schweres geschütztes Berge- und Abschleppfahrzeug (sgeBAFz) | | Germany; Austria | ARV | 12 | Purchased in 2011 with the intention to use it in Afghanistan, the first of 12 systems was delivered and sent in Afghanistan in 2012. The Bison is based on the 8x8 Mercedes Actros 4151, able to recover vehicles like the Boxer, the Puma.: 1 "main" winch TR 200/6: 250 kN (25.5 tons), cable length of 100 m; 1 "self-recovery" winch Rotzler HZ 090: 100 kN (10.2 tons); 1 "auxiliary / pull-out" winch Rotzler HZ 010, 8 kN (0.8 tons); Crane HIAB 2222 ATF-1, lifting capacity of 6.6 tons, reach of up to 20.9 m, and a torque capacity of 205 kN·m (23.0 to·m); Towing fork, under-lift capacity 16 t; Protection level, STANAG IV |
Recovery vehicles and mobile crane
| Liebherr G-BKF Geschütztes Berge- und Kranfahrzeug | | Germany; Switzerland | Mobile crane and ARV | 33 | 33 Liebherr G-BKF (Geschutztes Bergekranfahrzeug) were ordered in 2017, deliveries 2017-2021. The vehicle has two winches: one towing lifting system and one telescopic boom.: 1 Winch TR 200: 200 kN (20.4 tons), cable length 75 m, rope speed 25 m/min; 1 Winch TR 80: 80 kN (8.15 tons), cable length 49 m, rope speed 27 m/min; Crane lifting capacity of 22.8 tons, maximum reach of 20.9 m, and 5 tons lifting capacity at maximum reach; Towing fork: capacity 40 tons; Protection level, STANAG 4569/AEP 55; It is intended to replace the FAUN BKF 35-4. |
| Tadano Faun BKF 35-4; Berge- und Kranfahrzeug 35-4 | – | Germany | Mobile crane and ARV | 2 | |
Mobile cranes
| Grove GMK 4080-3 | | Germany (Wilhelmshaven) | Mobile crane | 7 (5 additional for Navy) | 5 to be used by the German Navy, 7 to be used by the Joint Support Service. Specifications: 70 tons lifting capacity; boom length is 51 meters |
| Liebherr G-LTM 1090-4.2 Liebherr Teleskop-Mobilkrane | | Germany; Switzerland | Armoured Mobile crane | 38 | 38 Liebherr G-LTM were ordered in 2017, deliveries 2017-2021. 2 Crane types: 17 heavy-duty variants, counterweight of 8.4 tons, 2 tons lifting capacity at maximum reach; 21 very heavy-duty variants, counterweight of 22.5 tons, 4.5 tons lifting capacity at maximum reach; Specifications: 1 Winch TR 80: 80 kN (8.15 tons); telescopic boom extend up to 35.7 m, 36.6 tons lift capacity; Protection level, STANAG 4569/AEP 55; Intended to be used mostly as a construction crane, to load / unload containers and to recover vehicles (upside down, stuck, damaged). |
| Liebherr FKL; Liebherr Fahrzeugkran leicht | | Germany; Switzerland | Mobile crane | 251 | In service since 1991, lifting capacity of 10t. 251 purchased in total, used by the Bundeswehr, Navy and the Luftwaffe. It is used in the depot, repair facilities and technical departments. |
| Liebherr FKM; Liebherr Fahrzeugkran mittel | | Germany | Mobile crane | 208 | In service since 1994, lifting capacity of 20t. 208 purchased in total, used by the Bundeswehr, Navy and the Luftwaffe. It is used in the depot, repair facilities and technical departments. |
| Tadano Faun FKS ATF 30-2L; Fahrzeugkran schwer, all-terrain Fahrzeugkran | (Illustration) | Germany | Mobile crane | 4 | In service since 2000, lifting capacity of 35t. Part of the KRK fleet (crisis response force). Mostly used by the pioneers and medical troops to set up field camps and field hospitals. |
| Tadano Faun FKS ATF 70-4; Fahrzeugkran schwer, all-terrain Fahrzeugkran | – | Germany | Mobile crane | 4 | In service since 2000, lifting capacity of 70t. Part of the KRK fleet (crisis response force). Mostly used by the pioneers and medical troops to set up field camps and field hospitals. |
| Tadano Faun FKS ATF 100-5; Fahrzeugkran schwer, all-terrain Fahrzeugkran | | Germany | Mobile crane | 4 | In service since 2000, lifting capacity of 110t. Part of the KRK fleet (crisis response force). Mostly used by the pioneers and medical troops to set up field camps and field hospitals. |
| Tadano Faun FKS ATF 110-5; Fahrzeugkran schwer, all-terrain Fahrzeugkran | – | Germany | Mobile crane | 5 | In service since 2000, lifting capacity of 110t. Part of the KRK fleet (crisis response force). Mostly used by the pioneers and medical troops to set up field camps and field hospitals. |
| Tadano Faun FKS ATF 120-5 "Obelix" Fahrzeugkran schwer, all-terrain Fahrzeugkran | | Germany | Mobile crane | 5 | In service since 1999, lifting capacity of 130t. Part of the KRK fleet (crisis response force). Mostly used by the pioneers and medical troops to set up field camps and field hospitals. |

=== Combat engineering equipment ===
| Model | Image | Origin | Type | Quantity | Notes |
|---|---|---|---|---|---|
| PiPz 2A1 Dachs Pionierpanzer 2A1 Dachs | | West Germany | AEV | 83 | Based on Leopard 1 chassis. Project to part-replace ongoing. |
| PiPz 3 Kodiak Pionierpanzer 3 Kodiak | | Switzerland; Germany | AEV and mine-clearing vehicle | 44 | Replacing the Dachs. |
| Keiler | | West Germany | Mine-clearing vehicle | 24 | |
| Biber | | West Germany | AVLB | 40 | |
| Leguan; Gefechtsfeldbrücke Leguan (GFB Leguan) | | Germany | AVLB | 7 | It will eventually replace the fleet of Biber AVLB.: 7 ordered in 2016 delivered from 2018 to 2021; 24 ordered in 2020, to be delivered between 2023 until 2028 |
| M3 Amphibious Rig; Schwimmschnellbrücke Amphibie | | Germany | Amphibious float bridges | 30 | |
| MAMBA | – | Germany | Ultra lightweight footbridge | – | |
| Faltstraße | | West Germany | Trackway / carpet layer | 148 | System designed by KMW, 1 prototype in 1985, and 147 ordered in 1988. Based on the MAN SX200 (Lkw 15 t mil gl).: Load capacity - MLC70; carpet length - 50 m; carpet width - 4.2 m |
| Motorboot 3 | | Germany | Pioneer utility boat | – | Used as a tool to potentially build temporary bridges, or to ferry pioneer troops across rivers in their mission |
| Minenverlegesystem 85 | | Germany | Mine layer | – | |

=== Construction and handling equipment ===
| Model | Image | Origin | Type | Quantity | Notes |
|---|---|---|---|---|---|
| PALFINGER Crayler Feldladegerät FLG 140 1,3t (4×4) | | Germany | Crayler | – | Field forklift which is air-transportable, all-wheel drive and remote-controlled with high off-road mobility. It usually goes with the truck to unload where there is no specific handling equipment. |
| Steinbock 2,5 Y4 Feldumschlaggerät FUG 2,5t | | Germany | Forklift | 577 | In use in all branches of the German military, entered service in 1983, the remaining number in service is unknown. Capacity of 2.5 tons. |
| Hyster H16XD9 | | United States | Heavy forklift | – | |
| Manitou MHT 950L; Feldumschlaggerät FUG 4t (4×4) | | France | Telescopic handler | – | Unloading containers and preparing palets. |
| Merlo TF 45.11 T-170 | | Italy | Telescopic handler | – | Capacity 4.5 tons. |
| HERBST-SMAG Orion V | | Germany | Reach stacker | 18 | In service since 2014, capacity of 24 tons, can stack up 3 containers height. |
| Konecranes SMV 2216 TC3 | – | Germany | Reach stacker | 39 | Purchased in 2020, 26 tons capability, and can stack up 3 containers height |
| Hyster RS46-33CH | – | United States | Reach stacker | 9 | Selected in October 2020 for heavy needs. Capacity to lift 46 tons, and to stack up 5 containers. |
| Ahlmann AS1600 | (Illustration) | Netherlands | Wheel loader | – | 4,12 t capacity |
| Liebherr 574 | | Germany | Wheel loader | – | 4.5 m^{3} bucket. |
| CAT 953; Laderaupe | | United States | Track loader | – | |
| CAT 316F; Zeppelin | | United States | Excavator | – | |
| JCB HMEE Loader; Hochmobiler Geschützter Baggerlader | | United States | Armoured backhoe loader | 7 | Purchased in 2013. |
| Menzi Muck M545x; Laderaupe | | Switzerland | Walking excavator | 2 | Ordered in 2019, delivered in 2020, to be used by the Mountain Pioneer Battalion 8 from Ingolstadt |

=== Demining, route clearance and explosive ordinance disposal ===
| Model | Image | Origin | Type | Quantity | Notes |
Vehicles
| Fuchs 1A8 KAI Kampfmittelaufklärung | – | Germany | EOD vehicle | 5 | Developed by Rheinmetall in 2012. Equipped with a high-precision multi-jointed manipulator (10 m range) |
| Rheinmetall YAK - EOD Explosive ordinance disposal | – | Germany | EOD vehicle | 31 | 31 in service: 10 Variant 1 (since 2004); 21 Variant 2 (since 2006) |
Robots
| Rheinmetall RCSys; DEU Route Clearance Systeme | – | Germany; Switzerland | Route clearance, demining system | 11 | 7 packages ordered in 2011, 4 additional in 2019. A RC SYS is composed of: 1 Fuchs 1A8 for the crew; 1 RC Wiesel 1 AFM with detection sensors; 1 RC Mini-Minewolf remote-controlled demining machine; 1 Lkw MULTI FSA transport truck |
| MEOD; Manipulationsfahrzeug tEODor | | Germany | Unmanned ground vehicle, EOD robot | 10 | Aerovironment (formerly Telerob GmbH); Transported by the Rheinmetall YAK |
| Rabe; Roboter zur Aufklärung, Beobachtung und Erkundung im Ortsbereich | | United States; Germany | Unmanned ground vehicle, reconnaissance and exploration | 44 | Modified IRobot 110 Firstlook with additional reconnaissance equipment |

=== Specialised construction systems ===
| Model | Image | Origin | Type | Quantity | Notes |
|---|---|---|---|---|---|
| Leonardo container kits for network construction Netzservicetrupp (NServTrp) | – | Italy | Container with cabling systems to equip command posts | 4 (+ 39 on order) | Order in 2022, first delivery in March 2023. The kit enable the construction of command posts quickly. |

== Specialised equipment (including on vehicles) ==
=== Communications ===
| Model | Image | Origin | Type | Quantity | Notes |
Communication systems
| SATCOM | | Germany | Ground station for satellite communications system | – | |
| SATCOMBw | | Germany | Ground station for satellite communications system | – | Stage 2 currently in service and since 2011, two military satellites by Airbus Defence and Space covering an area in from the Americas to Eastern Asia. |
| Tetrapol; Bündelfunksystem TETRAPOL Bw | | Germany | Digital trunked radio system | – | Stage 2 currently in service and since 2011, two military satellites by Airbus Defence and Space covering an area in from the Americas to Eastern Asia. |
| TÜtrSys Terrestrisches Übertragungssystem | | Germany | Terrestrial radio relay | – | Tower antenna to be deployed. The Terrestrial Transmission System is a long range communication tool. It enables communication between the network nodes of the Bundeswehr. Key element in a network-centric warfare modern doctrine. 2 variants: on a trailer; on a 6×6 MAN gl truck; Accompanied by a communication truck module. |
| RUAG miFAP; Multinational interoperabler Funkanschaltpunkt | – | Switzerland | Communication node (container based) | 55 (+ 14 on order) | It is based on BTuLB containers (Betriebs-, Transport- und Lagerbehältern), and is shielded against high frequency radiations. Communications hub and universal voice and IP router that interoperably connects transmission networks and devices from different manufacturers and generations. Equipment: TAN-T230A (interface for 6 analogue radio devices, 10 digital devices/networks); 4 telescopic masts for antennas with pre-wired connections; Integrated generator for independent operation; A/C |
| RS NServTrp; Rüstsätzen Netzservicetrupp | – | Germany; Switzerland | Container with network cable and connection kits | 43 (+76 on order; + 274 in option) | Supplied by Leonardo Deutschland and Solifos. Orders: 43 RS NServTrp in 2023 for the German VJTF; Budget approval for framework over 7 years for up to 350 RS NServTrp in December 2024 (€113.2 million). Firm orders: 76 in March 2025 for €22.8 million. |

=== Radar ===
| Model | Image | Origin | Type | Quantity | Notes |
|---|---|---|---|---|---|
| COBRA; Artillerieortungsradar Cobra (CO abbr>unter Battery RAdar) | | Germany; France; United Kingdom | Counter-battery radar | 12 | Based on the 8×8 Rheinmetall HX platform. 1 CoBRA was transferred to the Ukrainian Armed Forces. |
| ABRA radar Artillerie - Beobachtungsradar | | Germany; France | Counter-battery and battlefield surveillance radar | 35 | A M113 A1 GE equipped with a French radar system, RATAC-S ("RAdar de Tir pour L`Artillerie de Campagne"). This variant is from the 1990s, it will be retired by 2027. Its successor is the system BARÜ. |
| PARA; Panzeraufklärungs M113 ABRA radar | | Germany; France | Surface reconnaissance, Pulse Doppler radar | – | Based on the Tpz Fuchs, and equipped with a RASIT radar. It will be retired by 2027. Its successor is the system BARÜ. |
| BOR-A 550 (Bodenüberwachung radargerät tragbar) | | France | Ground, Sea & Low Level Air Surveillance Radar, Pulse Doppler | – | LeGAR is a system made of the BOR-A-550, 2 VHF and 1 HF radio, installed in a Mercedes-Benz G290 TD "Wolf". It operates in the I-band. The systems are network-capable, so that several devices can be operated remotely from one workstation. |
| EL/M-2180 WatchGuard; Bodengebundenes Aufklärungs - und Raumüberwachung (BARÜ) | (Illustration) | Israel; Germany | Surface reconnaissance and space surveillance radar system | 69 | Light portable radar used as a surveillance of the battlefield system (ground, air, artillery). It was ordered in 2021, is being delivered (2022-24). It will replace: ABRA; BOR-A 550; PARA |
| Ground Alerter 10 (GA10) | – | Germany | C-RAM Ground Alerter System | 17 | 17 GA 10 supplied by October 2024. It is a portable and easily deployed system intended to serve as an early warning for incoming threatening artillery. The goal is to provide few seconds to the troops to go protect themselves wherever possible before the impact. It can also be used as a convoy protection system. |
| Thales Ground Observer 12 (GO12) | – | Germany | Short-range battlefield radar system | 60 | To be delivered 2026. |

=== Electronic warfare ===
| Model | Image | Origin | Type | Quantity | Notes |
|---|---|---|---|---|---|
| MoGeFa Mobile and Protected Signals Intelligence | – | Germany; Switzerland | Mobile SIGINT | – | Platform Rheinmetall Yak |
| Hummel | | Germany | Electronic warfare vehicle | – | Jam radio and comms |
| KWS RMB; TPz Fuchs Kampfwertsteigerung Radio Multiband | | Germany | Electronic warfare vehicle | – | SIGINT, it analyses the radar signal, locates them. It is part of the Cyber and Information Space organization ("Organisationsbereich Cyber- und Informationsraum"). Equipped with a 12m antenna mast. |
| EloKa "Peiler" | | Germany | Electronic warfare vehicle | – | The HF/VHF reconnaissance device is used for locating transmitters. The direction finder has a mast system that can be extended to twelve meters on the vehicle roof. New version allows also to locate radar signals origin |
| EloKa | | Germany | Electronic warfare vehicle | – | Jams HF, VHF, UHF and GSM signals, it is used as a protection against IED detonated by a receptor. TPz-1 A8A17 CG20+ |

== Emergency equipment ==
Note: some of the armoured vehicles are already mentioned above, but this section centralises all the equipment related to the emergency services of the Bundeswehr.

=== Ambulances and patient transport ===
| Model | Image | Origin | Type | Quantity | Notes |
Armoured military ambulances and patient transport
| Boxer - BAT - sgSanKfz; Boxer - Beweglicher Arzttrupp - schwer geschützte Sanitätskraftfahrzeug | | Germany; Netherlands | Armoured ambulance | 72 (+ 38) | Orders: 72 in 2006, as part of the first order of the GTK Boxer for 272 vehicles.; 38 in November 2025 ordered to KNDS as a subcontractor of ARTEC.; Modernisation: the first 72, modernised under a contract in November 2025 (new radio D-LBO + new medical equipment) for €117 million, delivery from 2027. |
| TPz Fuchs 1 A8 - BAT - sgSanKfz; Fuchs - Beweglicher Arzttrupp - schwer geschützte Sanitätskraftfahrzeug | | West Germany | Armoured ambulance | 37 | |
| Rheinmetalll YAK - BAT; YAK - Beweglicher Arzttrupp | | Switzerland; Germany | MRAP - armoured ambulance | 31 | BAT: 12 Variant 1 (since 2004); 19 Variant 2 (since 2008); Being replaced by the Eagle V 6x6 - mgSanKfz. |
| Eagle V 6x6 - mgSanKfz mittlere geschützte Sanitätskraftfahrzeuge | | Switzerland | MRAP - armoured ambulance | 1 (+ 79 from first order) (+ 360 on order) (+ 640 in option) | Programme "mittleres geschütztes Ambulanzfahrzeug", ordered in 2020, Successor to the YAK ambulances. Testing from May 2024, to enter service from November 2024 to end of 2025 although it was initially planned to be delivered from July 2023 to December 2024. First vehicle for training supplied in July 2025. Enables to provide emergency medical care to up to two patients requiring intensive care. Note: 77 for the German Army, 3 for the Navy. 360 ordered in December 2025, framework agreement for up to 640 vehicles (to be used by: Army, Air Force, Navy, Cyber and Information Domain Service). |
| Mowag Eagle IV - BAT - lgSanKfz Eagle IV - Beweglicher Arzttrupp - leicht geschützte Sanitätskraftfahrzeug | | Switzerland; Germany | MRAP - armoured ambulance | 42 | 42 ambulances (BAT): 20 ordered in 2009; 22 ordered in 2011 |
| Wiesel 2 - SAN; Wiesel 2 Sanitätstrupp | | West Germany; Germany | Tankette - armoured ambulance | 33 | 33 ambulances (SanTrp): 20 ordered in September 2001; 13 ordered in December 2006 |
| BV 206S | | Sweden; Germany | Tracked articulated vehicle - armoured ambulance | 31 | In service in the Bundeswehr, manufactured under licence by Rheinmetall. Variants: Sanitätstrupp; Beweglicher Arzttrupp |
| Protected Casualty Transport Container Geschützten Verwundeten-Transportcontainers (GVTC) | | Germany | Containers for protected patient transport | 1 (+ 12) | Up to 8 patients, 2 medical personnel, equipped with oxygen generation system in a 20 ft ISO armoured container. Made by Airbus Defence and Space, Drehtainer GmbH and Binz Automotive. Series system delivered 2024-2026 |
Military unarmoured ambulances, patient transport
| Iveco Eurocargo 4×4 UTV gl Ungeschützter Verwundetentransport geländegängig | | Germany; Italy | Off-road unprotected casualty transport | 294 (241 for the medical service, 41 for the Army, 6 for the Navy) | Framework agreement signed in July 2021 with Iveco Magirus AG for up to 500 UVT to replace: Unimog 2-tons Krankenkraftwagen (KrKw); Unimog 2-tons Beweglichen Arzttrupps (BAT); Orders: Tranche 1, 294 UVT, €244 million, delivery 2022 - 2027.; Manufacturer: Iveco Magirus AG produces in Germany the Iveco Eurocargo 4×4 MLL 150 E 28 WS, with a Euro VI engine 207 kW; EMPL produces the rear box body from BINZ Ambulance- und Umwelttechnik |
| Mercedes-Benz Unimog U1300L KrKw; Lkw 2 t Krankenkraftwagen | | Germany | Off-road unprotected casualty transport | – (1,824 were supplied) | Medical variant of the Unimog 1300L entered service in the Bundeswehr in 1984, 1,824 of those were produced. BINZ Ambulance- und Umwelttechnik supplied the medical container. Being replaced by the Iveco Eurocargo UTV. |
| Mercedes-Benz Unimog U1300L BAT; Lkw 2 t Beweglicher Arzttrupp | | Germany | Off-road mobile medical squad | – | Modified from Unimog U1300L KrKw. Being replaced by the Iveco Eurocargo UTV. |
Civilian ambulances and patient transport and emergency medical cars
| Iveco Eurocargo ITW; Intensivtransportwagen | | Italy | Intensive care transport truck | 6 | Capacity to transport 2 patients requiring intensive care. Manufacturers: Truck Iveco Eurocargo ML 120 E250; Intensive care module by Fahrtec Systeme |
| Iveco daily Rettungdienst | | Italy | Ambulance (civilian) | 1 | Used in Ulm, since 2021. Manufacturers: Van Iveco Daily VI 50C21; Medical module by Fahrtec Systeme |
| Iveco daily Rettungdienst | | Italy | Ambulance (civilian) | 1 | Koblenz ECMO-Transport: Manufacturers: Van Iveco Daily 35C21; Medical module by Magirus |
| Mercedes-Benz Sprinter; Rettungdienst | | Germany | Ambulance (civilian) | 2 | Ambulance used in Berlin, based on a Mercedes-Benz Sprinter 516 CDI chassis, and equipped by AMZ Kutno. |
| BMW X5; Notarzteinsatzfahrzeug (NEF) | | Germany | Emergency medical car (civilian) | – | Entered service in 2019. Manufacturers: BMW X5 xDrive 30d (F15); Modifications on the vehicle by Freytag Karosseriebau; Various supplies |

=== Firefighting equipment ===
| Model | Image | Origin | Type | Quantity | Notes |
Wildfire vehicles
| Rosenbauer TLF Waldbrand - Tatra Force T 815-7 4×4; Feuerlöschkraftfahrzeug Waldbrandbekämpfung (FlKfz Waldbrand-Bkg) | | Austria; Czech Republic | Wildfire engine | 76 | Trucks purchased through the BwFuhrparkService GmbH (BwFPS) in 2021, deliveries starting in 2023. Equipped with a 4.5 m^{3} water tank and 100 litres of foam agent. |
| Kässbohrer PistenBully 400W | | Germany | Tracked wildfire engine | 2 | 3 m^{3} water tank and a Ziegler centrifugal fire pump with a rapid intervention system. System based in Meppen. |
| Fendt 820 Vario | | Germany | Tractor | 2 | Wildfire support vehicle. It can track water tanks on the field, or tow the Pistenbully 400 on the field. System based in Meppen. |

== Animals ==
| Model | Image | Type | Notes |
|---|---|---|---|
| Mule | basic | Domesticated equine | Used by the 23rd Mountain Infantry Brigade (Gebirgsjägerbrigade 23) for logistical purposes. |
| Donkey | basic | Domesticated equine | Used by the 23rd Mountain Infantry Brigade (Gebirgsjägerbrigade 23) for logistical purposes. |
| Haflinger | basic | Domesticated equine | Used by the 23rd Mountain Infantry Brigade (Gebirgsjägerbrigade 23) for logistical purposes. |

== Army air defence ==
| Model | Image | Origin | Type | Quantity | Notes |
Anti-air missiles
| FIM-92K Stinger Block I Fliegerfaust 2 Stinger | | United States | MANPADS | – | In service with the German Army. Complementary order for 500 missiles in June 2024 for €395 million to be delivered in 2028-2029 to replace the ones supplied to Ukraine. |
Anti-drone systems
| Hensoldt ASUL | – | Germany | C-UAS | – | Operated since 2022, used as a base protection system against drones. Modernisation contract signed in 2025. It is made of radar systems, other sensors and a spectrum of effectors. |

== Unmanned aerial vehicles ==
=== Combat unmanned aerial vehicles ===
| Model | Image | Origin | Type | Role | Quantity | Notes |
|---|---|---|---|---|---|---|
| Argus Interception Capture | – | Germany | Mini multicopter unmanned aerial vehicle | Web-slinging interceptor drone | 24 (+ 136 on order) | 24 net launcher drones received in 2025, 136 additional by 2027. |

=== Intelligence unmanned aerial vehicles ===
| Model | Image | Origin | Type | Role | Quantity | Notes |
|---|---|---|---|---|---|---|
| EMT Luna X-2000 | | Germany | Fixed-wing UAV | ISTAR | 81 | Currently being replaced by LUNA NG. (in 2013, 81 usable, 52 losses). |
| EMT Luna NG/B | | Germany | Fixed-wing UAV | ISTAR | 20 | Replacing LUNA and KZO: 1st batch of 20 already in service; 45 additional ordered |
| Rheinmetall KZO | | Germany | Fixed-wing UAV | ISTAR | 43 | Currently being replaced by LUNA NG. |
| EMT Aladin | | Germany | Fixed-wing UAV | ISTAR | 290 | As of 2013, 290 were in service, and 30 were lost (22 destroyed, 8 missing). |
| Quantum Vector VTOL Fähigkeit des Abfangens von in gesperrte Lufträume eindringenden Kleinfluggeräten durch zivile Einsatzmittel (FALKE) | | Germany | Tiltrotor UAV | C-UAS (Intercepting UAV penetrating restricted airspace) | – | Synthetic Aperture Radar payload. Range: 30 km (19 mi). |
| Quantum Vector VTOL | | Germany | Tiltrotor UAV | ISTAR | 14 | 14 expected to arrive in service in the Bundeswehr in 2023. Developed for airport safety, air traffic safety, police use and military use. Additional orders approved in December 2025. |
| AirRobot AR 100-B | | Germany | Multicopter mini-UAV | ISR | 163 | |
| AirRobot AR 100-H | – | Germany | Multicopter mini-UAV | ISR | 145 | 145 ordered, to arrive from 2023. Dubbed MIKADO in German Army service. |
| AirRobot AR 200 | | Germany | Multicopter mini-UAV | ISR | – | |
| Black Hornet Nano | | Norway | Rotorcraft micro-UAV | ISR | 30 | Additional ordered in December 2024 (Black Hornet 3 type and the new Black Hornet 4). |
| DJI Phantom 4 | | China | Commercial multicopter mini-UAV | ISR / training | 30 | |
| DJI Matrice 200 | | China | Commercial multicopter mini-UAV | ISR / training | 60 | |

== German Army Aviation Corps ==
=== Command systems ===
| Model | Image | Origin | Type | Quantity | Notes |
|---|---|---|---|---|---|
| Hensoldt EUA NT Einsatzunterstützungsanlage Neue Technologien | – | Germany | Container with ground station platforms for helicopter operations command and support | – | Modernised variant of the EUA, contract with Hensoldt commissioned in May 2022. The system is operated from a container. |
| Hensoldt EUA Einsatzunterstützungsanlage | – | Germany | Container with ground station platforms for helicopter operations command and support | – | Being modernised. |
| Hensoldt EUA Optarion Einsatzunterstützungsanlage | – | Germany | Mission support system, and data link system | – | |

=== Helicopters ===
| Model | Image | Origin | Role | Quantity | Notes |
Combat helicopter
| Eurocopter EC665 Tiger UHT | | Germany; France; Spain | Attack helicopter | 51 | From the 68 delivered, 51 are in active service. Among the remaining 17 helicopters: 15 used as a spare parts reserve.; 2 were lost, one in Mali in July 2017 (74+29), one in Germany in March 2013(74+27). |
| Airbus H145M LKH; Leichter Kampfhubschrauber | | Germany | Multirole attack helicopter / training helicopter | 0 (+ 72 on order) | 72 H145M LKH ordered by the German Army, they are planned to be split the following way: 39 for an active combat role; 33 for a training / professionalisation role.Detail of the orders; 62 ordered with an option for 20 helicopters in December 2023.; 57 for the German Army; 5 for the KSK (under the German Air Force); 20 ordered in December 2025: 15 for the German Army; 5 for the KSK (under the German Air Force); The first delivery to the air force was made in 2026, with a first batch of two aircraft, none for the Army yet. |
Transport and utility helicopters
| NH90 TGEA; TTH German Army | | Germany; France; Italy; Netherlands | Utility helicopter | 40 | |
| NH90 TGEE; TTH German Enhanced | | Germany; France; Italy; Netherlands | Utility helicopter | 42 | Based on TGEA variant, with added systems: Emergency ditching system; 2 additional decoy magazines for the self-protection system (6 instead of 4); 5th multifunctional display |
| Airbus H145 LUH SAR; Light utility helicopter, search and rescue | | Germany | Search and rescue | 8 | The H145 LUH SAR replaced the UH-1 Iroquois in the same role. The deliveries took place from 2019 to 2021 |
Training aircraft
| Airbus H135; EC 135T1 variant | | Germany | Training helicopter | 14 | 14 in service since 2000. |
| Airbus H135 | | Germany | Training helicopter | 5 | Rented from Airbus and ADAC since 2018. To be replaced by the newly acquired H145M. |

=== Aircraft weapons ===
| Model | Image | Origin | Type | Used with | Quantity | Notes |
Missiles
| ATAS; Air-to-air Stinger | | United States | Air-to-air missile | EC665 Tiger UHT | – | Missile used with the EC665 Tiger, operated on 2-missile pods. |
| MBDA PARS 3LR; Panzerabwehr-Raketensystem der dritten Generation mit langer Reichweite | | Germany; France | ATGM; Anti-tank guided missile | EC665 Tiger UHT | 680 | Missile developed for the EC665 Tiger, operated on 4-missile pods. 680 missiles purchased by the German Army. Range: > 7 km (4.3 mi) |
| Euromissile HOT-3 | | France; Germany | ATGM; Anti-tank guided missile | EC665 Tiger UHT | – | Missile used with the EC665 Tiger, operated on 4-missile pods. |
Rockets
| FZ Rocket system FZ71, Fz181, FZ122, FZ149 | | Belgium; Germany | Unguided helicopter rocketa (70 mm) | EC665 Tiger UHT / H145M LKH | – | Rocket manufactured by Rheinmetall, in collaboration with Thales Belgium, Contract in 2022 for 7'620 rockets for €19.92 million. a a a Rocket pods: 7×70mm (FZ233/FZ220); 12×70mm (FZ231/FZ219); 19×70mm (FZ225/FZ207) |
Cannons and machine guns
| FN M3P Browning; Sch MG M3P | | Belgium | Gun pod (12.7×99mm NATO) | EC665 Tiger UHT | – | The pod contains 400 cartridges. |
| POD NC 621 | | France | Cannon pod (20×102 mm) | Airbus H145M LKH | – | |
| FN M3M Mk3 | | Belgium | Side-door machine gun (12.7×99mm NATO) | NH90 TTH | 50 | 50 machine guns ordered by the Bundeswehr for the NH90 in 2020, delivered in 2021-22. |
| Heckler & Koch 121; MG5A2 | | Germany | Side-door machine gun (7.62×51mm NATO) | NH90 TTH | – | |

== Equipment known to be in the operational reserve ==
| Model | Image | Origin | Type | Notes |
|---|---|---|---|---|
| Heckler & Koch P7 | | West Germany | Semi-automatic pistol | The P7 was only used for military personal protection by the Feldjäger. |
| Heckler & Koch G3A3/A4 | | West Germany | Battle rifle | Retired as a standard rifle, kept in strategic long-term storage. Most were brought to the G3A3 standard. |
| Heckler & Koch G3A3ZF | | Germany | DMR | It was used as an interim solution until the introduction of the G28. The selected G3s were converted to the G3A3ZF DMR version from 2008. |
| MILAN | | France; West Germany | ATGM | Replaced by MELLS (Spike LR) |
| Flakpanzer Gepard 1A2 | | West Germany; Germany | SPAAG | Some were taken out of storage and transferred to Ukraine. |

== See also ==
- German Army:
  - List of future equipment of the German Army
- German Air Force:
  - List of active equipment of the German Air Force
- German Navy:
  - List of active German Navy ships
  - List of active aircraft of the German Navy
  - List of active weapons of the German Navy
  - List of ship classes of the Bundesmarine and Deutsche Marine
  - List of ships of the German navies
  - Kommando Spezialkräfte Marine (German Navy special forces)
- German Army equipment pages in German:
  - List of small arms of the Bundeswehr
  - List of Bundeswehr ammunition
  - List of wheeled vehicles of the Bundeswehr
  - List of tracked vehicles of the Bundeswehr
  - List of aircraft of the Bundeswehr
