= Binz (disambiguation) =

Binz is a seaside resort on the German island of Rügen

Binz may also refer to:

- Binz (vehicles), a German coachbuilder and custom vehicle manufacturer
- Binz (song), a 2019 song by Solange
- BINZ (zoo), Nature Zoo on Belle Isle
- MV Binz, Kriegsmarine tanker
