= LIV (SO) Serval =

Light Infantry Vehicle for Special Operations LIV (SO) Serval
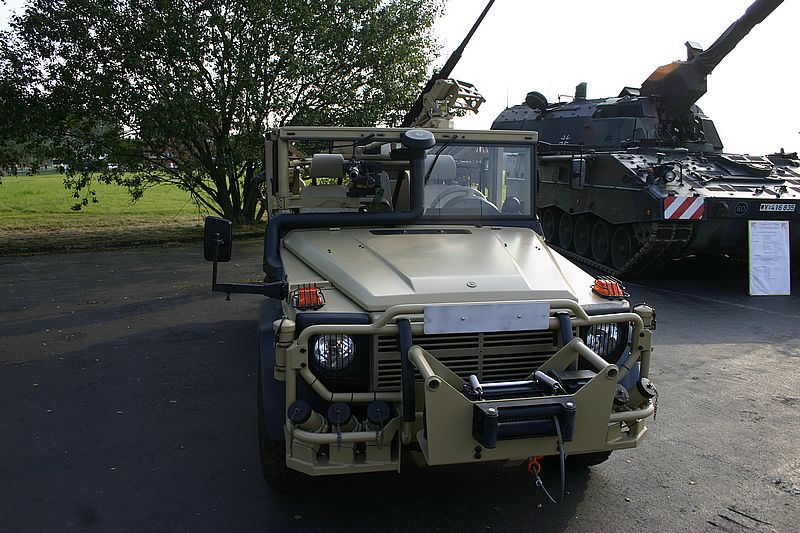
- German LIV (SO)
- Type: Light Utility Vehicle
- Place of origin: Germany

Service history
- In service: 2004–present
- Used by: Operators

Production history
- Manufacturer: Rheinmetall
- No. built: 21+

Specifications
- Mass: 3,500 kg (7,700 lb)
- Length: 5.64 m (222.0 in)
- Width: 2.50 m (98.4 in)
- Height: 2.30 m (90.6 in)
- Crew: 4
- Main armament: 1 × 40 mm HK GMG or .50 caliber M2 Browning heavy machine gun
- Secondary armament: 2× Rheinmetall MG3 7.62×51mm general purpose machine guns
- Engine: 2.685 litre, 5 cylinder diesel engine 156 hp (116 kW)
- Payload capacity: 1,200 kg (2,600 lb)
- Transmission: 5 speed automatic
- Fuel capacity: 150 L (33 imp gal; 40 US gal)
- Operational range: 830 km (520 mi)
- Maximum speed: 120 km/h (75 mph)

The Rheinmetall LandSysteme Light Infantry Vehicle for Special Operations, or LIV (SO), is a German light armoured utility vehicle based on the Mercedes-Benz G-Class. It is also known by the names Serval, Wolf, and AGF. The LIV (SO) is designed specifically for use by special operations forces, and has light armour, high mobility and high firepower. Development of the vehicle started in 2002, and 21 were procured by the German Army for the KSK special forces in 2004. An unspecified number of vehicles were delivered to the Swiss Army in 2007.

== Names ==
The name "Rheinmetall LandSysteme (RLS) Light Infantry Vehicle for Special Operations" is abbreviated as LIV (SO). It is also marketed under the names Wolf and Serval. The German name for the LIV (SO) is Aufklärungs- und Gefechtsfahrzeug, meaning "reconnaissance and combat vehicle". The vehicle is also marketed by the abbreviation of this name, AGF, without translation. The LIV (SO) is also referred to by a combination of these names, such as LIV (SO) Wolf, LIV (SO) Serval and Serval AGF.

== Development and operational history ==
Rheinmetall was awarded the contract for the LIV (SO) by Germany's Ministry of Defence in 2002. The vehicles were required on an immediate need basis, and Rheinmetall were given only 10 months to deliver the first example of the vehicle. The initial order was for 21 vehicles, all of which were delivered to German special forces units in 2004. The Swiss Army obtained several modified LIV(SO)s in 2007. The LIV (SO) was also considered for purchase by Lithuania in 2005, although the final contract was given to Land Rover.

In March 2019, the German Army filed an official request for a replacement of the Serval. Up to 80 vehicles in a 2-class configuration are planned.

== Features and characteristics ==
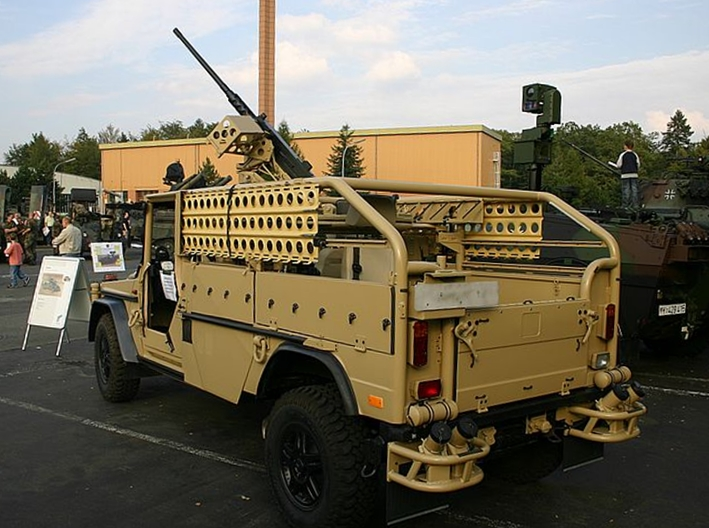
A LIV (SO) equipped with a heavy machine gun.

The LIV (SO) is developed on the chassis and running gear of the 270 CDI model of the Mercedes-Benz G-Class. However, the gross vehicle weight rating and wheelbase of the LIV (SO) are both higher than that of the normal G-Class. The Mercedes-Benz developed chassis, complete with the engine compartments, is fitted with rear compartment and frame to complete the vehicle, which are designed by Rheinmetall developed by Binz GmbH & Co. The frame provides roll-over protection. The LIV (SO) is four-wheel driven, and is powered by a 2,685 cc (163.8 cu in) 5-cylinder diesel engine capable of producing 156 horsepower (116 kW). The engine is low grade fuel tolerant, and complies with the Euro 3 emission standards. The transmission is a Mercedes-Benz 5-speed automatic.

The maximum speed of the LIV (SO) is 120 km/h (75 mph), and it has a range of 830 km (520 mi) on 150 litres (33 imp gal; 40 US gal) of fuel. The LIV (SO) is air-transportable, and its weapons station can be folded to ready the vehicle for loading inside a Sikorsky CH-53 heavy-lift transport helicopter or a CH-47 Chinook helicopter.

=== Armament and armour ===
The LIV (SO) is a lightly armoured vehicle. Its underside provides protection against hand grenade blasts, and can be upgraded to withstand anti-personnel mine blasts. Partial ballistic and hand grenade splinter protection body panels can be added, and the engine compartment can be armoured as well. The windscreen is not armoured, but is removable and can be replaced with armoured glass. The vehicle is fitted with a Rheinmetall 609K weapon station, which can be equipped with weapons such as the Heckler & Koch GMG 40 mm grenade launcher, or .50 caliber heavy machine gun. Swing arm mounts at the rear deck and the front passenger's seat allow the vehicle to be equipped with two 7.62 mm general purpose machine guns.

== Operators ==
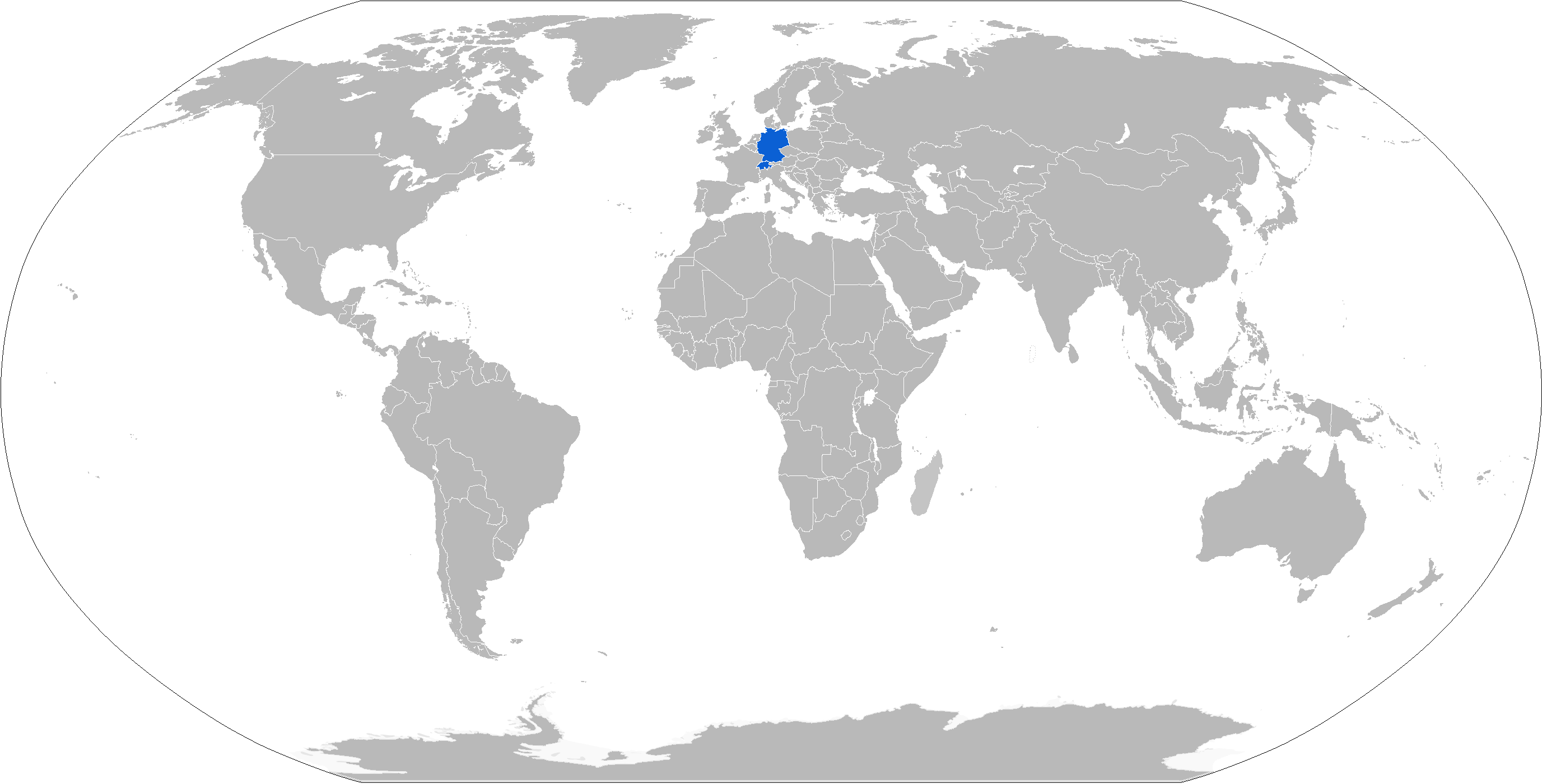
Map with LIV (SO) operators in blue

=== Current operators ===
- Germany: Used by the KSK. In August 2021, it's due to be replaced by the AGF 2.
- Switzerland
