= Tracked articulated vehicle =

Tracked vehicle which uses a swivel for steering

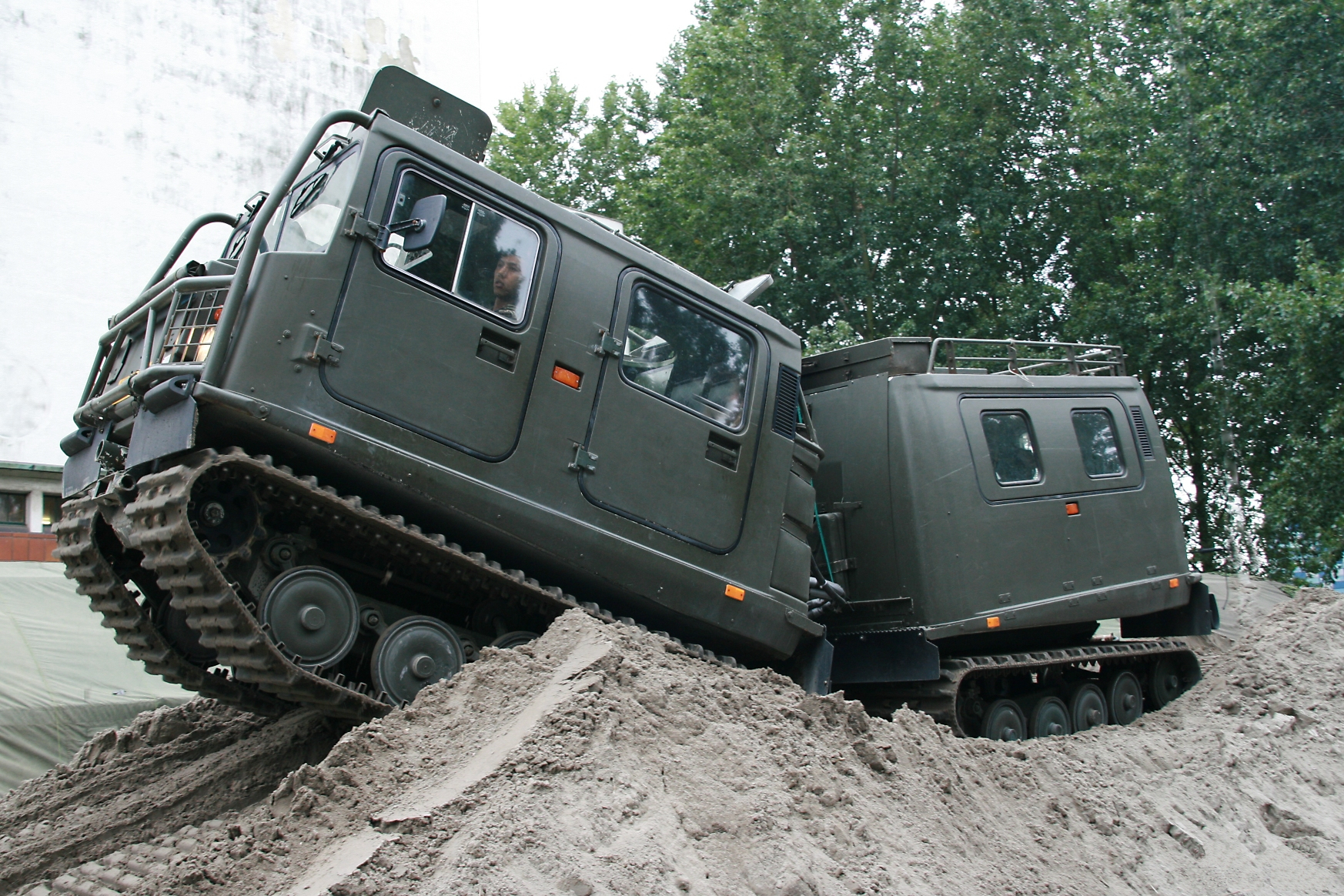
A Netherlands Marine Corps Bandvagn 206 crossing an artificial sandbank during a demonstration.

A tracked articulated vehicle or articulated tracked vehicle (abbreviated as ATV. but not to be confused with all-terrain vehicle), is a variation of a continuous track vehicle that consists of two cars, each with their own track, most commonly with an actuated linkage in between. This configuration allows an articulated tracked vehicle to turn by articulating the swivel joint in between the two vehicles (also known as articulated steering), as opposed to using differential steering to move one track faster than the other.

Tracked articulated vehicles differ from most other articulated vehicles in that in a tracked articulated vehicle both wagons are powered and that removing the coupling in between the units would render them inoperable.

== Operating principle ==
Just like conventional dual-tracked vehicles, the purpose of an articulated tracked vehicle is to better navigate off-road terrain, in particular snow, mud and other weak soil, by using long articulated tracks instead of wheels with tires. Tracked vehicles spread the ground pressure exerted on the ground by the weight of the vehicle across the whole vehicle length, reducing the ground pressure per surface area and preventing a vehicle from sinking in soft soil. However, conventional dual-track vehicles can steer only by differential steering. Doing so applies friction on the ground that must be overcome by slowing down the vehicle and increasing thrust on the one side of the tracks. If the soil is however very weak and stressed to the point of slippage, and no momentum is attained, turning can only be accomplished by decreasing thrust on the opposite track. Steering in this manner has a high probability of causing a vehicle to dig itself further into the soil and become completely immobilized. Reports from the "Mud Committee", a British military research group tasked with discovering why Allied tracked vehicles in the European theatre of World War II got stuck in mud so often, found that most of immobilisations of military vehicles occurred in this manner.

A tracked articulated vehicle is always aimed towards its running direction. Although tracked-articulated vehicles cannot turn around their own axis like differential-steering tracked vehicles, the joint introduces a turning point that allows an articulated vehicle to be steered in a manner more similar to that of a wheeled vehicle, where either the front or rear of the vehicle is turned in a direction left or right of the travel direction and the vehicle as a whole steers in a curved path. There is no major difference in the travel direction between the rear and front tracks, and thus a central differential is not required.

Tracked articulated vehicles typically steer by actuating the linkage connecting the cars of an articulated tracked vehicle. This linkage, called the train joint, uses hydraulic actuators to position the front vehicle in an opposing direction to the rear one, and curves the direction of travel this way. Alternatively but rarer, tracked articulated vehicles may contain a separate turntable that separates the drivetrain from the body, and turns the entire drivetrain in relation to the body – this method is known as wagon steering.

Tracked articulated vehicles can be longer and narrower than their dual-tracked counterparts, which need to have a certain width proportional to their length in order to steer. The narrower profile of articulated vehicles makes them encounter less friction and allows them to steer around terrain obstacles better. Tracked articulated vehicles also tend to sink into snow more evenly, instead of diving down "bottom first". An added benefit of articulated steering is reduced mechanical complexity compared to differential steering.

== Uses ==
=== Military ===
Tracked articulated vehicles are used for a variety of purposes in militaries as armoured fighting vehicles specifically geared for terrain with soft soil, in particular snow. An early example would be the Canadair RAT, which was developed to transport infantrymen and tow toboggans across the frozen lakes of the Canadian north. The Finnish Army extensively uses Sisu Nasu vehicles to traverse the snow and bogs of northern Finland. For similar purposes, the Swedish Army uses the Bandvagn 206 series in their northernmost territories as mortar carriers and armoured personnel carriers.

Within the UK and Dutch militaries, the amphibious BvS 10's are used by marines to traverse sandy beaches, but have also been used in the War in Afghanistan.

The United States Marine Corps owns 302 BvS-206. In US service they are known as the M973 Small Unit Support Vehicle (SUSV). SUSV's were deployed in Taskforce Eagle during Operation Joint Endeavor as backup vehicles should snow block up the roads to troop deployments. They are also deployed at the Mountain Warfare Training Center and have been used to train soldiers for the war in Afghanistan.

=== Resource extraction ===
In the logging, drilling, and mining industries, tracked articulated vehicles are used to move loads and personnel in remote locations. Such vehicles are marketed as being lighter and easier on the terrain due to their low ground pressure, and disturb the ground less when making sharp turns compared to tracked vehicles with differential steering, making them usable in areas with strong winter conditions or vegetation that protects the soil against unwanted erosion. The Nordtrac Terri 2020D is an example of such a vehicle that can take on a variety of roles.

=== Arctic exploration ===
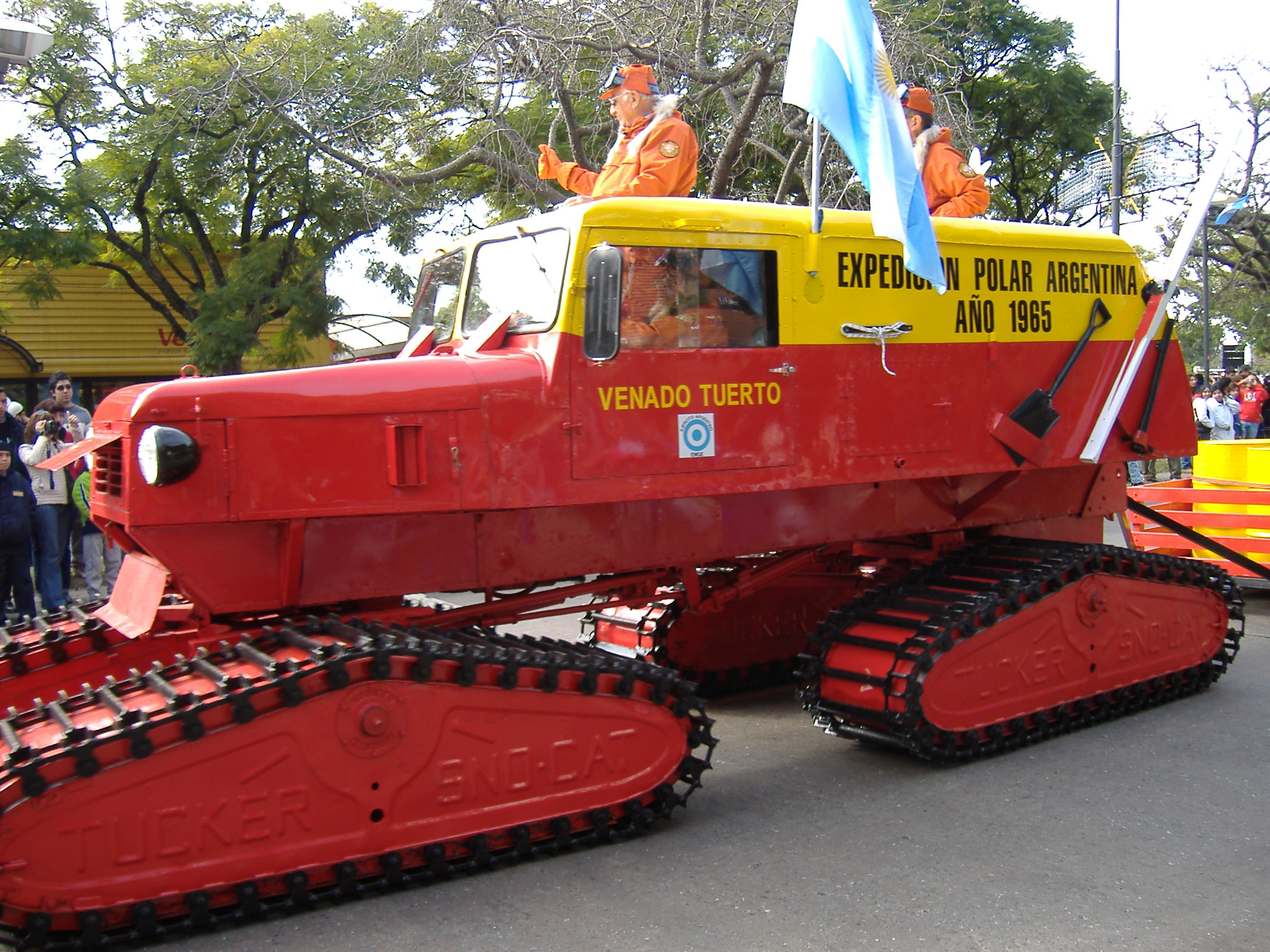
Tracked articulated vehicle used in the Argentine arctic expedition of 1965, restored for the Flag Day parade of 2006.

In the Arctic and Antarctic, tracked articulated vehicles are used for general logistics purposes in support of remote research bases. Swedish Bandvagn 206's were used as transportation during the 2007–2008 Japanese-Swedish joint Antarctic traverse.

=== Firefighting ===
Some fire departments employ tracked articulated vehicles for the express purpose of fighting fires in wooded areas susceptible to wildfires. The Singapore Civil Defence Force deploys modified military Bvs-206's, dubbed the Tracked Firefighting Vehicle (TFV), for this purpose.

== See also ==
- Half-track
- Articulated vehicle
- Mattracks
- Snow coach
