= BOR-A 550 =

Surveillance radar

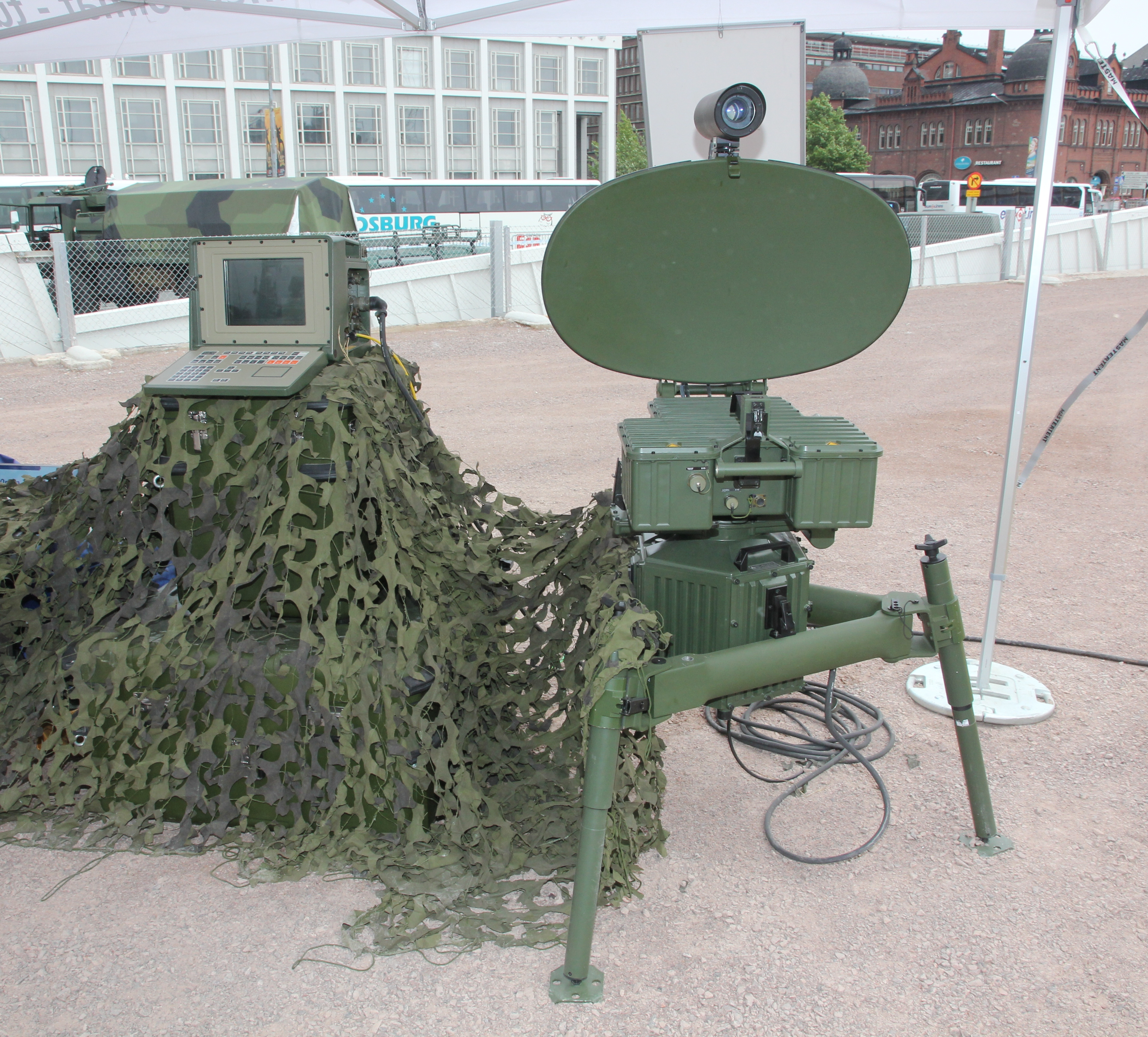
BOR-A 550 radar

BOR-A 550 is a ground and coast surveillance radar, developed by Thales Group. The radar operates on the I band, it is also man-portable and can locate targets up to a distance of 40 km in a 360° sector. It has also proven useful to locate small and slow targets, like persons or rubber boats.

The BOR-A 560 is a more powerful version with longer range.

The successor of the BOR-A family is the Ground Observer 80 (GO80) radar system.

== Users ==
- Hellenic Army: equipped on 40 M1114GRs.
