= Binz (vehicles) =

Binz GmbH & Co. KG & BINZ Ambulance- und Umwelttechnik GmbH
- Industry: Manufacturing
- Founded: 1936
- Founder: Michael Binz
- Headquarters: Ilmenau, Germany
- Products: Special vehicles for emergency services, fire trucks, police vehicles, civil protection authorities
- Number of employees: 500
- Website: http://www.binz.com/

Binz GmbH & Co. KG is a coachbuilder and custom vehicle manufacturer. It manufacturers ambulances, firetrucks, police cars and other emergency-service vehicles as well as modified military vehicles. It also produces other custom vehicles such as those for the handicapped, limousines and hearses mainly on a Mercedes-Benz platform.

== History ==
While working for Daimler as a coachbuilder, Michael Binz came up with the idea of extending a Mercedes limousine destined for German Emperor Wilhelm II. He would continue to work for other German coachbuilders, including Karosserie Baur. In 1936, Binz founded his own coachbuilding company Lorcher Karosseriefabrik BINZ & Co. The company was located in Lorch, Germany, as a continuation of the former wagon factory 'Wagenfabrik Konrad Hörger'. By 1939, Binz employed around 100 workers, producing bodies for Mercedes-Benz L3000 trucks.

After the war, Binz produced bodies for Gutbrod and Steyr-Puch cars, for Südwerke trucks and a crew cab variant of the VW T1. In 1955 Binz started production of ambulances based on the Mercedes-Benz Ponton. Binz also produced bodies for the NSU/Fiat Weinsberg 500 and Weidner 70 S. Between 1954 and 1958 they produced the Binz scooter.

Production of ambulances continued on Mercedes-Benz W110 and later on W115, as well as on Opel Rekord, Ford Transit and Range Rover basis. In 2009, Binz became an official OEM for vehicles built on the VF212 platform, a stretched version of the Mercedes-Benz E-Class (W212).

In 2012 the RMA Group acquired the assets of Binz Ilmenau to continue its operation as BINZ Ambulance- und Umwelttechnik GmbH. In 2019, Binz was liquidated following insolvency procedures. The UK based Woodall Nicholson Group acquired Binz the same year.

In 2021 Binz took over the MAN factory in Plauen, Germany, former site of Ikarus and Neoplan bus production.

== Gallery ==
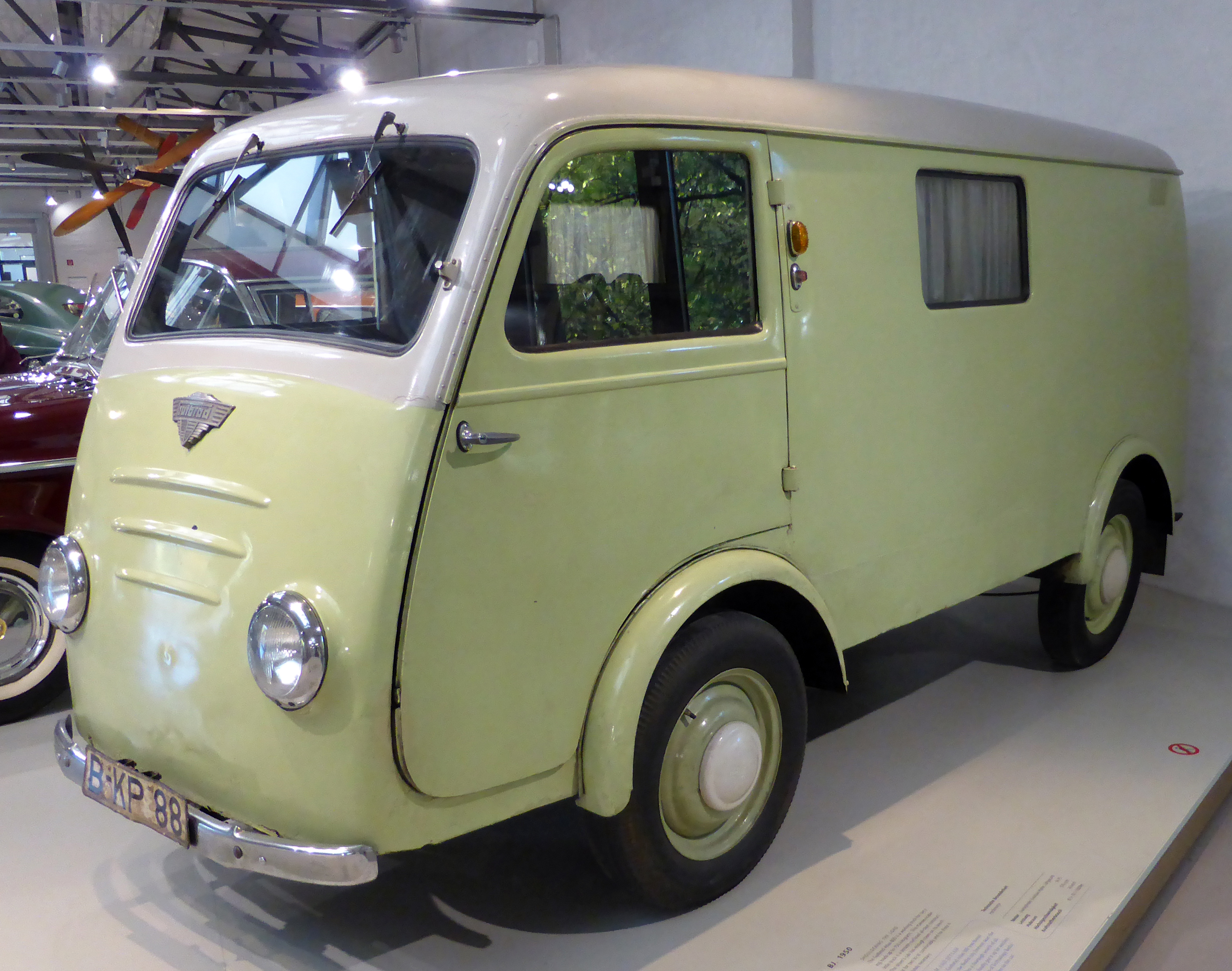
Gutbrod Atlas with Binz produced body

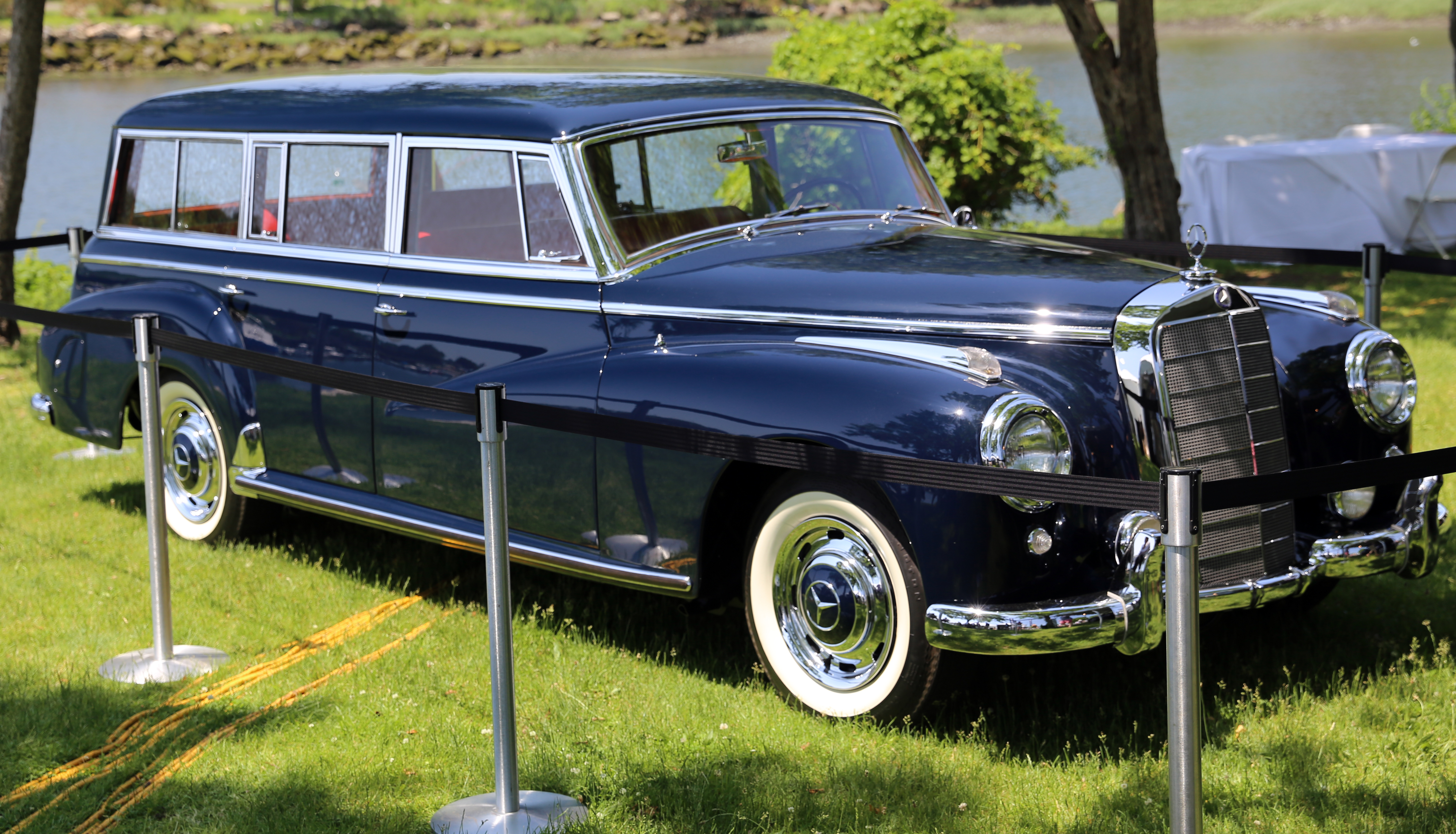
1957 Mercedes-Benz 300c wagon

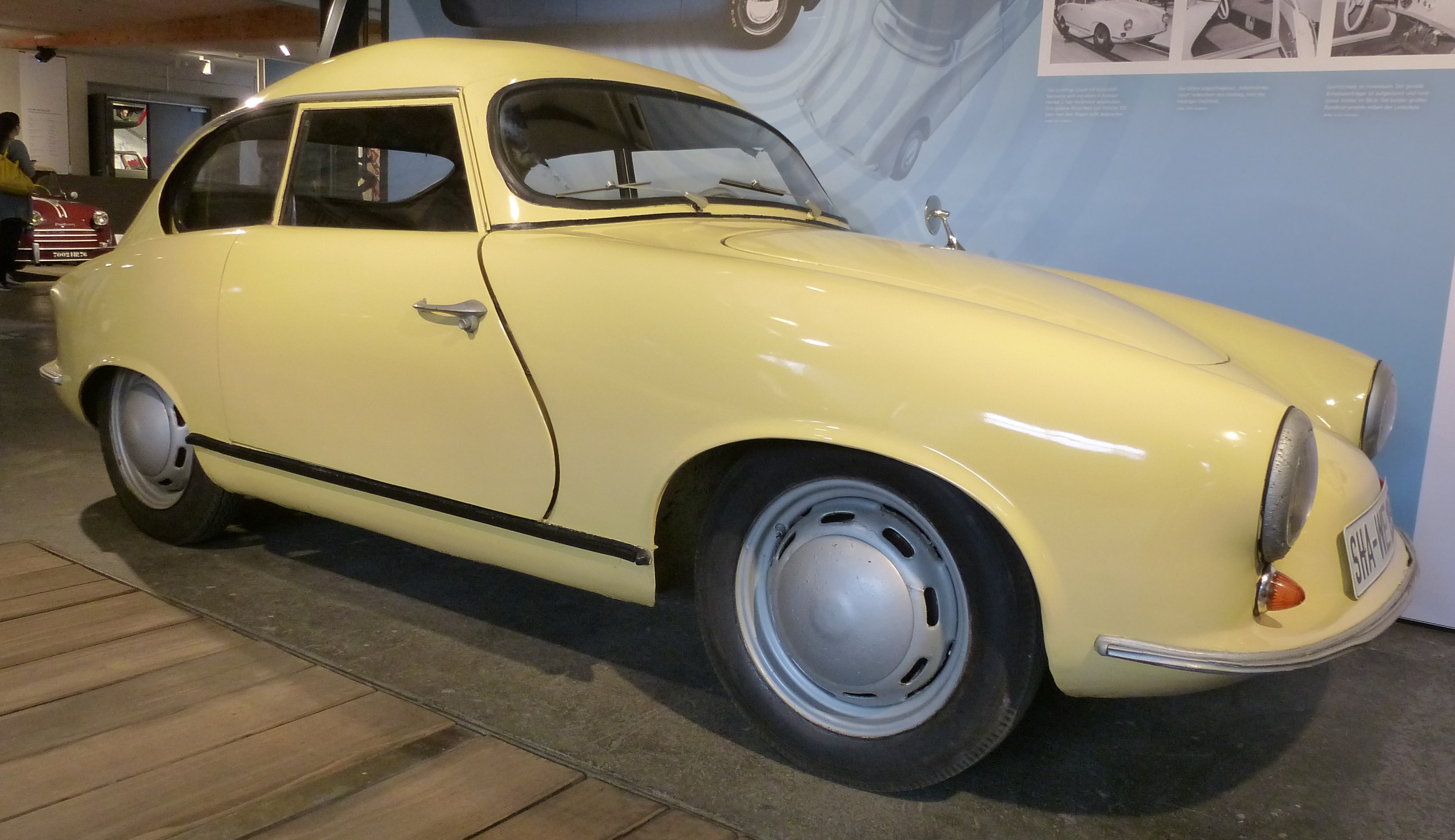
Weidner S 70

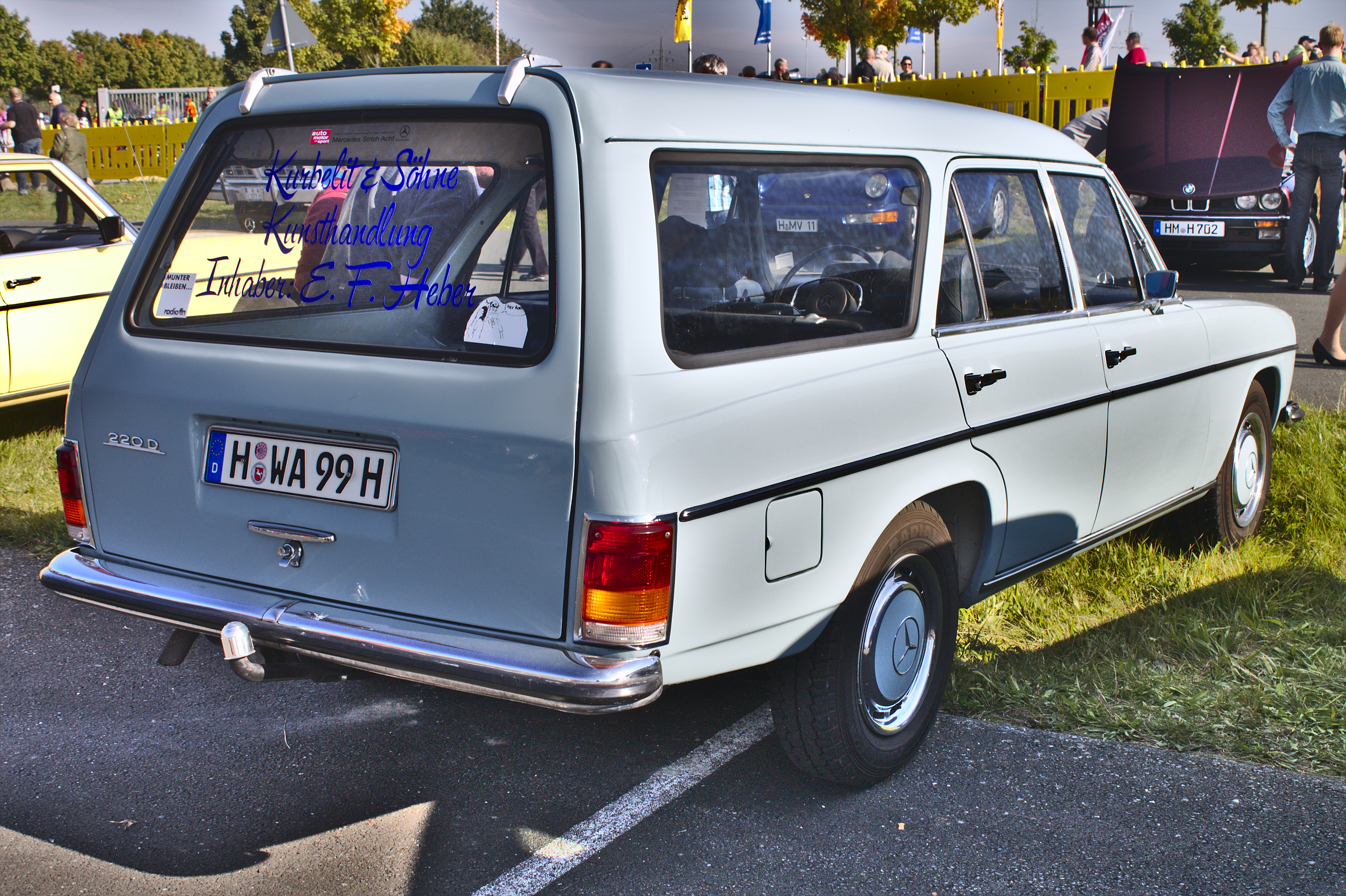
Binz-built Mercedes-Benz W115

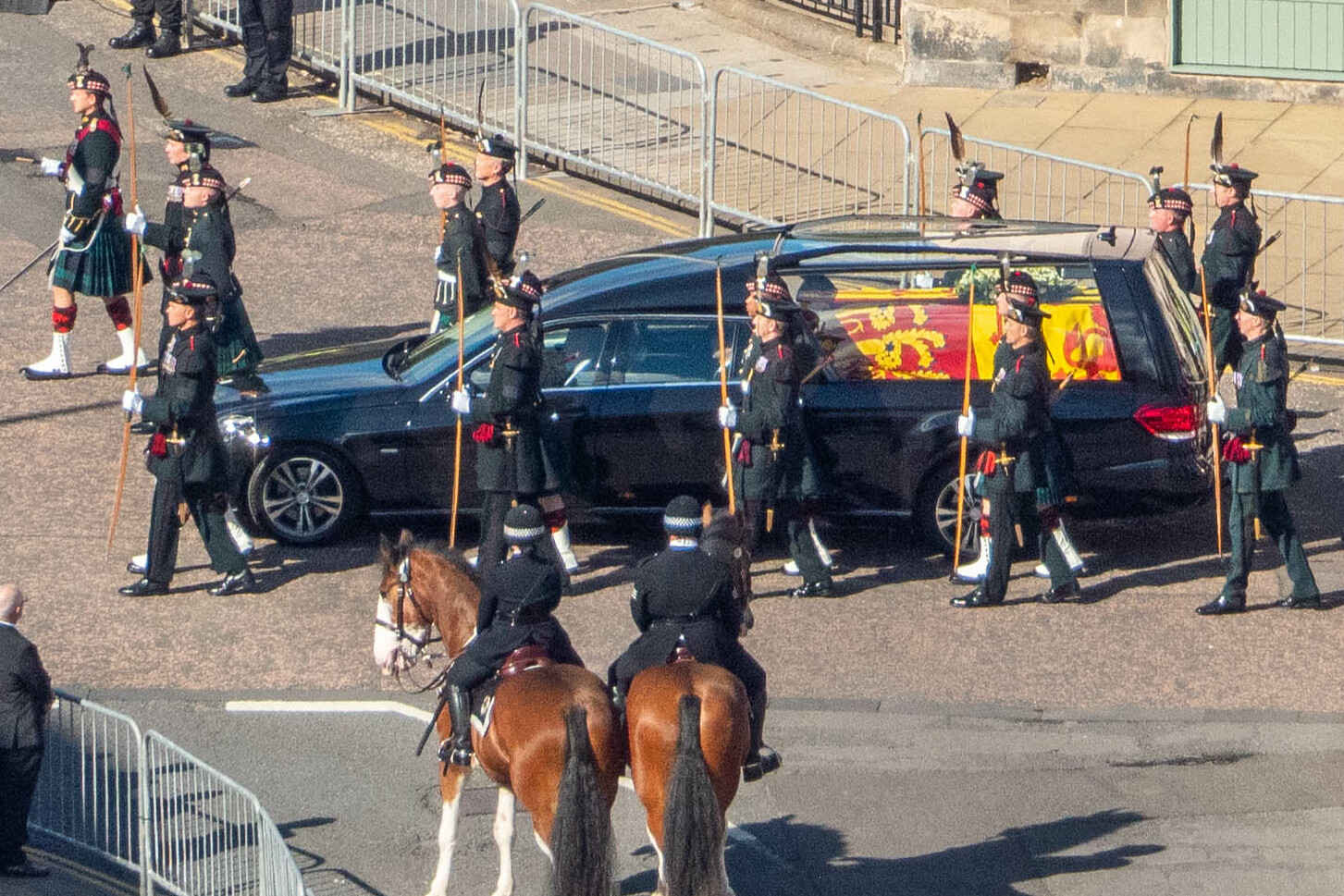
Binz Mercedes-Benz VF212 during the funeral of Elizabeth II

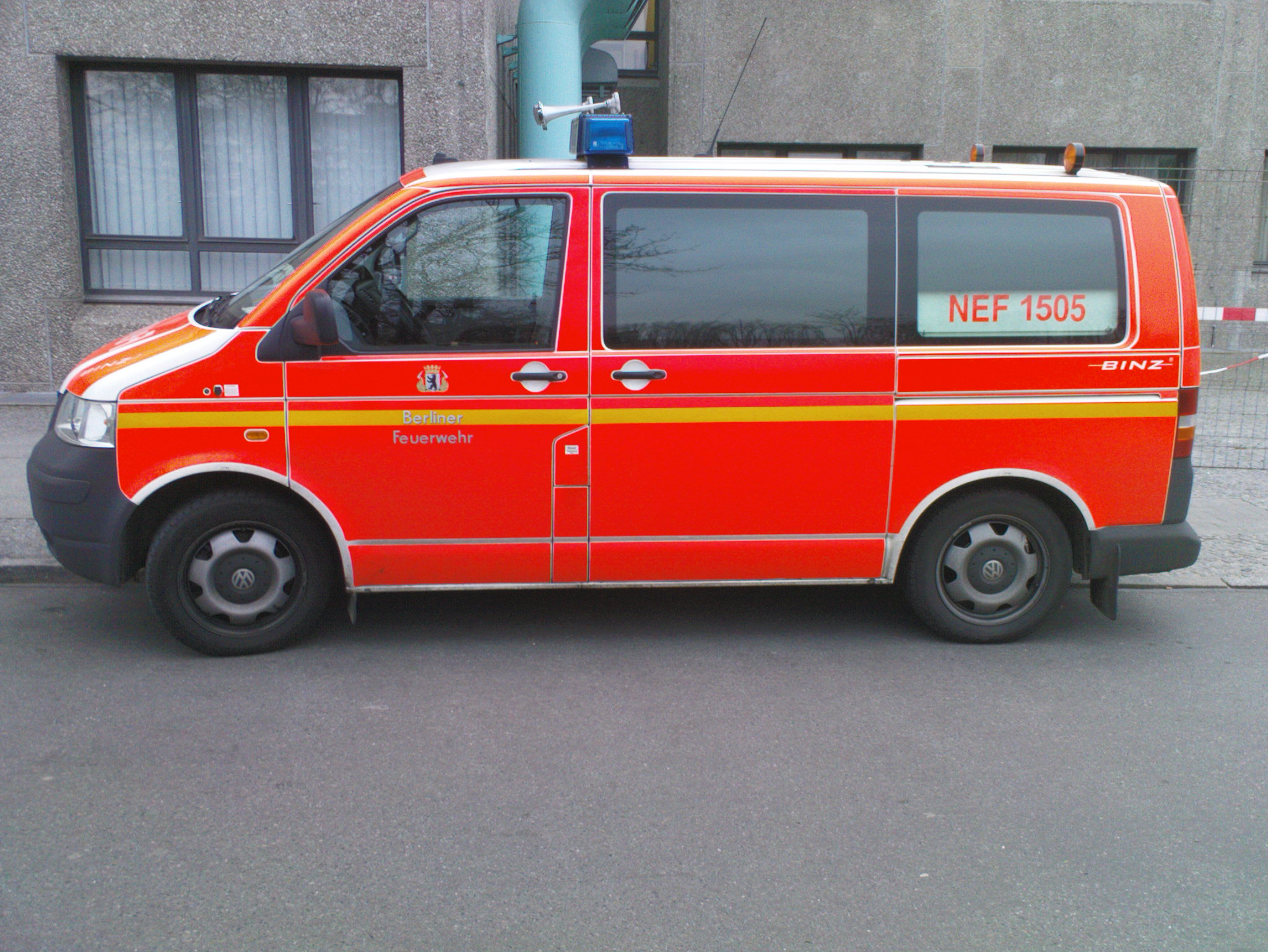
Ambulance for fire-fighting services made by Binz
