= Multitarn =

German military camouflage pattern

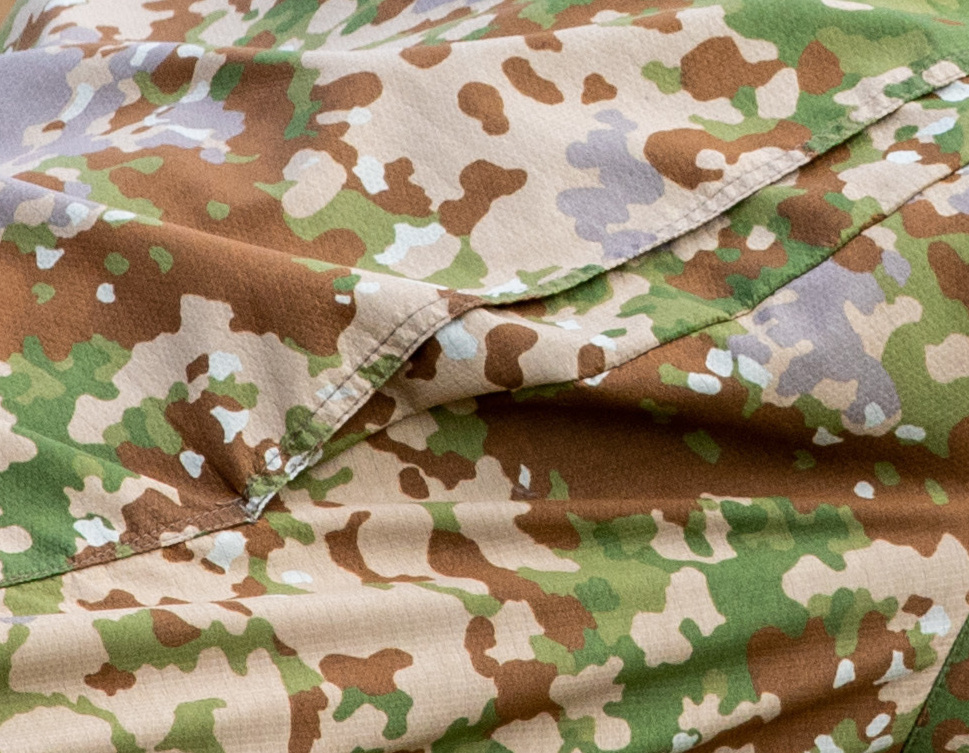
- Multitarn camouflage fabric
- Type: Military camouflage patterns
- Place of origin: Germany

Service history
- In service: 2016–present
- Used by: Bundeswehr

Production history
- Designed: 2012

Multitarn (also called Multitarndruck, Multi camouflage print) is a six‑color disruptive camouflage pattern developed by the German Bundeswehr as a universal replacement for the standard Flecktarn and Tropentarn patterns. Initially fielded as of 2016 to elite units such as the Kommando Spezialkräfte (KSK) and Kommando Spezialkräfte der Marine (KSM), it is planned for phased issue across the entire Bundeswehr by 2029.

== History ==
Development of Multitarn began in the early 2010s under the Research Institute of materials and property of the Bundeswehr (Wehrwissenschaftliche Institut für Werk- und Betriebsstoffe – WIWeB). Aiming for a camouflage pattern effective across forests, urban zones, open terrain, and transitional environments, testing initiated around 2012, and prototypes were publicly reported by 2016.

Although only special forces units used it for several years, the German Ministry of Defence formally began planning a Bundeswehr‑wide rollout in 2026, with full implementation targeted for 2028–2029. This decision followed studies showing that Multitarn provides better concealment, especially against night‑vision systems and in urban settings, and avoids singling out KSK/KSM personnel.

== Design ==
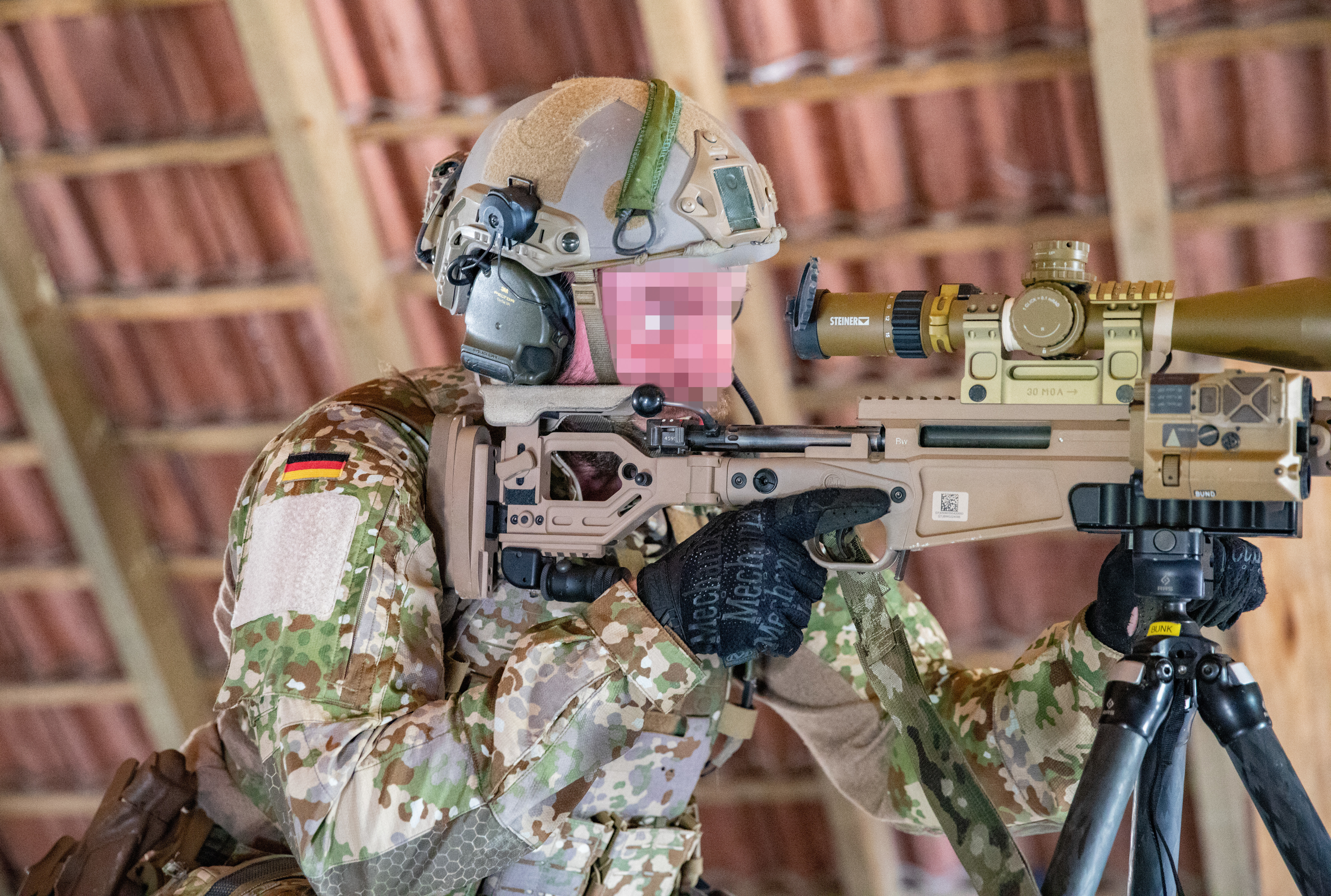
A German Kommando Spezialkräfte sniper wearing Multitarn, 2022

Multitarn is based on the Flecktarn family but employs a broader palette of six colors: light green, dark green, brown, beige, gray, and off‑white. The adapted fleck‑style pattern has smoother edges and varied spot sizes to improve concealment at multiple ranges. It is optimized for multispectral concealment, particularly in the near‑infrared (700–1200 nm) band, reducing visibility to night vision devices.

The pattern was designed to provide adequate effectiveness in a wide range of environments, including forest, urban, arid, and transitional zones, rather than excelling in a single terrain type. This "jack‑of‑all‑trades" approach mirrors multinational universal patterns, such as the UK's MTP and the U.S. MultiCam.

Unlike Flecktarn, which has distinct five‑color (temperate) and three‑color (Tropentarn, desert) variants, Multitarn is a unified six‑color universal pattern intended to replace both. No separate desert or snow versions have been formally developed. Also unlike with its previous flecktarn patterns, the Bundeswehr has taken strict measures over its property rights and distribution control to prevent unauthorized and illegal production of the pattern outside the Bundeswehr's authorized contractors.

== Operational use ==
Multitarn was first issued to German special forces units, where it was used for overseas and mission-specific operations since 2016. The pattern's exclusive use by such units raised concern that it made elite troops identifiable. As of around November 2020, some 4,000 Bundeswehr personnel were issued various gear in the pattern.

Beginning circa 2026, broader deployment is planned to take place; field testing and procurement plans aim at replacing Flecktarn and Tropentarn with Multitarn across Heer, Luftwaffe, Marine, and support services by 2029.

== See also ==
- Flecktarn
- Tropentarn
- MultiCam
- Multi-Terrain Pattern
