= Flecktarn =

German military camouflage pattern

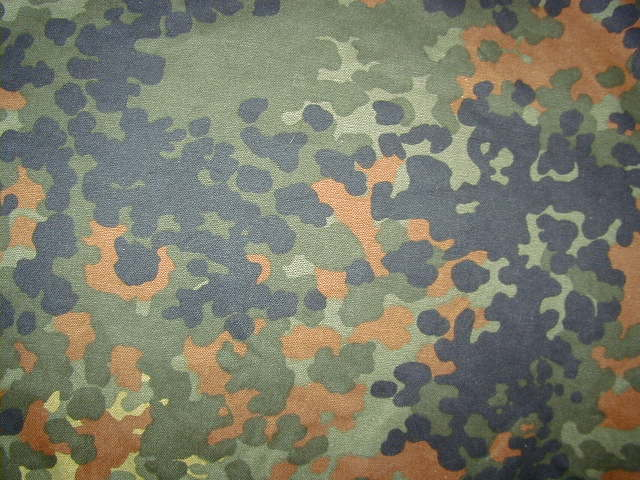
- Flecktarn camouflage woodland fabric swatch
- Type: Military camouflage patterns
- Place of origin: Germany

Service history
- In service: 1990–present
- Used by: See Users
- Wars: Bosnian War; Kosovo War; War in Afghanistan; Iraq War; Somali Civil War; Mali War; Russo-Ukrainian War

Production history
- Designed: 1976
- Variants: See Variants

Flecktarn (German pronunciation: [ˈflɛktaʁn]; "mottled camouflage"; also known as Flecktarnmuster or Fleckentarn) is a family of three-, four-, five- or six-color disruptive camouflage patterns, the most common being the five-color pattern which is the woodland version, consisting of dark green, grey-green, red brown, and black over a light green or tan base depending on the manufacturer. The original German five-color pattern was designed for use in European temperate woodland terrain. A three-color variation is also available, which is in use in arid or desert environments. There is some confusion about the name of the three-color variant, which is often called either Wüstentarn (desert camo) or Tropentarn (tropical camo), both of which are not official names. The Bundeswehr uses a set of fabrics for hot climates which is part of the Tropenuniform (tropical uniform) and intended for arid and desert conditions. The official names are "5-Farb-Tarndruck" (for the green variant) and "3-Farb-Tarndruck" (for the arid variant).

Tracing its origins to the introduction of the Waffen-SS “dot-pattern” (or Punktmuster in German) camouflage designs during World War II, the original German five-colour Flecktarn has since been adopted, copied, and modified by numerous countries for their own camouflage patterns.

Flecktarn will be replaced by Multitarn in the Bundeswehr within a four-year period from 2026 to 2029.

== History ==
The dot-pattern principle on which Flecktarn is directly based was designed by Johann Georg Otto Schick, director of the Waffen-SS “T” (Tarnung) Department. The Waffen-SS were among the first military forces to issue camouflage patterns on such large scale, being equipped with various designs and variations, most of which were based on the dot-pattern principle from which Flecktarn would also later derive.

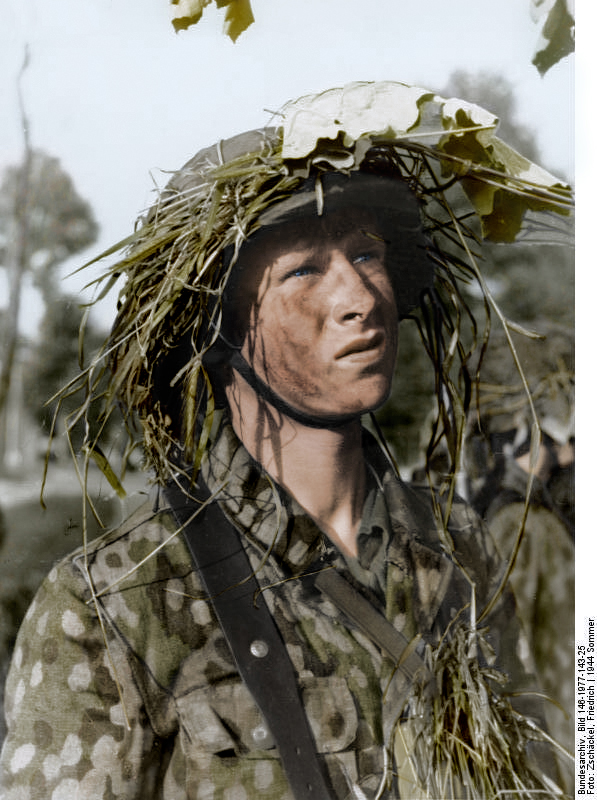
Eichenlaubmuster used by a Waffen-SS Grenadier in France, 1944.

The Waffen-SS Platanenmuster pattern, developed by Schick in 1936, is generally considered as the origin of the Flecktarn pattern family. It was followed by various related designs and variations throughout the Second World War, including Rauchtarnmuster, Palmenmuster, Eichenlaubmuster and Erbsenmuster.

Between 1955 and 1956, the Bundeswehr and the Belgian Army briefly used a version of the WWII Wehrmacht's camouflage pattern Leibermuster, potentially with the intention of establishing a standard camouflage pattern for the proposed European Defence Community (EDC). Following the abandonment of the EDC proposal, plans to develop a common European camouflage pattern were also discontinued.

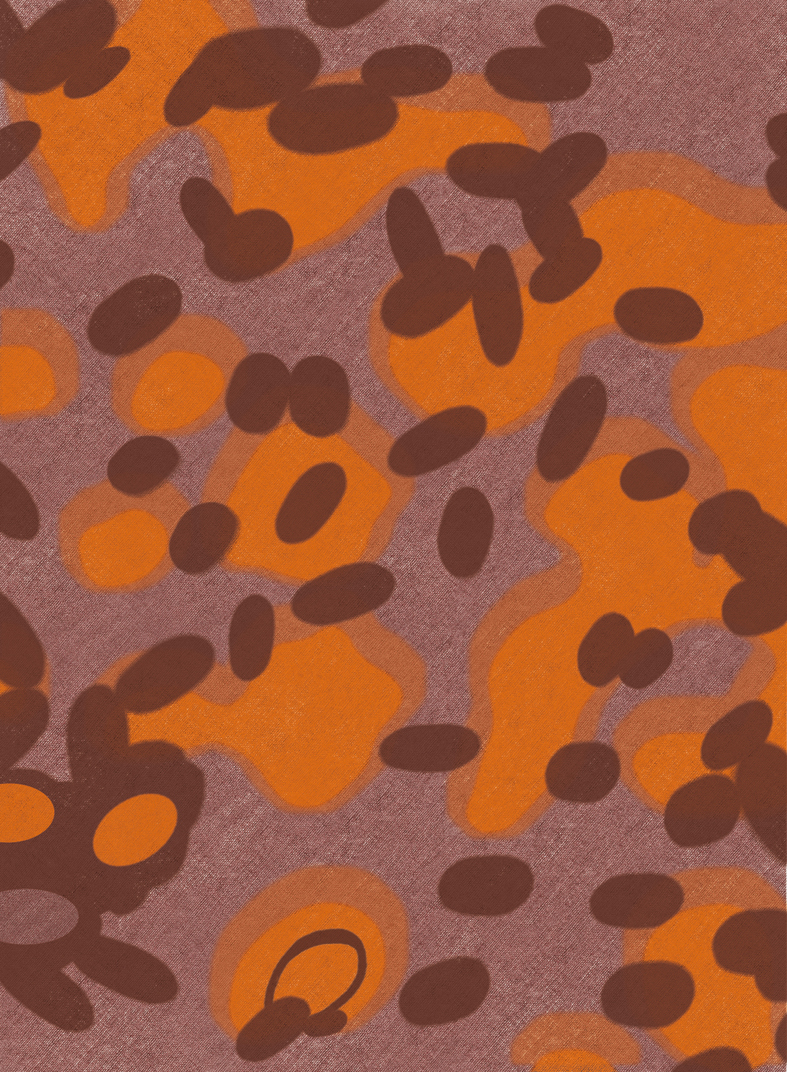
Platanenmuster camouflage pattern. Designed in 1936 for the Waffen-SS.

In 1976, interest was renewed in finding a suitable camouflage pattern for the Bundeswehr. The same year, the Bundeswehr in Germany developed a number of prototype camouflage patterns, to be trialed as replacements for the solid olive-grey "moleskin" combat uniform. At least four distinct camouflage patterns were tested during Bundeswehr Truppenversuch 76 ("Bundeswehr Troop Trial 76".) These were based on patterns in nature: one was called "Dots" or "Points"; another was called "Ragged Leaf" or "Saw Tooth Edge"; another was based on pine needles in winter. Flecktarn B, which bore resemblance to the Waffen-SS’s dot-pattern camouflages, particularly Platanenmuster and Erbsenmuster, ultimately proved the most effective for Central European terrain.

The Bundeswehr kept its green combat dress throughout the 1980s, however, while trials were conducted and development continued for the pattern. Flecktarn was only widely introduced in 1990 in a newly reunited Germany, quickly phasing out the previous combat dress.

In 1993, the "Tropentarn" or "Wüstentarn" derivate of Flecktarn was introduced for use in arid and desertic environments, particularly in preparation for the planned deployment to Somalia. It was subsequently worn by the Bundeswehr in Afghanistan and in other deployments in arid regions.

== Modern patterns ==
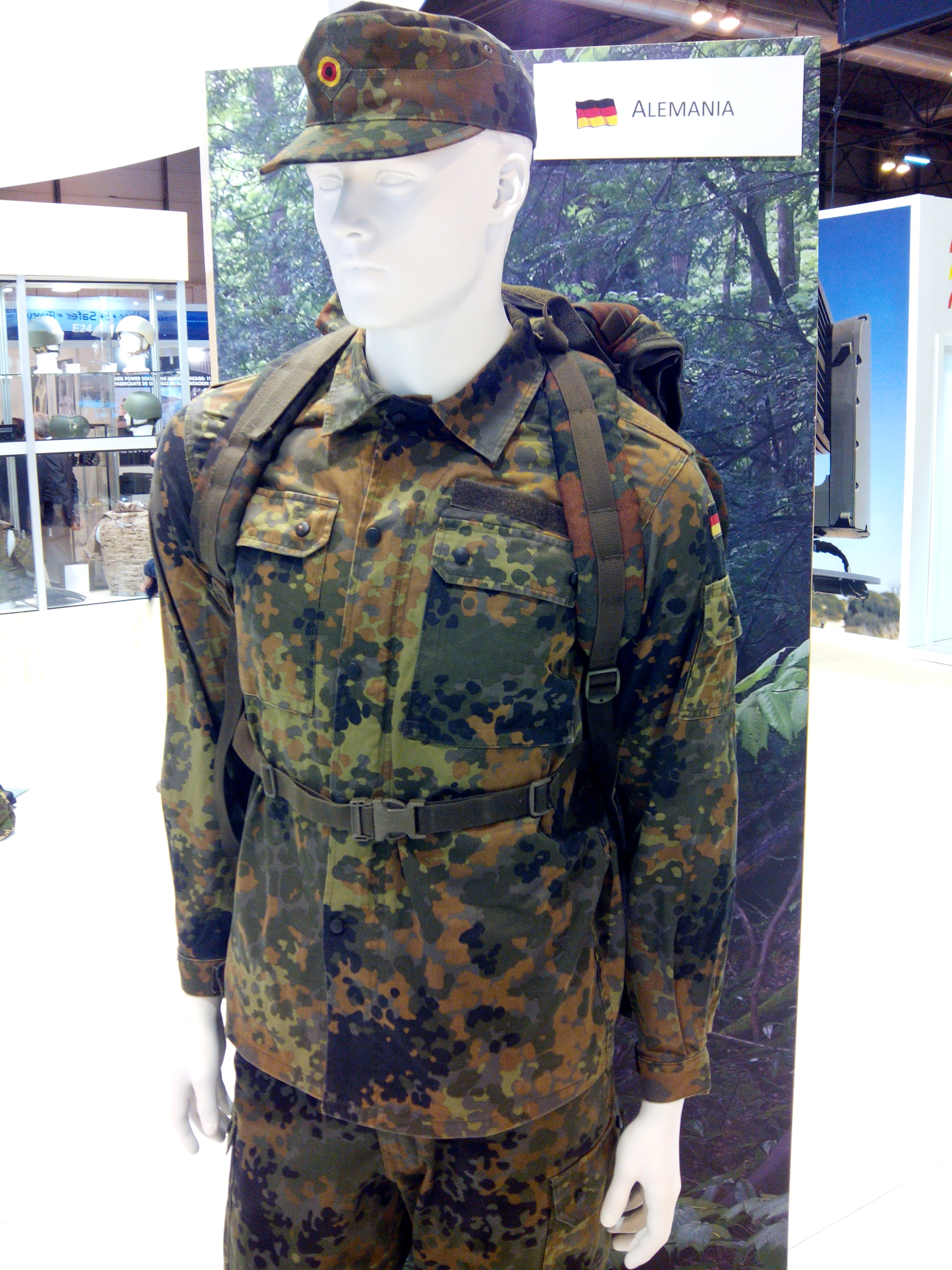
German Flecktarn uniform in 2015

Designed by the German company Marquardt & Schulz, several patterns were developed and tested by the German military. The pattern named "Flecktarn B" was chosen as the final pattern for use. The word flecktarn is a composite formed from the German words Fleck (spot, blot(ch), mark or mottle) and Tarnung (camouflage.)

In 1985 the Dutch government tested Flecktarn B with soldiers of its 13th Armored Brigade in Oirschot. Locally named "Stippel", the pattern met with media opposition for its perceived similarity to Waffen-SS "peas" and "oak leaves" camouflage. Among other criticisms, there were complaints from some users about double vision when looking at the “dot pattern” for a long time. The Dutch government scrapped the plan completely in 1987.

In Germany, the Flecktarn camouflage pattern is used by all Bundeswehr service branches, the Heer (army), the Luftwaffe (air force), some Marine (navy) units and even the Sanitätsdienst (medical service.) Its official name is 5 Farben-Tarndruck der Bundeswehr (five-color camouflage print of the Bundeswehr.) This temperate Flecktarn five-color scheme consists of 15% light green, 20% light olive, 35% dark green, 20% brown and 10% black.

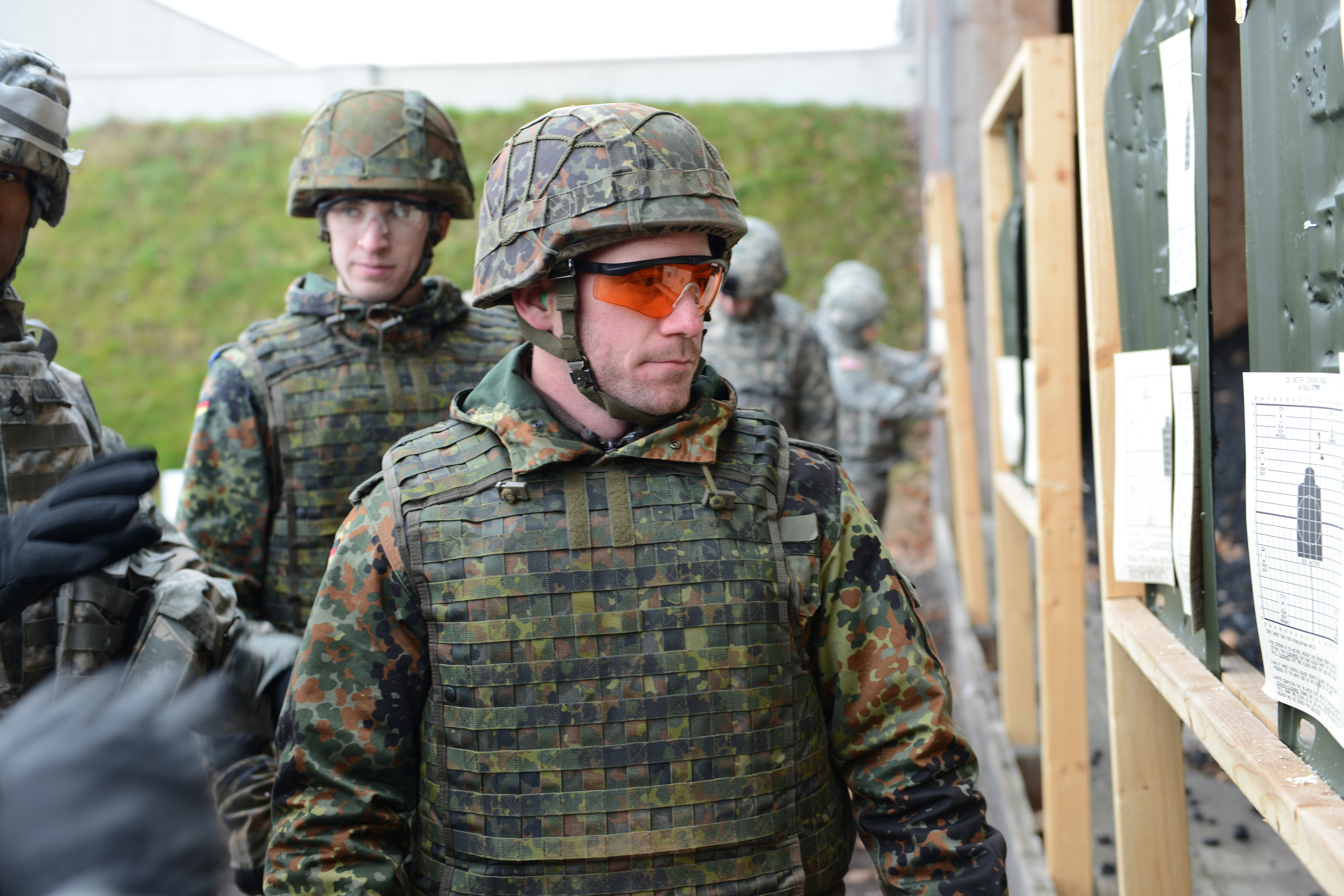
German body armour cover and helmet cover in Flecktarn

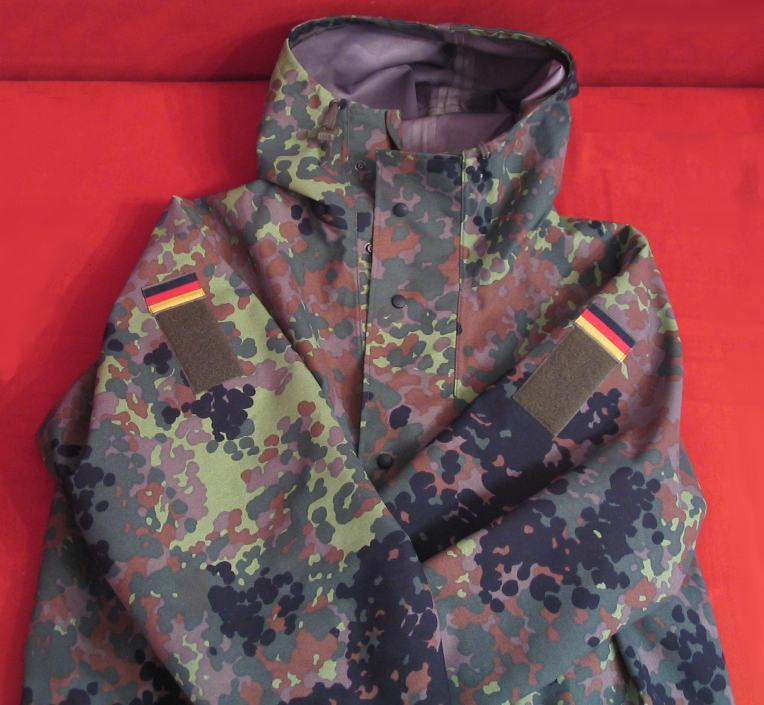
Jacket

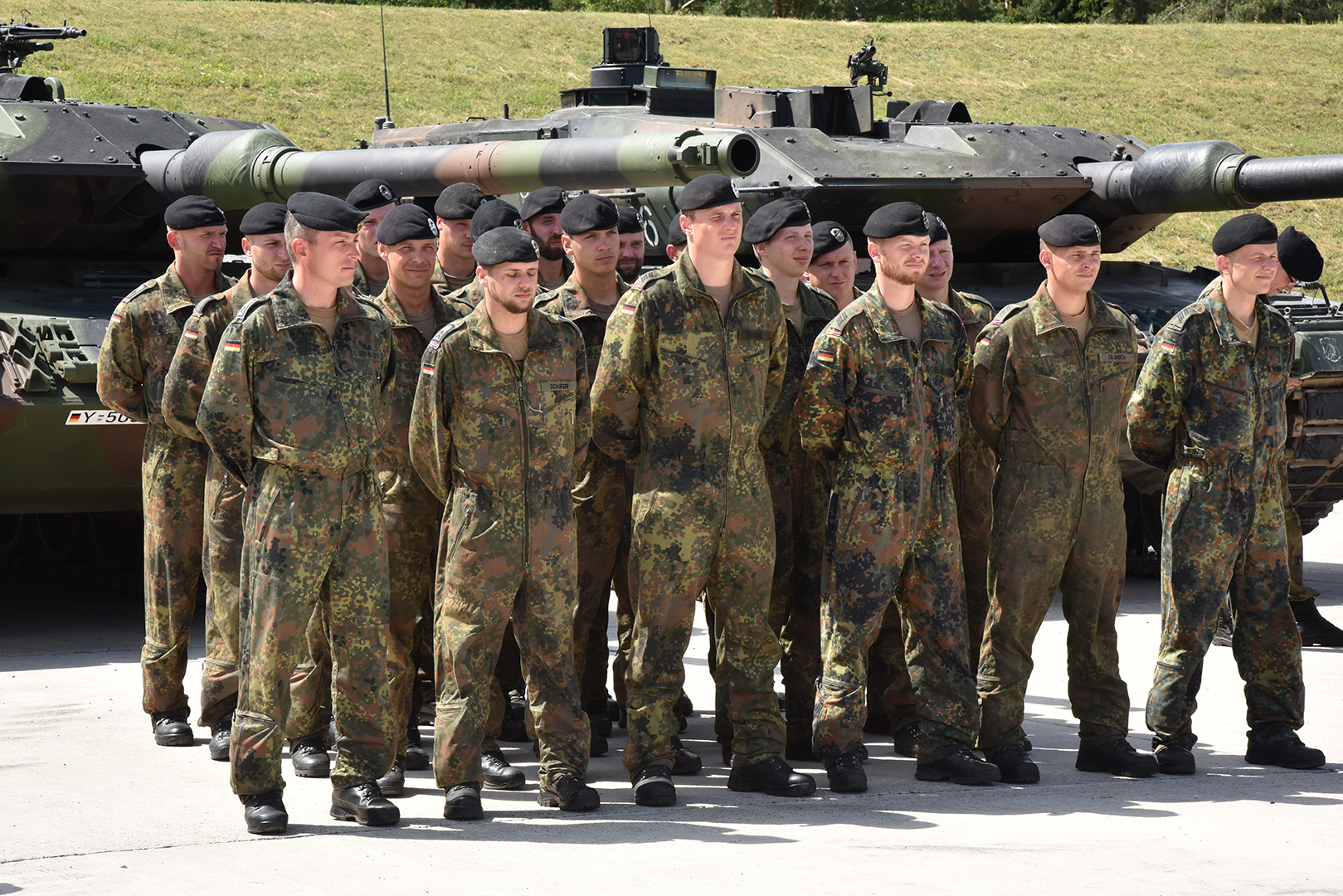
Flecktarn overalls for crews of tanks in 2018

=== Evolution ===
Manufacturing contractors for the Bundeswehr are bound by the requirements and specifications laid out by the Bundesamt für Ausrüstung, Informationstechnik und Nutzung der Bundeswehr - BAAINBw (Federal Office of Bundeswehr Equipment, Information Technology and In-Service Support of the German Armed Forces.) The specific document that contractors must comply with is the Technische Lieferbedingungen - TL (Technical Delivery Conditions.)

Within the TL are material performance sheets for all products conforming to civilian, ISO, and military specifications, as applicable. The TL requirements for flecktarn have undergone changes over the years and the pattern is now in its fifth iteration. The most observable changes have been to the colors, most notably from about 2005 whereupon the color screens became more separated making the pattern overall brighter. Visually the green and grey screens of post-2005 flecktarn are lighter with greater separation and the brown screen has become more of a rust-like color, whereas the former green and grey screens were darker and closer in hue and the brown screen was more of a reddish-brown. In the modern colors the black screen now presents in sharp contrast to the rest of the colors.

== Pattern ==
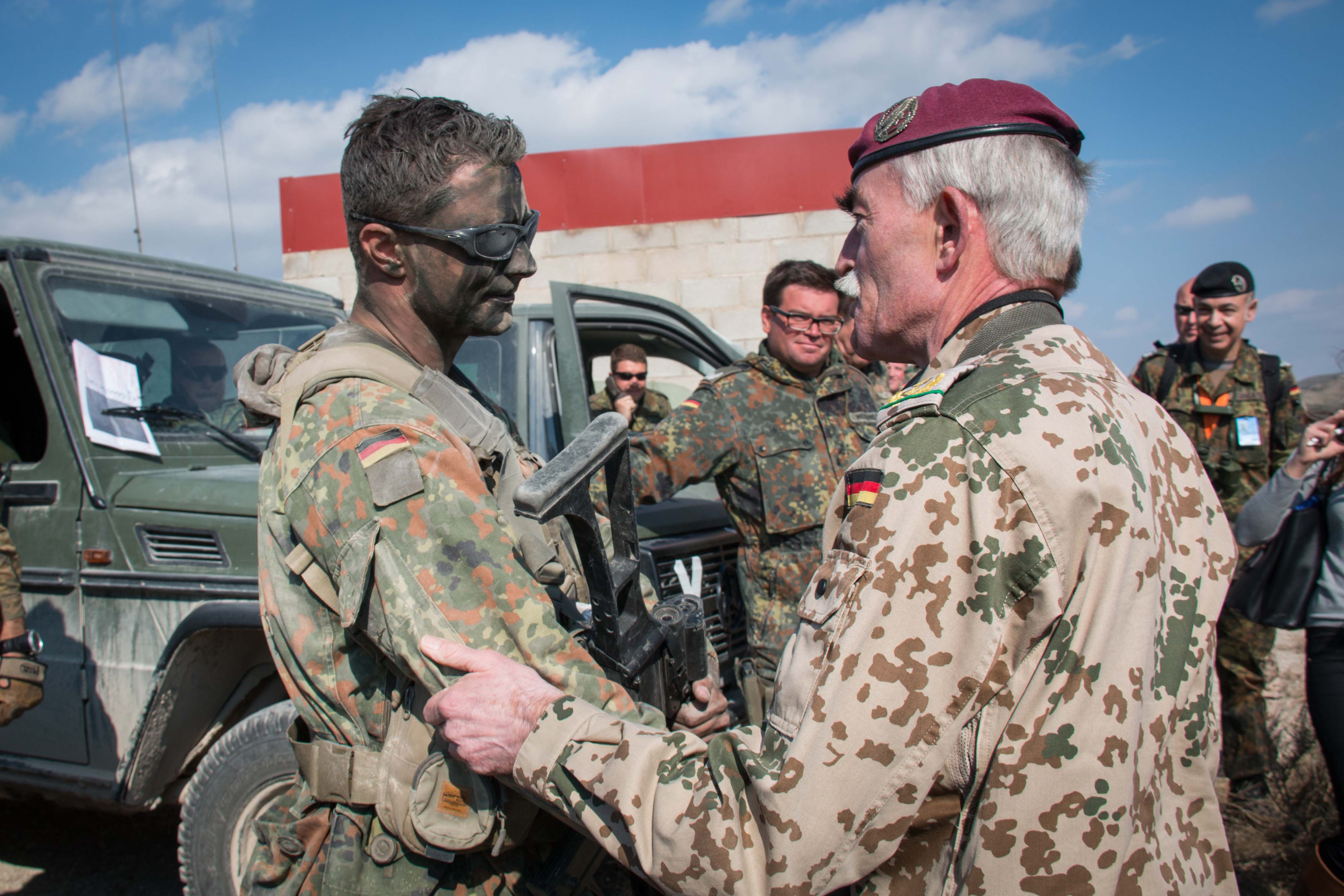
Soldier on the left is wearing Tropentarn. Soldier on the right is wearing Wüstentarn. Soldiers in the background are wearing the common dark green Flecktarn.

There are three different Flecktarn. The common dark green Flecktarn, the Tropentarn (tropical camouflage) and Wüstentarn (desert camouflage). Tropentarn is Bundeswehr 5-color Flecktarn printed on lighter weight fabric. All colors (dark green, grey-green, red brown, and black over a light green or tan base depending on the manufacturer) are a bit brighter than the common dark green Flecktarn. On the tropentarn fabric the brown screen is more of a "rust" color and the black screen contrasts sharply against the dark green and grey-green screens. The term is sometimes erroneously used for Bundeswehr 3-color desert camouflage, Wüstentarn. Both patterns are printed on the same fabric type.

=== Multitarn replacement ===
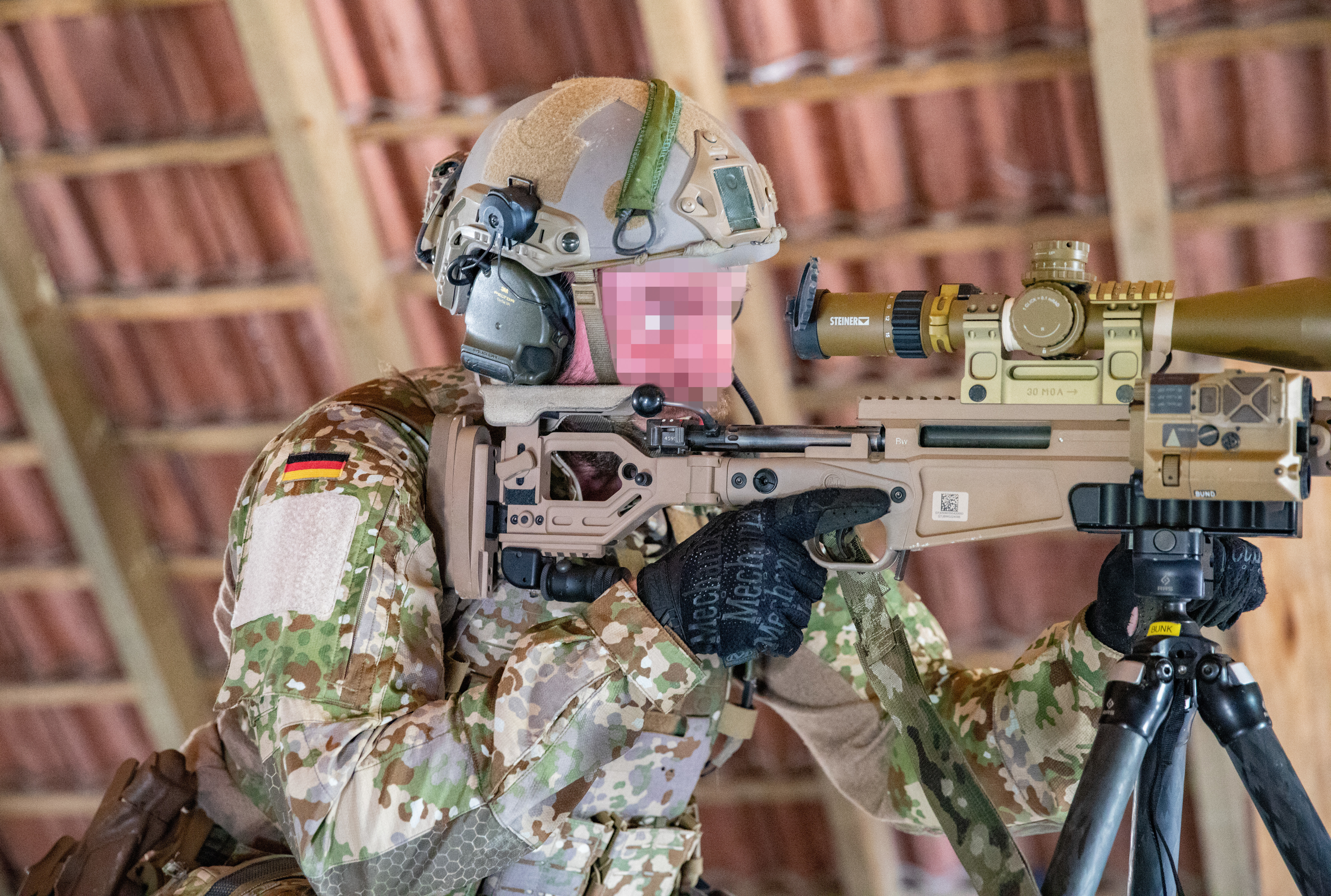
A German KSK member wearing the new Bundeswehr Multitarn camo pattern.

In 2016, tests were conducted by the Research Institute of materials and property of the Bundeswehr (Wehrwissenschaftliche Institut für Werk- und Betriebsstoffe – WIWeB) on a new pattern designated Multitarn as a potential replacement for flecktarn.

The pattern is intended as a multi-terrain pattern, initially for use only by German special forces. The Bundeswehr initially expressed plans for adoption by multiple divisions of the Bundeswehr to complement existing flecktarn patterns but as of 2022 this had not occurred. Unlike with its previous flecktarn patterns the Bundeswehr has taken strict measures over its property rights and distribution control to prevent unauthorized and illegal production of the pattern outside the Bundeswehr's authorized contractors.

== Variants ==
=== Belgium ===
Bundeswehr flecktarn was used by airbase security and anti-aircraft units of the Belgian Air Force from 1988 to 2000. The pattern was unchanged from the original but slightly larger than the eventual Bundeswehr production pattern. It is noteworthy here that the model developed in Germany was put into general use by the Belgian Air Force almost three years before it was introduced into the Bundeswehr. A modular kit and a two-piece rucksack in flecktarn pattern was used to complete the uniform of field trousers, blouse and parka.

=== Russia ===
The Russian military uses a wide range of different commercial camouflage patterns including several variations of flecktarn. One is called Sever ("north") or Flectar-D. This pattern is a three-color pattern which is almost identical to Danish M84 but the base screen is tan. The pattern was introduced in Russia in 2006.

Another variant is called Tochka-4 (Point-4) produced by the Russian company Modoks. The pattern is essentially Flectar-D with a fourth color, brown, added.

Another pattern resembling Bundeswehr five-color flecktarn has been used by some Russian forces with the difference being that the brown screen is red.

=== Japan ===
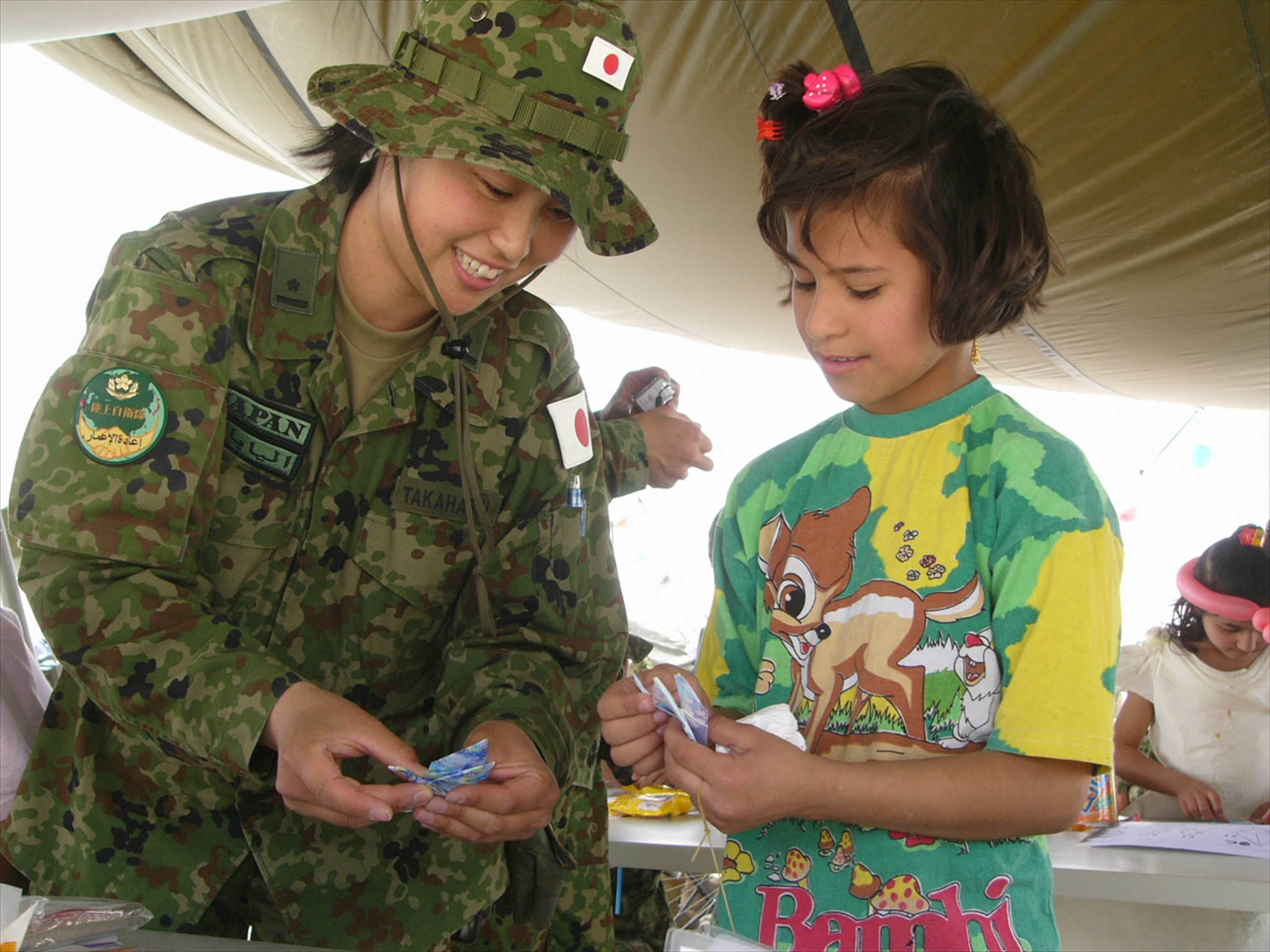
Japanese flecktarn

Japan adopted a flecktarn-based pattern called Type II Camouflage, or Jietai which has been in use with the Japan Ground Self-Defense Force since 1985. This pattern is a four-color version consisting of light green, brown and black on a beige background. A desert version is also in use.

=== China ===
Type 03 Plateau camouflage is a five-color flecktarn pattern that was formerly used in the early 2000s by the Chinese military in Tibet. It consists of a base color of sand with grey, light-brown, mid-brown, and black. Although the artwork is identical to the German original the Chinese version is only a portion of the complete pattern. Among collectors it is alternatively called "Tibetarn" or Tibet flecktarn. The pattern was replaced by a four-color digitalized version called 07 Arid Camouflage ("07式荒漠迷彩作训服") in 2007.

Some Russian special forces have also used this same pattern. The Russian version is made locally for military contractors by SPLAV.

=== Poland ===
The Samodzielny Pododdzial Antyterrorystyczny Policji - SPAP (anti-terrorism unit of the Polish National Police) have used a five-color flecktarn variant called WZ AT 1 Plamiak, also known as Metro colloquially. The pattern is different in that it repeats itself regularly in the print at relatively short intervals. A woodland version referred to as Gepard has been used by the Agencja Bezpieczenstwa Wewnetrznego - ABW (Polish Internal Security Agency.) A five-color desert version was also developed.

A flecktarn camo made by Kama is in use by the Implementation Department, Metropolitan Police Command, Warsaw Police.

=== Indonesia ===
In June 2022, Indonesia's Detasemen Khusus 88 Antiteror - DENSUS 88 AT (Police Counter-Terrorism Force) were seen wearing a flecktarn-influenced six-color camouflage uniform consisting of a tan base with three shades of green along with chocolate brown and near-black. The unit's Owl's Head logo is discretely incorporated in the pattern.

=== Bulgaria ===
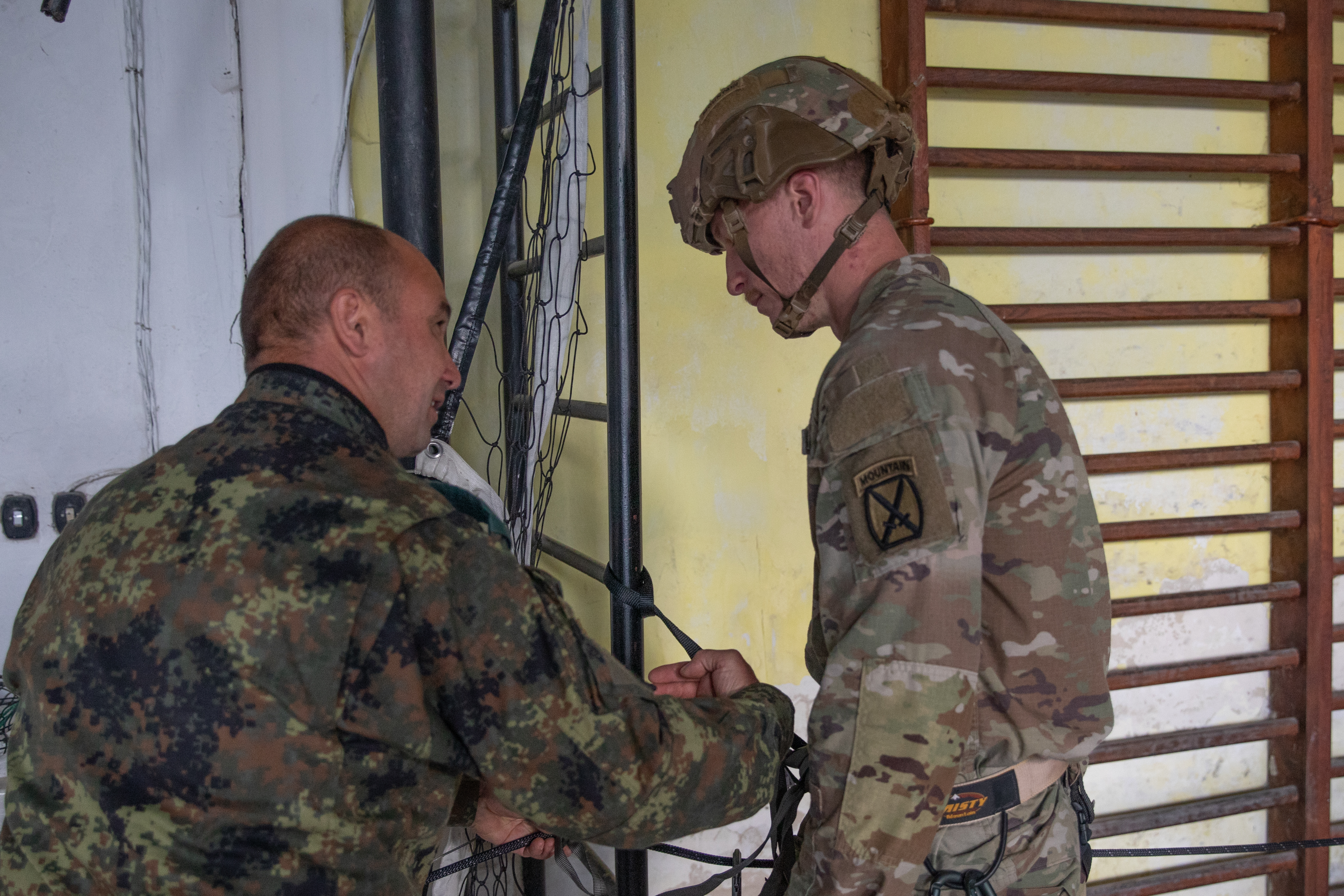
Bulgarian soldier with U.S. soldier in 2023

A semi-digitized version of the original German five-color pattern in post-2005 colors, designated M-18, was adopted by the Bulgarian army in 2018.

=== Yemen ===
The Special Security Forces of Yemen adopted a five-color digitalized pattern which could be said to resemble flecktarn but with darker colours similar to the pre-2005 colorway.

=== France ===
France's urban warfare training center, Centre d'entraînement aux actions en zone urbaine (CENZUB), located in Aisne, France outfits its trainees in a blue-dominant flecktarn pattern when taking place in OPFOR exercises. The pattern consists of white, grey, light-blue, purple, and brown

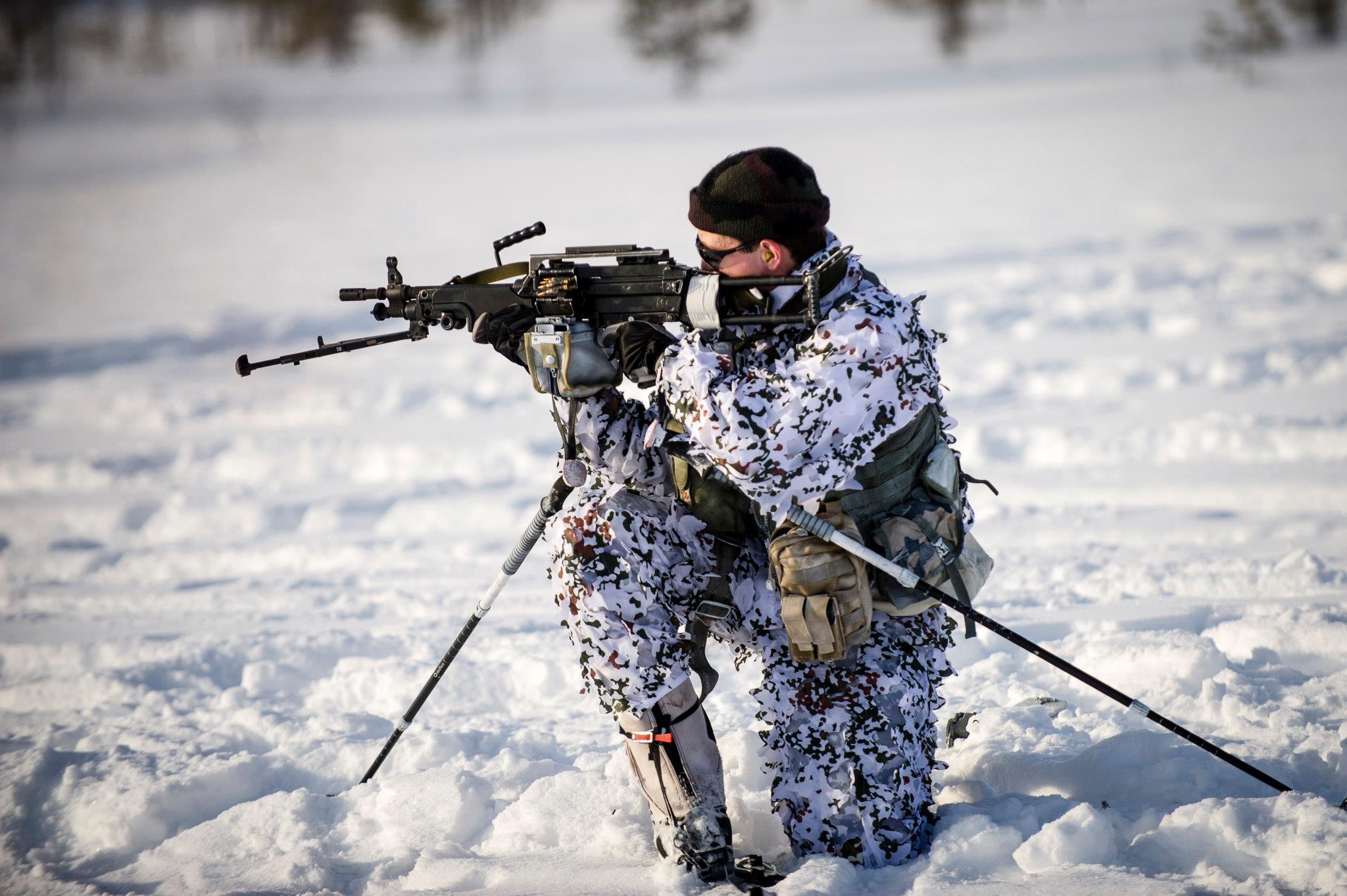
French soldier of the 13th RDP wears "Schneetarn" camo in snow

The 13e Régiment de Dragons Parachutistes (13th RDP) of the French Army officially uses the commercially produced "Schneetarn" pattern marketed by Germany company TacGear in snow environments. This winter camouflage pattern is a derivative of Danish M84 camouflage pattern, incorporating black and olive green blotches on a pure white background.

=== Commercial variants ===
- In 2013, the German company Mil-Tec introduced a new version of Flecktarn, called the Arid Flecktarn. It retains the original five-color pattern but with the color scheme resembling that of MultiCam. It remains a commercial variant and is not in use by any world military.
- German Woodland is a commercially available copy of five-color flecktarn produced in China. The pattern is only a portion of the original Bundeswehr pattern and the green and brown screens have been inverted. On Alibaba and Aliexpress sites it is sometimes listed as flecktarn. This Chinese copy has been used by some sections of the Armed Forces of the Kyrgyz Republic as noted during the Osh ethnic clashes of 2010.
Austrian Flecktarnmuster

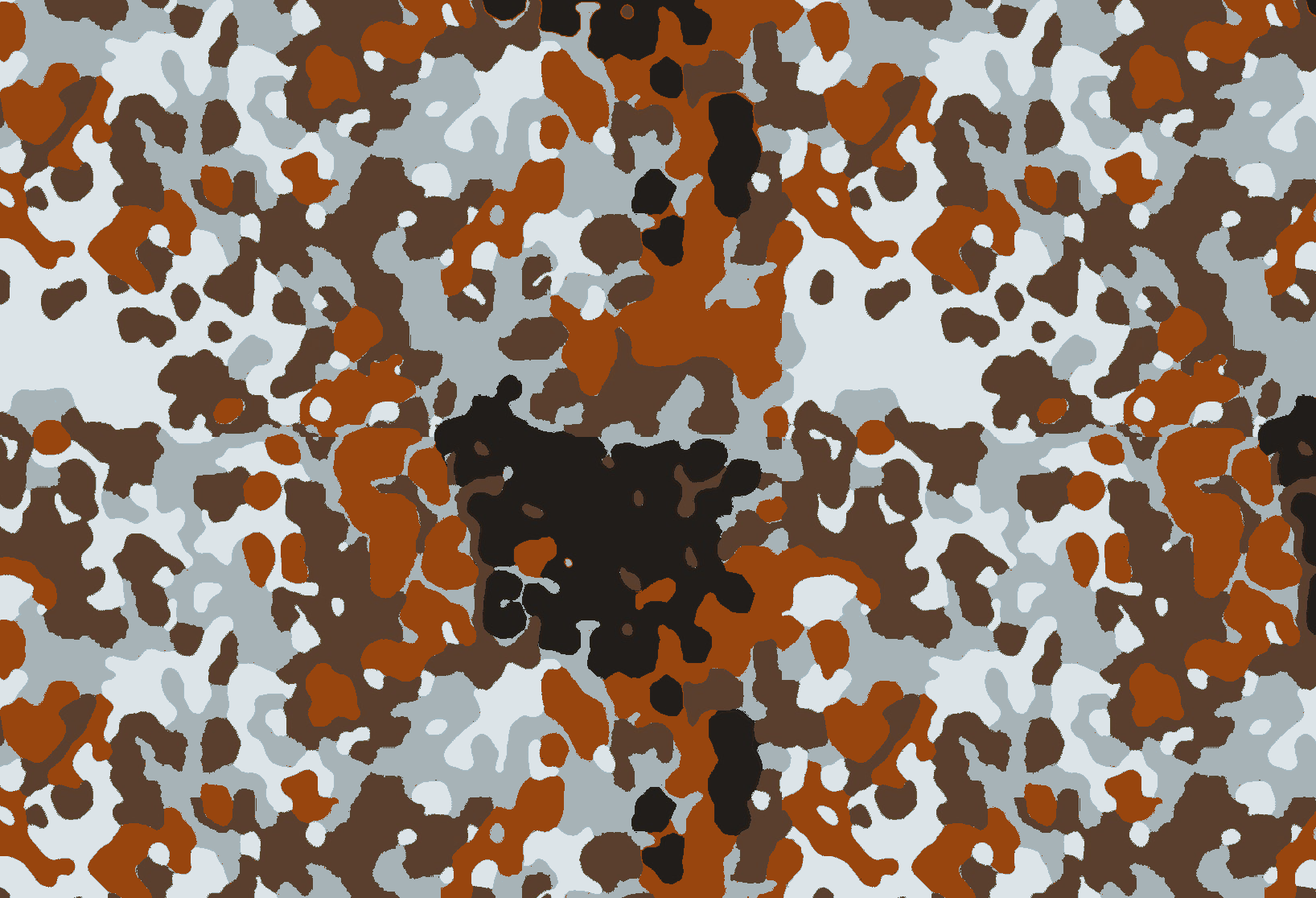
Chinese Tibetarn

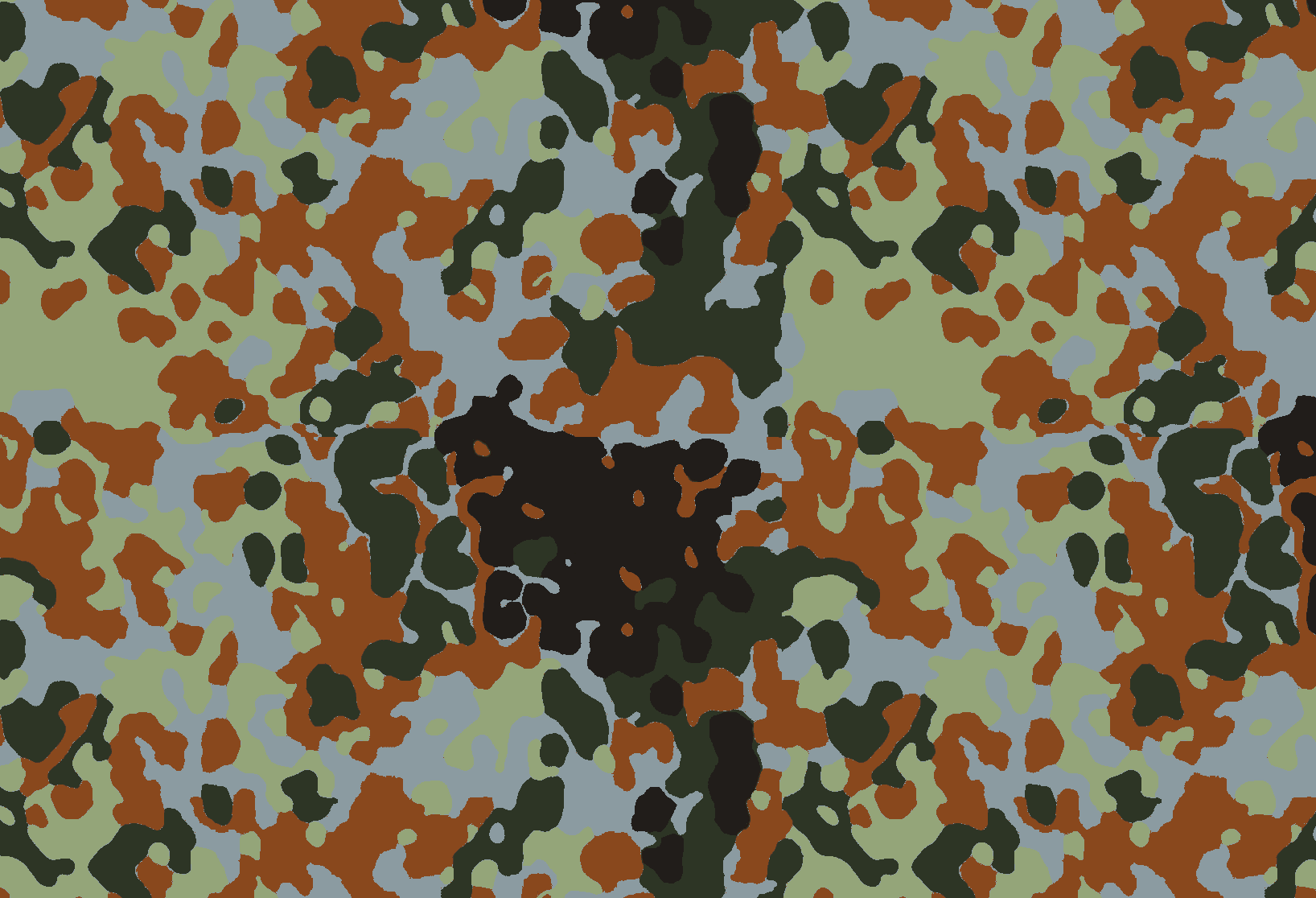
Belgian Flecktarn

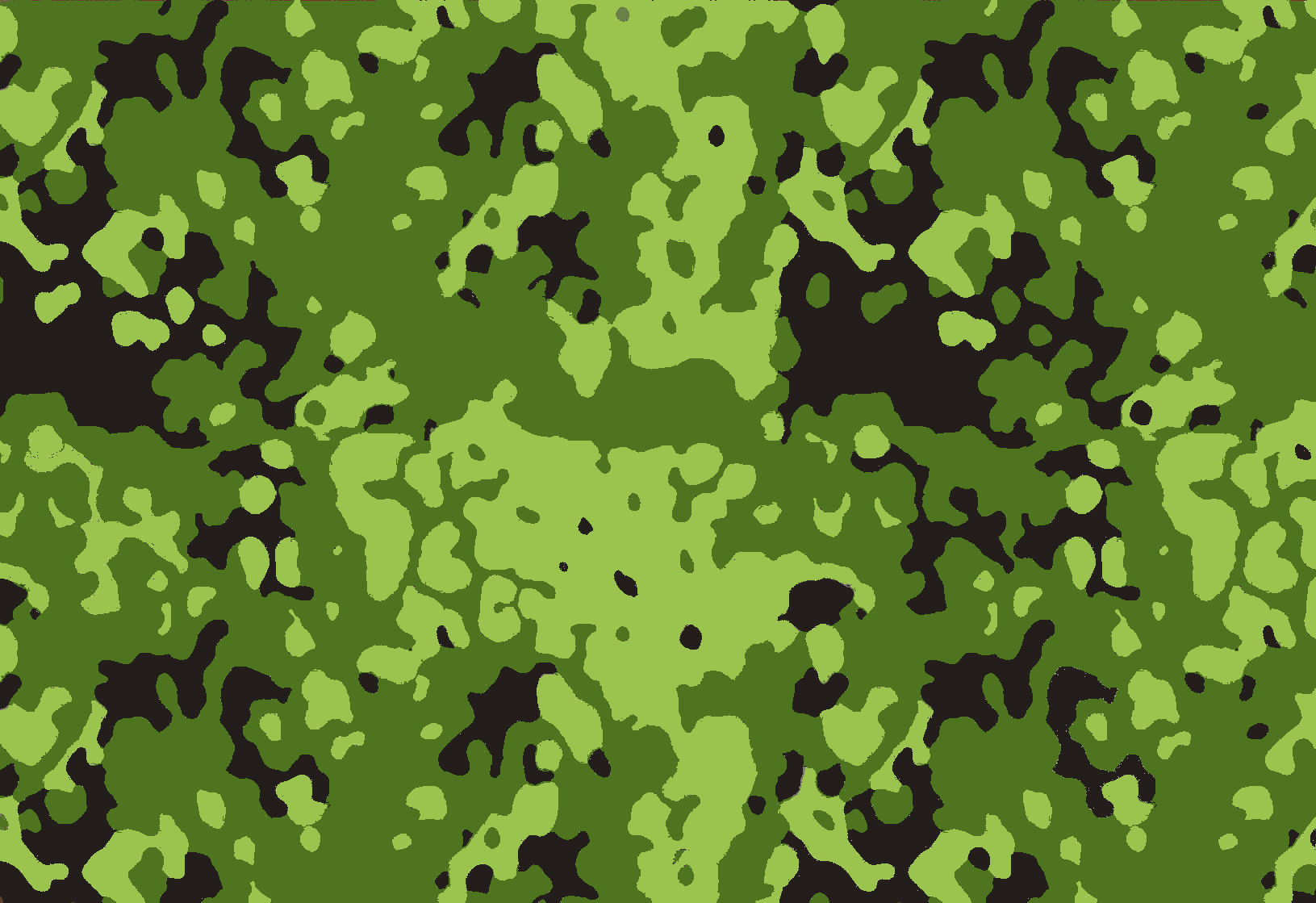
Danish M/84

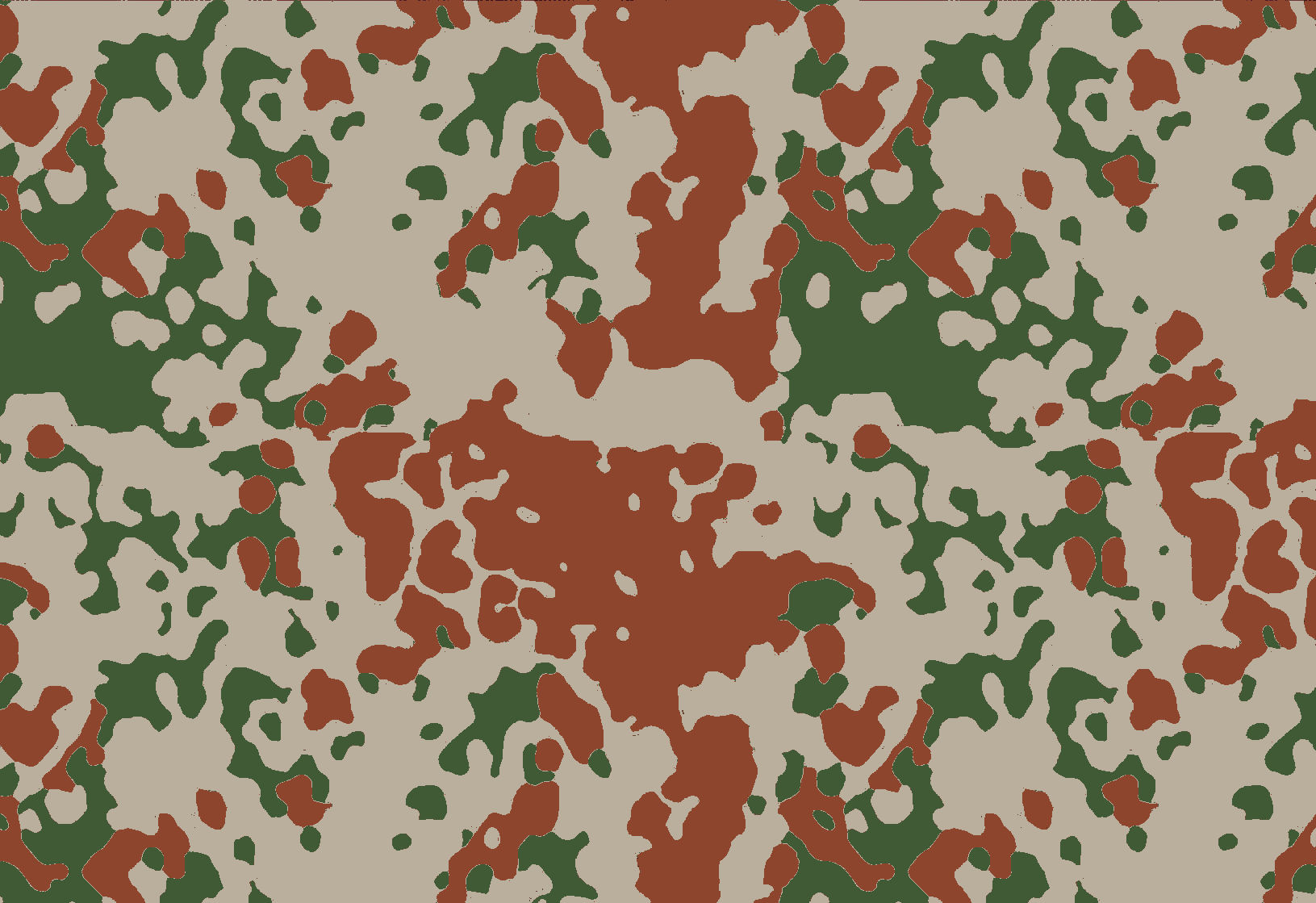
Danish M/01

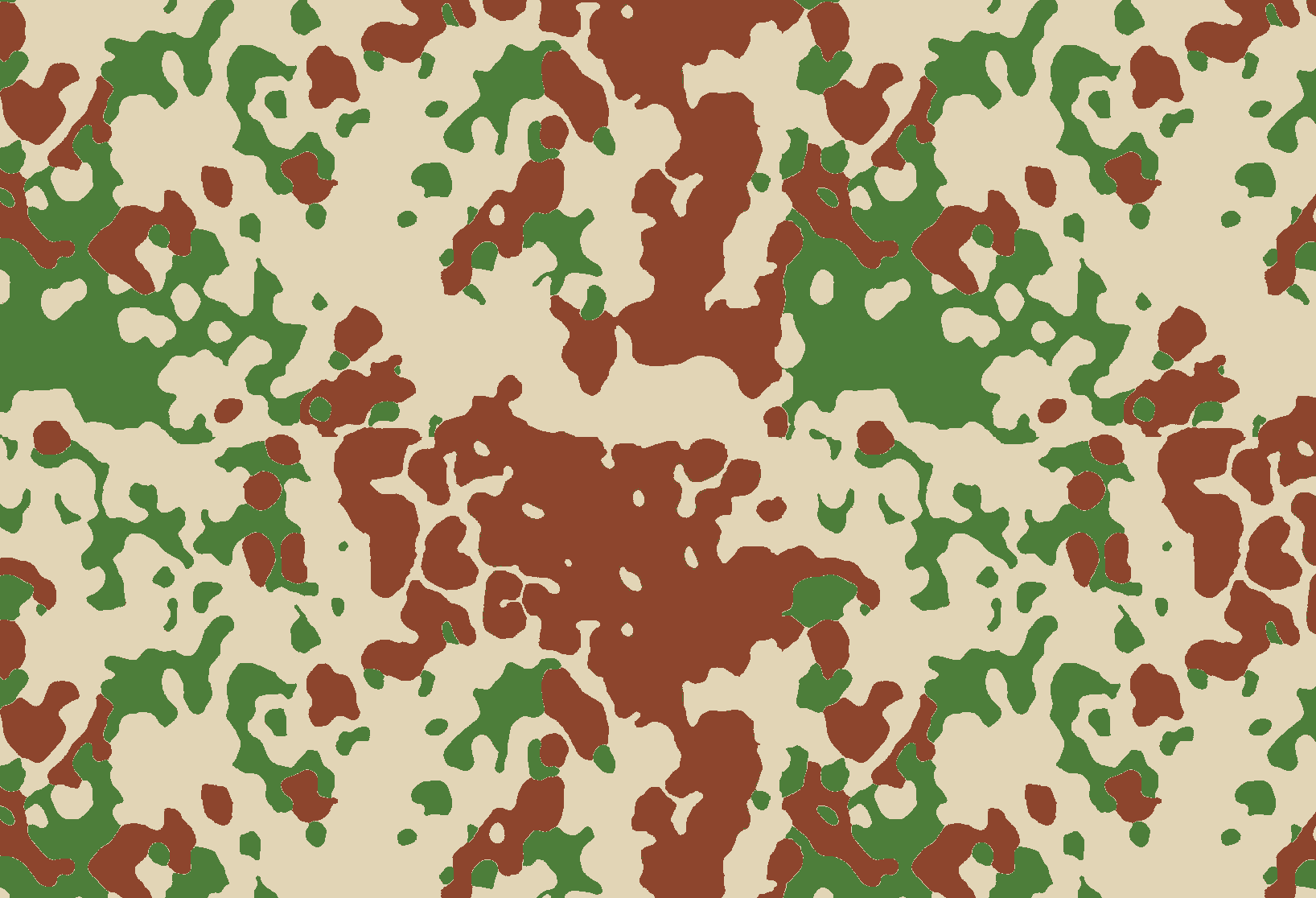
French Experimental Desert Flecktarn

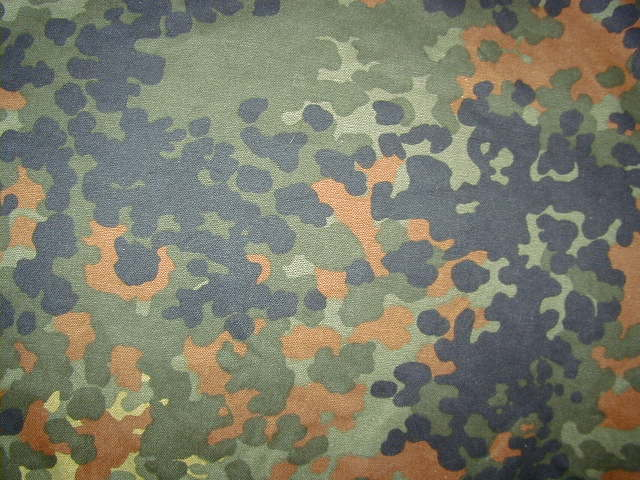
German Flecktarn

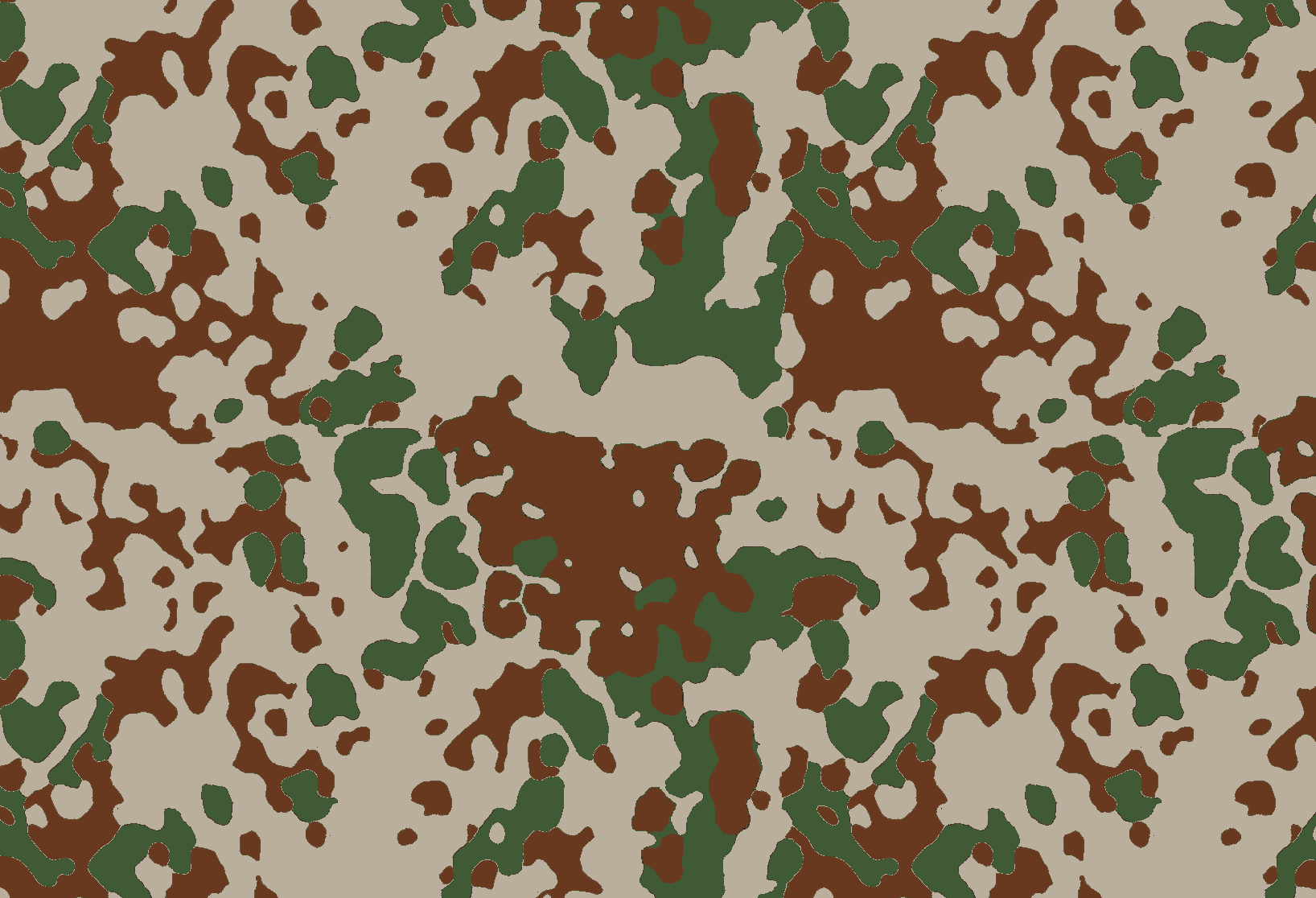
German Tropentarn

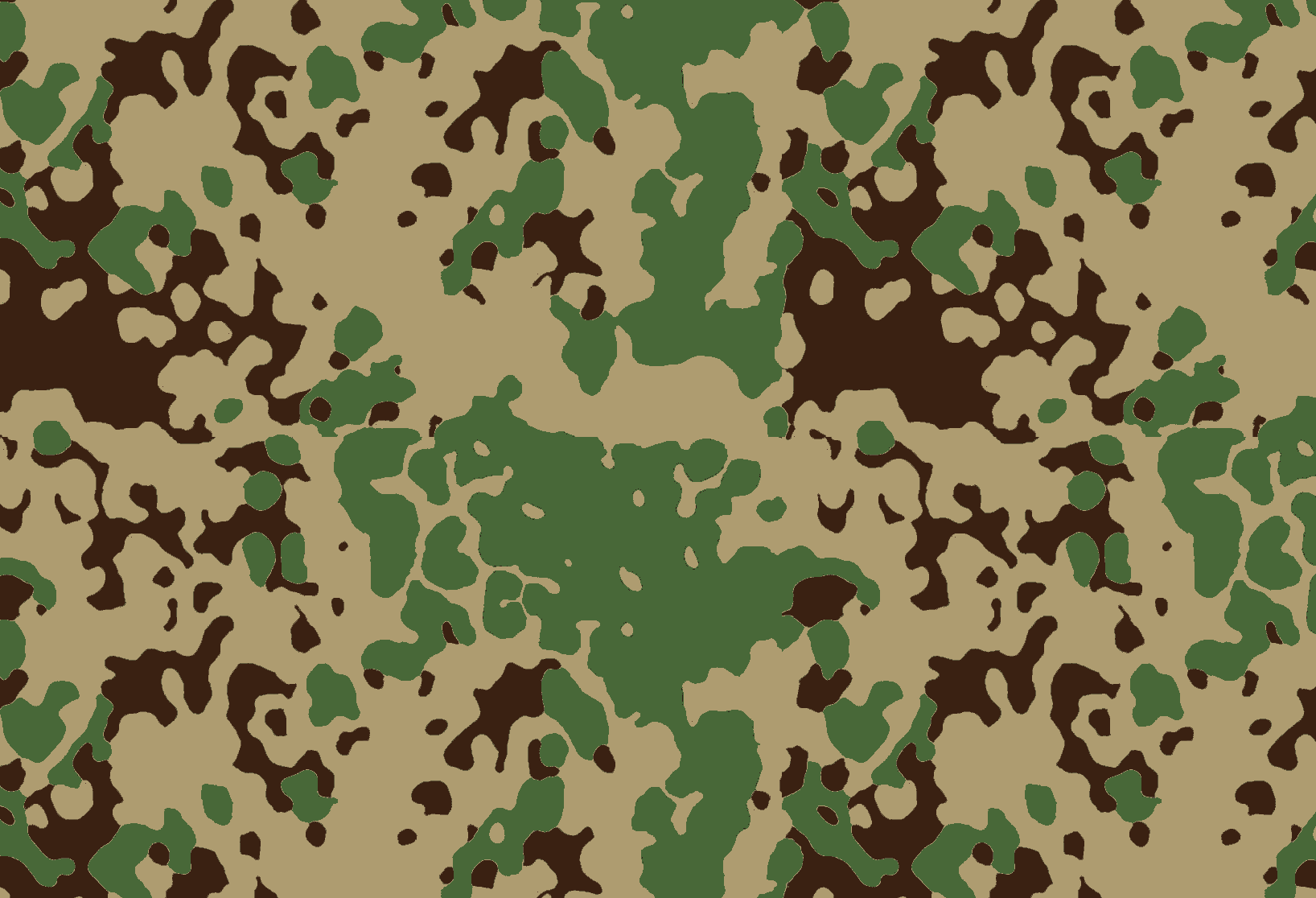
Indian Flecktarn

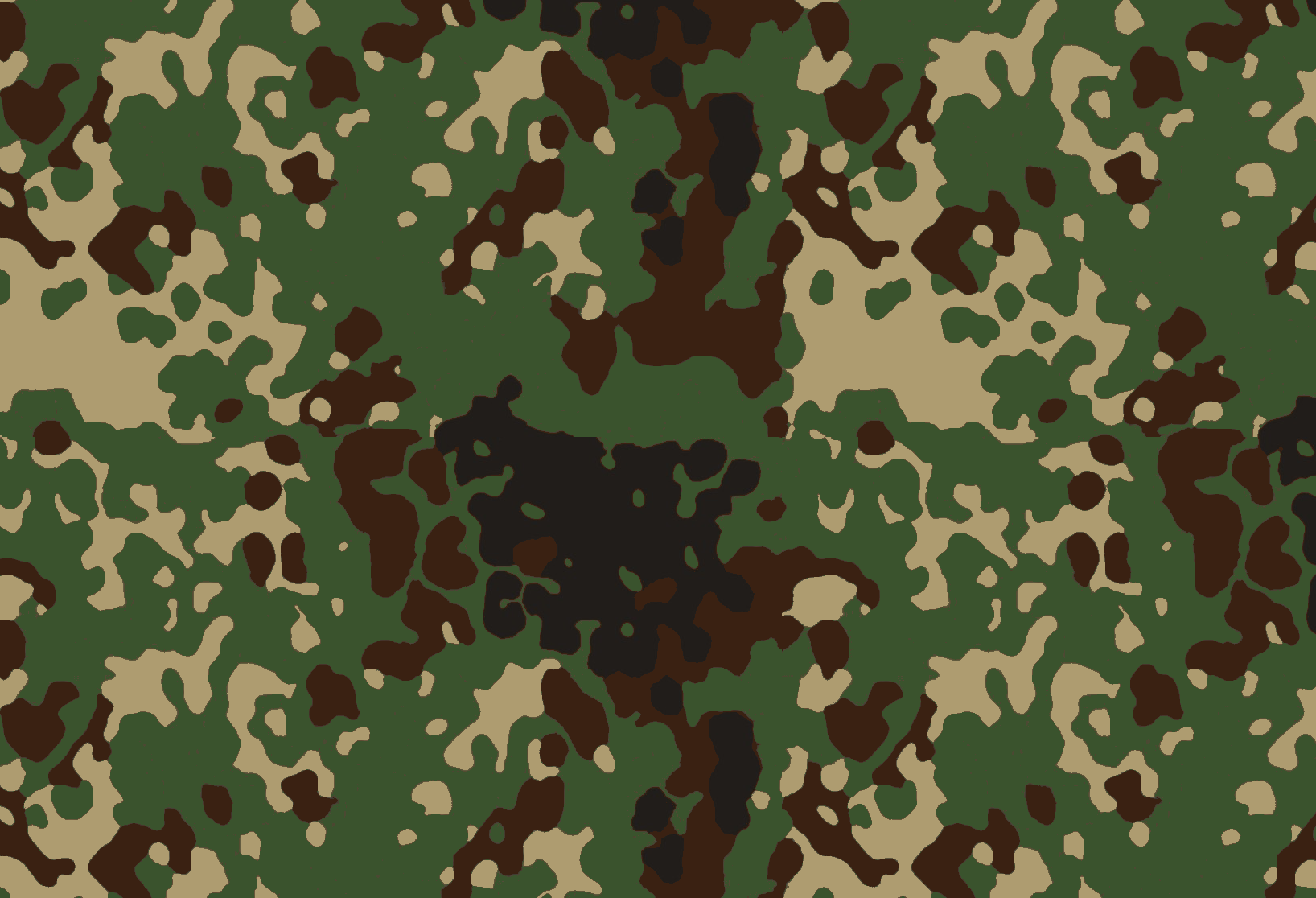
Japanese Jieitai

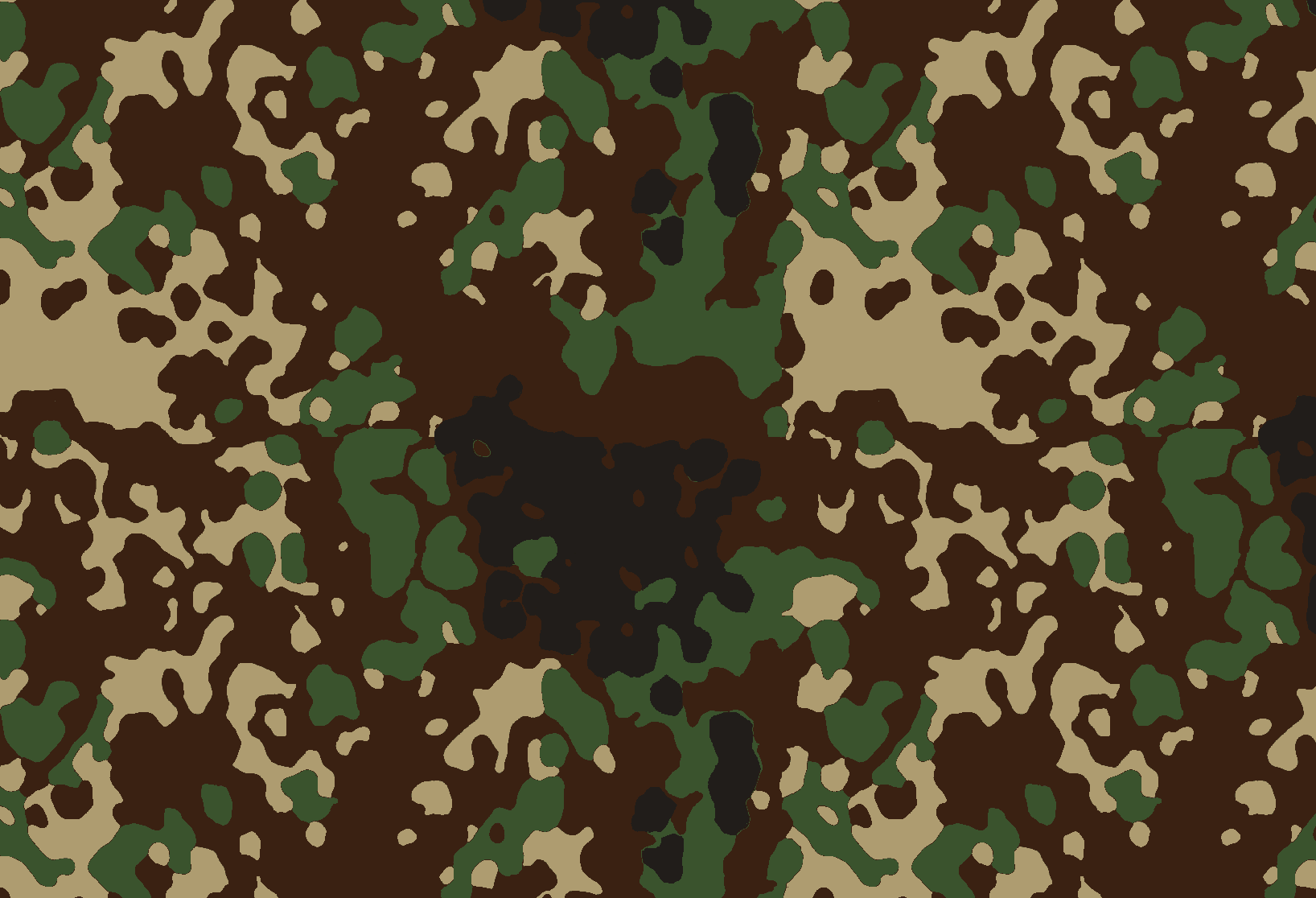
Japanese Winter Jieitai

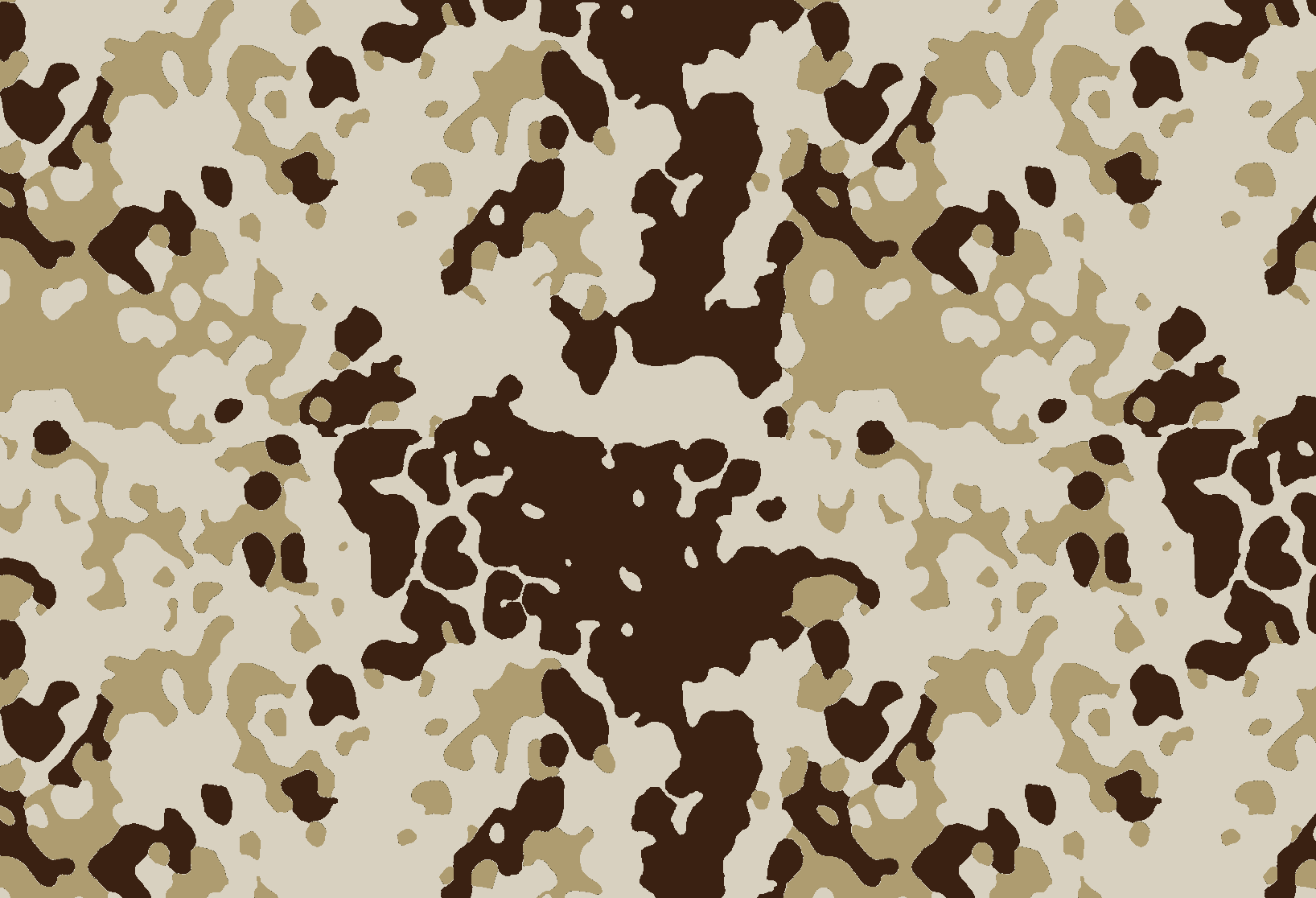
Japanese Desert Jieitai

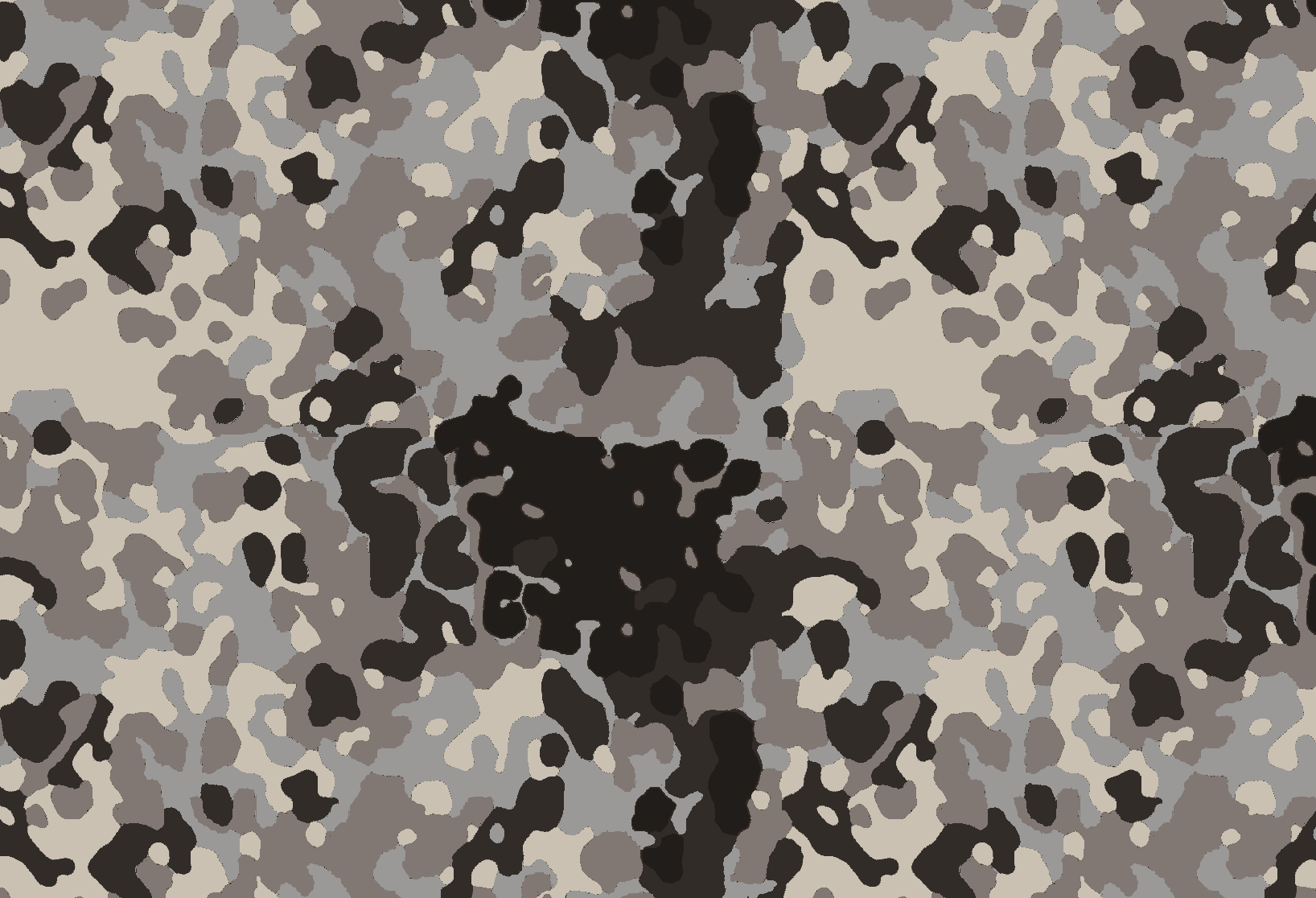
Polish Urban Flecktarn
wz AT 1 PLAMIAK

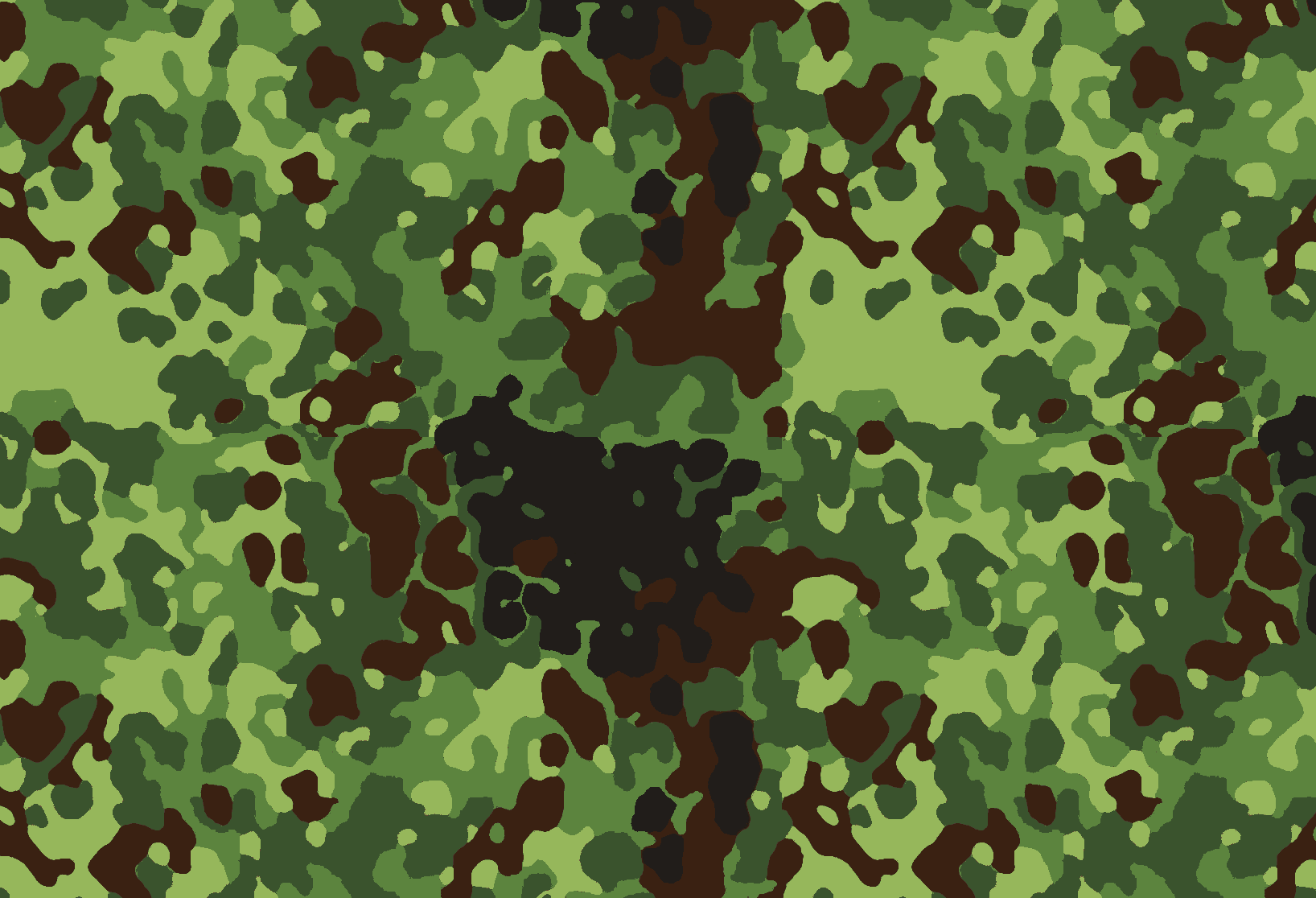
Polish Woodland Flecktarn
Gepard

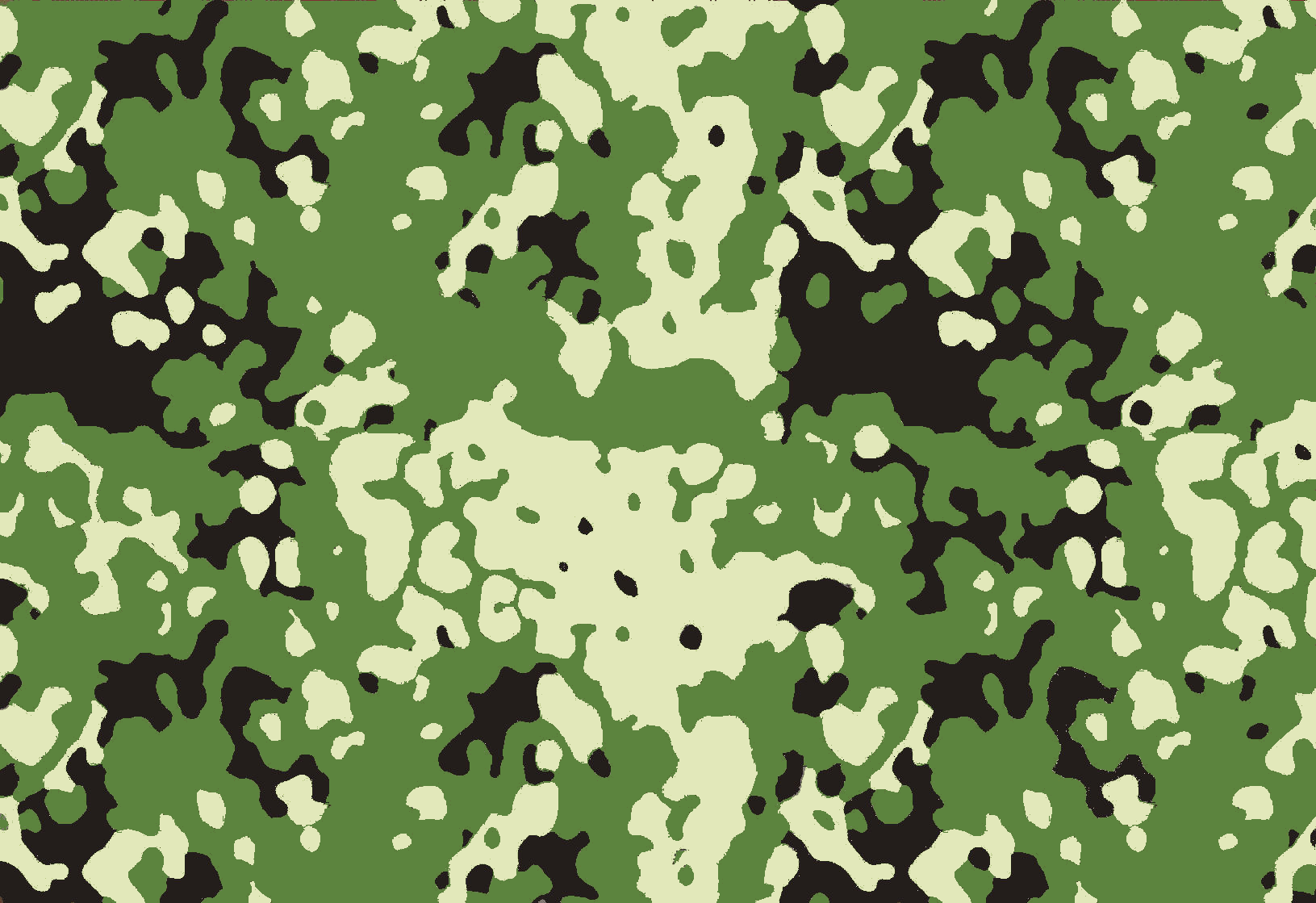
Russian Flectar-D

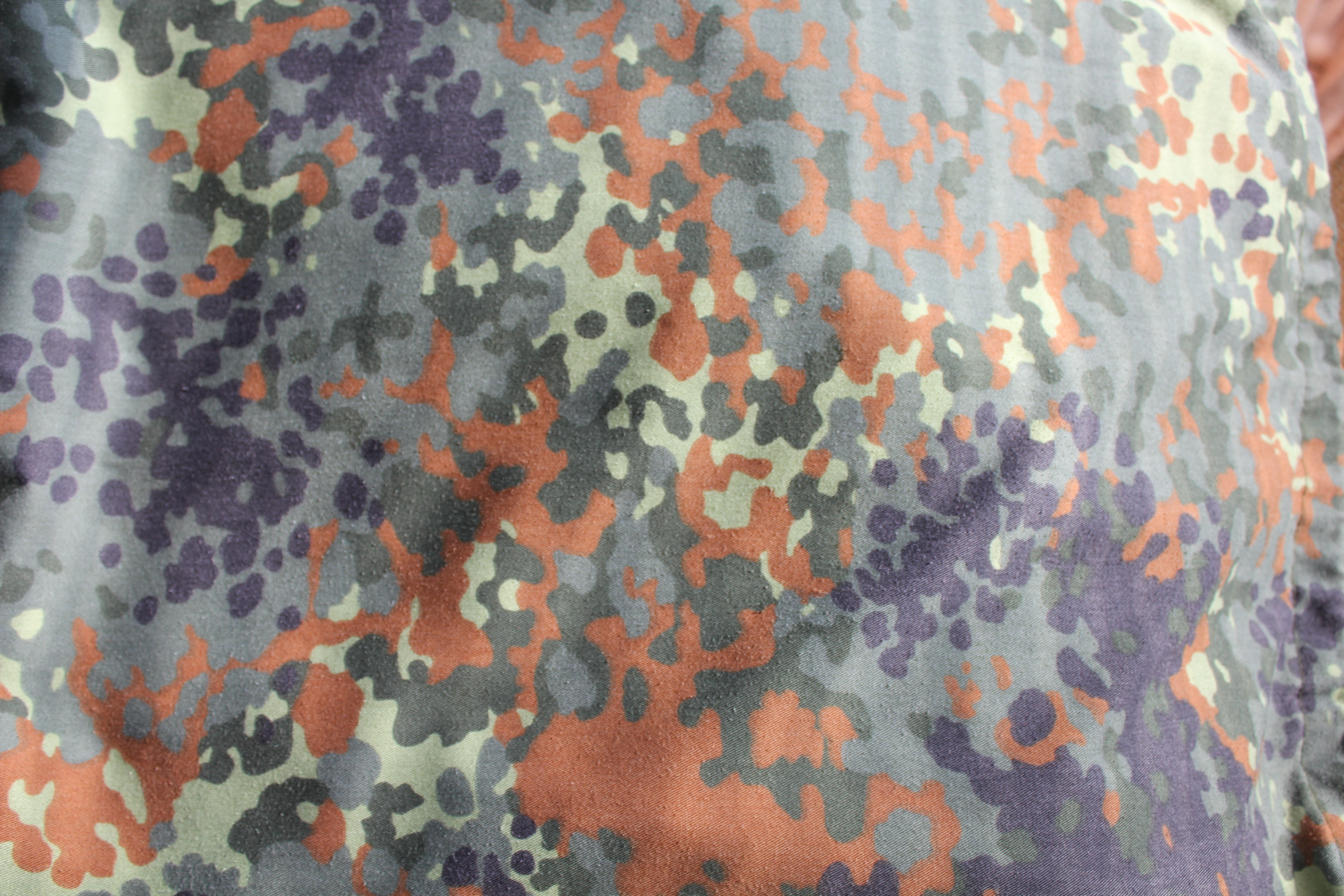
Chinese commercial "German Woodland"

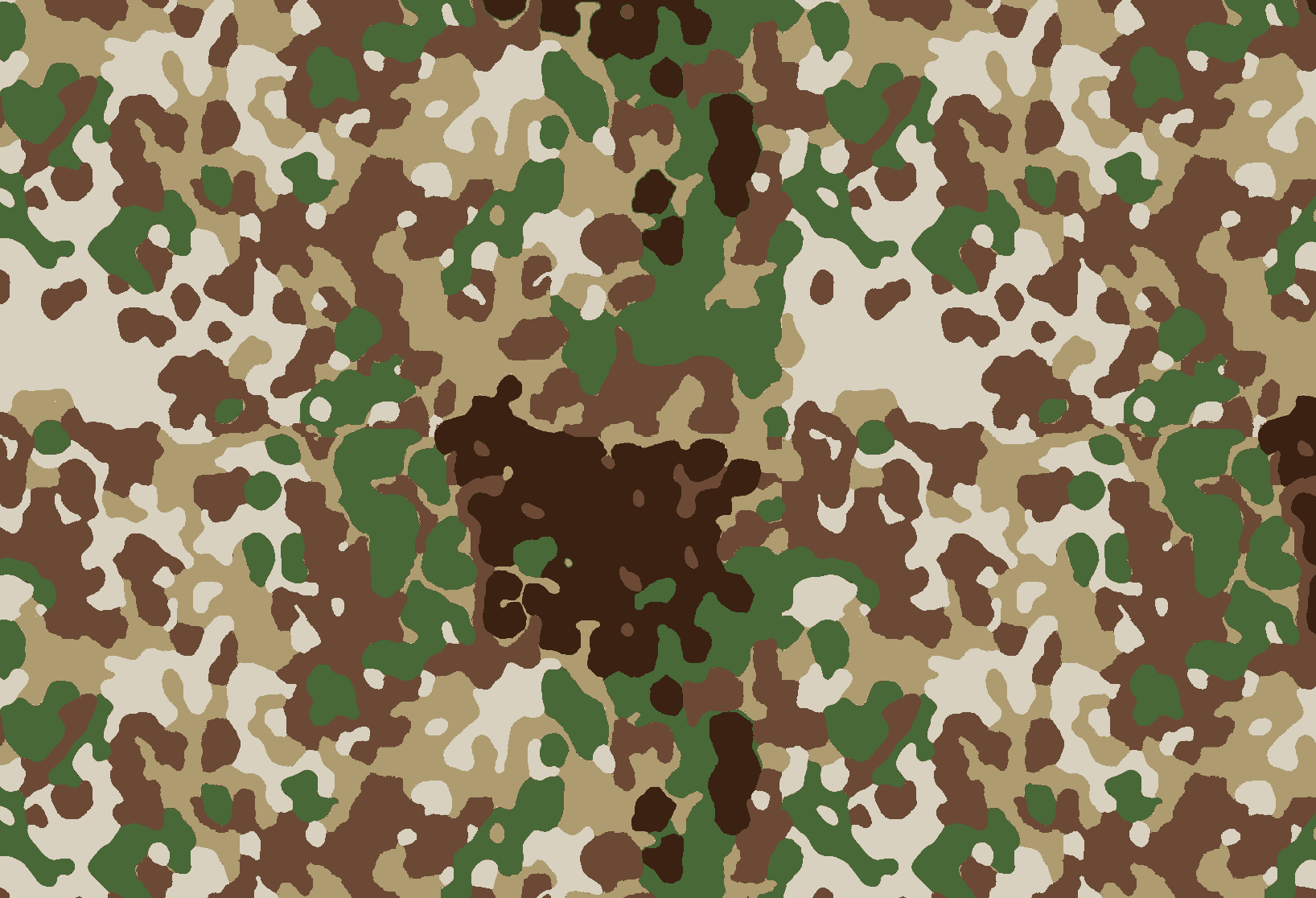
Commercial Arid Flecktarn

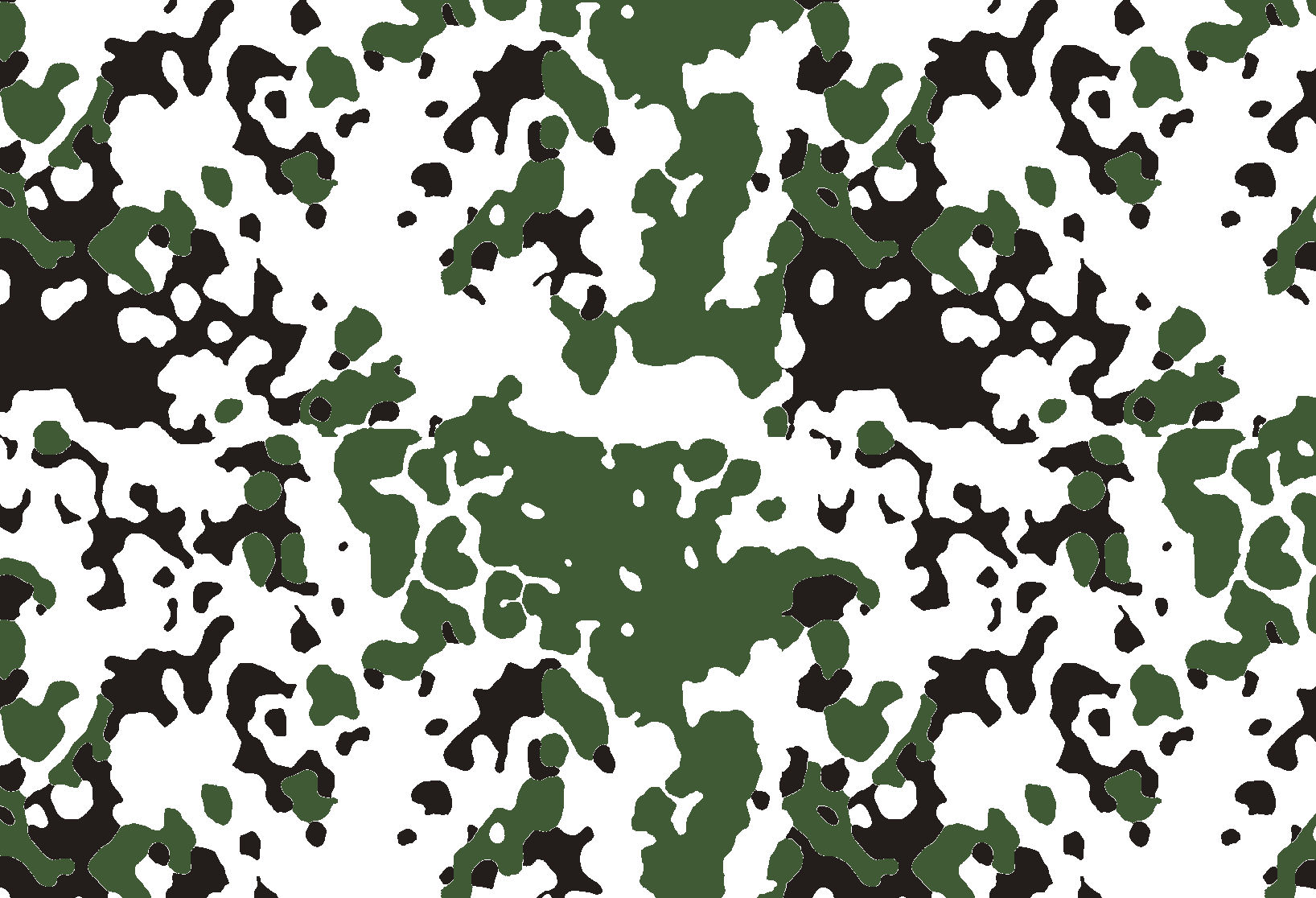
Commercial Schneetarn snow camouflage

== Users ==
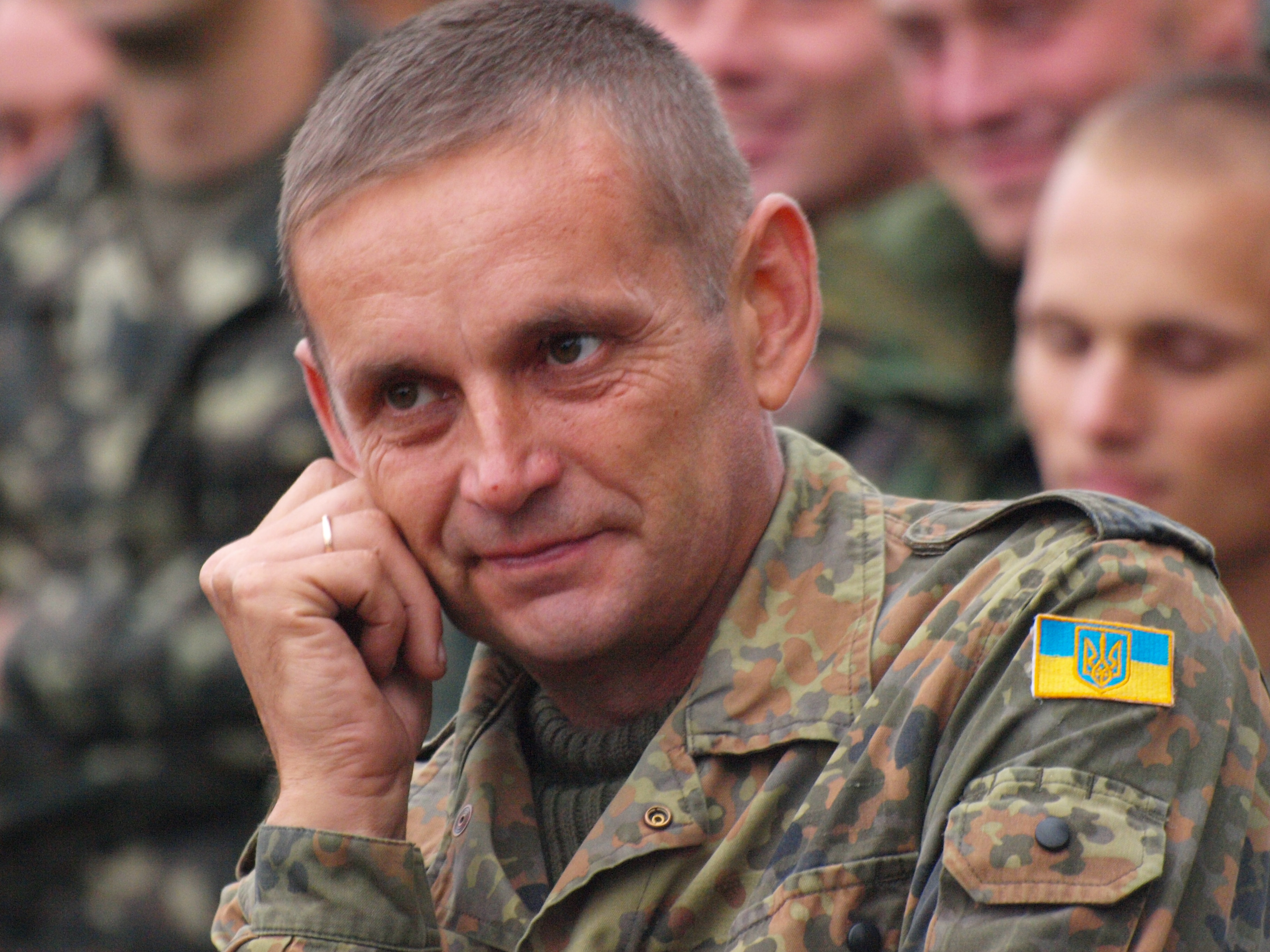
Ukrainian National Guard in 2015 wearing Bundeswehr military surplus

- Austria: Used by EKO Cobra as helmet covers for their Ulbrichts AM-95 helmets.
- Azerbaijan: Desert Flecktarn used.
- Belgium: Flecktarn used by Belgian airbase security forces and was dropped in 2000.
- China: Clones made for PLA soldiers conducting training and border defense duties.
- Germany: Used by Bundeswehr.
- Georgia: Some used with Georgian troops in KFOR.
- Kyrgyzstan: Asian variants used by Kyrgyz troops.
- Ukraine: Used by some divisions of the Armed Forces of Ukraine from special forces to airborne units, including the Azov Regiment.

=== Non-state actors ===
- Atomwaffen Division
- Kosovo Liberation Army
- Republican Resistance or Óglaigh na hÉireann (ÓnaÉ)
- Donetsk People's Republic

== Bibliography ==
- Crowther, Edward (2022). War in Ukraine: Volume 1: Armed Formations of the Donetsk People's Republic, 2014–2022. Helion and Company. ISBN 978-1915070661.
- Dougherty, Martin (2017). Camouflage at War: An Illustrated Guide from 1914 to the Present Day. London: Amber Books. ISBN 978-1782744986.
- Galeotti, Mark (2019). Armies of Russia's War in Ukraine. Osprey Publishing. ISBN 978-1472833440.
- Larson, Eric H. (2021). Camouflage: International Ground Force Patterns, 1946–2017. Barnsley: Pen & Sword. ISBN 9781526739537.
- Neville, Leigh (2017). European Counter-Terrorist Units 1972–2017. Oxford: Osprey Publishing. ISBN 978-1472825278.
