= Tropentarn =

Camouflage pattern used by the Bundeswehr

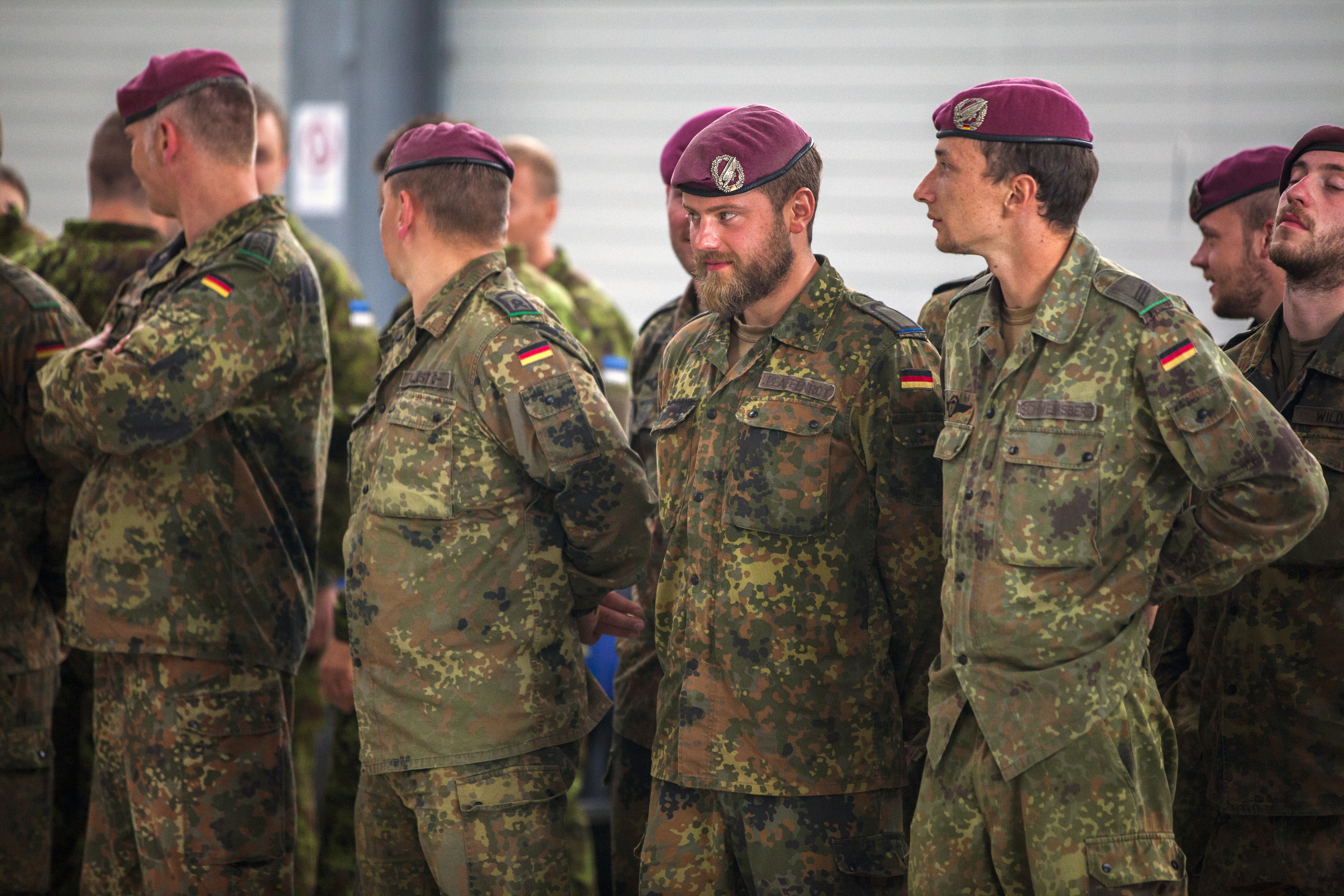
- Tropentarn camo pattern
- Type: Military camouflage pattern
- Place of origin: Germany

Service history
- Used by: See Users
- Wars: War in Afghanistan; Mali War

Tropentarn ("tropical camouflage") is the name of a lighter weight polyester-cotton (PolyCo) fabric printed with either the German 5-color or 3-color Flecktarn camouflage or pattern used by the Bundeswehr for their military uniforms. Some tags say 20% polyester, some say 15%, and others say 35%.

== Pattern ==
=== Design ===
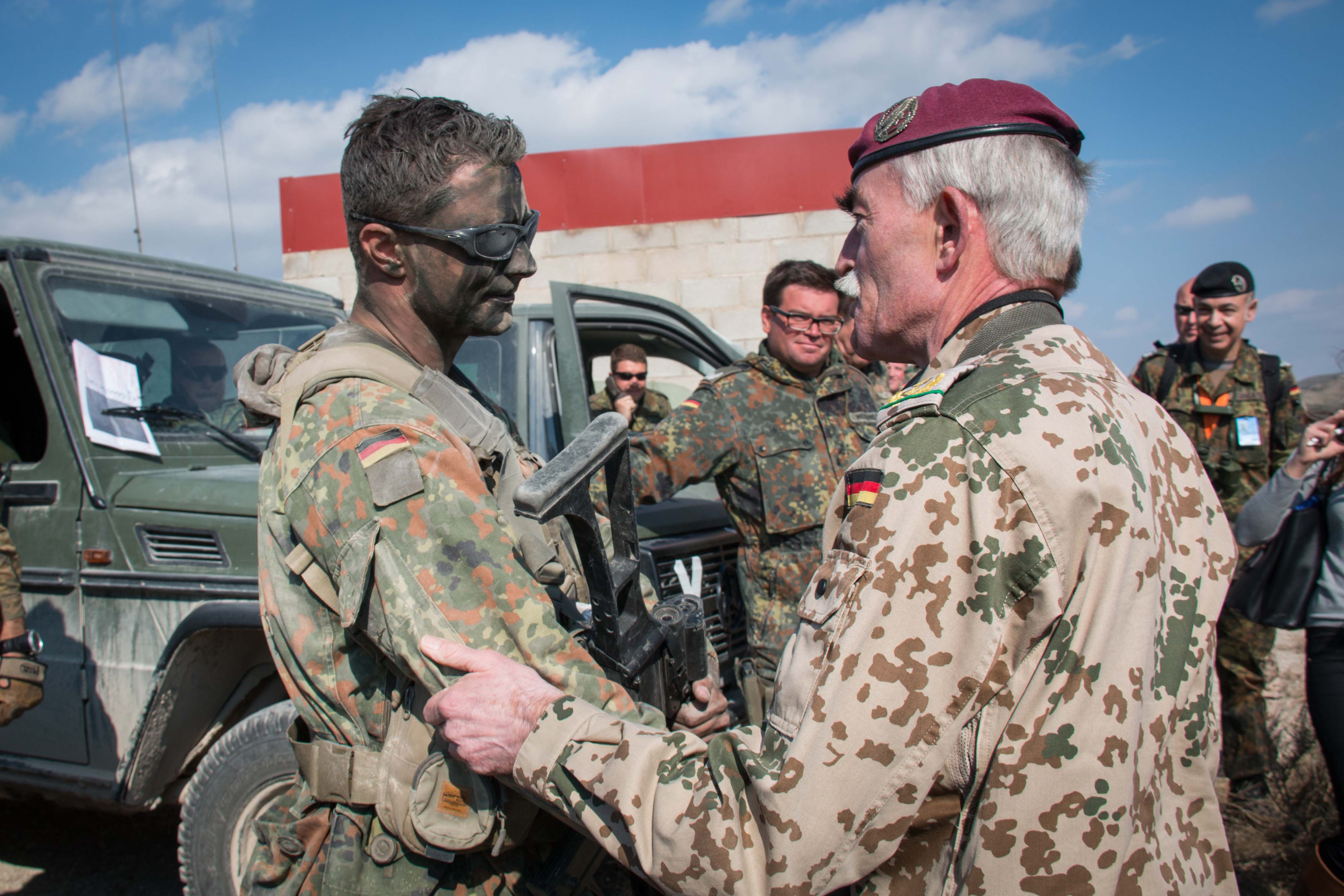
Soldier on the left is wearing Tropentarn. Soldier on the right is wearing Wüstentarn

Tropentarn is Bundeswehr 5-color or 3-colorFlecktarn printed on lighter weight fabric. Colors consist of dark green, grey-green, red brown, and black over a light green or tan base for 5-color and a beige base with brown and green colors on top. On the tropentarn fabric the brown screen is more of a "rust" color and the black screen contrasts sharply against the dark green and grey-green screens.

The term Wüstentarn and Tropentarn are often used for the 3-color Flecktarn. The first misnomer is due to the use of the 3-colour print in Afghanistans mostly sandy regions, while the former is due to it exclusively being used with the tropical uniform.

=== Manufacture ===
Uniforms made in this fabric are for service in warmer, tropical regions. Because of the nature of the material, the colorway of the Flecktarn pattern differs from the colorway of the heavier weight Flecktarn uniforms, appearing lighter, brighter and with greater screen separation.
