= Military history of Germany =

The military history of Germany spans the period from ancient times to the present.

== Ancient times ==
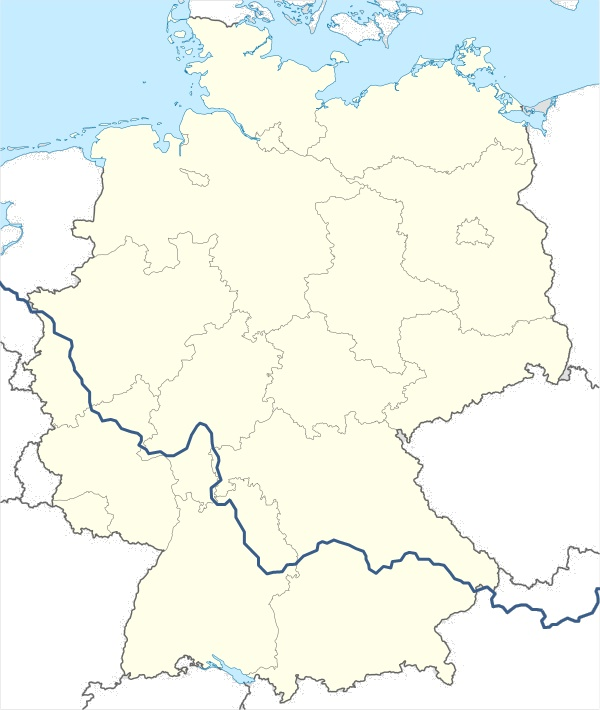
Roman limes and modern boundaries

During the ancient and early medieval periods the Germanic tribes had no written language. What we know about their early military history comes from accounts written in Latin and from archaeology. This leaves important gaps. Germanic wars against the ancient Rome are fairly well documented from the Roman perspective, such as the Battle of the Teutoburg Forest. Germanic wars against the early Celts remain mysterious because neither side recorded the events.

Germanic tribes are thought to have originated during the Jastorf culture in Iron Age in northern Germany and Denmark, their land was later called "Germania" by the Romans. The tribes spread south, possibly motivated by the deteriorating climate of that area. They crossed the River Elbe, probably overrunning the territories of the Celtic Volcae in the Weser Basin. The Romans recorded one of these early migrations when the Cimbri and the Teutons tribes threatened the Republic itself around the late 2nd century BC. In the East, other tribes, such as Goths, Rugii and Vandals, settled along the shores of the Baltic Sea pushing southward and eventually settling as far away as Ukraine. The Angles and Saxons migrated to England. The Germanic peoples often had a fraught relationship with their neighbours, leading to a period of over two millennia of military conflict over various territorial, religious, ideological and economic concerns.

== Middle Ages ==
The Holy Roman Empire of the German Nation (also referred as the First German Empire) emerged from the kingdom in the eastern part of Francia called Carolingian Empire at the time (first polity of Germany) in 962 after its division between the grandchildren of Charlemagne in the Treaty of Verdun of 843, and lasted almost a millennium until its dissolution in 1806. It was never a unitary state; from the beginning it was made up of many ethnicities and languages and would at its height comprise territories ranging from eastern France to northern Italy. Its unifying characteristic was its Carolingian heritage and strong religious connotations, its claim to "German-ness" the ethnicity of most of its subjects and rulers.

The military history of Germany during the Middle Ages was full of siege warfare and the technological changes that come from fighting that kind of war. From the creation of the First German Empire in 843 until the creation of the printing press by Johannes Gutenberg, the middles ages were fought in similar fashion to those of ancient times. Many changes were made due to the use of siege warfare and new military technologies.

=== Siege warfare ===
During the Middle Ages, siege warfare was the primary way in which war was fought and territory taken through conquest. There were field battles fought, in which they employed a phalanx formation similar to what would have been studied in Vegetius' De re militari. However, the vast majority of battles were fought in defense of or the attempt to take fortifications. The men required to partake in a siege came from different areas of society. There were some nobles, some knights, the king's personal men, as well as the vast majority being peasant farmers conscripted into fighting. Siege warfare in effect was the way in which war was fought in Germany during the Middle Ages; this led to advances in medieval military technology.

=== Military technology ===
With the use of sieges as the primary means of middle age warfare, there were changes in military technology that facilitated fighting this differing kind of warfare. That being said, advances in technology did not mean that old technology became immediately obsolete. One such advance was the trebuchet, but other smaller advancements were made as well. There were advancements such as new helmets called Spangenhelme as well as some Carolingian developments in weapon production. With the subsequent development in armor, there came advancements in handheld weaponry to deal with these developments. For example, swords became thinner and pointed on the tip in order to penetrate between gaps in plate armor. Crossbows as well became more commonly used in the defense of castles during siege warfare. In order to attack castles, the Springald was created to launch spears in succession, but was mainly used outside of Germany. Stirrups were developed which was integral in the use of shock combat during the Middle Ages. The creation of greaves was important in protecting the shins.

=== The reality of knighthood ===
In Germany, Baronets were known as (Ritter) or Knights. These were a title of nobility bestowed on people by the local lord. Following this, the title of Ritter was generally passed in a hereditary fashion until the end of the noble line. After which, the title and its holdings would revert to the lord to give out to someone else. Ritter's were considered the elite of the German military as their entire goal was to practice for war. They did this by competing in tournaments to keep themselves practiced. A Ritter would be considered of this lowest nobility but were considered the primary means of defense for many lords. All knights were nobility but not all nobles were knights. The nobility were not a military class, but quite contrarily avoided military conflict on the basis of their immense wealth. As well, knights would have been more likely to ravage the countryside in order to get a country to submit to their authority, rather than seek open battle to prove their point.

=== Fortifications ===
Fortifications in Medieval Germany were built similarly to those of the Roman style, with the caveat of stone-built castles. Forts were generally well constructed and effective against attack. There were several kinds of fortifications such as the moat and bailey, earthworks, hill-forts, Urban forts, town walls, and fortified residences. Moat and bailey, the most common castles before the use of stonework's, proved ineffective against Viking invaders. In Germany, in 1200 there were only 12 towns with walls, and 9 of them were originally Roman walls. Later, crusaders built their own types of fortifications called crusader castles, meant to be used in defense of a strategic objective for Christendom. Mostly, the defense of territory gained in conquest against Muslims in the Holy Land. However, it's possible some could have been built in the Prussian Crusade in the 13th century. This all changed with the influence of gunpowder weapons as used during sieges.

=== Battle tactics ===
The tactics of the Middle Ages varied greatly. A large amount of tactics were still based on Roman ideas. Such as the use of training, regimentation, and the phalanx. Medieval commanders may have been educated or read in Vegetius' De Re Militari which would have provided the bases for battle tactics. In historiography, Charles Oman believes that cavalry entirely dominated the battlefield of the Middle Ages, but others contend that the infantry continued to play the most vital role even through the early modern age. One example of tactics and strategy is the use of secrecy in Henry II in 1004 against Bohemians, which gave Henry the element of surprise so that he was successful in his campaign. Another strategy, employed primarily by knights, was to ravage the countryside and force people to submit when they run out of supplies. The vast majority of these tactics were learned from Roman times in surviving works.

=== Ninth century ===
In the year 800, Charlemagne is crowned Holy Roman Emperor including his dominions in Germany which he gained through military conquest of Saxon tribes. Through the ninth Century, after the death of Charlemagne in 814, the empire was split in the Treaty of Verdun in 843. This created the kingdoms of France, Germany, and Lombardy.

Following the Treaty of Verdun, in 870 there was the Treaty of Meerssen. This treaty replaced the treaty of Verdun and split the empire again. The Kingdom of East Francia (Germany) continued to exist under the conditions of this treaty. However, within 10 years this led to further conflict between German and French Kings.

=== Tenth century ===
In July 907, an army of Germans faced off against Hungarians in the Battle of Pressburg. The result was a decisive Hungarian victory in which the Hungarians were able to pillage what is today modern eastern Germany. The following year in 908, the Hungarians scored another victory at the Battle of Eisenach and continued to ravage the German countryside and demand tribute from local lords. This trend was reversed with the First Battle of Lechfeld in 910 when the army led by Otto I. defeated the Hungarian invaders.

From 919–36, the Germanic peoples (Franks, Saxons, Swaben and Bavarians) were united under Henry the Fowler, then Duke of Saxony, who took the title of King. For the first time, the term Kingdom of the Germans ("Regnum Teutonicorum") was applied to East Francia.

The Treaty of Bonn was signed in 921 between Charles III of France and Henry I of Germany. They established the Rhine River as the border and neutral territory of their kingdoms. The treaty was ultimately a failure and led to tensions and military conflict between the kingdoms.

In 933, Henry the Fowler met with an assembly in which they expressed their desire to renew their war with the Magyars (Hungarians). The Magyars attempted to catch the Saxons by surprise, but ultimately failed when they split their army in two. This resulted in Henry destroying both army sections with his superior weapons and training. The name of this conflict was known as the Battle of Riade.

Henry I and his son Otto I inherited their administrative qualities from their Carolingian ancestors and thus were able to field armies much larger than medieval military historiography believed was capable at that time. The efficiency of military organization in tenth-century Germany was much higher than believable. This can be seen in the number of sieges, which would require extensive logistics, that were conducted during the century. Otto I and his subsequent descendants were tasked with defending the military borders to the east of modern-day Germany. Their enemies were primarily Slavic and roaming Steppe peoples.

In 953-954 Otto the Great was forced to fight his sons Conrad the Red and Luidolf in a civil war in modern-day Germany. The war was fought over old Roman fortifications such as Mainz and Regensburg. In the subsequent year, during which the Ottonian kingdom would've been weaker, the Magyars invaded with the objective of besieging cities in search of booty. The number of forts and their organization also pointed to extensive work done by the first kings of Germany during the 10th century during the Middle Ages.

In 955, the Magyars were decisively defeated at the second battle of Lechfeld by Otto the Great, ending the threat from the Eurasian steppes for four centuries. In 962, partly on the strength of this victory, Otto invaded Italy on his way to Rome and was crowned the first Emperor of the Holy Roman Empire by the pope.

The War of the Three Henries was fought between 977–978. The war was a short lived rebellion by three German princes, all of which were named Henry, against Emperor Otto II. The three Henries were, Bishop Henry I of Augsburg, Henry the Wrangler, and duke Henry I the Younger. Shortly after the end of the rebellion of the three Henries, Otto fought a brief war with King Lothair of France, who invaded Lotharingia and attacked the imperial city of Aachen with 20,000 men. Otto was forced to flee to Dortmund where he created an effective response. He then counter-invaded France and laid siege to Paris but was forced to withdraw during the winter months. He then turned to defeating the rebellious princes, which he did by besieging Passau where the rebels had gathered. Otto took Passau and punished the three princes for their insurrection.

=== Eleventh century ===
Between 1002 and 1024, Henry II of Germany was able to conscript forces across his entire kingdom for a campaign south of the Alps into Italy. As was common in previous centuries, all able-bodied men in the Holy Roman Empire were required to defend their home if it was under threat.

Germany during the eleventh century was engulfed in civil war most notably in the 1070s and 1080s. It began during the reign of Henry IV in 1056. During the civil War, Henry IV found time to siege Rome twice in 1081 and 1084. The struggle of the civil war broke German military and political power so that later the kingdom and empire would dissolve into hundreds of autonomous states for some time.

=== Twelfth century ===
By 1155, the German states had descended into disorder. Emperor Frederick I Barbarossa managed to restore peace through diplomacy and skillfully arranged marriages. He claimed direct imperial control over Italy and made several incursions into northern Italy, but was ultimately defeated by the Lombard League at Legano in 1176. Despite his defeat, he did manage to receive the imperial coronation from the pope, thus aiding Barbarossa in his efforts to restore the empire to its former glory that it experienced under Otto I. In 1189, Frederick embarked on the Third Crusade. After a few initial successes against the Turks, notably at the Battle of Iconium, Frederick died when trying to cross a river. Leaderless, panicked and attacked on all sides, only a tiny fraction of the original forces continued onward.

Towards the end of the twelfth century in 1198, there was the beginning of the German Throne Dispute. Henry VI died unexpectedly and there was a succession crisis. The direction of the empire was under scrutiny and was altered by the princes of the empire. The result was a conflict that lasted almost 17 years before the son of Henry VI, Frederick II, was able to regain his title and power as Holy Roman Emperor.

=== Thirteenth century ===
Teutonic Knights

In 1226 Konrad I of Masovia appealed to the Teutonic Knights, a German crusading military order, to defend his borders and subdue the pagan Baltic Prussians. The conquest and Christianization of Prussia was accomplished after more than 50 years, after which the Order ruled it as a sovereign Teutonic Order state. Their conflict of interests with the Polish-Lithuanian state lead in 1410 to Battle of Grunwald (Tannenberg) where a Polish-Lithuanian army inflicted a decisive defeat and broke its military power, although the Order withstood the following Siege of Marienburg and managed to retain most of its territories.

In 1212, Emperor Frederick was forced to fight a civil war to defend his title. He defended his title and owed the Pope for acknowledging him and helping him retain his title. For this, Emperor Frederick passed the Golden Bull of Eger in which he made concessions to the church.

In 1244, the war of Flemish Succession broke out with two counties, one German and one French, arguing over who was to succeed Margaret II, Countess of Flanders. The conflict was between half-brothers, both of whose mother was the aforementioned Margaret, John I of Avesnes and Guy of Dampierre. The result of the war was John I of Avesnes defeating his mother and half brother with the aid of Count William of Holland.

The Teltow-Magdeburg Wars were fought in the modern German state of Brandenburg. It was fought between 1239 and 1245 over the ownership of some eastern German territories. The war was between princes of the Holy Roman Empire. The result was that Otto the Pious and John I of Brandenburg (Brothers who jointly ruled Brandenburg) expanded their holdings in eastern Germany. Following their conquest, the brothers would later go on to help the Teutonic Order defeat a Prussian uprising in the middle of the 1260s.

In 1260, there was a small uprising in the town of Hamelin. The townsfolk rose up in response to a threat by the Bishop of Minden. The Battle took place at the abandoned village of Sedemuender. The result was the total defeat of the townsfolk.

=== Fourteenth century ===
In 1311, Reichskrieg, (Imperial War) a war between the Holy Roman Empire and the Count of Württemberg broke out. The Count, Eberhard, was upset that the imperial Ban was placed on him for the way he handles a court case and crisis around his duties as Landvogt (Military Protector).

In 1361, a war between the Hanseatic League and the Danes broke out. The Hanseatic League won when they conquered Copenhagen. The war lasted nine years and resulted in the Treaty of Stralsund.

In 1393, the "Vitalienbrüder", or the "Victual Brothers" harassed the Hansa and other ships on the Baltic and North Seas. The pirates were brutal and by 1393 the only way for cargo ships to travel was in convoys. The Hansa built some defensive ships but nothing that could completely wipe of the brothers like they had hoped. It was the master of the Teutonic Knights, Konrad von Jungingen that besieged and conquered the Vitalienbrüder base at Gotland that finally ended their reign of terror as the remainder of the pirates were forced to move into other seas.

=== Fifteenth century ===
In 1410, the Teutonic Order or (Deutscher Ordensstaat) in German, situated in modern-day Poland, was dealt a defeat by the Polish-Lithuanian forces by King Władysław II Jagiełło. This marked an ending to the power of the German religious state in eastern Europe.

=== Hussite wars ===
The Hussite Wars, fought between 1419 and 1434 in Bohemia, had their origins in a conflict between Catholics and the followers of a religious sect founded by Jan Hus. The inciting action of the war was the First Defenestration of Prague, in which the mayor and the town council members of Prague were thrown from the windows of the town building. Emperor Sigismund, a firm adherent of the Roman Catholic Church, obtained the support of Pope Martin V who issued a papal bull in 1420 proclaiming a crusade. In all, four crusades were launched against the heretics, all resulting in defeat for the Catholic troops. The Hussites, capably led by Jan Žižka, employed novel tactics to defeat their numerically superior enemies, decisively at Aussig. Whenever a crusade would end, the Hussite armies go on "Beautiful Rides" and would invade the lands where the crusaders were from. One such place was Saxony. After Žižka's death in 1424, the Hussite armies were led by Prokop the Great to another victory at the Battle of Tachov in 1427. The Hussites repeatedly invaded central German lands, though they made no attempt at permanent occupation, and at one point made it all of the way to the Baltic Sea. The Hussite movement was ended in 1434, however, at the Battle of Lipany.

Historiography tends to believe that the Middle Ages end in 1453 with the emergence of the printing press in Mainz; thus, beginning the early modern age of Germany, and more broadly the early modern European age.

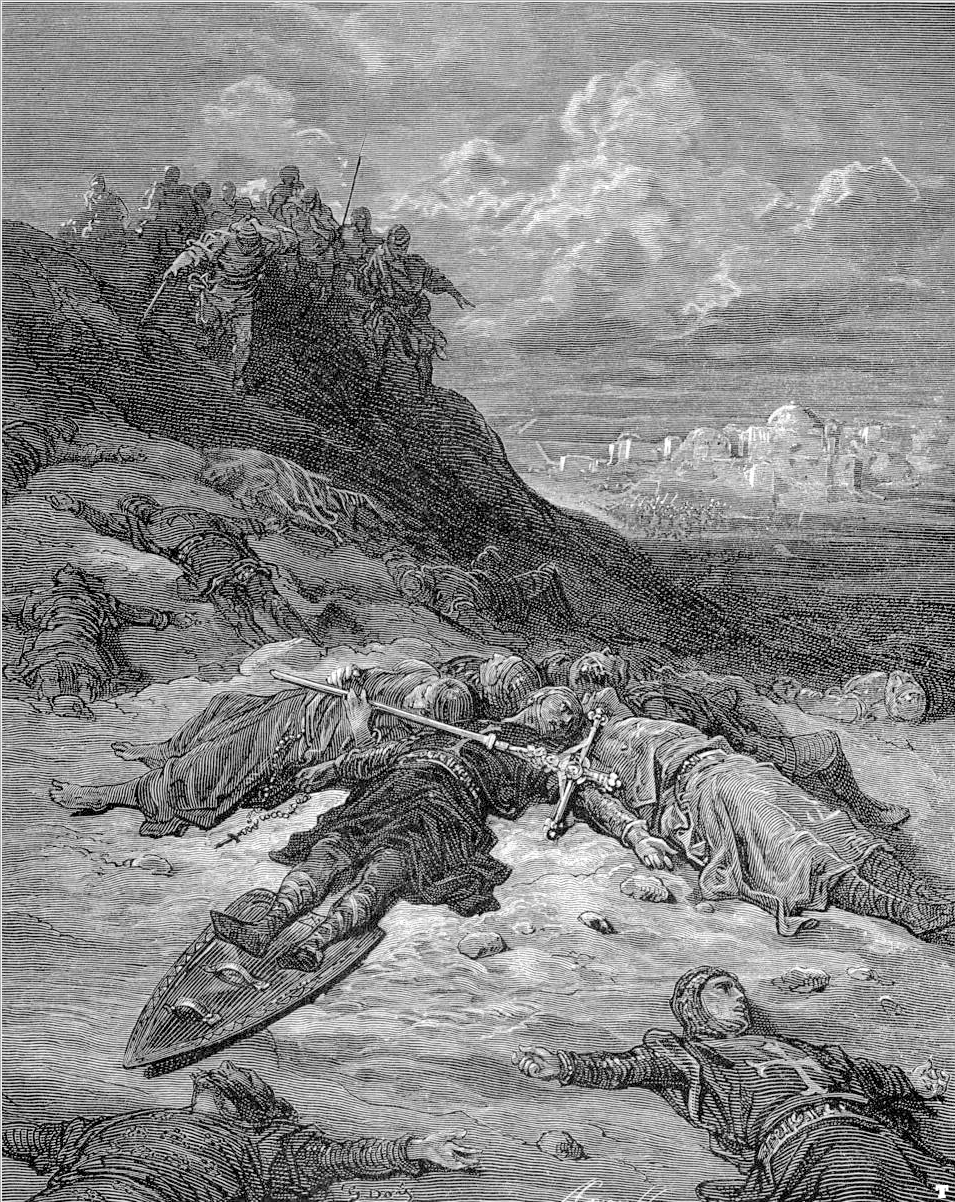
"Death of Frederick of Germany" by Gustav Dore

== Reformation ==
During the German Peasants' War, spanning from 1524 to 1525 in the Holy Roman Empire, the peasants rebelled against the nobility. The rebellion ultimately failed in the end and Emperor Charles V became much harsher.

== Thirty Years War ==
From 1618 to 1648 the Thirty Years' War ravaged Germany, when it became the main theatre of war in the conflict between France and the Habsburgs for predominance in Europe. Besides being at war with Catholic France, Germany was attacked by the Lutheran King Gustavus Adolphus of Sweden, who won many victories until he was killed at Lützen. The war resulted in large areas of Germany being laid waste, causing general impoverishment and a loss of around a third of its population; it took generations to recover. It ended with the Peace of Westphalia, which stabilized the nation states of Europe.

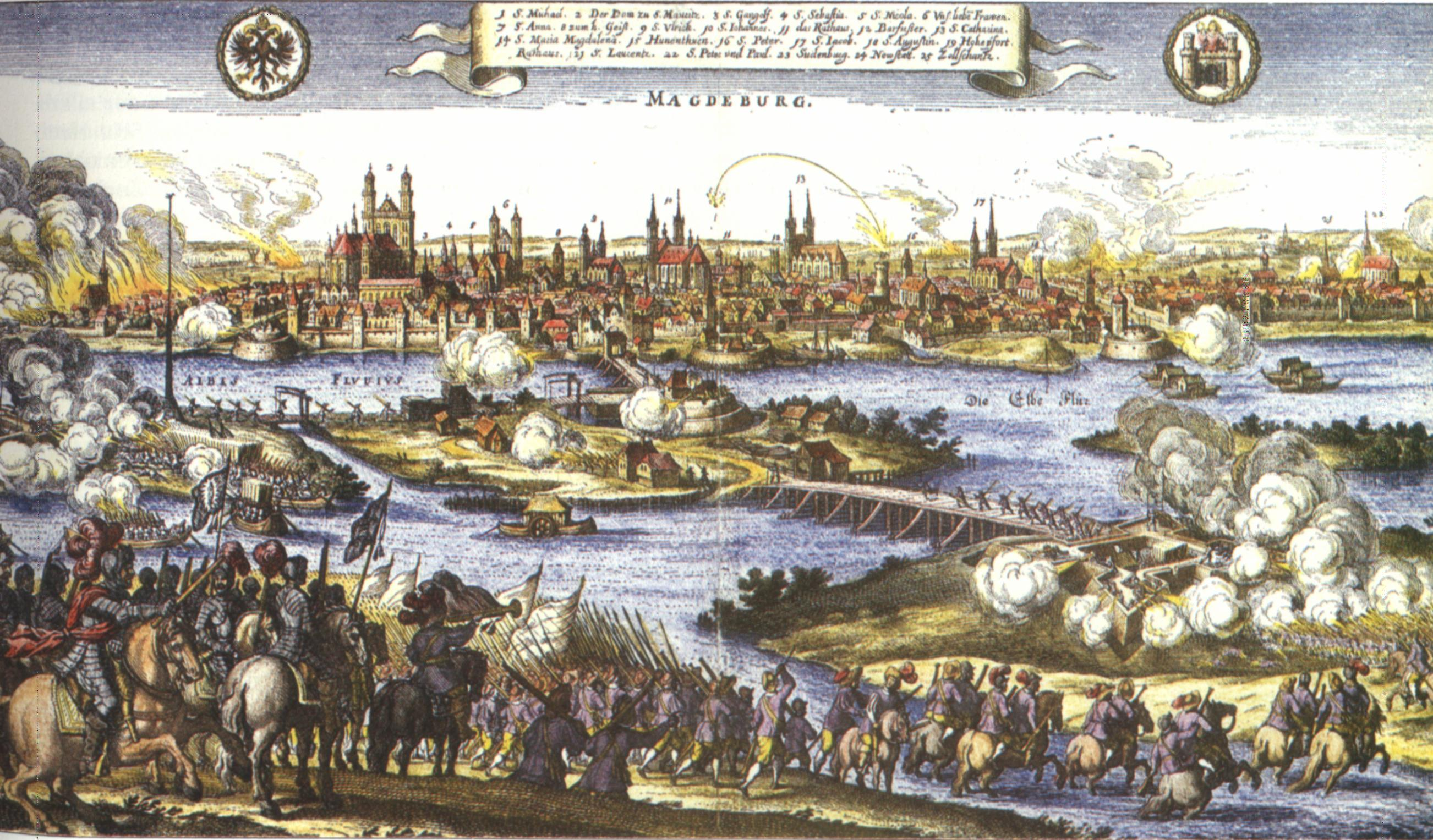
Sack of Magdeburg in 1631. Of the 30,000 citizens, only 5,000 survived.

The imperial general Prince Eugene of Savoy faced the Ottoman Turks on the battlefield, first coming to prominence during the last major Turkish offensive against the Austrian capital of Vienna in 1683. By the closing years of the 17th century, he was already famous for securing Hungary from the Ottoman Empire, and soon rose to the role of principal Austrian commander during the War of the Spanish Succession.

== 18th century ==
From 1701 to 1714 the War of the Spanish Succession, Germany fought with the English and the Dutch against the French. During the early part of the war, the French were successful until Camille de Tallard was victorious in the Palatinate. Later, in 1706, the Germans took back their land with the help of the Dutch and the English. The Austrians pushed the French back in North Italy and the coalition scored several successes in the low countries. At that time, half of the Dutch or the British armies were composed of German mercenaries. The German states that participated in the war were Austria (which contributed the most), Prussia and Hanover.

During the reign of Frederick William I (1713–40), the military power of Prussia was significantly improved. He organized the government around the needs of his army, and produced an efficient, highly disciplined instrument of war. The Prussian Army was expanded to 80,000 men, about 4% of the total population. Peasants were drafted into the military and trained for duty, but were sent home for ten months out of each year.

=== Frederick the Great ===
Frederick the Great, king of Prussia from 1740 to 1786, modernized the Prussian Army, introduced new tactical and strategical concepts, fought mostly successful wars and doubled the size of Prussia. Frederick had a rationale based on Enlightenment thought: he launched total wars for limited objectives. The goal was to convince rival kings that it was better to negotiate and make peace than to fight him.

In the War of Austrian Succession (1740–48) Empress Maria Theresa of Austria fought successfully for recognition of her succession to the throne. However, during the subsequent Silesian Wars and the Seven Years' War, King Frederick the Great (Frederick II) occupied Silesia and forced Austria to formally cede control in the Treaty of Hubertusburg of 1763. Prussia had survived the combined force of its neighbours, each larger than itself, and gained enormously in influence at the cost of the Holy Roman Empire. It became recognised as a great European power, starting a rivalry with Austria for the leadership of the German-speaking lands.

During the Seven Years' War, Prussia fought on the side of Britain against Russia, Sweden, Austria, France, and Saxony. Frederick II of Prussia first invaded Saxony and defeated a Saxon army at Lobositz. Frederick would then invade Bohemia, the Prussians besieged Prague, but they were defeated at Kolin. Since Prussia looked vulnerable, the Austrians and French invaded Prussian lands. However, the French were defeated at Rossbach and the Austrians at Leuthen. In 1758, Frederick the Great tried to invade Austria, but he failed. Now, the Russians tried to defeat the Prussians, but the Prussians earned a pyrrhic victory at the Zorndorf. The Swedes, however, fought the Prussians to a draw at Tornow. However, Austria gained a victory against the Prussian main army at Hochkirch. In 1759, the Prussians lost at Kunersdorf to the combined Russians and Austrians. Berlin itself was taken for a few days in 1762, but its army could not be destroyed. However, the great alliance against Prussia broke up when Elizabeth of Russia died. It was from her death that a pro-Prussian ruler, Peter III would sue for peace. It was thanks to this "miracle of the House of Brandenburg" and to the unshakable will of Frederick that Prussia survived.

== Napoleonic Wars (1805–1815) ==
The Napoleonic era ended the Holy Roman Empire and created new German-speaking states that would eventually form modern Germany. Napoleon I of France reorganized many of the smaller German-speaking states into the Confederation of the Rhine following the battle of Austerlitz in 1805. Essentially this enlarged the more powerful states of the region by absorbing the smaller ones, creating a set of buffer states for France and a source of army conscripts. Neither of the two largest German-speaking states were part of this confederation: the Kingdom of Prussia and the Austrian Empire remained outside it.

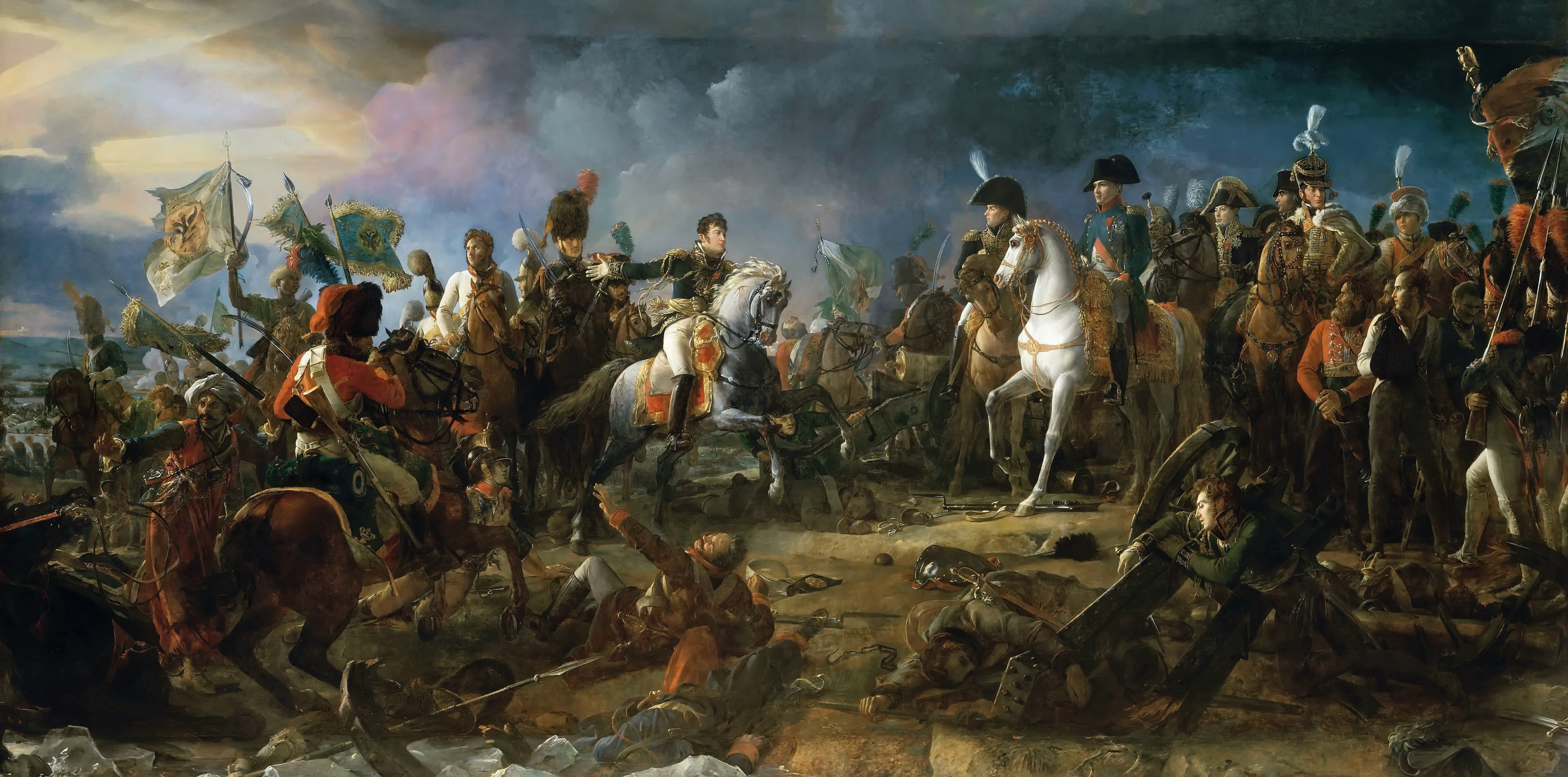
Napoleon at the battle of Austerlitz, by François Pascal Simon, Baron Gérard

King Frederick William III of Prussia viewed the Confederation of the Rhine as a threat to Prussian interests and allied against Napoleon. At this time the reputation of the Royal Prussian Army remained high from the period of the Seven Years' War. Unfortunately they retained the tactics of that period and still relied heavily on foreign mercenaries. The lack of military reforms would prove disastrous. Prussian defeats at Jena and Auerstedt led to a humiliating settlement that reduced the size of the country by half.

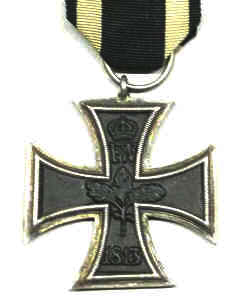
The original Iron Cross military medal from 1813

The Electorate of Hanover, up till the Convention of Artlenburg ruled in personal union by the English King George III, was incorporated into Prussia. The King's German Legion formed in Britain from officers and soldiers of the dissolved Hanoverian Army, was the only army of a German state that was continually fighting the Napoleonic army.

A demoralised Prussia brought its distinguished old general Gebhard von Blücher out of retirement and reorganized the army. The reforms of the Prussian military were led by Scharnhorst and Gneisenau, and converted the professional army into one based on national service. They brought in younger leaders, increased the rate of mobilisation and improved their skirmishing and unit tactics. They also organized a centralized general staff and a professional officer corps.

Following Napoleon's defeat in Russia, Prussia, Austria and a few other German states saw their chance and joined the anti-French forces in the Sixth Coalition, which won a decisive victory over France at Leipzig in 1813 and forced the abdication of Napoleon. Although declared an outlaw by the Congress of Vienna, Napoleon returned and met a final defeat at the hands of Blücher and Wellington at Waterloo in 1815.

== Uniting Germany (1815–1871) ==
By 1815 there were 39 separate German-speaking states, loosely joined (for free trade purposes) in the German Confederation, under the leadership of Prussia and Austria. Under the leadership of Chancellor Otto von Bismarck, Prussia united the German states and defeated both Austria and France, 1866 to 1871, allowing the formation of a powerful German Empire, which lasted until 1918. Bismarck after 1871 dominated European diplomacy, and set up a complex system of balances that kept the peace. He was replaced in 1890 by the young Kaiser Wilhelm II, who built up a powerful Navy to challenge the British, and engaged in reckless diplomacy.

=== Clausewitz ===
Carl von Clausewitz (1780–1831) was the most important German military theorist; he stressed the moral and political aspects of war. Clausewitz espoused a romantic or Hegelian conception of warfare, stressing the dialectic of how opposite factors interact, and noting how unexpected new developments unfolding under the "fog of war" called for rapid decisions by alert commanders. Clausewitz saw history as a complex check on abstractions that did not accord with experience. In opposition to his great rival Antoine-Henri Jomini he argued war could not be quantified or graphed or reduced to mapwork and graphs. Clausewitz had many aphorisms, of which the most famous is, "War is not merely a political act, but also a political instrument, a continuation of political relations, a carrying out of the same by other means," a working definition of war which has won wide acceptance.

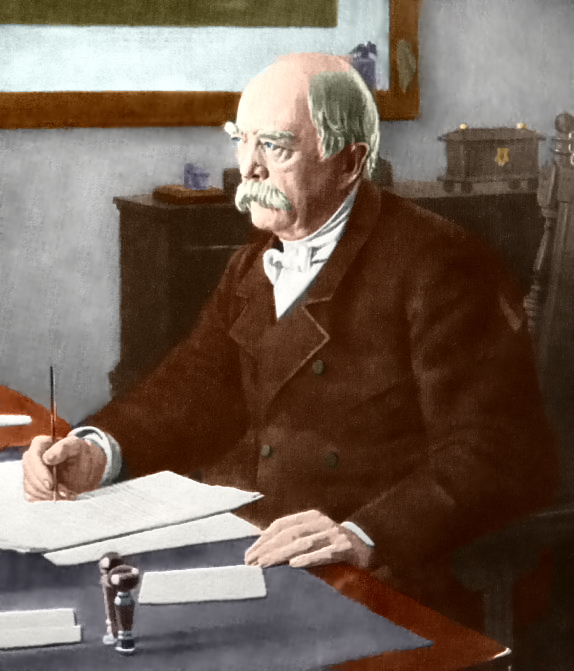
Otto von Bismarck became Chancellor of a united Germany after defeating France in 1871.

== German Empire 1871–1918 ==
After Prussia under Otto von Bismarck won a series of wars against Denmark, Austria and France, it united most of the German states into the German Empire. Its highly professional army set world standards but fought no more wars until 1914.

=== Wars of Unification ===
After a period of constitutional deadlock between crown and parliament in Prussia, a crisis arose in 1863 over the duchies of Schleswig and Holstein, disputed between Denmark and the German Confederation. After the Danish annexation of Schleswig, Otto von Bismarck, the new prime Minister of Prussia, made the smaller states of the German Confederation join Prussia and Austria in the war with Denmark. The Second Schleswig War ended with the defeat of the Danes at Dybbøl, and an agreement between Austria and Prussia to jointly administer Schleswig and Holstein.

Bismarck then set about making Prussia the undisputed master of northern Germany, weakening Austria and the German Confederation. This eventually led to a German civil war, the Austro-Prussian War, in which in the Battle of Langensalza (the last battle between Germanic states on German soil) Hanover won a victory, but was so weakened by it, that it could offer no resistance to the occupation by Prussia and ceased to be an independent state. The victory of Prussia and its allies at Königgrätz in July 1866, against Austria and its allies sealed this. The result was the dissolution of the German Confederation, and the creation of the North German Confederation one year later.

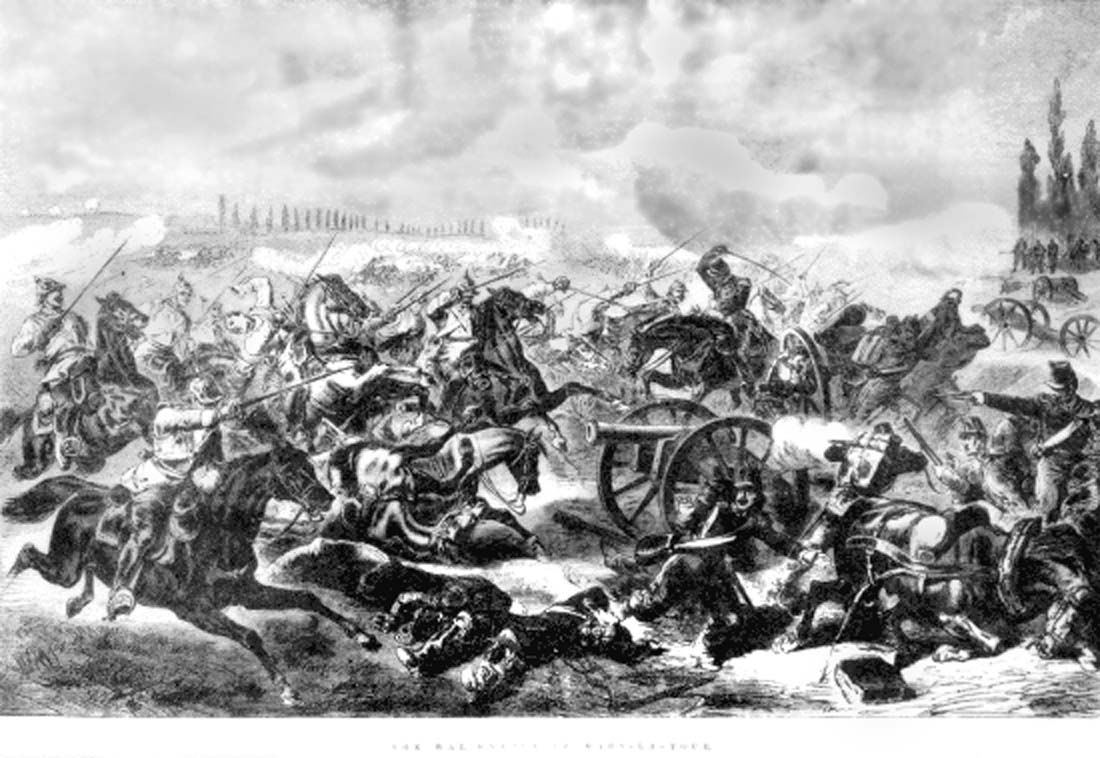
The Prussian 7th Cuirassiers charge the French guns at the Battle of Mars-La-Tour, August 16, 1870.

Bismarck wanted a war with France to unify the German peoples, and French Emperor Napoleon III, unaware of his military weakness, provided the Franco-Prussian War of 1870–71, expecting support from Prussia's recent enemies. Unlike in the war only a few years ago, the Germans turned not against each other, with the first emergence of a strong German national sentiment in the background. Instead, the southern German monarchs of Bavaria, Württemberg, and Baden honoured their secretly negotiated treaties of mutual defence with Berlin, while Austria remained neutral.

The Germans, led by King William I of Prussia and Moltke the Elder, mobilized a mass conscript army of 1.2 million men (300,000 regulars and 900,000 reserves and Landwehr) which faced 492,585 experienced regular French soldiers and 420,000 Garde Mobile under Napoleon III of France. Within the first month of war the German army encircled big French armies, at Gravelotte, Metz, and Sedan and destroyed them. The war culminated with the defeat of the French army during the Siege of Paris, and was followed by the proclamation of the German Empire in 1871.

=== Naval race ===
The results of these wars was the emergence of a powerful German nation-state and a major shift in the balance of power on the European continent. The Imperial German Army now was the most powerful military in Europe. Although Germany now had a parliament, it did not control the military, which was under the direct command of the Kaiser (Emperor). The German economy was rapidly growing, as was German pride and intense nationalism.

After 1890, Germany made a major effort to build up its navy, leading to a naval arms race with Britain. Germany also sought coaling stations because the coal-burning warships had to be refueled frequently, and Britain had a large worldwide network. Efforts to gain coaling stations in the Caribbean or west Indies failed. By 1900, the possibility of a conflict between Germany and Britain loomed larger, as Germany built up its own (much smaller) colonial empire, and started a naval race to try and catch up with Britain, the world's dominant naval power.

== World War I (1914–1918) ==
German soldiers on the front in World War I

The German Schlieffen plan to deal with the Franco-Russian alliance involved delivering a knock-out blow to the French and then turning to deal with the more slowly mobilised Russian army. At the start of World War I, Germany attacked France through Belgium to avoid French defenses on the French-German border. They were beaten back at the First Battle of the Marne. Three years of stalemated trench warfare on the Western Front produced millions of casualties (with one-third killed). New tactics in 1918 opened up the war, but a series of massive German offensives failed in spring 1918, and Germany went on the defensive as fresh American soldiers arrived at the rate of 10,000 a day. Militarily defeated, stripped of allies, and exhausted on the homefront, Germany signed an armistice in November 1918 that amounted to a surrender.

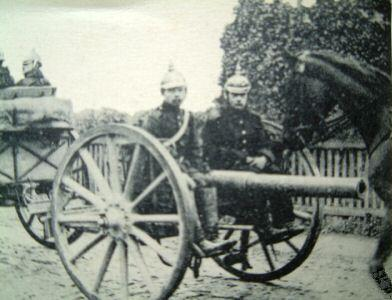
German artillery shown on a 1914 postcard

In the East, however, the war was not confined to trenches. The Russian initial plans for war had called for simultaneous invasions of Austrian Galicia and German East Prussia. Although Russia's initial advance into Galicia was largely successful, it was driven back from East Prussia by the victories of the German generals Paul von Hindenburg and Erich Ludendorff at Tannenberg and the Masurian Lakes in August and September 1914. Russia's less-developed economic and military organisation soon proved unequal to the combined might of the German and Austro-Hungarian Empires. In the spring of 1915 the Russians were driven back in Galicia, and in May the Central Powers achieved a remarkable breakthrough on Poland's southern fringes, capturing Warsaw on 5 August and forcing the Russians to withdraw from all of Poland, known as the "Great Retreat".

The German Fleet spent most of the war bottled up in port; the great Battle of Jutland in 1916 showed superior German tactics could not overwhelm the more powerful British fleet. U-boats were used by the Imperial German Navy to sink merchant ships bringing supplies to England. This strategy alienated the United States, which declared war in April 1917. Shipments of food and munitions to Britain and France were increased, as the convoy system largely neutralized the U-boats.

By 1917 the German army had begun employing new infiltration tactics in an effort to break the trench warfare deadlock. Units of stormtroopers, were trained and equipped for the new tactics, and were used with devastating effect along the Russian front at Riga then at the Battle of Caporetto in Italy. These formations were then deployed to the Western front to counter the British tank attack at the Battle of Cambrai. On 3 March 1918, Germany and its allies had victory over Russia in Eastern Front.

In March 1918 the German army Spring Offensive began an impressive advance creating a salient in the allied line in Western Front. The offensive stalled as the British and French fell back and then counterattacked. The Germans did not have the airpower or tanks to secure their battlefield gains. The Allies, invigorated by American manpower, money, and food, counterattacked in late summer and rolled over the depleted German lines, as the German navy rebelled and support for the war on the homefront evaporated.

Germany signed the armistice to end its participation in World War I on 11 November 1918.

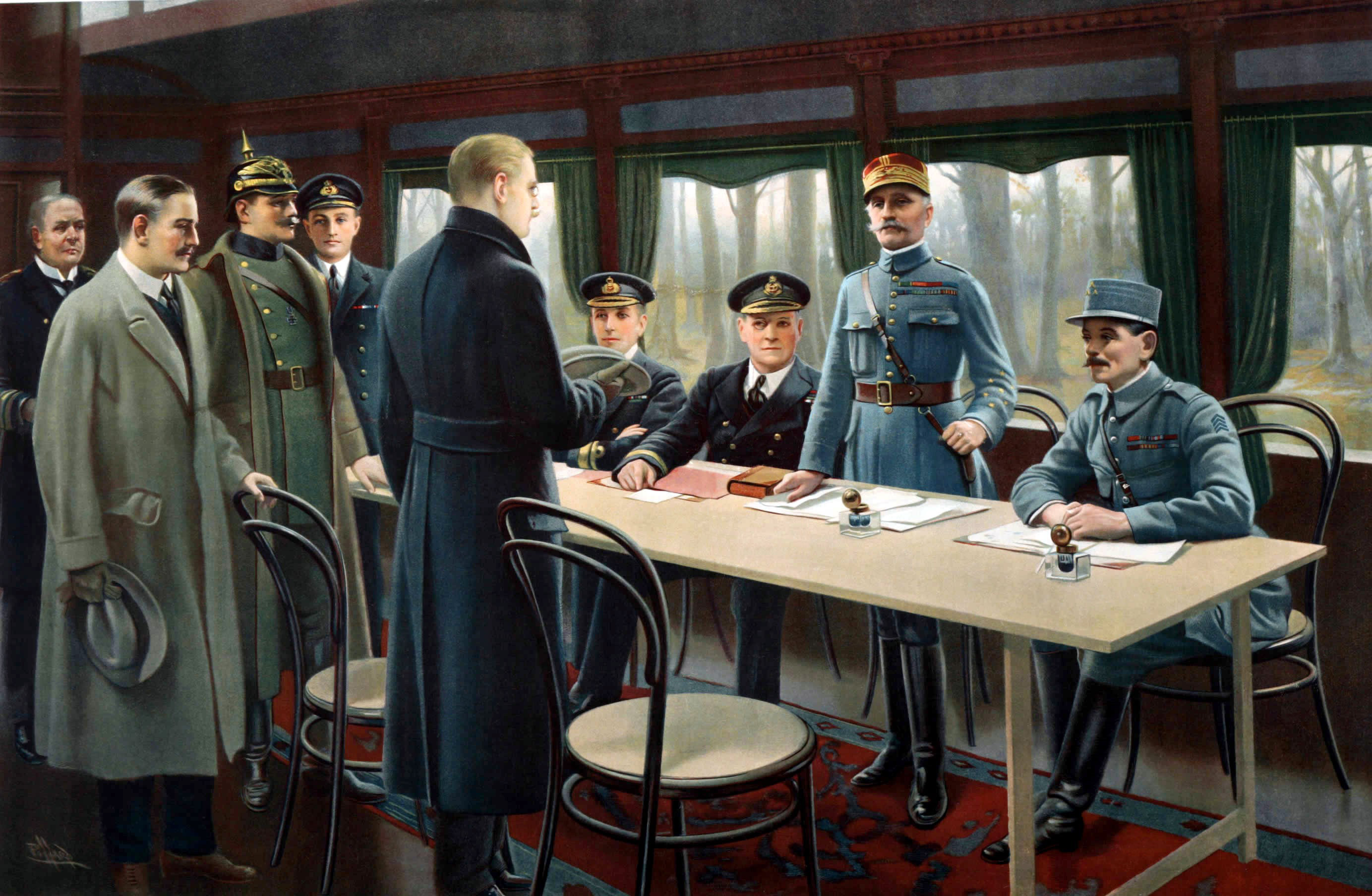
Germany signed the armistice to end its participation in World War I on 11 November 1918.

== Weimar Republic and the Third Reich (1918–1939) ==
The treaty of Versailles imposed severe restrictions on Germany's military strength. The army was limited to one hundred thousand men with an additional fifteen thousand in the navy. The fleet was to consist of at most six battleships, six cruisers, and twelve destroyers, and the Washington Naval Treaty established severe tonnage restrictions for German warships. Tanks and heavy artillery were forbidden and the air force was dissolved. A new post-war military (Reichswehr) was established in March 1921. General conscription was not allowed. The new Weimar Republic had to follow these restrictions, which worsened its already low public esteem.

General Hans von Seeckt the Army Commander, used the lessons of the First World War and the latest technology to develop advanced tactical doctrines, more efficient organizational structures, and better training that kept the small army ready for expansion. The government secretly trained soldiers in the Soviet Union, but otherwise generally followed the Versailles restrictions while retaining a strong cadre of officers and senior non-coms.

The Nazis came to power in 1933 and began remilitarisation. Heavy military spending quickly restored the depression-ravaged economy, making Adolf Hitler popular with the people and the military. German armed forces were named the Wehrmacht from 1935 to 1945. The Army (Heer) was encouraged to experiment with tanks and motorised infantry, using the ideas of Heinz Guderian. The Kriegsmarine restarted naval construction and Hitler established the Luftwaffe, an independent air force.

Threats to use military force were a staple in Nazi foreign policy. They were not actually used except as German involvement in the Spanish Civil War (1936–39), where the Luftwaffe gained important combat experience.

== World War II (1939–1945) ==
Farrell argues that the historiography of the army in World War II has been "extremely difficult" because of the stark dichotomy between its superb combat performance and the horrors of its destruction and crimes against civilians and prisoners.

At first Germany's military moves were brilliantly successful, as in the "blitzkrieg" invasions of Poland (1939), Norway and Denmark (1940), the Low Countries (1940), and above all the stunningly successful invasion and quick conquest of France in May and June 1940. Hitler probably wanted peace with Britain in late 1940, but Winston Churchill, standing alone, was dogged in his defiance. Churchill had major financial, military, and diplomatic help from President Franklin D. Roosevelt in the United States, another implacable foe of Hitler. Rising tensions with the Soviet Union eventually led Germany to launch a full-scale invasion of its former ally in June 1941. Hitler's insistence on maintaining high living standards postponed the full mobilization of the national economy until 1942, years after the great rivals Britain, Russia, and the U.S. had fully mobilized.

=== Poland, Denmark and Norway ===
In September 1939, Germany invaded Poland using new tactics that combining the use of tanks, motorised infantry, and air support – known as Blitzkrieg – caused Polish resistance to collapse within weeks especially once the soviets attacked later that same month from the East. Britain and France declared war but over the winter of 1939–40 there was very little combat in what was called the Phoney War.

In April 1940, in Operation Weserübung, German combined air, land and sea forces invaded and occupied neutral Denmark with little fighting. Then they fought a successful Norwegian Campaign against the British and Norwegian forces to conquer Norway and to secure access to the North Sea and to Swedish iron ore. Sweden remained neutral throughout the war, but Finland became a German ally and fought two wars (Winter War and Continuation War) against the Soviet Union, then ruled by Stalin.

=== France ===
The French plans were largely based on a static defense behind the Maginot Line – a series of formidable defensive forts along the French-German border. German General Erich von Manstein thought of an idea which led eventually to the approval of a Sichelschnitt ('Sickle Cut') (Manstein plan) plan for the conquest of France. On 10 May 1940 the Germans bypassed the Maginot Line by launching another Blitzkrieg through neutral Belgium, Luxemburg and the Netherlands, drawing the Allied forces out. The main thrust of the Battle of France attack however was through the Ardennes which were to that time believed impenetrable to tanks. The British Expeditionary Force and other allied units were driven back to the coast at Dunkirk, but managed to escape with most of their troops (Dunkirk evacuation) when Germany made a mistaken decision not to attack with tanks. In June 1940, with French troops encircled and cut off in the north, France asked for an armistice (signed on 22 June 1940) that allowed Germany to control most of the French coast and left Vichy France under German domination. On 11 November 1941, Germany occupied France completely.

=== Battle of Britain ===
Hitler at least wanted to threaten an invasion of Britain, perhaps to force a peace, so an armada of small boats and a large combat force was assembled in northern France. The Battle of Britain was of basic strategic significance, for Berlin believed that it could defeat Britain only by physical invasion by the Army, codenamed Operation Sea Lion. The British Army had rescued its soldiers at Dunkirk but lost most of its equipment and weapons, and was no match for the fully equipped German army. The invasion could succeed only if the Luftwaffe could guarantee the Royal Navy would not be able to attack the landing force. To do so, the Royal Air Force had to be defeated.

The Battle took place August to September 1940. The Luftwaffe used 1300 medium bombers guarded by 900 fighters; they made 1500 sorties a day from bases in France, Belgium and Norway. The Royal Air Force (RAF) had 650 fighters, with more being produced every day. Thanks to radar technology (Chain Home), the British knew where the Germans were, and could concentrate their counterattacks. The Germans used their strategic bombing doctrine to focus on RAF airfields and radar stations. After the RAF bomber forces (quite separate from the fighter forces) attacked Berlin and other cities (a war crime), Hitler swore revenge and diverted the Luftwaffe to attacks on London (a war crime). The success the Luftwaffe was having in rapidly wearing down the RAF was squandered, as the civilians being hit were far less critical than the airfields and radar stations that were now ignored. The last German daylight raid was September 30; the Luftwaffe was taking unacceptable losses and broke off the attacks; occasional air raids hit London and other cities from time to time before May 1941, killing over 42,000 civilians. The Luftwaffe lost 1733 planes, the British, 915. The British showed more determination, better radar, and better ground control, while the Germans violated their own doctrine with wasted attacks on London.

The British surprised the Germans with their high quality aircraft; flying close to home bases where they could refuel, and using radar as part of an integrated air defense system, they had a significant advantage over German aircraft operating at long ranges. The Hawker Hurricane fighter played a vital role for the RAF in winning the Battle of Britain in the summer of 1940. A fast, heavily armed monoplane that went into service in 1937, the Hurricane was effective against both German fighters and bombers and accounted for 70–75% of German losses during the battle of Britain. The Germans immediately pulled out their Stukas, which were no match against the Hurricanes and Supermarine Spitfires. The Battle of Britain showed the world that Hitler's vaunted war machine could be defeated.

Barley (2004) identifies numerous failures by the German high command. Hitler was indecisive, failing to identify a political goal that would define the military mission. Luftwaffe planning was muddled, and overlooked the important lessons learned during the Spanish Civil War (1936—1939). The operation was poorly supported by German intelligence. Germany failed to adhere to two key principles of war: know your enemy and yourself, and select and maintain your aim.

=== Balkans ===
To support their weakened Italian allies who had started several invasions (1939 in Albania and Greco-Italian War from 28 October 1940 to 23 April 1941), in April 1941 Germany deployed troops in Yugoslavia and Greece. These deployments disrupted Berlin's timetable, and delayed the invasion of the Soviet Union. In the Balkans it was a matter of guerrilla war which was extremely violent on all sides.

=== Operation Barbarossa ===
Hitler made the fateful decision to invade Russia in early 1941, but was delayed by the need to take control of the Balkans. Europe was not big enough for both Hitler and Stalin, and Hitler realized the sooner he moved the less risk of American involvement. Stalin thought he had a long-term partnership and rejected information coming from all directions that Germany was about to invade in June 1941. As a result, the Russians were poorly prepared and suffered huge losses, being pushed back to Moscow by December before holding the line. Hitler imagined that the Soviet Union was a hollow shell that would easily collapse, like France. He therefore had not prepared for a long war, and did not have sufficient winter clothing and gear for his soldiers. Weinberg (1994) argues that decisions concerning the invasion of the Soviet Union in June 1941 must be understood in the broader context of Hitler's ideological motivations and long-term goals. Although Hitler had decided to invade the Soviet Union as early as 1940, German resources never reflected this; armaments production, tank and aircraft construction, and logistical preparations focused on the West. Diplomatic activity was similarly skewed; Hitler granted Stalin any territory he wanted (such as Lithuania), knowing they would soon be at war and Germany would reclaim it anyway. Hitler, blinded by his racist prejudices against Slavs, believed the Eastern campaign would be quick and easy. His real strategic concern was Great Britain and the United States, and his planning consistently demonstrated this.

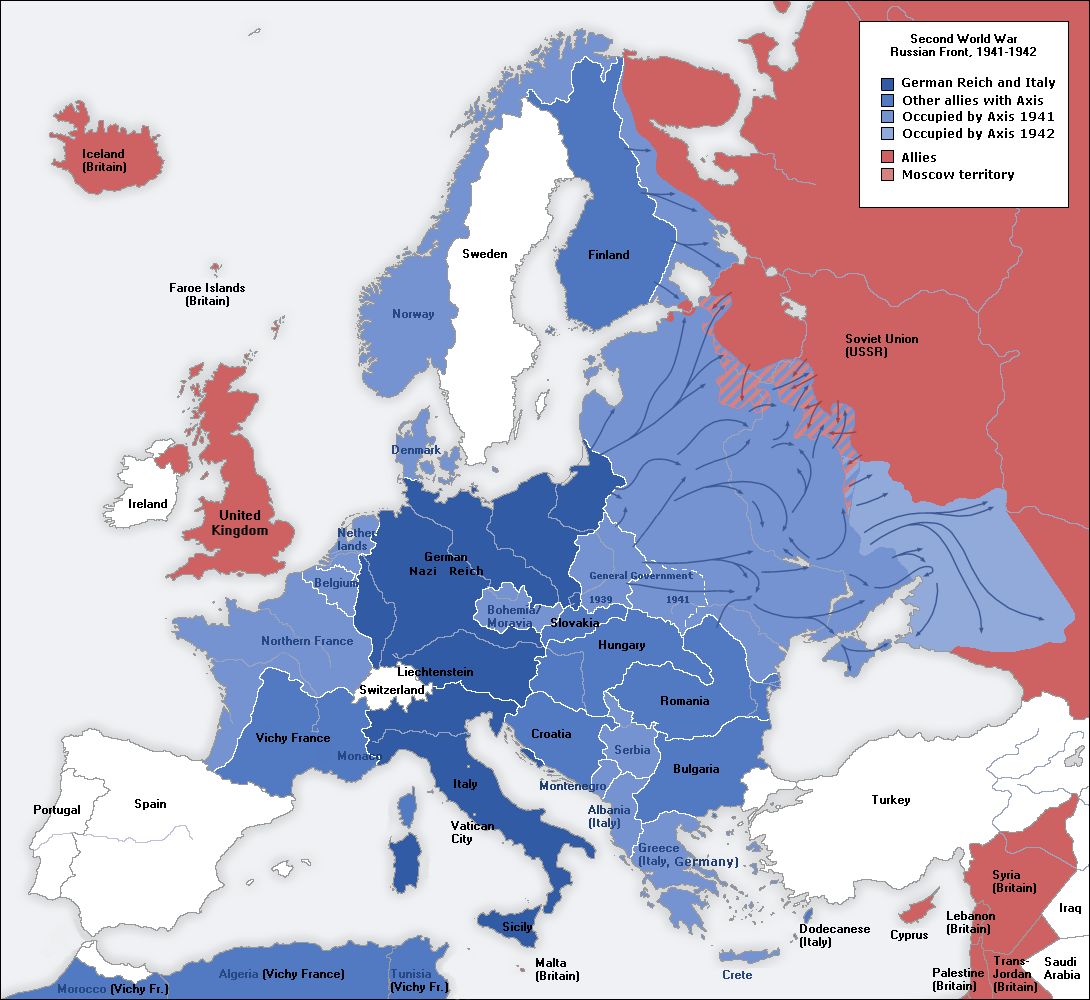
The Axis-controlled territory in Europe at the time of its maximal expansion (1941–42)

The Balkan operation had caused a delay, and about six weeks later than planned, on 22 June 1941, Germany reneged on its non-aggression pact with the Soviet Union and launched Operation Barbarossa. The German army and its allies made enormous territorial gains in the first months of the war, reaching the outskirts of Moscow when winter set in. Expecting another Blitzkrieg victory, the Germans had not properly prepared for warfare in winter and over long distances.

=== High Point and Collapse ===
The years 1941/1942 saw the high point for the German army which controlled an area from France to deep into Russia, and from Norway to western Egypt. Consequently, it also proved to be the turning point. The harsh Russian winters and long supply lines worked in Russia's favour and German armies were decisively defeated in early 1943 at Stalingrad and later in the gigantic tank battle at Kursk. British and American forces cut off reinforcements to North Africa, defeated Field Marshal Erwin Rommel, and captured the German and Italian forces there.

Hitler was technologically oriented and promoted a series of new secret weapons, such as the jet plane, the jet-powered missile (V-1), the rocket-powered missile (V-2), and vastly improved submarines. However he failed to support development of nuclear weapons or proximity fuses, and trailed the Allies in radar. He failed to take advantage of the German lead in jet planes.

In early 1943 the Soviet victory at Stalingrad marked the beginning of the end, as Germany was unable to cope with the superior manpower and industrial resources of the Allies. North Africa, Sicily, and southern Italy fell in 1943. Hitler rescued Benito Mussolini from prison. Mussolini set up a new "Salo Republic" but he was a mere puppet, as German forces blocked the Allies from the industrial northern third of Italy. The Russians pushed forward relentlessly in the East, while the Allies in the west launched a major bombing campaign in 1944–45 that destroyed all major and many smaller German cities, ruined transportation, and signaled to Germans how hopeless their cause was.

The Allies invaded France in June 1944 as the Russians launched another attack on the east. Both attacks were successful and by the end of 1944, the end was in sight. Hitler did launch a surprise attack at the Bulge in December 1944; it was his last major initiative and it failed, as Allied armor rolled into Germany. Disregarding his generals, Hitler rejected withdrawals and retreats, counting more and more on nonexistent armies. Hitler committed suicide in his underground bunker in Berlin as his last soldiers were overwhelmed by Soviet armies in intensely bloody battles overhead.

From 1944 on, the Nazis' imagination of a final battle at any cost created conditions for the loss of the eastern quarter of pre-war Germany at immeasurable harm to the German civilians. Defense of the German East was organized as a staggered structure in which the important cities such as Danzig, Breslau and Königsberg were made fortified cites. The cities became traps for the civilian population under the Red Army's advance, supported by US-delivered arms. The approaching front line caused civilians of the region to flee, but main roads had to be held free for military.

Germany signed the document of surrender to end its participation in World War II on 8 May 1945.

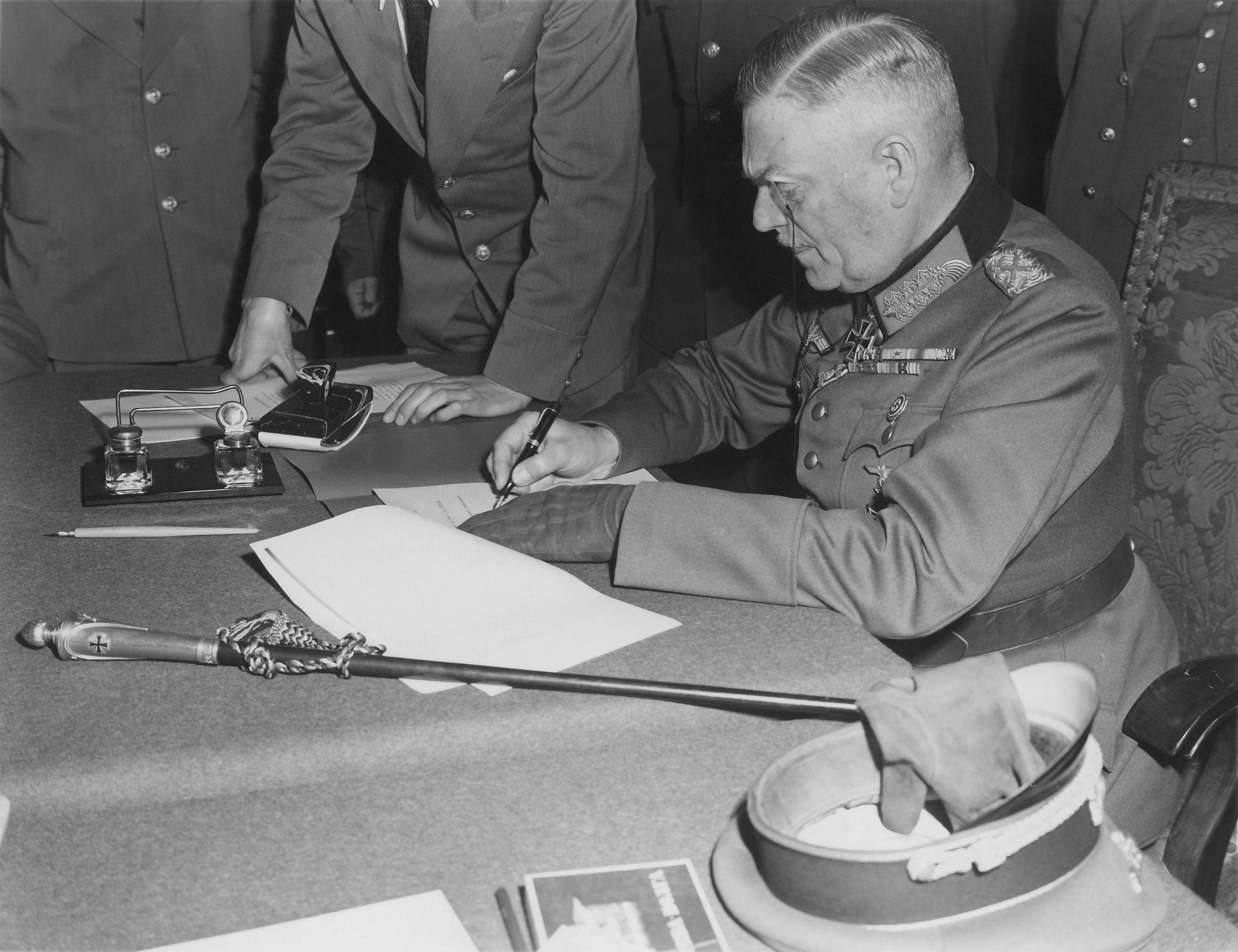
Germany signed the document of surrender to end its participation in World War II on 8 May 1945.

In the following months, the Soviets passed control over eastern Germany to the Polish Communist regime, creating a situation of a fait accompli. Under Soviet and Polish pressure for the new western border of Poland, Polish control over the area was agreed at the Potsdam Conference, pending a final peace conference with Germany. However, such a peace conference eventually never took place.

== Cold War (1949–1990) ==
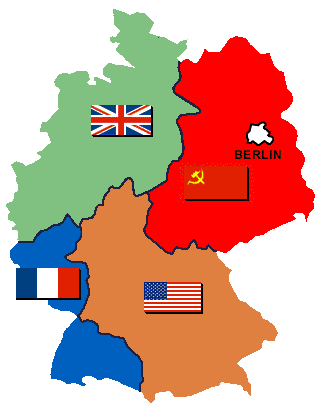
Occupation zones of Germany in 1945

Among the legacies of the Nazi era were the Nuremberg Trials of 1945–1949. These established the concept of war crimes in international law and created the precedent for trying future war criminals.

=== West Germany ===
In 1949, West Germany (Federal Republic of Germany) was formed from the French, British and American zones, while the Soviet zone formed East Germany (German Democratic Republic) and western Polish territories. In the latter region, almost all Germans were expelled under large human losses. The western territory of Germany fell under the protection of the NATO alliance in the west, while the eastern state joined the Warsaw Pact. Each state possessed its own military force, with eastern Germany formed along the Soviet model and federal Germany adopting a more 'western' organisation. The allied zones of Berlin became de facto part of the Federal Republic of Germany despite the city's location deep in the German Democratic Republic. That resulted in a special situation for Berlin, i.e. the draft was not in effect in West Berlin. This condition continued until 1990 when the two states were reunited.

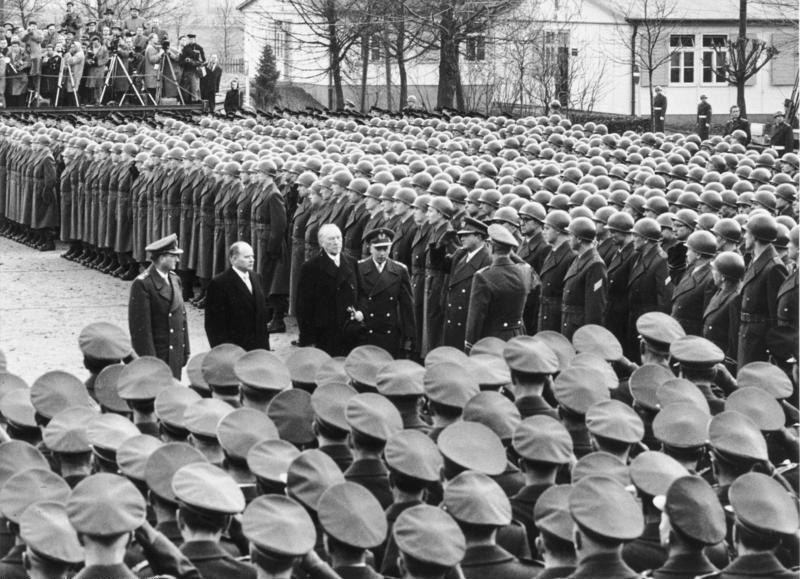
Konrad Adenauer, Theodor Blank, Adolf Heusinger and Hans Speidel inspect formations of the newly created Bundeswehr on 20 January 1955.

The Bundeswehr was established in 1955 in West Germany. In 1956, conscription for all men between 18 and 45 in years was introduced after heavy discussions about re-militarising Germany. A significant exception came from the conscientious objector clause in the West German constitution: West Germany was the first country to grant alternative service to all men who objected to military service on ethical grounds, regardless of religious affiliation. This was named "Zivildienst" roughly translated as "civil services".

Cold War analysts considered Germany the most likely location for the outbreak of a possible Third World War. Tensions ran high during 1948 when the Soviet Union and "Sowjetische Besatzungszone" (Soviet Occupied Territories) closed all roads bringing supplies to West Berlin. The Berlin Airlift sustained the population and avoided a new war. Construction of the Berlin Wall was in 1961.

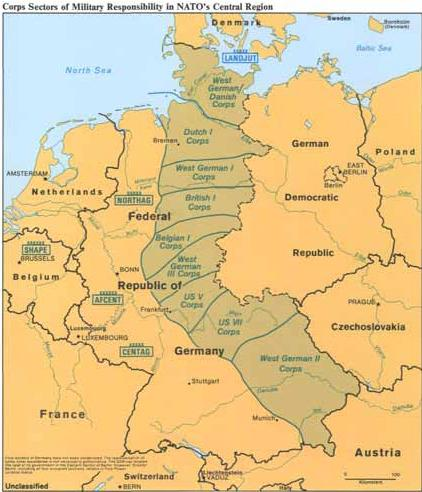
Corps sectors of military responsibility in NATO's central region in the 1980s

During the Cold War the Bundeswehr had a strength of 495,000 military and 170,000 civilian personnel. The army consisted of three corps with 12 divisions, most of them armed with tanks and APCs. The air force owned major numbers of tactical combat aircraft and took part in NATO's integrated air defence (NATINADS). The navy was tasked to defend the "Baltic Approaches" and to contain the Soviet Navy's Baltic Fleet.

The United States played a dominant role in NATO, and had its own forces stationed in Germany as well. Cooperation between the two militaries was extensive and cordial. Joint exercises and close collaboration allowed the German and American armies to learn from each other regarding strategy, tactics and technology. However, there were failures when it came to a joint venture in tank design in the 1960s, and the lack of cooperation in developing infantry fighting vehicles.

=== East Germany ===
In East Germany, the Nationale Volksarmee (National People's Army) or NVA was founded on 1 March 1956. Its predecessor was Kasernierte Volkspolizei suppressing East German uprising of 1953 with Soviet help. It grew steadily by gradual stages from the police force in the Soviet occupation zone in 1945 until the consolidation in the defense establishment in the 1970s. It was a professional volunteer army until 1962, when conscription was introduced. In 1987 at the peak of its power, the NVA numbered 175,300 troops. Approximately 50% of this number were career soldiers, while the remaining half were short-term conscripts. The armed forces were controlled by the National Defense Council, except that the mobile forces were under the Warsaw Pact Unified Command. Political control of the armed forces was through close integration with the SED (Communist Party), which vetted all the officers. Popular support for the military establishment was bolstered by military training provided by the school system and through the growing militarization of society. From a Leninist perspective, the NVA stood as a symbol of Soviet-East German solidarity and became the model Communist institution—ideological, hierarchical, and disciplined. The NVA synthesized Communist and Germanic symbolism, naming its officers' academy after Karl Marx's coauthor Friedrich Engels, and its highest medal after Prussian General Gerhard von Scharnhorst.

At the critical moment in its history in November 1989, the NVA refused to battle the demonstrators protesting the Communist regime. Mikhail Gorbachev refused to let Soviet troops become engaged, and so not just the leadership but the entire Communist system in East Germany collapsed, and the country was soon absorbed by West Germany.

== Post-Cold War to present-day ==
=== German reunification ===

In the Treaty on the Final Settlement with Respect to Germany (1990), Germany agreed to reduce the strength of its combined armed forces to no more than 370,000 men. After reunification, the Bundeswehr absorbed parts of the Nationale Volksarmee of the GDR, which was being dissolved. In 1999, the NATO war on Yugoslavia in Kosovo was the first offensive conflict in which the German military actively took part since the Second World War. In 2000, the European Court of Justice opened up the previously all-male (besides medical divisions and the music corps) Bundeswehr to women. Since the early 1990s, the Bundeswehr became more engaged in international peacekeeping missions in and around the former Yugoslavia, Cambodia, Somalia, Djibouti, Georgia, and Sudan.

=== Withdrawal and reduction of foreign armed forces ===
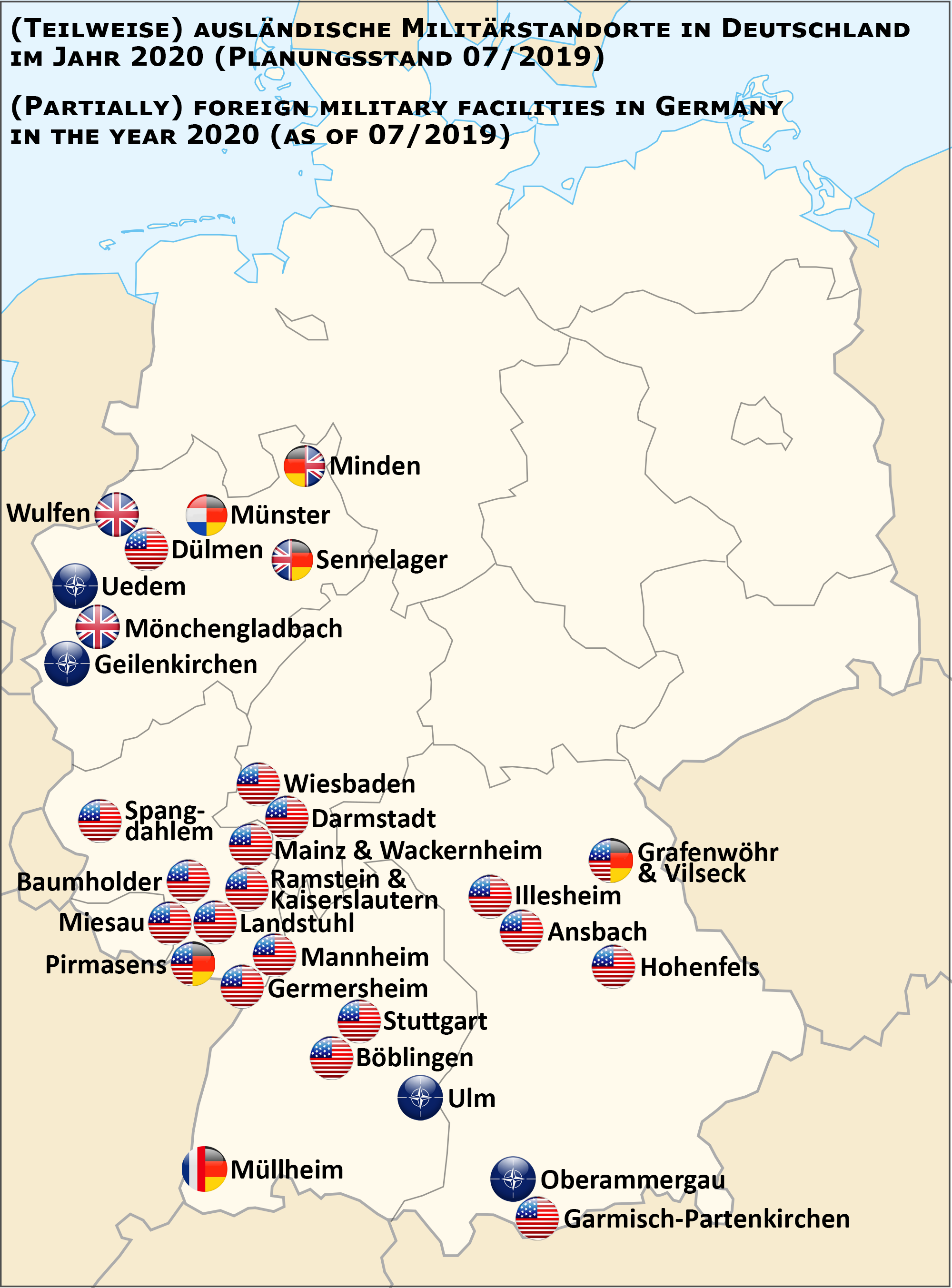
Foreign military facilities in Germany in 2020

Whereas Soviet, and later Russian, soldiers fully withdrew from reunified Germany in 1994, a status of forces agreement with certain western powers persists and some of them maintain forces in Germany, albeit in much smaller numbers. The United States has reduced its total forces, which numbered ca. 250,000 until 1990, down to 47,761 troops in 2012 and about 35,000 in 2025. As of 2025, ca. 1,200 British military personnel remain in Germany and are known as the British Army Germany. French and Dutch soldiers continue to be stationed on German soil as a part of the Franco-German Brigade in Müllheim, which is part of the Bundeswehr's 10. Panzerdivision, and the 1 German-Netherlands Corps in Münster, respectively..

=== War on terrorism ===
See also: German Armed Forces casualties in Afghanistan

In October 2001, the United States began the War in Afghanistan in response to the September 11 attacks of that year. As part of Operation Enduring Freedom, Germany was the second largest contributor of troops to the US-led coalition and deployed a total of over 150,000 soldiers over the course of 19 years from 2002 to 2021 to Afghanistan, including KSK special forces, naval vessels and NBC cleanup teams. German forces have contributed to ISAF, the NATO force in Afghanistan, and a Provincial Reconstruction Team.

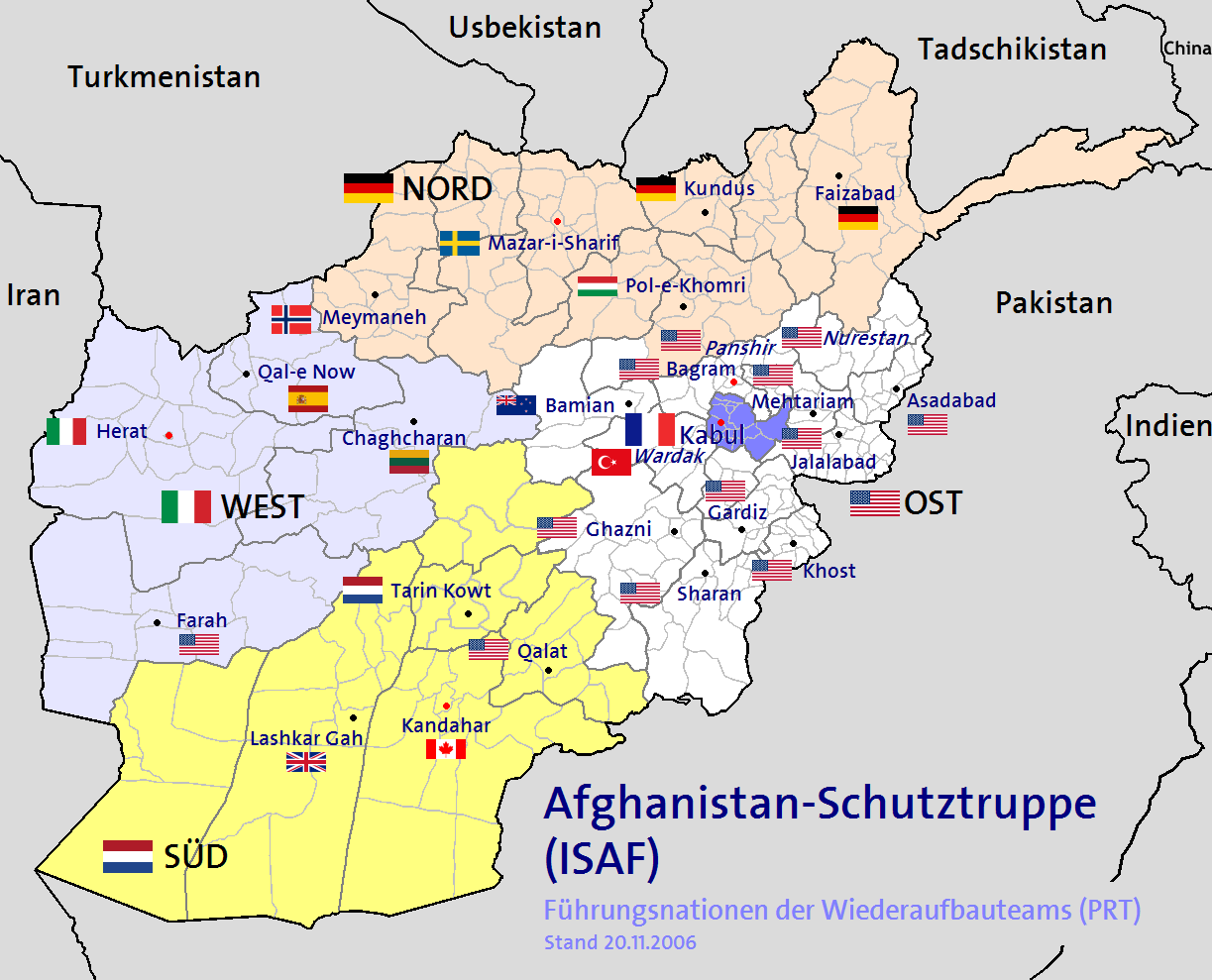
ISAF-Troops in Afghanistan under NATO-Command. German command was responsible for the north of the country.

German forces were in the more secure north of the country and Germany, along with some other larger European countries (with the exception of the UK, Estonia, the Netherlands and Norway), were criticized for not taking part in the more intensive combat operations in southern Afghanistan in 2006. The total number of concurrent German military personnel in Afghanistan peaked at over 5,000 in 2011 and by the time the US unilaterally decided to end western military presence in the country in 2021, 60 German soldiers had lost their lives there. These were the first significant military casualties in another country that Germany suffered since the Second World War and sparked a controversial public discussion around a central military memorial, which eventually resulted in the 2009 inauguration of the "Ehrenmal der Bundeswehr" at the Bendlerblock in Berlin.

=== Reorientation of the Bundeswehr ===
A major event for the German military was the suspension of the compulsory conscription for men in 2011. In 2011/12, a major reform of the Bundeswehr was announced, further limiting the number of military bases and soldiers. As of December 2012, the number of active military personnel in the Bundeswehr was down to 191,818, corresponding to a ratio of 2.3 active soldiers per 1,000 inhabitants. Military expenditure in Germany was at €31.55 billion in 2011, corresponding to 1.2% of GDP. Both the number of active soldiers and the military expenditure placed Germany below comparable countries of the European Union such as France and the United Kingdom. While this was already true in absolute terms, the difference was even more pronounced when taking into account Germany's larger population and economy. Thus, Germany appeared less prepared to pay for the military and to attach less importance to defense than comparable countries. This stance often drew criticism from Germany's military allies, especially the United States.

In May 2016 and partially motivated by the 2014 Russian annexation of Crimea, the German government announced it would spend €130 billion on new equipment by 2030 and add nearly 7,000 soldiers by 2023 in the first German military expansion since the end of the Cold War. In February 2017, the German government announced another expansion, which would increase the number of its professional soldiers by 20,000 by 2024.

=== Russian attack on Ukraine and "Zeitenwende" ===
On 27 February 2022, three days after the 2022 Russian invasion of Ukraine, German Chancellor Olaf Scholz gave his "Zeitenwende speech", in which he announced that Germany would use a €100 billion off-budget fund to significantly increase military spending. In May 2025, a new government under Chancellor Friedrich Merz took office and further amplified this new course of military expansion. Planned already before, but greatly accelerated by the attack on Ukraine, Germany permanently deployed troops abroad for the first time since World War II, with Merz inaugurating the 45th Panzer Brigade, a 4,800-soldier heavy combat brigade – including 200 civilian staff – in Lithuania on May 22, 2025, as part of NATO's eastern flank reinforcement.

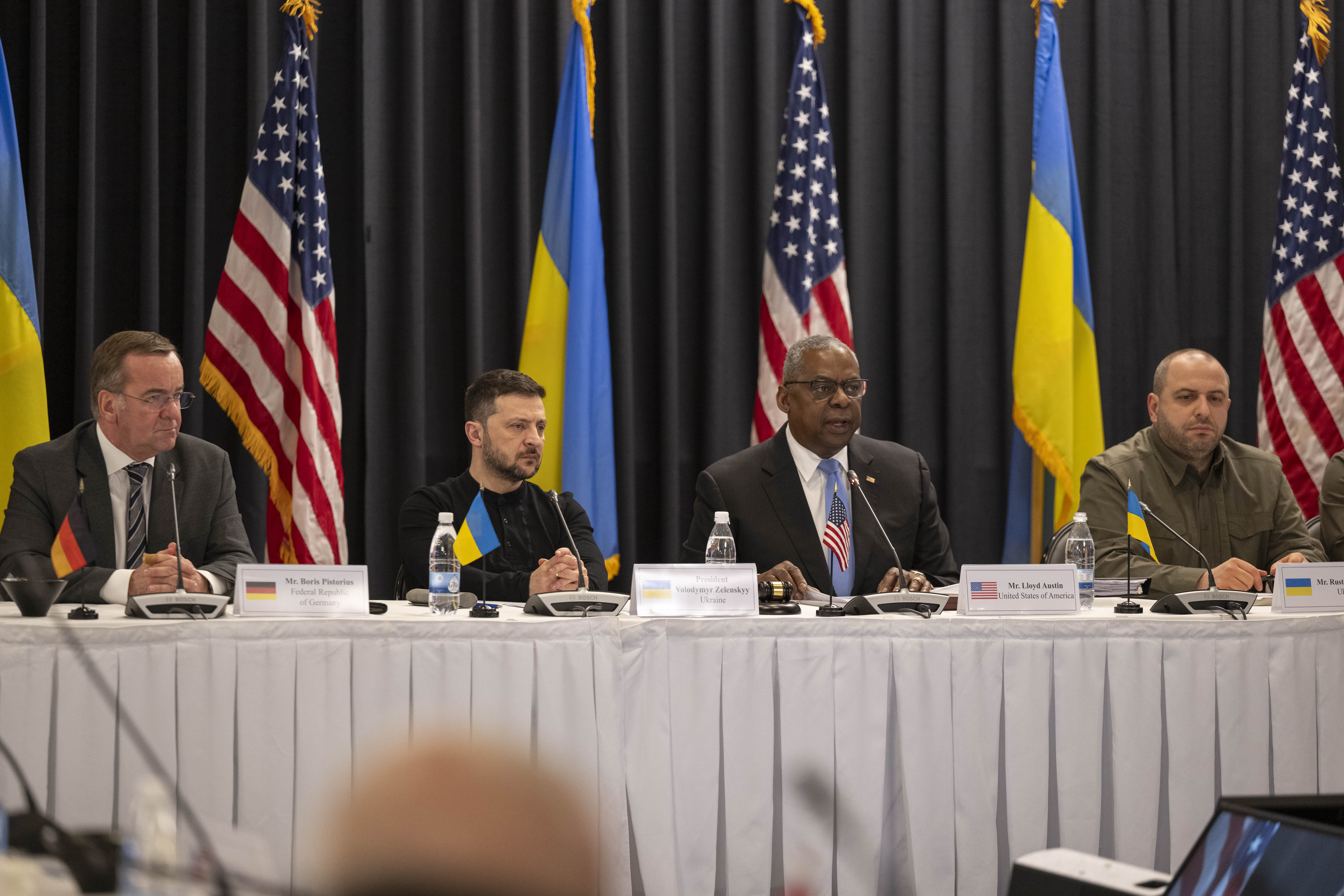
German Defense Minister Boris Pistorius (left) at a meeting of the Ukraine Defense Contact Group at Ramstein Air Base in January 2025.

In 2025, the Merz government also passed laws to further significantly expand the Bundeswehr, both in materiel and personnel, with the future equipment of the German Army to include thousands of armored fighting vehicles. With this goal of making the Bundeswehr the "strongest conventional military in Europe", the annual military budget of Germany, which had been at its historic low of 1.1% GDP until 2018, is to grow to 3.5% in 2029 and 5% in 2035 (including 1.5% for militarily critical infrasctructure). A new push to gain more volunteers and mechanisms for compulsory drafting in case these efforts are insufficient ("Swedish model") came into force on January 1, 2026. The goal is to reach a number of 260,000 of active Bundeswehr personnel, a 30% increase from its 2025 number.

== Naval history ==
Several naval forces have operated in Germany at different times. See

- Prussian Navy, 1701–1867
- Reichsflotte (Fleet of the Realm), 1848–52
- North German Federal Navy, 1867–71
- Imperial German Navy, 1871–1918
- Reichsmarine, 1919–35
- Kriegsmarine, 1935–45
- German Mine Sweeping Administration, 1945 to 1956
- Bundesmarine, 1956 to 1994
- Volksmarine, the navy of East Germany, 1956–90
- German Navy, since 1995

== See also ==
- Wehrmacht
- German Army (German Empire)
- History of Germany
- Prussian Army
- List of wars involving Germany
- Bundeswehr
