= Future equipment of the German Army =

This page contains a list of equipment on order or planned to be ordered, which hasn't yet entered service in the German Army. Concerning equipment that has recently been adopted or is in the process of being adopted, this list here somewhat overlaps with the list in the article List of modern equipment of the German Army. The article "List of modern equipment of the German Army" contains a list of equipment currently in service with the German Army.

== Planned investments ==
As of August 2025, Germany plans to invest €355 billion in new equipment through 2041. These investments come on top of the special fund of €100 billion. This includes the following estimated budgets:

- German Army:
  - Communications equipment: €15.9 billion
  - Vehicles and accessories: €20.8 billion
  - Combat vehicles: €52.5 billion
  - Munitions: €70.3 billion
  - Field and logistics material: €20.9 billion
- German Navy:
  - Naval vessels and other equipment: €36.6 billion
- German Air Force:
  - Aircraft and missiles: €34.2 billion
  - Satellite communications: €13.3 billion

== Weapons ==
=== Small arms ===
| Model | Image | Origin | Type | Calibre | Notes |
Handguns
| CZ P-10C OR; CZ P13 | (Illustration) | Czech Republic | Semi-automatic pistol | 9×19mm Parabellum | Future standard issue pistol, successor of the P8A1. CZ pre-selected in July 2025, with a 186.000 pistols framework agreement expected and a first firm order of 62,000 pistols. The framework agreement was approved in November 2025, with a €100 million authorisation (including pistol, holster, carrying equipment). This would enable a purchase of 203,000 pistols The first order planned is for 65,000 pistols (€19 million). The P-10 C OR is the compact, optics-ready version of the P-10. The specific color option chosen is a desert tan. |
Land mines
| PARM 2 Deutsches Modell 22 (DM 22) | (Illustration) | Germany | Anti-tank off-route mine | – | Ordered to TDW in October 2023, as a replacement to the mines sent to Ukraine, for a delivery planned from 2026. Orders: 2,600 ordered for €68 million.; 10,000 on option that can be ordered in batches of 1,000 mines.; Performances: PARM 1: 2 to 40 m (2.2 to 43.7 yd); PARM 2: 4 to 100 m (4.4 to 109.4 yd) (improvement) |

=== Weapon stations ===
| Model | Image | Origin | Type | Calibre | Quantity | Notes |
|---|---|---|---|---|---|---|
| KNDS Deuutschland FLW 100 | | Germany | RCWS; Remote controlled weapon station | 7.62×51mm NATO | 740 (option for 2,232) | Competition for a new remote weapon station to equip future vehicles and to be equipped with the H&K MG5A1. Purchase approved in January 2025 for €50 million. They are replacing in a first phase the weapon stations sent to Ukraine. Options available for additional systems. |
| KNDS Deuutschland FLW 200 | | Germany | RCWS; Remote controlled weapon station | 7.62×51mm NATO / 12.7×99mm NATO / 40×53mm HV | 740 (option for 2,232) | Competition for a new remote weapon station to equip future vehicles and to be equipped with the H&K MG5A1. Purchase approved in January 2025 for €50 million. They are replacing in a first phase the weapon stations sent to Ukraine. Options available for additional systems. |
| Kongsberg Protector RS4 | | Norway | RCWS; Remote controlled weapon station | 7.62×51mm NATO / 12.7×99mm NATO / 40×53mm HV | N/A | Ordered in February 2026, to equip the CAVS (Patria 6×6). They will be able to carry MELLS LR2 missiles. |

== Base equipment ==
=== Uniforms of the Bundeswehr ===
==== Camouflage ====
| Model | Image | Origin | Pattern type | Environment / colours | Notes |
|---|---|---|---|---|---|
| Multitarn 6-Farben-Tarndruck | | Germany | Flecktarn | Universal | In July 2025, the German military announced that the Multitarn would replace the Flecktarn (5-Farben-Tarndruck) in 2028-29 as the future standard camo. |

=== Protection equipment ===
| Model | Image | Origin | Type | Quantity | Notes |
Helmets
| Hexonia | – | Germany | Combat Helmet | 328,000 | Future standard issue helmet, selected in June 2026, and contracted in July 2026. |

== Electronic equipment ==
| Model | Image | Origin | Type | Quantity | Notes |
|---|---|---|---|---|---|
| Thermis MK2 MR | – | Greece | Thermal imaging sights | 5800 (+ 9,200 in option) | Budget approved in November 2025 for 15,000 sights (€120 million) in a framework agreement. Orders: 5,800 |
| Explosion-proof GPS receivers | – | – | GPS receivers | 24,000 | Framework agreement for up to 24,000 GPS receivers over 7 years approved in October 2024. A first order for 6,000 systems approved in October 2024 for a value of €43 million. |
| Thales XTRAIM | – | France; Germany | Reflex sight | | Part of the Infantryman of the Future - Extended System" (IdZ-ES) of the German Army. Designed in France, to be assembled in Germany. |
| Safran MOSKITO TI™ | | Switzerland | Multifunction IR goggles (laser range finder, laser pointer, compass, inclinometers) | >1,000 | |
| Safran SHARPCROW | – | Switzerland | Multifunction IR goggles (electro-optical observation system: thermal imaging, low-light imaging, a direct optical day channel, target location capabilities and digital reporting functions) | – | |
| SysPi SpezKr; System Pistole Spezialkräfte | – | Germany | Tactical light for pistol | N/A | Tender launched for the purchase of 5,734 lighting modules for the Walther PDP (P14 and P14K). |

Equipment in development financed by the Bundestag but no order yet, or competition launched

== Indirect fire ==
| Model | Image | Origin | Type | Quantity | Notes |
Missile systems
| EuroPULS (KNDS Deutschland MARS 3) | | Israel; Germany; Italy | MLRS; Multiple launch rocket system | 5 | 5 PULS purchased in collaboration with the Netherlands to compensate for the 5 M270 transferred to Ukraine, the purchase was approved in December 2024. Contract signed with Elbit Systems in February 2025 for €55 million. Delivery expected in 2028, full operational capability for 2030. Note: GMLRS can't be launched from the PULS system, and the USA seem unwilling to approve its use. |
| EuroPULS (KNDS Deutschland MARS 3); ZukSysIndF gRw; Zukünftiges System Indirektes Feuer großer Reichweite | | Israel; Germany; Italy | MLRS; Multiple launch rocket system | Up to 500 | Successor of the MARS 2 (M270), and expansion of the long range artillery capabilities of the German Army. Weapons qualified: Elbit ACCULAR, 122 mm, 35 km (22 mi) range; Elbit / Diehl EXTRA, 150 km (93 mi) range; Elbit Predator HAWK 300 km (190 mi) rangePlanned weapons: Kongsberg NSM; MBDA Deutschland JFS-M; 3SM Tyrfing; Saab GLSDB Based on an armoured Iveco Trakker GTF3 8×8 chassis, with a German made cab. |
| JFS-M; Joint Fire Support Missile | | Germany | Ground launched cruise missile | N/A | Development ongoing with MBDA Deutschland GmbH, KMW and ESG for an artillery ammunition to equip the future multiple rocket launchers. It is a maneuverable, low altitude, stealthy missile, with a range of 499 km. An EMP warhead has been shown as a potential weapon for this missile. It is based on the Taurus KEPD 350. Potential capability as a loitering munition. |
| Typhon missile system | | United States | Transporter erector launcher | 3 | On July 15, 2025, the German Minister of Defense announced that Germany had submitted a purchase request to the U.S. government for an undisclosed number of systems. A purchase decision will be made as soon as this is confirmed. In October 2025, plans to purchase 3 systems to launch Tomahawk missiles for €220 million. |
| Tomahawk Block Vb | | United States | Ground launched cruise missile | 400 | In October 2025, plans to purchase for €1.15 billion of missiles. |
Cannon artillery
| RCH-155; Zukünftiges System Indirektes Feuer mittlere Reichweite (ZukSysIndF mRw) | | Germany | SPH; Self propelled howitzer | 83 (+ 149 planned) | The framework agreement is for a total of 500 RCH-155, in order to enable export at fixed conditions. Orders: 4 prototypes (3 for Germany, 1 for the UK); 80 in December 2025, delivery planned for 2028 - 2030; complementary order for 149 expected in 2026 |
| PzH 2000A4 | | Germany | SPH; Self propelled howitzer | Up to 54 | Up to 54 under discussion with the government for Germany and Ukraine. |
Mortars
| Patria 6×6 NEMO; Zukünftiges System Indirektes Feuer kleiner Reichweite (ZukSysIndF kRw) | | Finland; Germany | Mortar carrier | 69 (+ option for 61) | Project approved in December 2025, budget for the development of the system approved for €50 million, and the procurement of systems to be used for the qualification trials. 69 ordered in December 2025 with an option for 61 more. Vehicle developed by Patria Finland, and to be produced partially in Germany. |

Equipment in development financed by the Bundestag but no order yet, or competition launched

== Vehicles ==
=== Main battle tanks ===
| Model | Image | Origin | Type | Quantity | Notes |
|---|---|---|---|---|---|
| Leopard 2A8 | | Germany | Main battle tank | 123 | Initial intent to replace 18 Leopard 2 A6 transferred to Ukraine and restart tank production. Framework agreement signed in May 2023 for 123 tanks. Orders: 18 ordered in May 2023 for €525.6 million + an option for 105 additional tanks for €2.9 billion.; 105 additional tanks approved for order by the parliament in July 2024.; Planned orders: 75 additional tanks planned to be ordered in 2026. |
| Leopard 2A6 A3 - driver school Leopard 2A7V - driver school | | Germany | Driver training tanks | 16 L2A6 A3; 8 L2A7V (+ option for 32) | Budget of €192 million approved by the Bundestag in November 2023. It is to be financed from the special fund of €100 billion. The delivery is expected in 2026–29. An option for 32 additional driver training tanks for €277 million (this tranche can be used for foreign clients). |
| Leopard 2A8 / Leopard 2AX | | Germany | Main battle tank | + 1,000 | The German Army plans to purchase up to 1,000 additional tanks. It is unclear whether the German Army will purchase additional Leopard 2A8. The Army mentioned a likely need for an intermediate tank needed until the MGCS is ready. And part of the 1,000 tanks would be the MGCS. |

Equipment in development financed by the Bundestag but no order yet, or competition launched
Potential equipment in a middle-term future

=== Armoured fighting vehicles, armoured personnel carriers and reconnaissance vehicles ===
| Model | Image | Origin | Type | Quantity | Notes |
Tracked vehicles
| Schützenpanzer Puma | | Germany | Infantry fighting vehicle | 254 | Framework agreements: December 2022, approval for 229 Puma; December 2025, volume approved increased to 254 vehicles; Orders: 50 Puma S1 ordered in May 2023, deliveries initially planned for 2025-2027.; 200 Puma S2 ordered in December 2025, deliveries planned from 2028, under conditions that the reliability issues are solved. |
Wheeled vehicles
| GTK Boxer - Schakal | | Germany; Netherlands | Infantry fighting vehicle | 185 (+ 200 option) | Budget for the purchase of 150 vehicles approved in October 2025, followed the same month by an order in common with the Netherlands. The contract includes an option for 200 vehicles. Budget for the purchase of additional systems approved in June 2026. The order for 35 vehicles was placed in August 2026. Design: KNDS Deutschland uses the unmanned turret of the Puma, the RCT30 with this vehicle for median forces, equipped with: MK 30-2/ABM; MELLS (Spike LR / Spike LR2); HK MG5 (7.62×51mm NATO) |
| Mowag Piranha V 6×6 - Luchs 2 | (illustration) | Switzerland; Germany | Scout vehicle | 274 (first batch) (+ 82 in option) | Budget of €3.5 billion approved in October 2024 for the replacement of the Fennek, contract signed the same month. Delivery of the vehicles ordered planned by 2032, and the serial production expected to start in 2029. Design: Chassis: Mowag Piranha V 6×6; Rheinmetall CT-025 stabilised turret; Rheinmetall Oerlikon KBA (25×137mm); Observation mast; Command / communications system (D-LBO) |
| GTK Boxer JFSTsw | | Germany; Netherlands | Observation, reconnaissance and fire command | 2 prototypes (+ 79 in option) | Two prototypes ordered in October 2021, one in each variant, with an option for 79 vehicles. The variants include: JFST - ground-to-ground; JFST - air-to-groundDesign: Boxer A2 drive module; Mission modules: Observation mast Thales PAAG JFS ("Panoramic Above Armor Gimbal Joint Fire Support"); Assisted Target Detection (ATD) system and in target tracking by an Automatic Video Tracking (AVT) system; Elbit Systems’ ELAWS laser warning system; Communication system planned (for artillery / aircraft target information transmission); Hybrid navigation system to improve navigation capability; RCWS; As of March 2026, up to 200 are expected to be ordered. |
| ATF Dingo 2 (A4.1) | | Germany | Infantry mobility mine-resistant ambush protected vehicle | 115 | Framework agreement for 233 vehicles signed. Orders: November 2023, the Bundestag approved the purchase of 50 Dingo after 50 were supplied to the Ukrainian Army (€147 million).; December 2024, approval for the purchase of 65 additional Dingo 2 A4.1 (GFF3), ordered in January 2025, to equip the Lithuania brigade.; Design: the vehicles will be equipped with radio (D-LBO) and navigation equipment (ERGR 2). |
| GTK Boxer GBF | – | Germany; Netherlands | Command vehicle | N/A | As part of the variants of the Boxer planned for the German Army, there are additional command Boxer vehicles. |
| GTK Boxer (all variants) | | Germany; Netherlands | Multi-role vehicle | 3,000 | The German Army plans to purchase additional Boxer vehicles. As of early July 2025, the German Army estimated a requirement of up to 2,500 Boxer in different variants. By the end of July 2025, that number was raised to 3,000. Note: all the Boxer ordered since July 2025 are part of the 3,000 Boxers. |

Potential equipment in a middle-term future

=== Special forces vehicles ===
| Model | Image | Origin | Type | Quantity | Notes |
|---|---|---|---|---|---|
| TAHR-le LL EGF leichten Luftlande-Einsatz-/Gefechtsfahrzeugen | | Israel; Germany | Light airborne combat vehicles | 40 (+ 110 in option) | Tender published in September 2024 for light airborne vehicles for the KSK. Budget approved, and framework agreement signed in October 2025. The vehicles will be made under licence in Germany, under a Joint Venture named Flensburg Technology Systems GmbH (FFG and IAI ELTA). The vehicle is based on the Z-family of vehicles from IAI Elta |
| TAHR-le LL UstgFzg leichtes Luftlande-Unterstützungsfahrzeug | | Israel; Germany | Light airborne support vehicles | 14 (+ 36 in option) | Tender published in September 2024 for light airborne vehicles for the KSK. Budget approved, and framework agreement signed in October 2025. The vehicles will be made under licence in Germany, under a Joint Venture named Flensburg Technology Systems GmbH (FFG and IAI ELTA). The vehicle is based on the Z-family of vehicles from IAI Elta |
| Defenture Mammoth AGF 2 Aufklärungs- und Gefechtsfahrzeug | | Netherlands | Medium reconnaissance and combat vehicle | 26 | Tender in 2019 for up to 80 special forces vehicles and 4 prototypes based on a single chassis. In June 2021, the Bundestag approved the budget to purchase the vehicles, they intend to replace the AGF Serval and the ESK Wolf. In August 2021, the Defenture Mammoth (GRF 5.12, 9 tons) was selected and prototypes were ordered. In April 2024, the 4 prototypes were handed over. 49 to be ordered of the 80 vehicles framework agreement + 31 in option, in 3 variants: AGF 2; UFK; Fire support with the M621 20 mm automatic cannonPurchase of the vehicles approved in December 2025. |
| Defenture Mammoth UFK; Unterstützungsfahrzeuge Kommando Spezialkräfte | | Netherlands | Medium tactical special forces support vehicle | 15 | |
| Defenture Mammoth AGF-2 FSV; Fire support vehicle | | Netherlands | Fire support vehicle | 8 | |

=== Utility vehicles and unarmoured personnel carriers ===
| Model | Image | Origin | Type | Quantity | Notes |
|---|---|---|---|---|---|
| Wolf 2 (G-class W464 Series) | | Austria; Germany | Utility vehicle | 3,249 (+ 2,551 in option) | Framework agreement for 5,800 Mercedes G-Class signed in July 2024 for €1.34 billion to be manufactured in Graz. The vehicles from the framework agreement are to be delivered by 2032. Firm orders: July 2024: 1,205 vehicles, €240 million for the vehicles, €292 with the command and navigation equipment added: 90 military police vehicles; 1,105 command vehicles in 2 variants: D-LBO MTN-A3 (Mobile Tactical Node); D-LBO MTC-F4 (Mobile Tactical Client); December 2024: 300 vehicles approved for purchase: military police vehicles; command vehicles; December 2025: 1,744 vehicles, €380 million, approved for purchase. |

== Logistics ==
| Model | Image | Origin | Type | Quantity | Notes |
Unarmoured trucks
| Mercedes Arocs 6×6 (BwFPS NLK 3-10t WR hümS) | | Germany; France | Transport truck | ~ 500 | Ordered by BwFuhrparkService in June 2025. Equipped with a 15-foot swap-body platforms. |
| MAN TGS 8×4 Rollende Tankstelle | – | Austria; Germany | Airfield fuelling tank truck | 48 | Refuelling truck supplied by Esterer GmbH & Co. KG ordered in 2022. |
Truck equipment and trailers
| Swap bodies | (Illustration) | – | Swap-bodies for trucks | 1,750 (+ 2,250 in option) | Framework agreement for up to 4,000 swap-bodies for transport of equipment approved in October 2024. The swap bodies are used to transport non-containerized general cargo, and radio cabins. Orders: Initial order for 1,750 swap-bodies for €42 million.Deliveries: 1,750 from 2025 to 2027. |
| Trailers 2-wheel 3.5 tons | – | – | All-terrain trailers | 600 | Framework agreement for up to 9,700 trailers approved in October 2024. Orders: October 2024, value of €82 million: 600 all-terrain trailers; 1,680 partially militarised 4-wheel trailers. Contract signed with Schmitz Cargobulla |
| Trailers 4-wheel 12.5 tons | – | Germany | Swap-body trailers | 1,680 | Framework agreement for up to 9,700 trailers approved in October 2024. Orders: October 2024, value of €82 million: 600 all-terrain trailers; 1,680 partially militarised 4-wheel trailers. Contract signed with Schmitz Cargobulla |
Handling equipment
| Multifunktionalen Feldumschlaggeräten (MUFFEL) | (Illustration) | – | All-terrain telescopic handler | 1,000 | Successor planned of the FUG 1.5t and 4t as of May 2026. The tender launched is for a 15-year framework agreement for up to 1,000 systems, their tools (attachments), spare parts, training and documentation. Capacity: s4-ton moving and lifting capacity; 20-foot standard container loading and unloading; All-wheel drive, road approved, capable of a speed ≥ 40 km/h; F-93 fuelThe order: 594 firm order, all delivered by 2032; 406 as an option |

Order not confirmed yet by the Bundestag

== Engineering equipment ==
=== Combat engineering equipment ===
| Model | Image | Origin | Type | Quantity | Notes |
|---|---|---|---|---|---|
| Brückensysteme Rad MKr | | Germany | AVLB; Armoured vehicle-launched bridge | N/A | Competitors: KMW WFEL Boxer; KNDS Leguan (26 m or 2 × 14 m) on a 10×10 Tatra Phoenix (also possible on RMMV HX trucks).; GDELS Anaconda MLC80+ (22 m or 2 × 12 m): RMMV HX2 8×8 (with unarmoured cabin); RMMV HX2 10×10 (with armoured cabin) |

Potential equipment in a middle-term future

=== Recovery vehicles and cranes ===
| Model | Image | Origin | Type | Quantity | Notes |
|---|---|---|---|---|---|
| Bergemittel MKr | – | Germany | ARV; Armoured recovery vehicle | N/A | Competitors: Boxer ARV with the FFG module; RMMV HX2 8×8 |

Potential equipment in a middle-term future

=== Engineering equipment ===
| Model | Image | Origin | Type | Quantity | Notes |
Bridging equipment
| M3 EVO; Schwimmschnellbrücke 2 | | Germany | Pontoon bridge | 66 | Budget approved in October 2025 for the development of the successor of the M3 Amphibious Rig, these will be provided by GDELS Deutschland. Contract signed at the end of October for €53 million, with a total budget of €331 million. |
| KMW Dry support bridge | | United Kingdom | 46 meters bridge | – | Project TYRO. |
| Faun M150 Trackway | | Germany; United Kingdom | Aluminium matting system | – | MLC 150 class. |

Equipment in development financed by the Bundestag but no order yet, or competition launched
Potential equipment in a middle-term future

== Specialised equipment and vehicles ==
=== Communications equipment ===
| Model | Image | Origin | Type | Quantity | Notes |
MKK "Mobiler Kommunikationsknoten"
| Piranha V 8×8 StratCom – "Richtfunkpanzer"; TaWAN LBO Richtfunkmanagement, klein | | Switzerland; Germany | Mobile armoured communication node | 58 (+ 198 option) | €1.9 billion budget approved in January 2025, ordered in February 2025. Delivery planned for end 2026 - end 2029. |
| TLRg; TaWAN LBO Richtfunkmanagement, groß | – | Germany | Mobile armoured communication node | 51 (+ 337 option) | €1.9 billion budget approved in January 2025, ordered in February 2025. Delivery planned for end 2026 - end 2029. Likely made of: 1 RMMV HX2 8×8 armoured truck equipped with SMAG Fth 40/9 mast system and the same radio system as the TLRk selected above; 1 RMMV HX2 8×8 armoured truck equipped with a container with control elements |
| TLRt und TLKt; TaWAN LBO Richtfunkmanagement, tragbar und Tragbare LBO Komponenten | – | Germany | Portable communication node | 0 (+ 200 option) | €1.9 billion budget approved in January 2025. |
| TFI Fz; TaWAN Führungs Interface Fahrzeug | – | Germany; Netherlands | Command vehicle | 10 (+ 59 option) | €1.9 billion budget approved in January 2025. Delivery planned in 2029. Potential offer: Boxer |
Radio relay
| DND BNET HCLOS as part of the TaWAN LBO RifuMgmt; TaWAN Richtfunkmanagement | – | Germany | Radio relay | – | Dynamit Nobel Defence subcontracted by Rheinmetall. |
Communication equipment for vehicles and command centers
| L3Harris Falcon III AN/PRC-117G(V)1(C) | – | United States | Multiband Networking Manpack Radio (software defined) | 2,900 | Approved for purchase in September 2024 for €351.4 million. Part of the D-LBO programme, to equip airborne troops, joint fire support teams, special forces and specialized units that need to communicate with allied troops. Firm orders: April 2025 |
| L3Harris Falcon III AN/PRC-160(V) | – | United States | Wideband HF/VHF Manpack Radio | 3,300 | Approved for purchase in September 2024 for €351.4 million. Part of the D-LBO programme, to equip airborne troops, joint fire support teams, special forces and specialized units that need to communicate with allied troops. Firm orders: April 2025 |
| Rohde & Schwarz Soveron Family | – | Germany | Digital VHF / UHF radios (Manpack, Handeheld, mobile) | 20,000 | |
| Thales TRC 9215-HD | – | France | VHF manpack radio | – | Part of the Thales PR4G family. |
| Thales TRC 9315-HD | – | France | VHF vehicular station | – | Part of the Thales PR4G family. |
| Thales SYNAPS-H | – | France; Germany | Portable radio | – | |

=== Radars ===
| Model | Image | Origin | Type | Quantity | Notes |
|---|---|---|---|---|---|
| Thales Deutschland GO12; Ground Observer 12 | – | Germany | Ground surveillance radar | 60 | Ordered in May 2026. |

=== Electronic warfare ===
| Model | Image | Origin | Type | Quantity | Notes |
|---|---|---|---|---|---|
| Mowag Piranha V - KnifeFish; Geschützte Systeme zum Stören von gegnerischer Kommunikation (GeSys SgK) | (Illustration) | Switzerland; Germany; Netherlands | Electronic warfare attack (jamming / counter-measures) | 20 | Two variants approved for purchase for €400 million (including the design). The jamming will be focused on communications system (HF, VHF, UHF) and navigation. The jamming equipment is to be supplied by Hensoldt. They will replace the Hornisse and the Hummel. |
| Scorpius-G (ELL-8256SB); Scorpius-T (ELL-8257SB) | – | Israel; Germany | Scorpius-G Long-distance RFEW, ESM / ECM; Scorpius-T Electronic warfare training system | – | Systems to be made by MBDA Deutschland and IAI. Scorpius-G: System equipped with a powerful AESA antenna. It is made of highly sensitive and power effective GaN TRMs (Gallium-Nitride Transmitter and Receiver ModuleS).: ESM mission: Capable to Detect, distort and degrade enemy radars, and able to keep its effectiveness despite lobe switching.; ECM mission: Intercepts, analyzes, locates, tracks and jams radars (airborne, ground FCR, AEW, SAR)Scorpius-T: Training system for aircrews and for EW operators. It can emulate a wide variety of scenarios that include realistic, signal dense, realistic environment, including for 5th generation jet fighters. |

Potential equipment in a middle-term future

=== Data centers ===
| Model | Image | Origin | Type | Quantity | Notes |
|---|---|---|---|---|---|
| German Mission Network Block 1 | – | Germany | Modular and scalable data centers | – | Approved in 2024 by the parliament, ordered in January 2025 to BWI GmbH. |

=== Medical equipment ===
| Model | Image | Origin | Type | Quantity | Notes |
|---|---|---|---|---|---|
| Highly mobile protected medical facilities - NATO Role 2B; Geschützte, hochmobile Sanitätseinrichtungen Role 2B (ghmSanEinrR2B) | – | Germany | Rescue stations | 6 (+ 18 in option) | Framework agreement approved in September 2025 for 24 units, 6 approved for purchase, 2 additional expected for the Lithuania brigade. Contract signed with Rheinmetall in October 2025, first delivery for 2029. Each Role 2B unit consists of eleven armoured vehicles equipped with multifunctional containers that serve as surgical, treatment, and monitoring units. |
| Armoured rescue stations - NATO Role 1 Modularen Sanitätseinrichtungen (MSE) | – | Germany | Armoured rescue stations | 127 | Framework agreement in December 2024 for 86 armoured rescue stations. They are to be supplied by Rheinmetal, and used for initial emergency surgical and internal medical care. Each rescue station is made of two swap-body containers that expand on both sides, tripling volume. The trucks are parked back to back. An airlock is installed in between. Firm orders: 10 ordered in December 2024; 117 ordered in August 2026 (after a budget approval in July 2026) |
| Unarmoured rescue stations - NATO Role 1 Modularen Sanitätseinrichtungen (MSE) | – | Germany | Rescue stations | 43 | Framework agreement in December 2024 for 34 armoured rescue stations. They are to be supplied by Rheinmetal, and used for initial emergency surgical and internal medical care. Each rescue station is made of two swap-body containers that expand on both sides, tripling volume. The trucks are parked back to back. An airlock is installed in between. Firm orders: 6 ordered in December 2024; 37 ordered in August 2026 (after a budget approval in July 2026) |

=== Emergency vehicles ===
| Model | Image | Origin | Type | Quantity | Notes |
|---|---|---|---|---|---|
| Rosenbauer Panther 8×8 | | Austria; Germany; Sweden | Fire tender | 35 (+ 25 in option) | In June 2024, framework agreement for up to 60 airfield firefighting vehicles approved by the Budget Committee of the Bundestag for a value of €130 million. Orders: July 2024, 35 vehicles for €84.1 million: 23 defensive fire protection (military painting); 12 basic operations/national and alliance defence; Delivery planning: 2 in 2026, 11 each year from 2027 to 2029. The vehicles will be equipped with a 12.5 m^{3} water tank, it is based on a Volvo chassis. |

== Army air defences ==
| Model | Image | Origin | Type | Quantity | Notes |
Missile air defence
| Boxer + IRIS-T SLS; Flugabwehrraketenpanzer (FlaRakPz) + Boxer; Feuerleiterpanzer (FltPz); NNbS program TP1 (Nah- und Nächstbereichs-schutz Teilprojektes 1) | – | Germany | SHORAD SAM; Short-range air defence, surface-to-air missile | 4 fire units (32 launchers) | Subproject 1 of the NNbS programme. The request of the Bundeswehr for the composition of each fire unit was: 1 medium range platoon, 2 launch vehicles, 1 radar, 1 command post; 2 short range platoons, each made of 3 launch vehicles, 1 tactical command vehicle; Logistic and support vehicles; ARGE NNbS (joint venture including Diehl Defence, Rheinmetall Electronics and Hensoldt Sensors) offered the following solution for this phase of the programme.: Vehicle: Boxer; Missile: 6 IRIS-T SLS; Mast with IFF and a radar (3D, 360°, AESA): Saab Giraffe Lightweight 1X; Hensoldt Spexer Lightweight; C2 system: Airbus Fortion IBMS ("Integrated Battle Management Software"); Note: a fire unit is designed to protect one brigade, which corresponds to an area of 20 km (12 mi) × 20 km (12 mi), 400 km^{2} (150 sq mi) in a high intensity warfare context. |
| Boxer + IRIS-T SLS | – | Germany | SHORAD SAM; Short-range air defence, surface-to-air missile | 68 launchers | A total of 100 launchers is expected. |
| IRIS-T SLS missiles | | Germany; Italy; Sweden; Greece; Norway; Spain | SHORAD SAM; Short-range air defence, surface-to-air missile | Up to 18,000 missiles | The German Army plans to purchase ammunition for 30 reloads of its air defence systems. The standard load is made of 6 missiles. |
Skyranger 30 and ammunition
| Skyranger 30A3; NNbS programme TP3 (Nah- und Nächstbereichs-schutz Teilprojektes 3) | | Switzerland; Germany | SPAAG SHORAD; Self-propelled anti-air gun, short-range air defence | 19 (+ 30 in option) | Contract signed in February 2024 for: 1 prototype + 18 serial production systems (€595 million); + 30 systems in optionDesign: Platform: Boxer; Turet: Skyranger 30, equipped with: Oerlikon KCE; AHEAD airburst ammo (30×173mm); 9 × MBDA DefendAir missiles; Sensors: Hensoldt Spexer 2000M 3D MkIII radar; FIRST ("Fast InfraRed Search and Track"); TREO compact target tracker (1 HD cooled MWIR thermal camera, 1 HD camera; two laser rangefinders, one for air targets one for land targets; Complementary elements: 8 MAN 15 t armoured resupply trucks; 8 workshops; 18 training systems |
| Rheinmetall 30mm AHEAD | | Switzerland; Germany | 30×173 mm airburst ammunitions | – | Two variants exist: PMC388, 162 sub-projectiles; PMC455, smaller sub-projectiles configured for C-UAS |
| MBDA DefendAir | | Germany | V/SHORAD missile | – | Missile ordered for the Skyranger 30, with 9 missiles per vehicle. It was selected as the Class 1 UAS anti-drone missile. Budget for the development and production of the missile approved in November 2025 (€490 million). Serial production expected in 2029. |
| Skyranger 30A3 | | Switzerland; Germany | SPAAG SHORAD; Self-propelled anti-air gun, short-range air defence | + 561 | |
| Rheinmetall 30mm AHEAD | | Switzerland; Germany | 30×173 mm airburst ammunitions | – | The German Army plans to purchase ammunition for 30 reloads of its air defence systems. The Skyranger 30 carries 300 rounds. |
| MBDA DefendAir | | Germany | V/SHORAD missile | Up to 156,600 missiles | The German Army plans to purchase ammunition for 30 reloads of its air defence systems. The standard load is made of 9 missiles (580 Skyranger 30A3). |
Drone air defence
| TYTAN Interceptor B | – | Germany | UAV / FPV interceptor | – | Selected by Germany to intercept drones above military and civilian infrastructure in peace time. |
Air defence command
| Mowag Eagle V (4×4 and 6×6) + UTF WLS; High Mobility SHORAD Squad, part of the NNbS program TP1 (Nah- und Nächstbereichs-schutz Teilprojektes 1) | (illustration) | Switzerland; Germany | C2 SHORAD SAM; Command and control, short-range air defence, surface-to-air missile | – | Subproject 1 of the NNbS programme. On top of the, the SWS (SLS Weapon System) of the High mobility SHORAD Squad, additional equipment are planned: CPV, the Close-in Protection Vehicle, a Mowag Eagle V 4×4 equipped with a heavy remote weapon station (30 mm cannon + anti-tank missile) to protect SHORAD squads against UAV and ground ennemi.; CCL, Command, Control & Liaison, a fire unit command Air battle management based on a Mowag Eagle V 4×4 or 6×6. It aims at coordinating 6 Squads; REL, a reloader truck to support all vehicles of the squad with consumables and munitions. It would be likely based on Mercedes Zetros for its high tactical mobility. |

Equipment in development financed by the Bundestag but no order yet, or competition launched
Potential equipment in a middle-term future

== Trains ==
| Model | Image | Origin | Type | Quantity | Notes |
|---|---|---|---|---|---|
| Siemens ICE | — | Germany | Medical trains | 3 | The German Army is planning to purchase medical trains based on the ICE. |

Potential equipment in a middle-term future

== Unmanned aerial vehicles ==
| Model | Image | Origin | Type | Role | Quantity | Notes |
Loitering munitions
| Helsing HX-2 | | Germany | Fixed-wing UAV; Unmanned aerial vehicle | AI enabled, attack drone | – | Ordered in February 2026. AI targetting capabilities. Range: 100 km (62 mi). |
| STARK OWE-V; One Way Effector - Vertical | – | Germany | Fixed-wing UAV; Unmanned aerial vehicle | AI enabled, attack drone | – | Ordered in February 2026. Exclusively German components. AI targeting capabilities.: Range:80 to 100 km (50 to 62 mi); Autonomy: 60 minutes |
Surveillance / reconnaissance
| Quantum Systems Twister | – | Germany | Fixed-wing UAV; Unmanned aerial vehicle | ISR; Intelligence, surveillance, and reconnaissance | 147 (+ 600 in option) | Successor of the EMT Aladin. Framework agreement for 747 drones approved and contract signed in December 2025. |

== See also ==
- German Army:
  - List of modern equipment of the German Army
- German Air Force:
  - List of active equipment of the German Air Force
- German Navy:
  - List of active German Navy ships
  - List of active aircraft of the German Navy
  - List of ship classes of the Bundesmarine and Deutsche Marine
  - List of ships of the German navies
  - Kommando Spezialkräfte Marine (German Navy special forces)
- Future equipment of the German Armed Forces:
  - Future equipment for the German Air Force
  - Future vessels of the German Navy
  - Future aircraft of the Marineflieger
- German Army equipment pages in German:
  - List of small arms of the Bundeswehr
  - List of Bundeswehr ammunition
  - List of wheeled vehicles of the Bundeswehr
  - List of tracked vehicles of the Bundeswehr
  - List of aircraft of the Bundeswehr
