= Joint Fire Support Missile =

European cruise missile

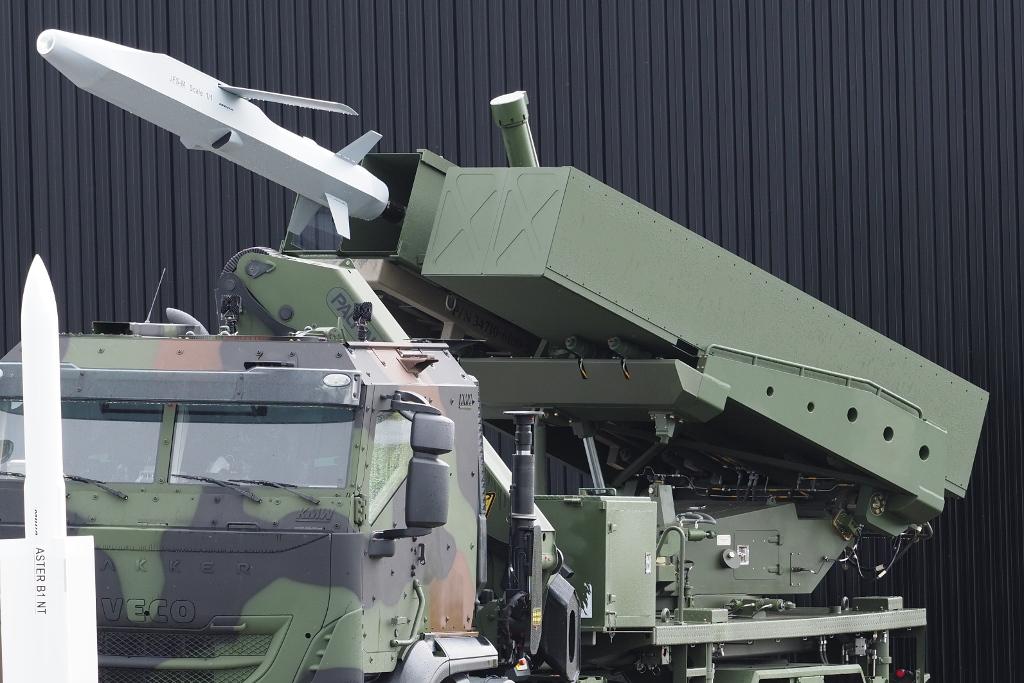
Euro-Puls with JFS-M.

The Joint Fire Support Missile (JFS-M) is a low cost ground launched cruise missile with a range of up to 499 km. European missile manufacturer MBDA designed this missile to be launched from the M270 MLRS launcher. It was first unveiled at the ILA 2022 show in Berlin. The JFS-M is based around the design of MBDA's RC100 small remote carrier, which the company is developing as part of the French, Germany and Spanish Future Combat Air System project.
