= Scorpius electronic warfare system =

Electronic warfare system

Scorpius is a defense weapon system designed to disrupt the communications and radar of UAVs, ships, missiles and more. It is being produced by Israel Aerospace Industries (IAI) Elta Systems subsidiary and was announced on November 12, 2021.

== Description ==
According to IAI more and more weaponry is centered around the electromagnetic realm, and this system is specifically designed to counteract those threats.

The Scorpius system designated ELL-8256SB represents the next-generation electronic warfare (EW) systems that Israel Aerospace Industries (IAI) developed. It works by directing narrowly targeted beams against specific targets. The systems intercepts, analyzes, locates, tracks, and jams various threats, including fire control radars, search radars, AEW sensors, and SAR. This Scorpius system is designed to not interfere with anyone other than the target. Covering a wide frequency range, this modular EW system can effectively create an EOB in real-time, Scorpius provides operators with a situational awareness picture and the means to counter a broad spectrum of radar threats. The system is capable of targeting multiple threats simultaneously and has unprecedented range.

Multiple Scorpius systems can be deployed in network mode to cover larger and more complex regions, providing a comprehensive and coordinated defense against electronic threats. One of IAI's VP's of marketing said that the name was intended to convey "the sense of an innocuous thing that actually has a very powerful sting."

== Design ==
As a family of systems, Scorpius provides comprehensive electronic support measures (ESM) and electronic countermeasures (ECM) capabilities for ground-based, naval, and airborne platforms. Scorpius utilizes Active Electronically Scanned Array (AESA) technology with Gallium-Nitride (GaN) Solid State Amplifiers (SSA) to deliver high receiver sensitivity and Effective Radiated Power (ERP) transmission.

The system employs AESA technology with GaN SSA and provides receiver sensitivity and ERP transmission, exceeding legacy EW solutions. This allows Scorpius to detect and engage a wider range of threats more accurately and effectively. AESA technology allows for narrow, simultaneous multi-beam operation, enabling the system to detect and target multiple threats across the entire field of regard. GaN technology enhanced receiver sensitivity increases ERP, enabling the Scorpius systems to detect, distort, and degrade enemy radars through their side lobes, greatly increasing their jamming effectiveness. Other features include the ability to track and intercept Low Probability of Intercept (LPI) radars, which are designed to be difficult to detect, and using jamming techniques using DRFM Digital Radio Frequency Memory (DRFM) techniques to counter various radar threats effectively.

The system can operate automatically, driven by a pre-programmed Mission Data File (MDF), allowing for rapid response and reduced operator workload. The system also has a real-time training mode, enhancing operator proficiency and mission readiness.

== Specifications ==
- Technology: Active Electronically Scanned Array (AESA)
- Amplifiers: Gallium-Nitride (GaN) Solid State Amplifiers (SSA)
- Key Capabilities: Electronic Support Measures (ESM), Electronic Countermeasures (ECM)
- Platforms: Ground-based (Scorpius-G), Naval (Scorpius-N), Airborne (Scorpius EJ)
- Deployment: Single unit or network mode (Scorpius-G)
- Threat Detection: Fire control radars, search radars, AEW sensors, SAR, missile seekers
- Jamming Techniques: Digital RF Memory (DRFM)

== Variants ==
=== Scorpius-G ===
Scorpius-G - a ground-based EW system designed for long-distance RF electronic countermeasures (ECM). It is typically mounted on a rotating pedestal and deployed on a truck or an all-terrain vehicle. Scorpius-G can be operated independently or deployed in network mode to cover larger, more complex regions, providing a protective hemisphere around ground assets.

=== Scorpius-N ===
Scorpius-N - the shipborne EW configuration of the ELL-8256SB system suite that combines advanced ECM and ESM capabilities. It comprises four conformal antenna array panels, each housing a transceiver array covering a wide frequency range. ITs configuration minimizes its contribution to the vessel's RCS, reducing the risk of detection by enemy radar.

=== Scorpius Escort Jammer (EJ) ===
The Scorpius Escort Jammer (EJ) is an airborne self-protection jammer pod based on the Scorpius ELL-8256SB architecture. It is designed to suppress air surveillance and fire control radars, creating a safe corridor along a mission flight path. The EJ allows for simultaneous transmission and receiving capabilities and is operated as a stand-alone system, enabling rapid transfer of EJ pods between aircraft.

Scorpius-SP

Designed to provide advanced ECM to individual aircraft. Mounted within ELTA’s compact, lightweight, and low drag pod configuration, which is similar in contour and weight to an air-to-air missile, the system can be installed on all wing stations.

=== Scorpius-T ===
Scorpius-T (ELL-8257SB) is a land-based AESA multi-threat EW emulator used for aircrew training and system testing and evaluation.

== Operational History ==
IAI's ELL-8256SB Scorpius family leverages AESA and GaN technology developed by ELTA for airborne, naval, and ground-based radar, communications, and EW systems, providing enhanced performance and effectiveness compared to legacy EW solutions. The Scorpius SP pod was introduced in 2021. In 2022, IAI received orders for Scorpius-SP Airborne Self-Protection jamming pods from an Asian customer and has partnered with Bharat Electronics Ltd. Of India to manufacture the pod in India.
