= 2020 German Assault Rifle System tender =

2017–2020 German army competition for a new service rifle

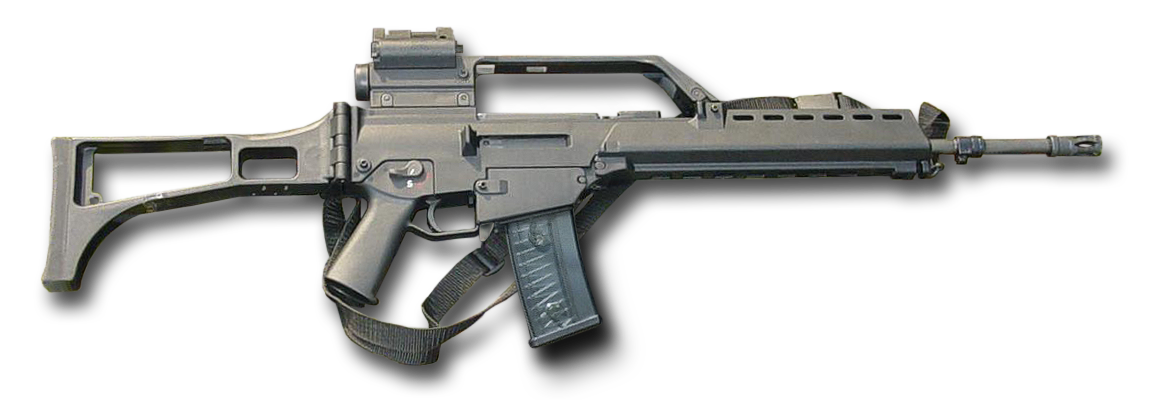
Heckler & Koch G36 assault rifle

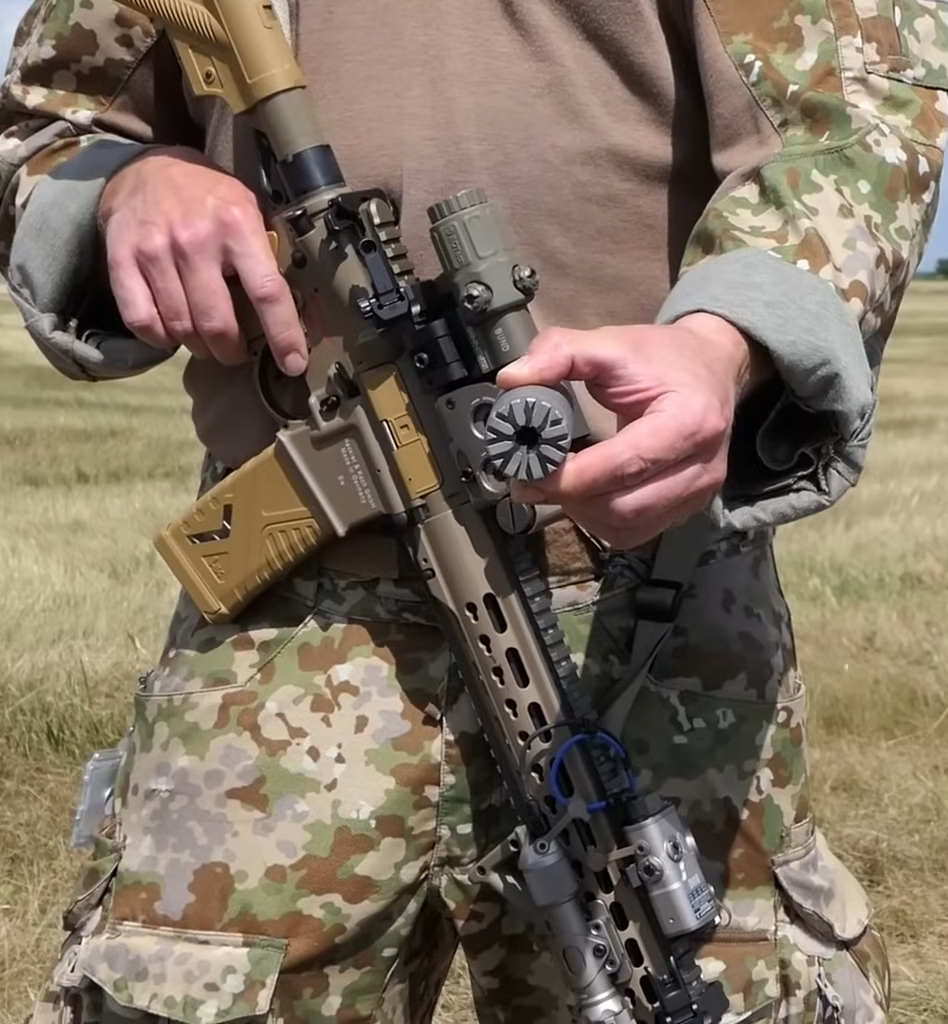
Heckler & Koch G95, which won the revised tender as a version of the HK416A8

The 2020 German Assault Rifle System tender (German: System Sturmgewehr Bundeswehr) refers to the 2017–2020 tender for the replacement of the Heckler & Koch G36 assault rifle as used by the Bundeswehr (the German armed forces). To replace the G36, the German Federal Ministry of Defence issued the "Assault Rifle System" tender. Although the Haenel MK 556 initially won the contract, the planned purchase was withdrawn on 9 October 2020 due to suspected breaches of public procurement law and alleged patent infringements by C.G. Haenel to the detriment of the competing bidder, Heckler & Koch.The German Federal Defence Minister Annegret Kramp-Karrenbauer (CDU) communicated this to the Defence Committee of the German Federal Parliament. The decision followed a crisis meeting with representatives of the procurement office, which will reassess the bidders' offers in light of this background.

On 14 October 2020, media reports emerged doubting patent infringements regarding the Bundeswehr MK 556 versions being offered by C.G. Haenel to the detriment of Heckler & Koch. Furthermore, reports regarding patent infringements by Haenel's German box magazine sub-supplier Oberland Arms to the detriment of Magpul Industries emerged. Oberland Arms polymer box magazines were commercially launched to European consumers in 2009. German media have tried to obtain more information from Magpul Industries and C.G. Haenel, but since 13 October 2020 no new information has appeared to substantiate magazine patent litigation.

On 2 March 2021, the German Federal Ministry of Defence officially announced that, after evaluating all submitted documents, it had excluded C.G. Haenel's offer from the award procedure and informed the company. The Ministry now intends to award the contract to Heckler & Koch. C.G. Haenel announced on 3 March 2021 that the federal government's decision would be reviewed and "all necessary legal steps will be taken to protect our interests". According to public procurement lawyers, the final decision on the new assault rifle could be delayed until all legal actions are exhausted. This may lead to compensation payments and delay any future contract award for years until the matter is settled. Within a week, German media started reporting on initiated legal actions as a result of the award revocation.

== Background to tender ==
On 21 April 2017, the German Ministry of Defence began its program by putting out a tender to look for a service rifle to replace the Heckler & Koch G36, which has been standard issue in the Bundeswehr since the 1990s. The main issue cited regarding the G36 was that it became inaccurate when overheated, either from continuous fire or extreme ambient temperatures.

The System Sturmgewehr Bundeswehr tender was calling for up to 120,000 new rifles including accessories with an estimated total worth of €245 million without VAT (the annual German defence budget for 2020 is €45.646 billion.) For the rifle to see production, a parliamentary consensus is required. The first set of rifles was scheduled for delivery in the final week of October 2020, while the weapons' laser sights, optics, and other attachments were expected in mid-December.

=== Tender requirements ===
Some of the requirements in the tender were a rifle chambered in 5.56×45mm NATO or 7.62×51mm NATO with:

- Ambidextrous controls
- A maximum weight of 3.6 kg (7.94 lb) without a magazine and aiming optics
- Box magazines with an empty maximum weight of 160 grams (5.6 oz)
- A receiver service life of at least 30,000 rounds (barrel 15,000 ball or 7,500 hard-core rounds)
- Interchangeable long- and short-barrel variants.
- Accessories including bayonet, sound suppressor, drum magazine, bipod, forward grip, special bolt for training cartridges, cartridge case catching bag, cleaning kit, carry sling, and transport bag.
- Being able to function in areas with climate categories A1-3, B1-3, C0-3, and M1-3 according to STANAG 4370 Environmental Testing Procedures without restriction (except electrical components).

The "Assault Rifle System" tender also stipulated that the technology used in the offers should not be subject to foreign approval or regulations from the International Traffic in Arms Regulations, an American set of laws that dictate the export of defense and military related technologies.

=== Tender participants ===
Several companies participated, including SIG Sauer with the SIG MCX and Rheinmetall/Steyr with the RS556, but both dropped out early. According to Die Zeit, SIG Sauer asserted that the tests were not impartial and that the company was given insufficient testing ammunition in response to its complaints. The only remaining companies were Heckler & Koch with two separate rifles, the HK416 (selected in October 2017 in a separate tender for limited use by the German KSK and KSM special forces), and the HK433, which combines features of the G36 and the HK416 families of assault rifles, and C.G. Haenel with the (second generation) MK 556.

In October 2018, none of the weapons submitted met the required technical criteria. Heckler & Koch and C.G. Haenel were given a deadline for further development. The tests of the improved weapons began on 18 February 2019 and were completed in the autumn of 2019, according to the modified plan. In 2019, Heckler & Koch criticized the Ministry of Defence for its strict requirements, claiming that no 5.56×45mm NATO-chambered rifle could meet them, while also alleging a lack of expertise and neutrality in the proceedings.

On 8 November 2019, the Federal German Armed Forces Technical Center for Weapons and Ammunition (WTD 91) stated in a final report that all the weapons presented had successfully passed the technical tests and met the Bundeswehr's technical requirements.

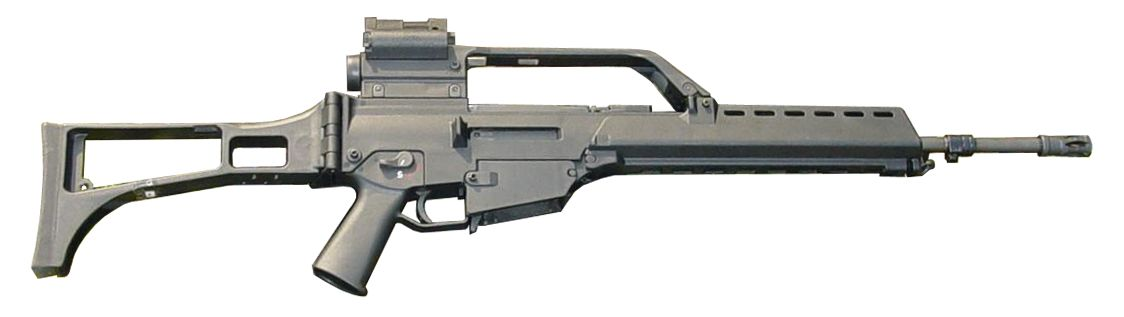
G36 service rifle to be replaced

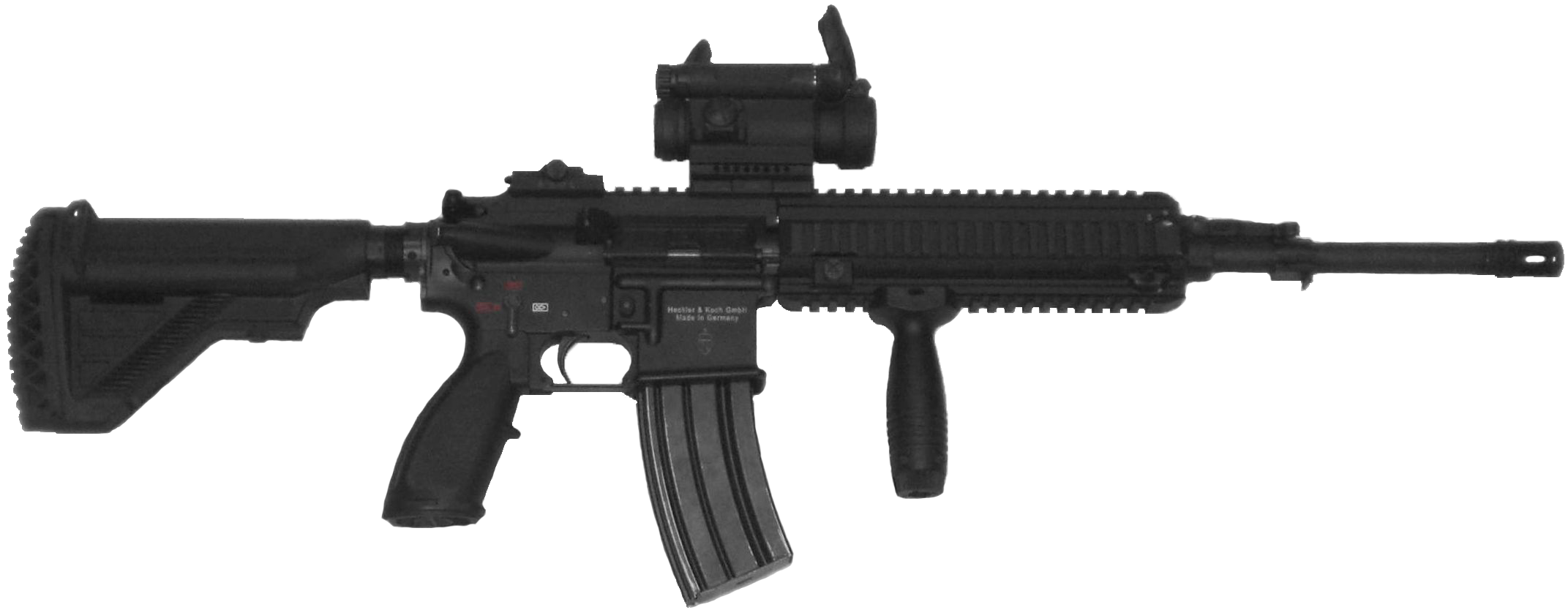
HK416 as issued by Norway. The HK416 is already in use by special forces units in the Bundeswehr.

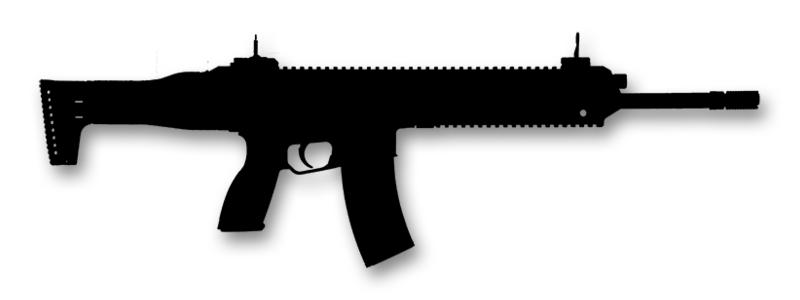
HK433

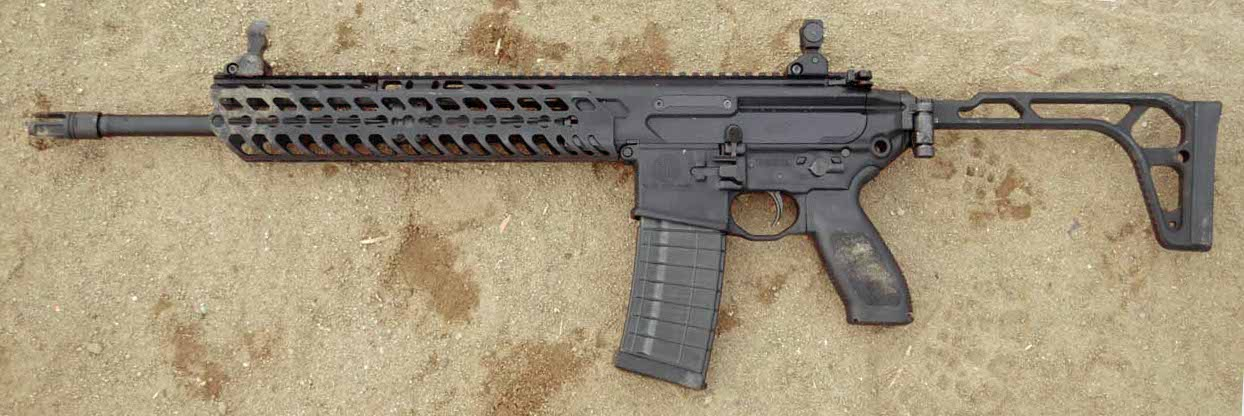
SIG MCX withdrawn from the tender

== Tender result ==
In September 2020, the MK 556 won the "Assault Rifle System" tender for the future service rifle of the Bundeswehr.

According to the German Press Agency (DPA), "C.G. Haenel presented a weapon that, in extensive tests, was somewhat better tailored to the requirements of the military and also proved to be economically advantageous."

The decision for the MK 556 was announced on 15 September 2020. The same day the decision was announced, the Ministry of Defence released an official statement:

"Assault Rifle System Bundeswehr": Winner of the tender when awarded

Berlin, 15 September 2020

The "assault rifle" (System Sturmgewehr Bundeswehr) award procedure has made another major step forward. From the now completed evaluation of the offers by the registration office of the procurement office in Koblenz, C.G. Haenel GmbH, limited liability company, emerged as the winner of the tender.

On 14 May 2020, the bidders remaining in the System Assault Rifle Basic Weapon award procedure were asked to submit a Best And Final Offer (BAFO); the bid submission deadline ended on 15 June 2020. Meanwhile, the contracting authority has evaluated the bids received.

From this evaluation, the C.G. Haenel GmbH, a limited liability company, emerged as the winner of the tender. The result of the evaluation is not yet legally effective. Legal recourse is always open to unsuccessful bidders.

The decision of the registry is also subject to parliamentary approval in the context of the €25 million bill. The documents required for this are currently being prepared, with the aim of a parliamentary referral at the end of 2020.

On 21 September 2020, C.G. Haenel announced it wanted to manufacture the rifles mainly in Germany. The German production share should be 90 percent and benefit the economic region in southern Thuringia.

== Legal challenges ==
On 15 September 2020, Heckler & Koch announced that it was examining legal steps regarding the decision.

On 24 September 2020, Heckler & Koch announced that the company had lodged a complaint with the procurement office against the outcome of the bidding process. The complaint can also be used later by the unsuccessful bidder to pursue further legal action against the award. According to Heckler & Koch, it had set a price well below the maximum volume, but Haenel had undercut it by a further €51 million.

On 29 September 2020, the Deutsche Presse-Agentur reported that Heckler & Koch took further legal action, effectively suspending the process. According to the DPA, Heckler & Koch's initial bid was €235 million, which was ultimately reduced to €179 million. The final offer from Haenel undercut Heckler & Koch's bid by about €50 million.

According to Business Insider, a leaked report issued on 5 October 2020 stated that Haenel offered the MK 556 assault rifles, including accessories, for around €152 million, including 19 percent VAT. Heckler & Koch offered their rifles for €179 million, making Haenel's final offer €27 million or 18 percent cheaper.

Regarding the choice, the secret report says:

The main criterion is the lower price, with a technically comparable performance.

The offered rifles all passed the Federal German Armed Forces Technical Center for Weapons and Ammunition (WTD 91) tests. The procurement office experts assess the overall project risk as "medium".

The intended contract with C.G. Haenel apparently includes several stringent clauses and regulations to protect the Bundeswehr against risks.

On 9 October 2020, the German Federal Ministry of Defence withdrew their intended award decision, seemingly leaving the potential remaining G36 replacements as either the HK416, HK433 or MK 556 after concluding a re-entered evaluation phase.

Regarding this decision, the Ministry of Defence issued the following statement (machine translated from German):

Assault rifle of the German Armed Forces: Status of the award procedure (published on 09.10.2020)

Based on the request for a review by the company Heckler & Koch received by the 1st Federal Procurement Chamber at the Federal Cartel Office on 30 September 2020, the Federal Procurement Office (BAAINBw Federal Office for Equipment, Information Technology and Use of the Bundeswehr) for the first time verified a possible patent infringement by the company C.G. Haenel GmbH with limited liability knowledge. The internal examinations conducted thereupon led to the conclusion that a corresponding patent infringement by the bidder C.G. Haenel GmbH with limited liability, at the expense of the bidder Heckler & Koch, could not be ruled out.

Against this background, the federal awarding authority was required to send the information letter (Section 134 GWB) to the bidders about the intended award of the contract to the company C.G. Haenel GmbH with limited liability.

The federal awarding authority will thus re-evaluate the offers, taking all aspects into account.

Since then, it has remained completely open which supplier will receive the "Assault Rifle System" contract and when a decision will be made. C.G. Haenel announced in late November 2020 that they had initiated appropriate legal steps. According to a letter to Bild from Haenel managing director Olaf Sauer,

the MK 556 is a different rifle with different design features compared with the CR 223 and not addressed in the patent lawsuit. The patented technology is not used in the MK 556.

According to a video produced by Heckler & Koch, important breech components of the CR 223 are interchangeable with the HK416. The video supports Heckler & Koch's allegation that the MK 556 infringed on its intellectual property rights.

To legally clarify whether Heckler & Koch's allegations were relevant to the Bundeswehr tender, an evidence preservation drive occurred at C.G. Haenel's headquarters in December 2020, under the orders of the Düsseldorf Regional Court, so that evidence could be secured for a patent lawsuit.

The Technical Center for Weapons and Ammunition (WTD 91), which tested the rifles offered by both companies, was also requested not to continue using the submitted test weapons and to store them.

On 18 December 2020, German media reported that a patent attorney commissioned by the Ministry of Defence concluded that C.G. Haenel had infringed other companies' patents in the submitted MK 556 weapon, which could subsequently exclude the company from the award. C.G. Haenel was given time until mid-January 2021 to comment on the results of the patent assessment, according to a Bundestag Defence Committee chairpersons' briefing.

A spokeswoman for the Ministry of Defence said:

By withdrawing the surcharge, we signaled that we had doubts regarding patent legislation. And the report that has now been submitted strengthens our view. But now the report still has to be evaluated by the procurement office.

She emphasized,

All parties are given the opportunity to comment.

On 14 January 2021, German media reported that the law firm Kohler Schmid Möbus from Stuttgart investigated the case and sent three confidential reports to the Ministry of Defense just before 25 December 2020. Possible infringements of patent law in relation to the so-called "over-the-beach" (OTB) patent and the magazines offered by C.G. Haenel were investigated.

According to information from Business Insider, the Stuttgart patent attorneys, in two reports, concluded that these patents had been infringed, but the infringements were not significant. In the third report, the patent attorneys investigated whether a lawsuit initiated by C.G. Haenel seeking the nullity of Heckler & Koch's "over-the-beach" patent could succeed, and concluded that it could.

If these reports are correct, the ministry faces delivery cost and/or time problems, as legal deadlines will expire before April 2021 if both companies are unwilling to resolve their legal disputes.

On 31 January 2021, German media reported that C.G. Haenel was willing to take legal action, if necessary, to finally obtain the order that had been initially awarded and then withdrawn. Haenel managing director Olaf Sauer announced in the Frankfurter Allgemeine Zeitung that he would sue if his company was not considered.

On 20 February 2021, Business Insider reported that the Bundeswehr planned to officially announce the revocation of the controversial contract in the near future and expected C.G. Haenel to take legal action upon its exclusion.

On 3 March 2021, Business Insider reported C.G. Haenel had rejected allegations of patent violation in a confidential official statement to the Bundestag Defence Committee on 18 January 2021, and that the box magazine was not part of the final offer anyway, and that they reserved the right to deliver another magazine or even to build one themselves. Bundeswehr lawyers regarded this course of events as an inadmissible renegotiation.

Should Oberland Arms and/or Haenel actually use patented parts without permission, this would not only be a matter between the supplier and the manufacturer. Rather, the procurement guidelines of the Bundeswehr expressly require the contracting parties to ensure that their products are free of third-party rights.

The procurement office does not necessarily have to wait for the outcome of a patent dispute, which usually lasts several years. It must assess the risk a dispute poses for the manufacturer's ability to deliver, especially if the patent judges come to a different assessment of the situation in the future.

According to public procurement lawyers, shortly after the official announcement on 2 March 2021 by the German Federal Ministry of Defence revoking the order, the final decision on the new assault rifle could be delayed until all legal actions are exhausted. This may delay any future contract award for years until the matter is settled and lead to compensation payments.

Within a week, German media began reporting on the legal actions initiated in response to the award's revocation. After the second step of the legal actions path C.G. Haenel financial director Swen Lahl announced in the Südthüringer Zeitung on 13 March 2021 that Haenel would be willing to go through all authorities and courts.

On 24 April 2021, media reports of possible patent infringement by a Heckler & Koch box magazine at the expense of Magpul Industries emerged. Magpul Industries sent letters to Heckler & Koch, which were also forwarded to the Bundeswehr. The American company was convinced that the HK Gen3 polymer magazine infringed Magpul's patents and asked Heckler & Koch whether the magazine in question was part of the Heckler & Koch offer to the Bundeswehr. It is unclear how the German Ministry of Defence would like to proceed.

On 10 June 2021, German media reported the Federal Public Procurement Chamber had rejected the review request by C.G. Haenel. The public procurement tribunal, which is located at the Federal Cartel Office in Bonn, expressly stated that "the Federal Ministry of Defense rightly intends to award the contract to Heckler & Koch GmbH in this procurement procedure." C.G. Haenel can appeal against the Federal Public Procurement Chamber decision at the Düsseldorf Regional Court. The media considered that likely and estimated such a legal action could take three to five months.

On 3 July 2021, German media reported that the Federal Armed Forces Procurement Office had made serious mistakes when awarding the contract. The Federal Cartel Office criticized the arms manufacturer C.G. Haenel for improperly improving its offer.

According to the dpa news agency, citing a decision by the judges of the public procurement tribunal at the Federal Cartel Office, the procurement authority had contacted the bidders after their last possible final offers. Heckler & Koch stuck to its final offer, knowing that any changes would no longer be valid anyway. C.G. Haenel changed its offer and price. The "concretization" of the price meant that Haenel "made a more economical offer", according to the decision. "Here the measure led inadmissibly to a change in the ranking order." This was "inadmissible".

On 21 and 22 July 2021, German media reported that C.G. Haenel lodged a complaint with the Düsseldorf Regional Court following the Federal Cartel Office's negative decision against the company. According to a court spokeswoman, the hearing is scheduled for 2 March 2022. Haenel's financial director, Swen Lahl, does not expect a court decision until the second quarter of 2022. According to Lahl, until the federal government announces its final decision and the Bundestag approves the budget, it should be the end of 2022. Then 400 test weapons would be produced, which the Bundeswehr tests under different conditions. Only when this is completed does the next step follow:

Whoever wins the contract - series production should not start until 2024.

Haenel also rejects the patent infringement allegations by Heckler & Koch and Haenel's managing director Olaf Sauer stated:

We have a written agreement with the US company Magpul that we are allowed to use the magazine.

The dispute over the MK 556 over-the-beach capability is the subject of two previously initiated proceedings; a patent suit initiated by Heckler & Koch before the Düsseldorf Regional Court expected to start in October 2021 and a filed patent nullity suit initiated by Haenel at the Federal Patent Court in Munich.

According to German media, it is unclear when the Federal Patent Court in Munich will decide on this. It could be during 2022 or as late as 2023.

On 16 November 2021, the Düsseldorf Lower Regional Court ruled that C.G. Haenel infringed a Heckler & Koch patent; on 20 November 2021, German media reported that the complaint procedure at the Düsseldorf Regional Court, following a negative decision by the Federal Cartel Office, will likely begin in the spring of 2022.

The complaint procedure began in March 2022, and Heckler & Koch was summoned as an interested party. German media expect a decision on 6 April 2022.

The Regional Court was the final instance in the complaints procedure, making it clear that the award decision remains in place.

In June 2022, the Düsseldorf Regional Court rejected Haenel's lawsuit challenging its exclusion from the bidding process, implying that the award decision remains in place.

On 30 September 2022, partial success for C.G. Haenel in the "over-the-beach" (OTB) patent dispute with Heckler & Koch was reported by German media. The Federal Patent Court in Munich partially invalidated Heckler & Koch's patent in Germany.

Other courts will likely have to decide whether this partial nullity judgment is sufficient for C.G. Haenel to obtain compensation.

== Political reactions ==
Bundestag (German federal parliament) representatives of the Grüne and FDP political parties protested against awarding the Suhl, Thuringia-based bidder C.G. Haenel, because it is a subsidiary of other companies that are financially owned by the United Arab Emirates.

Landtag of Thuringia FDP representative Robert-Martin Montag deems the expressed award criticism regarding C.G. Haenel as absurd, claiming that:

if you follow the arguments of the Grüne and FDP Bundestag representatives, you shouldn't import oil from Saudi Arabia or buy Mercedes-Benz cars because Kuwait has a stake in Daimler. Both countries are also involved in the Yemeni Civil War.

Bundestag representatives of the CDU and CSU political parties, that together with the SPD support the German government, do not share the views of the Grüne and FDP regarding awarding C.G. Haenel.

According to the Frankfurter Allgemeine Zeitung, they expressed views quite similar to those of Robert-Martin Montag. According to Deputy Chairman of the Defence Committee of the German federal parliament Karl A. Lamers (CDU), it was "more often the case that investors from all over the world are involved in such companies". He specified how it was imperative "that our soldiers get a good rifle and that the price is good".

The Ministry of Defence stated that the ownership structure of the bidding companies should not play a legal role in the proceedings. Its procurement office is bound by tender legislation and may consider only quality and price.

Business Insider reported on 19 October 2020, the German Federal Defence Minister recently felt compelled to pause the process and informed her Secretary of State for Equipment, Cyber/Information Technology and Planning that any further steps and any communication regarding the planned acquisition of new assault rifles is subject to "leadership restriction". This means the minister wants to decide how the politically sensitive armament project will proceed personally.

A public document that the Ministry of Defence forwarded to the Bundestag Defence Committee on 26 October 2020 stated, that the ministry would partially restart the procurement process for the new standard assault rifle. No new technical investigations of the assault rifles offered by Heckler & Koch and C.G. Haenel are planned. Planned is a legal and economic assessment of the offers and how an initiated patent lawsuit between Heckler & Koch and C.G. Haenel at the Düsseldorf Regional Court might affect the offers.

For this, the ministry will engage an external, independent patent attorney as an expert to assess the consequences for the award procedure. To avoid problems of this kind in the future, new examination mechanisms are to be introduced within the procurement office. The Ministry of Defence offered the Bundestag Defence Committee the opportunity to discuss the submitted document in detail.

According to Business Insider on 28 October 2020, a final test report of the weapons tests states all weapons met the Bundeswehr technical requirements. Still, the HK416 was more accurate and less prone to failure than the MK 556 during the technical investigations. "Overall, it can be stated, that the weapons from Haenel still have potential for improving individual components", according to the confidential internal report. Without full access to the report, no well-founded technical conclusions can be drawn about the tested weapons.

The Bundestag Defence Committee discussed developments regarding a decision on a new G36 replacement in a meeting on 30 October 2020. The Tagesschau reported a serious allegation might have been discussed in the confidential meeting. After the submission of the final offers, the procurement office is said to have renegotiated with C.G. Haenel, which would be illegal. The procurement office may ask questions only if there are ambiguities in the best and final offers received. Queries that would change such offers are not allowed.

The Tagesschau later, on 30 October 2020, reported on German national television that the German Federal Defence Minister, after the meeting, personally, accompanied by senior civil servants, declined to comment on the new assault rifle topic and that an independent advisory commission should accompany further proceedings.

On the same day after the meeting, Der Spiegel and the Frankfurter Allgemeine Zeitung asserted that the Bundeswehr has to wait years for a new assault rifle and that almost all Bundestag Defence Committee members fear that one of the two bidders will be expelled from the proceedings by a court because of the various allegations. In this case, neither the ministry nor the Bundestag could have influence on the selection of a new assault rifle for the Bundeswehr.

In November 2020, C.G. Haenel started lobbying with Bundestag members to secure the contract. The Südthüringer Zeitung reported that the Ministry of Defence, according to an internal crisis scenario, did not expect delivery of the first batch of new assault rifles until 2024 and expected the minister would personally decide in the coming months how to proceed further.

According to German media on 1 March 2021, the Ministry of Defence informed the Bundestag Defence Committee that it had decided not to award the new assault rifle order to C.G. Haenel. Indications of patent infringement in an expert report justified the exclusion of the company, impacting partners Heckler & Koch and Magpul Industries. Regarding the prospective award revocation, it was expected that C.G. Haenel would file a complaint with the procurement office and later pursue legal action, which could result in compensation payments.

== Aftermath ==
In March 2021, the German Federal Ministry of Defence announced the adoption of the G95A1 to supersede the Heckler & Koch G36 as the standard issue rifle of the German Armed Forces, accompanied by the Specter DR 1-4× as the standard aiming optical sight.

The G95A1 is similar to the G95 but features a height-adjustable shoulder support on the stock, a steeper grip angle, and a shorter handguard to comply with the tender's required maximum weight of 3.5 kg (7.72 lb).

During field trials, the rifle was known as the HK416 A8. According to the Federal Procurement Office (German: BAAINBw, lit. 'Federal Office for Equipment, Information Technology and In-Service Support of the Bundeswehr'), when the Bundeswehr officially adopted the rifle, it was designated as the G95A1.

The Kurz or short-barrelled version for "specialized forces" will be designated as G95KA1.
