= Gewehr 95 (disambiguation) =

Gewehr 95 may refer to:

- Heckler & Koch G95 (German: Gewehr 95), a variant of the German Heckler & Koch HK416 assault rifle
- Mannlicher M1895 (German: Infanterie Repetier-Gewehr M.95, Hungarian: Gyalogsági Ismétlő Puska M95; "Infantry Repeating-Rifle M95"), an Austro-Hungarian bolt-action rifle
