= Heckler & Koch HK416 =

German assault rifle

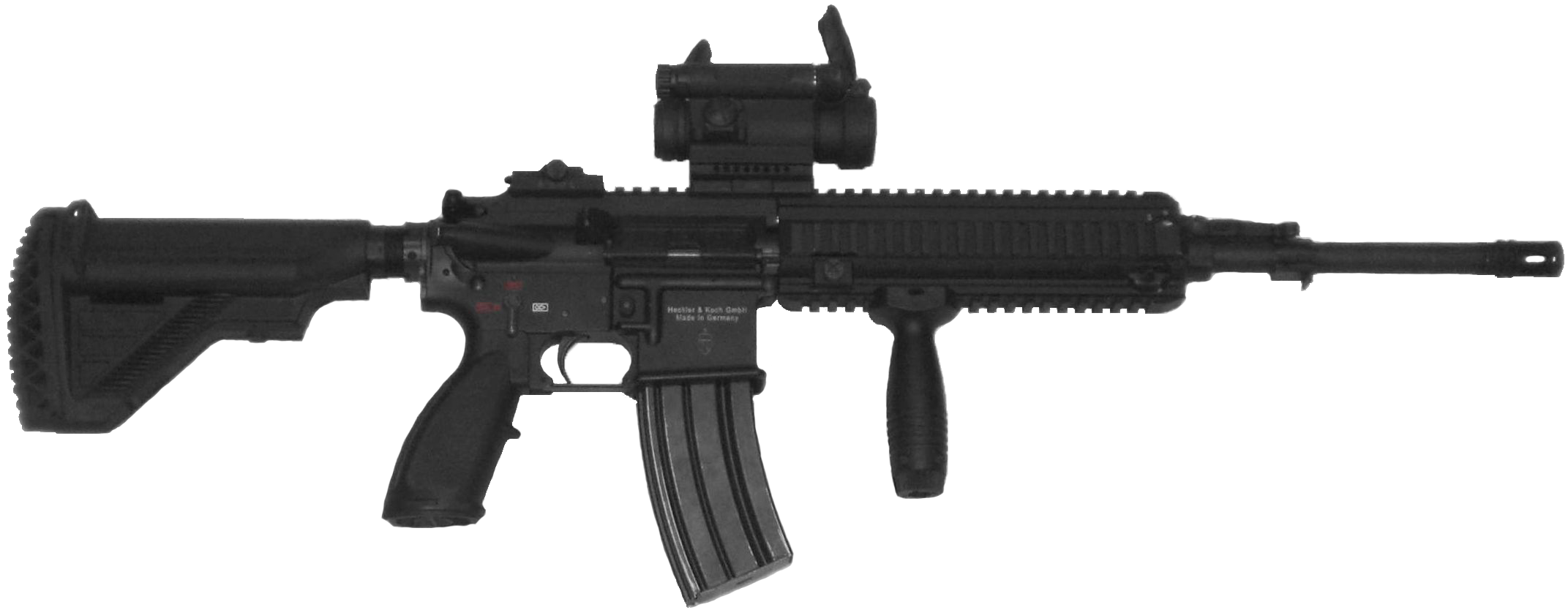
- HK416N with an Aimpoint CompM4 red dot sight and a vertical foregrip
- Type: Assault rifle; Carbine
- Place of origin: Germany

Service history
- In service: 2004–present
- Used by: See Users
- Wars: War in Afghanistan (2001–2021); Iraq War; Mali War; War in Iraq (2013–2017); Operation Inherent Resolve; German intervention against ISIL; Opération Chammal; Kurdistan Workers' Party insurgency; Militias-Comando Vermelho conflict; Russian invasion of Ukraine; War on cartels; Ecuadorian conflict (2024–present)

Production history
- Manufacturer: Heckler & Koch
- Produced: 2004–present
- Variants: See Variants

Specifications
- Mass: 3.120–3.850 kg (6.88–8.49 lb) (A5 without magazine); 3.740–4.470 kg (8.25–9.85 lb) (A5 with full 30-round magazine)
- Length: 709–1,030 mm (27.9–40.6 in) (A5, retractable stock)
- Barrel length: 11–20 in (280–510 mm) HK416C: 9 in (230 mm)
- Width: 74–78 mm (2.9–3.1 in)
- Height: 236–240 mm (9.3–9.4 in)
- Cartridge: 5.56×45mm NATO
- Action: Gas-operated short-stroke piston, rotating bolt
- Rate of fire: 850 rounds/min
- Muzzle velocity: 790 to 917 m/s (2,590 to 3,010 ft/s)
- Effective firing range: 300 to 800 m (330 to 870 yd)
- Feed system: STANAG magazine
- Sights: Picatinny rail–mounted front and rear iron sights, optional removable gas block-mounted flip-up front sight post

The Heckler & Koch HK416 is an assault rifle chambered for the 5.56×45mm NATO cartridge, designed and manufactured by the German company Heckler & Koch. Although the design is based on the selective fire AR-15/M16 class of firearm (specifically the Colt M4 carbine family issued to the U.S. military), it uses a proprietary short-stroke gas piston system from the Heckler & Koch G36 family of rifles.

The HK416 has been adopted by various military forces and is used by many special operations units worldwide. The Norwegian Armed Forces had adopted the HK416N as their standard issue rifle in 2008. The United States Marine Corps has adopted a modified variant, designated as the M27 Infantry Automatic Rifle to replace the M249 SAW, and eventually also the M16A4, M4 and M4A1. The HK416F has been selected by the French Armed Forces to replace the FAMAS in 2017. The HK416 A5 is in service with the Irish Army Ranger Wing. The German Army had adopted a variant of the HK416, designated as the G95A1 to replace the G36 as their standard issue service rifle.

== History ==
The United States Army's Delta Force, at the request of R&D NCO Larry Vickers, collaborated with Heckler & Koch to develop a new carbine in the 1990s for use in close quarters combat. At this point, they were equipped with the Heckler & Koch MP5, whose 9 mm bullet was considered too weak, and the M4 carbine, which was considered too large, especially when fitted with a suppressor. During development, Heckler & Koch capitalized on experience gained developing the Bundeswehr's Heckler & Koch G36 assault rifle, the U.S. Army's XM8 project (cancelled in 2005) and the British Armed Forces SA80 A2 upgrade programme. The project was originally called the Heckler & Koch M4, but this was changed in response to a trademark infringement suit filed by Colt Defense. The final designation, HK416 is derived from the M4 and M16.

The HK416 has been tested by the United States military and is in use with some law enforcement agencies. Delta Force replaced its M4s with the HK416Ds in March 2005, after tests revealed that the piston operating system significantly reduces malfunctions while increasing the life of parts. The HK416D was used by the US Navy's SEAL Team Six to kill Osama bin Laden in 2011.

A modified variant underwent testing by the United States Marine Corps as the M27 Infantry Automatic Rifle (IAR). After the Marine Corps Operational Test & Evaluation Activity supervised a round of testing at MCAGCC Twentynine Palms, Fort McCoy, and Camp Shelby (for dust, cold-weather, and hot-weather conditions, respectively). As of March 2012, fielding of 452 IARs had been completed of 4,748 ordered. Five infantry battalions: 1st Light Armored Reconnaissance Battalion and 2nd Battalion, 4th Marines, out of Camp Pendleton; 1st Battalion, 3rd Marines, out of Marine Corps Base Hawaii; 1st Battalion, 9th Marines, out of Camp Lejeune; and 1st Battalion, 25th Marines, out of Fort Devens, have deployed the M27 IAR. In December 2017, the Marine Corps revealed a decision to equip every Marine in an infantry squad with the M27 IAR.

The HK416 was one of the rifles displayed to U.S. Army officials during an invitation-only Industry Day on 13 November 2008. The goal of the Industry Day was to review current carbine technology prior to writing formal requirements for a future replacement for the M4 carbine. The HK416 A5 was then an entry in the Individual Carbine competition to replace the M4 carbine. The Individual Carbine competition was cancelled before a winning carbine was chosen.

=== Military adoption ===
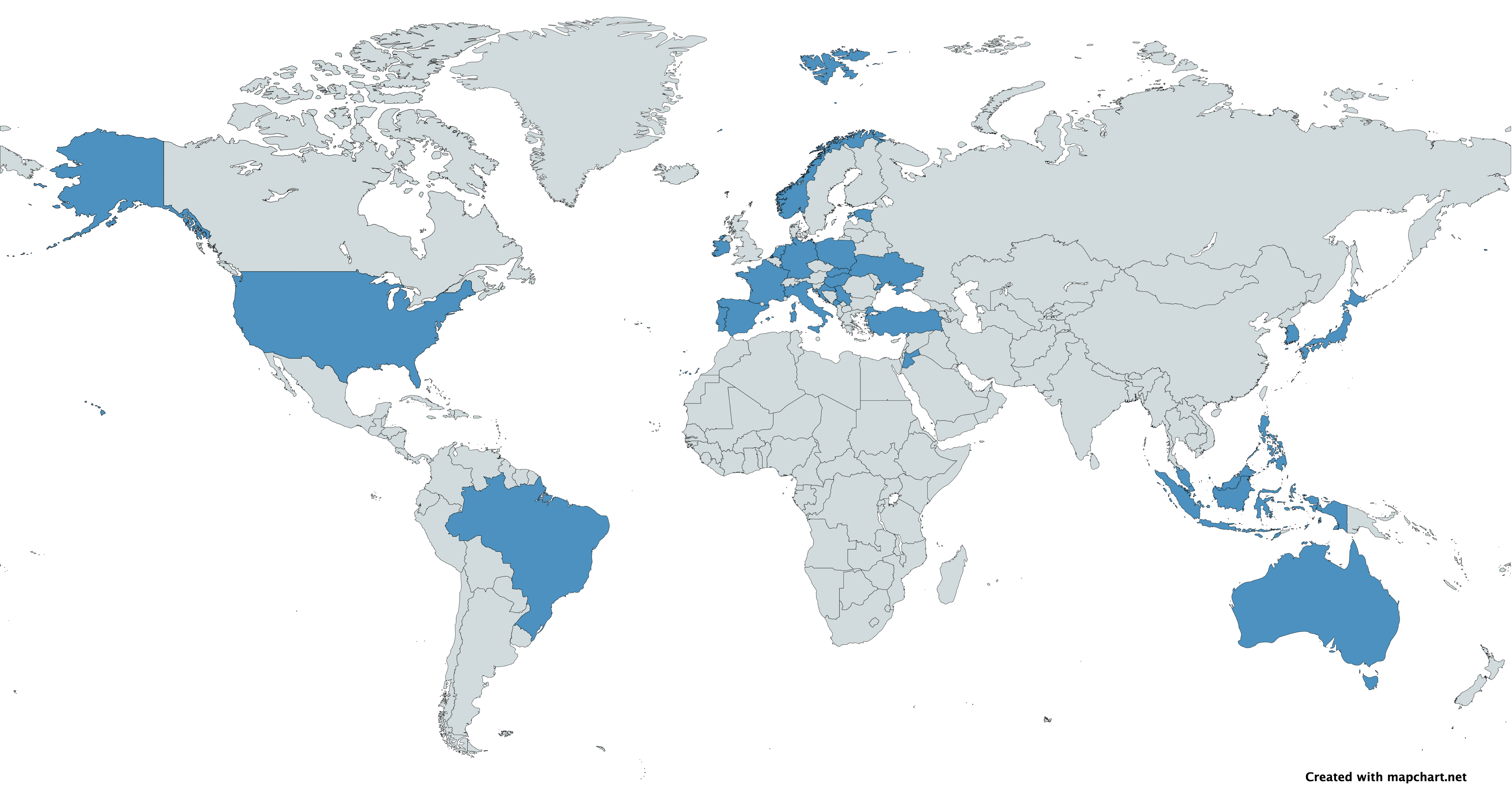
Map with users of the Heckler & Koch HK416 in blue

In July 2007, the U.S. Army announced a limited competition between the M4 carbine, FN SCAR-L, Heckler & Koch HK416, and the previously shelved Heckler & Koch XM8. Ten examples of each of the four competitors were involved. Each rifle fired 60,000 rounds in an extreme dust environment. The shoot-off was for assessing future needs, not to select a replacement for the M4. The XM8 scored the best, with only 127 stoppages in 60,000 total rounds, the FN SCAR Light had 226 stoppages, while the HK416 had 233 stoppages. The M4 carbine scored "significantly worse" than the rest of the field with 882 stoppages. However, magazine failures caused 239 of the M4's 882 failures. Army officials said, in December 2007, that the new magazines could be combat-ready by spring of 2008 if testing went well.

In December 2009, a modified version of the HK416 was selected for the final testing in the Infantry Automatic Rifle program, designed to partially replace the M249 light machine gun at the squad level for the United States Marine Corps. It beat the three other finalists by FN Herstal and Colt Defense. In July 2010, the HK416 IAR was designated as the M27 IAR and 450 were procured for additional testing.

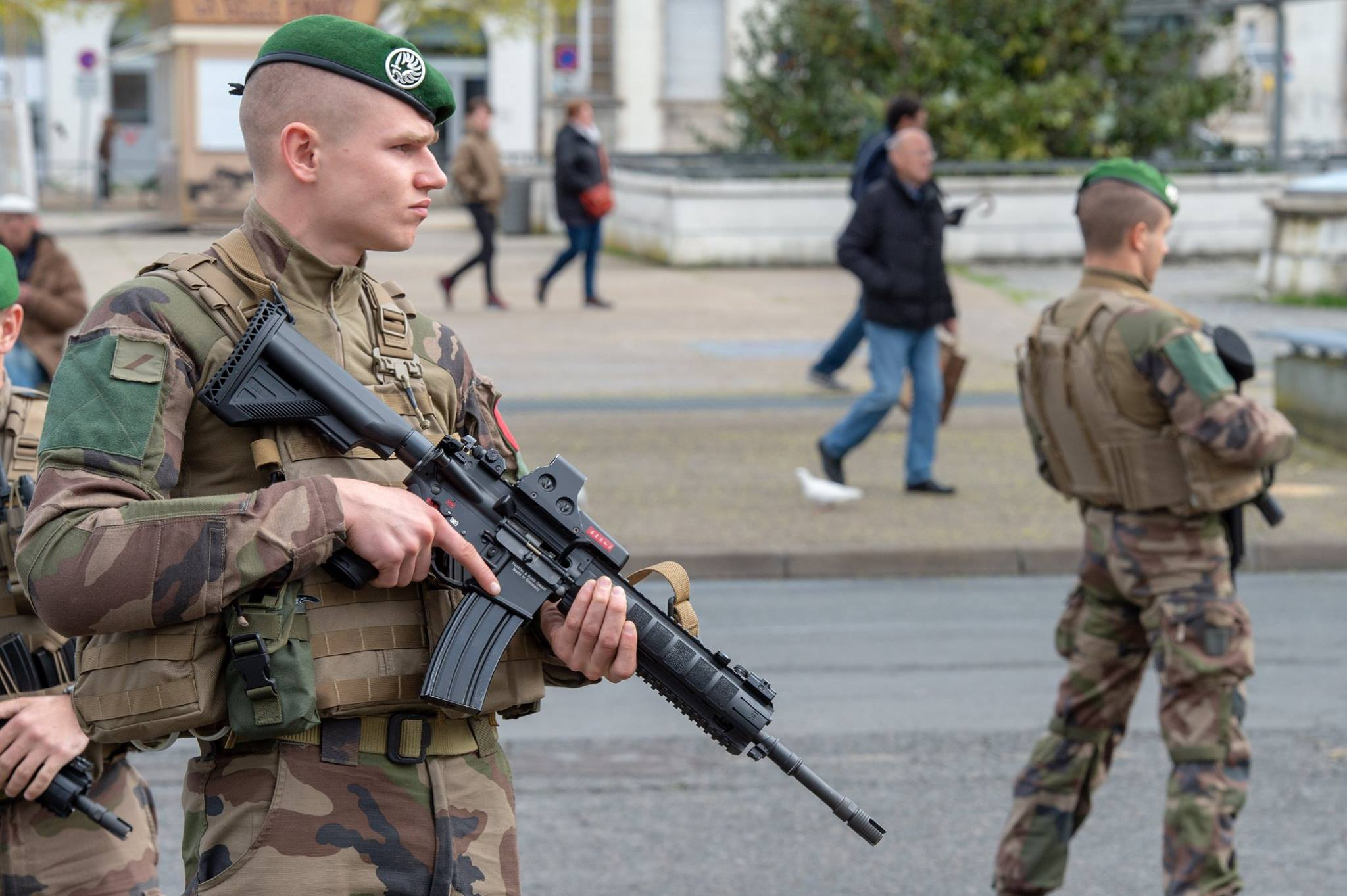
French Armed Forces 2^{e} REP legionnaires with the HK416F with EOTech holographic sight (Opération Sentinelle. France, 2018)

The French Armed Forces conducted a rifle evaluation and trial to replace the FAMAS, and selected the HK416F as its primary firearm in 2016. Of the 93,080 rifles, 54,575 will be a "short" version with a 280 mm (11 in) barrel weighing 3.7 kg (8.2 lb) without the ability to use a grenade launcher, and 38,505 will be a "standard" version with a 368 mm (14.5 in) barrel weighing 4 kg (8.8 lb), of which 14,915 will take FÉLIN attachments; standard rifles will be supplied with 10,767 HK269F grenade launchers. 5,000 units are supposed to be delivered in 2017, half of the order delivered by 2022, and the order fulfilled by 2028. The first batch of 400 rifles was delivered on 3 May 2017. In November 2026, the DGA ordered 72.000 additional rilles, for a total of 189.000.

In 2017, the Bundeswehr began the System Sturmgewehr Bundeswehr (Bundeswehr Assault Rifle System) effort to replace the G36, spurred in part by accuracy issues from thermal expansion of the barrel. Weapons put forth were the Heckler & Koch HK416, HK433, and Haenel MK 556. Initially, C.G. Haenel won the competition in September 2020 with their MK 556. However, German authorities cancelled the contract the next month, amid allegations that the MK 556 infringed on Heckler & Koch patents, and the HK416A8 was selected in early 2021. Haenel sued to attempt to reverse the decision, but a German court dismissed the lawsuit in June 2022. The 419 mm (16.5 in) barrel G95A1 and the shorter 355 mm (14.0 in) barrel G95KA1, based on the HK416A8, were adopted by the Bundeswehr in 2025 as the standard issue service rifles for the German Army (Heer), replacing the G36.

=== Influence on other manufacturers' designs ===
The Turkish company Makina ve Kimya Endustrisi Kurumu ("Mechanical and Chemical Industry Corporation") had considered manufacturing a copy of the HK416 as the MKEK Mehmetçik-1 for the Turkish Armed Forces. Instead, the new MPT-76 rifle has been developed by KALEKALIP with MKEK as the producer, with the Mehmetçik-1 dropped from adoption into the Turkish military.

The SIG Sauer SIG516 and CAR 816 series share lineage with the HK416, whilst omitting many proprietary components that were exchanged for standard M4 carbine family elements. The principal firearms engineers for the SIG516 and CAR 816 were Robert Hirt and Chris Sirois. During his time with Heckler & Koch, Hirt was involved in the development of the HK416.

== Design details ==
Short-stroke gas piston

The HK416 uses a proprietary short-stroke gas piston system that derives from the Heckler & Koch G36. The HK system uses a short-stroke piston driving an operating rod to force the bolt carrier to the rear. This design prevents combustion gases from entering the HK416's interior—a shortcoming with direct impingement systems. The reduction in heat and fouling of the bolt carrier group increases the reliability of the HK416 and extends the interval between stoppages. During factory tests the HK416 fired 10,000 rounds in full-auto without malfunctioning. The HK416's piston system was originally self-regulating in theory, but in the default position tends to give increased recoil over an adjustable gas system. A user adjustable gas regulator was added in later variants.

The HK416 is equipped with a proprietary accessory rail forearm with MIL-STD-1913 rails on all four sides. This allows the HK416 to fit most modern accessories. The HK416 rail forearm can be installed and removed without tools by using the bolt locking lug as the screwdriver. The rail forearm is "free-floating" and does not contact the barrel, improving accuracy.

The HK416 has an adjustable multi-position telescopic butt stock, offering six different lengths of pull. The shoulder pad can be either convex or concave and the stock features a storage space for maintenance accessories, spare electrical batteries or other small kit items. It can also be switched out for other variations like Magpul stocks.

The trigger pull is 34 N (7.6 lb_{f}). The empty weight of a HK416 box magazine is 250 g (8.8 oz).

The HK416's barrel is cold hammer-forged with a 20,000-round service life and features a 6-groove 178 mm (7.0 in) right hand twist. The cold hammer-forging process provides a stronger barrel for greater safety in case of an obstructed bore or for extended firing sessions. Modifications for an over-the-beach (OTB) capability such as drainage holes in the bolt carrier and buffer system are available to let the HK416 fire safely as quickly as possible after being submerged in liquids like water. To reduce the risk of slam-firing, the HK416 features a proprietary firing pin safety in the bolt. This firing pin safety limits the HK416 upper to working with standard AR-15 type full height hammers in the fire control group of the lower.

== Variants ==
=== HK416 ===
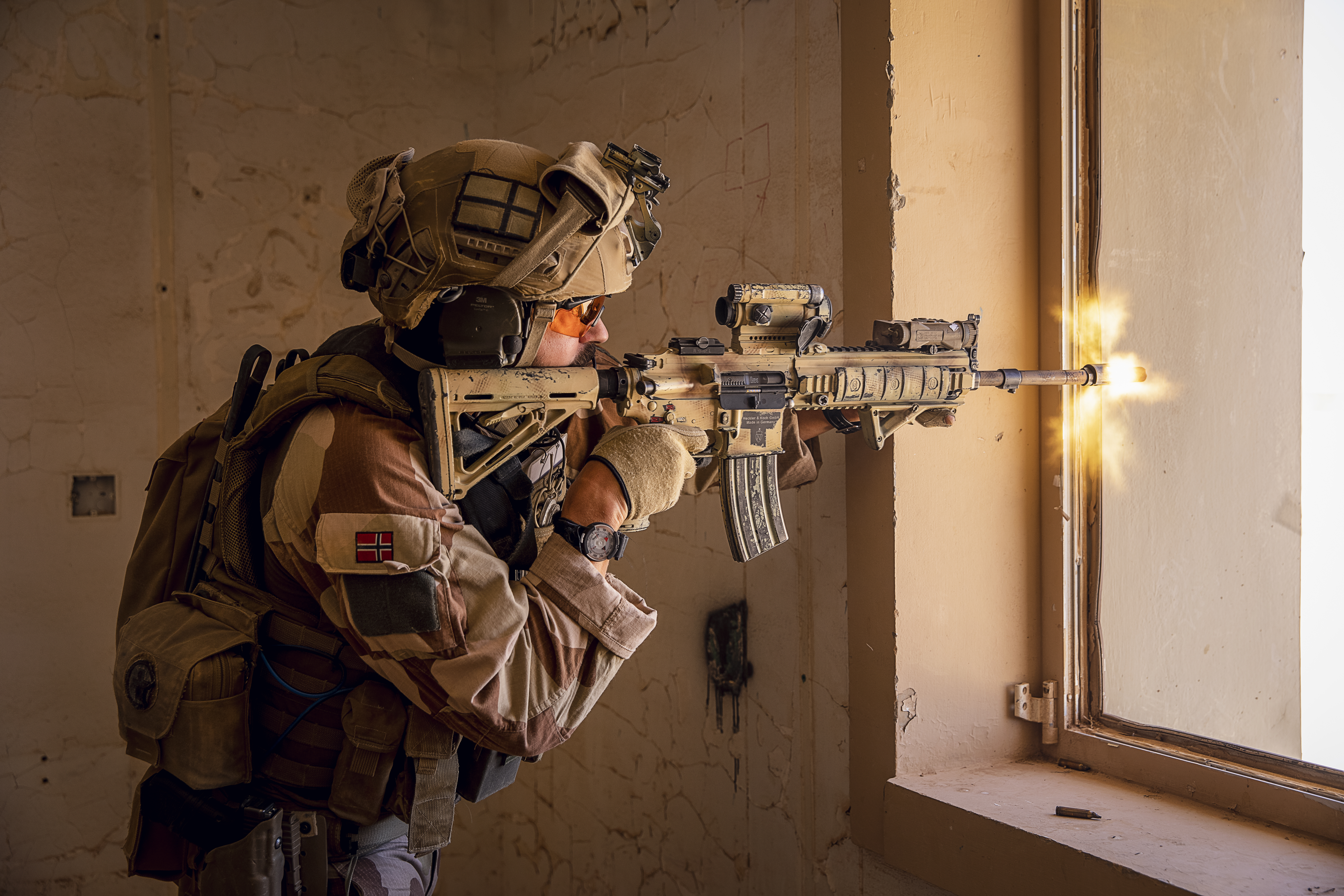
A Norwegian soldier fires the HK416N towards a simulated target at Al Asad Air Base, Iraq, June 13, 2020.

The HK416 chambered for 5.56×45mm NATO is offered in multiple barrel lengths available to the military and law enforcement market only.

- D10RS: sub-compact with a 264 mm (10.4 in) barrel
- D14.5RS (D145RS): carbine 368 mm (14.5 in) barrel
- D16.5RS (D165RS): rifle with 419 mm (16.5 in) barrel
- D20RS: full-sized rifle 508 mm (20 in) barrel

==== HK416C ====
The HK416C "C" for Compact is an ultra-compact variant that only remained as a prototype and never went into full production. It has a 228 mm (9.0 in) barrel and is expected to produce muzzle velocities of approximately 730 m/s (2,395 ft/s). It was submitted for the Ultra Compact Individual Weapon contract but lost to the LWRC M6A2.

==== M27 IAR ====
The M27 Infantry Automatic Rifle is a squad automatic weapon variant developed from the D16.5RS, adopted in 2011 by the United States Marine Corps. In 2018 the USMC decided to adopt the M27 IAR as their infantry standard service rifle.

=== HK416A5 ===
The HK416A5 is an improved variant with ambidextrous controls that was first seen in the Individual Carbine competition. It features a stock similar to that of the G28 designated marksman rifle, except slimmer and non-adjustable. The rifle features an improved tool-less adjustable gas regulator for suppressor use, which can accommodate barrel lengths down to 267 mm (10.5 in) without modifications. It also features a redesigned lower receiver with ambidextrous fire controls, optimised magazine and ammunition compatibility, a repair kit housed inside the pistol grip, and a Flat Dark Earth colour scheme. The stock has a fixed buttplate and no longer has a storage space, as well as the sling loops removed from it. The V2 HK Battle grip is incorporated, which has the V2 grip profile with the storage compartment of the V1 grip for tools. The handguard uses a new hexagonal-shaped cross bolt that cannot be removed by the bolt locking lugs but instead by the takedown tool housed inside the grip. It has a "heavy duty castle nut", which is more robust than the previous version, therefore making that weak spot more resistant to impact.

As of 2013, Heckler & Koch replaced the original HK416 with the A5 variant.

- HK416 A5 – 11": sub-compact with a 279 mm (11.0 in) barrel
- HK416 A5 – 14.5": carbine 368 mm (14.5 in) barrel
- HK416 A5 – 16.5": rifle with 419 mm (16.5 in) barrel
- HK416 A5 – 20": full-sized rifle 508 mm (20 in) barrel

==== G38 ====
In 2014, The HK416A5 has been type classified by the German federal government as the G38, according to Strategie-Technik. Heckler & Koch offers the G38 in two barrel lengths, an 11- and 14.5-inch barrel.

=== G95 ===
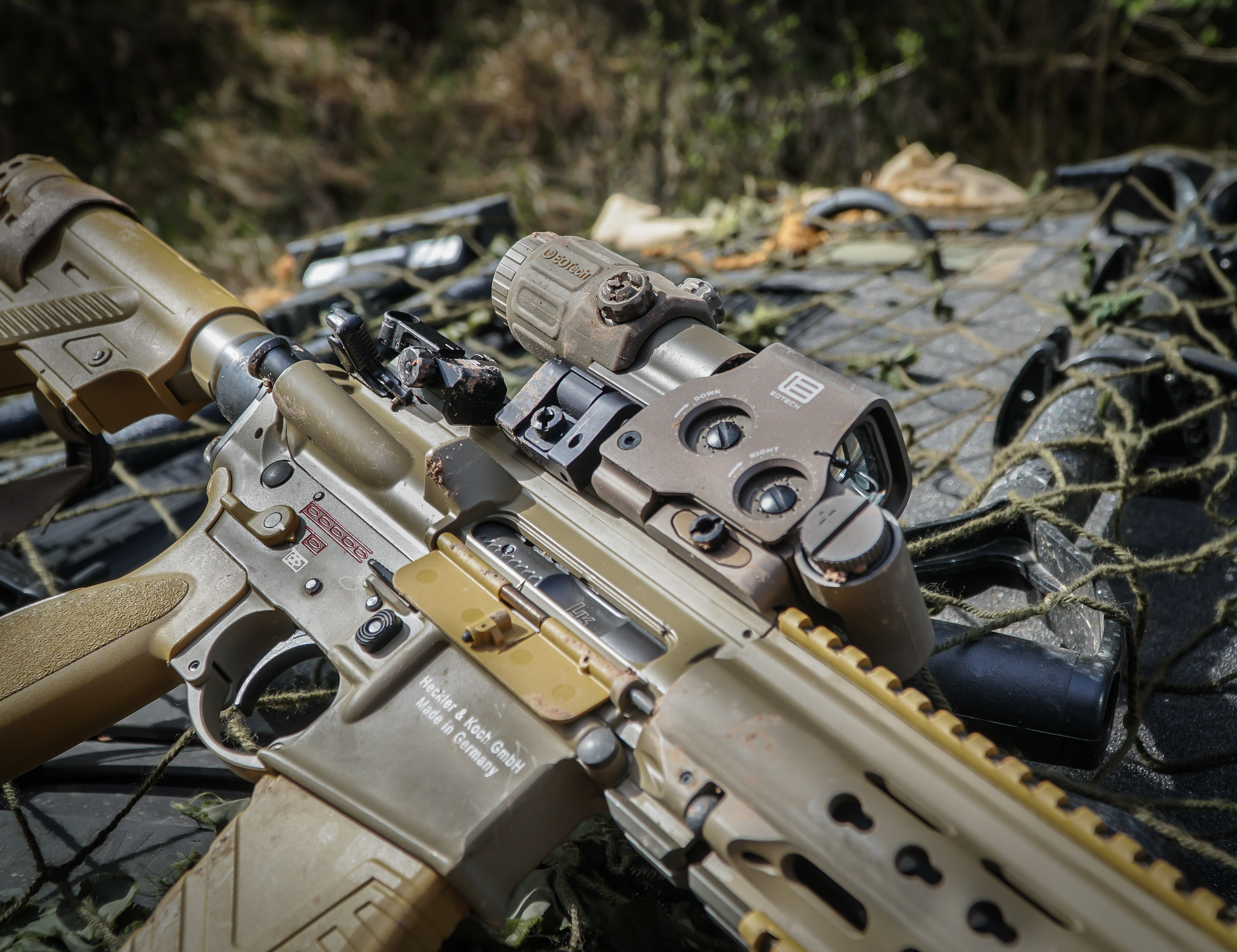
A close-up image of a G95's fire selector with tan color EOTech EXPS3-0 holographic weapon sight and G33 magnifier on the receiver rail

The G95 is designed for the German KSK and KSM special forces units. During field testing of the rifle it was known as the HK416 A7. This variant weighs 3.67 kg (8.1 lb) and has a 368 mm (14.5 in) barrel. It is similar to the HK416A5 variant but with a 45-degree safety selector, that rotates 45 degrees rather than 90 degrees as on the A5 variant safety selector. The new configuration of the selector is comparable to those of aftermarket 45-degree safety selectors. The G95 also features a HKey rail system, which is more lightweight than the traditional Picatinny rail systems. The HKey rail system is also compatible with the HK416A5 variant.

==== G95A1/G95KA1 ====
In March 2021, the German Federal Ministry of Defence announced the adoption of the G95A1 to supersede the Heckler & Koch G36 as the standard issue rifle of the German Armed Forces, accompanied by the Specter DR 1-4× as the standard aiming optical sight. The G95A1 is similar to the G95, but features a height-adjustable shoulder support on the stock, a steeper grip angle as well as a shorter hand guard and thinner barrel profile to comply with the required ≤ 3.5 kg (7.72 lb) weight limit according to the tender. During field trials, the rifle was known as the HK416 A8. According to the Federal Procurement Office (BAAINBw – Federal Office for Equipment, Information Technology and In-Service Support of the Bundeswehr), when the Bundeswehr officially adopted the rifle, it was designated as the G95A1. The Kurz or short barrelled version for "specialized forces" will be designated as G95KA1. After evaluations and trials, the G95A1 and G95KA1 reverted to the original more vertical grip angle as well as a slimmer buttstock and longer handguard with a cutout for accessing the gas regulator; the handguard's "HKey" interface was also replaced with M-LOK for direct accessory attachment onto the "negative space" (hollow slot) mounting points.

Specification		G95KA1	G95A1
Length	Maximum (weapon)	878 mm (34.6 in)	942 mm (37.1 in)
Length	Minimum (weapon)	796 mm (31.3 in)	860 mm (34 in)
Length	Barrel length	355 mm (14.0 in)	419 mm (16.5 in)
Weight	Without attachments	3.3 kg (7.3 lb)	3.4 kg (7.5 lb)
	With optics, laser light module and full magazine	4.3 kg (9.5 lb)	4.4 kg (9.7 lb)
Effective combat range		450 m (492 yd)	—

=== HK417 ===
The HK417 is a battle rifle variant of the HK416 chambered in 7.62×51mm NATO cartridge.

=== Civilian variants ===
Civilian variants of the HK416 and HK417 introduced in 2007 were known as MR223 and MR308 (as they remain known in Europe). Both are semi-automatic rifles with several sporterized features. At the 2009 SHOT Show, these two firearms were introduced to the U.S. civilian market renamed respectively MR556 and MR762. There is another variant of the MR556 called the MR556A1, which is an improved version of the former. It was created with input from American special forces units. The MR556A1 lets the upper receiver attach to any M16/M4/AR-15 family lower receiver, as the receiver take-down pins are in the same standard location. The original concept for the MR556 did not allow for this, as the take-down pins were located in a "non-standard" location. The MR223 maintains the "non-standard" location of the pins, disallowing attachment of the upper receiver to the lower receivers with a high shelf. It will attach and function with AR15 lower receivers with a low shelf.

As of 2012, the MR556A1 upper receiver group fits standard AR-15 lower receivers without modification, and functions reliably with standard STANAG magazines. HK-USA sells a variant under the MR556A1 Competition Model nomenclature; it comes with a 14.5" free-float Modular Rail System (MRS), 16.5" barrel, OSS compensator and Magpul CTR buttstock. The firearm's precision is specified as 1 MOA by Heckler & Koch. In Europe, the MR223A3 variant is sold with the same cosmetic and ergonomic improvements of the HK416A5. The French importer of Heckler & Koch in France, RUAG Defence, have announced that they are going to sell two civilian versions of the HK416F, named the MR223 F-S (14.5" Standard version) and MR223 F-C (11" Short version). In 2024, Heckler & Koch launched the MR556A4, which incorporates the updates found in the HK416A7/A8.

== Operators ==
=== Military operators ===
==== Standard issue operators ====
Country	Operator	Variant	Quantity	Entry in service	Notes
France	French Armed Forces	HK416F-S (standard) / HK416F-C (court)	174 337	2017	
Germany	German Army	G95A1 / G95KA1	250,000 (+250,000 planned)	2025	
Luxembourg	Luxembourg Armed Forces	HK416A7 D14.5RS	N/A	–	Can be equipped with a HK269 grenade launcher.
Luxembourg	Luxembourg Armed Forces	HK416A7 D11RS	N/A	–	Can be equipped with a HK269 grenade launcher.
Norway	Norwegian Armed Forces	HK416N ("Normal"); HK416N ("Kort", a short barrel variant); HK416S ("skarpskytter", a DMR variant of the HK416N)	≥ 40,000	2008	
Norway	Norwegian Home Guard	HK416N ("Normal"); HK416N ("Kort", a short barrel variant); HK416S ("skarpskytter", a DMR variant of the HK416N)	11,000	2008	
Spain	Spanish Marine Infantry	HK416A5	N/A	2018	
United States	US Marine Corps	M27 IAR	14,100	2011 - 2019	

==== Special forces operators ====
Country	Operator	Variant	Quantity	Entry in service	Notes
Albania	Albanian Armed Forces - Special Operations Battalion (Batalioni i Forcave Speciale, BFS)	HK416A5	N/A	–	
Australia	Australian Defence Force - special forces	D10RS	N/A	2010	
Brazil	Brazilian Army - Special Operations Command (Comando de Operações Especiais, C Op Esp)	HK416A3	N/A	–	
Brazil	Brazilian Marine Corps - Amphibious Commandos	N/A	N/A	–	
Brazil	Brazilian Navy - Combat Divers Groupment	HK416A3	N/A	–	
Croatia	Croatian Armed Forces - Special Operations Command	N/A	550	2012 - 2015	
Estonia	Estonian Defence Forces - Estonian Special Operations Force	N/A	N/A	2021	
Germany	German Army - German Special Forces Command (KSK)	G95	1,705	–	
Germany	German Navy - Kommando Spezialkräfte Marine	G95	N/A	–	
Indonesia	Indonesian Army - Kopassus (Special Forces Command)	N/A	N/A	–	
Indonesia	Indonesian Army - Tontaipur (Combat Reconnaissance Platoon)	N/A	N/A	–	
Indonesia	Indonesian Navy Denjaka (Naval Anti-Terrorism Unit)	N/A	N/A	–	
Indonesia	Indonesian Navy - Kopaska (Frogman Forces Command)	N/A	N/A	–	
Indonesia	Indonesian Navy - Taifib (Amphibious Reconnaissance Battalion)	HK416A5	N/A	–	
Ireland	Defence Forces - Army Ranger Wing (ARW)	HK416A5	N/A	2010	
Italy	Italian Army - 9th Parachute Assault Regiment (special forces)	N/A	N/A	–	
Italy	Italian Navy - Comando Raggruppamento Subacquei e Incursori Teseo Tesei (COMSUBIN)	N/A	N/A	–	
Japan	Japan Maritime Self-Defense Force - Special Boarding Unit (SBU - Tokubetsukeibitai)	N/A	N/A	–	
Japan	Japan Ground Self-Defense Force - Special Forces Group (SFG, Tokushusakusengun)	N/A	N/A	–	
Jordan	Royal Jordanian Army - Joint Special Operations Command	N/A	N/A	–	
Lithuania	Lithuanian Armed Forces - Lithuanian Special Operations Force	HK416A5	N/A	–	
Malaysia	Royal Malaysian Navy - PASKAL ("Pasukan Khas Laut"), special operations warfare unit	D16.5RS	180	2010	
Montenegro	Armed Forces of Montenegro - special forces units	HK416 D14.5RS / HK416 D16.5RS / HK416 D10RS	N/A	–	
Netherlands	Royal Netherlands Army - Korps Commandotroepen	HK416A5; D10RS; D14.5RS	N/A	2010	
Netherlands	Netherlands Marine Corps - M-Squadron (Maritime Special Operations Forces)	HK416A5; D10RS; D14.5RS	N/A	–	
Philippines	Philippine Army - Light Reaction Regiment	N/A	N/A	2012	
Poland	Wojska Specjalne (military special forces)	Multiple barrel lengths	N/A	–	
Portugal	Portuguese Army - CTOE (Special Operations Troops)	HK416A5	N/A	2013	
Portugal	Portuguese Marine Corps - Special Actions Detachment and Fuzileiros	N/A	N/A	2018 - 2024	
Portugal	Portuguese Air Force - JTAC	N/A	N/A	–	
Serbia	Serbian Armed Forces - 72nd Brigade for Special Operations	N/A	N/A	2010	
Singapore	Republic of Singapore Navy	N/A	N/A	–	
Singapore	Republic of Singapore Army - Special Operations Force	N/A	N/A	–	
Slovakia	Slovak Armed Forces - 5th Special Forces Regiment	N/A	N/A	2010	
South Korea	Republic of Korea Navy - Special Warfare Flotilla	N/A	364	2017	
Turkey	Turkish Armed Forces - Special Forces	HK416A5	N/A	–	
Ukraine	Armed Forces of Ukraine	HK416A2 / others	N/A	–	The HK416 A2 are mostly supplied by the Netherlands.
United States	US Army - Asymmetric Warfare Group	N/A	N/A	–	
United States	Joint Special Operations Command (Delta Force, SEAL Team Six, 24th STS)	N/A	N/A	2005	

=== Police and civilian operators ===
Country	Operator	Variant	Quantity	Entry in service	Notes
Australia	Australian Federal Police	N/A	N/A	–	
Australia	Queensland Police Service	N/A	N/A	–	
Brazil	Brazilian Federal Police - Command of Tactical Operations (Comando de Operações Táticas, COT)	HK416A3	N/A	2012	
Brazil	Brazilian Federal Police - Tactical Intervention Groups (Grupos de Intervenção Tática, GPI)	HK416A5	N/A	2014	
Germany	Hessen State Police	G38 (semi-auto, 14.5 '' barrel)	2,005	–	
Hungary	Hungarian Ministry of Interior - Counter Terrorism Center	HK416A5	N/A	–	
Indonesia	Indonesian National Police - Detachment 88 (counter-terrorism unit)	N/A	N/A	–	
Indonesia	Indonesian Maritime Security Agency (Bakamla)	N/A	N/A	–	
Ireland	Garda Síochána - Emergency Response Unit (ERU)	HK416A5	N/A	2010	
Italy	Carabinieri - Gruppo di Intervento Speciale (GIS)	N/A	N/A	–	
Japan	National Police Agency - Special Assault Team (SAT - Tokushukyushubutai)	N/A	N/A	–	
Malaysia	Royal Malaysia Police - Pasukan Gerakan Khas, counter-terrorism divisions	D10RS / D14.5RS	N/A	2006	
Malaysia	Malaysian Maritime Enforcement Agency	HK416A5	N/A	–	
Netherlands	Dutch National Police - Dienst Speciale Interventies	N/A	N/A	–	
Netherlands	Royal Marechaussee - Brigade Speciale Beveiligingsopdrachten	N/A	N/A	–	
Philippines	Philippine National Police	N/A	N/A	2017	
Poland	Policja	HK416 D10RS	N/A	2006 - 2011	
Portugal	Portuguese National Republican Guard - GIOE (Special Operations Intervention Group)	N/A	N/A	2019	
Portugal	Portuguese Maritime Police - GAT (Tactical Actions Group)	N/A	N/A	2015	
South Korea	Korea National Police - SWAT	N/A	N/A	–	
United States	FBI Hostage Rescue Team	N/A	N/A	–	
United States	NASA Emergency Response Teams	N/A	N/A	–	
United States	Los Angeles Police Department Metropolitan Division	N/A	N/A	–	

== See also ==
- Beretta ARX160
- Haenel MK 556
- IWI Tavor
- M7 rifle
- Sako M23
- Steyr AUG
- List of assault rifles
- List of carbines

Preceded by FAMAS	French Army rifle 2017–present	Succeeded by current
