= Heckler & Koch G95 =

German assault rifle

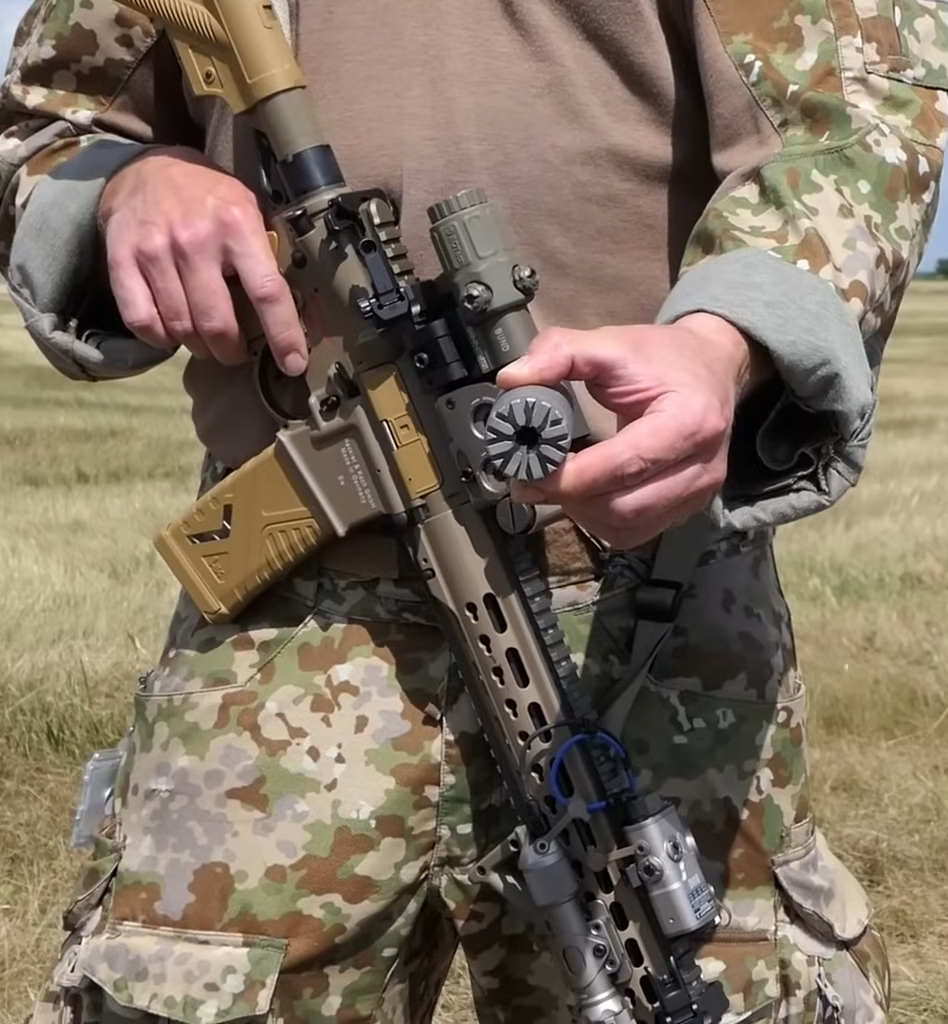
- G95K in service with German special operation forces
- Type: Assault rifle
- Place of origin: Germany

Service history
- In service: 2017–present (G95); 2025–present (G95A1 and G95KA1)
- Used by: See Users
- Wars: Russo-Ukrainian war

Production history
- Designer: Heckler & Koch
- Designed: 2017 (G95); 2021 (G95A1 and G95KA1)
- Manufacturer: Heckler & Koch
- Produced: 2017–present
- No. built: 12,000 already produced 250,000 (intended)
- Variants: G95K, G95A1, G95KA1

Specifications (G95KA1)
- Mass: 3.3–4.3 kg (7.3–9.5 lb) empty to loaded with optics and laser light module
- Length: 796–878 mm (31.3–34.6 in) with adjustable stock
- Barrel length: 355 mm (14.0 in) G95KA1, 419 mm (16.5 in) G95A1
- Width: 74 mm (2.9 in)
- Height: 240 mm (9.4 in)
- Cartridge: 5.56×45mm NATO
- Action: Gas-operated short-stroke piston, rotating bolt
- Rate of fire: Cyclic rate: 700–900 rounds/min
- Muzzle velocity: 882 m/s (2,890 ft/s)
- Effective firing range: 450 m (490 yd) (point target); 700 m (770 yd) (area target)
- Maximum firing range: 3,600 m (3,937 yd)
- Feed system: 30-round STANAG magazine
- Sights: ELCAN Specter DR 1-4, flip-up rear rotary diopter sight and front post

The Heckler & Koch G95 (German: Gewehr 95) is an assault rifle chambered for the 5.56×45mm NATO cartridge, designed and manufactured by the German company Heckler & Koch. It is a variant of the company's HK416 assault rifle, which is based on the selective fire AR-15/M16 class of firearm (specifically the Colt M4 carbine family issued to the U.S. military) with a proprietary short-stroke gas piston system from the Heckler & Koch G36.

The initial G95 (later designated G95K) was a variant of the HK416A7 that was adopted by the German KSK and KSM special forces units in 2017. The G95A1 and the shorter G95KA1, based on the HK416A8, were adopted by the greater Bundeswehr in 2025, replacing the G36; the G95KA1 configuration is the standard issue service rifle for the German Army (Heer).

== History ==
The G95's parent design, the HK416 platform, was originally developed by Heckler & Koch at the request of the United States Army's Delta Force for a new close-quarters combat carbine in the 1990s. At this point, the unit's Heckler & Koch MP5 submachine gun, which fired the 9mm NATO cartridge, was considered too weak while the Colt M4 carbine with its 368 mm (14.5 in) barrel was considered too large, particularly when fitted with a suppressor; initial versions of the 262 mm (10.3 in) barrel Close Quarters Battle Receiver (CQBR) for the M4 was also not considered reliable enough. Originally called the "Heckler & Koch M4", the design incorporated the short-stroke piston system from the company's G36 into the basic AR-15 configuration. Later redesignated the "HK416" in response to a trademark infringement suit filed by Colt Defense, the weapon in its 264 mm (10.4 in) short-barrel configuration was adopted by Delta Force in March 2005; numerous special forces units would follow suit, such as SEAL Team 6 (or DEVGRU), Poland's GROM, and Netherlands' KCT.

The HK416 proved highly successful and in addition to special forces units, was adopted in its longer barreled formats by numerous larger scale military forces, such as the Norwegian Armed Forces (HK416N) in 2008, the United States Marine Corps as the M27 Infantry Automatic Rifle in 2011, and the French Armed Forces (HK416F) in 2017. German military adoption of the rifle began in 2017, when the KSK and KSM adopted the HK416A7 variant with a 368 mm (14.5 in) barrel as the G95, later designated G95K.

In 2017, the Bundeswehr began the System Sturmgewehr Bundeswehr (Bundeswehr Assault Rifle System) effort to replace the G36. This was spurred in part by the G36's accuracy issues from thermal expansion in hot weather or heavy firing schedules. Weapons put forth were the Heckler & Koch HK416, HK433, and Haenel MK 556. Initially, C.G. Haenel won the competition in September 2020 with their MK 556. However, German authorities cancelled the contract the next month, amid allegations that the MK 556 infringed on Heckler & Koch patents, and the HK416A8 was selected in early 2021. Haenel sued to attempt to reverse the decision, but a German court dismissed the lawsuit in June 2022.

In March 2021, the German Federal Ministry of Defence announced the adoption of the HK416A8 to supersede the G36 as the standard issue rifle, and in December 2022, the Bundestag approved initial funding to begin procuring the rifles. The Bundeswehr expected to purchase 118,718 rifles, designated G95A1 with a 419 mm (16.5 in) barrel and G95KA1 with a 355 mm (14.0 in) barrel. The shorter G95KA1 is the standard mass-issue version while the G95A1 is used when the benefits of the longer barrel, such as greater bullet velocity, are desired; the rifles were first issued in 2025.

Germany reportedly considered up to 250,000 additional Heckler & Koch G95A1 and G95KA1 assault rifles, potentially doubling the Bundeswehr's planned inventory to 500,000 weapons to equip active units, reservists, and homeland-defense forces.

In October 2026, Ukrainian Special Operations Forces received G95s.

== Design details ==
Short-stroke gas piston

The G95, as a variant of the Heckler & Koch HK416, uses a proprietary short-stroke gas piston system that derives from the company's G36. The HK system uses a short-stroke piston driving an operating rod to force the bolt carrier to the rear. This design prevents combustion gases from entering the G95's interior—a shortcoming with direct impingement systems. The reduction in heat and fouling of the bolt carrier group increases the reliability of the G95 and extends the interval between stoppages. During factory tests the design fired 10,000 rounds in full-auto without malfunctioning.

The G95 has a user-adjustable gas regulator and is equipped with a proprietary accessory rail forearm with MIL-STD-1913 rails on the top and bottom, and "HKey" (for G95) or M-LOK (for G95A1 and G95KA1) rail system for direct accessory attachment onto the "negative space" (hollow slot) mounting points on the sides; this allows the G95 to fit most modern accessories. The rail forearm is "free-floating" and does not contact the barrel, improving accuracy. The rifle has an adjustable multi-position telescopic butt stock, offering six different lengths of pull. It can also be switched out for other variations like Magpul stocks. The rifle feeds from a STANAG 5.56mm NATO magazine. The trigger pull is 34 N (7.6 lb_{f}). The G95's barrel is cold hammer-forged with a 20,000-round service life and features a 6-groove 1-in-178 mm (7.0 in) right hand twist. The cold hammer-forging process provides a stronger barrel for greater safety in case of an obstructed bore or for extended firing sessions. To reduce the risk of slam-firing, the G95 has a firing pin safety in the bolt. Another adjustment from the standard AR-15 design is the ambidextrous safety selector lever that rotates in 45 degree increments rather than 90 degrees. The G95A1 and G95KA1 have ambidextrous bolt catch, bolt release, and charging handle to facilitate both left-handed and right-handed use; the original G95 also had an ambidextrous magazine release, which was later removed due to user feedback.

The standard German Army configuration of the G95A1 (419 mm barrel) and G95KA1 (355 mm barrel) has a tan/flat dark earth color (RAL 8000) for its anodizing and furniture, and is equipped with the ELCAN Specter DR 1-4 optic. The optic also has a backup red-dot sight mounted on top. An optional cheek riser can be mounted. Compared to the G95/HK416A7, the initial HK416A8 had height-adjustable shoulder support on the stock, a steeper grip angle as well as a shorter handguard and thinner barrel profile to comply with the required ≤ 3.5 kg (7.72 lb) weight limit according to the tender. However, after evaluations and trials, the G95A1 and G95KA1 as adopted reverted to the original shallower grip angle as well as a slimmer buttstock and longer handguard with a cutout for accessing the gas regulator; the handguard's "HKey" interface was also replaced with M-LOK.

== Variants ==
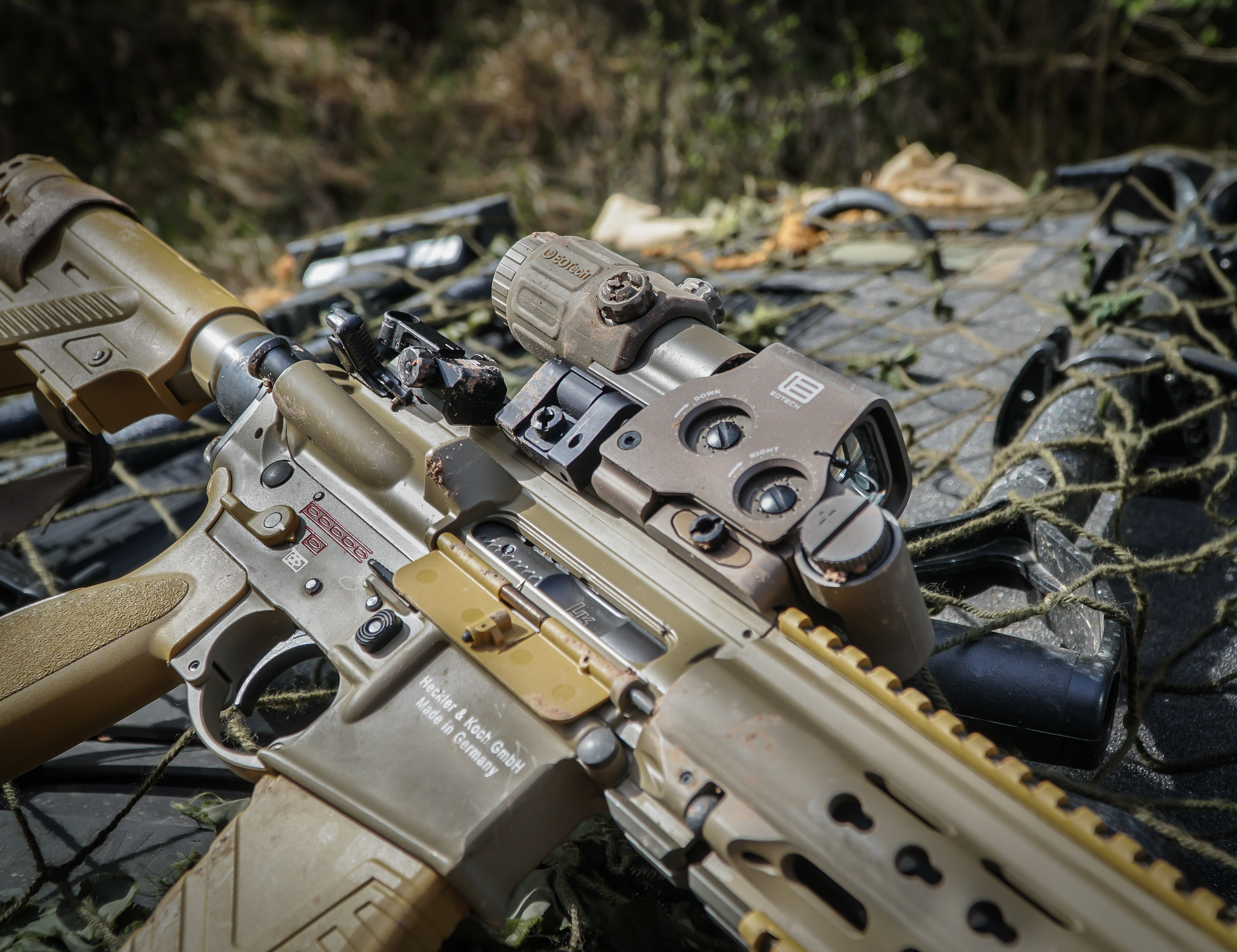
A close-up image of a G95's fire selector with tan color EOTech EXPS3-0 holographic weapon sight and G33 magnifier on the receiver rail

G95
Also called G95K, based on the HK416A7 and used by the KSK and KSM. This variant has a 368 mm (14.5 in) barrel and the handguard has a proprietary "HKey" interface similar to the VLTOR KeyMod (but not identical) on the sides.
G95A1
Based on the HK416A8, used by the Germany Army. The A1 has 419 mm (16.5 in) barrel with thinner profile, and the "HKey" interface was replaced by M-LOK on the handguard.
G95KA1
Similar to the G95A1, but with a shorter 355 mm (14.0 in) barrel. This is the standard G95 configuration for majority of the German Army.

Specification		G95K	G95KA1	G95A1
Length	Maximum (weapon)	890 mm (35.0 in)	878 mm (34.6 in)	942 mm (37.1 in)
Length	Minimum (weapon)	808 mm (31.8 in)	796 mm (31.3 in)	860 mm (33.9 in)
Length	Barrel length	368 mm (14.5 in)	355 mm (14.0 in)	419 mm (16.5 in)
Weight	Without attachments	3.7 kg (8.2 lb)	3.3 kg (7.3 lb)	3.4 kg (7.5 lb)
Weight	With optics, laser light module and full magazine	—	4.3 kg (9.5 lb)	4.4 kg (9.7 lb)
Effective combat range		—	450 m (492 yd)	—

== Users ==
- (Germany) Bundeswehr
  - KSK and KSM: G95
  - German Army: G95A1 and G95KA1
- Armed Forces of Ukraine
  - Special Operations Forces: G95

== See also ==
- Beretta ARX160
- Haenel MK 556
- IWI Tavor
- M27 Infantry Automatic Rifle
- M7 rifle
- Sako M23
- Steyr AUG

Preceded by Heckler & Koch G36	German Army rifle 2025–present	Succeeded by current
