= Haenel MK 556 =

NATO assault rifle

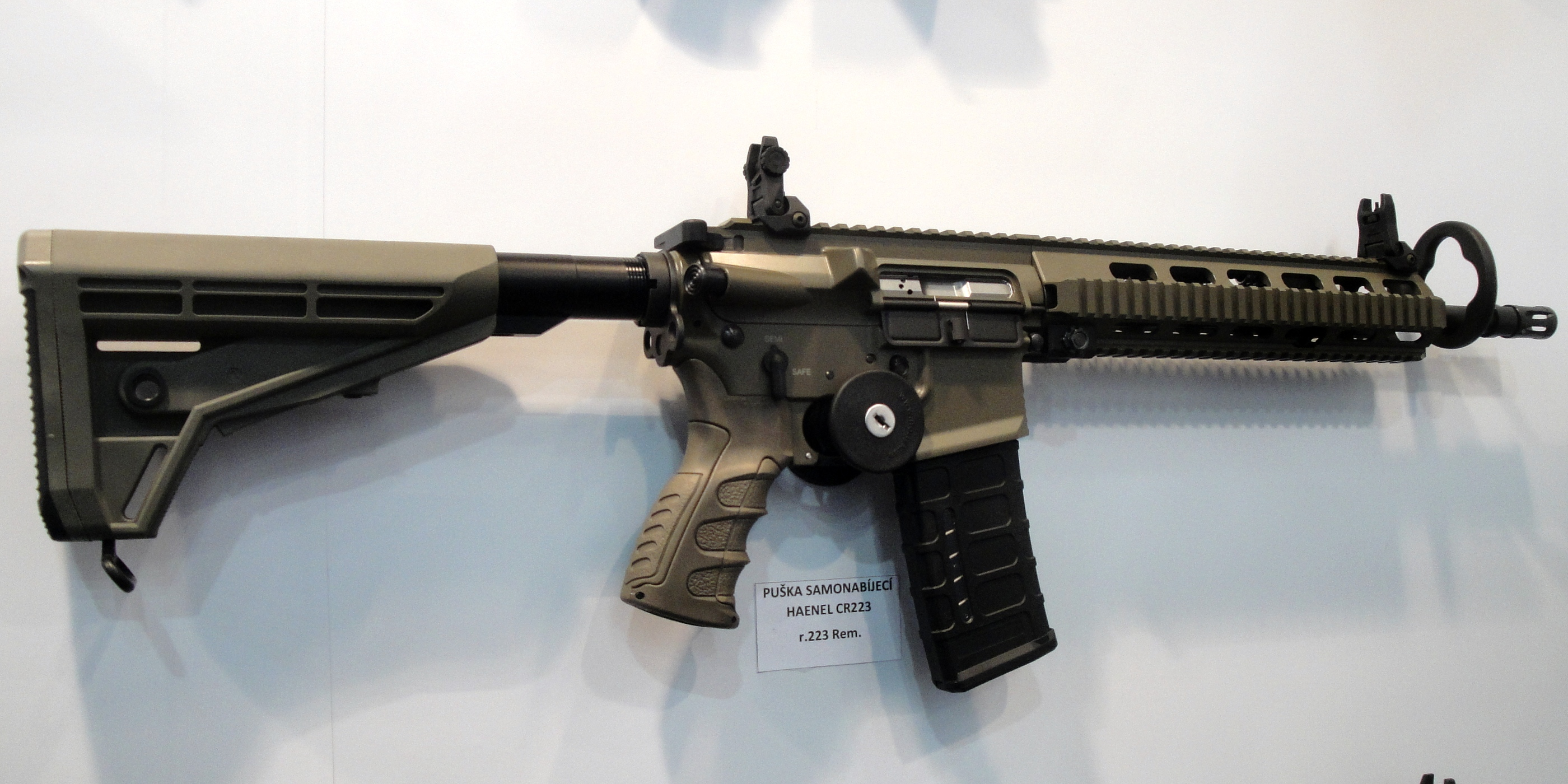
- The Haenel CR 223 semi-auto version of the MK 556 rifle
- Type: Assault rifle Carbine; Semi-automatic rifle (CR series)
- Place of origin: Germany

Service history
- In service: 2024–present
- Wars: Russo-Ukrainian war

Production history
- Designer: C.G. Haenel
- Manufacturer: C.G. Haenel

Specifications
- Mass: 3.6 kg (7.94 lb) 408 mm barrel 3.5 kg (7.7 lb) 368 mm barrel 3.4 kg (7.5 lb) 318 mm barrel 3.35 kg (7.4 lb) 266 mm barrel
- Length: 923–838 mm (36.34–32.99 in) 408 mm barrel 838–798 mm (33.0–31.4 in) 368 mm barrel 812–748 mm (32.0–29.4 in) 318 mm barrel 781–696 mm (30.7–27.4 in) 266 mm barrel
- Barrel length: 408 mm (16.1 in); 368 mm (14.5 in); 318 mm (12.5 in); 266 mm (10.5 in)
- Cartridge: 5.56×45mm NATO
- Action: Short-stroke piston, rotating bolt
- Rate of fire: 900 rounds/minute
- Feed system: 30-round detachable STANAG magazine, 100-round detachable Beta C-Mag

The Haenel MK 556 (German: Maschinenkarabiner) is a gas-operated selective-fire 5.56×45mm NATO assault rifle designed by German company C.G. Haenel. The MK 556 was finalised in September 2020, and it is a fully automatic version of an earlier Haenel design, the CR 223, which was already in limited use by law enforcement agencies since 2017. On 14 September 2020, the Haenel MK 556 was selected by the German Armed Forces (Bundeswehr) as a replacement for the G36, before the decision was revoked over patent infringement and legal concerns.

In order to replace the G36, the German Federal Ministry of Defence put forth the "Assault Rifle System", which the MK 556 won, leading to a purchase of the rifle, which was withdrawn on 9 October 2020, citing suspicion of breaches of public procurement law and concerns about alleged patent infringements by C.G. Haenel to the detriment of the other bidder company, Heckler & Koch. The German Federal Defence Minister Annegret Kramp-Karrenbauer (CDU) had this communicated to the Defence Committee of the German Federal Parliament. The decision followed a crisis meeting with representatives of the procurement office. The offers of the bidders will be reassessed by the procurement office against this background.

On 14 October 2020, media reports emerged, doubting patent infringements regarding the Bundeswehr MK 556 versions being offered by C.G. Haenel to the detriment of Heckler & Koch. Furthermore, reports regarding patent infringements by Haenel's German box magazine sub-supplier Oberland Arms to the detriment of Magpul Industries emerged. Oberland Arms polymer box magazines were commercially launched to European consumers in 2009. German media have tried to obtain more information from Magpul Industries and C.G. Haenel, but since 13 October 2020 no new information appeared that could substantiate a magazine patent litigation.

On 2 March 2021 the German Federal Ministry of Defence officially announced, after evaluating all submitted documents, the offer from C.G. Haenel was excluded from the further award procedure. The company has already been informed of this. It is now intended to award the contract to Heckler & Koch. C.G. Haenel announced on 3 March 2021 the federal government's decision will be reviewed and "all necessary legal steps will be taken to protect our interests". According to public procurement lawyers, the final decision on the new assault rifle could be delayed until all legal actions are exhausted. This may delay any future contract award for years until the matter is settled and lead to compensation payments. Within a week, German media started reporting on initiated legal actions as a result of the award revocation.

== History ==
=== "Assault Rifle System" tender for the Bundeswehr ===
On 21 April 2017, the German Ministry of Defence began its program by putting out a tender to look for a service rifle to replace the Heckler & Koch G36, which has been standard issue in the Bundeswehr since the 1990s. The main issue cited with the G36 was that it became inaccurate when it overheated, either because of continuous fire, or the climate it was in.

The System Sturmgewehr Bundeswehr tender was calling for up to 120,000 new rifles including accessories with an estimated total worth of €245 million without VAT (the annual German defence budget for 2020 is €45.646 billion.) In order for the rifle to see production, a parliamentary consensus is required. The first set of rifles were scheduled to be sent in the final week of October 2020, and the weapon's laser sights, optics, and other attachments in mid-December. Some of the requirements in the tender were a rifle chambered in 5.56×45mm NATO or 7.62×51mm NATO, with ambidextrous controls, a maximum weight of 3.6 kg (7.94 lb) without a magazine and aiming optics, box magazines with an empty maximum weight of 160 grams (5.6 oz) and a receiver service life of at least 30,000 rounds (barrel 15,000 ball or 7,500 hard-core rounds) as well as interchangeable long- and short-barrel variants. Accessories required included bayonet, sound suppressor, drum magazine, bipod, forward grip, special bolt for training cartridges, cartridge case catching bag, cleaning kit, carry sling and transport bag. The rifle was required to be able to function in areas with climate categories A1-3, B1-3, C0-3 and M1-3 according to STANAG 4370 Environmental Testing Procedures without restriction (with the exception of electrical components). The "Assault Rifle System" tender also stipulated that the technology used in the offers should not be subject to foreign approval or regulations from the International Traffic in Arms Regulations, an American set of laws that dictate the export of defense and military related technologies.

=== Participants ===
Several companies participated, including SIG Sauer with the SIG MCX and Rheinmetall/Steyr with the RS556, but both dropped out early. According to Die Zeit, SIG Sauer asserted that the tests were not impartial, and were given insufficient testing ammunition in response to their complaints. The only remaining companies were Heckler & Koch with two separate rifles, the HK416 (selected in October 2017 in a separate tender for limited use by the German KSK and KSM special forces), and the HK433, which combines features of the G36 and the HK416 families of assault rifles, and C.G. Haenel with the (second generation) MK 556.

In October 2018, none of the weapons submitted met the required technical criteria. Heckler & Koch and C.G. Haenel were given a deadline for further development. The tests of the improved weapons began on 18 February 2019 and were completed in the autumn of 2019 according to modified planning. Heckler & Koch criticized the Ministry of Defence in 2019 for the strict requirements, claiming that no 5.56×45mm NATO chambered rifle would have been able to meet the given demands, and also complained about a lack of expertise and neutrality in the proceedings. On 8 November 2019, the Federal German Armed Forces Technical Center for Weapons and Ammunition (WTD 91) stated in a final report that all the presented weapons had successfully passed the technical tests and met the Bundeswehr's technical requirements.

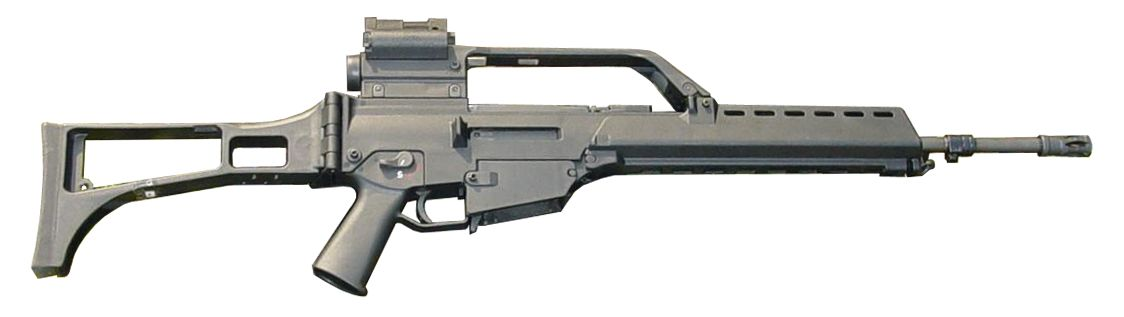
G36 service rifle to be replaced

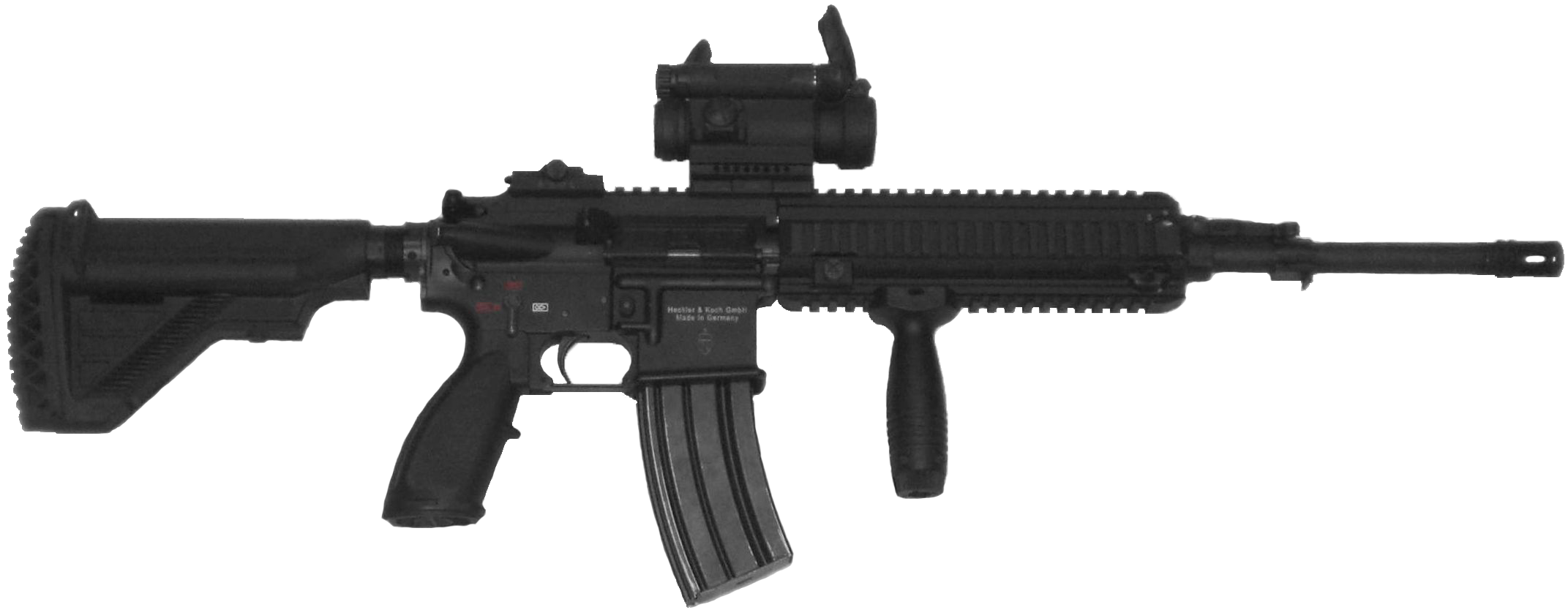
HK416 as issued by Norway. The HK416 is already in use by special forces units in the Bundeswehr.

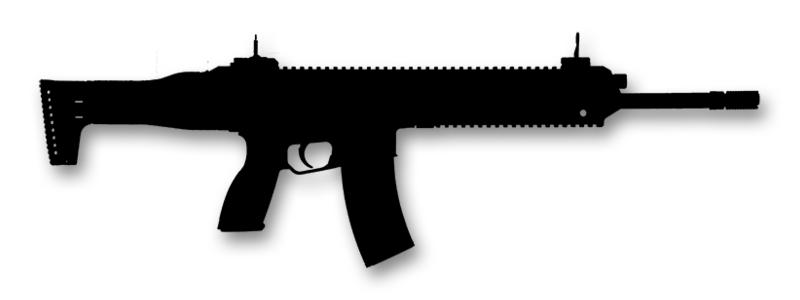
HK433

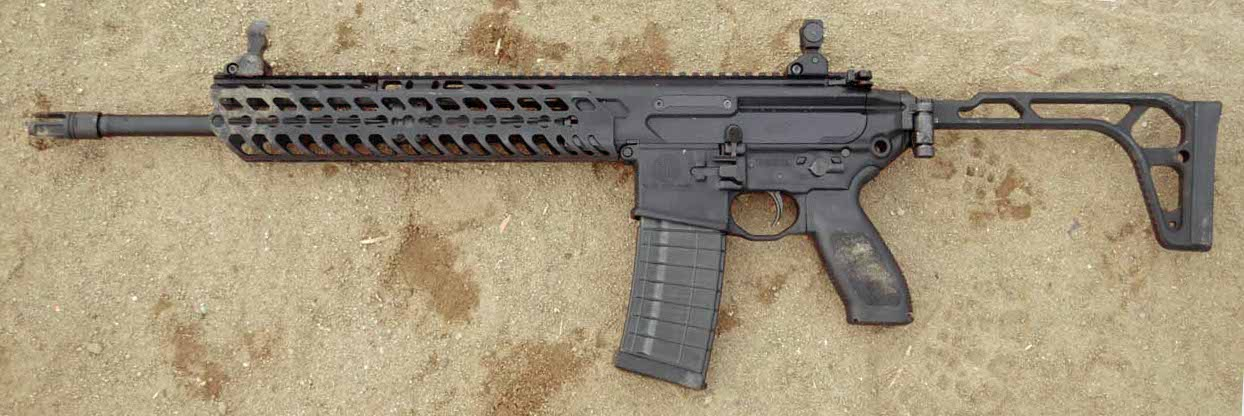
SIG MCX withdrawn from the tender

=== Tender choice ===
In September 2020, the MK 556 won the "Assault Rifle System" tender for the future service rifle of the Bundeswehr. According to the German Press Agency (DPA) "C.G. Haenel presented a weapon that, in extensive tests, was somewhat better tailored to the requirements of the military and also proved to be economically advantageous."

The decision for the MK 556 was announced on 15 September 2020. The same day the decision was announced, the Ministry of Defence released an official statement:

"Assault Rifle System Bundeswehr": Winner of the tender when awarded

Berlin, 15 September 2020

The "assault rifle" (System Sturmgewehr Bundeswehr) award procedure has made another major step forward. From the now completed evaluation of the offers by the registration office of the procurement office in Koblenz, C.G. Haenel GmbH, limited liability company, emerged as the winner of the tender.

On 14 May 2020, the bidders remaining in the System Assault Rifle Basic Weapon award procedure were asked to submit a Best And Final Offer (BAFO). The deadline for submitting bids ended on June 15, 2020. The bids received from the bidders have meanwhile been evaluated by the contracting authority.

From this evaluation, the C.G. Haenel GmbH, a limited liability company, emerged as the winner of the tender. The result of the evaluation is not yet legally effective. Legal recourse is always open to unsuccessful bidders.

The decision of the registry is also subject to parliamentary approval in the context of the €25 million bill. The documents required for this are currently being prepared, with the aim of a parliamentary referral at the end of 2020.

On 21 September 2020, C.G. Haenel announced it wants to manufacture the rifles mainly in Germany. The German production share should be 90 percent and benefit the economic region in southern Thuringia.

=== Legal steps regarding the decision ===
On 15 September 2020 Heckler & Koch announced they were examining legal steps regarding the decision. On 24 September 2020 Heckler & Koch announced the company has lodged a complaint with the procurement office against the outcome of the bidding process. The complaint can also later be used by the unsuccessful bidder for further legal steps against the award. According to Heckler & Koch, they had called a price well below the maximum volume, but Haenel had undercut it by a further €51 million.

On 29 September 2020, the Deutsche Presse-Agentur reported that Heckler & Koch took further legal action effectively suspending the process. According to the dpa, the initial bid of Heckler & Koch was €235 million, which was ultimately lowered to €179 million. The final offer of Haenel undercut Heckler & Koch's final offer by about €50 million. According to Business Insider, in a leaked report issued on 5 October 2020, Haenel offered the MK 556 assault rifles including accessories for around €152 million, including 19 percent VAT. Heckler & Koch offered their rifles for €179 million, making Haenel's final offer €27 million or 18 percent cheaper. Regarding the choice, the secret report says: "The main criterion is the lower price, with a technically comparable performance." The offered rifles all passed the Federal German Armed Forces Technical Center for Weapons and Ammunition (WTD 91) tests. The overall project risk is assessed by the procurement office experts as "medium". The intended contract with C.G. Haenel apparently has a number of tough clauses and regulations to protect the Bundeswehr against risks.

On 9 October 2020, the German Federal Ministry of Defence withdrew their intended award decision, seemingly leaving the potential remaining G36 replacements as either the HK416, HK433 or MK 556 after concluding a re-entered evaluation phase. Regarding this decision, the Ministry of Defence issued the following statement (machine translated from German):

Assault rifle of the German Armed Forces: Status of the award procedure (published on 09.10.2020)

On the basis of the request for a review by the company Heckler & Koch received by the 1st Federal Procurement Chamber at the Federal Cartel Office on 30 September 2020, the Federal Procurement Office (BAAINBw Federal Office for Equipment, Information Technology and Use of the Bundeswehr) for the first time verifiable of a possible patent infringement by the company C.G. Haenel GmbH with limited liability knowledge.

The internal examinations initiated thereupon led to the result that a corresponding patent infringement by the bidder C.G. Haenel GmbH with limited liability at the expense of the bidder Heckler & Koch cannot be ruled out.

Against this background, the federal awarding authority was required to send the information letter (Section 134 GWB) to the bidders about the intended award of the contract to the company C.G. Haenel GmbH with limited liability cancel.

The federal awarding authority will thus re-evaluate the offers, taking all aspects into account.

Since then it is completely open which supplier will be awarded the "Assault Rifle System" contract and when a decision will be made.

C.G. Haenel announced in late November 2020 they have initiated appropriate legal steps. According to a letter to Bild from Haenel managing director Olaf Sauer, "the MK 556 is a different rifle with different design features compared with the CR 223 and not addressed in the patent lawsuit. The patented technology is not used in the MK 556."

According to a video produced by Heckler & Koch, important breech components of the CR 223 are interchangeable with the HK416. The video is used to support Heckler & Koch's allegation that the MK 556 infringed upon their intellectual property. To legally clarify whether Heckler & Koch's allegations were relevant to the Bundeswehr tender, an evidence preservation drive occurred at C.G. Haenel's headquarters in December 2020, under the orders of the Düsseldorf Regional Court, so that evidence could be secured for a patent lawsuit. The Technical Center for Weapons and Ammunition (WTD 91), which tested the rifles offered by both companies, was also requested not to continue using the submitted test weapons and to store them.

On 18 December 2020, German media reported a patent attorney commissioned by the Ministry of Defence came to the conclusion that C.G. Haenel had infringed patents of other companies in the submitted MK 556 weapon, which could subsequently exclude the company from the award. C.G. Haenel was given time until mid-January 2021 to comment on the results of the patent assessment, according to a Bundestag Defence Committee chairpersons briefing. A spokeswoman for the Ministry of Defence said: "By withdrawing the surcharge, we signaled that we had doubts regarding patent legislation. And the report that has now been submitted strengthens our view. But now the report still has to be evaluated by the procurement office." "All parties are given the opportunity to comment," she emphasized.

On 14 January 2021, German media reported that the law firm Kohler Schmid Möbus from Stuttgart investigated the case and sent three confidential reports to the Ministry of Defense just before 25 December 2020. Possible infringements of patent law in relation to the so-called "over-the-beach" (OTB) patent and the magazines offered by C.G. Haenel were investigated. According to information from Business Insider, the Stuttgart patent attorneys in two reports concluded that these patents have been infringed, but these infringements are not very significant. In the third report, the patent attorneys investigated whether a lawsuit initiated by C.G. Haenel for the nullity of Heckler & Koch's "over-the-beach" patent legal dispute could be successful, which they concluded was possible. In case these reports are correct, the Ministry faces a delivery cost and/or delivery time problem as legal deadlines will have expired before April 2021 if both companies are not willing to solve their legal disputes.

On 31 January 2021, German media reported that C.G. Haenel is willing to take legal action if necessary to finally get the order that was initially awarded and then withdrawn. Haenel managing director Olaf Sauer announced in the Frankfurter Allgemeine Zeitung that he would sue if his company should not be considered.

On 20 February 2021, Business Insider reported the Bundeswehr in the near future wants to officially announce the revocation of the controversial contract and internally expects that C.G. Haenel will take legal action when excluded. On 3 March 2021, Business Insider reported C.G. Haenel had rejected patent violations allegations in a confidential official statement to the Bundestag Defence Committee on 18 January 2021, and that the box magazine was not part of the final offer anyway and that they reserved the right to deliver another magazine or even to build one themselves. Bundeswehr lawyers regarded this course of events as inadmissible renegotiation.

Should Oberland Arms and/or Haenel actually use patented parts without permission, this would not only be a matter between the supplier and the manufacturer. Rather, the procurement guidelines of the Bundeswehr expressly oblige the contracting parties to guarantee that their products are free from third-party rights. The procurement office does not necessarily have to wait for the outcome of a patent dispute, which usually lasts several years. It must assess the risk a dispute poses for the manufacturer's ability to deliver, especially if the patent judges come to a different assessment of the situation in the future.

According to public procurement lawyers, shortly after the official order revocation announcement on 2 March 2021 by the German Federal Ministry of Defence, the final decision on the new assault rifle could be delayed until all legal actions are exhausted. This may delay any future contract award for years until the matter is settled and lead to compensation payments. Within a week German media started reporting on initiated legal actions as a result of the award revocation. After the second step of the legal actions path C.G. Haenel financial director Swen Lahl announced in the Südthüringer Zeitung on 13 March 2021 that Haenel would be willing to go through all authorities and courts.

On 24 April 2021, media reports regarding possible patent infringements by a Heckler & Koch box magazine to the detriment of Magpul Industries emerged. Magpul Industries sent letters to Heckler & Koch, which were also forwarded to the Bundeswehr. The American company was convinced the HK Gen3 polymer magazine infringed on Magpul's patents and asked Heckler & Koch whether the magazine in question is part of the Heckler & Koch offer to the Bundeswehr. It is unclear how the German Ministry of Defence would like to proceed.

On 10 June 2021, German media reported the Federal Public Procurement Chamber had rejected the review request by C.G. Heanel. The public procurement tribunal, which is located at the Federal Cartel Office in Bonn, has expressly stated that "the Federal Ministry of Defense rightly intends to award the contract to Heckler & Koch GmbH in this procurement procedure." C.G. Haenel can appeal against the Federal Public Procurement Chamber decision at the Düsseldorf Regional Court. The media consider that likely and estimate such a legal action could take three to five months. On 3 July 2021, German media reported the Federal Armed Forces Procurement Office made serious mistakes when awarding the contract. The Federal Cartel Office criticized the fact that the arms manufacturer C.G. Haenel was able to improperly improve its offer. According to the dpa news agency, citing a decision by the judges of the public procurement tribunal at the Federal Cartel Office, the procurement authority had contacted the bidders after their last possible final offers. Heckler & Koch stuck to its final offer - knowing that changes would no longer be valid anyway. C.G. Haenel changed its offer and price. The "concretization" of the price meant that Haenel "made a more economical offer", according to the decision. "Here the measure led inadmissibly to a change in the ranking order." This was "inadmissible".

On 21 and 22 July 2021, German media reported C.G. Haenel lodged a complaint at the Düsseldorf Regional Court after a for the company negative decision by the Federal Cartel Office. According to a court spokeswoman, the hearing is scheduled for 2 March 2022. Haenel's financial director Swen Lahl does not expect a decision by the court until the second quarter of 2022. According to Lahl, until the federal government announces its final decision and the Bundestag approves the budget, it should be the end of 2022. Then 400 test weapons would be produced, which the Bundeswehr tests under different conditions. Only when this is completed does the next step follow: "Whoever wins the contract - series production should not start until 2024." Haenel also rejects the patent infringement allegations by Heckler & Koch and Haenel's managing director Olaf Sauer stated: "We have a written agreement with the US company Magpul that we are allowed to use the magazine." The dispute over the MK 556 over-the-beach capability is the subject of two previously initiated proceedings; a patent suit initiated by Heckler & Koch before the Düsseldorf Regional Court expected to start in October 2021 and a filed patent nullity suit initiated by Haenel at the Federal Patent Court in Munich. According to German media it is unclear when the Federal Patent Court in Munich will decide on this. It could be during 2022 or as late as 2023.

On 16 November 2021, the Düsseldorf Lower Regional Court ruled C.G. Haenel infringed a Heckler & Koch patent and on 20 November 2021 German media reported the complaint procedure at the Düsseldorf Regional Court after a for C.G. Haenel negative decision by the Federal Cartel Office will probably start during the spring in 2022. The complaint procudure started in March 2022 and Heckler & Koch was summoned to the proceedings as an interested party. German media expect a decision on 6 April 2022. The Regional Court was the final instance in the complaints procedure making it clear that the award decision remains in place. In June 2022 the Düsseldorf Regional Court rejected Haenel's lawsuit against being excluded from the bidding process, implying that the award decision remains in place.

On 30 September 2022, partial success for C.G. Haenel in the "over-the-beach" (OTB) patent dispute with Heckler & Koch was reported by German media. The Federal Patent Court in Munich partially invalidated Heckler & Koch's patent in Germany. Other courts will probably have to decide whether this partial nullity judgment is sufficient for C.G. Haenel to obtain some compensation payments.

=== Political views and developments ===
Bundestag (German federal parliament) representatives of the Grüne and FDP political parties protested against awarding the Suhl, Thuringia-based bidder C.G. Haenel, because it is a subsidiary of other companies that are financially owned by the United Arab Emirates.

Landtag of Thuringia FDP representative Robert-Martin Montag deems the expressed award criticism regarding C.G. Haenel as absurd, claiming that "if you follow the arguments of the Grüne and FDP Bundestag representatives, you shouldn't import oil from Saudi Arabia or buy Mercedes-Benz cars because Kuwait has a stake in Daimler. Both countries are also involved in the Yemeni Civil War." Bundestag representatives of the CDU and CSU political parties, that together with the SPD support the German government, do not share the views of the Grüne and FDP regarding awarding C.G. Haenel.

According to the Frankfurter Allgemeine Zeitung, they expressed quite similar thoughts, opinions and views as Robert-Martin Montag. According to Deputy Chairman of the Defence Committee of the German federal parliament Karl A. Lamers (CDU), it was "more often the case that investors from all over the world are involved in such companies". He specified how it was imperative "that our soldiers get a good rifle and that the price is good". The Ministry of Defence stated that the ownership structure of the bidding companies should not play a legal role in the proceedings. Its procurement office is bound by tender legislation and was only allowed to consider quality and price.

Business Insider reported on 19 October 2020, the German Federal Defence Minister recently felt compelled to pause the process and informed her Secretary of State for Equipment, Cyber/Information Technology and Planning that any further steps and any communication regarding the planned acquisition of new assault rifles is subject to ″leadership restriction″. This means the minister wants to personally decide how things will proceed in a politically sensitive armament project.

A public document that the Ministry of Defence forwarded to the Bundestag Defence Committee on 26 October 2020 stated, that the ministry would partially restart the procurement process for the new standard assault rifle. No new technical investigations of the assault rifles offered by Heckler & Koch and C.G. Haenel are planned. Planned are a legal and economic assessment of the offers and how an initiated patent lawsuit between Heckler & Koch and C.G. Haenel at the Düsseldorf Regional Court might affect the offers. For this the ministry will involve an external independent patent attorney as an expert to assess consequences regarding the award procedure. In order to avoid problems of this kind in the future, new examination mechanisms are to be introduced within the procurement office. The Ministry of Defence offered the Bundestag Defence Committee to further discuss the submitted document in detail.

According to Business Insider on 28 October 2020, a final test report of the weapons tests states all weapons met the Bundeswehr technical requirements, but the HK416 was more accurate and less prone to failure than the MK 556 during the technical investigations. "Overall, it can be stated, that the weapons from Haenel still have potential for improving individual components" according to the confidential internal report. Without full access to the report, no well-founded technical conclusions can be drawn from this information regarding the tested weapons.

The Bundestag Defence Committee discussed the developments regarding a new G36 replacement decision in a meeting on 30 October 2020. The Tagesschau reported a serious allegation might have been discussed in the confidential meeting. After the submission of the final offers, the procurement office is said to have renegotiated with C.G. Haenel, which would be illegal. The procurement office can only ask questions if there are any ambiguities regarding received best and final offers. Queries that would change such offers are not allowed. The Tagesschau later on 30 October 2020 reported on German national television that the German Federal Defence Minister after the meeting, personally accompanied by senior civil servants, declined to comment on the new assault rifle topic and an independent advice commission should accompany further proceedings. On the same day after the meeting, Der Spiegel and the Frankfurter Allgemeine Zeitung asserted the Bundeswehr has to wait years for a new assault rifle and that almost all Bundestag Defence Committee members fear that one of the two bidders will be expelled of the proceedings by a court because of the various allegations. In this case, neither the ministry nor the Bundestag could have influence on the selection of a new assault rifle for the Bundeswehr. In November 2020 C.G. Haenel started lobbying towards Bundestag members to be awarded the contract. The Südthüringer Zeitung reported the Ministry of Defence, according to an internal crisis scenario, does not expect delivery of the first batch of new assault rifles until 2024 and expects the minister will personally decide in the coming months how to further proceed.

According to German media on 1 March 2021, the Ministry of Defence informed the Bundestag Defence Committee they decided not to award the new assault rifle order to C.G. Haenel. The proceeding was justified with expert report indications of patent infringements at the detriment of Heckler & Koch and Magpul Industries. Regarding the prospective award revocation, it is expected C.G. Haenel will file a complaint at the procurement office and later take legal action that can lead to possible compensation payments.

== Design and features ==
Short-stroke gas piston

The MK 556 is a gas operated, select fire assault rifle that fires from a closed rotary bolt.

The MK 556 is based on the AR-15 platform ergonomic architecture, but uses a short-stroke gas piston operating system (unlike the AR-15's piston-operated gas impingement system) with a user-adjustable gas system. With the help of the regulator, the gas system can be adjusted to function reliably with various propellant, projectile, fouling, operating environment and configuration specific pressure behavior. It features a firing pin safety to reduce the risk of slam-firing and the cold hammer forged barrel has a 178 mm (7.0 in) twist rate and features a standard A2-style flash suppressor at its muzzle end.

The MK 556 shares many features with the CAR 816 assault rifle, manufactured under licence by C.G. Haenel on behalf of its parent company, Caracal International, under the EDGE Group, as well as the Haenel CR 223 semi-automatic rifle, which is designed for use by civilians, police and law enforcement agencies alike. These rifles share a modular construction to simplify substitution of parts and are compatible with furniture and other accessories that conform to the AR-15/M16/M4 standard. The MK 556, as well as the CR 223, are "over-the-beach" tested and certified, meaning that the rifle can be fired safely, as quickly as possible after being carried through water.

=== Stock ===
The MK 556 has a three piece stock.

The MK 556 handguard features four STANAG 4694 NATO Accessory Rails that are backwards-compatible with the STANAG 2324/MIL-STD-1913 Picatinny rail. These allow for direct accessory attachment onto the rail mounting points, and can be removed without the usage of tools.

The shoulder stock or buttstock is a telescoping 6 position type stock which is adjustable for length of pull.

The adjustable pistol grip is located behind the trigger and completes the stock.

=== Trigger ===
The MK 556 uses a direct trigger with a trigger pull set at 32 N (3.3 kg_{f}; 7.2 lb_{f}).
A two-stage trigger with a pressure point that can be set at 15 N (1.5 kg_{f}; 3.4 lb_{f}) trigger pull is available for precision orientated users.

=== Fire selector ===
The fire and safety selector settings are marked with letters: "S"—safe ("Sicher"), "E"—semi-automatic fire ("Einzelfeuer") and "F"—continuous fire ("Feuerstoß"). The three position fire selector can be ordered in 0°/60°/120° or – like in the M16 family of service rifles – 0°/90°/180° rotation between the settings.

=== Sights ===
The MK 556's basic version features rail mounted polymer flip up sights. The integrated rail on the upper receiver and its continuation on the handguard at the 12 o'clock position allows for the adaptation of various aiming optics.

=== Feeding ===
The MK 556 features a Draft STANAG 4179 compliant magazine well and is fed with STANAG magazines with a standard capacity of 30 rounds. Other STANAG compatible box and drum magazines can be used.

== Variants ==
=== Non select-fire ===
==== CR 223 ====
Civilian semi-automatic fire only variant of the MK 556 chambered for .223 Remington/5.56×45mm NATO.

==== CR 300 ====
Semi-automatic fire only variant chambered for .300 AAC Blackout.

This variant can be only be ordered with 229 mm (9.0 in) or 267 mm (10.5 in) barrels.

==== CR 308 ====
Enlarged semi-automatic fire only variants chambered for .308 Winchester.

==== CR 6,5 ====
Enlarged semi-automatic fire only variants chambered for 6.5mm Creedmoor.

These variants are heavier than the CR 223 and can be ordered with longer 457 mm (18.0 in) or 508 mm (20.0 in) barrels and a two-stage trigger.

==== B&T 15 ====
Short-barreled rifle variant of the CR 223, manufactured by Brügger & Thomet.

B&T plans to have the weapon ready for import into the United States by mid-2021.

=== Instruction and training ===
==== CR 223 Manipulation ====
Red coloured functional training rifle for safe manipulation instructioning that can not be fired.

==== CR 223 ÜB – Training rifle ====
Blue coloured training rifle that can only fire non-lethal marking simunition.

== Users ==
Country	Organization name	Model	Quantity	Date	Reference
Germany	Originally set to replace the G36 as the standard assault rifle for the German Bundeswehr; In 2021 the award for 118,718 rifles to be delivered from 2023 to 2026 was revocated	MK 556	N/A	2020	
Germany	Hamburg Police SEK	CR 223	Unknown number in use	2017	
Germany	Saxony Police	CR 223	Unknown number in use, 2,300 ordered	2017	
Poland	Polish Police ordered the MK 556 as a replacement for the Heckler & Koch HK416	MK 556	546 ordered (279 mm (11.0 in) barrels)	2019	
Ukraine	Ukrainian Armed Forces	MK 556 and CR 308	5,800 as of March 2025 (5,000 planned total)	2024	
