= Kommando Spezialkräfte der Marine =

German commando and amphibious warfare force

Coordinates: 54.4762°N 9.8637°E

Naval Special Forces Command
- Kommando Spezialkräfte der Marine
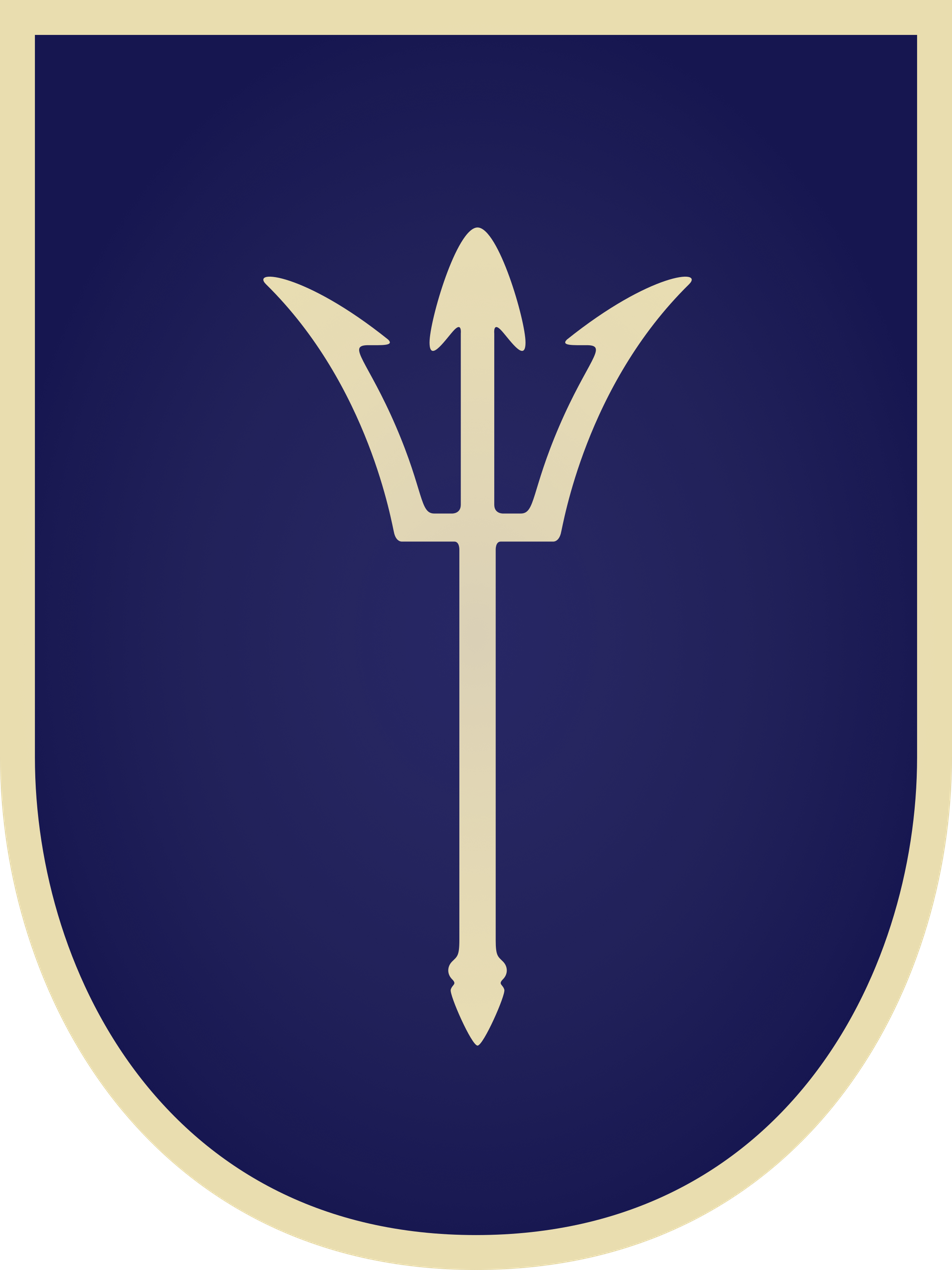
- Active: 1 August 1958 – present
- Country: Germany
- Branch: German Navy
- Type: Special operations force
- Role: Combat diving
- Size: 600 authorized personnel
- Part of: Einsatzflottille 1
- Garrison/HQ: Eckernförde
- Nickname: Kampfschwimmer
- Mottos: Lerne leiden, ohne zu klagen! (Learn to suffer without complaining!)
- Engagements: Gulf War; Yugoslav Wars; Operation Enduring Freedom; International Security Assistance Force; Operation Ocean Shield

The Kommando Spezialkräfte der Marine (KSM; Naval Special Forces Command), also called the Kampfschwimmer (combat swimmers) or Verwendungsgruppe 3402 (Deployment Group 3402), are the special operations unit of the German Navy, specializing in commando and amphibious warfare operations. The Kampfschwimmer were set up when West Germany joined NATO in 1955, making it the oldest German special operations force.

== History ==
This section was translated from de:Kampfschwimmer (Bundeswehr); refer back there in case of query about the translation.

The Kampfschwimmer were set up particularly because Germany joined NATO and there was felt to be risk of war with the Soviet Union. A unit was needed which could help to secure the Baltic Sea exits through the Danish Straits. On 1 August 1958 Group 3402, as these commando frogmen were called by the navy, was set up. It consisted of men without a Nazi past, who had served in World War II in the small combat forces and the naval employment commands.

The first Kampfschwimmer were trained first with the Nageurs de combat in France. France had developed the role of the commando frogmen further in the Indochina war, to the modern single fighter.

The Kampfschwimmer should carry out their tasks both in the water and ashore, like German commando frogmen did in World War II. But now a new dimension was added: airborne operations. This three-role concept of the French became the basis of the commando frogmen of the German navy.

On 1 April 1964, the Kampfschwimmer appeared for the first time as an independent body. In the following years they extended their tasks, but lacked money. Thus e.g. they had to buy their own drysuit undersuits.

During the Gaza war, KSM reportedly deployed to Cyprus alongside the Army's KSK and the Federal Police's GSG 9 for possible evacuations or hostage rescues.

== Roles ==
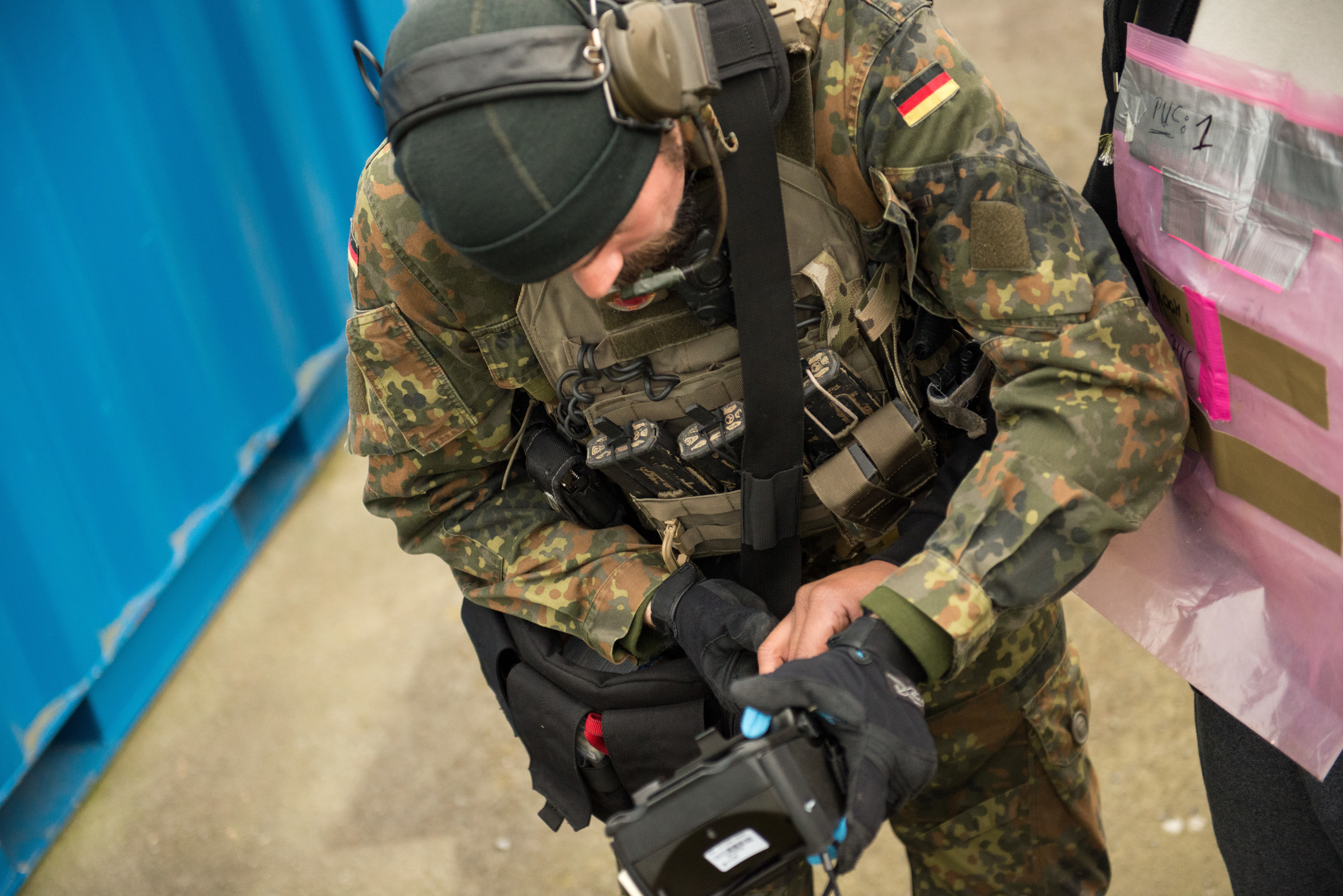
KSM frogman

In the Gulf War, German frogmen completed various operations that are classified by German Intelligence and such.

The naval commandos were also active from 1994 to 1996, during the NATO arms embargo against former Yugoslavia. The frogmen conducted boarding operations of suspicious freighters from German frigates and destroyers. Due to insufficient berthing capabilities on board the German warships, the boarding parties were usually undermanned. The commandos had to train ordinary crewmembers as auxiliaries in tasks such as keeping watch and taking control of the engine room and bridge of the boarded vessels.

== Organization ==
Coat of arms and "sawfish" activity badge of the Kampfschwimmer

Since 1974, the Kampfschwimmer have been stationed in the naval base at Eckernförde near Kiel. In October 1994 they were subordinate to the Flotilla of Mine Warfare. In Eckernförde a combat frogman group was set up, it consists of a mine clearance diver company and a commando frogmen company. Allegedly the weapon diver group has 250 men. The commando frogmen company had, according to strength and equipment records, 3 groups, each with 16 men. Of it, approximately 40 men are actively operational.

In 2001, the Waffentauchergruppe ("Weapons Diver Group") became the Bataillon Spezialisierter Kräfte ("Specialised Forces Battalion").

By a transformation in 2003, the de:Spezialisierte Einsatzkräfte Marine ("Specialised Task Forces of the Navy") was formed. The SEK M was divided further into the Combat Swimmer Company, a mine clearance diver company, and two naval companies for special employments (e.g. to board ships), a training inspection group, and further support elements.

The number of soldiers is expected to increase from 300 to 600 by 2025. Most of them are supposed to be support forces who provide logistical support to the operators.

== Conditions for entry ==
Success rate is approximately 30% which is up from the previous 5-10 percent over the three-year training period. These minimum requirements must be fulfilled by all candidates, to become certified for training:

- Applicants must be German citizens in the sense of the article 116 of the Grundgesetz (Constitution)
- They must be at least 17 years old and no more than 32 years old.
- Realschulabschluss or Abitur, with favorable exam passes.
- 1000m swim in less than 24 minutes
- 5000m run in less than 22 minutes
- 30m distance swim underwater without equipment
- Stay underwater without breathing for at least 60 seconds
- Sport test with at least 20 points; at least 3 points for each exercise
- Active duty soldier must be on the military career path to become a Feldwebel or officer. The civilian applicant must be ready to enlist for 12 years.
- Diving fitness is examined by the Schifffahrtsmedizinisches Institut (naval medical institute) of the navy.
- Parachute jump fitness is examined by the same institute.

== Training ==
During the training, it is less about the physical load than the psychological load, which causes many applicants to give up. The physical achievement can be trained, but overcoming the fear is the most important goal of the training. The training includes but is not limited to swimming, diving, navigation, close combat, weapons handling, and parachuting. In the special conclusion exercise their ability and hardness are equally demanded, before they join the circle of the commando frogmen. In further training sections they are trained as team leaders or specialists.

=== Introductory training ===
First there are four weeks of introductory training. In this time the applicants are pushed hard physically and psychologically by fixed exercises. All exercises have the goal to take away the fear of water and to make the applicant feel safe in the water. One of the exercises is called gefesseltes Schwimmen (the bound swimming). The applicant is placed on the starting block in the full combat suit, with his hands tied behind his back and his feet tied together, and then pushed in the swimming pool. He must stay for 30 seconds alone clearly; afterwards a safety diver pulls him back up.

In the so-called "hate week" the trainees are deprived of sleep. Between the night exercises, there are night runs. Meanwhile, the normal routine of the day continues: swimming, diving, and push-ups.

They also have to train to exit and enter a submarine through a torpedo tube. At the final examination they have to swim about 30 km with full equipment in the Baltic Sea to reach the beach after being discharged at the sea.

== Equipment ==
=== Weapons ===
Name	Type	Origin	Notes
Glock as(P9)	Semi-automatic pistol	(Austria)	G17
Heckler & Koch USP	Semi-automatic Pistol	(Germany)	
Heckler & Koch MP5K / MP5SD	SMG	(Germany)	May be fitted with various different optics.
Heckler & Koch MP7 A2	PDW	(Germany)	May be fitted with the Rheinmetall LLM Vario-Ray and various different optics.
Heckler & Koch G36K	Assault-rifle	(Germany)	May be fitted with the AG36 grenade launcher, the Rheinmetall LLM Vario-Ray and various different optics.
Heckler & Koch HK416 A7 (as G95K)	Assault-rifle	(Germany)	May be fitted with the HK GLM grenade launcher, the Rheinmetall Variable Tactical Aiming Laser (VTAL) and various different optics.
Heckler & Koch HK417 A2 (as G27)	Battle-rifle	(Germany)	May be fitted with the HK GLM grenade launcher, the Rheinmetall LLM Vario-Ray and various different optics.
Heckler & Koch G28	DMR	(Germany)	
Haenel RS9 (as G29)	Sniper-rifle	(Germany)	
Barrett M107A1 (as G82)	Sniper-rifle	(United States)	
Heckler & Koch MG4K	LMG	(Germany)	
Heckler & Koch MG5 A2	GPMG	(Germany)	
Remington 870 Express / MCS	Shotgun	(United States)	
Heckler & Koch GLM	Grenade-launcher	(Germany)	
Milkor AV-140 MSGL	Revolver Grenade-launcher	(United States)	
Heckler & Koch GMG	AGL	(Germany)	
DND RGW 60/90	MANPAT	(Germany)	
Stinger FIM-92J	MANPADS	(United States)	
Rafael Spike-MR	ATGM	(Israel)	
Pohl Force knife	Combat-knife	(Germany)	Various models.

Eickhorn S.E.K. Marine knife (designed specifically for this unit)

Eickhorn knives, Various models

=== Vehicles ===
Name	Type	Origin	Notes
MOWAG Eagle V	Armored Patrol-vehicle	(Switzerland)	
KTM 640 LS-E Military	Multi-purpose Enduro	(Austria)	
Wayland MkI 450 Commando	Folding-kayak	(Poland)	

=== Special equipment ===
Name	Type	Origin	Notes
Airborne-Systems MMS	Tactical-parachute	(United Kingdom)	HAHO/HALO capable.
Airborne-Systems SOLR Mask	HAHO/HALO Oxygen-mask	(United Kingdom)	
Airborne-Systems SOLR 4500	HAHO/HALO Oxygen-tank	(United Kingdom)	

=== Gear ===
- 3M (United States)
  - Peltor Comtac XPI Dual Com NATO
- Arc'teryx (Canada)
  - Fire-resistant Combat-clothing
  - All-weather clothing
  - Bagpacks
- ArmorSource (United States)
  - AS-600 helmet (rifle-resistant)
- Carinthia (Austria)
  - Military sleeping-bags
- Crye Precision (United States)
  - Fire-resistant Combat-clothing
  - Plate-carriers
  - Kinetic support-systems
  - Bagpacks
  - Pouches
  - Belts
- Dräger (Germany)
  - Rebreather (combat-diving)
- FirstSpear (United States)
  - Plate-carriers (Combat-diving)
  - Flotation-systems
  - Bagpacks
  - Pouches
  - Belts
- Harris (United States)
  - Falcon III RF-7850M-HH
  - Combat-electronics
- Heinrichs Weikamp (Germany)
  - OSTC 4
  - Diving-electronics
- JFD (Scotland)
  - Divex Stealth CDLSE
  - Divex Dual Mode Mask
  - Divex Low Magnetic Fins
- L3-Insight (United States)
  - GPNVG-18
  - AN/PSQ-36 FGS
- Leo Köhler (Germany)
  - Fire-resistant Combat-clothing
  - All-weather clothing
  - Plate-carriers
  - Bagpacks
- MATBOCK (United States)
  - Parachuting-gear
  - Bagpacks
  - Medic-gear
- Meindl (Germany)
  - All-weather Combat-boots
- MEN (Germany)
  - Ammunition
- Nivisys (United States)
  - DVS-110
- Rheinmetall (Germany)
  - Ammunition
  - Combat-electronics
- SeaBear (Austria)
  - HUDC
  - Diving-electronics
- TEA (United States)
  - H2O U94 PTT
  - Sub Assault
  - OSK Maritime Kit
- Team Wendy (United States)
  - Retention-Kits
  - Liner-Kits
  - ARC-Rails
- UF PRO (Slovenia)
  - Fire-resistant Combat-clothing
  - All-weather clothing
- Ursuit (Finland)
  - Combat-diving dry-suits
  - Combat-diving gear
- W+R PRO (Germany)
  - Combat-gloves

== See also ==
- (Germany) Kommando Spezialkräfte – German special forces command
- (United Kingdom) Special Boat Service – Special forces unit of the Royal Navy
- United States Navy SEALs – U.S. Navy's special operations force
