= Aimpoint =

Optics company in Sweden

Aimpoint AB
- Type: Private (AB)
- Industry: Manufacturing
- Founded: 1974; 52 years ago
- Headquarters: Malmö, Sweden
- Products: Electro-optical sights and accessories
- Website: www.aimpoint.com

Aimpoint AB is a Swedish optics company based in Malmö, Sweden that manufactures red dot sights.

Aimpoint is a contractor for the United States military and supplies the Aimpoint CompM4. Aimpoint products are used by various armed forces, and are marketed to civilians for hunting and sport. The Aimpoint Comp sights, such as the CompM2, are Aimpoint's most popular product line.

== Company ==
Aimpoint is a manufacturing company founded in 1974. Their primary products are reflector (or reflex) sights, specifically the red dot sight sub-type. In 1975 they introduced their first product, the "Aimpoint Electronic" red dot sight, based on a design by Helsingborg engineer John Arne Ingemund Ekstrand. This is the first light emitting diode (LED) "red dot" reflector sight manufactured. Aimpoint currently offers various products based on this technology. In 1997 the US Army awarded Aimpoint the first military contract for a red dot sight, the Aimpoint CompM2, designated the “M68 Close Combat Optic”.

== Products ==
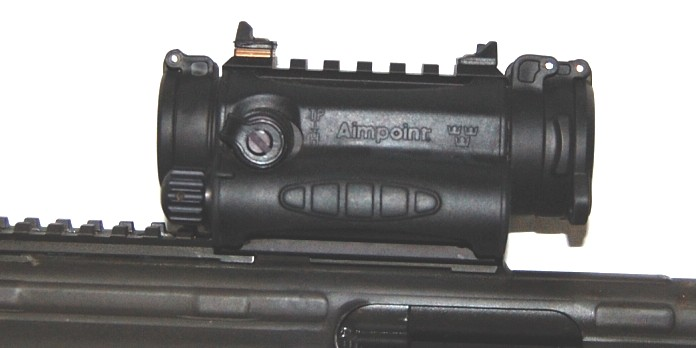
Aimpoint on an AK4

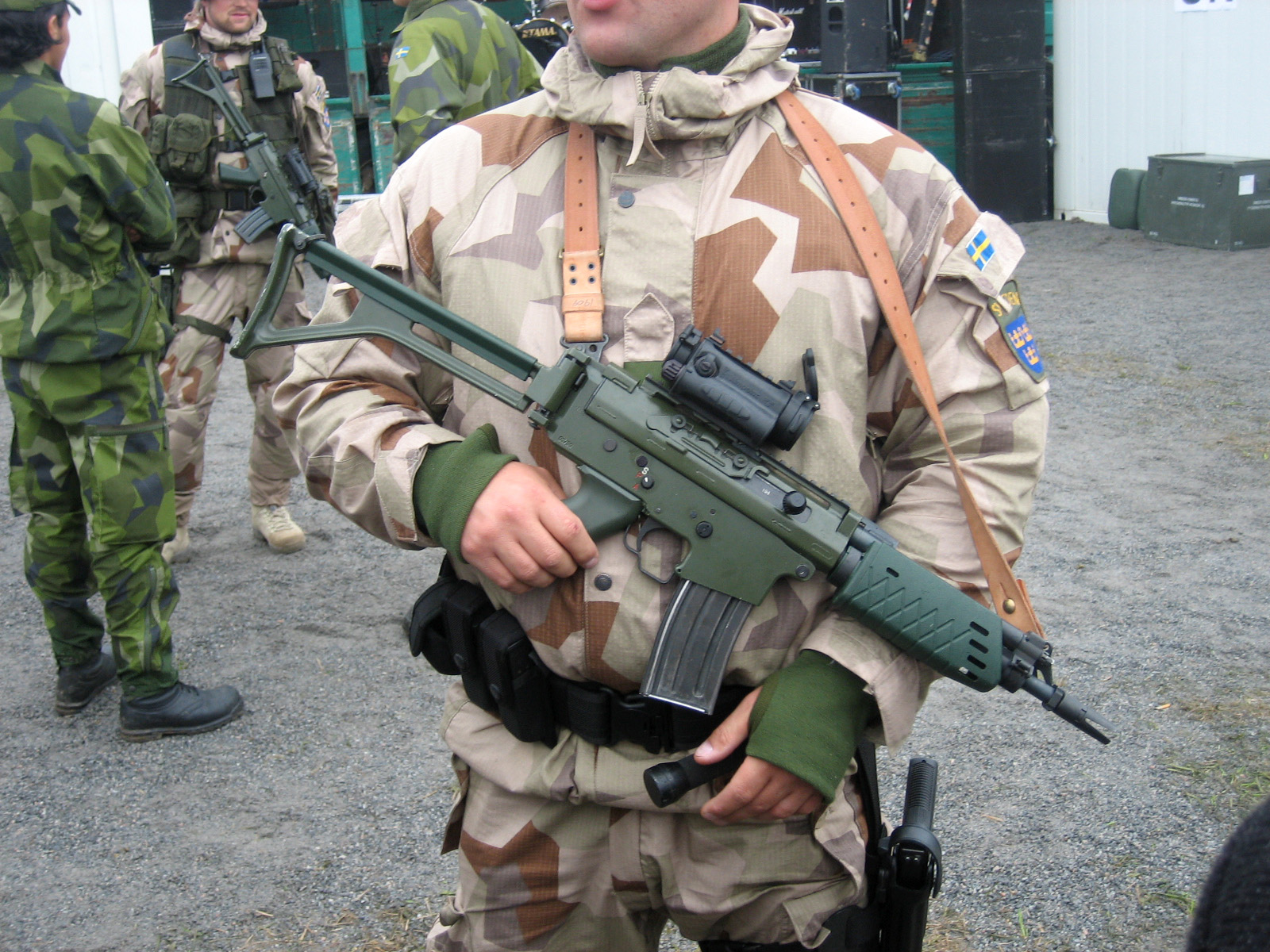
Ak 5D seen here with an Aimpoint red dot sight.

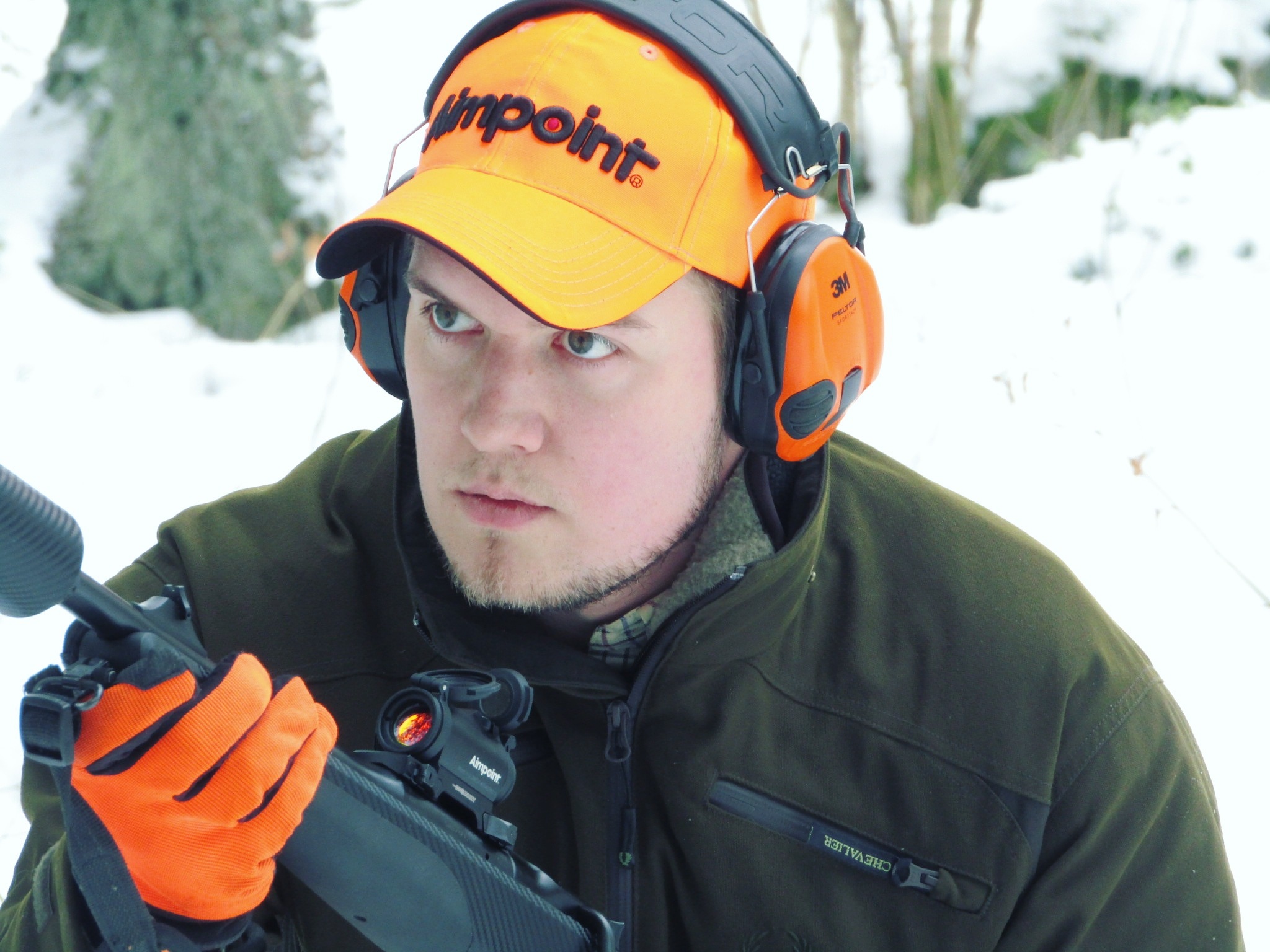
Hunter with Aimpoint Micro H-2 on rifle

Aimpoint's red dot sights are marketed to hunters, marksmen, law-enforcement agencies, and military organizations. Nearly 3,000,000 sights are in use worldwide today.

Their products use non-magnifying optical collimators (reflector or "reflex" sights) and battery powered LEDs to produce an illuminated red dot reticle. Many sights utilize a mangin mirror system, consisting of a meniscus lens corrector element combined with a semi-reflective mirror (referred to as a "two lens" or "double lens" system by Aimpoint), that compensates for spherical aberration, an error that can cause the dot position to diverge from the sight's optical axis with change in eye position. Aimpoint markets their sights as "parallax free", but this seems to refer to their off-axis spherical aberration correction system at one optimized viewing distance. Aimpoints, like all collimated sight systems, induce some parallax at non-optimized viewing distances.

Aimpoint has separate distributors for their military and civilian products in many countries.

=== Aimpoint mounting standards ===
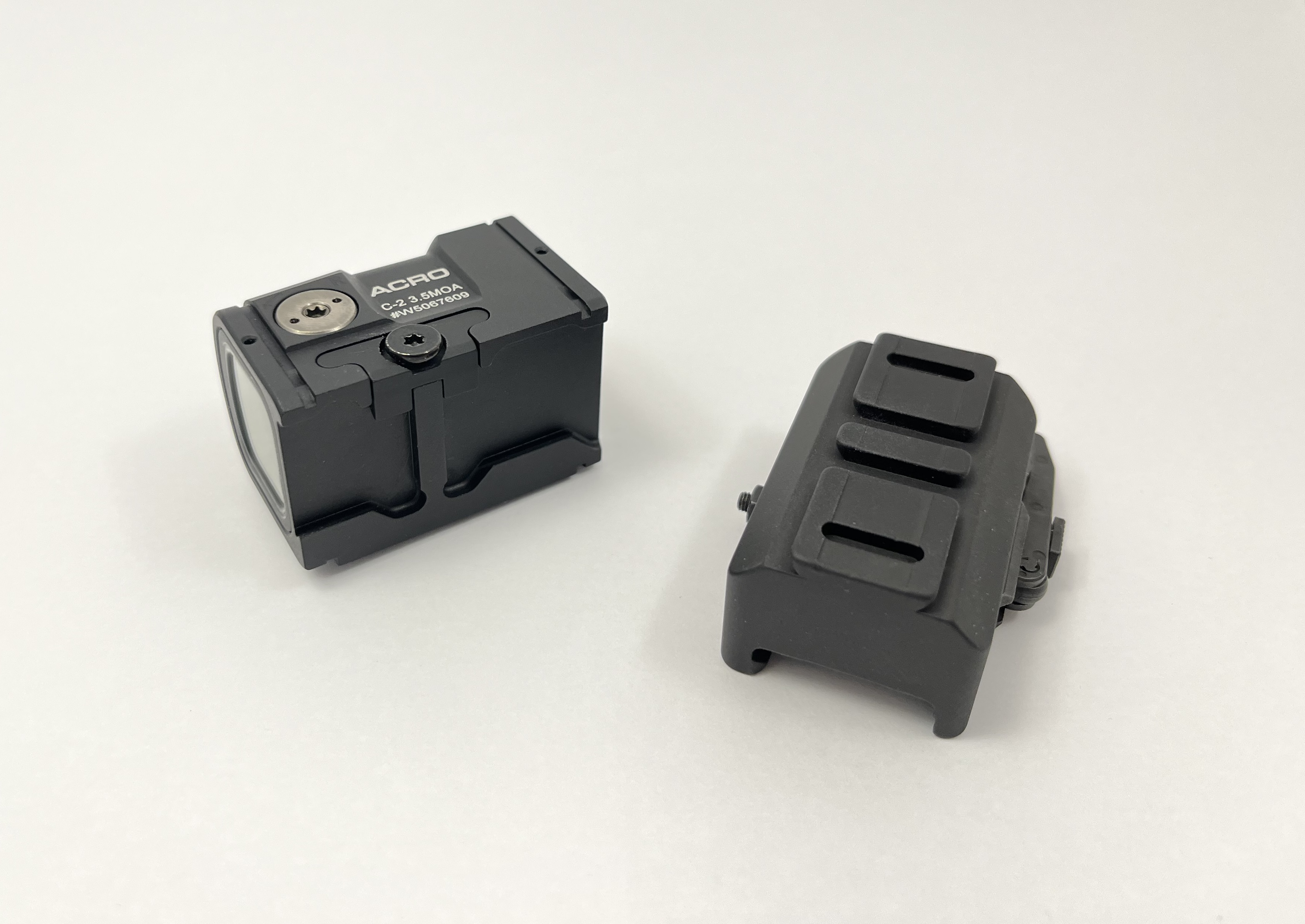
Left: Aimpoint Acro C2 reflex sight laying on its side. Right: Acro rail on a Picatinny riser.

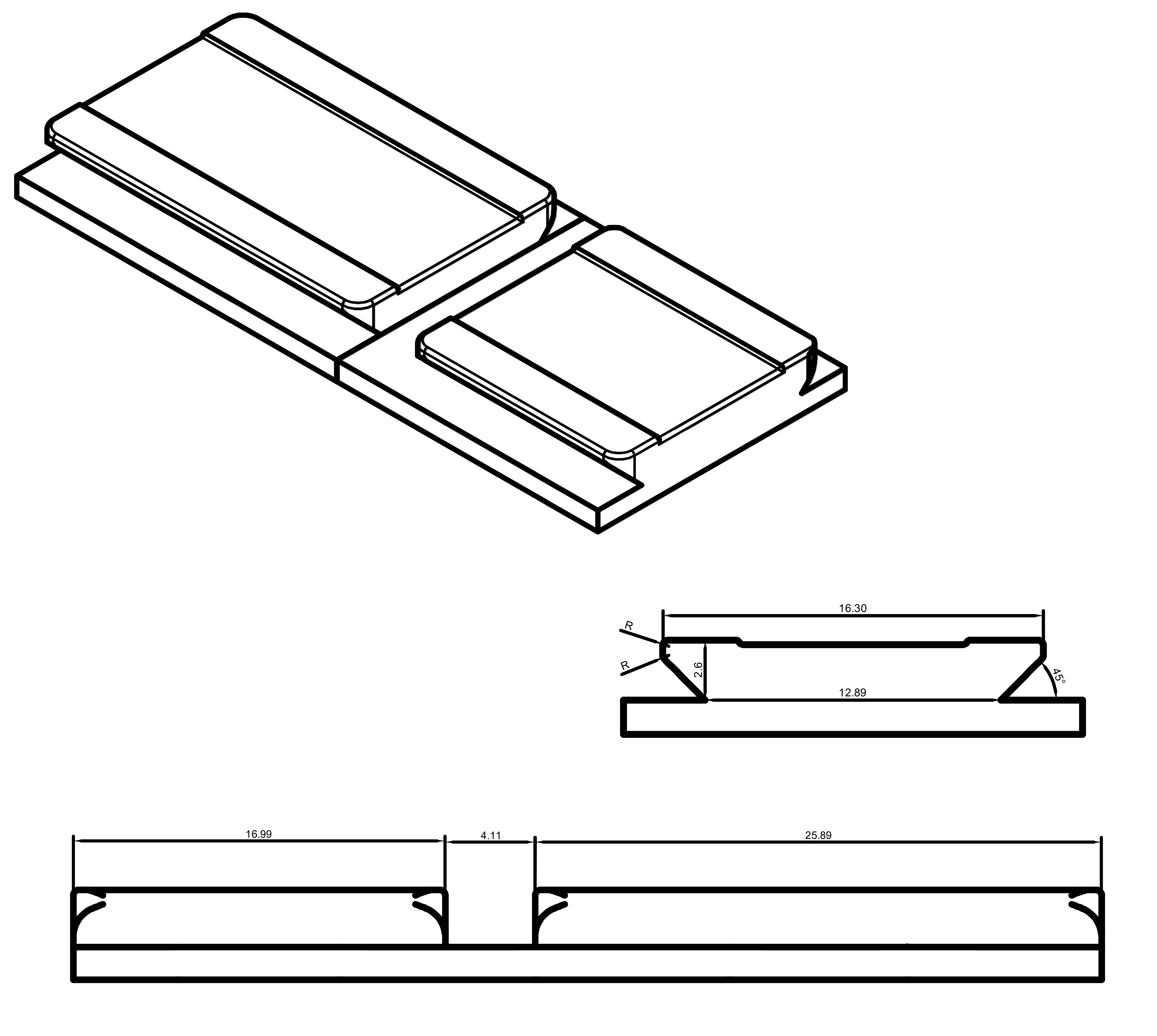
Approximate dimensions of an Aimpoint Acro dovetail rail.

Aimpoint has launched a series of proprietary mounts for their products. These include:

- Aimpoint CompM4 mount: Launched in 2007 with the Aimpoint CompM4 sight. The sight is attached to the mount via two M5 screws from the underside, and the mount has a transverse groove acting as a recoil lug. The Aimpoint Comp line was launched in 1993. The predecessor of the CompM4, CompM2, had a 30 mm ring mount and was introduced in the American military in 2000. Some manufacturers have copied the M4 mount system, but it has mainly been used by Aimpoint.
- Aimpoint Micro mount: Launched in 2007 together with the compact Aimpoint Micro series of sights (T1 and H1, and later T2 and H2). The sight is attached to the mount with four M3 screw. The mount has a longitudinal profile which is reminiscent of the Zeiss rail, but with other dimensions and a square recoil lug in the middle. The profile is also longitudinally slightly offset from the centerline. The standard has been copied by many other manufacturers, and has been a common mounting standard for reflex sights in sizes similar to the Aimpoint Micro (such as Holosun 403B, Minox RV1, SIG Sauer Romeo4, Vortex Crossfire and Aimpoint Comp M5b). In addition to being offered as the mounting surface on sights from many other optics manufacturers, there are also many aftermarket mounts available for this pattern.
- Aimpoint Acro rail: Launched in 2019 together with the sights Aimpoint Acro P-1 and C-1. This is a mount without screws acting directly between the sight and the mount, and is slim enough (approximately 15 mm wide and 2 mm tall) so that it can be milled directly into most pistol slides. The mount is a dovetail rail with a thick transverse recoil lug (4 mm) and is reminiscent of a miniaturized version of the Picatinny rail, but with a lower and slimmer profile, and fewer edges exposed to the user. With competing standards for attaching miniature red dot sights to pistols (such as the Docter, Trijicon, C-more and Shield/Leupold mounting standards), experience among competition shooters has shown that the screws used for attaching the sight directly to the mount can wear due to inadvertently taking up recoil, including both normal recoil from firing as well as negative recoil from when the slide closes during feeding, resulting in the screws wearing and needing to be replaced over time. The Acro mount does not use such screws, but instead has a clamp mount. Due to using a clamp mount (similar to the Picatinny), no screws are needed to attach the sight to the mount rail. The Acro rail has so far been used on Aimpoint Acro (P1, C1, P2, C2) and Steiner MPS.

== See also ==
- EOTech
- Trijicon
- ELCAN
- ITL MARS
