= M68 =

M68 or M-68 may refer to:

Roads

- M-68 (Michigan highway), a state highway in Michigan
- M68 (Johannesburg), a short metropolitan route in Johannesburg, South Africa
- Proposed road numbering for a section of the road built as the M66 motorway in the United Kingdom, now part of the M60

Other uses

- M68 (Motorola 68000), a CISC microprocessor
- Miles M.68, a 4 engined development of Miles Aerovan
- Soltam M-68, a 1968 155 mm 33 calibre towed howitzer manufactured in Israel
- Messier 68, a globular cluster in the constellation Hydra
- M68 Close Combat Optic, referring to the Aimpoint CompM2 or its later version the Aimpoint CompM4
- M68 (tank gun)
- iPhone (1st generation), Apple's first mobile device, which was originally codenamed as "M68"

.
