= Aimpoint CompM4 =

Red dot gun sight used by the U.S. Armed Forces

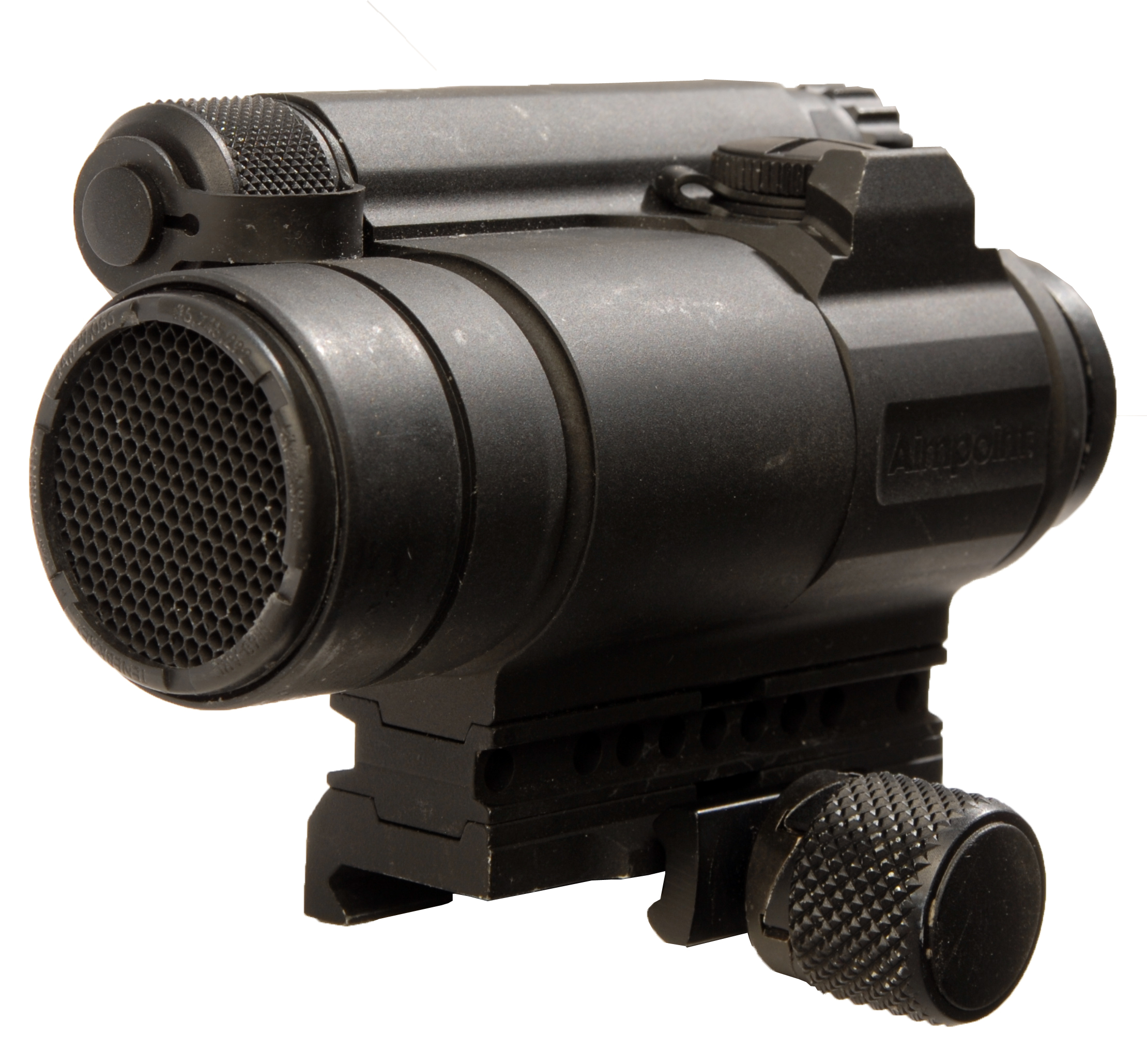
The U.S. Army's newest version of the M68 Close Combat Optic (CCO) is the Aimpoint CompM4.

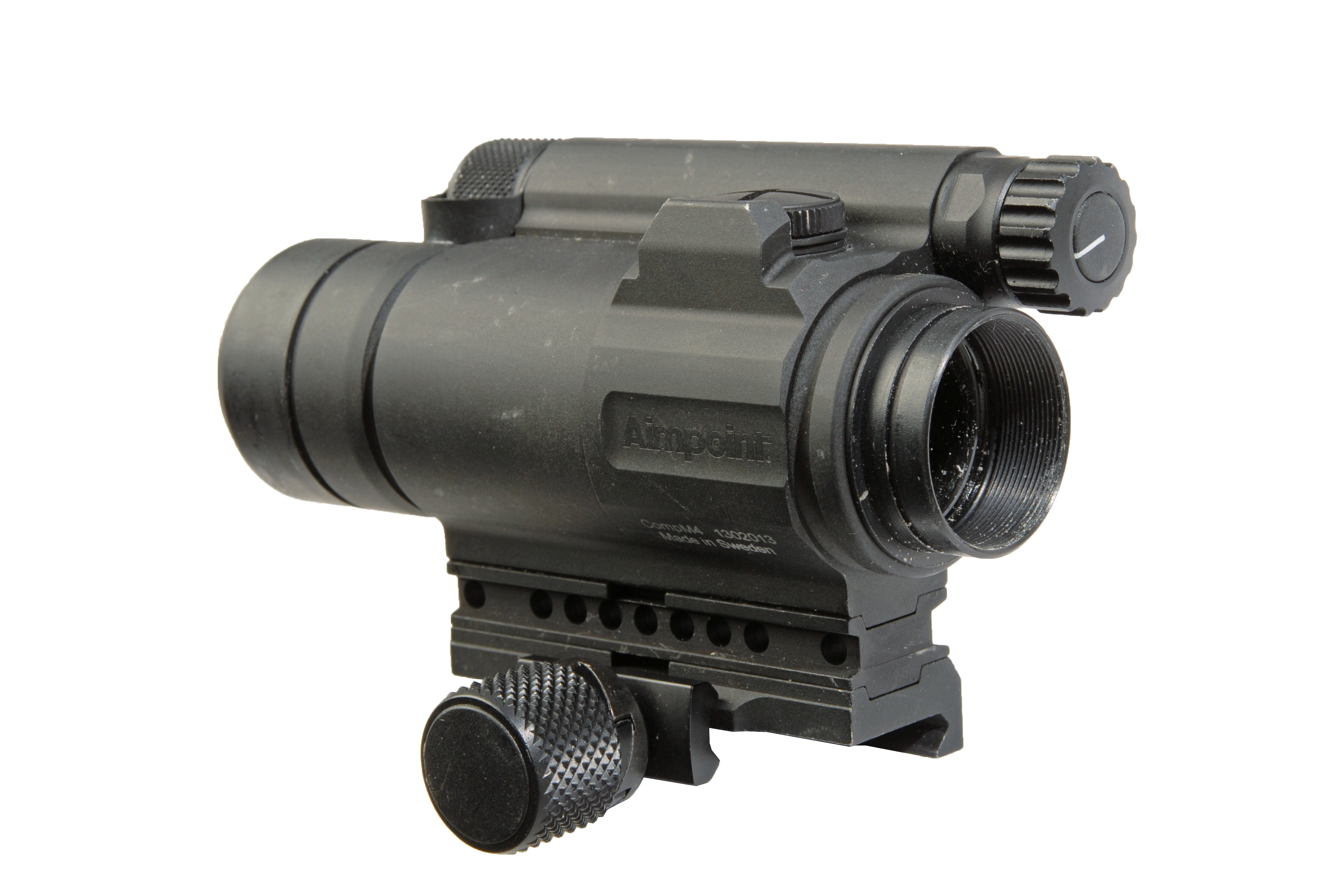
The shooter's end of the CompM4 with the power control knob

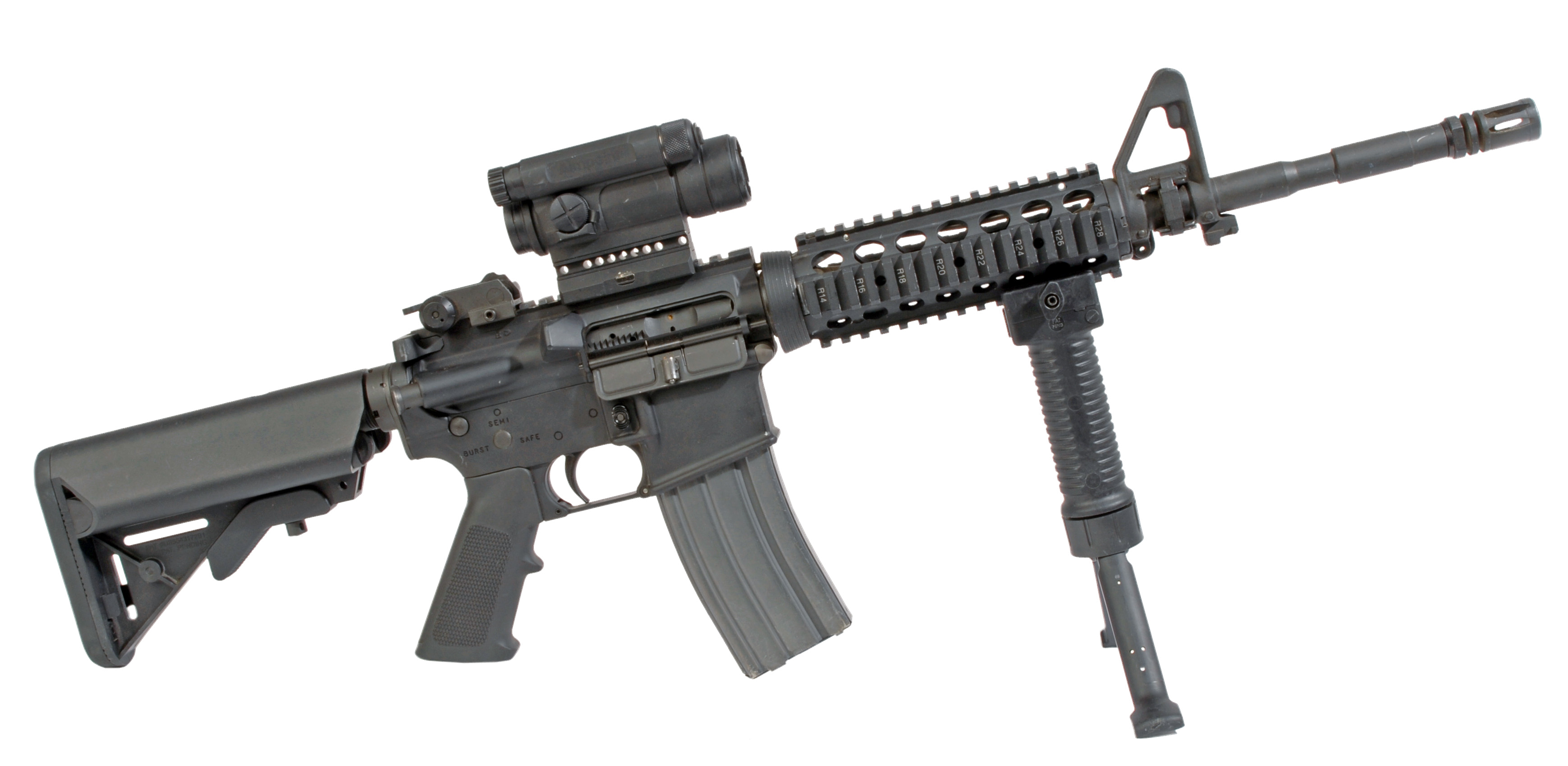
An M4 carbine with a Picatinny rail system on the upper receiver and four-sided handguard, showing a GPS-02 "Grip Pod", a type of vertical grip that has a deployable bipod inside the handle and an M68 CCO optical sight

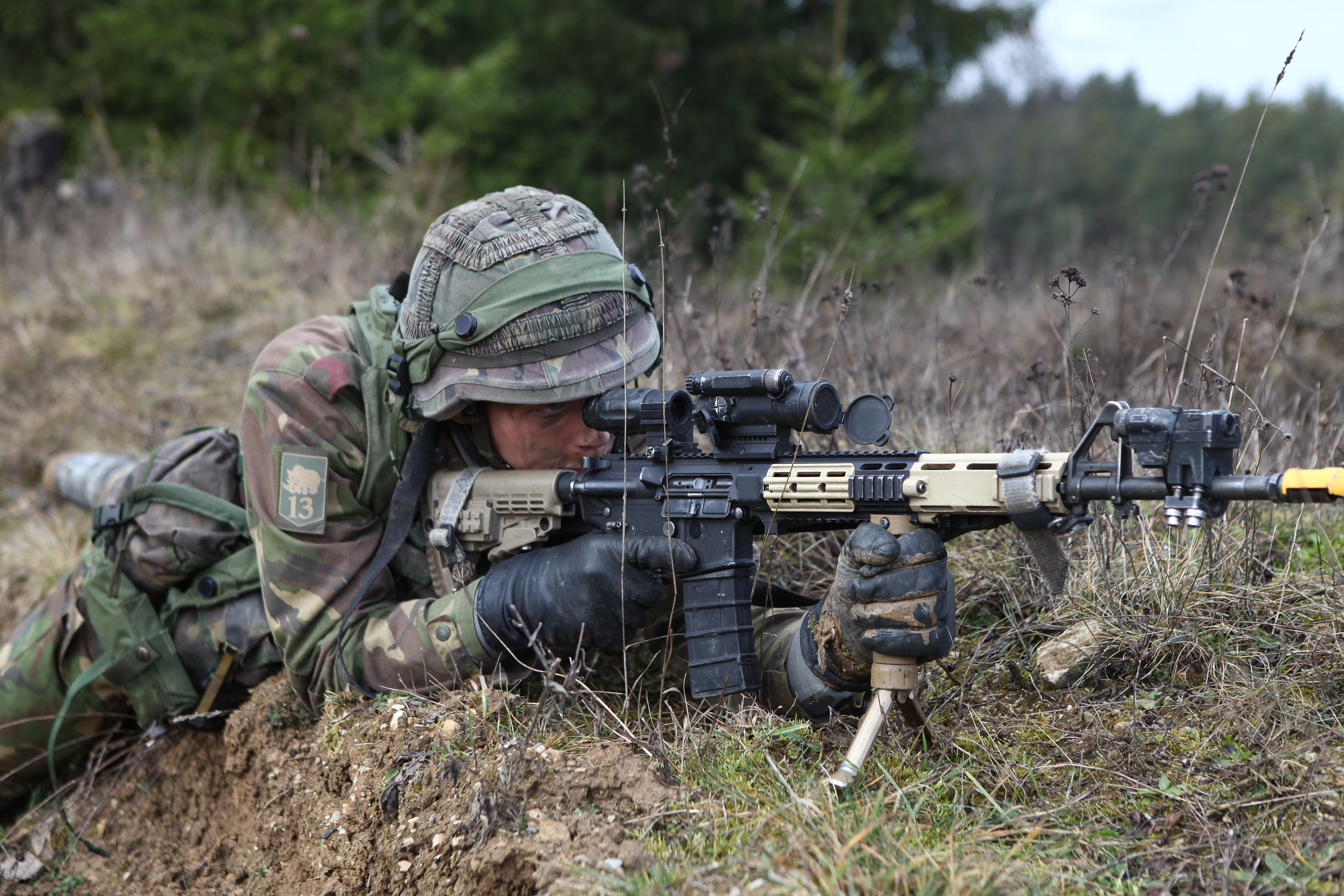
C7NLD assault rifle with Aimpoint CompM4 and accompanying Aimpoint 3XMag-1 magnifier at its rear

The Aimpoint CompM4 is a non-magnified red dot style gun sight adopted by the U.S. Armed Forces, designated the M68 CCO (Close Combat Optic). It is produced by the Swedish company Aimpoint and is the successor to the earlier M68CCO, the Aimpoint CompM2.

== Overview ==
The Aimpoint CompM4 is a "tubed" style reflector (reflex) sight that uses a red light-emitting diode (LED) at the focus of a mirror type optical collimator to produce an aligned red aiming spot (what is commonly called a red dot sight). There are a total of 16 brightness settings for the LED, the lower 7 intended for use with night vision devices and the upper 9 for daylight. The CompM4 is powered by a standard AA battery, and the manufacturer claims that the sight will run continuously for 8 years on a single battery, in its 10th brightness setting.

Reflector sights have unlimited eye relief, meaning that the user may place his eye at any distance from the sight and the reticle will remain visible. This allows flexibility in mounting and shooting position. The CompM4 uses Aimpoint's "parallax-free" optical correction system, meaning there is minimal induced optical error that would shift the point of aim relative to the sight's optical axis as the user's eye moves off-center in relation to the sight. The sight itself is parallax-free at around 50 yards, meaning that the red dot will not change position relative to the target based on eye position at that range. As in other reflex sights, the point of aim will change position based on eye position at other ranges with the maximum error being equal to the diameter of the sight's optical window at short range. There are currently two variants available; the standard CompM4 and the CompM4S, the latter being the same in terms of features and functionality, but having the battery compartment & power control knob mounted near the bottom of the sight instead of near the top.

In 2009, the US Army selected the CompM4s to fulfill the M68 CCO program requirements and ordered 565,783 of the sights. This was followed by another order in 2017 for an additional 30,000 sights.

=== Dimensions ===
- Length: 120 mm (4.7 in)
- Width (sight only): 53 mm (2.1 in)
- Height (sight only): 60 mm (2.4 in)
- Width (including mount): 72 mm (2.8 in)
- Height (including mount): 72 mm (2.8 in)
- Mounting ring width: none (does not require mounting ring)
- Weight (sight only): 265 g (9.3 oz)
- Weight (including mount): 335 g (11.8 oz)

== Users ==
- Afghanistan: Used by Afghan Commandos on M4 carbine
- Armenia: Used by Armenian Special Units.
- Belgium : Used by most Belgian Defence soldiers equipped with FN SCAR.
- Chile
- Czech Republic : Used by Czech Armed Forces soldiers equipped with CZ 805 BREN.
- Greece: Used by Hellenic Army SF.
- Netherlands: Used by the Armed forces of the Netherlands on the C7NLD, C8NLD, LOAWNLD, FN Minimi and the HK416.
- Lebanon
- Norway
- Portugal: Used by Portuguese Army, Portuguese Marine Corps and Guarda Nacional Republicana.
- United States
- Turkey: Used by Gendarmerie Special Operations
- Vietnam: Used by Vietnam People's Army
