= Ukraine Aid Operations =

International volunteer charity providing aid to Ukraine since 2022

- United Aid and Logistics Foundation
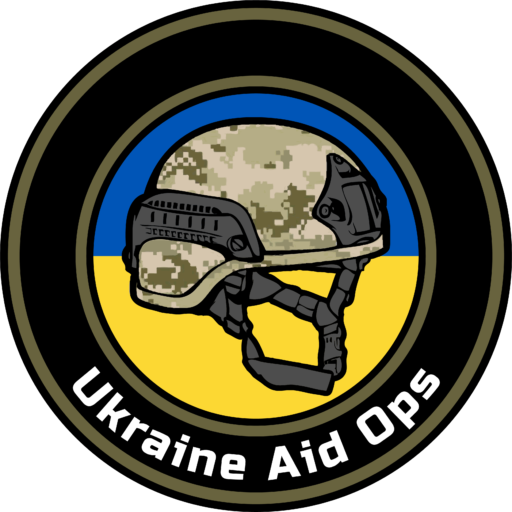
- Abbreviation: UAO
- Formation: April 2022; 4 years ago
- Type: 501(c)(3) non-profit organization
- Tax ID no.: 88-2498776
- Legal status: Public charity
- Purpose: Procurement and delivery of protective equipment, medical supplies and other non-lethal aid to the Armed Forces of Ukraine
- Headquarters: Dover, Delaware, United States
- Location: United States, Ukraine, United Kingdom
- Services: Procurement, logistics and last-mile delivery of equipment to Ukrainian frontline units
- Website: ukraineaidops.org

Ukraine Aid Operations (UAO), legally registered in the United States as the United Aid and Logistics Foundation, is an international volunteer-run charity that procures and delivers protective equipment, medical supplies, vehicles and other non-lethal aid to the Armed Forces of Ukraine. Founded in April 2022 in response to the full-scale Russian invasion of Ukraine, the organisation is registered as a charity in Ukraine, the United Kingdom and the United States; in the United States it operates as a 501(c)(3) organization under the legal name United Aid and Logistics Foundation (EIN 88-2498776).

== History ==
Ukraine Aid Operations was founded in April 2022, several weeks after the start of the full-scale Russian invasion of Ukraine in February 2022. According to the organisation, it began as a small private fundraising effort by an international group of volunteers responding to messages from the front line that requested protective gear, medical equipment and other items not covered by foreign government deliveries. It was subsequently incorporated as a non-profit and developed into a registered charity, with volunteers based in more than ten countries.

In an interview with the Ukrainian public broadcaster Suspilne, the project's Ukrainian-side coordinator Yuri Tkachenko – a Kyiv-based volunteer active in support of the Ukrainian Armed Forces since 2014 – recalled that the fund was created in 2022 after he was approached by volunteers from the United Kingdom, Estonia and the United States who proposed setting up a joint procurement-and-delivery initiative.

The U.S. parent entity, the United Aid and Logistics Foundation, was incorporated in the state of Delaware (file number 6800424) and granted 501(c)(3) public-charity status by the Internal Revenue Service in July 2022.

== Activities ==
Ukraine Aid Operations describes itself as a "supplier-to-frontline" charity, meaning that it manages its own supply chain end-to-end – from the procurement of equipment to its hand-over to specific units in Ukraine – in order to minimise the risk of items being misallocated. Equipment delivered by UAO has included:

- protective gear such as helmets, body-armour plates, ballistic glasses and ear protection;
- medical supplies, including individual first-aid kits and tourniquets;
- technical equipment such as reconnaissance drones (notably DJI Mavic 3T multirotors), unmanned ground vehicles, secure radios, range-finders and signal jammers;
- clothing such as winter uniforms, thermal underwear and gloves;
- vehicles, including pickup trucks and ambulances.

The organisation distributes equipment to a wide variety of Ukrainian units, including territorial-defence formations, regular brigades of the Armed Forces, the National Guard of Ukraine, paramedic groups and international volunteers fighting alongside Ukrainian forces. Yuri Tkachenko told Suspilne that, as a matter of policy, equipment is handed over only at the front and not at locations away from active combat, "to ensure it is used where it is needed".

=== Civilian aid after the Kakhovka Dam collapse ===
Following the Destruction of the Kakhovka Dam in June 2023, Ukraine Aid Operations broadened its purchasing to include water-filtration units, water purification tablets, hydration kits and inflatable dinghies for use by units carrying out civilian evacuations and supply runs in flooded areas of southern Ukraine.

=== Drone and counter-drone programmes ===
From 2024 onward, Ukraine Aid Operations expanded both its reconnaissance-drone deliveries and its counter-drone activities. Dedicated fundraising campaigns financed multi-frequency drone jammers, anti-drone shotgun sights and protective nets for vehicles and dugouts on active sectors of the front, including the Pokrovsk, Toretsk and Kharkiv axes.

In November 2025 Ukraine's Defence Intelligence (HUR) reported the delivery of a €350,000 aid package from an anonymous Dutch donor that included more than 700 Hatsan and Mavka MKA1919 pump-action shotguns – used to engage low-flying FPV and reconnaissance drones – together with 130 Holosun red-dot sights and 20,000 rounds of ammunition. The shipment was distributed to six HUR special-operations units (Artan, Arey, Kraken, Shamanbat, the International Legion, and the Viking Maritime Operations Center). According to the news agency Ukrinform and the defence-news outlet Militarnyi, the transfer was facilitated by Ukraine Aid Operations together with a partner charity. The Frisian regional outlet Brekt reported that volunteer director Sytske de Boer co-ordinated the delivery of these and other anti-drone shotguns inside Ukraine alongside her Ukrainian counterpart Yuri Tkachenko.

In a March 2025 interview with the Dutch armed-forces trade union AFMP, de Boer said that, because fibre-optic-guided FPV drones cannot be defeated by radio-frequency jammers, UAO had increasingly shifted procurement towards anti-thermal suits, which reduce a soldier's thermal signature at night, in addition to its existing programmes for jammers, generators and night-vision equipment.

The organisation has also cooperated on drone-related fundraising with the U.S.-based YouTube channel Combat Veteran Reacts and, in 2026, with the Dutch Diel Foundation, which co-financed a campaign to procure 100 unmanned ground vehicles for evacuation and logistics.

=== Support during the Kursk offensive ===
After Ukrainian forces launched the Kursk offensive into Russia's Kursk Oblast in August 2024, UAO's Ukrainian operations director Yuri Tkachenko told Suspilne that the project had raised approximately US$500,000 within weeks for units fighting on Russian territory, including some US$300,000 received from American donors in a single week. He added that aid had also been provided to the 82nd Air-Assault Brigade, which had previously been re-equipped by UAO during the defence of Vovchansk.

=== Victory Gallery ===
Ukraine Aid Operations operates the Victory Gallery, a project that commissions Ukrainian artists to transform spent ammunition, shell casings, fragments of destroyed Russian armoured vehicles and parts of downed aircraft into works of art. Proceeds from the sale of the works fund further deliveries of equipment to Ukrainian forces. BORGEN Magazine reported that, by April 2024, the project had raised approximately US$680,000, which had been used to fund additional helmets and body armour. In 2023 the project staged an exhibition in Kyiv which was covered by Ukrainian television.

== Reception and partnerships ==
Ukraine Aid Operations has received support from several international musicians and content creators. In 2024 the Dutch symphonic-metal band Within Temptation sold a limited edition of their album Bleed Out that included thirty embroidered patches priced at €200 each, with proceeds used to fund UAO purchases of helmets, night-vision equipment and similar items for Ukrainian units. In an interview with the Italian channel Hop'n Music that was reported by the German edition of Metal Hammer, singer Sharon den Adel said the band wanted "to keep supporting Ukraine" and described the charity's Victory Gallery as making "something beautiful out of something really ugly".

The organisation has also collaborated repeatedly with the U.S.-based YouTube channel Combat Veteran Reacts on joint fundraisers for protective equipment and counter-drone gear.

== Organisation and funding ==
Ukraine Aid Operations is run by an unpaid volunteer team. Speaking to BORGEN Magazine, volunteer director Sytske de Boer said that the charity drew volunteers from at least ten countries simultaneously, with team members based in Estonia, Germany, the United States, Portugal, Japan, Lithuania, the United Kingdom, South Africa, Italy, the Netherlands and Belgium. The organisation states that, on average, more than 91 per cent of donations are spent directly on equipment for Ukrainian units, with the remainder covering logistics, warehouse rental and transaction fees. Activities are documented in a public news archive on the charity's website.

Funding is raised principally through online donations, recurring-giving programmes, the sale of art produced by the Victory Gallery project, and dedicated campaigns hosted on platforms such as Donorbox.

=== Finances ===
According to the Internal Revenue Service Form 990 filings indexed by the ProPublica Nonprofit Explorer, the United Aid and Logistics Foundation reported revenue of US$1.85 million and expenses of US$1.89 million for the fiscal year ended April 2024, and revenue of US$3.02 million and expenses of US$2.91 million for the fiscal year ended April 2025. In both years 100 per cent of revenue came from contributions, and the foundation reported zero spending on executive compensation, salaries and professional fundraising fees, consistent with its all-volunteer operating model.

== See also ==
- Come Back Alive
- Nova Ukraine
