= Predicted impact point =

The predicted impact point (PIP) is the location that a ballistic projectile (e.g. bomb, missile, bullet) is expected to strike if fired. The PIP is almost always actively determined by a targeting computer, which then projects a PIP marker (a "pipper") onto a head-up display (HUD). Modern HUDs are focused so the weapon operator will see the marker projected directly over the point of impact, regardless of the position of the shooter's eye position.

Modern combat aircraft are equipped to calculate the PIP for onboard weapons at any given time. Using the PIP marker, pilots can achieve good accuracy at ranges of up to several kilometers, whether the target is ground-based or airborne. Variables included in the calculation are aircraft velocity, target velocity, target elevation, distance to target, forces on the projectile (drag, gravity), and others.

Another example of devices that show the PIP are red dot sights like the M68 Aimpoint. Such sights, like those on an HUD, are collimated reflector sights, so the dot always appears over the weapon's impact point, regardless of the shooter's eye position. Red dot sights do not use internal computers and must be manually zeroed for maximum accuracy.

Impact Point Prediction (IPP) refers to the method by which the impact point is evaluated.

Impact Point Prediction Methods include one or more of the following seven categories which are ordered with decreasing complexity in the perspective of the model and the necessary initial states and parameters:

• Six-Degrees-of-Freedom rigid body (6DoF)

• Modified-Linear Theory (MLT)

• Modified Point Mass (MPM)

• Full Point Mass (FPM)

• Simple Point Mass (SPM)

• Hybrid Point Mass (HPM)

• Vacuum Point Mass (VPM)

Guidance methods for ballistic missiles are used to compensate for the difficulty in pre-launch prediction, which originates from uncertainties in maneuvering. In these, machine learning techniques like neural networks can be used to update the predicted impact point based on the current flight state in a reasonable amount of time and computational resources.

== See also ==
- Fire-control system
