= Collimator sight =

Type of optical sight

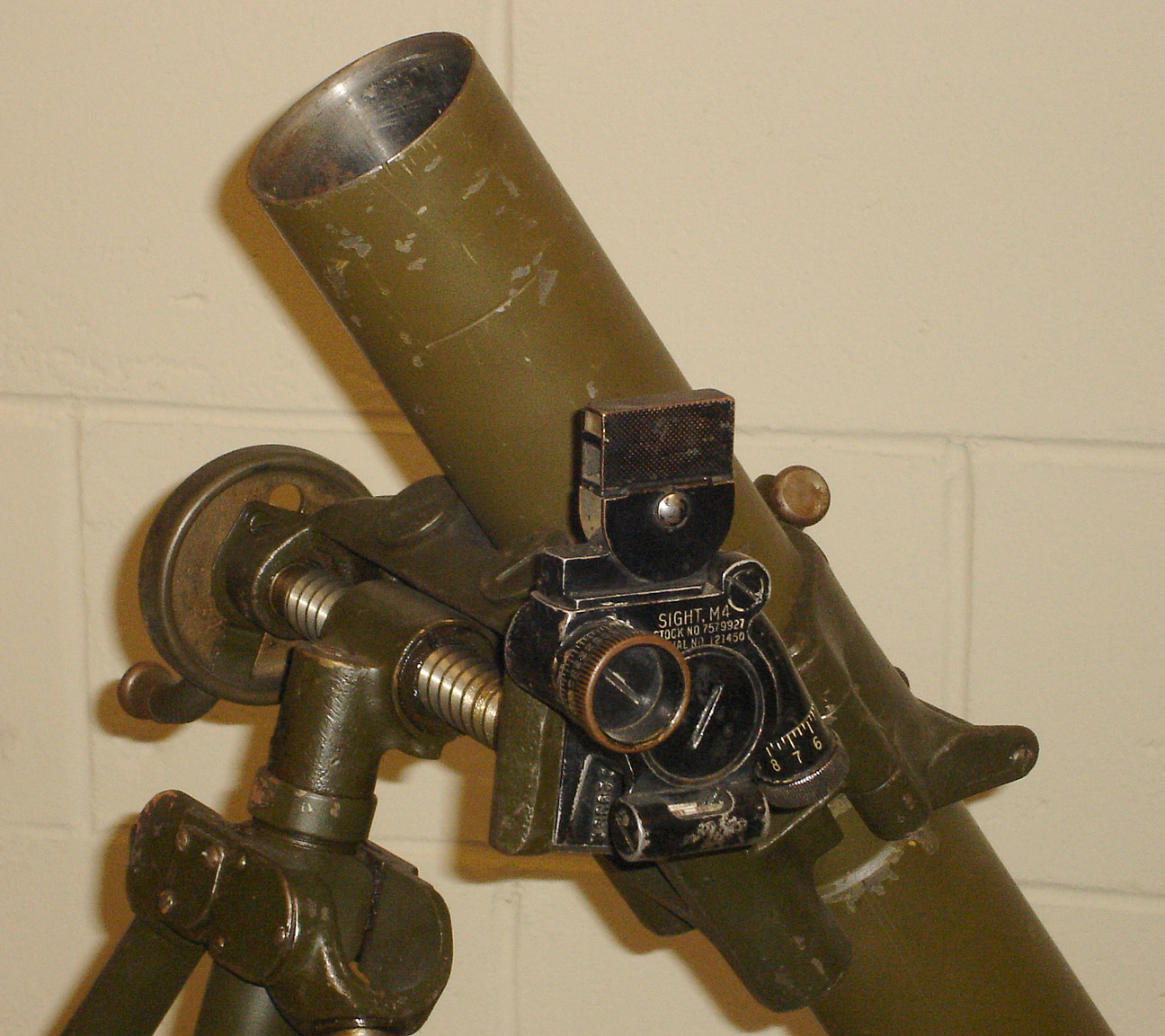
M4 collimator sight on a M4 mortar

A collimator sight is a type of optical sight that allows the user looking into it to see an illuminated aiming point aligned with the device the sight is attached to, regardless of eye position (with little parallax). They are also referred to as collimating sights or "occluded eye gunsight" (OEG).

== Description ==
Layout of an optical collimator with a bulb

The basic layout of a collimator sight is a closed tube with a lens at its open end and a illuminated reticle mounted near the closed end at the focus of the lens, creating an optical collimator. The reticle is illuminated by an electronic light source (an incandescent light bulb or, more recently, a light-emitting diode) or by ambient light gathered behind the reticle via an opalescent window or fiber optic light pipe. Collimator sights are a relatively old idea, being used in many forms for almost 100 years.

=== Usage ===
Collimator sights, also known as occluded eye gunsights (OEGs), are designed for use with both eyes open. The user aligns one eye with the sight while the other eye remains open and focused on the target. This allows the brain to superimpose the aiming reticle onto the target, creating a composite image. Alternatively, the user can adjust their head position to switch between viewing the sight and the target with the same eye or use a partial alignment to see both the sight and the target simultaneously.

== Applications ==
Collimator sights as weapon sights are considered to be very simple, rugged and low cost devices. They have been used on mortars and field guns since World War I. There have had more modern incarnations such as the Armson Occluded Eye Gunsight (OEG) and the Normark Corp. Singlepoint. These both used a light gathering rod in a protective clear dome collecting ambient light to illuminate a 'dot' style reticle.

Collimator sights have had uses as a small arms sight for low light situations (such as twilight or "room clearing" operations) since there is no intervening optical window that can block the light, allowing the use of both eyes with a relatively un-obstructed field of view. In recent years the introduction of illuminated reflex sights, holographic sights, and even telescopic sights; (for example the Advanced Combat Optical Gunsight (ACOG) using the "Bindon Aiming Concept") have replaced dedicated collimator sights since these other types of sights can be used with both eyes in the role of a collimator sight.

Collimator sights are also used in astronomy as Finderscopes to aim a telescope at a designated celestial object.

== See also ==
- Glossary of military abbreviations
- Red dot sight
- Reflector sight
- Collimated beam
