= Sight (device) =

Visual aiming device

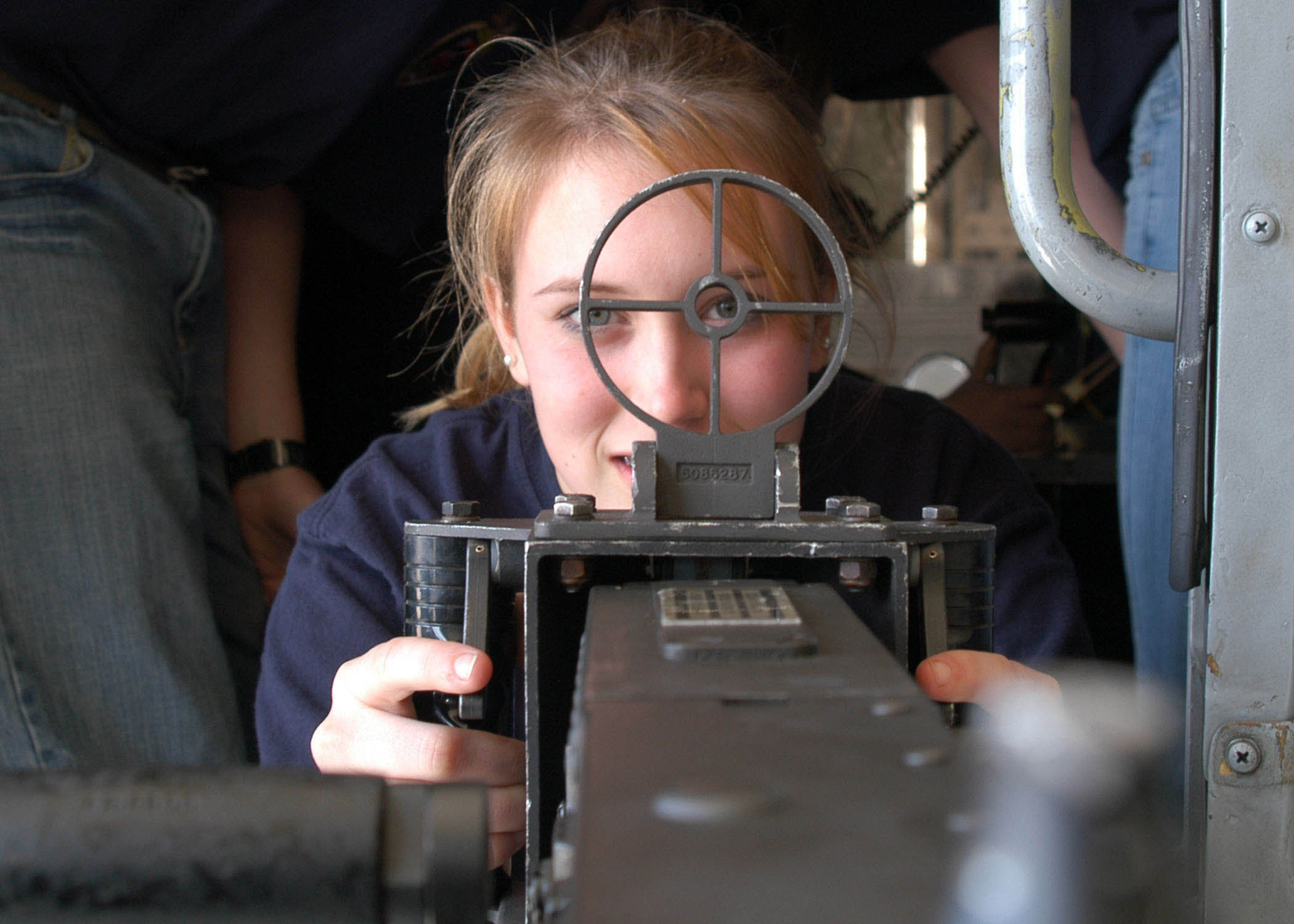
A Royal Canadian Sea Cadet looks through a machine gun sight.

A sight or sighting device is any device used to assist in precise visual alignment (i.e. aiming) of weapons, surveying instruments, aircraft equipment, optical illumination equipment or larger optical instruments with the intended target. Sights can be a simple set or system of physical markers that serve as visual references for directly aligning the user's line of sight with the target (such as iron sights on firearms), or optical instruments that provide an optically enhanced—often magnified—target image aligned in the same focus with an aiming point (e.g. telescopic, reflector and holographic sights). There are also sights that actively project an illuminated point of aim (a.k.a. "hot spot") onto the target itself so it can be observed by anyone with a direct view, such as laser sights and infrared illuminators on some night vision devices, as well as augmented or even virtual reality-enabled digital cameras ("smart scopes") with software algorithms that produce digitally enhanced target images.

== Iron sights ==
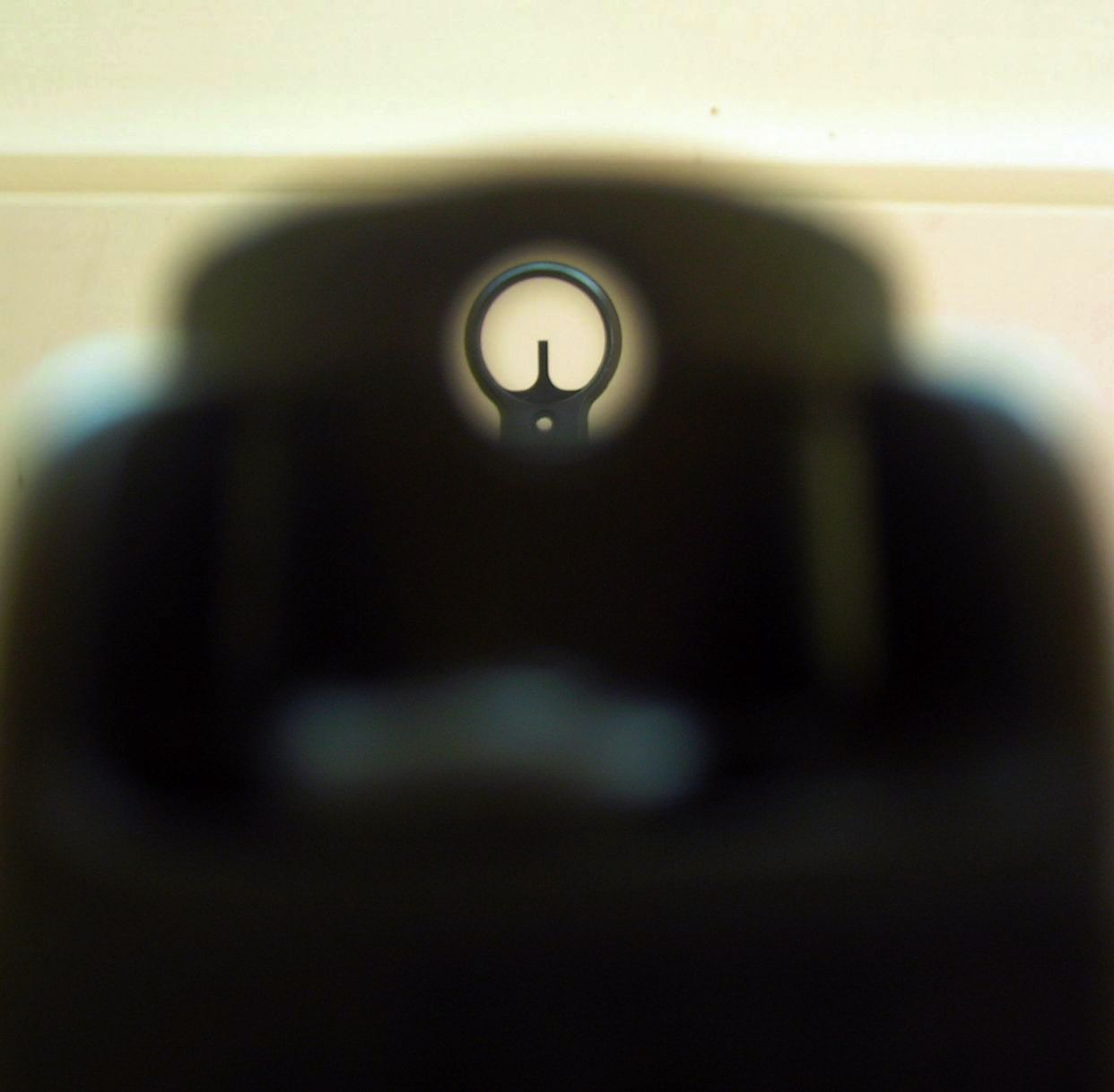
Picture through an aperture (or closed) iron sight on an H&K MP5 submachine gun

At its simplest, a sight typically has two components, front and rear aiming pieces that have to be lined up. Sights such as this can be found on many types of devices including weapons, surveying and measuring instruments, and navigational tools.

On weapons, these sights are usually formed by rugged metal parts, giving them the name "iron sights", as distinct from optical or computing sights. On many types of weapons they are built-in and may be fixed, adjustable, or marked for elevation, windage, target speed, etc. They are also classified in forms of notch (open sight) or aperture (closed sight). These types of sights can require considerable experience and skill, as the user has to hold proper eye position and simultaneously focus on the rear sight, the front sight, and a target, all at different distances, and align all three planes of focus.

== Optical sights ==
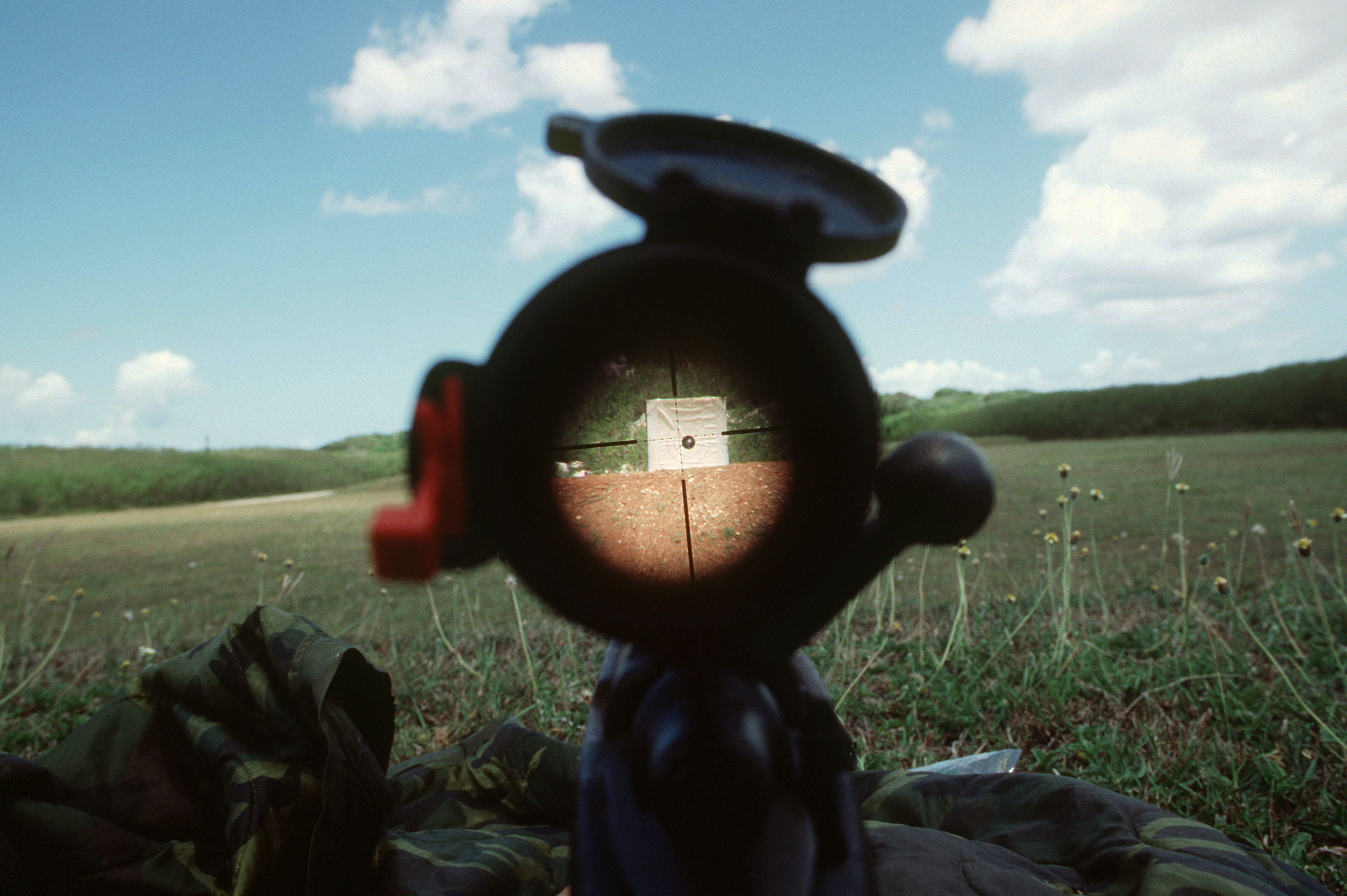
A view through a 20× power telescopic sight

Optical sights use optics that give the user an enhanced image with an aligned aiming point or pattern (also called a reticle) superimposed onto the target image, preferably at the same focal plane.

=== Telescopic sights ===
A telescopic sight is a refracting telescope equipped with some form of referencing pattern (reticle) mounted in an optically appropriate position in the optical system to give an accurate aiming point. Telescopic sights are used on a wide range of devices including guns, surveying equipment, and even as sights on larger telescopes (called a finderscope).

=== Reflector sights ===
Mark III free gun reflector sight mk 9 variant

Another type of optical sight is the reflector (or "reflex") sight, a generally non-magnifying optical device that allows the user to look through a glass element and see a reflection of an illuminated aiming point or some other image superimposed on the field of view. These sights have been around for over 100 years and have been used on all types of weapons and devices.

Reflector sights were first used as a weapon sight in German aircraft towards the end of World War I. Over the years they became more sophisticated, adding lead computing gyroscopes and electronics (the World War II Gyro gunsight) radar range finding and other flight information in the 1950s and 1960s, eventually becoming the modern head-up display.

=== Other types of optical sights ===
- Collimator sight
- Holographic weapon sight
- Laser sight
- Red dot magnifier used in conjunction with a non-magnified optical sight

== List of sights ==
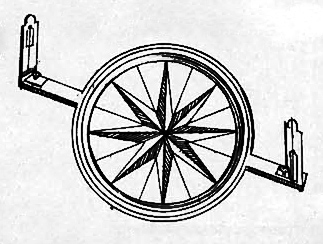
A circumferentor featuring a pair of slotted sights effectively constituting an alidade

There are many types of sighting devices. They can be fixed, mechanical, optical, computational, or a mixture of all of these attributes.

- Bombsight
- Collimator sight
- Diopter sight
- Globe sight
- Head-up display
- Holographic weapon sight
- Iron sight
- Laser sight
- Reflector sight
  - Gyro gunsight
  - Red dot sight
- Telescopic sight
- Thermal weapon sight
- Night vision device
- Fire-control system

== See also ==
- Gun laying
- Predicted impact point
- Tritium radioluminescence
