= Holosun =

American and Chinese manufacturer

- Type: Private company
- Industry: Firearms accessories
- Founded: 2013
- Website: holosun.com

Holosun is a Chinese manufacturer of small arms accessories and related goods with a sales office based in California.

== History ==
Holosun was established in 2013 in California. Their initial focus was on budget-priced weapon optics. Although they faced general skepticism, their low price point gained them market share. The quality of Holosun products began subpar. However, the quality improved significantly through the 2010s, which allowed them to rival more established manufacturers.

A feature of Holosun products (specifically for electronic sights) is “shake-awake:” a motion sensor in the optic will power on the optic when it senses motion, and power down when it does not sense motion for an extended period of time.

== Products ==
They have a family of thermal sights, including for pistols, as well as red dot and reflex sights, and laser sights.

Holosun sells a family of tactical lights.

== Operations ==
Holosun is a Chinese company. It has a sales office based in the U.S. state of California.

== Users ==
Holosun weapon sights have been adopted by the Estonian Military.

Holosun weapon sights have been adopted by the Chinese PLA since 2020, as their Chinese name Hwoyoung (昊阳) is equipped on 92 pistols, 95 carbines, and QBZ-191.

Holosun products have seen widespread use in Ukrainian service in the Russo-Ukrainian War. Holosun scopes have found their way into Russian service in the war as well, though through unconventional means. They have primarily been imported into Russia for alleged hunting use.
