= Red dot sight =

Type of firearm reflector sight

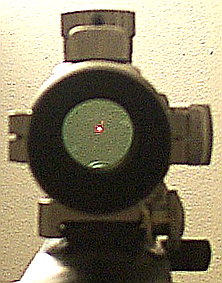
View through Tasco ProPoint red dot sight (model PDP2ST) on a Ruger 10/22. Made in Japan for Tasco, the ProPoint 2 was one of the first red dot sight models to become widely popular.

A red dot sight is a common classification for a non-magnifying reflector (or reflex) sight that provides an illuminated red dot to the user as a point of aim. A standard design uses a red light-emitting diode (LED) at the focus of collimating optics, which generates a dot-style illuminated reticle that stays in alignment with the firearm the sight is attached to, regardless of eye position (nearly parallax free).

Red dot sights are considered to be fast-acquisition and easy-to-use gun sights for firearms used in civilian target shooting, hunting, or in police and military applications. They are also used on cameras and telescopes. On cameras, they are used to photograph flying aircraft, birds in flight, and other distant, rapidly moving subjects. Telescopes have a narrow field of view and therefore are often equipped with a secondary "finder scope" such as a red dot sight to orient them.

== Description ==
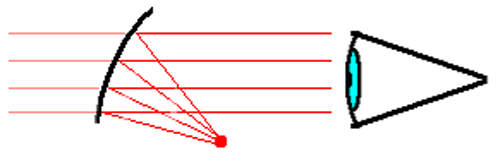
A diagram of a typical "red dot" sight using a collimating mirror with a light-emitting diode at its focus that creates a virtual "dot" image at infinity

The typical configuration for a red dot sight is a tilted spherical mirror reflector with a red light-emitting diode (LED) at its off axis focus. The mirror has a partially silvered multilayer dielectric dichroic coating designed to reflect just the red spectrum allowing most other light to pass through it. The LED used is usually deep red 670 nanometre wavelength since they are very bright, are high contrast against a green scene, and work well with a dichroic coating since they are near one end of the visible spectrum. The size of the dot generated by the LED is controlled by an aperture hole in front of it made from metal or coated glass.

The LED as a reticle is an innovation that greatly improves the reliability and general usefulness of the sight. There is no need for other optical elements to focus light behind a reticle. The LED itself is solid state and consumes very little power, allowing battery powered sights to run for hundreds and even tens of thousands of hours. Using a "dot" shaped reticle also greatly simplifies the sight since the small diameter image does not require a sophisticated optical reflector to focus it. More complex reticle patterns such as crosshairs or concentric circles can be used but need more complex aberration free optics.

Like other reflector sights, the collimated image of the red dot is truly parallax free only at infinity, with an error circle equal to the diameter of the collimating optics for any target at a finite distance. This is compensated for by keeping the dot in the middle of the optical window (sighting down the sight's optical axis). Some manufacturers modify the focus of the LED/optical collimator combination, making models with the optical collimator set to focus the dot at a finite distance. These have a maximum amount of parallax due to eye movement, equal to the size of the optical window, at close range, diminishing to a minimal amount at the set distance (somewhere around a desired target range of 25–50 meters).

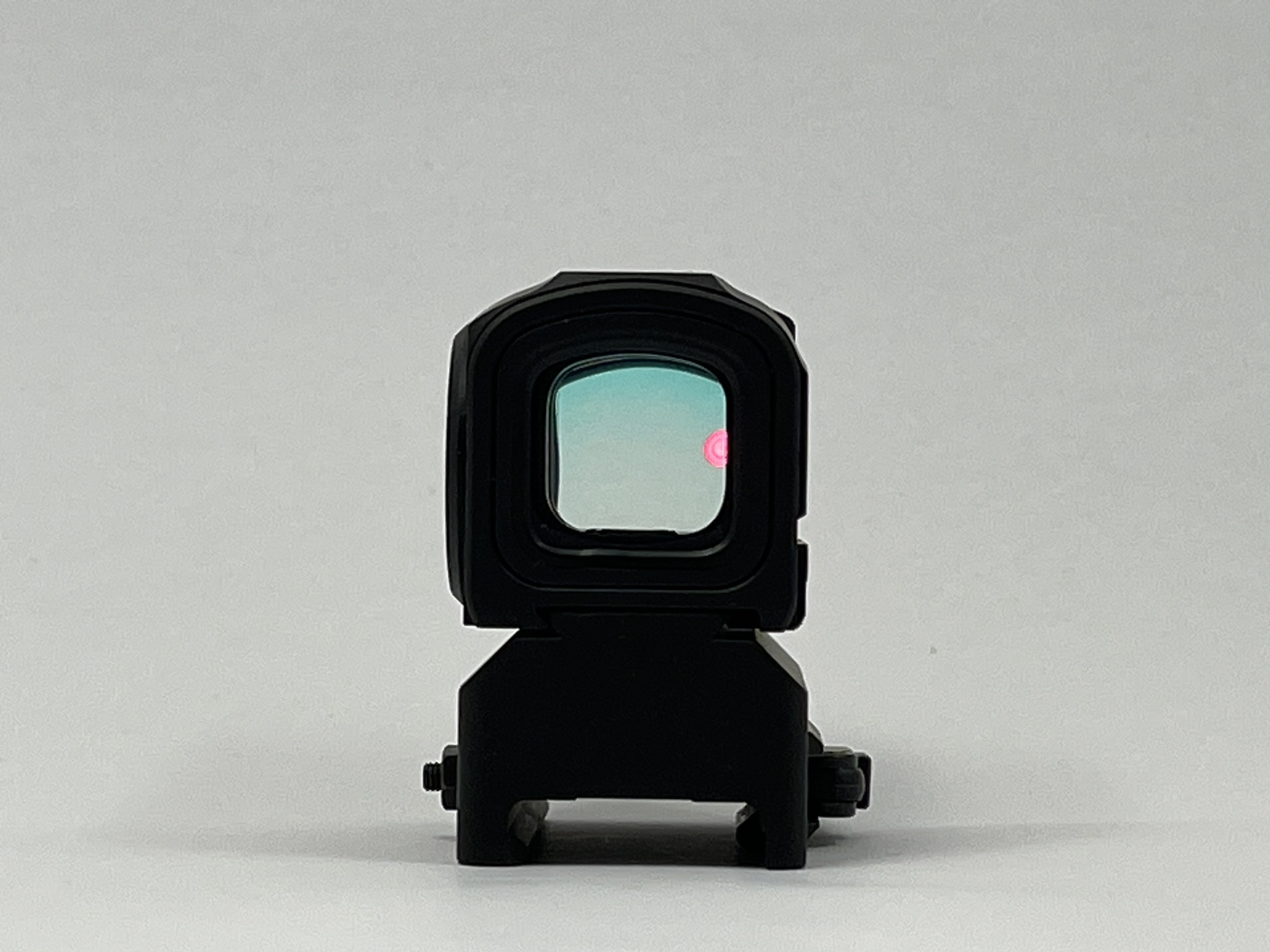
Reflex sights have varying dot viewing angles; that is the maximum angle the operator's eye can be offset from the center-axis of the sight whilst the dot still remains visible.

Sights may also use a more sophisticated optical system that compensates for off axis spherical aberration, an error that can cause the dot position to diverge off the sight's optical axis with change in eye position. The optics used is a type of Mangin mirror system, consisting of a meniscus lens corrector element combined with the semi-reflective mirror, sometimes referred to in advertising as a "two lens" or "double lens" system. Although these are referred to as "parallax free" sights, the system keeps the aiming dot in alignment only with the sight itself and does not compensate the inherent parallax errors induced by a collimated sight.

Red dot sights generally fall into two categories, "tube" or "open" designs. "Tube sights" look similar to a standard telescopic sight, with a cylindrical tube containing the optics. Tube sights offer the option of fitted dust covers and the ability to add filters, such as polarizing or haze filters, and glare reducing sunshades. Since a reflector sight really needs only a single optical surface, the "reflector", the tube is not needed. This allows for non-tubed "open sights" that consist of a flat base, with a single loop of material to support the reflective optics.

Most red dot sights have either active or passive adjustments for the dot brightness, allowing a very bright dot for high visibility in bright conditions, and a very dim dot to prevent loss of night vision in low light conditions.

== History ==
The idea of attaching a reflector (or reflex) sight to a firearm has been around since the sight's invention in 1900. Many different types of reflector sights specifically designed for firearms have been marketed, some lit by batteries and some lit by ambient light. The Weaver Qwik-Point presented the viewer with a red aiming dot generated by a red plastic "light pipe" used to collect ambient light. All had the reticle illumination drawback common with reflector sights small enough for a firearm: proper ambient lighting could not be depended on and incandescent light bulbs could drain a battery in a few hours.

In 1975, the Swedish optics company Aimpoint AB marketed the first "electronic" red dot sight combining a reflecting curved mirror and a light-emitting diode, based on a design by Helsingborg engineer John Arne Ingemund Ekstrand. The sight was called the "Aimpoint Electronic" and had a closed tube design that could be mounted similar to a telescopic sight. The LED could run for 1,500 to 3,000 hours on mercury batteries. Other manufacturers soon followed with over a dozen offering models today. Newer generation red dot sights were produced with lower power consumption LEDs and power saving electronics, allowing them to run for years without being turned off. In 2000, the U.S. military introduced a red dot sight into field use, the Aimpoint CompM2, designated the "M68 Close Combat Optic".

== Reticle sizes ==
Red dot sight reticle sizes are measured in milliradians (mrad) and minutes of angle (MOA), which both are angular measurements, making them handy units to use in ballistics. Milliradians are handy when using SI units for range and subtensions, and can be calculated by measuring the group size in millimeters (or in centimeters and multiplying by a factor of 10) and dividing by the range measured in meters. Minutes is another convenient measure for shooters using English units, since 1 MOA approximately subtends 1.0472 inches at a distance of 100 yards (91.44 m), which is generally rounded to 1 inch at 100 yards. While MOA sights have traditionally been popular in the U.S., scope sights with mrad adjustments and reticles are now also becoming increasingly popular in the U.S.

The most common reticles used today in red dot sights both for handguns and rifles are small dots covering between 0.6 and 1.6 mrad (2 to 5 MOA). The choice of red dot reticle size depends on the user needs. A larger and brighter red dot makes for faster target acquisition, but may obscure the target and thereby inhibit precise aiming, while a smaller and dim dot allows for more precise but slower aiming. The 1.6 mrad (5 MOA) dot is small enough not to obscure most handgun targets, and large enough for most competition shooters to quickly acquire a proper sight picture.

Red dots for rifles typically have a smaller dot, often 0.6 to 0.8 mrad (2 to 3 MOA). When red dot sights started to appear at the practical shooting competition circuit in the 1990s, reticle sizes of up to 3, 4.5 or even 6 mrad (10, 15 or 20 MOA) were common in order to compensate for the lack of bright illumination. However, as red dot technology and production quality has advanced, the market trend in all types of sport shooting has gone towards the smaller dots used today.

Subtensions for red dot sizes in milliradians
Reticle dot size	0.6 mrad (2.1 MOA)	0.8 mrad (2.8 MOA)	1.0 mrad (3.4 MOA)	1.2 mrad (4.1 MOA)	1.6 mrad (5.5 MOA)	1.8 mrad (6.2 MOA)	2.2 mrad (7.5 MOA)
Range 10 m	6 mm	8 mm	10 mm	12 mm	16 mm	18 mm	22 mm
Range 20 m	12 mm	16 mm	20 mm	24 mm	32 mm	36 mm	44 mm
Range 50 m	30 mm	40 mm	50 mm	60 mm	80 mm	90 mm	110 mm
Range 100 m	60 mm	80 mm	100 mm	120 mm	160 mm	180 mm	220 mm
	Formula: Subtension in mm = distance in m × dot size in mrad						

Subtensions for red dot sizes in minutes of arc
Reticle dot size	2.0 MOA (0.6 mrad)	3.0 MOA (0.9 mrad)	4.0 MOA (1.2 mrad)	5.0 MOA (1.5 mrad)	6.0 MOA (1.7 mrad)	8.0 MOA (2.3 mrad)
Range 25 yd (22.86 m)	0.5 in (13.3 mm)	0.8 in (19.9 mm)	1.0 in (26.6 mm)	1.3 in (33.2 mm)	1.6 in (39.9 mm)	2.1 in (53.2 mm)
Range 50 yd (45.72 m)	1.0 in (26.6 mm)	1.6 in (39.9 mm)	2.1 in (53.2 mm)	2.6 in (66.5 mm)	3.1 in (79.8 mm)	4.2 in (106.4 mm)
Range 100 yd (91.44 m)	2.1 in (53.2 mm)	3.1 in (79.8 mm)	4.2 in (106.4 mm)	5.2 in (133.0 mm)	6.3 in (159.6 mm)	8.4 in (212.8 mm)
	Formula: Subtension in inches = distance in yd x dot size in arcmin divided by 100					

== Mounting types ==
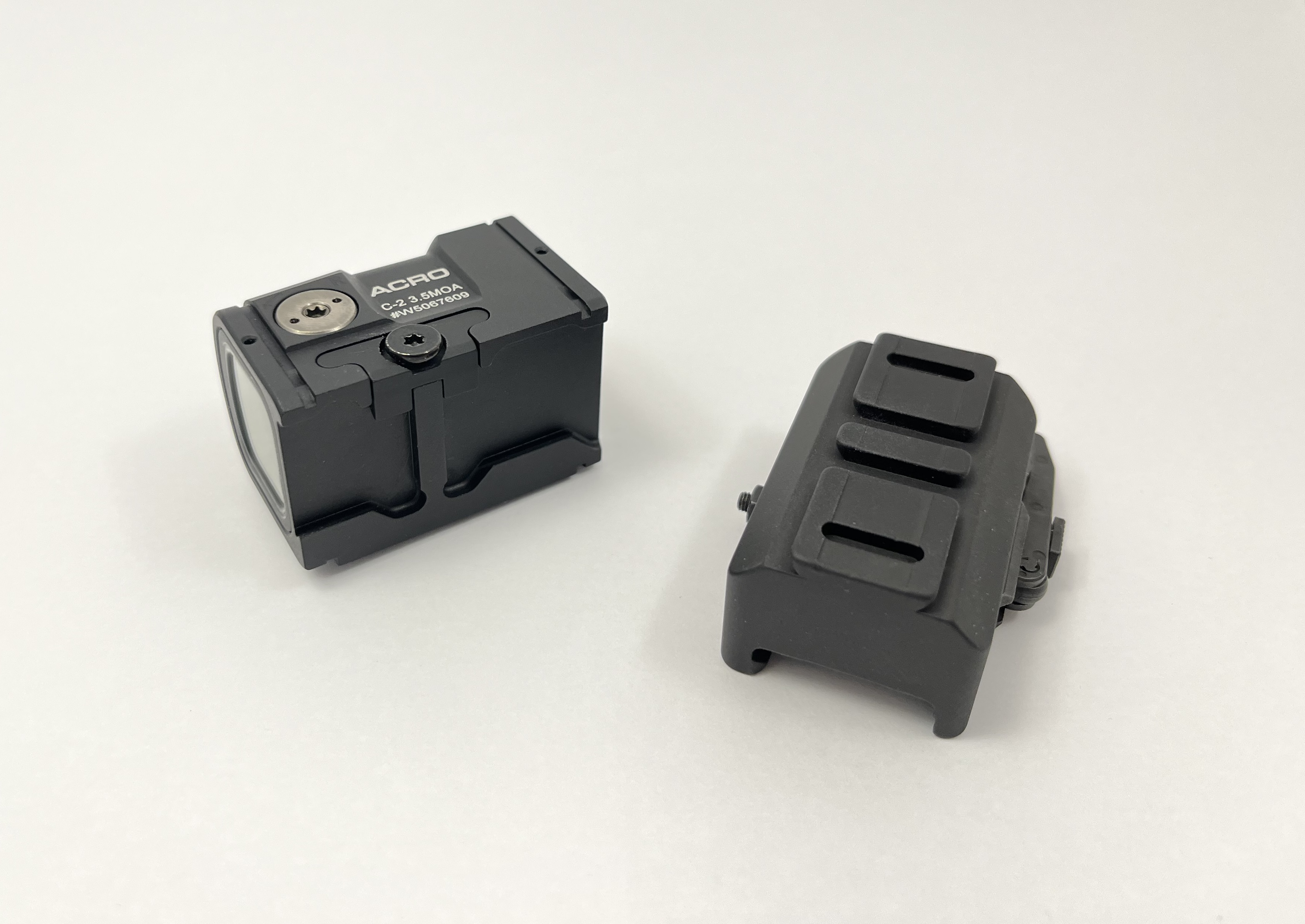
Left: Aimpoint Acro C2 reflex sight lying on its side. Right: Acro rail on a Picatinny rail riser.

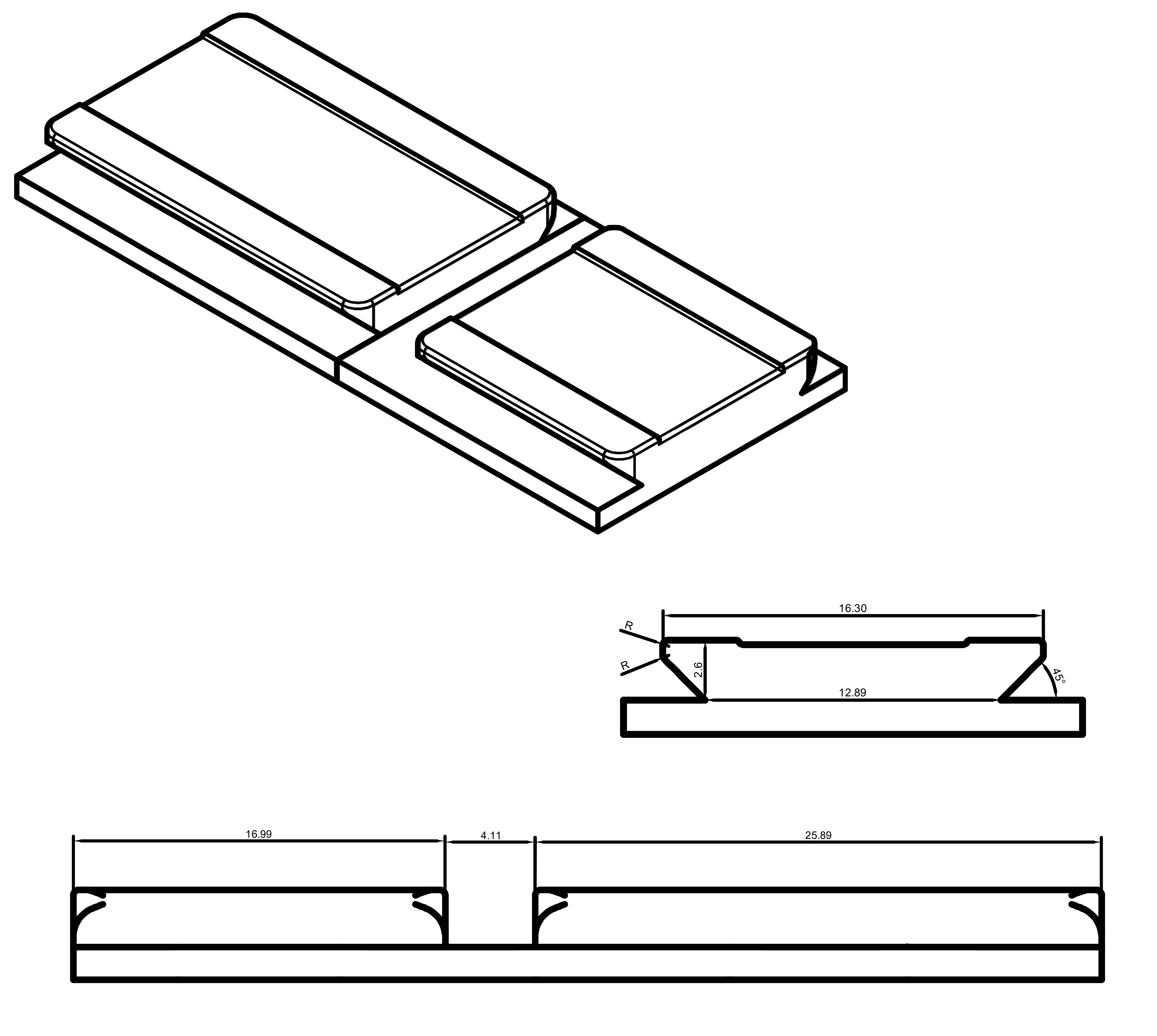
The approximate dimensions of an Aimpoint Acro dovetail rail.

There are various mounting types (also called "footprints") for red dot sights:

Aimpoint Acro rail
Launched in 2019 together with the sights Aimpoint Acro P-1 and C-1. The Acro rail is a dovetail rail for attaching a sight via a clamping mechanism, and with a 4 mm wide straight recoil lug groove. The mount is compact enough to be used on pistols, as well as rifles and shotguns. The dovetail is approximately 16.5 mm wide, and is radiused so as not to have any sharp edges. Also used on Aimpoint Acro C-2 and P-2, as well as Steiner MPS, Viridian RFX 45, CH Duty, Lucid Optics E7 and Vector Frenzy Plus.

Aimpoint A-Cut
A collaboration between Aimpoint and Glock that uses a wedge system to hold down the front of the optic while using the rear iron sights to hold down the back of the optic. Currently the Aimpoint COA is the only red dot sight to use this mounting standard.

Aimpoint Micro standard
First introduced in 2007 on the small tube sight variants of Aimpoint, but has also been used extensively by other manufacturers as well. Popular on rifles and shotguns, but not on handguns due to its size. The mounting standard uses four screws and one cross slot acting as a recoil lug. Used on red dot sights such as Aimpoint Micro, Vortex Crossfire, SIG Sauer ROMEO4 & 5, and some Holosun Paralow variants.

C-More standard
A mounting standard introduced by C-More Sights. Uses two screws and two notches acting as recoil lugs. Used on red dot sights such as Delta Optical MiniDot, Kahles Helia, Vortex Razor and SIG Sauer ROMEO3.

Docter/Noblex standard
The mounting pattern used by the largest number of manufacturers, perhaps due to the wide range of aftermarket mounts available. The mounting standard uses two screws and four notches acting as recoil lugs. Used on red dot sights such as Docter/Noblex sights, Burris Fastfire, Vortex Viper, Leica Tempus, etc.

Trijicon RMR standard
Has two screw holes, and two shallow notches acting as recoil lugs. Mainly used on the Trijicon RMR red dot sight, as well as on some Holosun sights. A smaller version, the Trijicon RMRcc, uses a narrower footprint and is designed for use on slimmer handguns.

Shield standard
A proprietary standard used by Shield Sights. Similar in shape to the Noblex/Docter footprint, but with other dimensions. In addition to the Shield red dot sights, it is also used on the Leupold Delta Point Pro.

Other unique footprints
Some notable red dot sights which have unique footprints not compatible with any of the above are SIG Sauer Romeo1, Holosun Paralow 403A, Holosun 509T and Swampfox Kraken MRDS.

== Uses ==
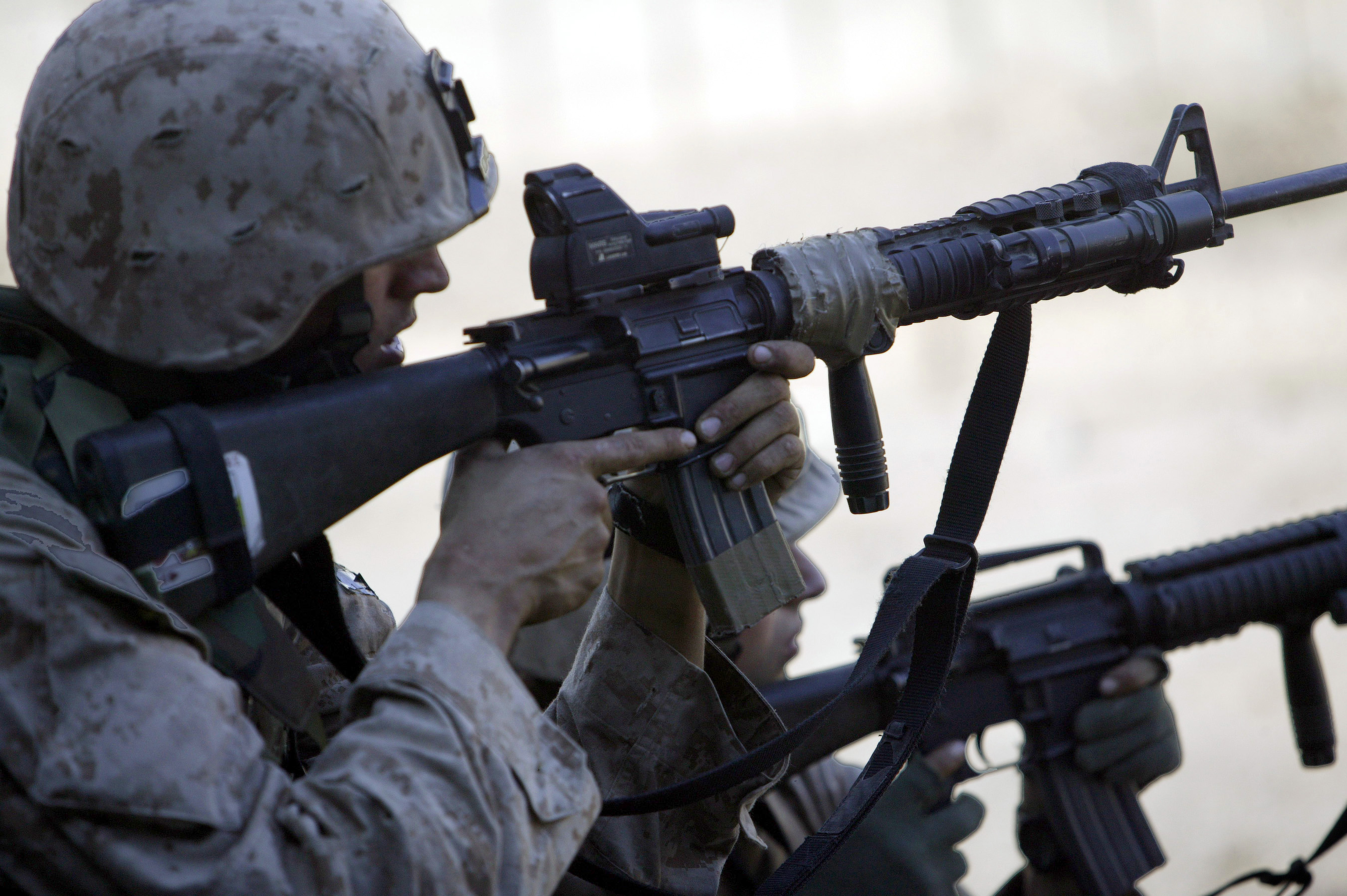
A U.S. Marine looking through an ITL MARS combination red dot and laser sight mounted on his M16A4 MWS rifle during the Second Battle of Fallujah, 2004

Red dot sights place the target and the reticle on nearly the same optical plane, allowing a single point of focus. This makes them fast-acquisition and easy-to-use sights, allowing the user to keep their attention on the field of view in front of them. They are common in speed shooting sports such as IPSC. Military units and police forces have also adopted them. Red dot sights are also popular among paintball and airsoft players for similar reasons.

Because there is no magnification the shooter need not worry about parallax or eye relief. The long eye relief makes red dot sights appropriate for firearms with heavy recoil that might drive a conventional short eye relief telescopic sight into the shooter's eye. Since dot sights can be mounted at any distance from the shooter's eye with no issues of focus, military rifle mounts usually place the sight in any mechanically-convenient mounting position, such as the carrying handle of the M16 rifle, or on a rail system, typically a Picatinny rail, on top of the rifle. This leaves plenty of room for night vision equipment to be used with the red dot sight.

Miniature red dot sights are becoming increasingly popular for use on pistols, both for competition and military applications.

A red dot sight can be combined with a red dot magnifier, a small optical telescope mounted behind the sight to provide increased magnification to a shooter's view.

== See also ==
- Aimpoint CompM2, CompM4, and ITL MARS red dot sights
- Collimator sight, blind non-magnifying sights that (depending on the reticle used) had a "red dot" aiming point
- Glossary of firearms terminology
- Iron sight
- Holographic weapon sight
- Laser sight, projects a red (or other-colored) aiming point onto a distant target
- Telescopic sight
- Prism sight, a type of telescopic sight
