= Aimpoint CompM2 =

Battery-powered, non-magnifying red dot type of reflex sight for firearms

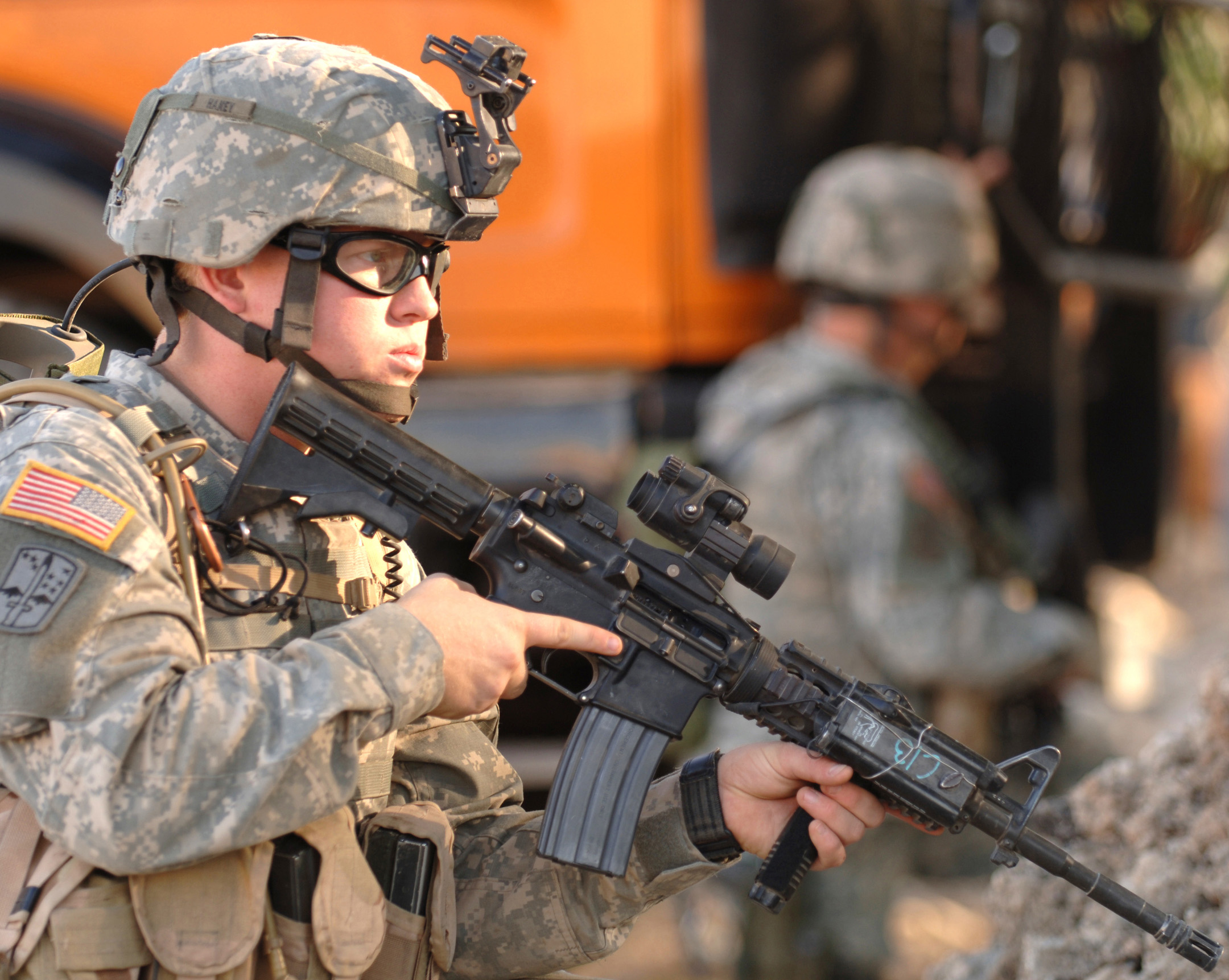
Colt M4 carbine with M68 Close Combat Optic and back-up sight.

The CompM2 is a battery-powered, non-magnifying red dot type of reflex sight for firearms manufactured by Aimpoint AB. It was first introduced in the U.S. Armed Forces in 2000, designated as the M68 Close Combat Optic (M68 CCO; NSN: 1240-01-411-1265). It is also known as the M68 Aimpoint and is designed to meet United States military standards. The sight is designed for use with the M16/M4 family of rifles, but can be mounted on any weapon fitted with an upper Picatinny rail. It is also NVG-compatible—the aiming dot is still visible through night vision scopes and goggles. The Army's M68 designation was also applied to a later version of the sight, the Aimpoint CompM4.

== Overview ==
The M68 is parallax-free at around 45.7 m (50 yards), meaning that the red dot will not change position based on eye position at that range. At shorter ranges the point of aim will change position based on eye position with the maximum error being equal to the radius of the sight's optical window at short range. The sight is water-tight down to 25 meters and runs on one 3-volt lithium battery type 2L76 or DL1/3N. Aiming dot brightness is adjustable for better visibility or increased battery life.

The CompM2 is used across branches of the U.S. Armed Forces, Sweden, and various NATO countries, among them Norway. A variant known as the ECOS-N (NSN: 1240-01-495-1385) is also issued as part of the U.S. SOPMOD kit. The sight is also available on the civilian market and is employed by various law enforcement organizations (especially for SWAT type situations that involve close quarters work) and by recreational shooters.

By August 2011, the U.S. Army had bought 1,000,000 M68 Close Combat Optics. Some 85 percent of Army M4s are issued with the CCO, though optics can vary depending on unit. The sight allows soldiers to engage targets out to 300 meters while keeping both eyes open for situational awareness. Post combat surveys show an 85 percent acceptance rate of the CCO as an effective optic and for its value for close quarters fighting.

In July 2009, the Army purchased 565,783 Aimpoint CompM4 sights (a later version of the CompM2), as part of the M68 CCO program.

=== Dimensions ===
- Length: 130 mm (5.1 in)
- Width: 55 mm (2.2 in)
- Height: 55 mm (2.2 in)
- Mounting ring width: 30 mm (1.2 in)

== Users ==
- Chile
- Greece: Used by Hellenic Army SF.
- Malaysia: Used by PASKAL on XM8 and Heckler & Koch G36E rifles.
- Montenegro
- Norway: Used on Heckler & Koch HK416.
- Sweden
- Uganda: Mounted and used on M4 carbines in African Union mission in Somalia.
- Ukraine: M68 Close Combat Optic donated by United States to Ukrainian Special Forces
- United States

== See also ==
- SOPMOD
