= Sight magnifier =

Type of firearm sight accessory

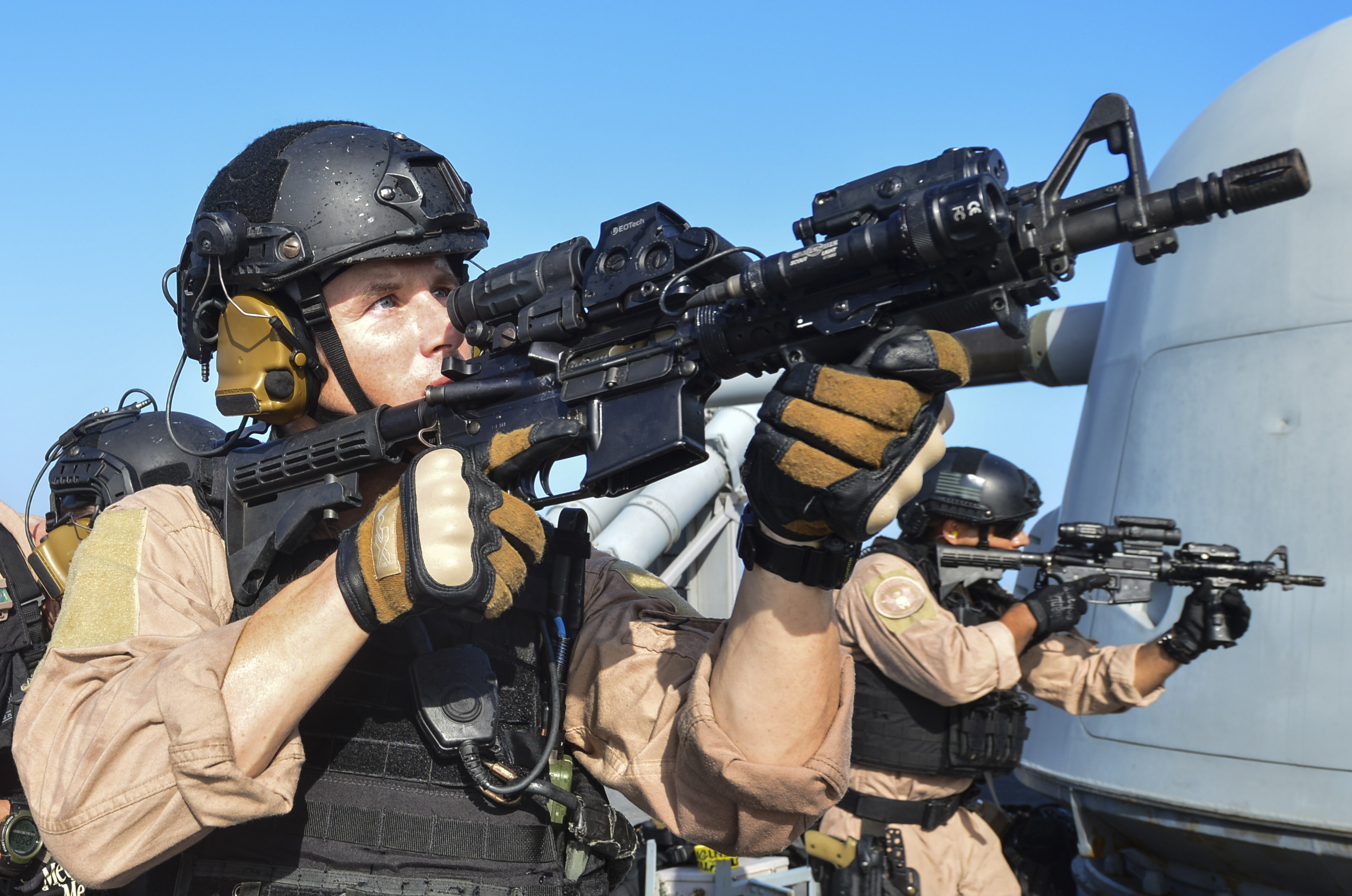
A United States Coast Guard Maritime Law Enforcement Specialist with an EOTech holographic sight and a magnifier on a CQBR variant M4 carbine. The pictured magnifier is flipped in, and is magnifying the view through the sight. (Note: The Maritime Enforcement Specialist closest to the camera has his magnifier flipped in. A teammate in the background has his magnifier flipped out.)

A sight magnifier is an optical telescope that can be paired with a non-magnifying optical sight on a weapon to create a telescopic sight. They work with the parallel collimated reticle image produced by red dot sights and holographic weapon sights. They may synonymously be referred to as a red dot magnifier, reflex sight magnifier, holographic sight magnifier, or flip to side magnifiers.

== Description ==
Sight magnifiers are optical telescopes that provide increased magnification to a shooter's view when they are engaged. They are commonly mounted behind red dot and holographic sights that produce a collimated reticle image. Most have mounts which allow them to flip to the side when not in use, though immobile mounts exist as well. This allows the user to switch between a non-magnified image and a telescopic magnified view for more distant targets.

Magnifiers typically are 3× telescopes, but can range from 2–6× or more. They are used by police and special operations forces who may use the non-magnified optic for close-quarters combat and utilize the magnifier to engage further targets. Hunters may also use them as the increased magnification can aid in target discrimination when prey are difficult to spot in brush or vegetation.

Magnifiers offer several advantages and disadvantages compared to other firearm sights. Use of the magnifier is very quick and is easier than rotating the housing of a traditional telescopic sight. However, there typically is no option to make fine increases or decreases in zoom, as one would be able to with a standard telescopic sight. Weight may also become an issue. While the non-magnified optic and the magnifier may each be lighter than other optics, when combined with mounts a magnifier setup might be significantly heavier and/or unbalanced compared to traditional telescopic sights. When flipped to the side, the magnifier may also snag on obstacles. The same may apply to cost with the combined cost for optic, magnifier, and mounts might be greater than the cost for a variable power telescopic sight.

== Use ==
A magnifier is mounted onto a firearm, usually on a Picatinny rail, in line with the primary non-magnified optic. When not in use, the magnifier may be flipped to the side (usually the right) so that the shooter sees through their non-magnified optic alone; when flipped in line, it will magnify the view through the non-magnified optic. This will also have the effect of magnifying the sight so that the red dot or holographic reticle will appear larger. When flipped in, the user will also have to account for parallax and eye relief. The non-magnified optic and the magnifier is placed so that the user will have the correct amount of eye relief when looking through the magnifier.
