= Reflector sight =

Optical device for aiming

- Classification: Sight
- Industry: Arms
- Application: Aiming point
- Inventor: Howard Grubb
- Invented: 1900 (126 years ago)

A view through the Mark III Free Gun Reflector Sight, first produced in 1943, used on British army guns, naval guns, and as a pilot sight and a defensive gun sight on aircraft. The reticle image in this sight is produced by an optical collimator creating the virtual image at infinity and a beam splitter bouncing off the image toward the eyes. The dot remains on the target even though the viewer's head is moved side to side.

A reflector sight or reflex sight is an optical sight that allows the user to look through a partially reflecting glass element and see an aiming point or some image (helping to aim the device, to which the sight is attached, on the target) superimposed on the field of view. These sights work on the simple optical principle that anything (such as an illuminated reticle) at the focus of a lens or curved mirror will appear to be sitting in front of the viewer at infinity. Reflector sights employ some form of "reflector" to allow the viewer to see the infinity image and the field of view at the same time, either by bouncing the image created by lens off a slanted glass plate, or by using a mostly clear curved glass reflector that images the reticle while the viewer looks through the reflector. Since the reticle image is at infinity, it stays in alignment with the device to which the sight is attached regardless of the viewer's eye position to the sight, removing most of the parallax and other sighting errors found in simple sighting devices.

Since their invention in 1900, reflector sights have come to be used as gun sights on various weapons. They were used on fighter aircraft, in a limited capacity in World War I, widely used in World War II, and still used as the base component in many types of modern head-up displays. They have been used in other types of (usually large) weapons as well, such as anti-aircraft gun sights, anti-tank gun sights, and any other role where the operator had to engage fast moving targets over a wide field of view, and the sight itself could be supplied with sufficient electrical power to function. There was some limited use of the sight on small arms after World War II, but the sight came into widespread use during the late 1970s with the invention of the red dot sight. This sight uses a red light-emitting diode (LED) as its illumination source, making a durable, dependable sight with an extremely long illumination run time.

Other applications of reflector sights include sights on surveying equipment, optical telescope pointing aids, and camera viewfinders.

== Design ==
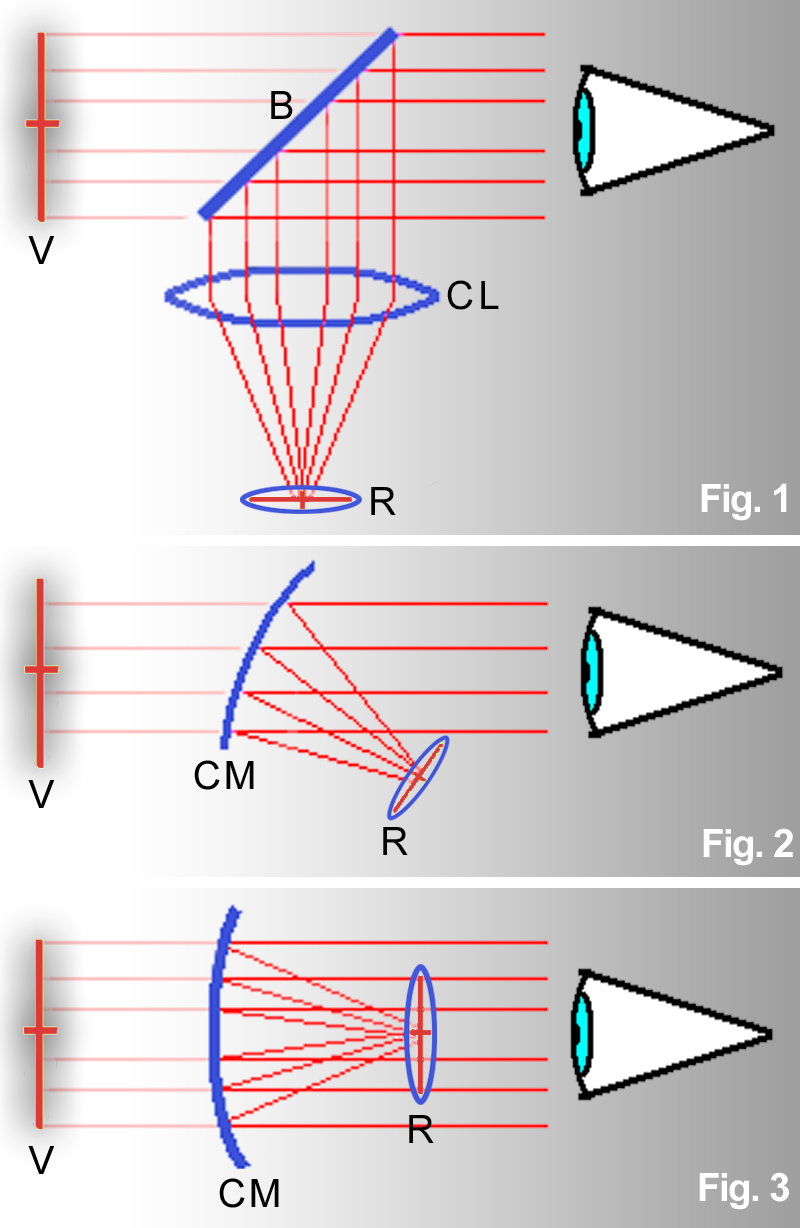
Diagram of three types of reflector sights. The top uses a collimating lens (CL) and a beam splitter (B) to create a virtual image at infinity (V) of a reticle (R). The bottom two use half silvered curved mirrors (CM) as the collimating optics

Reflector sights work by using a lens or an image-forming curved mirror with a luminous or reflective overlay image or reticle at its focus, creating an optical collimator that produces a virtual image of that reticle. The image is reflected off some form of angled beam splitter or the partially silvered collimating curved mirror itself so that the observer (looking through the beam splitter or mirror) will see the image at the focus of the collimating optics superimposed in the sight's field of view in focus at ranges up to infinity. Since the optical collimator produces a reticle image made up of collimated light, light that is nearly parallel, the light making up that image is theoretically perfectly parallel with the axis of the device or gun barrel it is aligned with, i.e. with no parallax at infinity. The collimated reticle image can also be seen at any eye position in the cylindrical volume of collimated light created by the sight behind the optical window. But this also means, for targets closer than infinity, sighting towards the edge of the optical window can make the reticle move in relation to the target since the observer is sighting down a parallel light bundle at the edge. Eye movement perpendicular to the device's optical axis will make the reticle image move in exact relationship to eye position in the cylindrical column of light created by the collimating optics.

A common type (used in applications such as aircraft gun sights) uses a collimating lens and a beam splitter. This type tends to be bulky since it requires at least two optical components, the lens and the beam splitter/glass plate. The reticle collimation optics are situated at 90° to the optical path making lighting difficult, usually needing additional electric illumination, condensing lenses, etc. A more compact type replaces the lens/beam splitter configuration with a half silvered or dichroic curved collimating mirror set at an angle that performs both tasks of focusing and combining the image of an offset reticle. This type is most often seen as the red dot type used on small arms. It is also possible to place the reticle between the viewer and the curved mirror at the mirror's focus. The reticle itself is too close to the eye to be in focus but the curved mirror presents the viewer with an image of the reticle at infinity. This type was invented by Dutch optical engineer Lieuwe van Albada in 1932, originally as a camera viewfinder, and was also used as a gunsight on World War II bazookas: the US M9 and M9A1 "Bazooka" featured the D7161556 folding "Reflecting Sight Assembly".

The viewing portion of a reflector sight does not use any refractive optical elements, it is simply a projected reticle bounced off a beam splitter or curved mirror right into the users eye. This gives it the defining characteristics of not needing considerable experience and skill to use, as opposed to simple mechanical sights such as iron sights. A reflector sight also does not have the field of view and eye relief problems of sights based on optical telescopes: depending on design constraints their field of view is the user's naked eye field of view, and their non-focusing collimated nature means they do not have the optical telescopes constraint of eye relief. Reflector sights can be combined with telescopes, usually by placing the telescope directly behind the sight so it can view the projected reticle creating a telescopic sight, but this re-introduces the problems of narrow field of view and limited eye relief. The primary drawback of reflector sight is that they need some way to illuminate the reticle to function. Reticles illuminated by ambient light are hard to use in low light situations, and sights with electrical illumination stop functioning altogether if that system fails.

== History ==
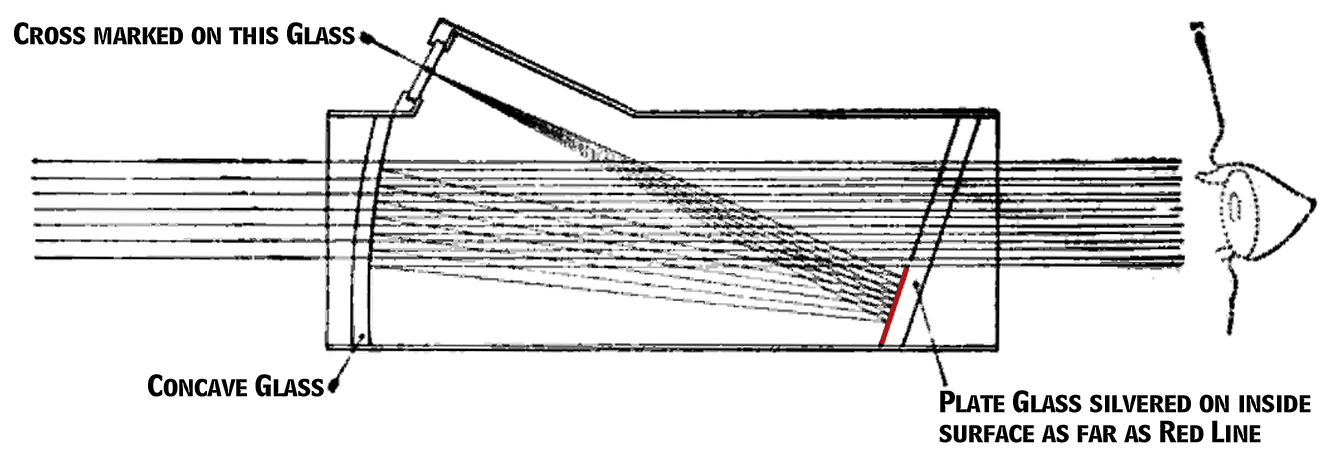
1901 diagram of a version of Howard Grubb's collimating reflector sight designed to make a compact version suitable for firearms and small devices. Ambient lighting of the reticle was improved by placing it facing up and bouncing it off a relay mirror then off a concave collimating mirror

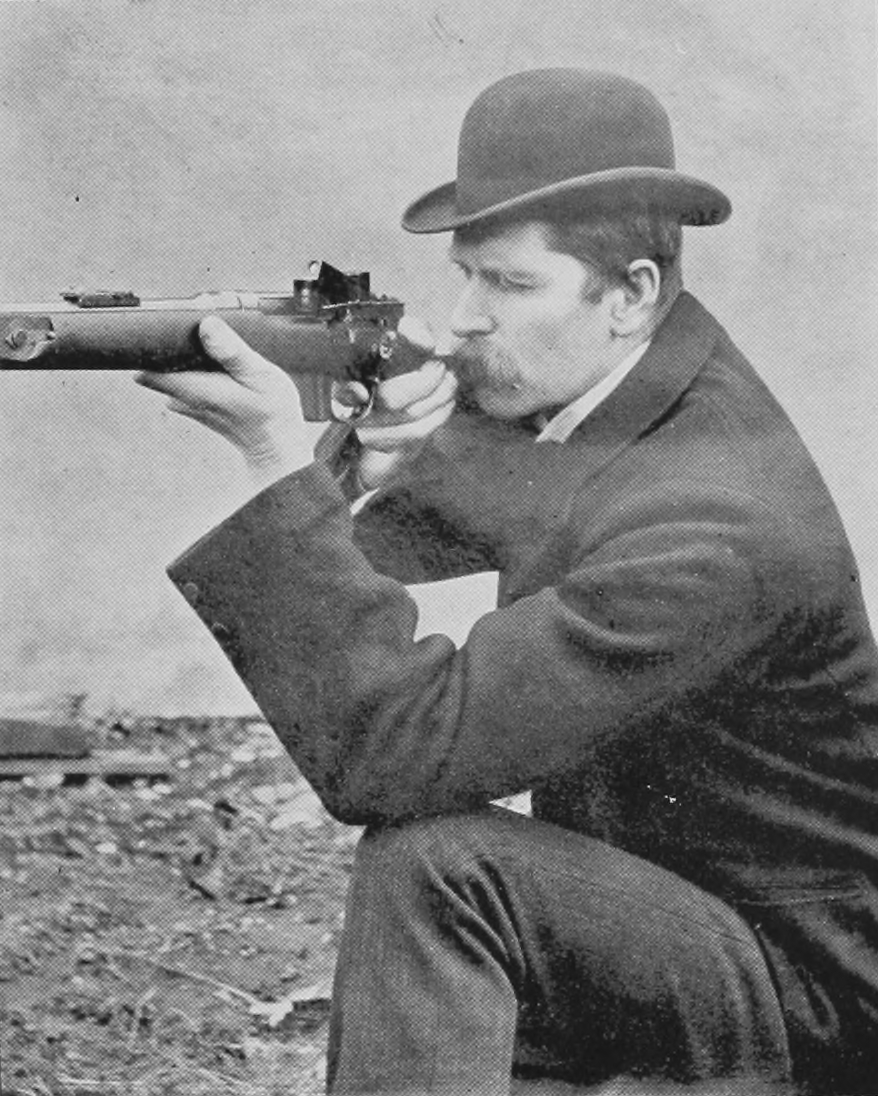
Prototype of the Grubb reflector sight attached to a rifle

The idea of a reflector sight originated in 1900 with Irish optical designer and telescope maker Howard Grubb in patent No.12108. Grubb conceived of his "Gun Sight for large and small Ordnance" as a better alternative to the difficult to use iron sight while avoiding the telescopic sight's limited field of view, greater apparent target speed, parallax errors, and the danger of keeping the eye against an eye stop. In the 1901 the Scientific Transactions of the Royal Dublin Society he described his invention as:

It would be possible to conceive an arrangement by which a fine beam of light like that from a search light would be projected from a gun in the direction of its axis and so adjusted as to correspond with the line of fire so that wherever the beam of light impinged upon an object the shot would hit. This arrangement would be of course equally impracticable for obvious reasons but it is instanced to show that a beam of light has the necessary qualifications for our purposes.

Now the sight which forms the subject of this Paper attains a similar result not by projecting an actual spot of light or an image on the object but by projecting what is called in optical language a virtual image upon it.

It was noted soon after its invention that the sight could be a good alternative to iron sights and also had uses in surveying and measuring equipment. The reflector sight was first used on German fighter aircraft in 1918 and widely adopted on all kinds of fighter and bomber aircraft in the 1930s. By World War II the reflector sight was being used on many types of weapons besides aircraft, including anti-aircraft guns, naval guns, anti-tank weapons, and many other weapons where the user needed the simplicity and quick target acquisition nature of the sight. Through its development in the 1930s and into World War II the sight was also being referred to in some applications by the abbreviation "reflex sight".

== Weapon sights ==
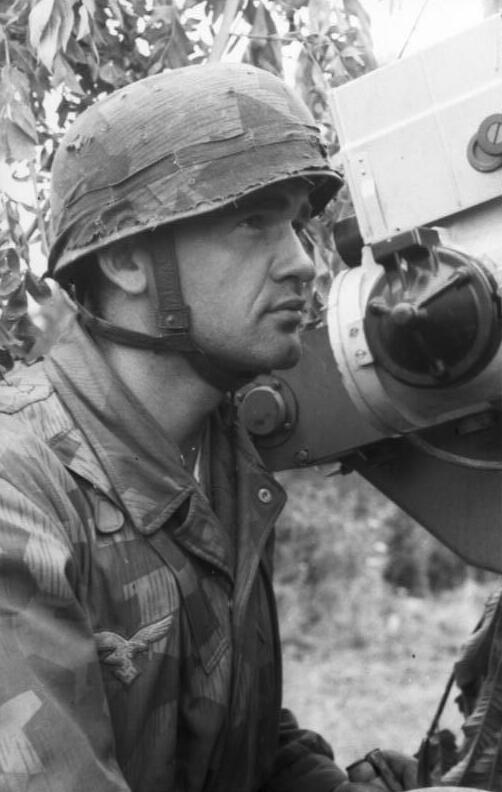
German paratrooper looks through the reflector sight of the Flakvisier 40 gunsight on a FlaK 38 anti-aircraft gun (1944), one of the more sophisticated sights at the time

Reflector sights were invented as an improved gun-sight and since their invention they have been adapted to many types of weapons. When used with different types of guns, reflector sights are considered an improvement over simple iron sights (sights composed of two spaced metal aiming points that have to be aligned). Iron sights take considerable experience and skill in the user who has to hold a proper eye position and focus exclusively on the front sight, keeping it centered on the (unfocused) rear sight, while keeping the whole centered on a target at different distances, requiring alignment of all three planes of focus to achieve a hit. The reflector sight's single, parallax-free virtual image, in focus with the target, removes this aiming problem, helping poor, average, and expert shooters alike.

Since the collimated image produced by the sight is only truly parallax free at infinity, the sight has an error circle equal to the diameter of the collimating optics for any target at a finite distance. Depending on the eye position behind the sight and the closeness of the target this induces some aiming error. For larger targets at a distance (given the non-magnifying, quick target acquisitions nature of the sight) this aiming error is considered trivial. On small arms aimed at close targets this is compensated for by keeping the reticle in the middle of the optical window (sighting down its optical axis). Some manufacturers of small arms sights also make models with the optical collimator set at a finite distance. This gives the sight parallax due to eye movement the size of the optical window at close range which diminishes to a minimal size at the set distance (somewhere around a desired target range of 25–50 yd (23–46 m)).

Compared to standard telescopic sights, a reflector sight can be held at any distance from the eye (does not require a designed eye relief), and at almost any angle, without distorting the image of the target or reticle. They are often used with both eyes open (the brain will tend to automatically superimpose the illuminated reticle image coming from the dominant eye onto the other eye's unobstructed view), giving the shooter normal depth perception and full field of view. Since reflector sights are not dependent on eye relief, they can theoretically be placed in any mechanically-convenient mounting position on a weapon.

=== Aircraft ===
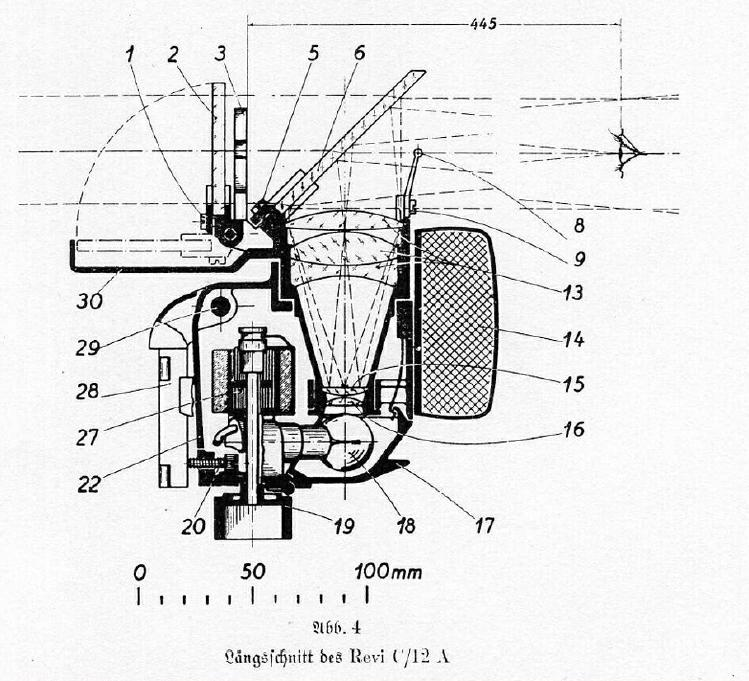
Longitudinal cross-section of a basic reflector sight for pre-WWII German fighter planes (1937 German Revi C12/A)

The earliest record of the reflector sight being used with fighter aircraft was in 1918. The optical firm of Optische Anstalt Oigee of Berlin, working from the Grubb patents, developed two versions what came to be known as the Oigee Reflector Sight. Both used a 45 degree angle glass beam splitter and electrical illumination and were used to aim the plane's machine guns. One version was used in operational trials on the biplane Albatros D.Va and triplane Fokker Dr.1 fighters. There was some interest in this sight after World War I but reflector sights in general were not widely adopted for fighter and bomber aircraft until the 1930s, first by the French, then by most other major airforces. These sights were not only used for aiming fighter aircraft, they were used with aircraft defensive guns and in bombsights.

Reflector sights as aircraft gun-sights have many advantages. The pilot/gunner need not position their head to align the sight line precisely as they did in two-point mechanical sights, head position is only limited to that determined by the optics in the collimator, mostly by the diameter of the collimator lens. The sight does not interfere with the overall view, particularly when the collimator light is turned off. Both eyes may be used simultaneously for sighting.

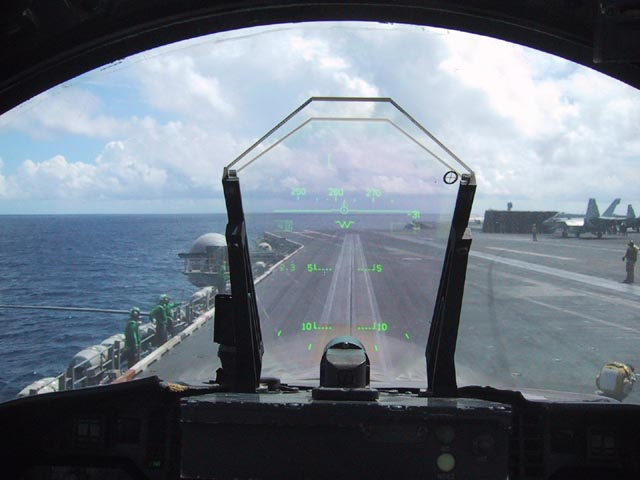
HUD inside the cockpit of a fighter jet

The optical nature of the reflector sight meant it was possible to feed other information into field of view, such as modifications of the aiming point due to deflection determined by input from a gyroscope. 1939 saw the development by the British of the first of these gyro gunsights, reflector sights adjusted by gyroscope for the aircraft's speed and rate of turn, enabling the display of a lead-adjusted sighting reticle that lagged the actual "boresight" of the weapon(s), allowing the boresight to lead the target in a turn by the proper amount for effective shooting.

As reflector sight designs advanced after World War II, giving the pilot more and more information, they eventually evolved into the head-up display (HUD). The illuminated reticle was eventually replaced by a video screen at the focus of the collimating optics that not only gave a sighting point and information from a lead-finding computer and radar, but also various aircraft indicators (such as an artificial horizon, compass, altitude and airspeed indicators), facilitating the visual tracking of targets or the transition from instrument to visual methods during landings.

=== Firearms ===
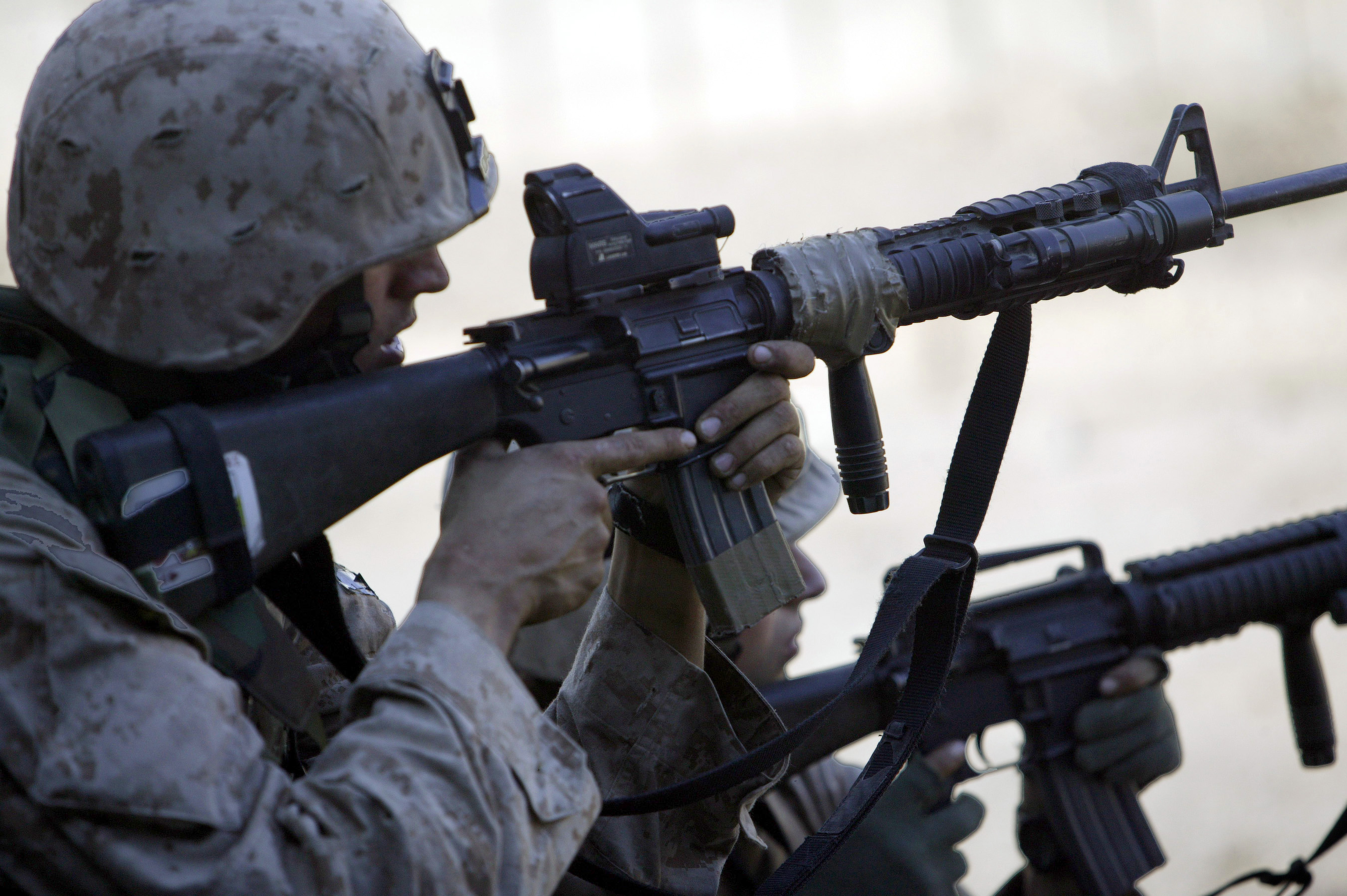
A US Marine looking through an ITL MARS reflex sight on his M16A4 rifle

The idea of attaching a reflector sight to a firearm has been around since its invention in 1900. Soon after World War II, models appeared for rifles and shotguns including the Nydar shotgun sight (1945), which used a curved semi-reflective mirror to reflect an ambient lit reticle, and the Giese electric gunsight (1947), which had a battery-powered illuminated reticle. Later types included the Qwik-Point (1970) and the Thompson Center Insta-Sight. Both were beam-splitter type reflector sights that used ambient light: illuminating a green crosshair in the Insta-Sight, and a red plastic rod "light pipe" that produced a red aiming spot reticle in the Qwik-Point.

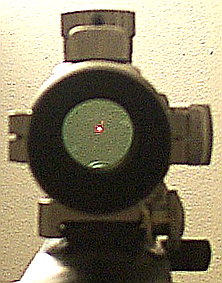
A view through a Tasco ProPoint red dot sight

The mid- to late 1970s saw the introduction of what are usually referred to as red dot sights, a type that gives the user a simple bright red dot as an aiming point. The typical configuration for this sight is a compact curved mirror reflector design with a red LED at its focus. Using an LED as a reticle is an innovation that greatly improves the reliability and general usefulness of the sight: there is no need for other optical elements to focus light behind a reticle; the mirror can use a dichroic coating to reflect just the red spectrum, passing through most other light; and the LED itself is solid state and consumes very little power, allowing battery-powered sights to run for hundreds and even tens of thousands of hours.

Reflector sights for military firearms (usually referred to as reflex sights) took a long time to be adopted. The US House Committee on Armed Services noted as far back as 1975 on the suitability of the use of reflex sight for the M16 rifle, but the US military did not widely introduce reflector sights until the early 2000s with the Aimpoint CompM2 red dot sight, designated the "M68 Close Combat Optic".

== Reticle types ==
Many reticle illumination and pattern options are available. Common light sources used in firearm reflector sights include battery powered lights, fiber optic light collectors, and even tritium capsules. Some sights are specifically designed to be visible when viewed through night vision devices. The color of a sight reticle is often red or amber for visibility against most backgrounds. Some sights use a chevron or triangular pattern instead, to aid precision aiming and range estimation, and still others provide selectable patterns.

Sights that use dot reticles are almost invariably measured in minutes of arc, sometimes called "minutes of angle" or "moa". Moa is a convenient measure for shooters using Imperial or US customary units, since 1 moa subtends approximately 1 in (25 mm) at a distance of 100 yd (91 m), which makes moa a convenient unit to use in ballistics calculations. A 5 moa (1.5 milliradian) dot is small enough not to obscure most targets, and large enough to quickly acquire a proper "sight picture". For many types of action shooting, a larger dot has traditionally been preferred; 7, 10, 15 or even 20 moa (2, 3, 4.5 or 6 mil) have been used; often these will be combined with horizontal and/or vertical lines to provide a level reference.

Most sights have either active or passive adjustments for the reticle brightness, which help the shooter adapt to different lighting conditions. A very dim reticle will help prevent loss of night vision in low-light conditions, while a brighter reticle will display more clearly in full sunlight.

Modern optical reflector sights designed for firearms and other uses fall into two housing-configurations: "tubed" and "open".

- Tube sights look similar to standard telescopic sights, with a cylindrical tube containing the optics. Many tube sights offer the option of interchangeable filters (such as polarizing or haze-reducing filters), glare-reducing sunshades, and conveniently protective "flip-up" lens covers.
- Open sights (also known as "mini reflex sights" and "mini red dots") take advantage of the fact that the reflector sight's only optical element, the optical window, does not need any housing at all. This configuration consists of a base with just the necessary reflective surface for collimating the reticle mounted on it. Due to their diminished profile, open sights do not usually accommodate filters and other accessory options typically supported by tube designs.

== Other uses ==
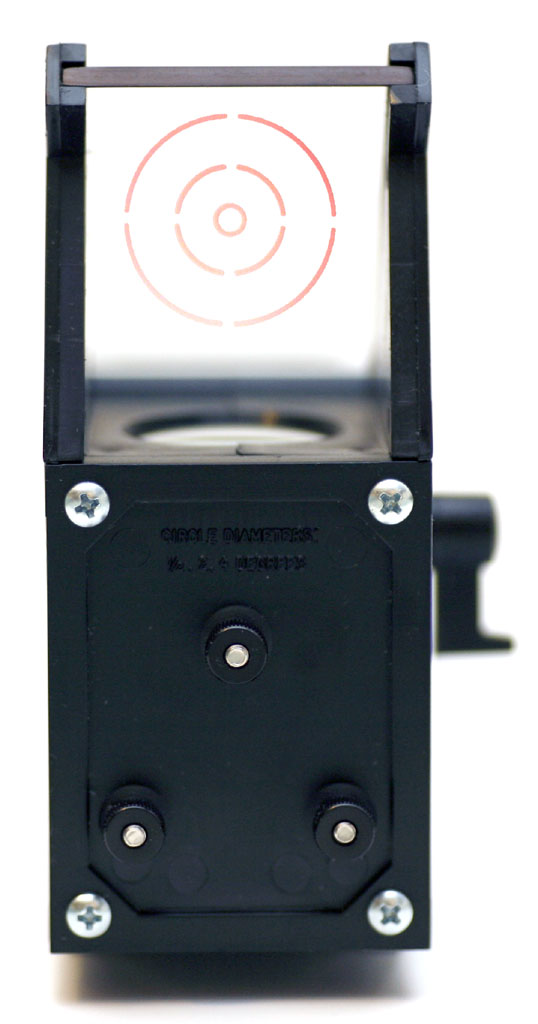
The Telrad, a reflector sight for astronomical telescopes introduced in the late 1970s

Reflector sights have been used over the years in nautical navigation devices and surveying equipment. Albada type sights were used on early large format cameras, "Point and shoot" type cameras, and on simple disposable cameras.

These sights are also used on astronomical telescopes as finderscopes, to help aim the telescope at the desired object. There are many commercial models, the first of which was the Telrad, invented by amateur astronomer Steve Kufeld in the late 1970s. Others are now available from companies such as Apogee, Celestron, Photon, Rigel, and Televue.

Reflector sights are also used in the entertainment industry in productions such as live theater on "Follow Spot" spotlights. Sights such as Telrad's adapted for use and the purpose built Spot Dot allow the spotlight operator to aim the light without turning it on.

== Similar types ==
- Collimator sights (also called collimating or "occluded eye gunsight" (OEG) are simply the optical collimator focusing a reticle without any optical window. The viewer cannot see through them and only sees an image of the reticle. They are used either with both eyes open while one looks into the sight, with one eye open and moving the head to alternately see the sight and then at the target, or using one eye to partially see the sight and target at the same time. The reticle is illuminated by an electric, radioluminescent or passive ambient light source. The Armson OEG and the Normark Corp. Singlepoint are two examples of commercially available ambient lit collimator sights. These sights have the advantage of requiring less illumination for the reticle for the same level of usability, due to the high contrast black background behind the reticle. For this reason occluded eye gunsights were more practical for use on small arms before low power consumption illumination sources such as LEDs became commonplace.
- Holographic weapon sights are similar in layout to reflector sights but do not use a projected reticle system. Instead, a representative reticle is recorded in three-dimensional space onto holographic film at the time of manufacture. This image is part of the optical viewing window. The recorded hologram is illuminated by a collimated laser built into the sight. The sight can be adjusted for range and windage by simply tilting or pivoting the optical window.

== See also ==
- Fire-control system
- Collimator sight
- Holographic weapon sight
- Red dot sight
- Red dot magnifier
- Prism sight, a type of telescopic sight
- Laser sight
- Glossary of firearms terminology
