= Sost =

Sost or SOST may refer to:

== Places ==
- Sost, Afghanistan, a village in Badakhshan Province
- Sost, Pakistan, the last town inside Pakistan on the Karakoram Highway before the Chinese border
- Sost, Hautes-Pyrénées, a commune in France

== Other uses ==
- SOST, a gene that encodes the protein sclerostin
- Söst, Germany
- Special Operations Science and Technology ammunition, see 5.56×45mm NATO § Mk318
- SOST, the ticker symbol for RMS Titanic Inc from 1987 to 2004
- sost. as abbreviation for the sostenuto pedal

== See also ==
- Soest (disambiguation)
