= Susat =

Susat may refer to:

- SUSAT, telescopic sight
- Susat (Rostov Oblast), Russia
- Susart, Isfahan Province, Iran, sometimes romanised as Sūsāt
- Susat, archaic name of several cities called Soest (disambiguation)
