= M145 =

M145 may refer to:

- M-145 (Michigan highway), a Michigan state trunkline highway
- M145 Machine Gun Optic
