= Prism sight =

Type of telescopic sight

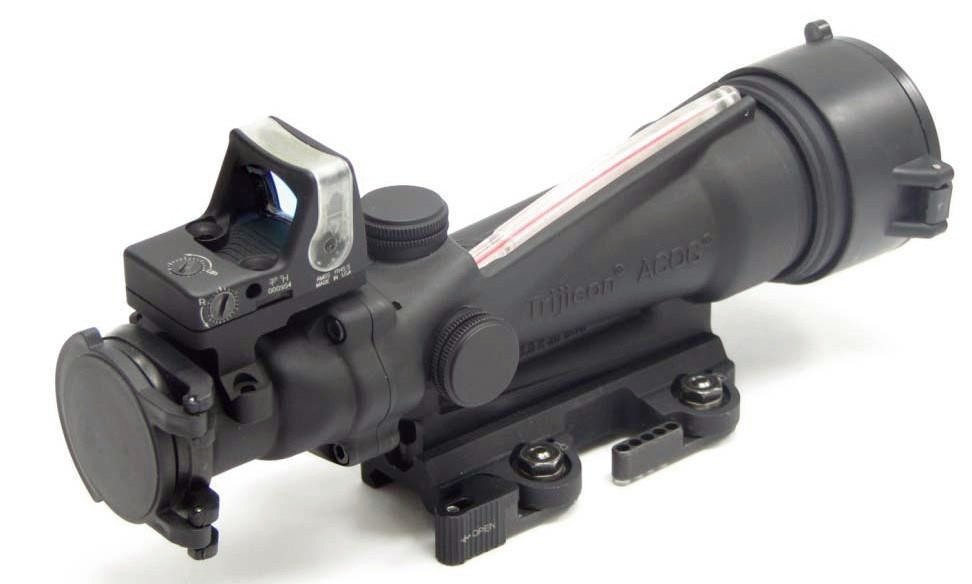
A Trijicon 3.5x35 ACOG prism sight with a Trijicon RMR red dot sight mounted on the top.

A prism sight or prismatic sight, sometimes also called prism scope or prismatic scope, is a subtype of telescopic sight that uses a reflective prism (typically roof prism) mechanism for its image-erecting system, instead of the series of relay lenses found in traditional refractive telescope-based scopes. The use of prisms, which fold and lengthen the optical path via internal reflections, makes it possible to construct a much shorter and lighter sight, or one with an offset between the optical axes of the eyepiece and objective.

== Description ==
The Schmidt–Pechan prism, side view (top) and 3D-view (bottom)

Prism sights are a type of telescopic sight with similar features and limitations. Most prism sights use two roof prisms arranged in a Schmidt–Pechan setup, commonly seen in compact binoculars and spotting scopes. The reticle is etched onto one of the internal reflective surfaces of the prism, making it easy to illuminate the reticle from the back of the prism even when active illumination is turned off.

=== Magnification ===
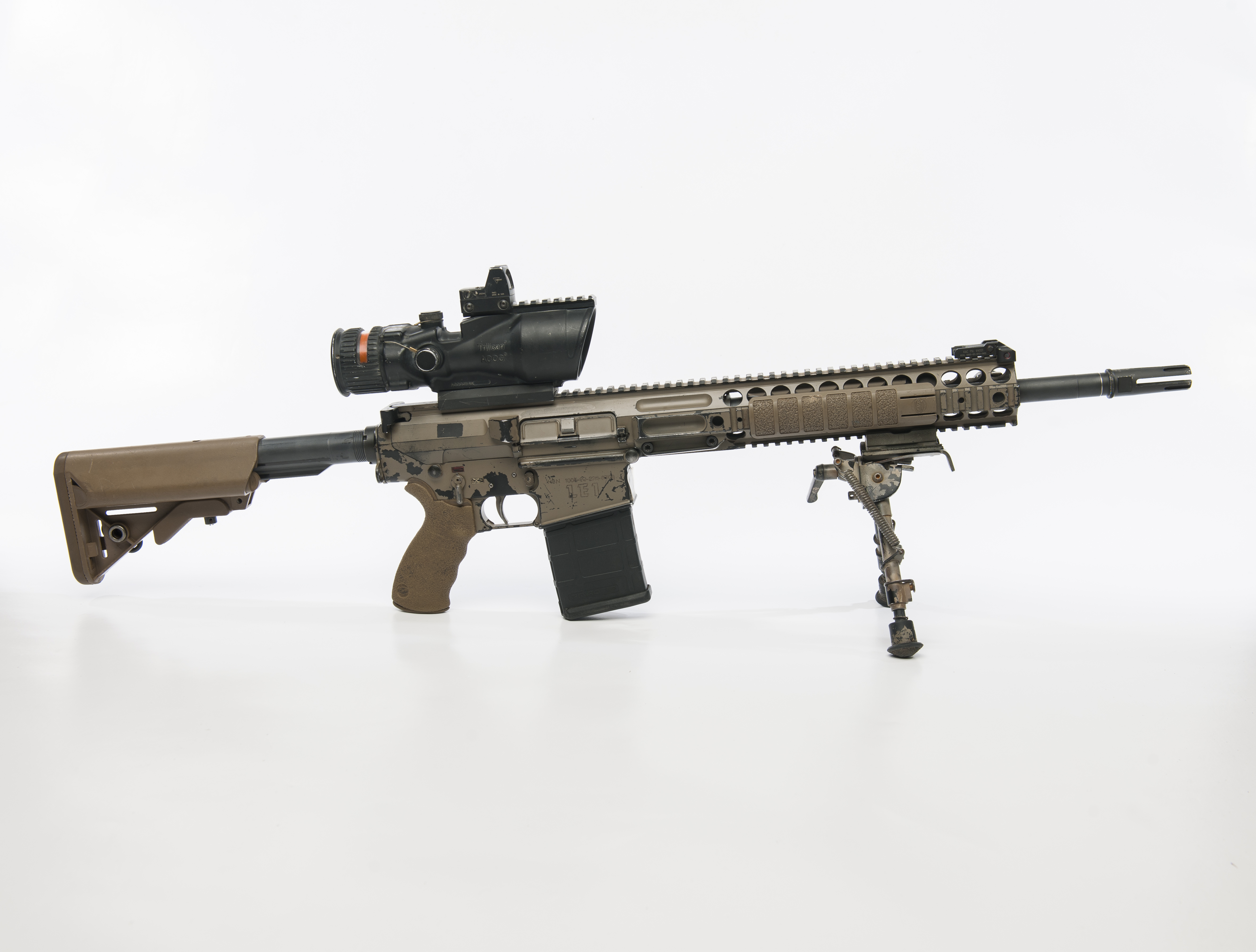
A British L129A1 sharpshooter rifle with a TA648-308 6×48 ACOG fitted

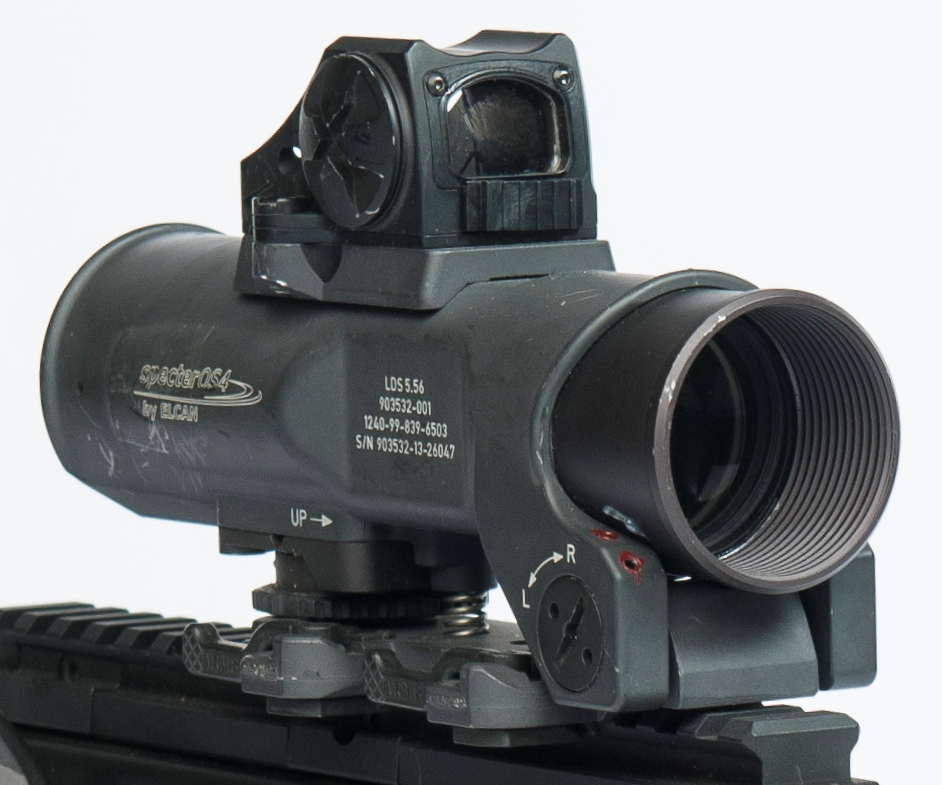
An Elcan SpecterOS 4x prism sight with a Shield Sights reflex sight mounted on top.

Prism sights often have fixed low-power magnification such as 1× (parity magnification or "non-magnifying"), 2×, 3× or 4× magnifications, sometimes 5× or more. Although the low magnification range means fewer visual details—relative to higher magnifications—when observing targets, it allows for larger fields of view; thus, such sights are best-suited for use at short or medium engagement distances.

There are prism sight designs with variable magnification, such as the ELCAN Specter DR/TR series, which use a lever-actuated mechanism to change the focal ratio between the optical components.

=== Reticle ===
Like telescopic sights, prism sights have an etched reticle which makes them suitable for shooters with astigmatism, unlike reflex sights or holographic sights which may be near useless for these shooters depending on the severity of the astigmatism. The reticle is etched on one of the roof prism surfaces and superimposed upon by the target image, and can often be additionally illuminated via LED, optical fiber and/or tritium radioluminescence.

Prism sight reticles can be as simple as a target dot, a circle/inverted horseshoe, a chevron, a small cross or a full crosshair, but etching also make for the possibility to have various graduated lines and reference markings over the target image for more advanced stadiametric rangefinding, which is important for extended-range shooting and artillery spotting. Some prism sights have reticles with pre-calculated markings (typically matched to the external ballistics of a standardized ammunition specification at a number of set distances) known as the ballistic drop compensator (BDC), which can be used for convenient ranging and quick elevation calibrations (i.e. "hold-over") when shooting man-sized targets at different distances.

=== Diopter ===
Prism sights usually have eyepieces with adjustable diopters so that the image can be adjusted for nearsightedness or farsightedness.

=== Parallax ===
Prism sights typically do not have adjustable parallax mechanisms built-in like conventional telescopic sights, as most infantry doctrines only necessitate a hit somewhere in the "vital zone" on a target's torso and thus do not demand extreme accuracy, which would otherwise warrant parallax compensation.

== History ==
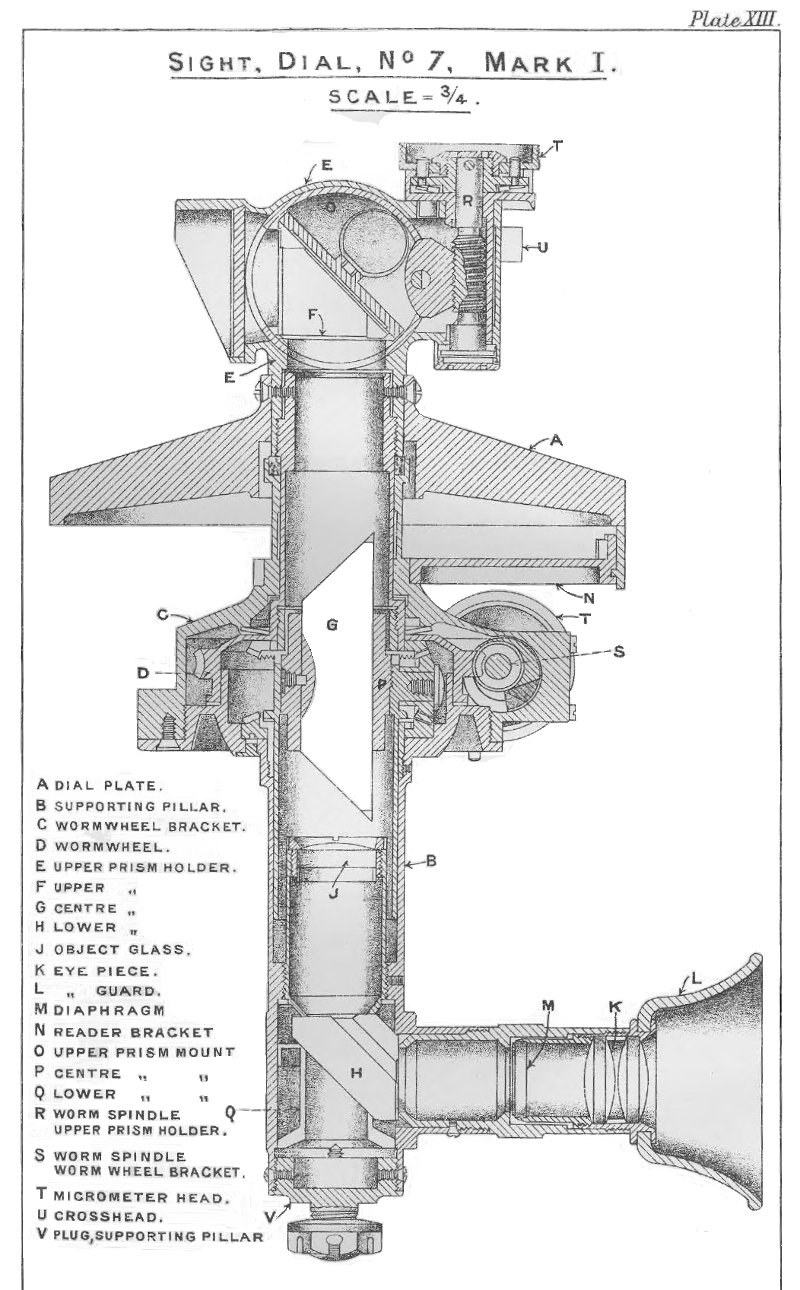
Diagrams showing an interior view of the No. 7 Mark I dial sight for the British QF 18 pounder field gun. Prisms are marked H and F. (cirka 1913)

Prisms have been used in binoculars since the 1890s. During World War I, the US Army chose to equip the M1903 Springfield repeating rifle for the sniper rifle role by mounting a sight similar to half a binocular, a prismatic sight developed by the Warner & Swasey Company. It was a short and compact sight, and the prisms allowed the objective to be angled to the side so that the 1903 rifle could be loaded with a clip from above. It was still possible to use the iron sights with the scope mounted.

The M1908 version of the scope had 6-times magnification, while the later M1913 version had slightly less magnification at 5.2×. The background for choosing a lower magnification was a larger field of view and improved light transmission. The sight was constructed of steel and brass, was painted black inside for optical performance, and had a relatively high mass of 1,020 g (36 oz). The eye relief was only 38 mm (1.5 in), so the sight was equipped with a rubber eyepiece shield to prevent the scope from hitting the face during recoil. The reticle was a thin crosshair, as was common for this time period.

These sights were fitted to the Hotchkiss M1909 Benét–Mercié machine gun. Canadian Forces ordered 500 samples of the 5.2× variant. Moisture on the inside of the lenses was one of several problems in the field, and the scope was known to loosen. In total, approximately 8,000 units of these prismatic sights were produced. The scope sight had the greatest magnification of the First World War, but in return only had a 4.5 degree field of view.

The 2.5x Carl Zeiss “Glasvisier 16” bifocal scope was designed for use in low light conditions that would work in conjunction with a clip-on Zeiss front cover sight post with a luminous white painted triangle. The top point of the triangle is used similar to a front sight post by lining it up with the top edge of the magnified lower section of the rear scope lens.

A well-known later example is the fixed-magnification Trijicon ACOG which has been used in combat by the US Marine Corps, US Army and USSOCOM.

In the 2010s, several manufacturers including Trijicon, and Vortex began offering prism sights on the consumer market.

In October 2019, the Chinese QBZ-191 automatic rifle was revealed at the 70th Anniversary National Day military parade. It has a 3× daylight prismatic sight called QMK152 and QMK-171A.

== See also ==
- Red dot sight, usually referring to a reflex sight with a red dot, but sometimes a holographic sight or prism sight
- Low-power variable optic, a variable-zoom telescopic sight with magnification range from 1x to no more than 10x
