= SUIT (sight) =

Rifle sight

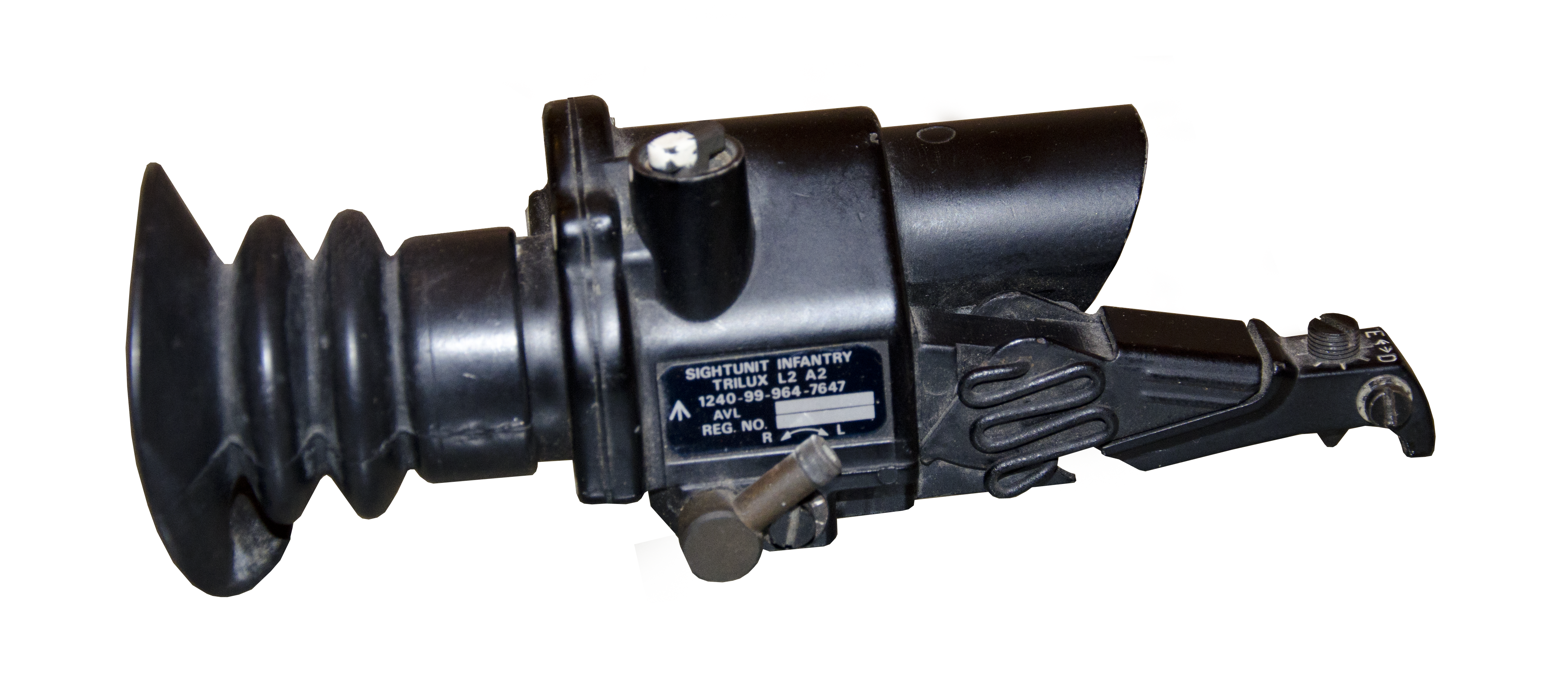
L2A2 SUIT sight with its selection lever in its 500 meters (forward) setting

The SUIT sight is a 4× prism sight with tritium-powered illumination, utilised at dusk or dawn. The full name is the L2A2 Sight Unit Infantry Trilux. The sight is not designed as a sniper sight, but as a standard issue infantry sight to improve the infantryman's night fighting capability and to assist target identification at long range in daylight and in poor light conditions.

The sight was mounted on the L1A1 Self-Loading Rifle or GPMG. The SUIT sight was developed in the United Kingdom by Royal Armaments Research Development Establishment (RARDE) and is manufactured by Avimo Ltd., now known as Thales UK. It was first produced in 1976 by Avimo Ltd. in London and is regarded as an early optical combat sight.

The SUIT sight was an optional optical sighting system for the British Army's L1A1 Self-Loading Rifle and was also used by the Australians and New Zealanders. It was used in modest numbers by British servicemen during The Troubles in Northern Ireland and the Falklands War of 1982.

A similar unit known as the SUSAT( Sight Unit Small Arms, Trilux) was fitted to the later SA80 series weapons.

== L1A1 mounting system ==
The FN FAL from which the L1A1 Self-Loading Rifle was derived was not designed for mounting optical sights like the SUIT. To mount the SUIT, a new top cover was designed. This had a rail welded to the top to accept the sight mount, and two tabs at the rear of the pressed sheet steel cover which butted against the back of the upper receiver, preventing the cover from sliding on its rails and affecting the weapon's zero. The custom top receiver cover rail mounting causes an offset of the optical sight axis to the left side in relation to the receiver and barrel center axis. This prismatic offset design of the sight helped to improve clearance around the action, reduce the overall length of the sight, parallax errors and heat mirage from the barrel as it heated up during firing. The mounting system was technically complex as it combined interfaces between the rifle and the top cover and the rail and the SUIT sight unit itself.

Sight adjustment was performed on the front of the SUIT unit base for elevation and on the right bottom side for windage.

== Range setting feature ==
The SUIT sight features a Bullet drop compensation (BDC, sometimes referred alternatively as ballistic elevation). The range setting feature consists of a selection lever to select a pre-determined zero cam for 300 metres (328 yards) (rear setting) or 500 metres (547 yards) (forward setting) range. The feature is tuned only for the ballistic trajectory of a particular gun-cartridge combination with a predefined projectile weight/type, muzzle velocity and air density.

== Reticle ==
The reticle of the SUIT sight is of unusual design. Unlike the traditional crosshair layouts commonly used, which are in essence a cross intersecting the target, the SUIT has a single obelisk-shaped post protruding from the top edge of the sight so as not to obscure the target. The reticle is tritium-illuminated for low-light condition aiming. The Trilux radioactive tritium illuminator light source produces a red glow, that can be selected and brightness adjusted on the top of the unit and has to be replaced every 8–12 years, since it gradually loses its brightness due to radioactive decay.

== Body ==
The SUIT sight has an aluminium body, into which the eyepiece, objective lens and prisms are fitted as assemblies.

== Specifications ==
SUIT L2A2

- Overall dimensions: (L x W x H): 188 x 76 x 69 mm
- Weight: 340 grams
- Magnification: 4×
- Field of view: 8 degrees (140 mils)
- Objective diameter: 25.5 mm
- Exit pupil: 6.375 mm
- Eye relief: 35 mm
- Light permeability: 86%
- Reticle illumination: Red tritium, glass ampoule
- Illumination strength: Adjustable
- Tritium ampoule lifetime: 8–12 years
- Range Settings: 300 meters (rear) or 500 meters (forward).
- NATO Stock Number (NSN): 1240-99-964-7647 (Sight Unit Infantry Trilux (SUIT) L2A2)

== See also ==
- SUSAT
- 1P29
