= ELCAN Specter =

Multi-role prism sights created and manufactured by Raytheon ELCAN Optical Technologies

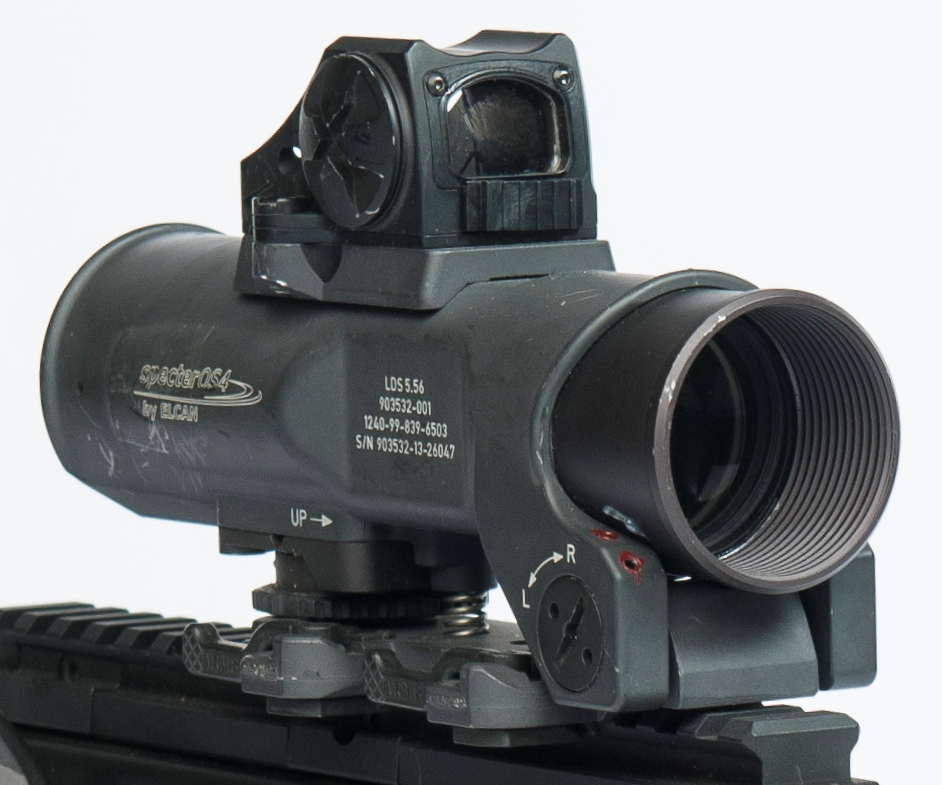
Specter OS 4×

The ELCAN Specter is a line of multi-role prism sights created by Raytheon ELCAN Optical Technologies originally designed for M16/M4 family of rifles but now also exists for light machine gun and heavy machine guns. Most of the optics are capable of switching between magnifications and illumination.

== History ==
The Specter was developed by Raytheon Six Sigma Product Development Team under Raytheon ELCAN Optical Technologies for the United States Naval Surface Warfare Center to fill the requirement for the "SOPMOD rifle kit SU-230/PVS Articulated Telescope NSN 1240-01-533-09039", development was started in 2003 with the goal to fix the general issue of transition between long-range engagements/operation to short range engagement/operations(CQB) that would leave the soldier vulnerable while switching optics. The solution found by ELCAN was to merge a telescopic sight with a red dot sight by using a rotating lens one side at 1× magnification the other in 4× that could be rotated by the turn of a lever. Development was finished in 2006 where it won the bid 9–1 and was adopted as the SU-230/PVS. Since then more models have hit the market, such as the stripped-down Specter OS line developed as a cheaper alternative to the more expensive DR line developed for SOCOM, which lacks the capability to switch magnification, making it function more as standard prism sight.

== Reticle ==
The optic has two standard reticles: both are a cross, feature a range finder out to 600 m (656 yd) for 5.56×45 and 800 m (875 yd) for 7.62×51, where they differ is in the bulletdrop design, where the one called CX5395/CX5396 uses circles to denote the range, while the other called CX5455/CX5456 uses lines and also features lines for windage.

The OS line features two different reticles: one is the SFOV4-C1 similar to the CX5455 except featuring a "+" as the center of the reticle, the other reticle for the OS line is an ACOG-like type reticle with a chevron in the middle known as CX5755.

== Operation ==
The optic is fitted to the rifle with A.R.M.S. locking levers to a normal Picatinny rail (MIL-STD 1913 rail) 70 mm (2.8 in) from the shooter eye. The optic is zeroed at 100 m (109 yd) range the azimuth/windage is adjusted in ½ MOA increments by flathead screwdriver on the front right of the optic and the elevation is adjusted in ½ MOA increments on the elevation zero dial at the back of the optic. The elevation zero dial has to be unlocked before it can be adjusted. The optic is capable of illumination; it can be turned on as a red dot or it can illuminate the entire reticle for night use. Illumination is turned on by turning the illumination dial on the left of the optic, and the battery is located within the dial itself.

If the optic is a dual-role (DR) model it has a lever in the middle that can be depressed and then pushed/pulled to switch between two set magnifications.

The Tri-Role (TR) is the more unique optic in the line, although operation remains mostly the same, except the changing of the magnification now happens on the dial on the left of the optic; it can only have a red dot as illumination, and features a different mounting solution.

== Dimensions ==
Specter DR 1–4×

- Length × width × height = 153 × 74 × 78 mm
- Weight = 660 g
- Magnification = 1×–4×
- Field of view = 26 degrees at 1×, 6.5 degrees at 4×
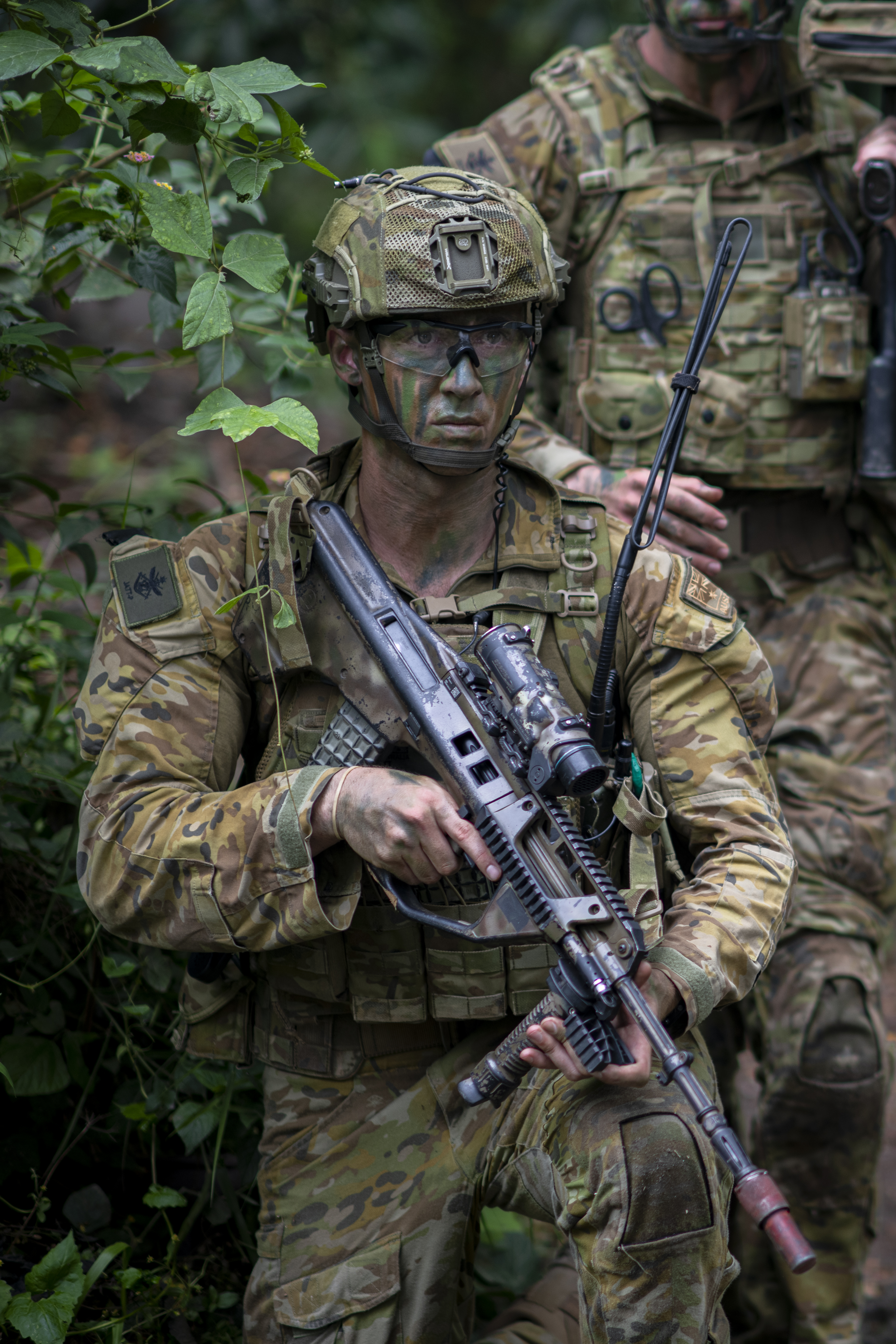
  Australian soldier with a Specter DR 1–4× mounted on his EF88
- Entrance pupil diameter = 32 mm
- Exit pupil diameter = 8 mm
- Eye relief = 70 mm

Specter DR 1.5–6×

- Length × width × height = 183 × 75 × 73 mm
- Weight = 705 g
- Magnification = 1.5×–6×
- Field of view = 16 degrees at 1.5×, 4 degrees at 6×
- Entrance pupil diameter = 42 mm
- Exit pupil diameter = 7 mm
- Eye relief = 70 mm

Specter TR 1-3–9×

- Length × width × height = 265 × 81 × 74 mm
- Weight = 850 g
- Magnification = 1×–3×–9×
- Field of view = 16 degrees at 1×, 6 degrees at 3×, 2 degrees at 9×
- Entrance pupil diameter = 12 mm at 1×, 30 mm at 3×, 30 mm at 9×
- Exit pupil diameter = 11.7 mm at 1×, 10 mm at 3×, 3.33 mm at 9×
- Eye relief = 70 mm

== Variants ==
=== Fixed magnification sights ===
- Specter OS 4×
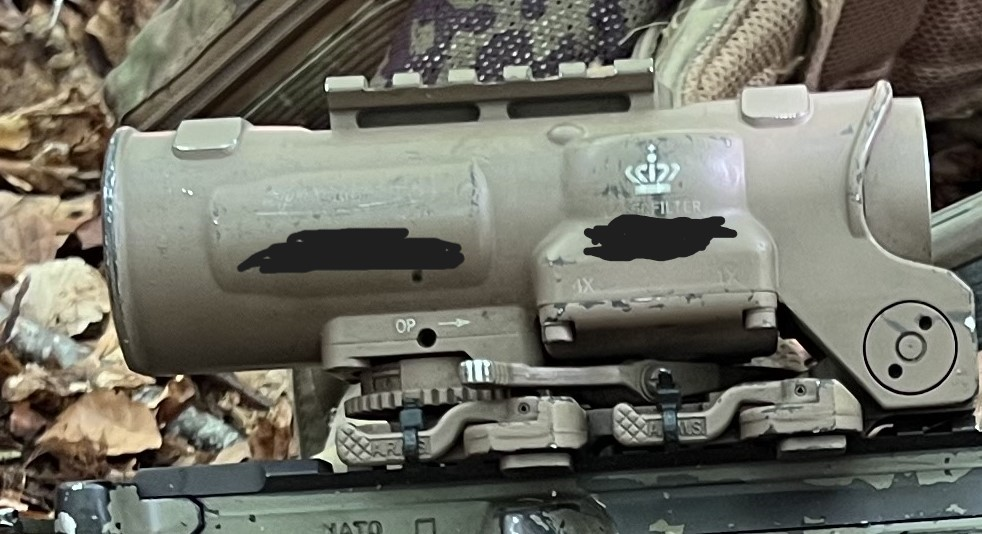
- Danish Spectre DR 1–4× 5.56
  Specter OS 6×

=== Multi-Role sights ===
- Specter DR 1–4×
- Specter DR 1.5–6×
- Specter TR 1-3–9×

=== Reflex sights ===
- Specter HR Heavy Reflex Sight

=== Digital sights ===
- Specter DFCS

=== Close-quarters sight ===
- Specter 1XL

=== Custom sights ===
- Danish DALO Specter DR 1–4× 5.56 (addition of ambi lever and a modified CX5755 reticle)
- Danish DALO Specter DR 1–4× 7.62 (addition of ambi lever and a modified CX5756 reticle)
- Danish DALO Specter DR 1.5–6× 12.7 (addition of ambi lever and a modified CX5756 reticle)
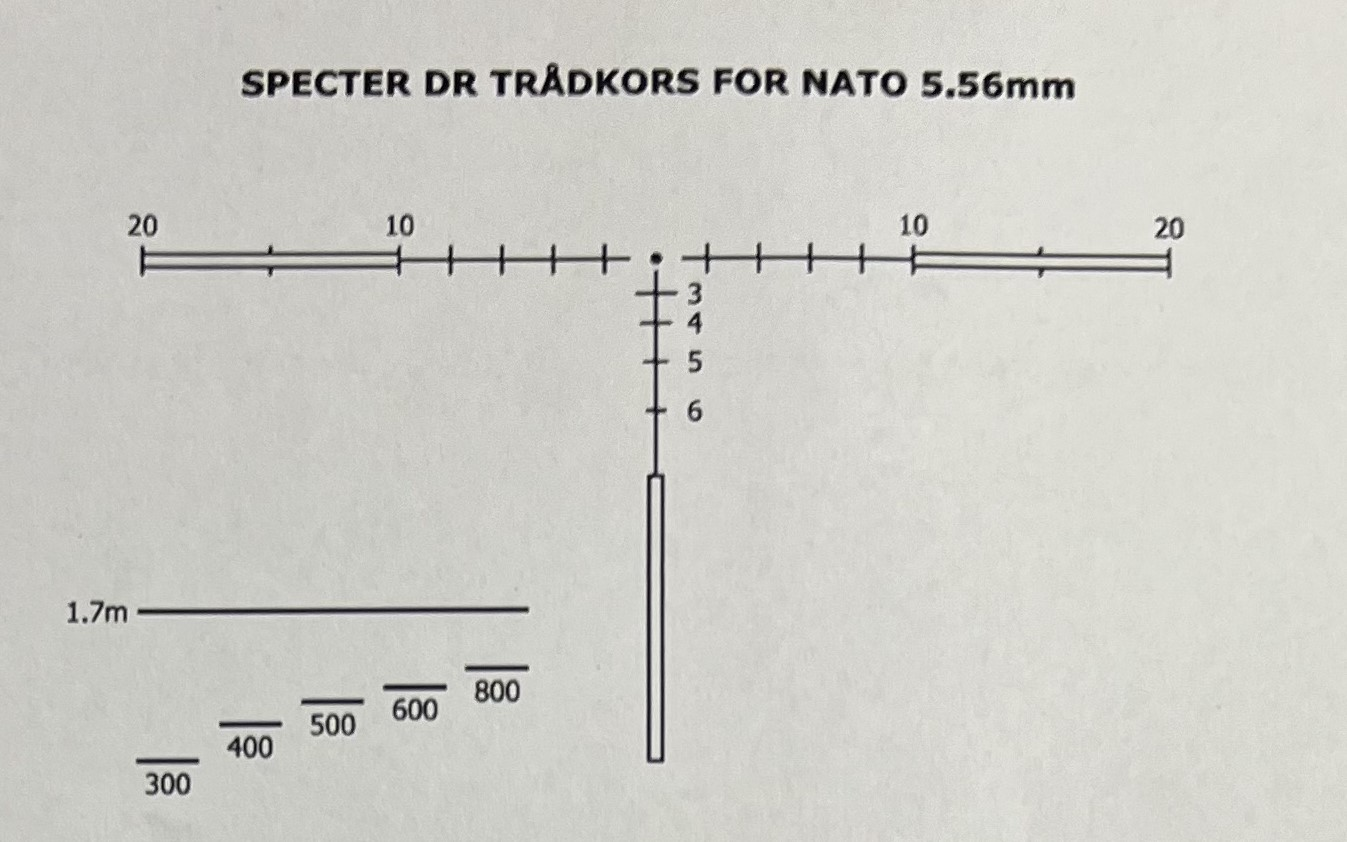
Danish 5.56 Reticle

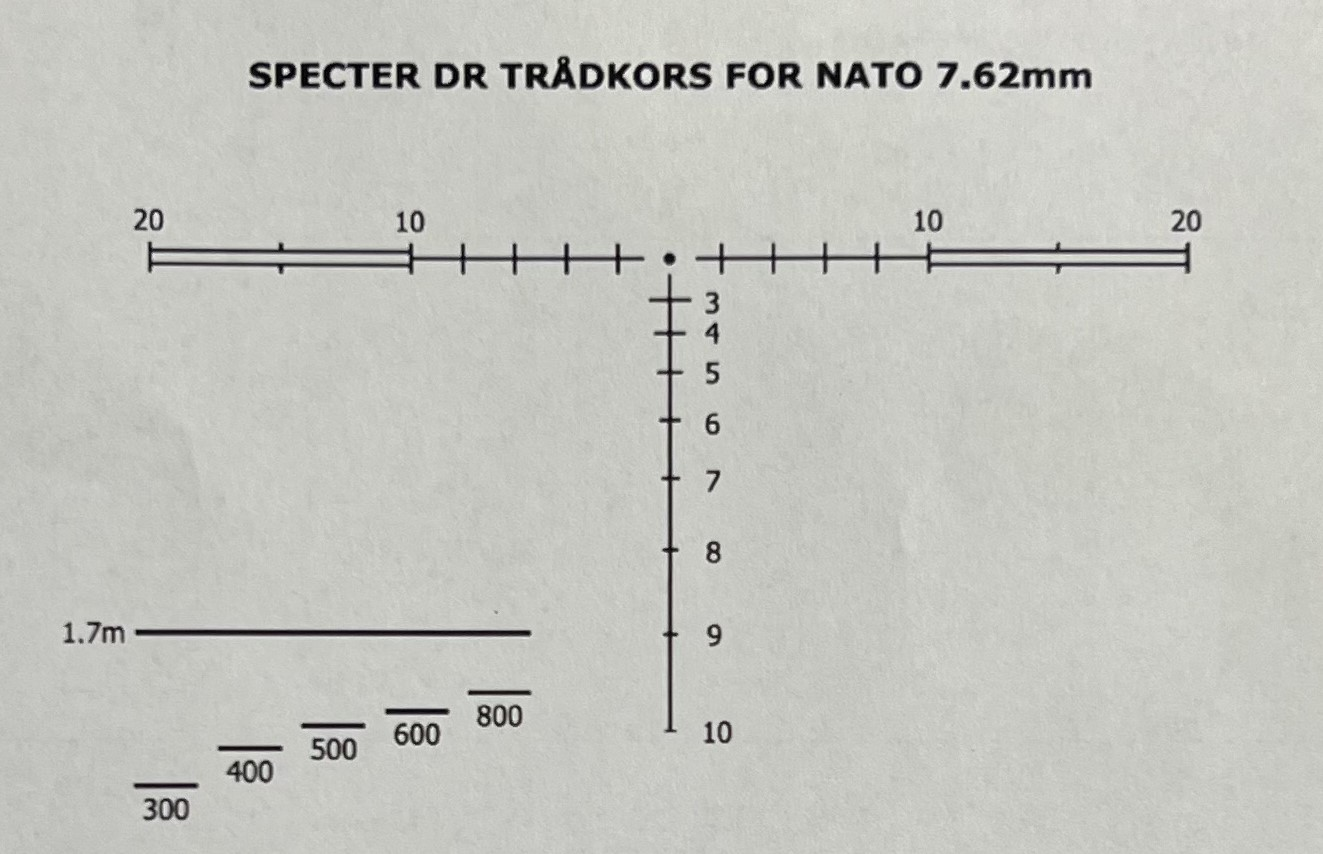
Danish 7.62 Reticle

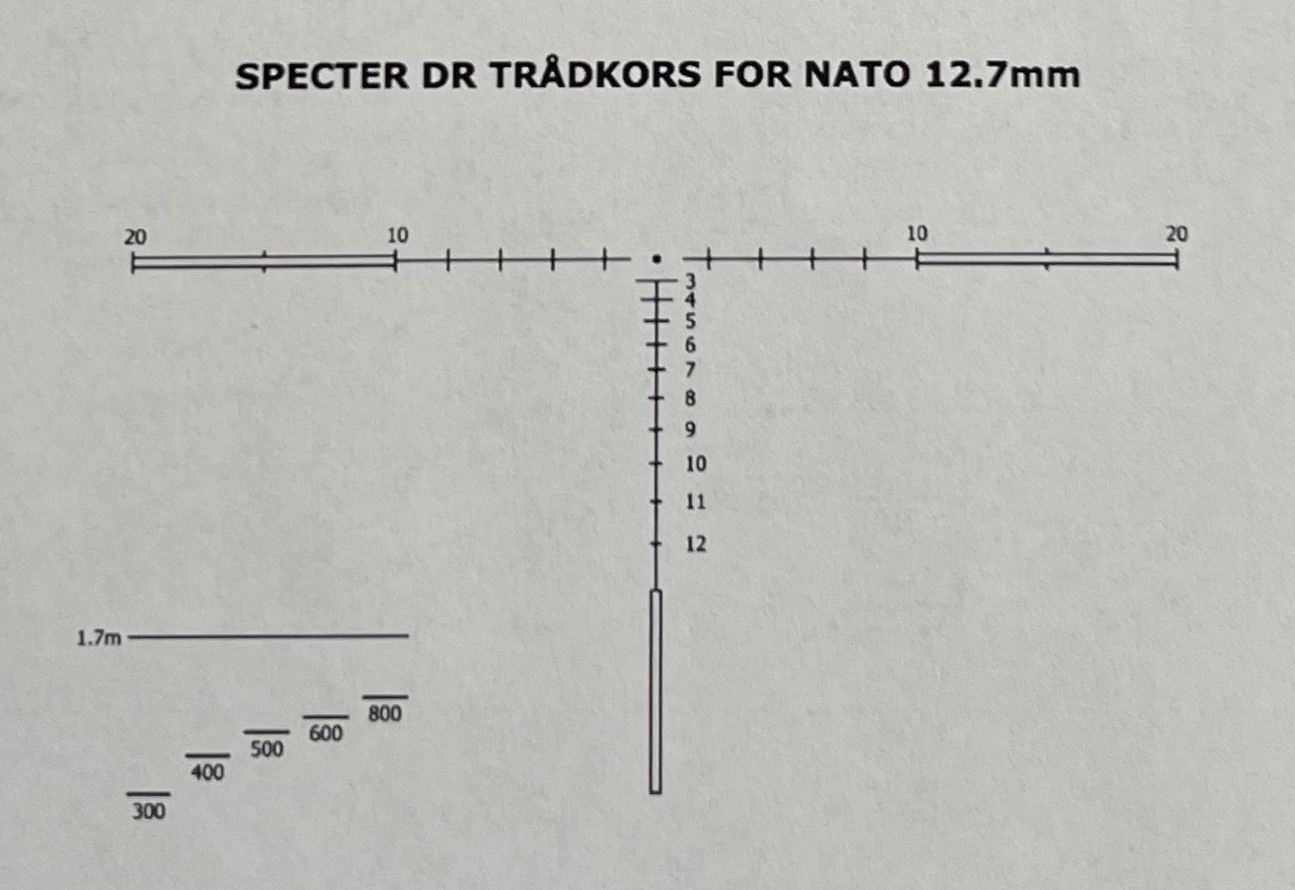
Danish 12.7 Reticle

== Users ==
=== Current users ===
- Afghanistan: Some captured by the Taliban from ANA forces during the pull out of Afghanistan.
- Australia: The Australian Defence Force adopted the Specter DR 1–4× in 2016.
- Canada: Used by Canadian Special Operations Forces Command.
- Chile: The Chilean Army adopted the Specter OS 4× in 2014.
- Croatia: Used by Croatian Special Operations Forces Command.
- Denmark: Hæren adopted three custom versions developed jointly between DALO and Elcan in 2020. The models picked where the Specter DR 1–4× for 5.56, Specter DR 1–4× for 7.62 and the Specter DR 1.5–6× for 12.7 as all with a unique reticle and was adopted as a replacement for the ageing C79.
- Germany: The Bundeswehr adopted the Specter DR 1–4× in 2021 to be delivered by Leonardo.
- Italy: Manufactured by Leonardo on a licence, used by the Italian military.
- Lithuania: Manufactured by Meopta under license for the Lithuanian Army.
- Norway: Hæren uses the Specter DR 1–4×.
- Serbia: Specter DR 1-4× adopted by Detachment of the Military Police for Special Operations "Cobras" and 72nd Brigade for Special Operations
- United States: SOCOM adopted the Specter DR 1–4× as part of SOPMOD Block II and designated SU-230/PVS.
- United Kingdom: The British Army adopted the OS 4× and designated it as the LDS in 2013.

=== Former users ===
- Afghanistan: ANASOC were supplied with SOPMOD Block II by the United States that included the SU-230/PVS(Specter DR 1–4×).

== See also ==
- SUSAT
- Advanced Combat Optical Gunsight (ACOG)
- C79
