= Holographic weapon sight =

Type of gunsight

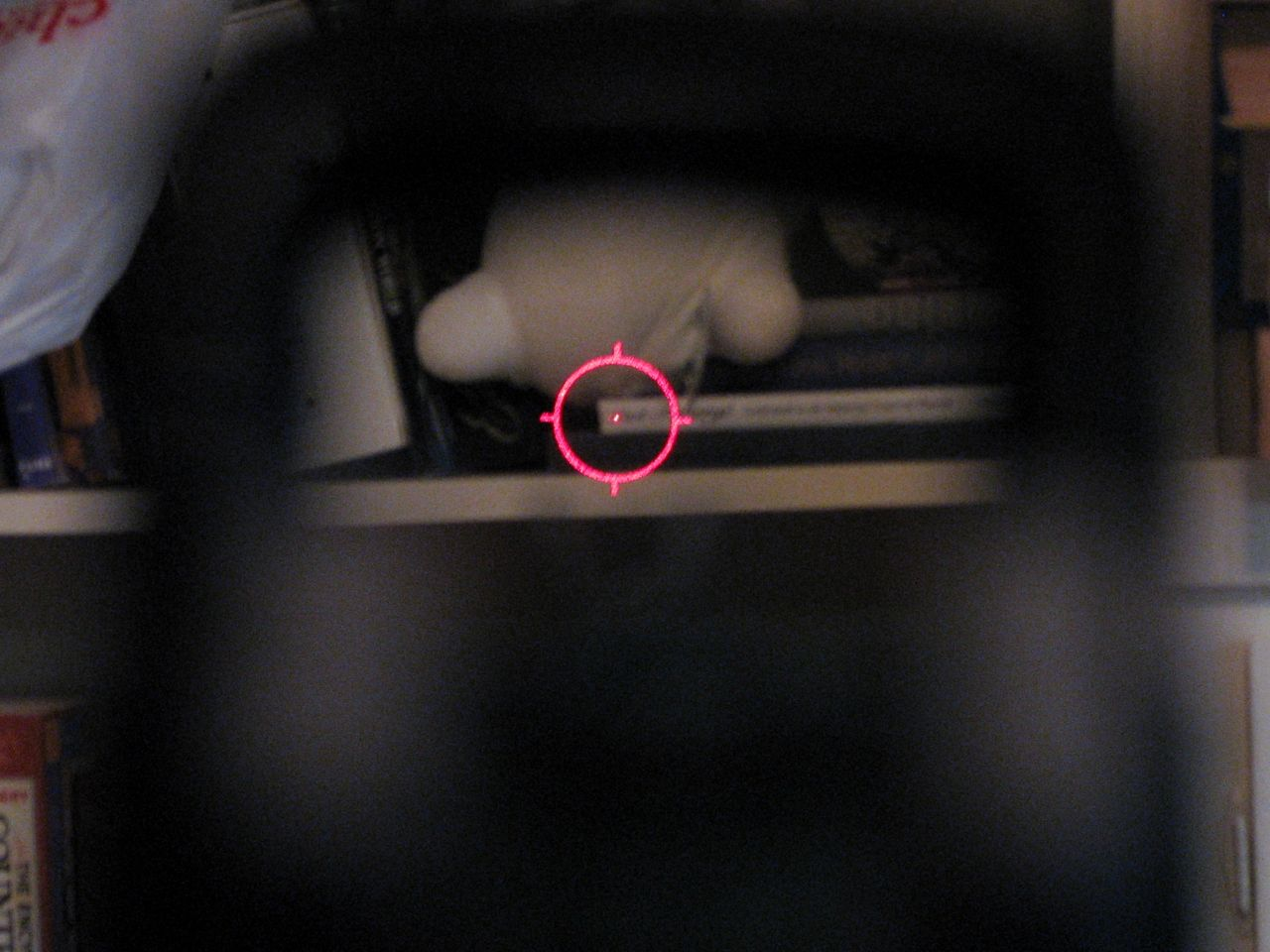
A view through an EOTech 512 holographic weapon sight.

A holographic weapon sight or holographic diffraction sight is a non-magnifying gunsight that allows the user to look through a glass optical window and see a holographic reticle image superimposed at a distance on the field of view. The hologram of the reticle is built into the window and is illuminated by a laser diode.

== History ==
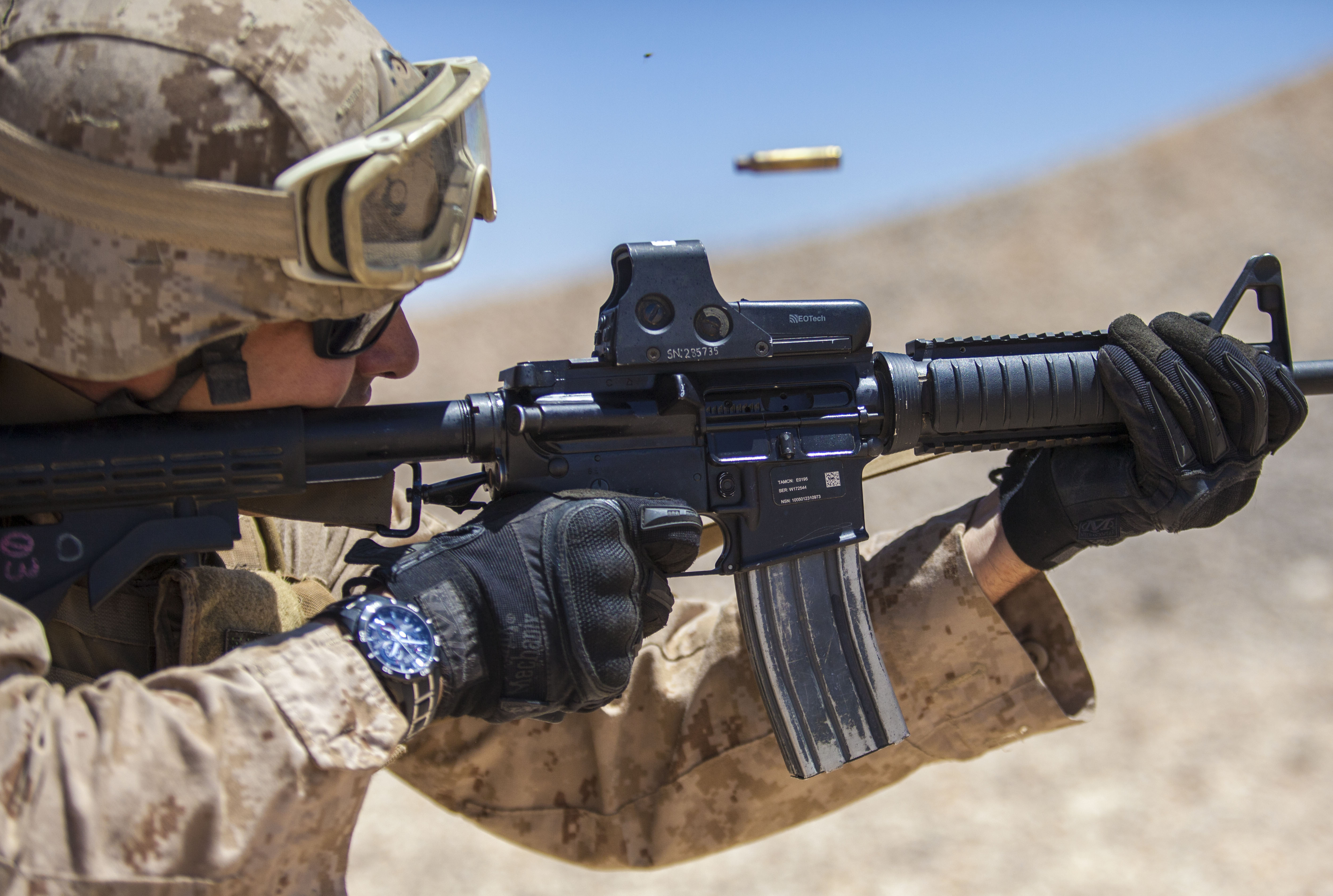
A United States Marine firing an M4 carbine, using an EOTech holographic sight to aim.

The first-generation holographic sight was introduced by EOTech—then an ERIM subsidiary—at the 1996 SHOT Show, under the trade name HoloSight by Bushnell, with whom the company was partnered at the time, initially aiming for the civilian sport shooting and hunting market. It won the Optic of the Year Award from the Shooting Industry Academy of Excellence.

EOTech was the only company that manufactured holographic sights until early 2017, when Vortex introduced the Razor AMG UH-1 into the market as a competing product. As Vortex introduced the Gen II model on mid July, 2020 which later replaced the original UH-1. In 2025, DOT (Dynamic Optronic Technologies) entered the holographic sight market with the release of the EHS-1, adding another competitor to the field.

== Design ==
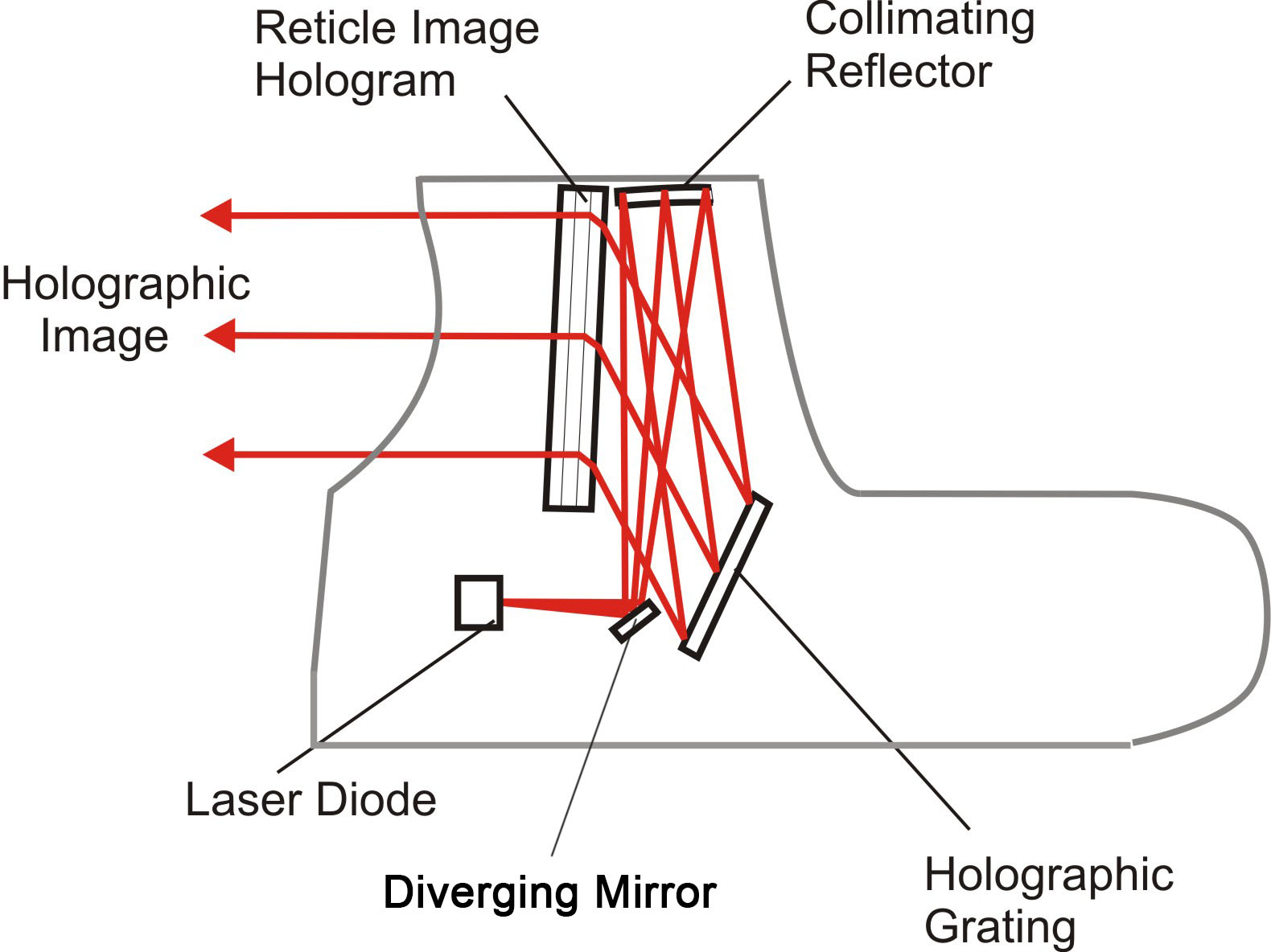
Internal light path of EOTech holographic sights.

Holographic weapon sights use a laser transmission hologram of a reticle image that is recorded in three-dimensional space onto holographic film at the time of manufacture. This image is part of the optical viewing window. The recorded hologram is illuminated by the collimated light of a laser diode built into the sight. The sight can be adjusted for range and windage by simply tilting or pivoting the holographic grating. To compensate for any change in the laser wavelength due to temperature, the sight employs a holography grating that disperses the laser light by an equal amount but in the opposite direction as the hologram forming the aiming reticle.

The optical window in a holographic weapon sight looks like a piece of clear glass with an illuminated reticle in the middle. The aiming reticle can be an infinitesimally small dot whose perceived size is given by the acuity of the eye. For someone with 20/20 vision, it is about 1 minute of arc (0.3 mrad).

Holographic sights can be paired with "red dot magnifiers" to better engage farther targets.

== Working Principle ==
A laser diode pulses a concentrated laser beam of light onto a convex diverging mirror, this spreads out the beam into a wider surface area. The diverged beam lands onto a collimating reflector, this reflects and blocks light along unwanted paths, causing only a parallel column of light to land on the holographic grating. The holographic grating is a blazed diffraction grating designed to diffract only the particular required wavelength of light correctly onto the reticle image hologram glass. The reticle image hologram thus receives collimated light, filtered by the diffraction grating to specific wavelength.

The workings of transmission holography is briefly explained, as required to understand how the collimated light that falls upon the reticle image hologram will diffract to finally produce the holographic image seen by the viewer. The reticle image hologram is a piece of photo-sensitive glass that has been burned with holographic diffraction gratings due to the interference of a reference beam and the source beam. The reference beam used for the burn is equivalent to the aforementioned collimated light landing on the reticle image hologram. The source beam is light that is sourced from the reference beam (via a beam-splitter) that takes an alternative path, reflecting off a reticle-shaped object (perhaps 100 yards away) and finally incident upon the reticle image hologram. Once the diffraction grating is burned, the source beam can be removed. With just the original reference beam incident onto the reticle image hologram, the newly formed diffraction gratings on the glass diffracts the reference beam light in such a manner that the viewer perceives it as light from the original source beam. The viewer, no matter the eye position (as long as he is looking at the reticle image hologram), will see diffracted light that apparently originates from the original object position.

== Parallax error ==
Like the reflector sight, the holographic sight is not "parallax free", having an aim-point that can move with eye position. This can be compensated for by having a holographic image that is set at a finite distance with parallax due to eye movement being the size of the optical window at close range and diminishing to zero at the set distance, usually around the target range of 100 yards.

== Compared to reflector sights ==
=== Light transmission ===
Since the reticle is a transmission hologram, illuminated by a laser shining through hologram presenting a reconstructed image, there is no need for the sight "window" to be partially blocked by a semi-silvered or dielectric dichroic coating needed to reflect an image such as in standard reflex sights. Holographic sights therefore have the potential for better light transmission than reflector sights.

=== Manufacturing costs ===
Holographic sights are considerably more expensive than red dot sights, due to their complexity as well as there being only two manufacturers of holographic sights.

=== Size ===
Holographic sights are generally bulkier than reflex sights and require a rifle to mount, while red dot sights have been made small enough to fit handguns.

=== Battery life ===
Holographic sights have shorter battery life when compared to reflex sights that use LEDs, such as red dot sights. The laser diode in a holographic sight uses more power and has more complex driving electronics than a standard LED of an equivalent brightness, reducing the amount of time a holographic sight can run on a single set of batteries compared to a red dot sight, around 600 hours for typical holographic sights, compared to sometimes up to tens of thousands of hours for red dot sights. For example, the Vortex Razor AMG UH-1 holographic sight has been quoted as having an expected battery life of 1,000 to 1,500 hours (1½ to 2 months) on medium setting. The Aimpoint CompM5s red dot sight has an expected battery life of around 8,000 to 50,000 hours (1 to 5 years) depending on the setting.

== See also ==
- Fire-control system
- Collimator sight
- Reflex sight
- Laser sight (firearms)
- Prism sight, a type of telescopic sight
- Glossary of firearms terminology
- Glossary of military abbreviations
- List of laser articles
