= EOTech =

American electro-optic company

EOTECH, LLC
- Type: Private
- Industry: Optics
- Founded: 1995
- Headquarters: Plymouth, Michigan, U.S.
- Key people: Joseph Caradonna, Christopher Kouza, Dean Loebig
- Products: Holographic and Close Quarters Battle firearm sights, Riflescopes
- Parent: Koucar Management (2020–present)
- Website: www.eotechinc.com

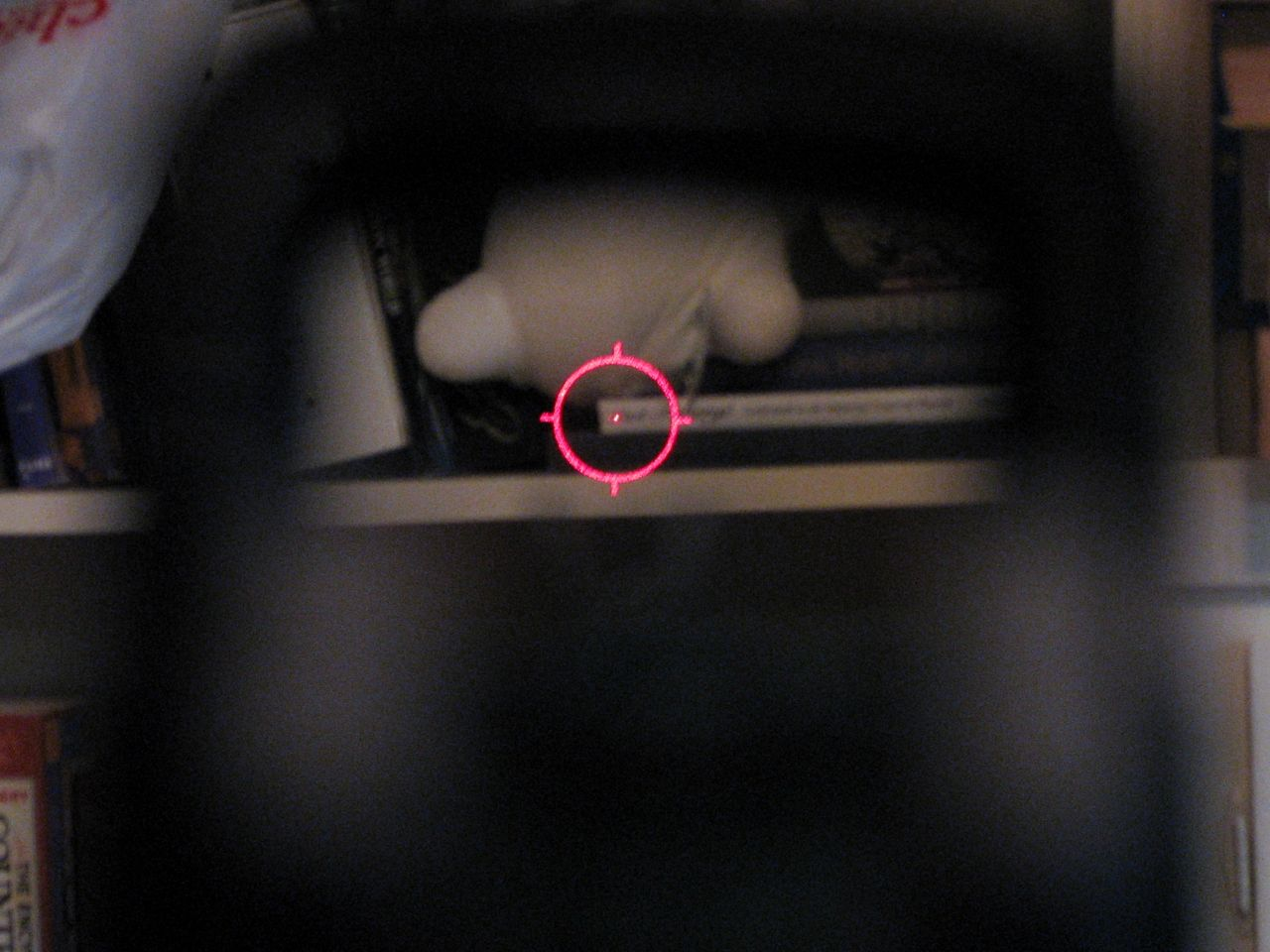
View through an EOTECH 512 holographic weapon sight.

EOTECH is an American company that designs, manufactures, and markets electro-optic and night vision products and systems. The company is headquartered in Plymouth, Michigan.

They produce holographic weapon sights for small arms that have been adopted by various military and law enforcement agencies as close quarters battle firearm sights.

They also have roots in the Environmental Research Institute of Michigan (ERIM), a not-for-profit R&D institute. ERIM researchers have made advancements in the fields of synthetic aperture radar, laser holography, and aircraft head-up displays.

== Products and services ==
EOTECH manufactures holographic weapon sights, magnified optics, and night vision sensors. EOTECH was the first company to create holographic sights, having addressed wavelength instability exhibited by laser diodes. They introduced their first-generation holographic weapon sight at the 1996 SHOT Show, which won the Optic of the Year Award from the Shooting Industry Academy of Excellence. Their second-generation holographic weapon sight was released in 2000 and won the same award in 2001. They developed achromatic holographic optics that compensate for any change in the emission wavelength of the laser diode with temperature. The sights are designed to be mounted on small arms via a MIL-STD-1913 Picatinny or Weaver rail, and powered by either AA, N or CR123 size batteries for up to 1,100 hours of runtime. Sights display either a 65 MoA ring with a 1 MoA dot in the center, a single 1 MoA dot, a vertical series of dots for bullet drop compensation in certain calibers, or, in the case of their less-lethal sights, a flared vase-like sight to assist in the aiming of bean-bag or rubber ball rounds commonly used in riot control. Bushnell marketed the non-military versions under the brand name "Holosight". The EOTECH 553 is in U.S. military service under SU-231/PEQ and M553 in the commercial market. More recently, the U.S. Military has also purchased and issued the newer EOTECH EXPS3 model, the SU-231A/PEQ. The U.S. military has also accepted a specialty sight for the grenade launcher with the SU-253/PEQ. Their first holographic sight was introduced in January 1996.

== Criticism and controversy ==
In 2015, the U.S. government sued EOTech's former parent company, L-3, for civil fraud, accusing it of covering up defects in the sights it knew about as early as 2006. The first defect was "thermal drift", which causes the aiming point to shift in high or low temperatures by as much as 12" at 300 yards. The second was "moisture incursion" or "reticle fade", which causes the viewing glass to fog up and the aiming point to lose brightness. L-3 settled for $25.6 million and fixed the "moisture incursion" defect. There was no report of a cure for the thermal drift defect. Thousands of L3's sights are used by federal law enforcement and military, including special operations forces.

== Corporate affairs ==
In 2018, EOTECH was awarded a $26.3 million five-year contract from the U.S. Special Operations Command (USSOCOM) to provide close-quarters sights and clip-on magnifiers for the Miniature Aiming System–Day Optics suite.

In 2020, EOTECH officially separated from L-3 Technologies and was purchased by Project Echo Holdings dba American Holoptics, a subsidiary of Koucar Management.

In 2021, EOTECH acquired the Photonics division of Intevac.

== Technology ==
Unlike reflector sights, the holographic weapon sight does not use a reflected reticle system. Instead, a representative reticle is recorded in three-dimensional space onto holographic film that is part of the optical viewing window. Like the reflector sight, the holographic sight's reticle uses collimated light and therefore has an aim point that can move with eye position. This is compensated for by having a holographic image set at a finite distance, in this case, around 100 yards. The sight's parallax due to eye movement is the size of the optical window at close range and diminishes to zero at the set distance.

To compensate for any change in the laser wavelength, the EOTECH sight employs a holography grating that disperses the laser light by an equal amount but in the opposite direction as the hologram forming the aiming reticle. The result is a reticle that is stable with the temperature change.

One requirement of holographic projection is a laser. Lasers use more power and more complex driving electronics than an LED of an equivalent brightness, reducing the amount of time a holographic sight can run on a single set of batteries.

== See also ==
- Aimpoint
- ELCAN
- Trijicon
