= C79 optical sight =

Small arms telescopic sight

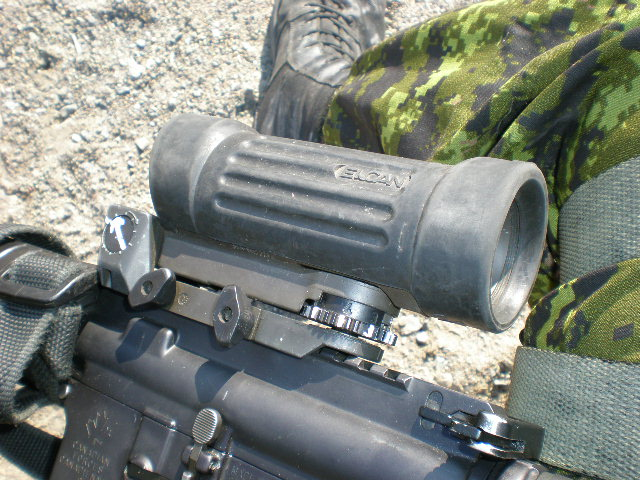
C79 optical sight

The C79 optical sight (SpecterOS3.4×) is a telescopic sight manufactured by Elcan. A variant, the M145 Machine Gun Optic is in use by the US military. It is 3.4×28, meaning 3.4× magnification, and a 28 mm diameter objective lens. A tritium illuminated reticle provides for normal and low-light conditions sighting. It can be mounted to a variety of rifles and light machine guns using the Picatinny rail mounting system or the similar Diemaco rail system found on small arms produced by Diemaco/Colt Canada. Similar rifle sights are the Sight Unit Small Arms, Trilux (SUSAT) and the Advanced Combat Optical Gunsight (ACOG).

== Use ==
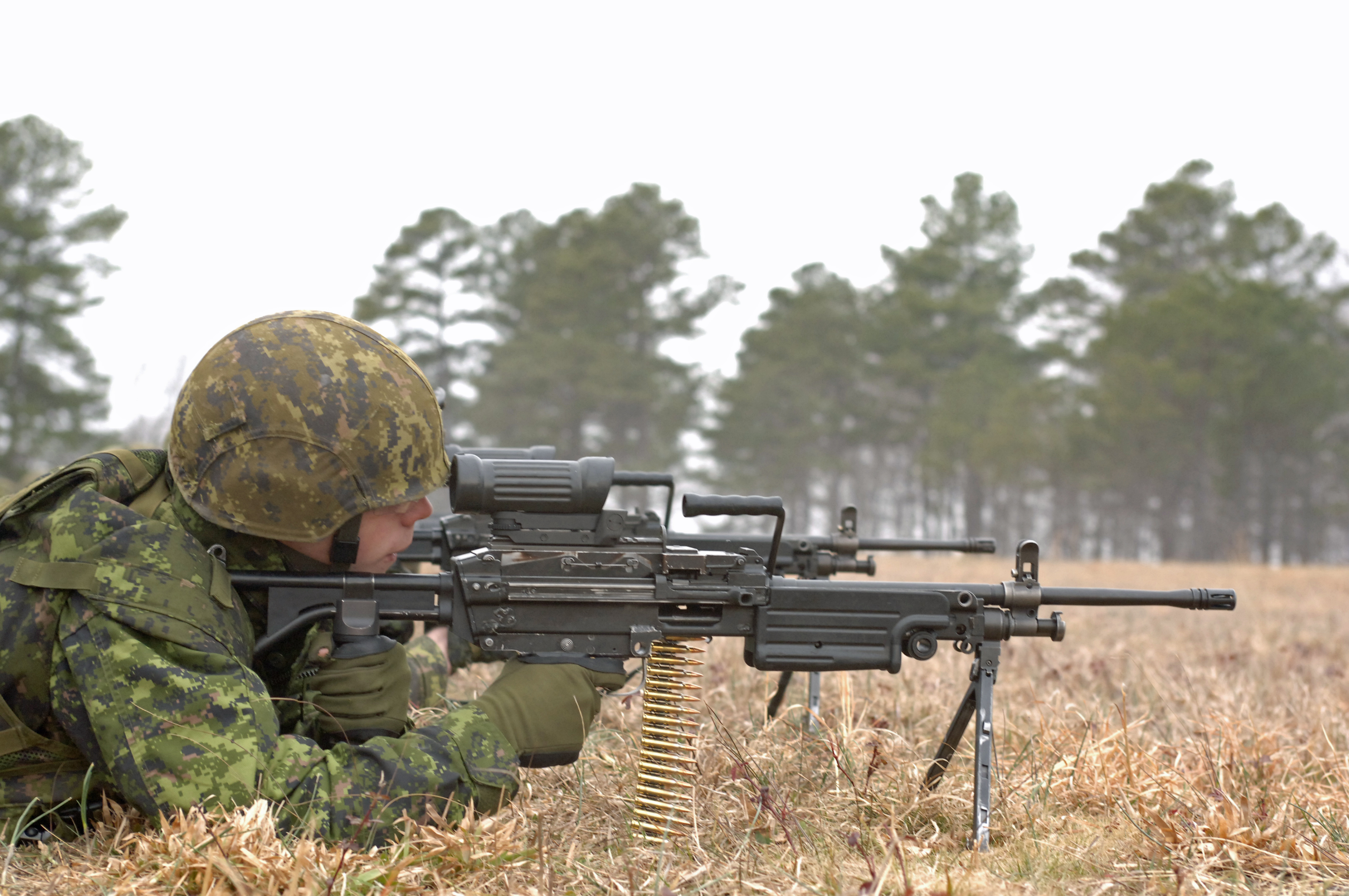
Canadian soldiers training with C9A1 light machine guns equipped with a C79

Adopted in 1989, the Elcan C79 is the primary sighting system for the small arms of the Canadian Forces and is mounted on the Colt Canada C7 and C8 family of rifles, as well as the C9A1 Light Machine Gun. It is also used in the armies of Denmark, the Royal Netherlands Army, the Netherlands Marine Corps, and the Norwegian Armed Forces.

In Canadian service, all C7A1 and C7A2 rifles come equipped with a C79 sight as standard. The C7A1 uses a C79 sight, which is easily distinguished by its matte black rubber overcoating. After reviewing feedback from the soldiers who used the sight, Elcan produced the fourth generation mount C79, known as the C79A2, and is mounted onto the C7A2 rifle, as well as the C8A3 carbines. The C79A2 sight is a component of the C7A2 mid-life update program of the Canadian Forces' inventory of C7A1 rifle systems. The older rifles and sights are meant to be exchanged 1:1 and brought to the C7A2 standard.

In Dutch service, it is used on the Colt Canada C7 (regular infantry), C7A1 (airmobile infantry) and C8, FN Minimi and FN MAG series of firearms.

== Reticle ==
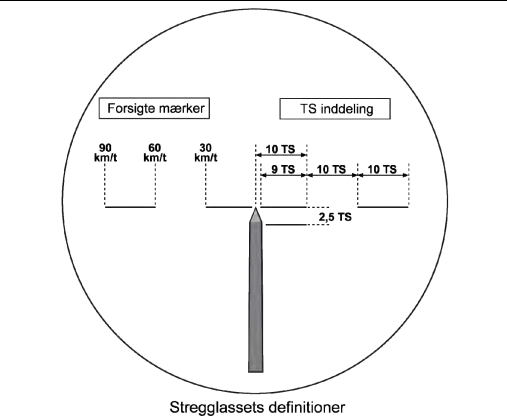
C79 Reticle as shown in the declassified danish manual of arms HRN 111-00 for the M95 family of rifles (C7, C8 and C8IUR)

The reticle of the C79 sight was designed to serve on the C9 Light Machine Gun, thus an appropriate pattern was chosen to aid the gunner in judging distance. The reticle consists of a single vertical post with a sharp tip in the center. The tip is flanked by horizontal Mil-bars on either side. Under the left-hand Mil-bar, a second horizontal bar was added for judging distances, where the distance between the two bars would equate to 76 cm at 300 m. The (radioactive) tritium light source is an unstable isotope with a half-life of 12.32 years that gradually loses its brightness due to radioactive decay. It is to be replaced every 8 to 12 years to maintain adequate brightness.

== Operation ==
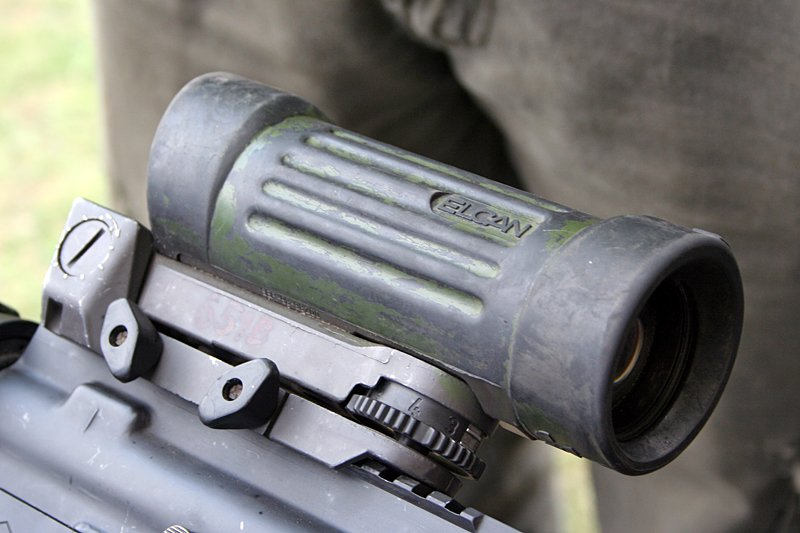
C79 3.4×28 sight adjustment controls

The C79 sight is attached to a mounting rail on the receiver of the weapon. On Canadian Forces weapons, this is in the form of a modified Weaver rail, also known as a "Diemaco rail". Two adjustment knobs are used to secure the base to the receiver. A bore-sighting device is usually used to roughly zero the sight before a first-time shooter takes it to the range. Adjustments come in 0.25-mil clicks (one mil equals 10 cm at a range of 100 m, so each click adjusts the sight by 2.5 cm at 100 m). Sighting in a C79 sight is normally done at a range of 200 m. Windage adjustments are made on the left hand side of the base, using a flat object such as a flat-head screwdriver or a coin. The windage adjustment is intended only for the initial sighting in procedure of the C79. Elevation adjustments are made via a rotary knob and are adjusted from 200 to 800 m. To bring the sight to a proper elevation zero, a small "gate" must be elevated which disconnects the elevation cam and one mil clicks can now be made. For precise shooting, the gate is usually left open to allow for finer adjustments than the rougher presets. Target shooters will sometimes mark pre-established open gate adjustments with whiteout pens to remind them how many clicks must be made for each range. At close ranges, when rapid aiming is required, the emergency battle sights on top of the sight can be used, although they are very crude and only intended for use inside of 75 m.

It has been noted that the external adjustments mount is an achilles heel of the C79 as it can be jammed by foreign matter and also adds to the weight of the sight.

== Dimensions ==
- Length × Width × Height = 165 × 57 × 86 mm
- Weight = 690 g
- Magnification = 3.4×
- Field of View = 8 degrees (14.1 m @ 100m)
- Entrance Pupil Diameter = 28 mm
- Exit Pupil Diameter = 8.5 mm
- Eye Relief = 70 mm

== Variants ==
=== C79A2 ===
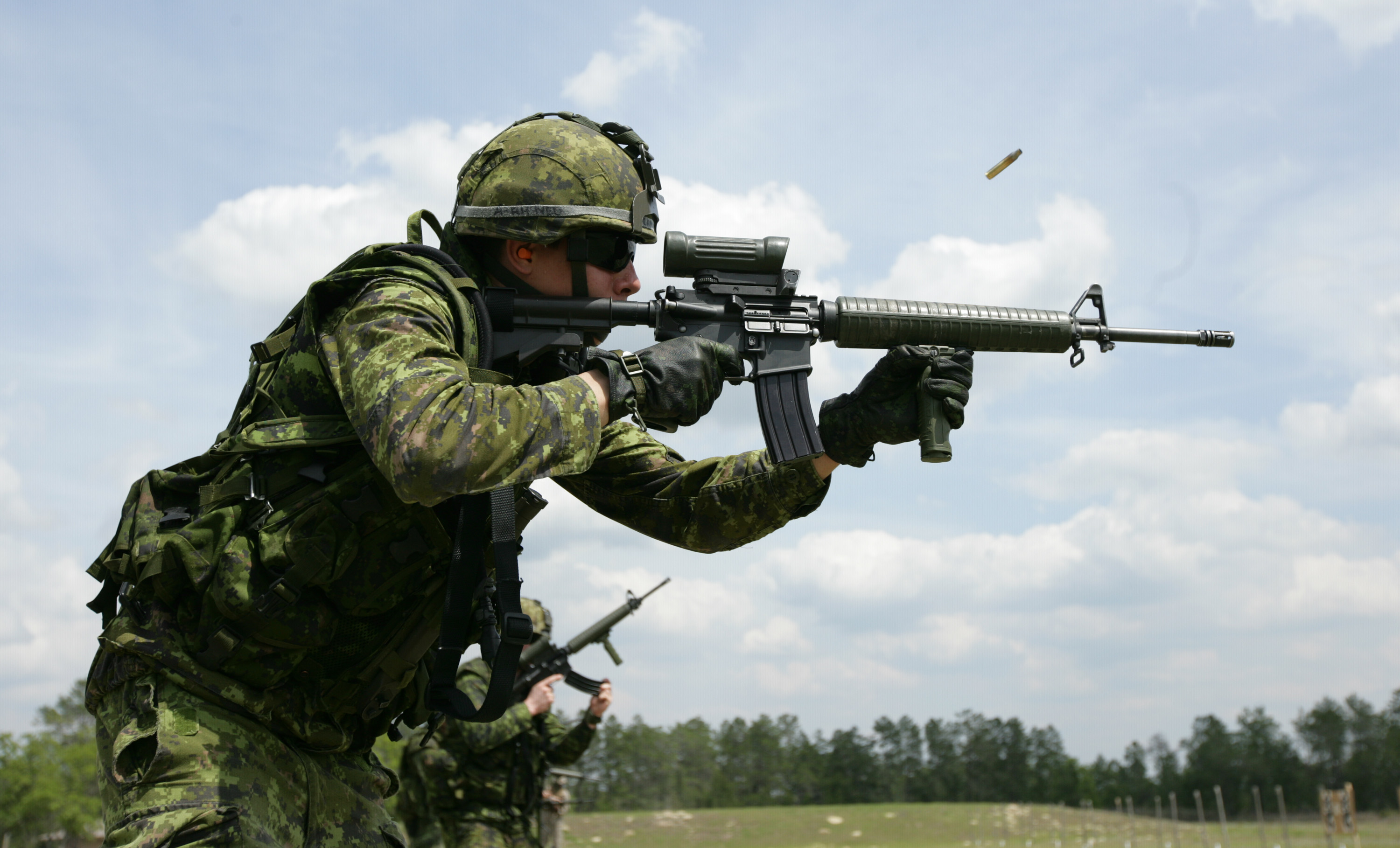
A Canadian soldier fires the C7A2 rifle with a C79A2 sight.

The current issue model features an improved mounting system for better return to zero. The C79A2 has a green rubber armored cover to help the optic blend in with the Canadian CADPAT uniform. The A2 series is the optics mid life upgrade for the C7A2 program as the tritium needs to be replaced every 8 to 12 years of service."C79A2" is engraved on the left side of the optic mounting base. This model is used on C7A2 rifles and C8A3 carbines. The United States also uses this optic on some of its M4 Carbines. Versions of this optic are made available for the civilian market from Armament Technologies in Nova Scotia, Canada.

=== M145 Machine Gun Optic ===
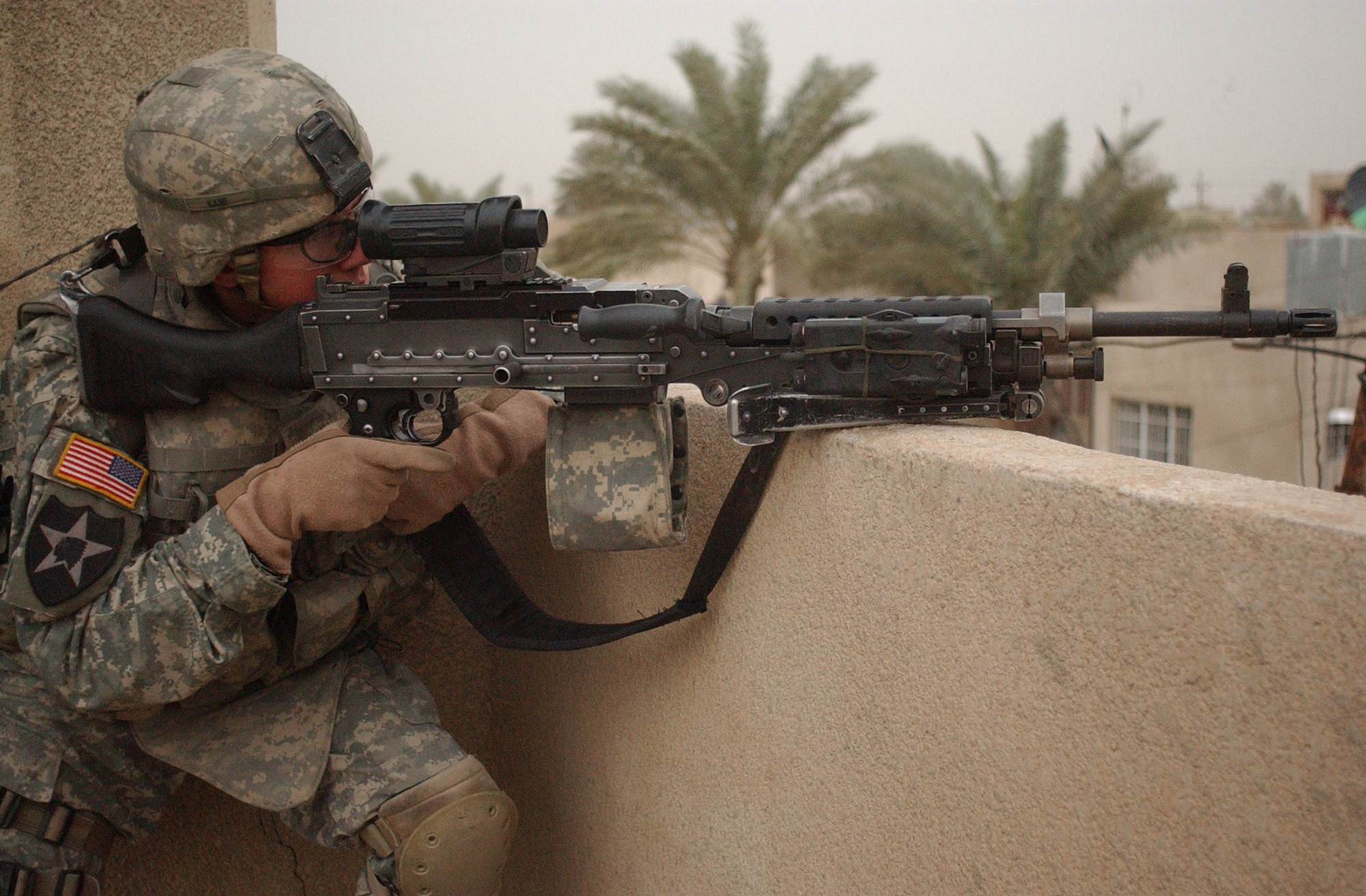
M145 Machine Gun Optic fitted to a M240B machine gun.

The M145 Machine Gun Optic is a variant of the C79 that was developed for the U.S. Army and is commonly mounted on M240 and M249 machine guns. The M145 is unusual when compared with other optical sights in use with the United States military in that ballistic compensation is in the mount, rather than in the reticle. The reticle is illuminated by a battery-powered LED with varying intensity settings. The mount fits directly to any MIL-STD-1913 Picatinny rail or receiver. Zero is retained despite repeated removal and re-attachment to the weapon. The M145 is extremely resistant to shock and water immersion and has an anti-reflection device and rubber lens caps. The M145 also uses a unique reticle system designed for machineguns wherein there is no single particular crosshair zeroed at a certain distance but instead the sight uses several smaller crosshairs that are marked with specific distances. The machinegun's projectile ballistics are zeroed to match these specific distances so that users can quickly engage targets at extended ranges without having to adjust the sight.

=== M145 M4 Optic ===
The M145 M4 is a variant of the M145 Machine Gun Optic with a 'M4' reticle that is optimized for use on the M4 Carbine, M16 rifle and derivatives. Aside from the reticle, it is the same mechanically and optically as the M145 Machine Gun Optic.

=== Danish C79 LMG Optic ===
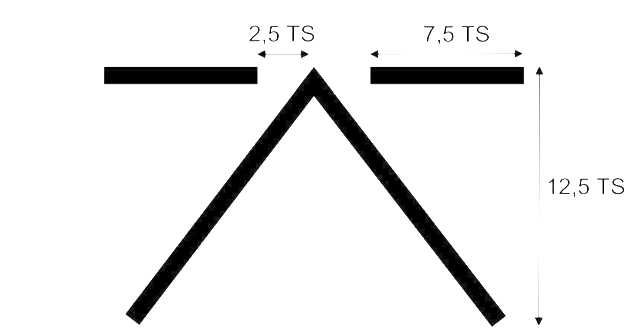
Reticle from the declassified danish manual of arms HRN 111-107 for the MG3

An optic designated as M/98 for the Danish M/62 and later M/60E6 7.62×51mm NATO machine guns. It is mounted on top of the receiver and can be set from 300 to 800 meters (328 to 875 yd) in 100 meters (109 yd) increments. What sets it apart from the standard C79 is its unique reticle of a chevron with a height of 12.5 TS and 2 TS line left and right with a length of 7.5 TS beginning 2.5 TS away from the tip of the chevron. The sight designated as M/99 os also available in a night vision configuration.

== Users ==
=== Current users ===
- Canada C79
- United States M145
- United Kingdom M145
- Belgium M145
- Ukraine C79

=== Former users ===
- Australia uses Steyr AUG A1 and A2 sights along with Elcan Spectre 1-4×DRs
- Denmark replaced by the Elcan Spectre 1-4×DR in 2021
- France replaced by Elcan Spectre 1-4×DR
- Netherlands replaced by an Aimpoint CompM4 magnifier combo
- Norway replaced by Elcan Spectre 1-4×DR and Aimpoint CompM4s
- New Zealand replaced by ACOGs

== See also ==
- SUSAT - The British Armed Forces' universal sight.
- Advanced Combat Optical Gunsight (ACOG) - The United States Armed Forces' common equivalent of the C79.
- Specter - Successor to the C79
