= SUSAT =

British firearm optic

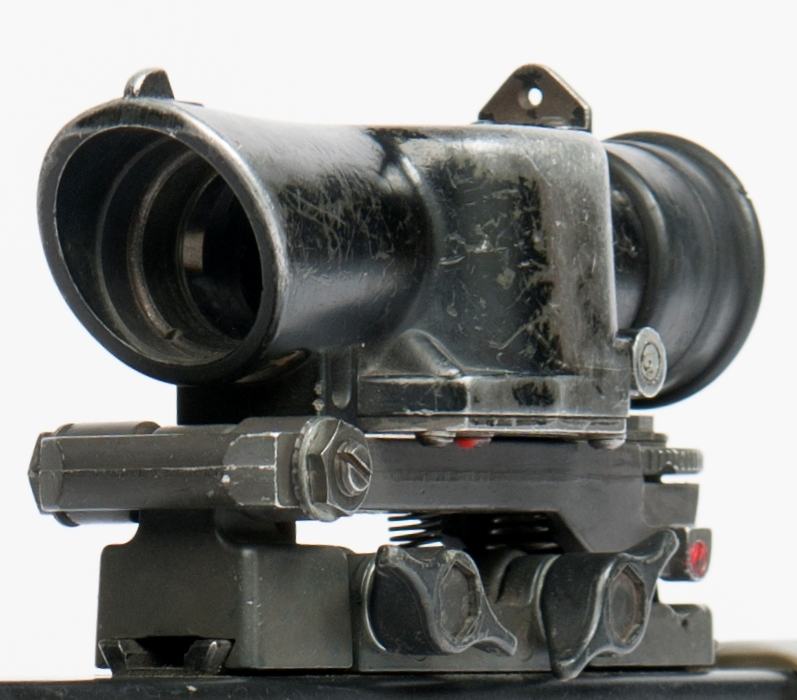
Trilux Small Arms Sight Unit

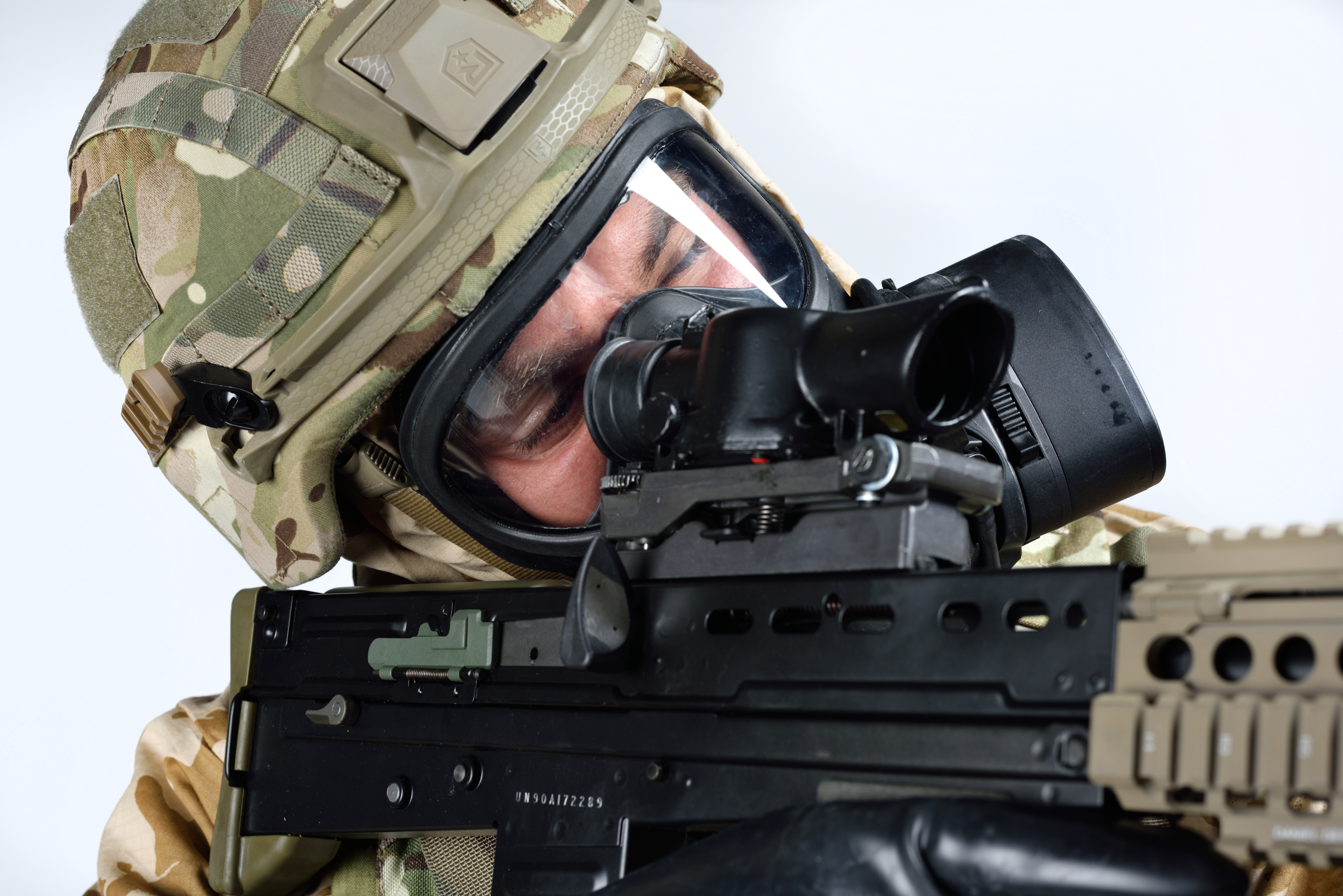
Sight attached to an L85A2

The Sight Unit Small Arms, Trilux, or SUSAT, is a 4× telescopic sight, with tritium-powered illumination utilised at dusk or dawn. The full name of the current model is the SUSAT L9A1. The sight is not designed as a sniper sight, but is rather intended to be mounted on a variety of rifles and to be used by all infantrymen.

Similar devices include the Advanced Combat Optical Gunsight (ACOG), manufactured by Trijicon, and the Elcan Specter.

== Use ==
SUSAT was the primary sighting system for the British Army's SA80 series weapons. It was also used with L108 and L110 light machine guns, and mounted to L7 and L111 machine guns. It was phased out and replaced by ACOG and ELCAN sight units during mid-life upgrade programmes. As of March 2025 it was still in use with much of the UK armed forces – primarily reserve, rear-echelon and for training use due to budgetary constraints.

It has been used by the armies of Cameroon, Oman, Spain and Sweden. In Spain, it was fitted to the CETME LV assault rifle and has also been used on Rheinmetall MG3 machine guns. In Sweden, it was used on the Ak5B.

== Reticle ==
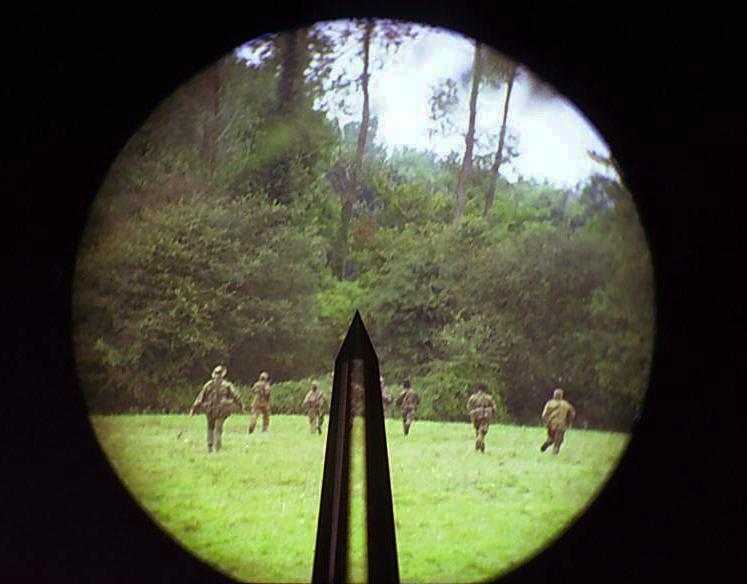
View through a SUSAT.

The reticle of the SUSAT uses a single obelisk-shaped post protruding from the bottom edge of the sight, rather than a crosshair. The reticle is tritium-illuminated for aiming in low-light conditions. The radioactive tritium light source has to be replaced every 8–12 years, since it gradually loses its brightness due to phosphor degradation and radioactive decay.

The L2A2 SUIT Sight uses a similar single post to the SUSAT, but protrudes from the top edge of the sight down to the middle of the field.

== Manufacturing ==
SUSAT is constructed from a one-piece, pressure die-cast, aluminium body, into which the eyepiece, objective lens and prisms are fitted as assemblies.

The SUSAT sight was developed in the United Kingdom by Royal Armament Research Development Establishment (RARDE) and is manufactured by United Scientific Instruments and Avimo, now known as Thales Optics.

== Specifications ==
SUSAT L9A1

- Overall dimensions: (L x W x H): 145 x 60 x 55 mm
- Weight: 417 grams
- Magnification: 4×
- Field of view: 10 degrees (177 mils)
- Objective diameter: 25.5 mm
- Exit pupil: 6.375 mm
- Eye relief: 25 mm
- Light permeability: >80%
- Reticle illumination: Red tritium, glass ampoule
- Illumination strength: Adjustable
- Tritium ampoule lifetime: 8–12 years
- Focus: −0.75 to −1.25 dioptres
- Operational temperature: −46 to +71 °C
- Range Settings: 100 to 600 meters (SUSAT L9A1) or 300 to 800 meters (SUSAT L12A1) in 100 m intervals
- NATO Stock Number (NSN): 1240-99-967-0947 (Sight Unit Small Arms Trilux (SUSAT) L12A1)

== See also ==
- C79 optical sight
- ACOG Optical Sight
- L2A2 SUIT Sight
- Specter
