= Trijicon =

American firearm sighting device company

- Type: Private
- Industry: Optics
- Founded: 1981
- Founder: Glyn Bindon
- Headquarters: Wixom, Michigan, United States
- Products: Optical sights, Night vision equipment
- Website: www.trijicon.com
- Footnotes; Contractor for the United States military

Trijicon, Inc. (/ˈtrɪdʒ.ɪ.kɒn/ TRIJ-ih-kon) is an American manufacturing company based in Wixom, Michigan, that designs and distributes sighting devices for firearms including pistols, rifles and shotguns. Trijicon specializes in self-luminous optics and night sights, mainly using the low-energy tritium illumination, light-gathering fiber optics and battery-powered LED.

Additionally, Trijicon is a contractor for the United States military and supplies the Advanced Combat Optical Gunsight (ACOG) as well as RX01 reflex sights. The ACOG, Reflex, TriPower, AccuPoint and Night Sights are available to military, law enforcement and civilian markets.

The company's name "Trijicon" comes from combining "tritium", a radioisotope of hydrogen that is the key element utilised in the company's reticle illumination technology, and "icon", meaning picture or image; the consonant "j" was added to help syllabically blend the two words into one portmanteau word. Additionally, the "iji" in Trijicon mimics the "three-dot" design of the Bright & Tough Night Sights that were being manufactured when the company was renamed in 1985.

== History ==
Trijicon was founded in 1981 by Glyn Bindon as Armson USA, the sole US importer and distributor of the Armson OEG. The Armson OEG was an occluded-type gunsight that used tritium and fiber optics in its construction and was manufactured in South Africa. It was created in 1981 and reached shops in 1983. The gunsight became popular due to its variety of mounting systems for popular rifles and shotguns.

In 1985 Bindon reorganized the company as Trijicon and began manufacture of night sights for pistols. Trijicon introduced a tritium-illuminated telescopic sight for the US Military called the TA01 4x32 Advanced Combat Optical Gunsight (ACOG) in 1987.

== Controversy ==
On January 18, 2010, ABC News reported that Trijicon was placing references to Biblical verses on the side of the ACOG sights sold to the United States military. Legal and religious organizations spoke out against the practice and Trijicon subsequently ceased the practice and provided customers with kits to remove the Bible verse numbers from existing scopes.

== See also ==
- Aimpoint AB
- EOTech
- ELCAN Optical Technologies
