= Sost, Afghanistan =

Sost
- Location in Afghanistan
- Coordinates: 36°59′0″N 72°46′0″E
- Country: Afghanistan
- Province: Badakhshan Province
- Time zone: + 4.30

Sost is a village in Badakhshan Province in north-eastern Afghanistan.

Sost is inhabited by Wakhi people. The population of the village (2003) is 550.

== See also ==
- Badakhshan Province
