= Advanced Combat Optical Gunsight =

American series of telescopic sights manufactured by Trijicon

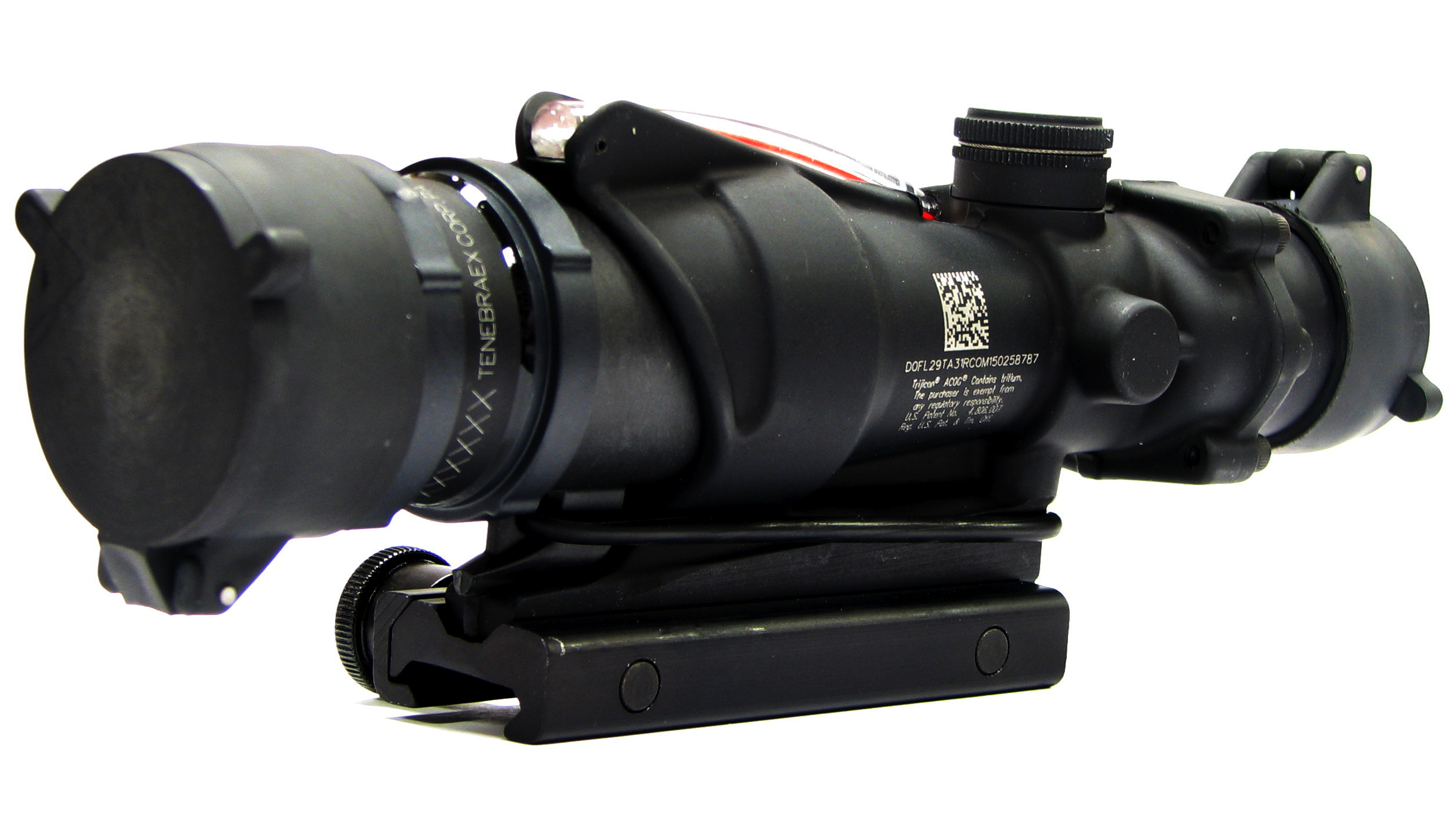
The TA31RCO variant of the ACOG is designated as the M150 RCO in United States Army service.

The Advanced Combat Optical Gunsight (ACOG) is a series of prismatic telescopic sights manufactured by Trijicon. The ACOG was originally designed to be used on the M16 rifle and M4 carbine, but Trijicon has also developed ACOG accessories for other firearms. Models provide fixed-power magnification levels from 1.25× to 6×. ACOG reticles are illuminated at night by an internal tritium phosphor. Some versions have an additional daytime reticle illumination via a passive external fiberoptic light pipe or are LED-illuminated using a dry battery. The first ACOG model, known as the TA01, was released in 1987.

== History ==
The first ACOG model, known as the TA01, was released in 1987. An example was tested on the Stoner 93 in the early 1990s by the Royal Thai Armed Forces. In 1995, United States Special Operations Command selected the 4×32 TA01 as the official scope for the M4 carbine and purchased 12,000 units from Trijicon. Between 2004 and 2005, the TA31RCO-A4 & M4 (AN/PVQ-31A & 31B) was selected as the official Rifle Combat Optic of the United States Marine Corps, prompting Trijicon to produce 100,000 units for the US Marines in the following 18 months.

== Design ==
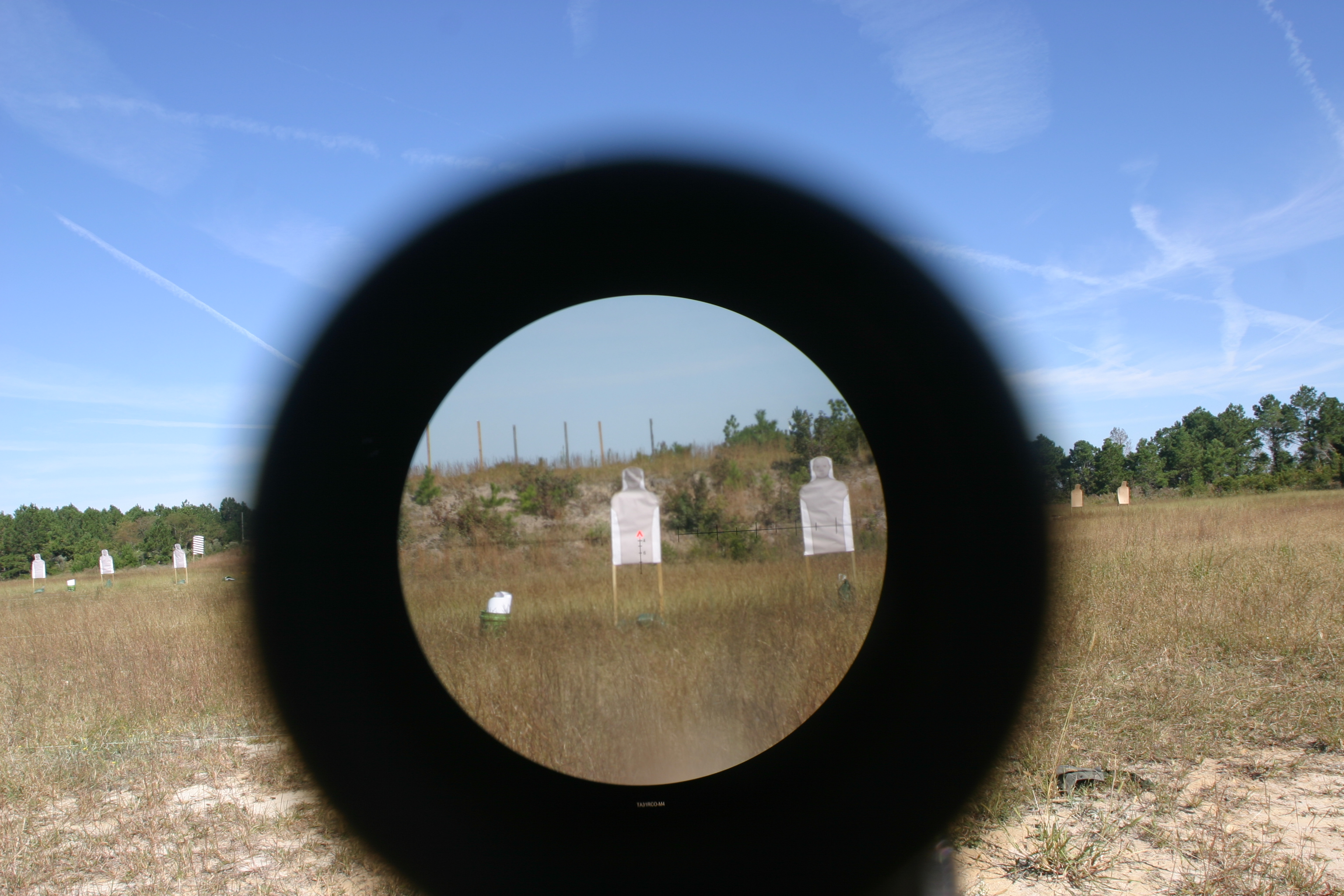
Down-range ACOG sight picture

The ACOG is available in a variety of configurations from the manufacturer with different reticles, illumination, and other features. Most ACOGs do not use batteries for reticle illumination, being designed to use internal phosphor illumination provided by the radioactive decay of tritium. The tritium illumination has a usable life of 10 to 15 years. Some versions of the ACOG have an additional daytime reticle illumination via a passive external fiber optic light pipe. Normally this allows the brightness of the reticle to match the field of view since it collects ambient light from around the sight, although this can lead to a mismatch in lighting — such as sunlight hitting the light pipe directly, or standing in a shadow — causing the reticle to be much brighter or darker than the target. Reticles have other features such as a bullet drop compensator and other different reticle shapes such as chevrons.

Some ACOG models incorporate rudimentary ghost ring iron sights as a backup for targets that are within 50 m (55 yd). Most ACOG models, when mounted to a carry handle, have an open space through the mount to allow the use of the rifle's iron sights without removing the scope. Others include Docter or Trijicon reflex sights mounted on top, such as the TA11SDO (SU-258/PVQ) and the TA648MGO (SU-260P). The ACOG ECOS line features both of these secondary sighting systems on the same scope.

Other features include Picatinny rails like the TA648MGO, flip caps, and the ability to be waterproof up to 11 m (36 ft).

Although the ACOG is designed for the Picatinny rail of the M16A4 and M4, it can be mounted on the carrying handles of previous models by using a special adapter.

== Bindon aiming concept ==
Several ACOG models are designed to be used with the "Bindon Aiming Concept", an aiming technique developed by Trijicon founder and optical designer Glyn Bindon. The technique is essentially using the illuminated part of the reticle and its focusing rear eyepiece as a collimator sight. As in any other collimator sight, the user does not actually look through the sight but instead keeps the collimated (infinity) image of the illuminated part of the reticle in focus with the dominant eye while the other eye views the entire field of view to acquire the target. In this both-eyes-open technique the brain superimposes the aiming reticle on the target. An added part of the technique is to shift focus after acquisition to the dominant eye/telescopic image for more accurate shooting. This overcomes the problem of centering or acquiring fast traversing targets common with all telescopic sights. Only certain models of the ACOG are designed with bright enough daylight-lit fiber optic or battery-powered LED reticles that facilitate this technique.

== Controversy ==
Trijicon has been the subject of some criticism for inscribing references to Bible verses (e.g. JN8:12, referring to John 8:12, "I am the Light of the World") alongside the model numbers on their ACOG sights. Starting in late 2009, Trijicon began shipping sights to the U.S. military without Bible verses.

== Users ==
- Georgia
- Indonesia: Used by Indonesian Army for standard Infantry Optic on Pindad SS2-V4 and SS2-V7 rifles, marksman and suppressed versions respectively
- Ireland: Used on Steyr AUG Mod 14 service rifles
- Israel
- New Zealand: Used on MARS-L rifles
- Spain: Used on Heckler & Koch MG4 machine guns
- United Kingdom: Used by the British Army and the Royal Marines
- United States: United States armed forces:
  - The United States Army, Air Force and Marine Corps field the Trijicon TA31RCO ACOG, a 4× magnification model with a 32mm objective lens (4×32), with specially designed ballistic compensating reticles that are fiber optic & tritium illuminated, for the M4 carbine and M16A4 rifle. This sight is designated the M150 Rifle Combat Optic in Army service and AN/PVQ-31 Rifle Combat Optic in the Marine Corps. After an October 2005 evaluation, the USMC fielded 115,000 ACOGs so that every rifle and carbine in the Marine Corps inventory would be equipped with one.
  - The TA01NSN, a 4×32 ACOG with only tritium night illumination and backup iron sights, is included in the Special Operations Peculiar MODification (SOPMOD) kit for the M4A1 carbine used by Special Operations personnel to configure their weapons to individual preferences and mission requirements. Other Trijicon models have also seen service after being purchased at the unit and individual level.
  - The Marine Corps field the Trijicon 3.5x35 SU-258/PVQ Squad Day Optic on the M27 assault rifle.

== Gallery ==
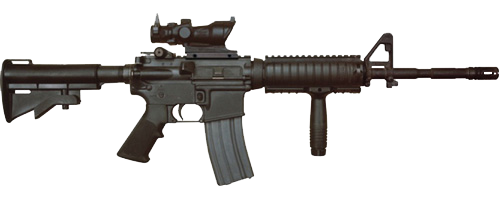
An M4 carbine with a TA01NSN ACOG

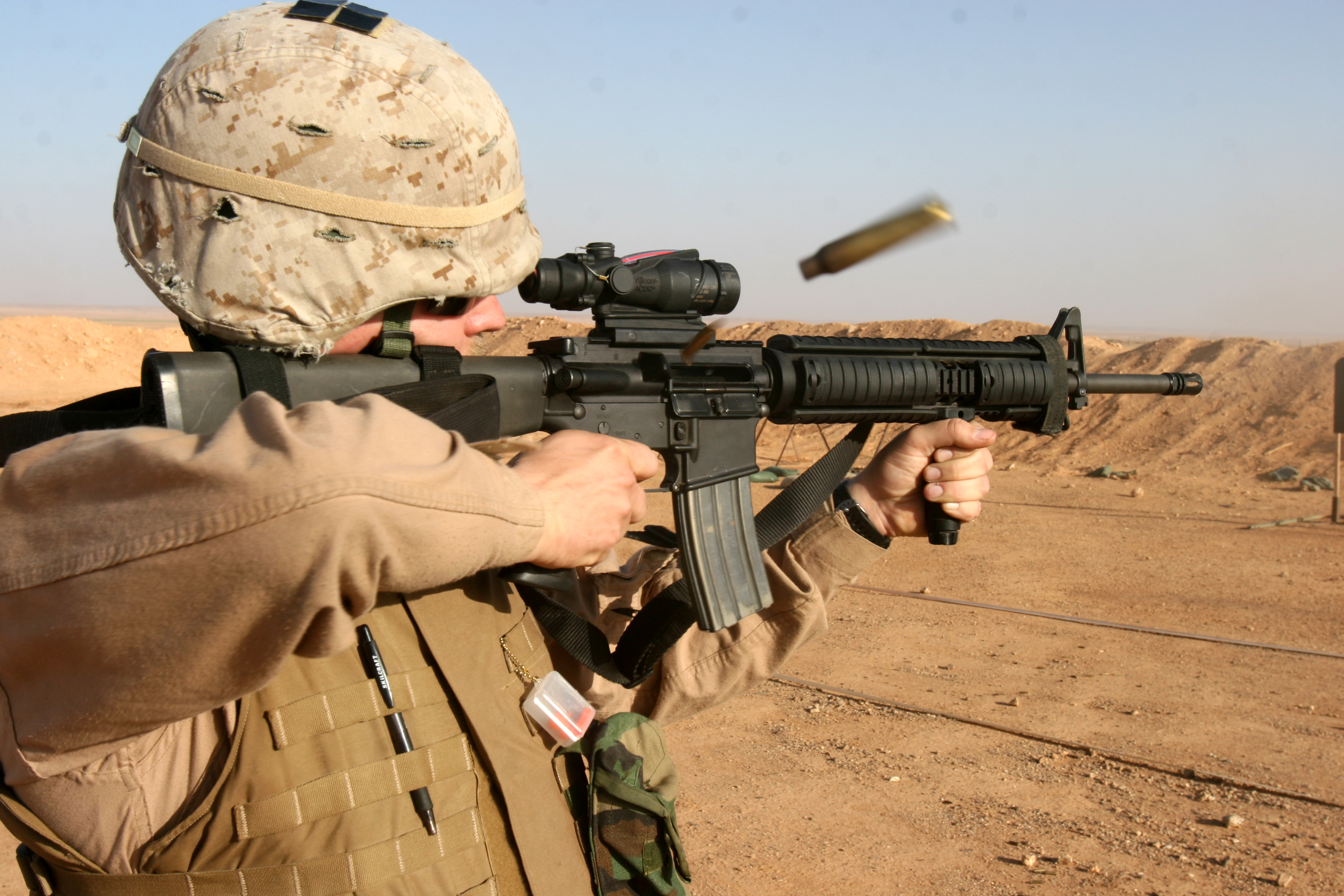
USMC-spec M16A4 fitted with ACOG, vertical foregrip, and AN/PVQ-31

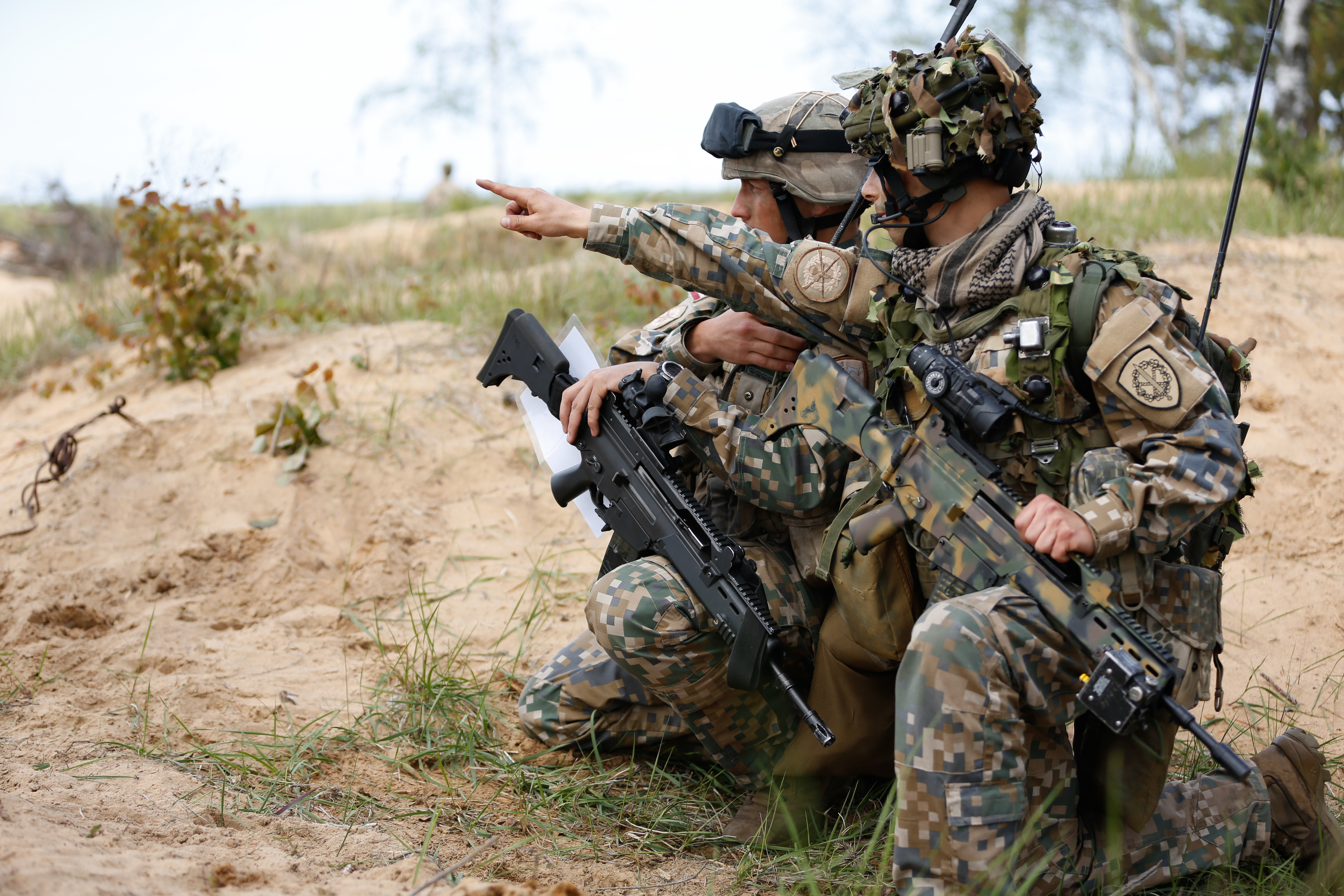
Latvian soldiers using a Heckler & Koch G36 rifle attached with Trijicon ACOG

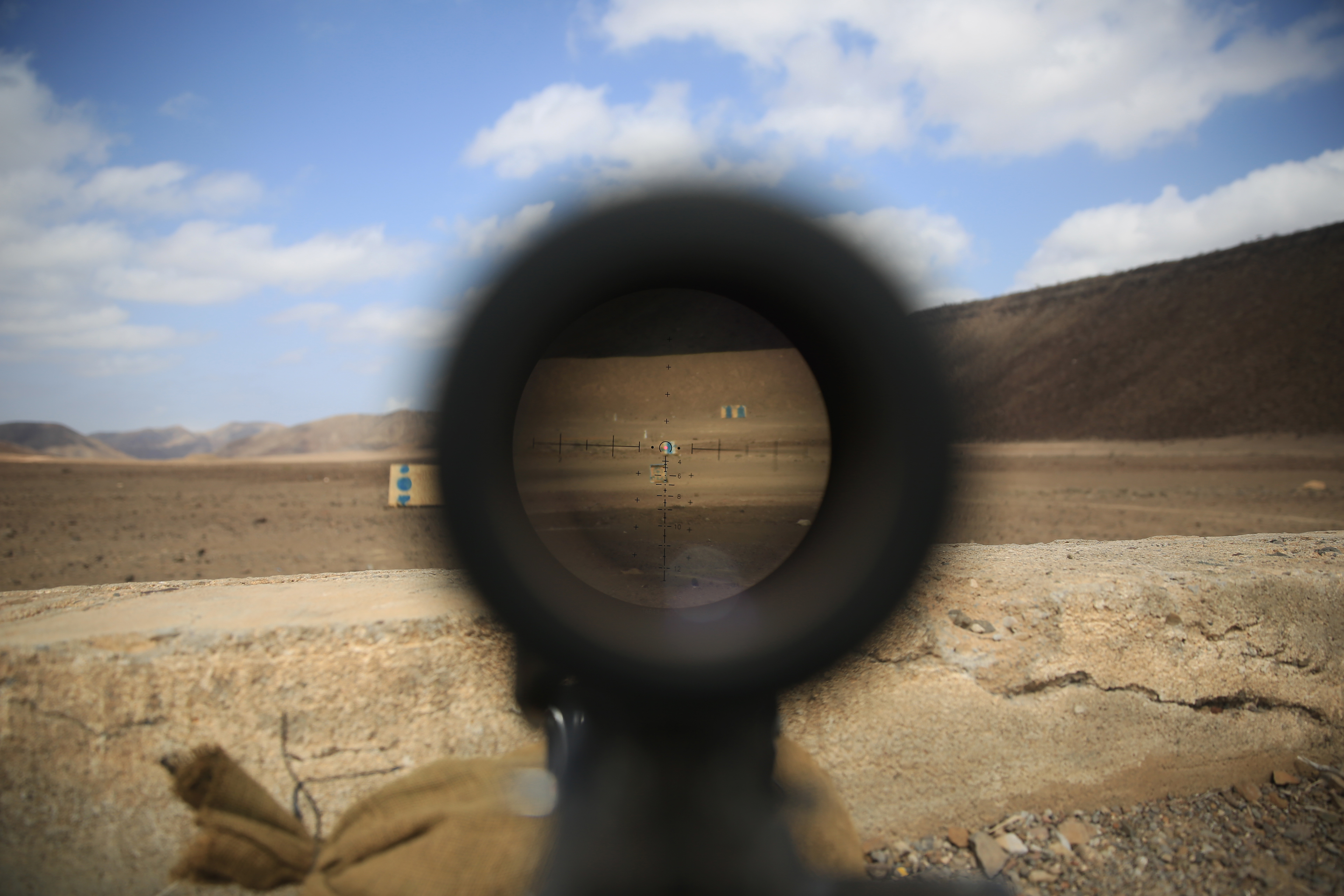
TA648 6×48 Machine Gun Optic reticle

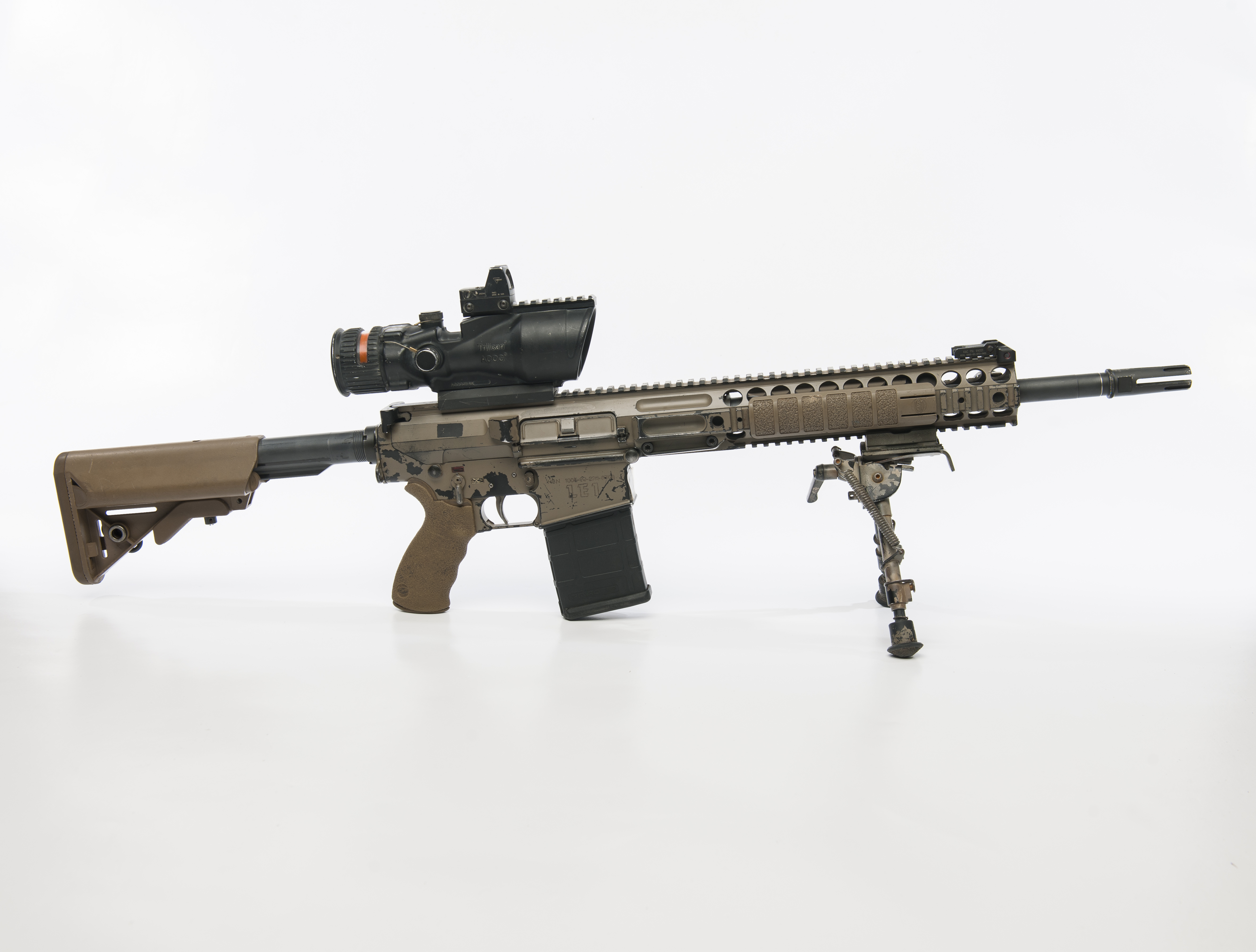
A L129A1 sharpshooter rifle with a TA648-308 6×48 ACOG fitted

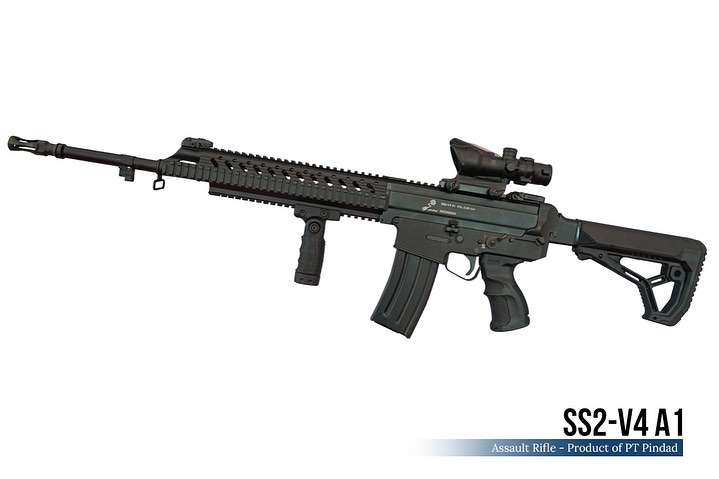
An SS2 equipped with ACOG

== See also ==
- Sight (device)
- SUSAT, British 4× telescopic sight with tritium-powered illumination similar to the ACOG
- Specter
- List of military electronics of the United States
