= Soest =

Soest may refer to:

== Places ==
- Soest, Germany
  - Soest (district), a district around the location in Germany
- Soest, Netherlands

== Other ==
- Gerard Soest, British artist
- SOEST, School of Ocean and Earth Science and Technology in Honolulu, Hawaii, USA
