= ELCAN Optical Technologies =

Canadian optics and electronics company

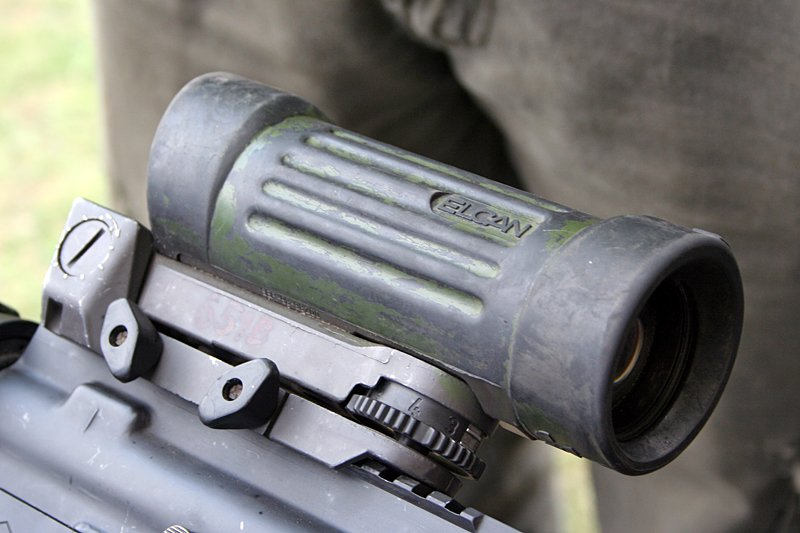
An ELCAN C79 3.4x28 sight.

Raytheon ELCAN Optical Technologies, also simply ELCAN (Ernst Leitz CANada), is a Canadian optics and electronics manufacturing company owned by American defense contractor RTX Corporation, currently based in Midland, Ontario. ELCAN produces optical devices geared towards both civilian and military markets, and their products are sold through Armament Technology Inc. based in Halifax, Nova Scotia, and associated channels of dealers.

== Products ==
ELCAN is perhaps best known for making the prismatic C79 optical sight that is widely used on the Colt Canada C7 and C8, FN Minimi, FN MAG and CZ-805 BREN families of firearms. The C79 is not designed as a sniper sight per se, but is rather intended to be mounted on a variety of service rifles used by regular infantrymen as well as designated marksmen. Unlike the M145, reticle illumination is through tritium gas.

The M145 Machine Gun Optic is a variant of the C79, which is different to the standard version in that ballistic compensation is in the reticle rather than in the mount. Reticle illumination is by a battery-powered LED with eleven brightness settings. It is used by the US military for its M249s and M240s.

ELCAN currently manufactures the "Specter" line of combat optics in a variety of configurations. The Specter 4× Optical Sight, DR 1.5×/6×, DR 1x/4× and TR 1/3/9 are available with a BDC reticle for the 5.56×45mm NATO or the 7.62×51mm NATO.

ELCAN has built photographic and cinematic lenses as well, for both image capture and projection for 35mm Leica cameras as well as IMAX.

== See also ==
- Aimpoint AB
- Trijicon
- EOTech
- ITL MARS
