= LMT Modular Ambidextrous Rifle System =

Assault rifle by Lewis Machine & Tool Company

- LMT MARS rifle
- Type: Assault rifle Battle rifle
- Place of origin: United States

Service history
- In service: 2015 - present

Production history
- Designer: Lewis Machine & Tool Company
- Manufacturer: Lewis Machine & Tool Company

Specifications
- Mass: 3.3kg (empty)
- Length: 914 mm (36.0 in); ("Maximum")
- Cartridge: 5.56×45mm NATO; 7.62×51mm NATO; 6.5mm Creedmoor
- Action: Gas-operated, rotating bolt (internal piston, not direct impingement) or Short-stroke piston
- Feed system: 5.56×45mm NATO: 30-round detachable box magazine 7.62×51mm NATO 20-round detachable box magazine

The LMT Modular Ambidextrous Rifle System (MARS) is an assault rifle designed and manufactured by Lewis Machine & Tool Company.

== History ==
In May 2014, a tender was issued by the New Zealand Ministry of Defence for a new rifle. After trials were conducted from March 2 to June 1, 2015, LMT was selected as the winner, which would replace their Steyr AUGs.

== Design ==
The MARS rifles features lower receivers updated with fully ambidextrous mirrored controls and can be set up to use gas-operated, rotating bolt (internal piston, not direct impingement) or short-stroke piston operating systems with the help of basic tools.

The MARS receiver can host and switch between barrels of varying length, and diameter, material, and caliber. Two locking bolts accessible from the right side of the receiver with a basic tool lock a barrel extension and make the barrel unit user removable with a return to zero of the same barrel.

The MARS-L (light) assault rifle variants are chambered for the 5.56×45mm NATO intermediate cartridge, and the MARS-H (heavy) battle rifle and designated marksman rifle variants for the 7.62×51mm NATO, 6.5 mm Creedmoor or similar fully powered cartridges.

=== Issue ===
In September 2018, it was reported that some of the New Zealand Defence Force rifles had experienced breakages, including 130 with cracks around the bolt, and that all 9,040 rifles had had their firing pins replaced under warranty.

LMT later claimed that the number of worn or broken firing pins was much smaller at "less than one-tenth of one percent".

The issue reportedly stemmed from improper tempering. While replacing the firing pins, a similar quantity of selector switches and bolt carriers had also been found to display premature wear and were replaced.

== Variants ==
=== Military versions ===
==== L129A2 ====
MARS-H based designated marksman variant, chambered in 6.5 mm Creedmoor.

Fitted with an 18 in (457 mm) barrel, a fully adjustable DMR stock and lengthened hand guard, a Leupold Mark 5HD 3.6-18×44 M5C3 Desert IR telescopic sight with TREMOR3 reticle, a HuxWrx suppressor, an Envision Technology ballistic calculator, and a Pixels-on-Target thermal sight was adopted in 2023.

The change from 7.62×51mm NATO ammunition to 6.5 Creedmoor was due to the 6.5 Creedmoor's better ability to successfully engage targets at distances around and over 800 m (875 yd).

The main disadvantages of this change are introducing a new chambering in the logistics chain, and due to a higher O_{ratio} is shortened barrel life. The upper receiver still uses a gas-operated, rotating bolt (internal piston) system like the L129A1, but the handguard attachment points on its sides were changed to be M-LOK compatible.

==== LMT R-20 Rahe ====
Estonian custom MARS variant.

==== 7.62mm Zf Stgw 20 ====
Swiss MARS-H-based designated marksman rifle chambered in 7.62×51mm NATO.

Fitted with the Schmidt & Bender 3-20×50 PM II Ultra Short telescopic sight with the TREMOR3 reticle that enables quick targeting up to 800 m (875 yd) as their standard aiming optic.

==== Stgw 25 ====
Swiss MARS-L based 16 in (406 mm) barreled short-stroke piston assault rifle variant.

==== Stgw 25K ====
Swiss MARS-L based 12 in (305 mm) barreled short-stroke piston assault rifle variant.

==== MK24 Mid-Range Gas Gun-Assault ====
LMT's MRGG-A is a member of its Modular Ambidextrous Rifle System-Heavy (MARS-H) family, which are commonly described as AR-10-style rifles, but is chambered to fire the 6.5mm Creedmoor round.

The MRGG-A configuration LMT has shown publicly has a 14.5″ barrel built into an upper receiver with a ‘monolithic’ Picatinny type rail for optics and other accessories that runs the full length of the top of the rifle. The sides of the handguard have additional accessory attachment points utilizing the increasingly popular M-LOK system from Magpul.

The gun has ambidextrous controls and is capable of semi-automatic and fully-automatic fire. LMT has also shown MRGG-As with scopes from Nightforce Optics.

Back in 2021, Nightforce announced it had secured a contract from SOCOM for ATACRTM 4-20×50 F1 scopes “to augment multiple systems in the SOCOM inventory and… to support the MRGG (Mid-Range Gas Gun) once it is fielded.”

In U.S. service, those optics are also referred to as Ranging-Variable Power Scopes (R-VPS).

=== Civilian versions ===
For civilian customers LMT offers semi-automatic variants of the New Zealand Reference Rifle, Estonia R20 RAHE Reference Rifle, UK L129A2 Reference Rifle, and USSOCOM MRGG-A Reference Rifle.

== Users ==
- Estonia: Main service rifle of the Estonian Defence Forces designated the R20 RAHE.
- Lebanon
- New Zealand: Main service rifle of the New Zealand Defence Force. MARS-L chambered in 5.56x45 NATO.
- Switzerland: In use with the Swiss Armed Forces. Designated the STGW 25 (5.56), and STGW 20 (7.62).
- United Kingdom: In use with the Royal Marines designated the L129A2.
- United States: In use with USSOCOM designated the MRGG-A.
