= L129A1 =

British designated marksman rifle

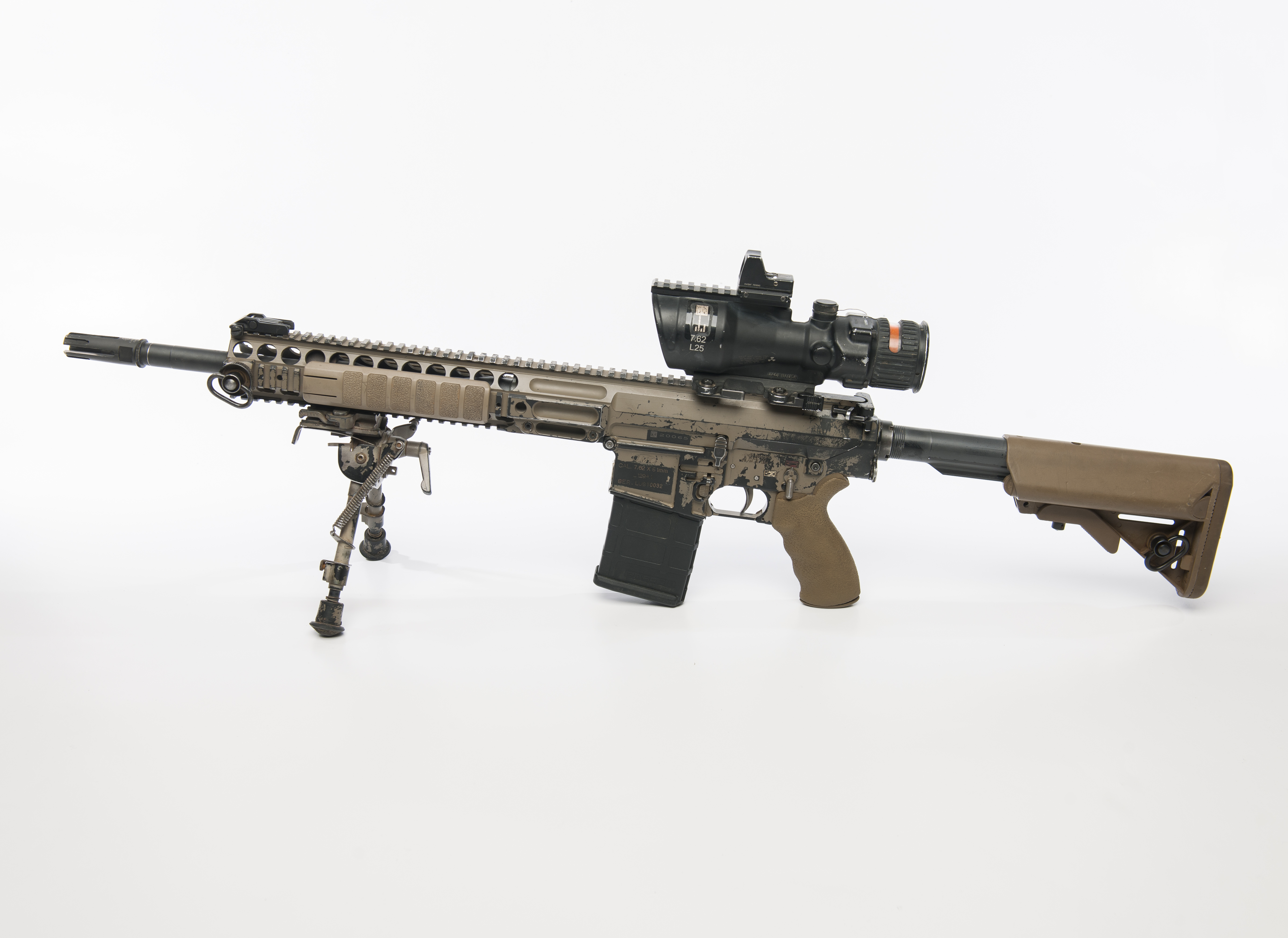
- An L129A1
- Type: Designated marksman rifle
- Place of origin: United States; United Kingdom

Service history
- In service: October 2009 – present
- Used by: British Armed Forces
- Wars: War in Afghanistan

Production history
- Manufacturer: Lewis Machine & Tool Company
- No. built: 3,000+

Specifications
- Mass: 4.4 kg (9.7 lb)
- Length: 927 mm (36 in) (stock collapsed); 990 mm (39 in) (stock extended)
- Barrel length: 16 in (406 mm) (L129A1); 18 in (457 mm) (L129A2)
- Cartridge: 7.62×51mm NATO (L129A1); 6.5mm Creedmoor (L129A2)
- Action: Gas impingement, rotating bolt
- Effective firing range: 800 m (875 yd)
- Maximum firing range: 1,000 m (1,094 yd)
- Feed system: 20-round detachable SR-25 pattern magazine

The L129A1, also known as the L129A1 Sharpshooter Rifle, is a 7.62×51mm NATO designated marksman rifle manufactured by Lewis Machine & Tool Company (LMT) for the British Armed Forces.

It is a part of LMT's Modular Weapon System (MWS) small arms family.

== History ==
In 2009, Lewis Machine & Tool Co was contracted to supply the British Ministry of Defence (MOD) with 440 LM308MWS 7.62×51mm rifles under the official service designation as the L129A1. Its NATO Stock Number (NSN) is 1005-99-226-6708. As of December 2014, over 3,000 units have been supplied to UK forces.

During the war in Afghanistan British light infantry units sometimes found themselves outranged by small arms beyond the effective range of their assault rifles and light machine guns chambered for the intermediate 5.56 mm NATO cartridge. At ranges between 400 and 800 m (437 and 875 yd), the then available small arms capable of returning effective fire, were the general-purpose machine gun and the bolt-action sniper rifle. These weapons chambered for the fully-powered 7.62 mm NATO cartridge were not well suited to increase the effective engagement range of the British eight-man rifle sections.

The LM308MWS was submitted for the British Ministry of Defence's Urgent Operational Requirement (UOR) for immediate deployment of a semi-automatic 7.62 NATO caliber sharpshooter rifle in Afghanistan. Other rifles submitted included the FN Herstal SCAR-H, Heckler & Koch HK417 and Sabre Defence XR-10. LMT's rifle was chosen, earning it the L129A1 designation, and entering service in April 2010 in Afghanistan. One member (termed the "sharpshooter") of the British rifle sections, was issued an L129A1 instead of an assault rifle. The standard optic for the L129A1 is the TA648-308 6×48 Trijicon ACOG providing a 8 mm exit pupil for ample light gathering and a wide field of view. Two locking bolts accessible from the right side of the receiver with a basic tool lock a barrel extension and make the barrel unit user removable within minutes with a return to zero of the same barrel. It features an 11.25 in (285.8 mm) twist rate to fire standard 144-grain 7.62 mm ball up to 168-grain BTHP ammunition used by NATO, but the official issue rounds are 155-grain L42A1-A3 sniper and L59A1 "High Performance" ball ammunition. The ACOG is mounted to a Picatinny rail to which is fitted a Trijicon RM01 1 x Ruggedized Miniature Reflex (RMR) for Close Quarters Battle use.

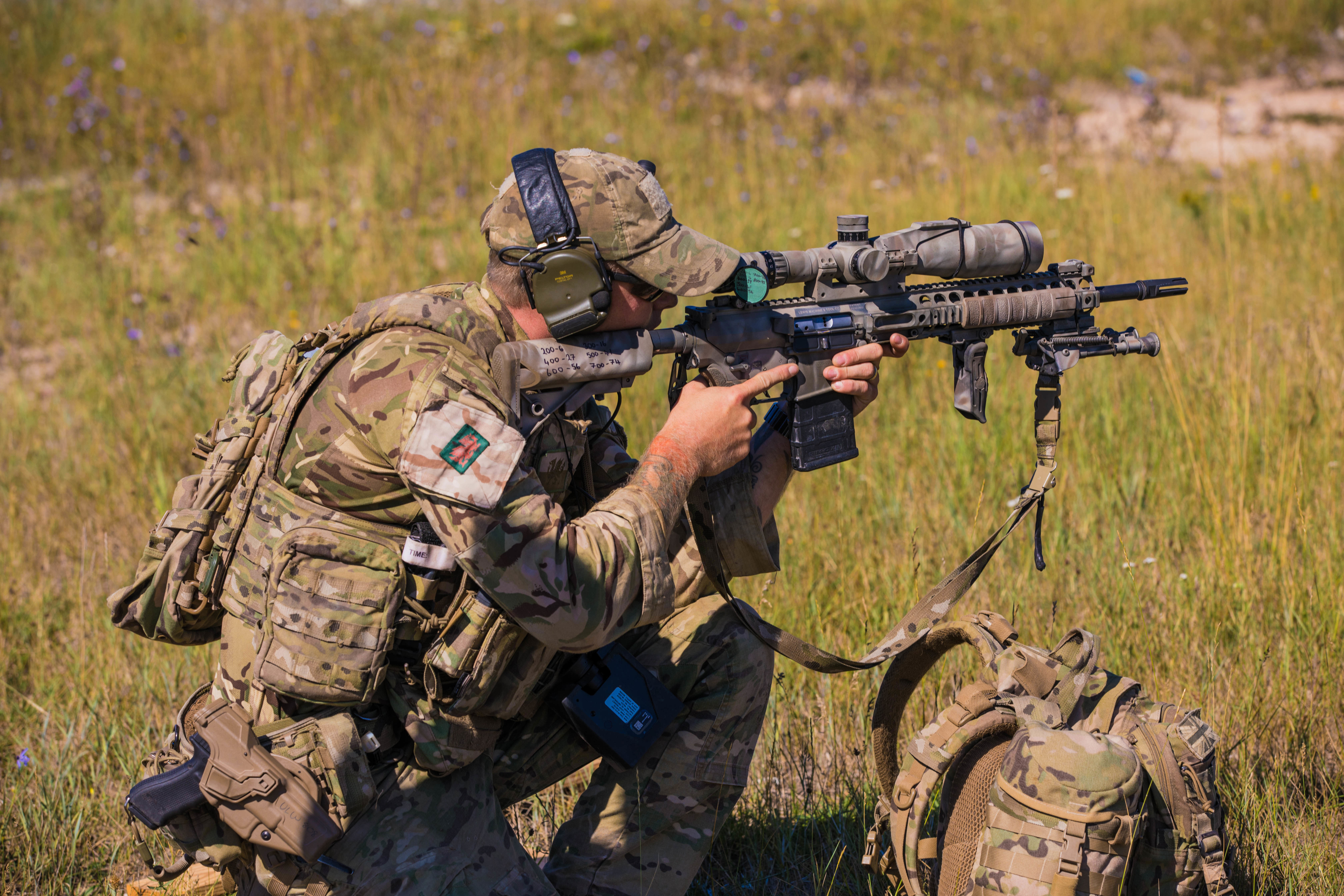
L129A1 Sniper Support Weapon (SSW) version fitted with a 3-12×50 telescopic sight

A Sniper Support Weapon (SSW) version, also designated L129A1, was adopted for use by the second man in each sniper team and is fitted with a Schmidt & Bender 3-12×50 telescopic sight and a Surefire suppressor.

Within the Royal Marines at least, an improved Modular Ambidextrous Rifle System (MARS-H) based L129A2 version chambered in 6.5 mm Creedmoor with an 18 in (457 mm) barrel, a new Leupold scope, a HuxWrx suppressor, an Envision Technology ballistic calculator, and a Pixels-on-Target thermal sight was adopted in 2023.

== Variants ==
=== L129A1 ===
Initial variant, chambered in 7.62×51mm NATO with 16 in (406 mm) barrel and 6×48 Trijicon ACOG. Adopted in 2009 and entered service in May 2010.

=== L129A2 ===
Updated MARS-H based L129A2 designated marksman rifle chambered in 6.5 mm Creedmoor with an 18 in (457 mm) barrel, a fully adjustable DMR stock and lengthened hand guard, a Leupold Mark 5HD 3.6-18×44 M5C3 Desert IR telescopic sight with TREMOR3 reticle, a HuxWrx suppressor, an Envision Technology ballistic calculator, and a Pixels-on-Target thermal sight was adopted in 2023.

The change from 7.62×51mm NATO ammunition to 6.5 Creedmoor was due to the 6.5 Creedmoor's better ability to successfully engage targets at distances around and over 800 m (875 yd). The main disadvantages of this change are introducing a new chambering in the logistics chain, and due to a higher O_{ratio} a shortened barrel life. The upper receiver still uses a gas-operated, rotating bolt (internal piston) system like the L129A1, but the hand guard attachment points on its sides were changed to be M-LOK compatible.

=== Civilian variants ===
A civilian variant of the rifle, termed the L129A1 Reference Rifle, supplied without any optic, is marketed by LMT for the U.S. market. A straight-pull version was also produced for the UK market.
