= 6.5mm Creedmoor =

Centerfire rifle cartridge

6.5mm Creedmoor (6.5x48mm)
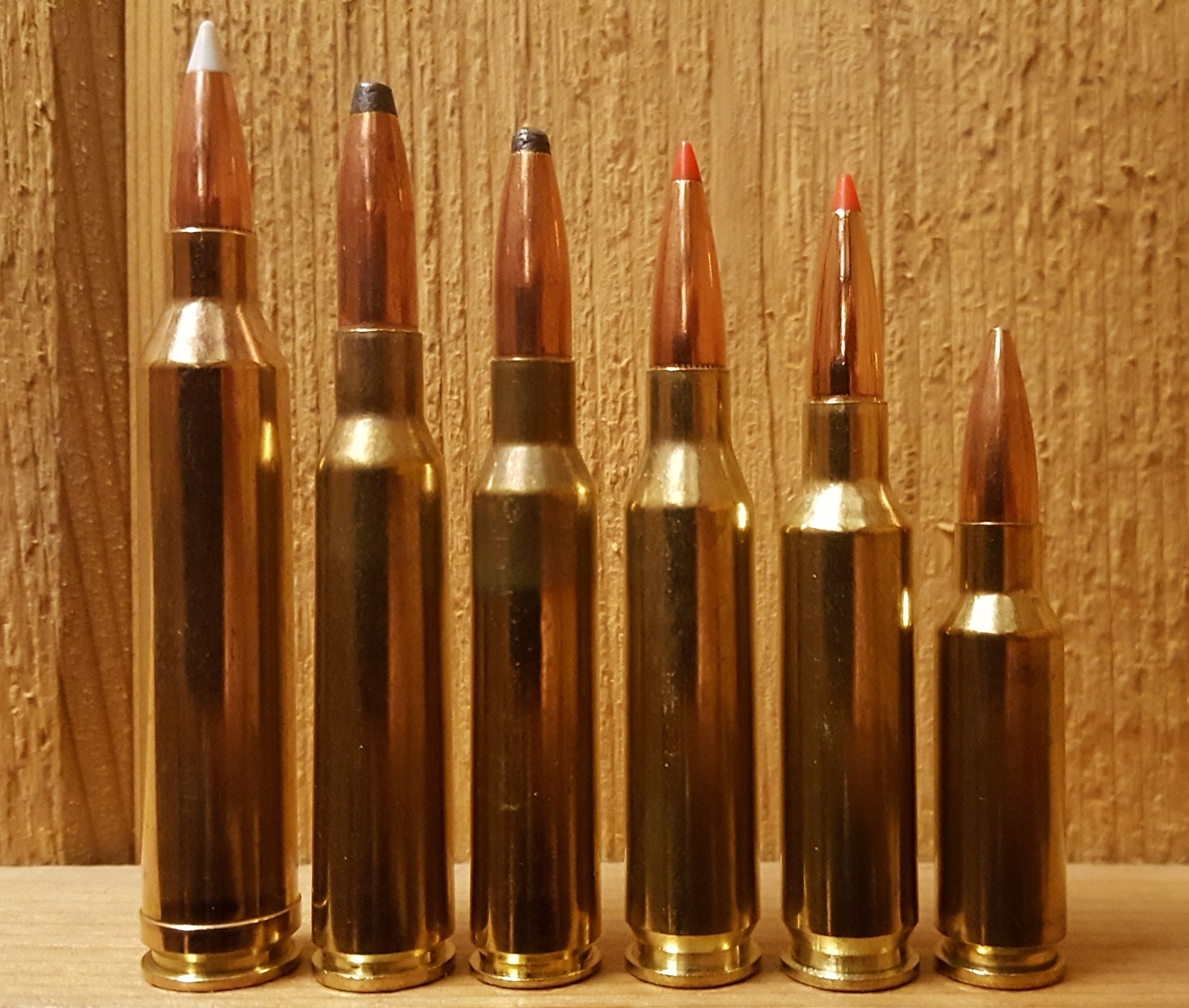
- Size comparison of some 6.5mm cartridges, left to right: .264 Winchester Magnum, 6.5×55mm Swedish, 6.5×52mm Carcano, .260 Remington, 6.5mm Creedmoor, 6.5mm Grendel
- Type: Rifle
- Place of origin: United States

Production history
- Designed: 2007
- Manufacturer: Hornady
- Produced: 2008–present

Specifications
- Parent case: .30 Thompson Center
- Case type: Rimless, bottleneck
- Bullet diameter: .264 in (6.7 mm)
- Land diameter: .2559 in (6.50 mm)
- Neck diameter: .2950 in (7.49 mm)
- Shoulder diameter: .4620 in (11.73 mm)
- Base diameter: .4703 in (11.95 mm)
- Rim diameter: .4730 in (12.01 mm)
- Rim thickness: .054 in (1.4 mm)
- Case length: 1.920 in (48.8 mm)
- Overall length: 2.825 in (71.8 mm)
- Case capacity: 52.5 gr H_{2}O (3.40 cm^{3})
- Rifling twist: 1 in 8 in (203 mm)
- Primer type: Large rifle, Small rifle (Alpha Munitions, Lapua, Peterson, and Starline brass)
- Maximum pressure (C.I.P.): 63,091 psi (435.00 MPa)
- Maximum pressure (SAAMI): 62,000 psi (430 MPa)

Ballistic performance
Bullet mass/type	Velocity	Energy
120 gr (8 g) AMAX	3,020 ft/s (920 m/s)	2,430 ft⋅lbf (3,290 J)
143 gr (9 g) Hornady ELD-X	2,710 ft/s (830 m/s)	2,283 ft⋅lbf (3,095 J)
- Test barrel length: 28 inch Sources: Hornady, SAAMI, C.I.P.

The 6.5mm Creedmoor (6.5x48mm) designated as 6.5 Creedmoor by SAAMI, and as 6,5 Creedmoor by the C.I.P. is a centerfire rifle cartridge introduced by Hornady in 2007. Hornady senior ballistics scientist Dave Emary developed it in partnership with Dennis DeMille, the vice-president of product development at Creedmoor Sports, hence the name. The cartridge is a necked-down modification of the .30 Thompson Center.

The 6.5mm Creedmoor was designed for long-range target shooting, although it is also used for medium game hunting. Bullet-for-bullet, the 6.5mm Creedmoor achieves a slower muzzle velocity than longer cartridges such as the 6.5-284 Norma or magnum cartridges such as the 6.5mm Remington Magnum. However, with an overall length of 2.825 inches (71.8 mm), it can be chambered in short-action rifles, as can the 6.5×47mm Lapua.

== Design considerations ==
In general, 6.5 mm (.264 in) bullets are known for their high sectional density and ballistic coefficients, and often have been used successfully in rifle competitions. The 6.5mm Creedmoor was designed for target shooting at longer ranges, and as such, couples a sensible ratio of case volume (3.40 ml) to bore area (34.66 mm^{2}/0.3466 cm^{2}) with ample space for loading long slender projectiles providing good aerodynamic efficiency and external ballistic performance for the projectile diameter. For some loads, the 6.5mm Creedmoor is capable of duplicating the muzzle velocity or trajectory of the .300 Winchester Magnum while generating significantly-lower recoil, based on lighter projectile weight.

== Cartridge dimensions ==
The 6.5mm Creedmoor has a 3.40 ml (52.5 gr H_{2}O) cartridge case capacity; the bullet is 6.72 mm in diameter and the case is 48.77 mm long.

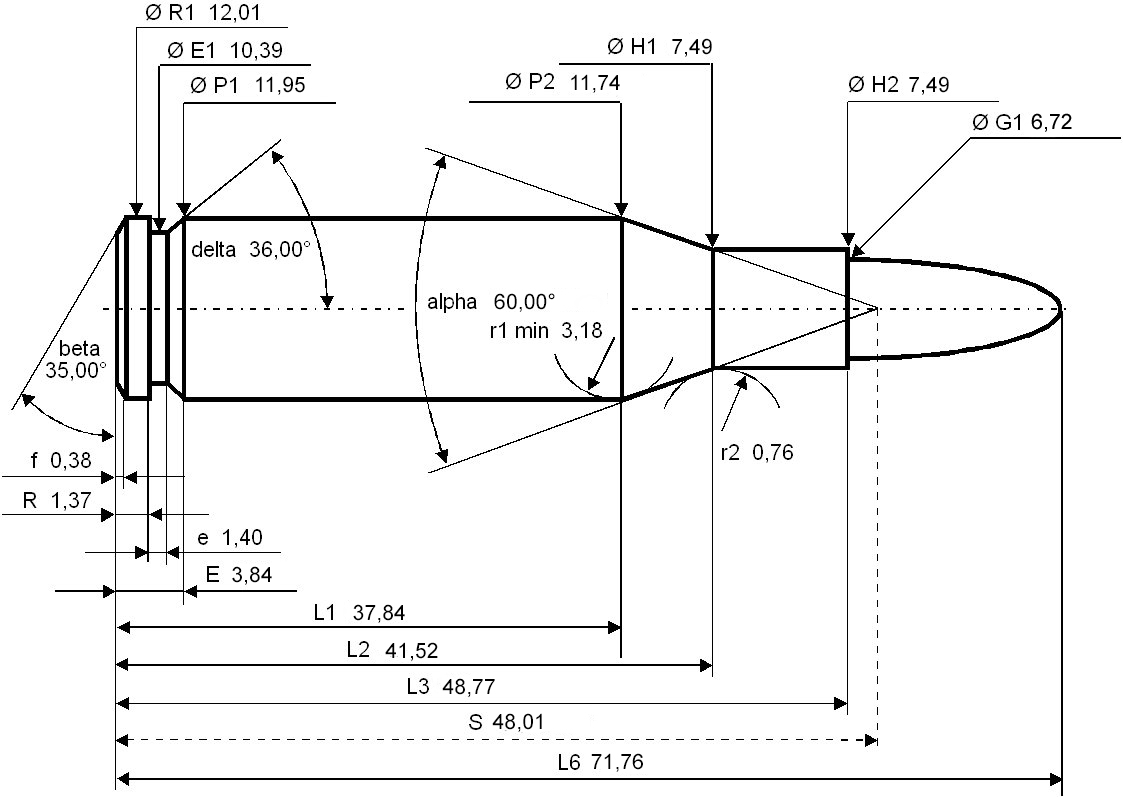

6.5mm Creedmoor maximum C.I.P. cartridge dimensions. All sizes in millimeters (mm).

Americans define the shoulder angle at alpha/2 = 30 degrees. The common rifling twist rate for this cartridge is 203 mm (1 in 8 in), 6 grooves, Ø lands = 6.50 mm (0.256 in), Ø grooves = 6.71 mm (0.264 in), land width = 2.29 mm (0.090 in), and the primer type is large rifle or small rifle depending on the cartridge case manufacturer.

According to the official C.I.P. (Commission Internationale Permanente pour l'Epreuve des Armes à Feu Portatives) rulings, 6.5mm Creedmoor can handle up to 435.00 MPa (63,091 psi) P_{max} piezo pressure. In C.I.P.-regulated countries, every rifle cartridge combo has to be proofed at 125% of this maximum C.I.P. pressure to certify for sale to consumers. In CIP-regulated areas, 6.5mm Creedmoor chambered arms are proof-tested at 543.80 MPa (78,872 psi) PE piezo pressure.

The SAAMI Maximum Average Pressure (MAP) for this cartridge is 62,000 psi (427.47 MPa) piezo pressure

== Performance ==
The 6.5mm Creedmoor is known for its exceptional accuracy and long-range performance. According to Gunners' Review, this ammunition is often regarded as a secret weapon for precision shooters due to its impressive ballistic properties.

The 6.5mm Creedmoor is a medium-power cartridge comparable to the .260 Remington and 6.5×47mm Lapua. Its energy at 300 yards using 129-grain Hornady SST bullets is listed by an independent reviewer as 1,641 foot-pounds force (2,225 J). For the 140-grain bullet at 2,700 feet per second (823 m/s) initial velocity, another reviewer reports an MPBR for a six-inch-high target of 265 yards (242 m), and reports a manufacturer-claim of "almost 1,600 ft⋅lbf (2,169 J)" of retained energy at 300 yards (274 m) using a 24 inches (610 mm) barrel. SAAMI test data gives 6.5 mm Creedmoor, 15 feet (4.6 m) from muzzle, velocity of 2,940 ft/s (896 m/s) for the 129-grain bullet and 2,690 ft/s (820 m/s) for the 140-grain bullet (which compares to .300 Winchester Magnum data of 2,930 ft/s (893 m/s) for a 200-grain bullet and 2,665 ft/s (812 m/s) for a 210-grain bullet).

The 6.5mm Creedmoor with 140-grain ammunition from both Hornady and Desert Tech and shot with a Desert Tech MDRX rifle (20 inch barrel), achieved groups averaging half to sub MOA (0.5-1 MOA).

The cartridge stays supersonic and maintains its accuracy to past 1,200 yd (1,097 m), while the .308 Winchester with 168-grain match bullets has a supersonic range of about 975 yd (892 m).

A semi-automatic sniper rifle with a 20-inch barrel chambered in 6.5mm Creedmoor is capable of engaging military targets from point blank range to 1,200 meters.

== Handloading ==
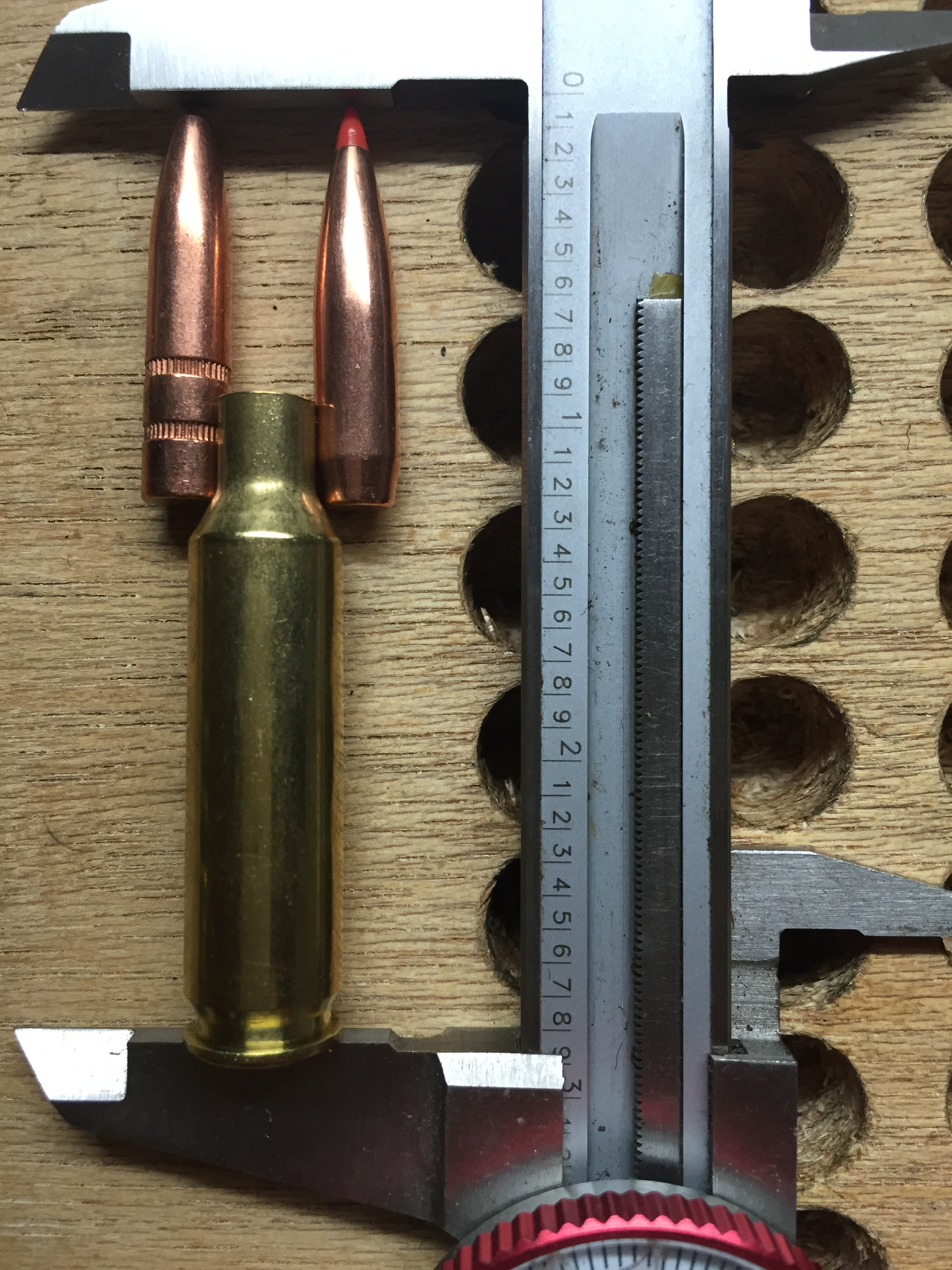
The longest 140gr bullets reach the neck-shoulder junction. Due to the relatively long neck, it can be reloaded with long target bullets without placing the base of the bullet below the neck. This eliminates the "donut" problem seen in many cases after being reloaded over 20 times. Left to right: a Remington 140gr and a 123gr A-Max. Calipers are set to magazine length.

Handloading costs for the 6.5mm Creedmoor are roughly equivalent to other 6.5mm cartridges, such as the 6.5×47mm Lapua, due to the availability of Lapua small primer brass for both cartridges. As of January 2020 Lapua is also manufacturing 6.5 Creedmoor brass with large rifle primers. Norma makes brass for the cartridge, and Norma brass is available through several major retailers at approximately the same cost as Lapua brass. Lapua brass for 6.5×47 lasts for about 12 to 20 reloads. Starline sells brass cases with either large or small primer pockets, with small pocket brass costing slightly more.

After the 6.5mm Creedmoor was introduced, it was advertised as a 60,000 psi capable case. However, after it was placed into production, Hornady listed it as 62,000 psi, then registered it with SAAMI as such. For this reason, many handloaders have poor experiences reloading for it. Blown primers on the first shot at 62,000 psi are not uncommon. Early shooting articles listed the ammo as loaded to 58,000 psi, but later citations list it as 57,000 psi. Hornady reduced the loads in its factory ammo because of complaints it was often blowing primers.

Lapua delivered 6.5mm Creedmoor brass at Shot Show 2017, and production quantities became available via major retailers in the second quarter of 2017. The Lapua version has a small primer pocket. Thus, load data for small-primer brass are not interchangeable with those for large-primer brass. A smaller-diameter decapping rod is required for sizing and decapping. As of January 2020, Lapua also manufactures its brass with large rifle primers to address concerns that some small rifle primers may not efficiently ignite the powder charge in cold weather, causing hang fires or misfires. Large rifle primer Lapua brass also allows the use of a standard-size decapping rod.

== 6.5mm Creedmoor as parent case ==
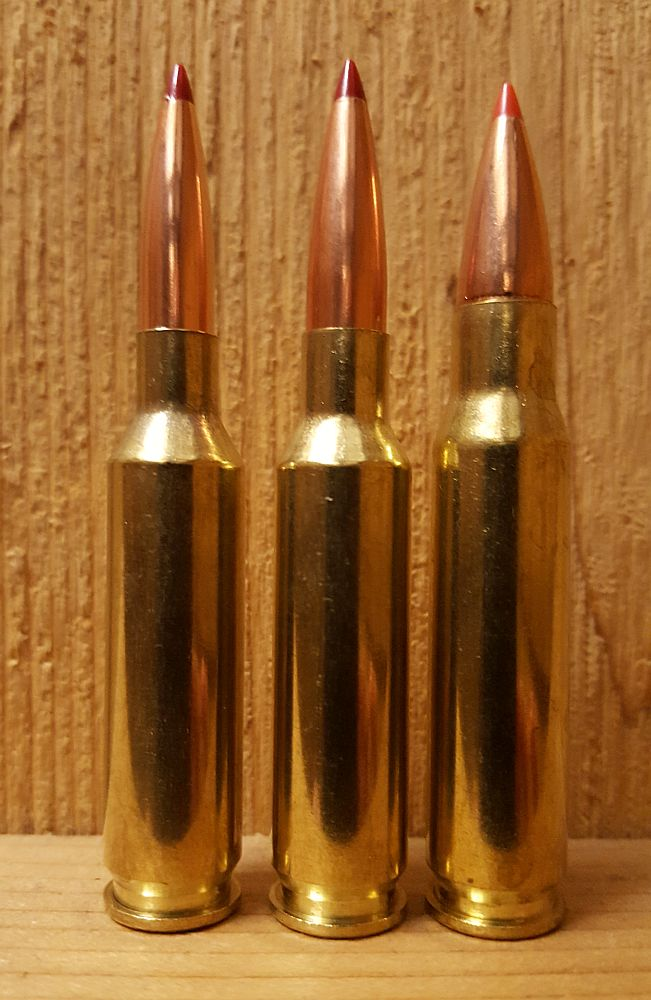
From left: 6mm Creedmoor, 6.5mm Creedmoor, .308 Winchester

The 6mm Creedmoor is a necked-down version of the 6.5mm Creedmoor using 6 mm (.243 inch) bullets, lighter than 6.5 mm bullets with similarly reduced recoil. John Snow at Outdoor Life built a 6mm Creedmoor rifle in 2009 for a magazine article of the wildcat cartridge that appeared in 2010, but the first documented conception of the 6mm Creedmoor was by Lee Gardner, a Snipershide forum user in May 2009. As of May 2018, Savage Arms offers three bolt-action rifles and one semi-automatic rifle chambered in 6mm Creedmoor. As of May 2018, Hornady offers 87-gr Varmint Express, 103-gr Precision Hunter and 108-gr Match ammunition in 6mm Creedmoor. Performance-wise, the 6mm Creedmoor is nearly identical to .243 Winchester, with slightly less powder room but often loaded to slightly higher pressures. However, since the cartridge was designed from the outset to handle longer bullets better, and rifles are accordingly built with faster twist rates, the 6mm Creedmoor will usually give better performance with heavier bullets than the .243.

The .22 Creedmoor is another even further necked-down version of the 6.5mm Creedmoor using .22 (.224 inch) bullets, lighter than 6 mm bullets with even softer recoil.

In more recent years, the 8.6 Blackout is a centerfire rifle cartridge developed by the firearms manufacturer Q, LLC. It utilizes a shortened case from the 6.5mm Creedmoor necked up to an 8.6 mm caliber (8.585 mm or 0.338 in diameter) projectile. 8.6 Blackout is designed for use in bolt-action rifles or as a caliber conversion for AR-10 style rifles.

== Military use ==
In October 2017, U.S. Special Operations Command (USSOCOM) tested the performance of 7.62×51mm NATO (M118LR long-range 7.62×51mm NATO load), .260 Remington, and 6.5mm Creedmoor cartridges out of SR-25, M110A1, and Mk 20 Sniper Support Rifle (SSR) rifles. SOCOM determined 6.5 Creedmoor performed the best, doubling hit-probability at 1,000 m (1,094 yd), increasing effective range by nearly half, reducing wind drift by a third, with less recoil than 7.62×51mm NATO rounds. Tests showed the .260 Remington and 6.5mm Creedmoor cartridges were similarly accurate and reliable, and the external ballistic behavior was also very similar. The prevailing attitude is that there was more room to develop projectiles and loads with the 6.5 mm Creedmoor.

As the two cartridges (7.62×51mm NATO and 6.5mm Creedmoor) have similar dimensions, the same magazines can be used, and a rifle can be converted with just a barrel change. This led to its adoption and fielding by special operations snipers to replace the 7.62×51mm NATO cartridge in their semi-automatic sniper rifles, planned in early 2019. In response to SOCOM's adoption, Department of Homeland Security also decided to adopt the round. U.S. Special Operations Command will convert its 7.62×51mm NATO M110 Semi-automatic Sniper rifle (SASS) and Mk 20 Sniper Support Rifle (SSR) rifles to 6.5 Creedmoor in 2019, a process that requires just a new barrel. In 2018, USSOCOM announced they would roll-out 6.5 mm Creedmoor in a long-range precision (sniper) rifle and use it in a carbine (assault rifle) and a machine-gun.

At the National Defense Industry Association's annual Special Operations Forces Industry Conference (SOFIC), beginning May 20, 2019, FN unveiled a prototype of its Mk 48 Mod 2 machine gun chambered in 6.5 mm Creedmoor to fill a USSOCOM requirement. American special operations forces are in the process of acquiring a lightweight belt-fed machine gun that offers greater range than existing weapons. 6.5 Creedmoor has since received the designation of XM1200.

In November 2019, the U.S. Navy ordered 6.5 mm Creedmoor conversion kits to upgrade the M110 Semi-Automatic Sniper System to the M110K1 variant.

In April 2020 the United States Department of Defense decided to replace the Mk 13 .300 Winchester Magnum sniper rifle with a 20-inch (508 mm) barrel, semi-automatic AR-10 platform chambered in 6.5 mm Creedmoor and ammunition for engagements from 0 to 1,200 yards (0 to 1,097 m).

In August 2023, Geissele Automatics announced its design had been selected for USSOCOM's Mid-Range Gas Gun Sniper (MRGG-S) program. The objective statement called for a rifle chambered in 6.5 mm Creedmoor with accuracy of 0.5-1.0 MOA at 100 yd (91 m) and weighing less than 10.5 lb (4.8 kg). The SOCOM designation for the weapon is the Mk 1 Mod 0.

The British Royal Marines adopted the L129A2 designated marksman rifle chambered in 6.5 mm Creedmoor with an 18 in (457 mm) barrel, a new Leupold scope, a HuxWrx suppressor, an Envision Technology ballistic calculator, and a Pixels-on-Target thermal sight in 2023.

== See also ==
- 6.5×47mm Lapua
- .30 Remington
- 6 mm caliber
- 6.5mm Grendel
- 6.5×50mmSR Arisaka
- 6.5×52mm Carcano
- 6.5×55mm Swedish
- 6.8mm Remington SPC
- .276 Pedersen
- .277 Fury
- .280 British
- List of firearms
- List of rifle cartridges
- Table of handgun and rifle cartridges
