= Mid-Range Gas Gun =

U.S. special operations rifle procurement program

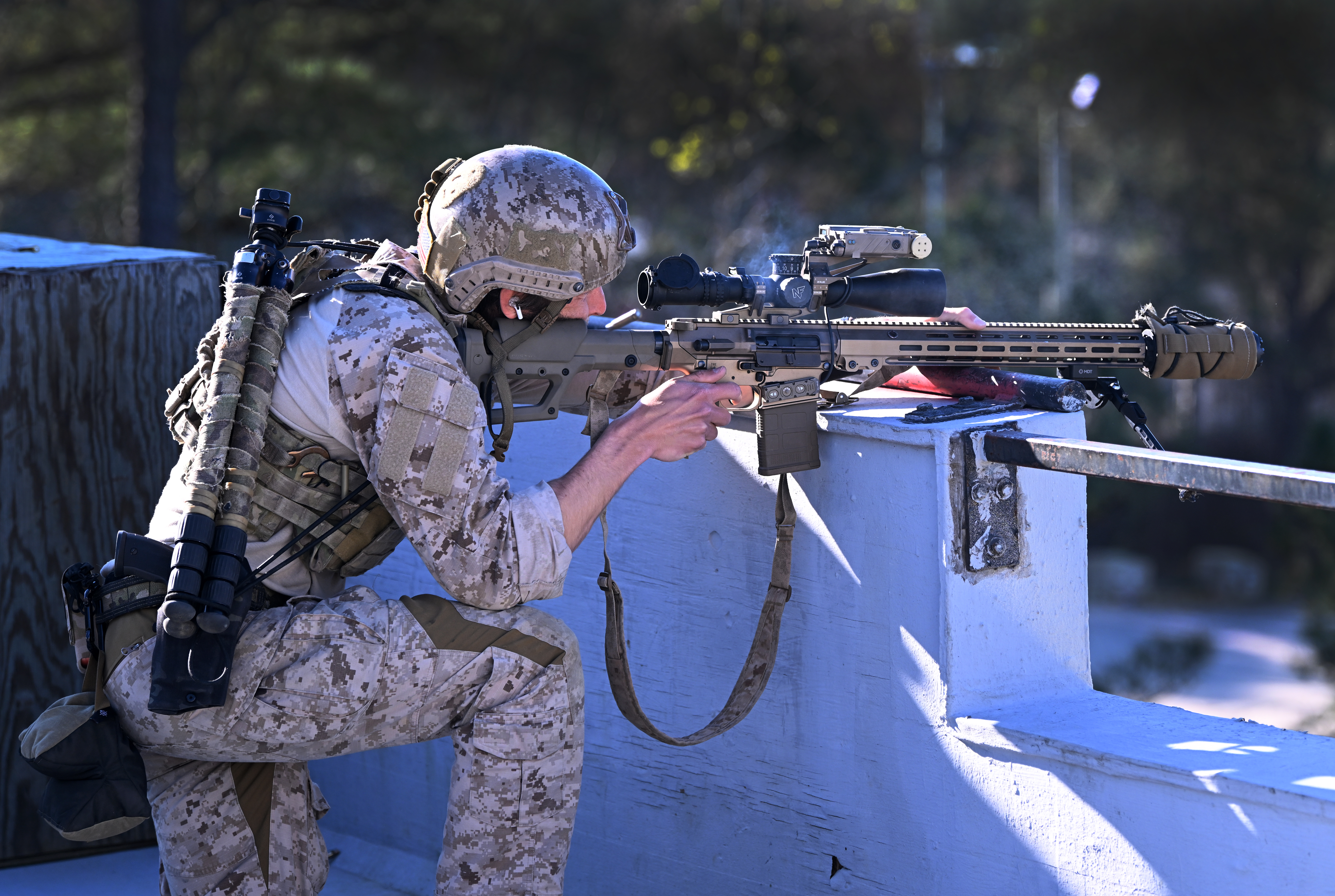
- Mk 1 Mod 0 MRGG-S being fired, 2024
- Type: Designated marksman rifle and sniper support weapon (MRGG-S); Selective-fire rifle (MRGG-A)
- Place of origin: United States

Service history
- In service: MRGG-S: 2023-present MRGG-A: in production; fielding planned fiscal year 2026
- Used by: United States Special Operations Command

Production history
- Designer: Geissele Automatics (MRGG-S); Lewis Machine & Tool Company (MRGG-A)
- Manufacturer: Geissele Automatics (MRGG-S); Lewis Machine & Tool Company (MRGG-A)
- Variants: MRGG-S (Mk 1 Mod 0); MRGG-A (Mk 24)

Specifications
- Cartridge: 6.5mm Creedmoor; 7.62x51mm NATO (user-swappable barrel)
- Action: Gas-operated, rotating bolt

The Mid-Range Gas Gun (MRGG), also rendered Medium Range Gas Gun, is a United States Special Operations Command rifle procurement program for gas-operated rifles chambered in 6.5mm Creedmoor and 7.62x51mm NATO. The program includes two requirements: the MRGG-S, a sniper support weapon and designated marksman rifle awarded to Geissele Automatics in 2023 and type-classified as the Mk 1 Mod 0, and the MRGG-A, a shorter selective-fire rifle awarded to Lewis Machine & Tool Company (LMT) in 2025 and type-classified as the Mk 24. The MRGG-S has been fielded since 2023. The Mk 24 MRGG-A is in production and is planned to replace the Mk 17 SCAR-H in SOCOM service, with fielding expected to begin in fiscal year 2026.

== Background ==
USSOCOM adopted the 6.5mm Creedmoor cartridge in 2018 after concluding that it extended the effective range of precision rifles and improved hit probability at long range compared with 7.62x51mm NATO. A Military User Assessment for the MRGG was conducted in 2019 at Camp Atterbury-Muscatatuck, Indiana. According to Soldier Systems Daily, LMT and LaRue Tactical were among the companies down-selected for further evaluation.

The MRGG effort was later divided into the MRGG-S and MRGG-A requirements. The rifles were sought to give special operations forces longer effective range than existing 5.56mm carbines and some 7.62mm rifles, including the M4A1 and M110.

== MRGG-S ==
=== Selection and contract ===
SOCOM's objective statement for the MRGG-S called for a sniper support rifle with a threshold accuracy requirement of 1.0 minute of angle at 100 yards and an objective requirement of 0.5 minute of angle at 100 yards. The command sought a semi-automatic rifle with a 20-inch barrel, a weight under 10.5 lb (4.8 kg), full-time suppressed fire, and a user-swappable barrel for 7.62x51mm NATO.

LMT submitted a rifle derived from its Modular Ambidextrous Rifle System-Heavy (MARS-H). The company said it delivered rifles for SOCOM down-select trials in 2022 and reported average accuracy just under 0.85 minute of angle for its initial program delivery.

On 31 August 2023, Geissele founder Bill Geissele announced that the company's submission had been selected for the MRGG-S. Geissele stated that the rifle had been known internally as "Project Joy" and that SOCOM's designation for the weapon was Mk 1 Mod 0. USSOCOM awarded Geissele Automatics of North Wales, Pennsylvania, an indefinite delivery/indefinite quantity contract, H92403-23-D-0003, with a ten-year ordering period and a maximum ceiling of US$29,263,029. The contract was for a sniper support weapon and designated marksman rifle, including spare parts, vendor support, new equipment training, engineering, and travel. It was awarded as a follow-on production contract from a competitive prototype agreement under 10 U.S.C. § 4022(f), with USSOCOM at MacDill Air Force Base, Florida, as the contracting activity.

=== Design ===
The Mk 1 Mod 0 is a gas-operated AR-10-pattern semi-automatic rifle. It uses billet aluminum upper and lower receivers, ambidextrous controls, a 20-inch cold-hammer-forged chrome-lined barrel, a free-floating M-LOK handguard, and a Geissele Super Semi-Automatic Enhanced two-stage trigger. The rifle is chambered in 6.5mm Creedmoor and has a user-swappable barrel for 7.62x51mm NATO. Its factory configuration pairs the rifle with Geissele's "Super Night Owl" titanium suppressor. Geissele has stated that the MRGG-S grew out of its Very Long-Range Semi-Automatic Sniper System work.

== MRGG-A ==
=== Selection and contract ===
The MRGG-A is the shorter, assaulter-oriented requirement within the MRGG program. It uses a 14.5-inch barrel, has selective-fire capability, and uses a different stock than the MRGG-S. SOCOM continued the assaulter requirement after the MRGG-S award.

The U.S. Department of Defense announced LMT's MRGG-A award in its daily contracting notice on 22 August 2025. The contract covered "medium range gas gun-assault kits, spare parts and accessories, new equipment training, and engineering change proposals." It had a maximum ceiling of US$92 million and an ordering period running through 14 August 2035.

=== Design and fielding ===
LMT's MRGG-A is based on the MARS-H family, an AR-10-style rifle platform. The MRGG-A configuration has a 14.5-inch barrel, a monolithic Picatinny rail on the upper receiver, M-LOK accessory attachment points on the handguard, ambidextrous controls, and fully automatic fire capability. The Mk 24 MRGG-A can be configured for 7.62x51mm NATO or 6.5mm Creedmoor through a quick-change barrel system. In May 2026, SOCOM's program manager for Special Operations Forces Lethality said that the command had begun procuring the assaulter variant but had not yet fielded it. Later that month, a SOCOM spokesperson told Task & Purpose that the Mk 24 was in production, would replace the Mk 17 SCAR-H, and was expected to begin fielding during fiscal year 2026.

== Optics ==
In 2021, Nightforce Optics announced a SOCOM contract for ATACR 4-20x50 F1 telescopic sights to support multiple systems in SOCOM service, including the MRGG. In U.S. service, these optics are also referred to as Ranging-Variable Power Scopes. LMT has shown MRGG-A rifles fitted with Nightforce optics.

== See also ==
- FN SCAR
- Next Generation Squad Weapon
