= .30 Thompson Center =

Rifle cartridge

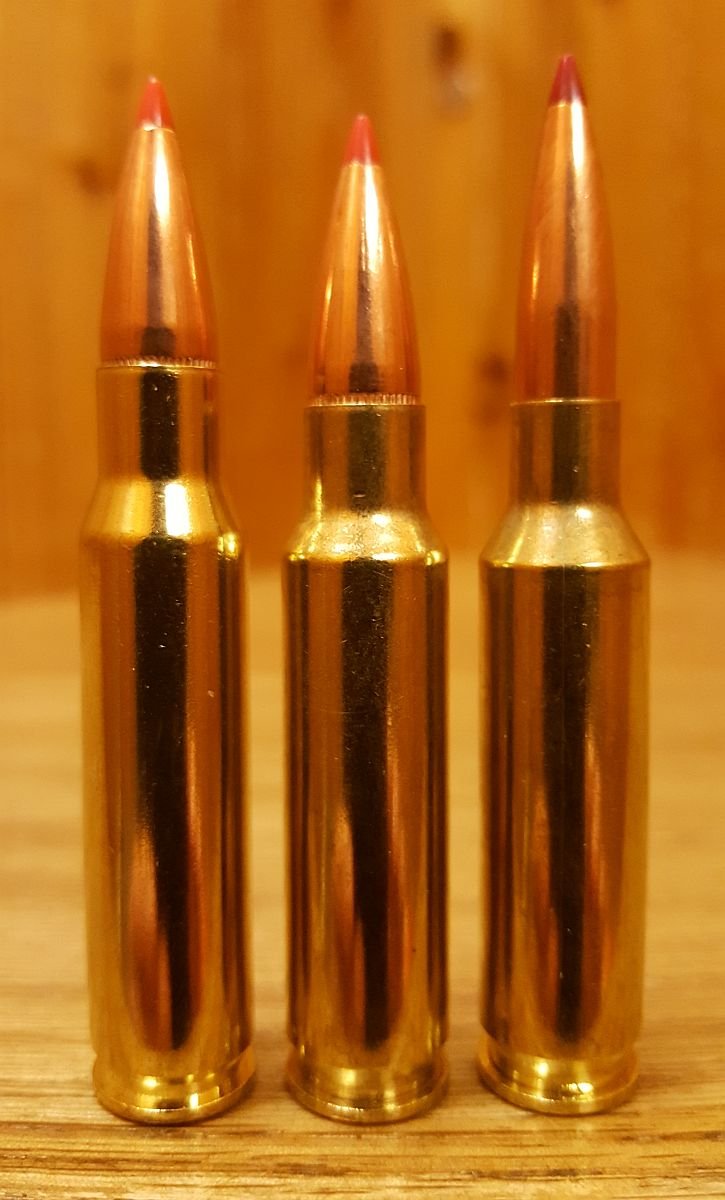
- .30 TC (center) compared to .308 Winchester (left) and 6.5mm Creedmoor (right)
- Place of origin: United States

Production history
- Manufacturer: Hornady
- Produced: 2007

Specifications
- Case type: Rimless
- Bullet diameter: 7.62 mm (0.300 in)
- Neck diameter: 8.56 mm (0.337 in)
- Shoulder diameter: 11.78 mm (0.464 in)
- Base diameter: 11.95 mm (0.470 in)
- Rim diameter: 12.01 mm (0.473 in)
- Rim thickness: 1.37 mm (0.054 in)
- Case length: 48.77 mm (1.920 in)
- Overall length: 67.56 mm (2.660 in)
- Case capacity: 3.50 cm^{3} (54.0 gr H_{2}O)
- Rifling twist: 305 mm (1 in 12")
- Maximum pressure (C.I.P.): 425.00 MPa (61,641 psi)

Ballistic performance
Bullet mass/type	Velocity	Energy
150 gr (10 g) SST	3,000 ft/s (910 m/s)	2,997 ft⋅lbf (4,063 J)
165 gr (11 g) SST	2,850 ft/s (870 m/s)	2,975 ft⋅lbf (4,034 J)

The .30 Thompson Center (7.62×48 mm), designated 30 THOMPSON CENTER by SAAMI, 30 TC by the C.I.P., is a centerfire rifle cartridge developed for Thompson Center Arms by Hornady intended to deliver .30-06 Springfield performance in a .308 Winchester length round.

The cartridge was initially offered in the Icon series of bolt-action rifles in 2007, which were released at the same time. While ballistic performance was as expected, consumer acceptance was low and the round has not achieved commercial success. The 6.5mm Creedmoor cartridge was created by necking down the .30 Thompson Center, and has achieved widespread popularity.

== Overview ==
As it has been understood that propellant burns more efficiently in shorter, wider-diameter casings, modern ammunition has changed over time to become shorter and wider than previous cartridges.

The .30 TC (0.308 in (7.8 mm) x 1.920 in (48.8 mm) is a non-magnum that is somewhat shorter and wider than the .308 and .30-06. The .30 TC has speed and energy equal to the .30-06.

All three cartridges weigh approximately the same, but the .30 TC produces less recoil. The case length of the .30 TC is 1.92 inches. Although it is somewhat shorter than the .308, the .30 TC fires a 150-grain SST bullet nearly 200 fps faster. The .30 TC also propels the 150-grain SST faster than the 2.494" .30-06.

When loaded with the 165-grain SST bullets, the .30 TC has a 50 fps advantage over the .30-06, which has a velocity of 2,850 fps.
