= FN SCAR =

Family of rifles manufactured by FN Herstal

- SCAR-L (top) and SCAR-H (bottom)
- Type: Assault rifle (SCAR-L); Battle rifle (SCAR-H); Squad automatic weapon (HAMR); Designated marksman rifle (Mk 20 SSR)
- Place of origin: Belgium/United States

Service history
- In service: 2009–present
- Used by: See Users
- Wars: War in Afghanistan (2001–2021); Iraq War; Mexican drug war Yemeni Civil War; Conflict in Najran, Jizan and Asir; Russo-Ukrainian War; M23 offensive Internal Conflict in Peru

Production history
- Designer: FN Herstal
- Designed: 2004
- Manufacturer: FN Manufacturing, LLC
- Produced: 2004–present (Military); 2004–2025 (Civilian)
- Variants: See Variants

Specifications
- Mass: 3.29 kg (7.3 lb) (SCAR-L); 3.58 kg (7.9 lb) (SCAR-H)
- Length: 889 mm (35.0 in) stock extended, 635 mm (25.0 in) stock folded (SCAR-L); 965 mm (38.0 in) stock extended, 711 mm (28.0 in) stock folded (SCAR-H)
- Barrel length: 355 mm (14.0 in) (SCAR-L); 400 mm (16 in) (SCAR-H)
- Cartridge: 5.56×45mm NATO (SCAR-L, SCAR PDW, SCAR-HAMR); 7.62×51mm NATO (SCAR-H, Mk 20 SSR); 6.5mm Creedmoor (Mk 20 SSR).300 Blackout (SCAR-SC)
- Action: Short-stroke gas-operated piston system, rotating bolt
- Rate of fire: SCAR-H: 550 rounds/min; SCAR-L: 650 rounds/min
- Muzzle velocity: SCAR-L: 870 m/s (2,900 ft/s); SCAR-H: 710 m/s (2,300 ft/s)
- Effective firing range: SCAR-L: 500 m (550 yd); SCAR-H: 600 m (660 yd)
- Feed system: SCAR-L: 30-round STANAG box magazines; SCAR-H: 20-round box magazine; SCAR-20S: 10-round box magazine
- Sights: Iron sights and Picatinny rail for various optical sights

The FN SCAR (Special Operations Forces Combat Assault Rifle) is a family of gas-operated short-stroke gas piston automatic rifles developed by Belgian manufacturer FN Herstal (FN) in 2004. It is constructed with modularity for the United States Special Operations Command (SOCOM) to satisfy the requirements of the SCAR competition. This family of rifles consists of two main types. The SCAR-L, for "light", is chambered in 5.56×45mm NATO and the SCAR-H, for "heavy", is chambered in 7.62×51mm NATO. Both types are available in Close Quarters Combat (CQC), Standard (STD), and Long Barrel (LB) variants.

In early 2004, SOCOM issued a solicitation for a family of Special Operations Forces Combat Assault Rifles, the so-called SCAR, designed around two different calibers but featuring high commonality of parts and identical ergonomics. The SCAR system completed low rate initial production testing in June 2007. After some delays, the first rifles began to be issued to operational units in April 2009, and a battalion of the U.S. 75th Ranger Regiment was the first large unit deployed into combat with 600 of the rifles in 2009.

The U.S. Special Operations Command later cancelled their purchase of the SCAR-L and planned to remove the rifle from their inventory by 2013. However, they will continue to purchase the SCAR-H version, and also plan to purchase 5.56mm conversion kits for the SCAR-H, allowing it to substitute for the SCAR-L. As of 2015, the SCAR was in service in over 20 countries.

On October 16, 2025, FN America announced that it had completed the final production run of all civilian-market SCAR rifles, with the exception of the SCAR 15P. The company stated that spare parts, including barrel assemblies, magazines, and other accessories, would remain available for a "period of time." FN America also confirmed that service support for existing owners would continue during this "period of time." The announcement indicated that additional information regarding future FN products would be released ahead of the 2026 SHOT Show. On January 15, 2026, FN America announced an upgrade to SCAR rifles featuring M-LOK rails, a lengthened receiver, and a hydraulically buffed bolt carrier.

== Overview ==
The SCAR is manufactured in two main versions: the SCAR-L ("Light") and SCAR-H ("Heavy"). The SCAR-L fires 5.56×45mm NATO rounds from STANAG magazines. The SCAR-H fires the more powerful 7.62×51mm NATO cartridge. Varied barrel lengths are also available for different purposes, such as close quarters battle or long-range engagements. The initial solicitation indicated that the SCAR-H would also be capable of being chambered in the 7.62×39mm M43 Kalashnikov cartridge, as well as the 6.8mm Remington SPC cartridge, however, FN is not currently offering this configuration, and the models have likely been cancelled.

The SCAR-L, designated Mk 16 by USSOCOM, was intended to replace the M4A1, the Mk 18 CQBR and the Mk 12 Special Purpose Rifle that had been in service (before SOCOM decided to cancel the order for the Mk 16 Mod 0, see below), whereas the Mk 17 (SCAR-H) had been intended to replace the M14 rifle and Mk 11 sniper rifles in use. However, the SCAR will only supplement the other rifles, issuance remains of the operator's discretion.

The semi-automatic only Mk 20 Mod 0 Sniper Support Rifle (SSR) is based on the SCAR-H. It includes a longer receiver, a strengthened barrel extension and barrel profile to reduce whip and improve accuracy, and an enhanced modular trigger that can be configured for single-stage or two-stage operation together with either a folding or a non-folding precision stock.

The SCAR has two receivers: The lower is constructed of polymer, and the upper receiver is one piece and constructed of aluminum. The SCAR features an integral, uninterrupted Picatinny rail on the top of the aluminium receiver, two removable side rails and a bottom one that can mount any MIL-STD-1913 compliant accessories. The lower receiver is designed with an M16 compatible pistol grip, flared magazine well, and raised area around the magazine and bolt release buttons. The front sight flips down for unobstructed use of optics and accessories. The rifle uses a "tappet" type of closed gas system much like the M1 carbine while the bolt carrier otherwise resembles the Stoner 63 or Heckler & Koch G36.

The SCAR is built at the FN Manufacturing, LLC plant in Columbia, South Carolina, in the United States. Since 2008, FN Herstal has been offering semi-automatic versions of the SCAR rifles for commercial and law enforcement use. These are dubbed the 16S (Light) and 17S (Heavy), and are manufactured in Herstal, Belgium, and imported by FN Herstal's U.S. subsidiary, FN America of Fredericksburg, Virginia. FN America slightly modifies the rifles (supplying a U.S. made magazine and machining a pin in the magazine well) to be in compliance with U.S. Code before selling them.

The FN SCAR 20S Precision Rifle was introduced in 2019. It is a semi-automatic only civilian version of the FN Mk 20 SSR.

In 2020, the FN SCAR 20S 6.5CM variant was announced chambered in 6.5mm Creedmoor. This chambering has been selected by USSOCOM for long-range use.

=== Enhanced Grenade Launcher Module ===
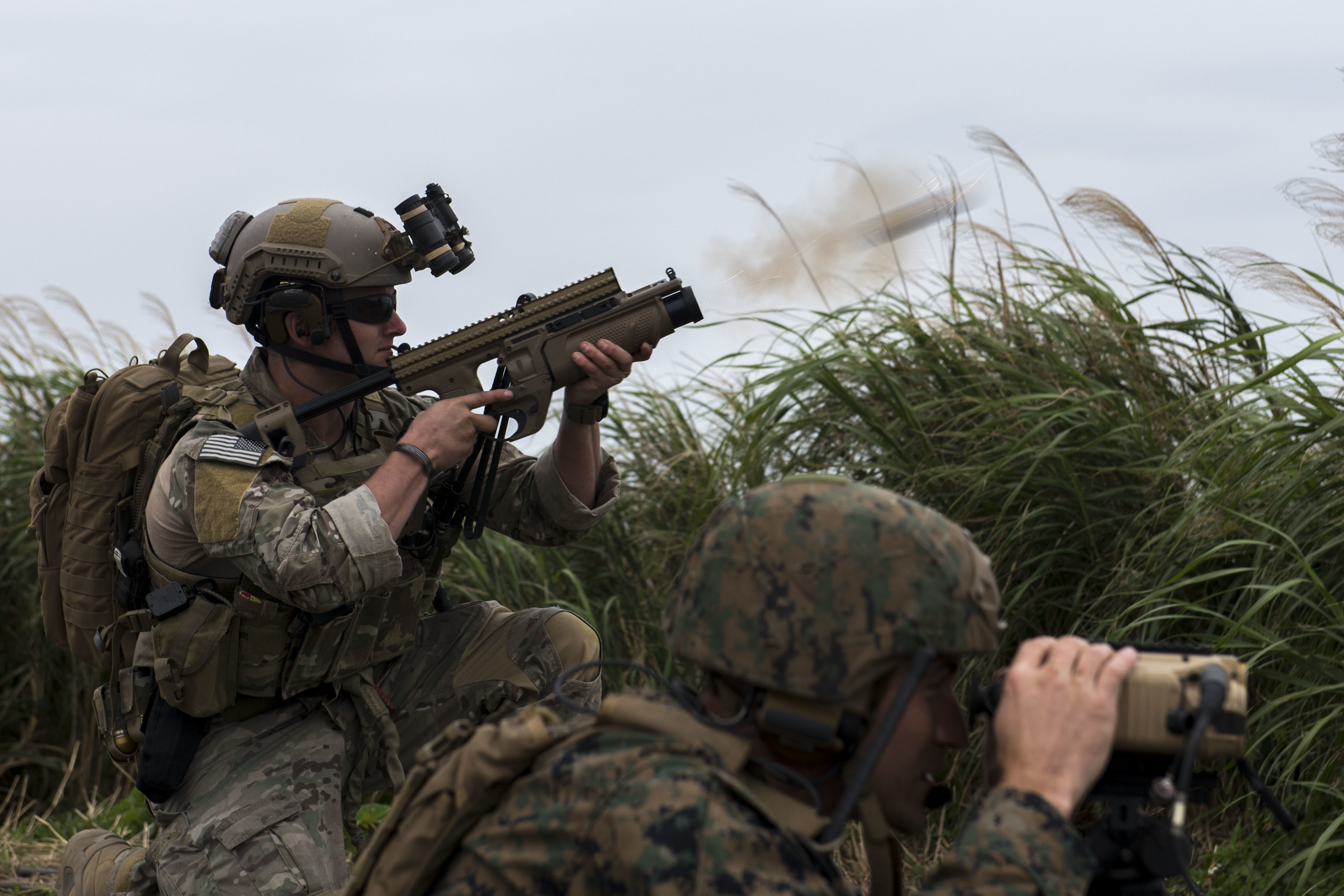
A stand-alone EGLM being fired

Introduced in 2004 as an addition, the Enhanced Grenade Launching Module (EGLM), officially referred to as the FN40GL, or Mk 13 Mod 0, is a 40 mm grenade launcher based on the GL1 designed for the F2000. The FN40GL is marketed in both an L (Light) and H (Heavy) model, for fitting the appropriate SCAR variant. The EGLM system features a double-action trigger and a swing-out chamber. These offer two advantages over the M203 system, the first being that the launcher does not need to be re-cocked if the grenade does not fire, and the latter being that longer grenades can be used. Like the M203, the FN40GL uses the same High–Low Propulsion System.

The FN40GL is deemed a third-generation grenade launcher, meaning it is multifunctional: it can be used mounted to the rifle or as a stand-alone system; it is manufactured using a number of materials like aluminum, composites, and polymers; the breech opens to the side for use of longer 40 mm rounds, including less-than-lethal; and it is mounted on the bottom accessory rail instead of requiring specialized mounting hardware. The FN40GL is attached to SCAR rifles on the bottom rail with a trigger adapter and dual locking clamp levers on the launcher, limiting the ability to integrate with other rifles. Barrel length is 240 mm (9.6 in), and is unique in that it is the only system where the barrel can swivel to the left or right for loading, while other breech-loading launchers pivot specifically to one side. This enhances its ambidexterity, making it easy for a left-handed operator to load under fire. The standalone stock assembly has the FN40GL mounted to the bottom rail as with the rifle, but still has 3 o'clock, 6 o'clock, and 9 o'clock rail positions for other accessories. This is mainly during non-lethal uses for other mounted additions like LED lights and laser dazzlers. The trigger is placed lower than normal for operation with the user's middle finger while keeping their trigger finger free to use the rifle. The double-action trigger is long and heavy to prevent easily and unintentionally firing a round under stress. It can fire the Pike 40 mm guided munition.

=== FNAC ===
In July 2007, the United States Army announced a limited competition between the M4 carbine, FN SCAR, HK416, and the previously shelved HK XM8. Ten examples of each of the four competitors were involved. During the testing, 6,000 rounds apiece were fired from each of the carbines in an "extreme dust environment". The purpose of the shoot-off was to assess future needs, not to select a replacement for the M4.

During the test, the SCAR suffered 226 stoppages. Since a percentage of each weapons' stoppages were caused by magazine failures, the FN SCAR, HK XM8 and HK416 performed statistically similarly. The FN SCAR ranked second to the XM8 with 127 stoppages, but with fewer stoppages compared to the M4 with 882 stoppages and the HK416 with 233. This test was based on two previous systems assessments that were conducted using the M4 carbine and M16 rifle at Aberdeen Proving Ground in 2006 and the summer of 2007 before the third limited competition in the fall of 2007. The 2006 test focused only on the M4 and M16. The Summer 2007 test had only the M4 but increased lubrication. Results from the second test resulted in a total of 307 stoppages for the M4 after lubrication was increased, but did not explain why the M4 suffered 882 stoppages with that same level of lubrication in the third test.

The SCAR was one of the weapons displayed to U.S. Army officials during an invitation-only Industry Day on 13 November 2008. The goal of the Industry Day was to review current carbine technology for any situation prior to writing formal requirements for a future replacement for the M4 carbine.

The SCAR was one of the competing weapons in the Individual Carbine competition which aimed to find a replacement for the M4 carbine. A variant of the SCAR was entered into the competition, known as the FNAC (FN Advanced Carbine). The weapon is similar to the SCAR Mk 16 Mod 0 but with modifications including a 140 g (0.3 lb) weight reduction resulting in a loaded weight of 3.61 kg (7.95 lb), a bayonet lug for an M9 bayonet (which the Mk 16 does not have), a rail mounted folding front iron sight instead of the gas block mounted sight, and a non-reciprocating charging handle. The competition was cancelled before a winner was chosen.

=== HAMR IAR ===
In 2008, a variant of the FN SCAR—the Heat Adaptive Modular Rifle (HAMR)—was one of four finalist rifles for the Infantry Automatic Rifle (IAR) competition. The IAR was a United States Marine Corps requirement for a lightweight automatic rifle for squad automatic rifle use. The FN entry was different from existing SCAR versions in that it combined closed bolt operation (fires from bolt forward/chambered cartridge) with open bolt operation (fires from bolt to the rear, no chambered cartridge), switching automatically from closed to open bolt as the weapon's barrel heats up during firing. There have been previous firearms with mixed open/closed bolt operation, but the automatic temperature-based operating mode switch is an innovation. The IAR competition was expected to result in Marine Corps procurement of up to 6,500 automatic rifles over five years, but eventually the SCAR HAMR was passed over in favor of the Heckler & Koch HK416, later designated as the M27 Infantry Automatic Rifle.

== Adoption ==
=== Acceptance of the FN SCAR in the U.S. military ===
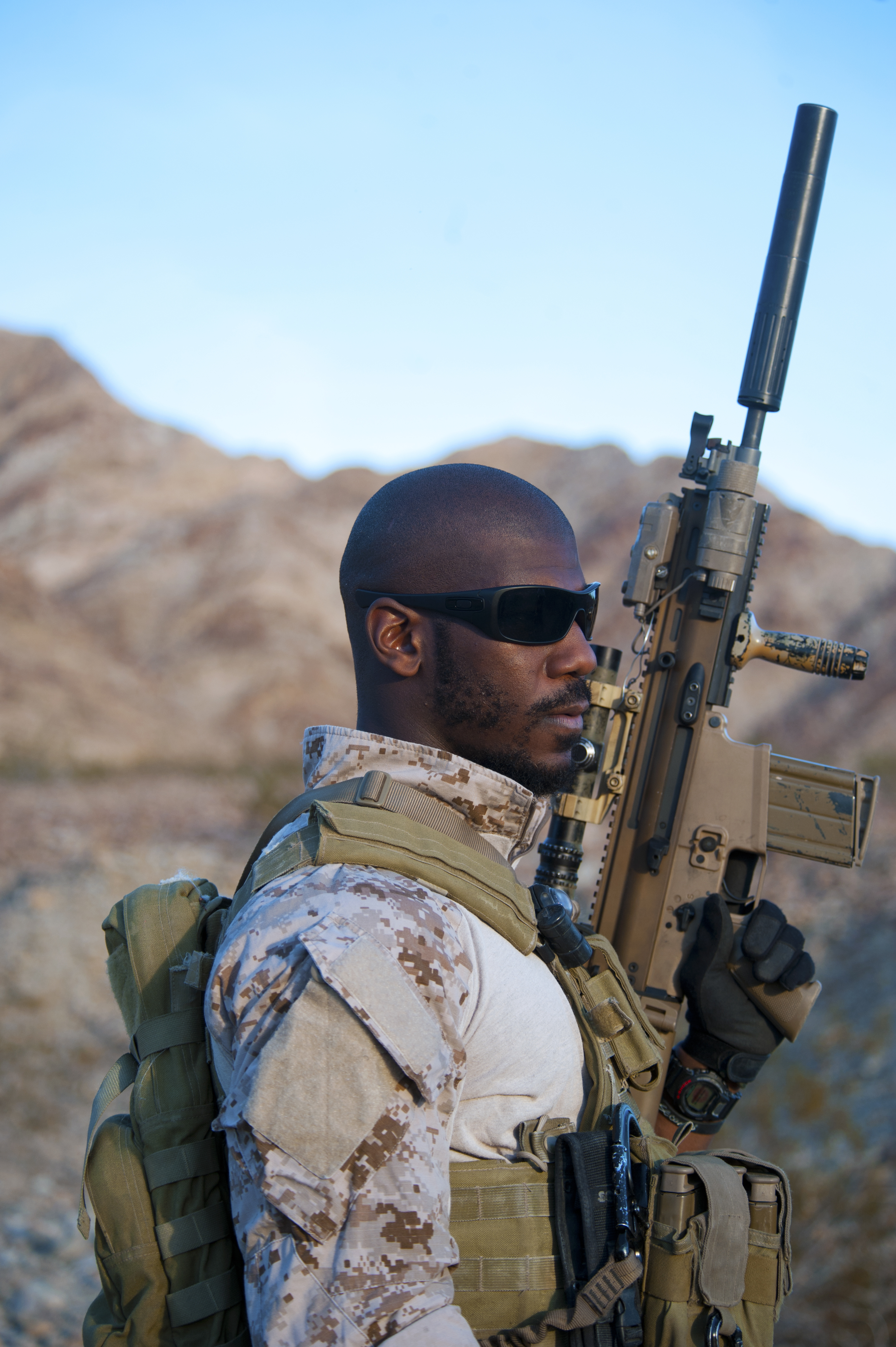
U.S. Navy SEAL with a SCAR-H CQC (Mk 17)

On 4 May 2010, a press release on FN America's official website announced the SCAR Acquisition Decision Memorandum was finalized on 14 April 2010, moving the SCAR program to the Milestone C phase. This was an approval for the entire weapons family of the SCAR-L, SCAR-H, and the Enhanced Grenade Launcher Module.

The Mk 16 has a rate of fire of 625 rounds per minute while the Mk 17 has a rate of fire of 600 rounds per minute. This was done to improve control during fully automatic fire.

In late October 2010, SOCOM approved full-rate production of the Mk 20 sniper variant of the SCAR, with fielding beginning in mid-May 2011.

=== Cancellation of procurement of the Mk 16 ===
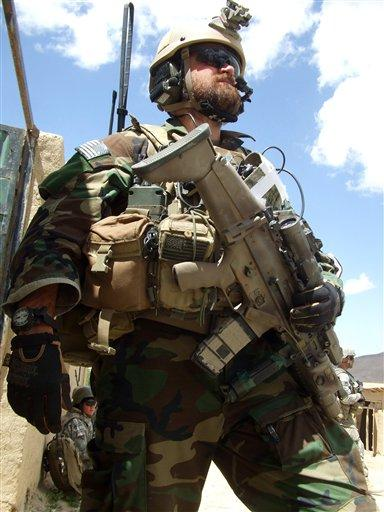
U.S. Air Force Special Tactics Officer with the SCAR-L (Mk 16) in Afghanistan

On 25 June 2010, SOCOM announced that it was cancelling the acquisition of the Mk 16, citing limited funds and a lack of enough of a performance difference in comparison to other 5.56mm rifles to justify the purchase. Remaining funds would be expended for the SCAR-H and the Mk 20 sniper variant. At the time, SOCOM had bought 850 Mk 16s and 750 Mk 17s. SOCOM had operators turn in their Mk 16s and is not keeping them in the inventory, but started developing a conversion kit for the Mk 17 to make it capable of firing 5.56mm rounds.

"FN America believes the issue is not whether the SCAR, and specifically the [originally contracted] Mk 16 variant, is the superior weapon system available today...it has already been proven to be just that...recently passing Milestone C and determined to be operationally effective / operationally suitable (OE/OS) for fielding. The issue is whether or not the requirement for a 5.56mm replacement outweighs the numerous other requirements competing for the customers' limited budget. That is a question that will only be determined by the customer". FN Herstal, though, had refuted that the Mk 16 was being dropped from the inventory and stated that the 5.56mm variant will be retained by SOCOM, and that "The choice between the 5.56mm and the 7.62mm caliber will be left to the discretion of each constitutive component of USSOCOM's Joint Command (e.g. SEALs, Rangers, Army Special Forces, MARSOC, AFSOC) depending on their specific missions on today's battlefield".

FN America's claim contradicted the official announcement from SOCOM and they did not reverse their decision. SOCOM decided to procure the 7.62mm Mk 17 rifle, the 40mm Mk 13 grenade launcher, and the 7.62mm Mk 20 Sniper Support Rifle variants of the Special Operations Forces Combat Assault Rifle (SCAR) manufactured by FN. SOCOM would not purchase the 5.56mm Mk 16. At that point the individual service component commands within SOCOM (Army Special Operations Command, Naval Special Warfare Command, Air Force Special Operations Command, and Marine Corps Forces Special Operations Command) would or would not still buy the 5.56mm Mk 16 SCAR for some or all of their respective subordinate units even with overall US Special Operations Command opting not to.

=== Modifying the Mk 17 ===
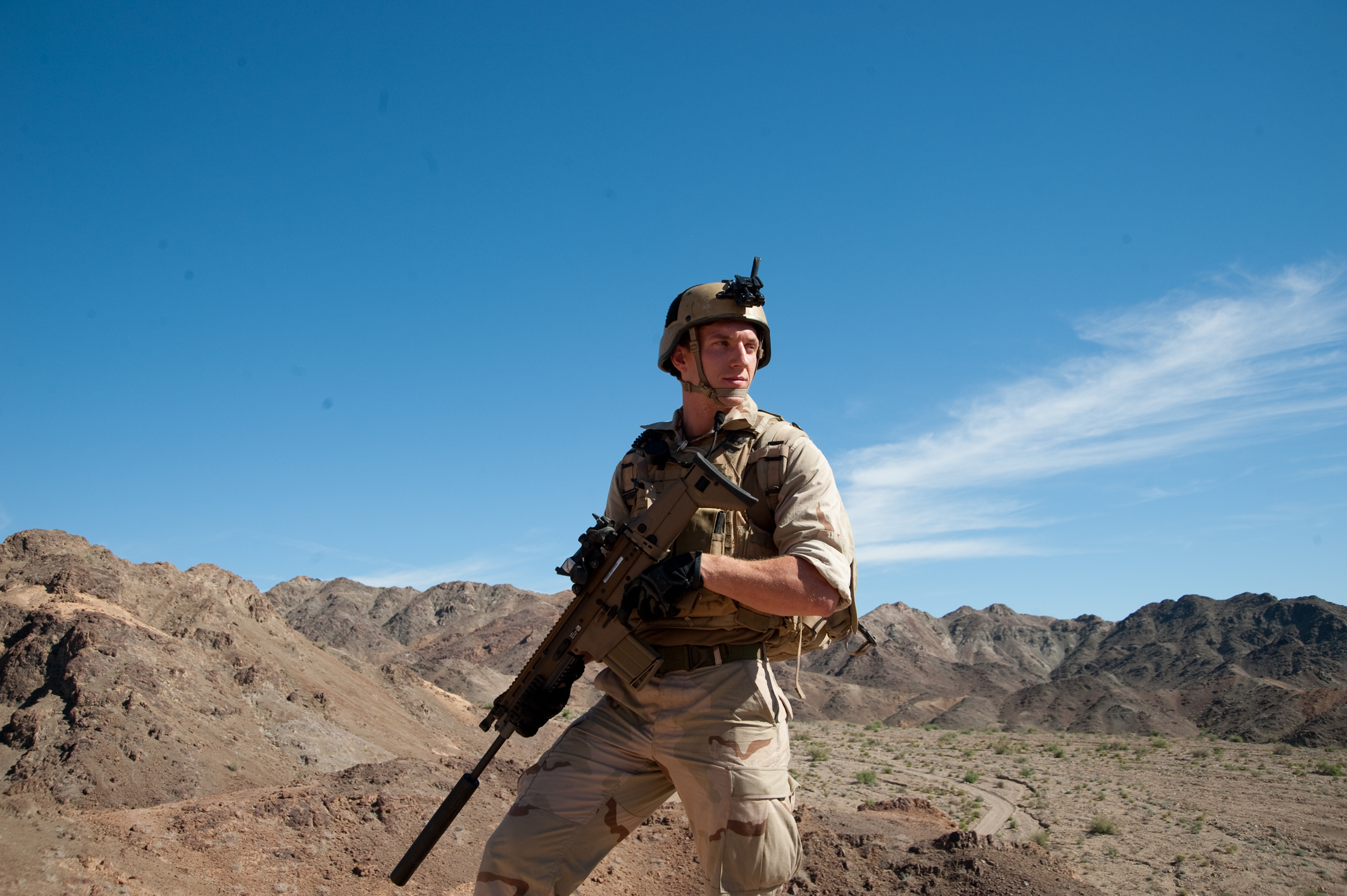
U.S. Navy SEALs conducting training with the FN SCAR-H STD (Mk 17) with a suppressor

SOCOM began removing the Mk 16 from its inventory at the end of 2011, and most units have had the rifle removed from service post-2013. To maintain the SCAR as a small-caliber weapon, they are procuring conversion kits for the Mk 17 battle rifle to make it fire 5.56×45mm rounds. The presolicitation for the SCAR program originally called for one rifle that could be adapted to fire multiple calibers including 5.56mm, 7.62×51mm, and 7.62×39mm. When requirements were finalized, the decision was made to separate the 5.56×45mm and 7.62×51mm weapons because converting the medium caliber rifle to fire small caliber bullets created an assault rifle heavier than the M4 carbine. After fielding, operators reversed the previous decision and called for a SCAR that could change calibers. The Mk 17 was chosen to be scaled down because it had a larger receiver for the 7.62×51mm round, and so the 5.56mm Mk 16 could not be scaled up to chamber the larger round. The 5.56mm conversion kit was finalized in late 2010 and orders began in mid-2011.

On 9 December 2011, the Naval Surface Warfare Center Crane Division released a sole source five year indefinite delivery/indefinite quantity procurement notice for the Mk 16 Mod 0 (SCAR-L), Mk 17 Mod 0 (SCAR-H), Mk 20 Mod 0 (SSR), and Mk 13 Mod 0 (40mm EGLM) from FN to sustain inventory levels. Navy special operations forces procures their firearms through SOCOM and fielded the MK 16 more than any other unit.

The Mk 17 was in widespread use by American SOF units in Afghanistan, where its relative light weight, accuracy and stopping power has proved of worth on the battlefield.

== Variants ==
=== Military variants ===
- SCAR-L (FN MK 16) – 5.56×45mm NATO assault rifle
- SCAR-L CQC (FN MK 16 CQC) (Close Quarter Combat) – 250 mm (10 in) barrel
- SCAR-L STD (FN MK 16) (Standard) – 360 mm (14 in) barrel
- SCAR-L LB (FN MK 16 LB) (Long Barrel) – 460 mm (18 in) barrel
- SCAR PDW – 5.56×45mm NATO personal defense weapon variant with a 170 mm (6.5 in) barrel length. No longer in production and was replaced by the SCAR-SC.
- SCAR-SC – 5.56×45mm NATO / .300 Blackout subcompact carbine. Weighs 3.1 kg (6.8 lb), has a 7.5 in (190 mm) inch barrel, an overall length of 25.7 in (650 mm) and a length of 21.1 in (540 mm) collapsed and has a pistol grip with no finger rest. It has a lower effective range of 200 m (220 yd). It became available in mid-2018.
- SCAR-H (FN MK 17 Mod 0) – 7.62×51mm NATO battle rifle
- SCAR-H CQC (FN MK 17 CQC) (Close Quarters Combat) – 330 mm (13 in) barrel
- SCAR-H STD (FN MK 17 Mod 0) (Standard) – 410 mm (16 in) barrel
- SCAR-H LB (FN MK 17 LB) (Long Barrel) – 510 mm (20 in) barrel

Precision Rifles - 7.62×51mm NATO

- FN SCAR-H PR (Precision Rifle) - 510 mm (20 in) barrel, two-stage match semi-auto trigger, folding stock, and M16A2 pistol grip.
- FN SCAR-H TPR (Tactical Precision Rifle) (FN MK 20 SSR (Sniper Support Rifle))- 510 mm (20 in) barrel, two-stage match semi-auto trigger, adjustable fixed stock, and M16A2 pistol grip.

==== Prototypes ====
- FNAC (FN Advanced Carbine) – 5.56 mm NATO assault rifle entered into the US Army Individual Carbine competition. The competition was cancelled before a winning weapon was chosen.
- HAMR IAR (Heat Adaptive Modular Rifle) – 5.56 mm NATO automatic rifle entered in the United States Marine Corps' Infantry Automatic Rifle competition, it was eventually beaten by the M27 Infantry Automatic Rifle, a Heckler & Koch HK416 variant.
- HAMR NGSW (Heat Adaptive Modular Rifle) – 6.8mm Federal Cartridge Company cartridge variant entered in the United States Army's Next Generation Squad Weapon Program competition, it was beaten by the M7 rifle, a SIG MCX Spear variant.
- Mk 17 Mod 1 6.5mm Creedmoor battle rifle entered in the SOCOM Mid-Range Gas Gun program.

=== Civilian variants ===
- SCAR 15P - 5.56×45mm NATO semi-automatic pistol version of the FN SCAR-SC. Offered in matte black or flat dark earth (brown) color.
- SCAR 16S – 5.56×45mm NATO semi-automatic version of FN Mk 16. Offered in matte black or flat dark earth color.
- SCAR 17S – 7.62×51mm NATO semi-automatic version of FN Mk 17. Offered in matte black or flat dark earth color.
- SCAR 20S – 7.62×51mm NATO semi-automatic version of FN Mk 20 SSR. Offered in matte black or flat dark earth color.
- SCAR 20S 6.5CM – 6.5mm Creedmoor semi-automatic version of FN Mk 20 SSR. Offered in matte black or flat dark earth color.

== Gallery ==
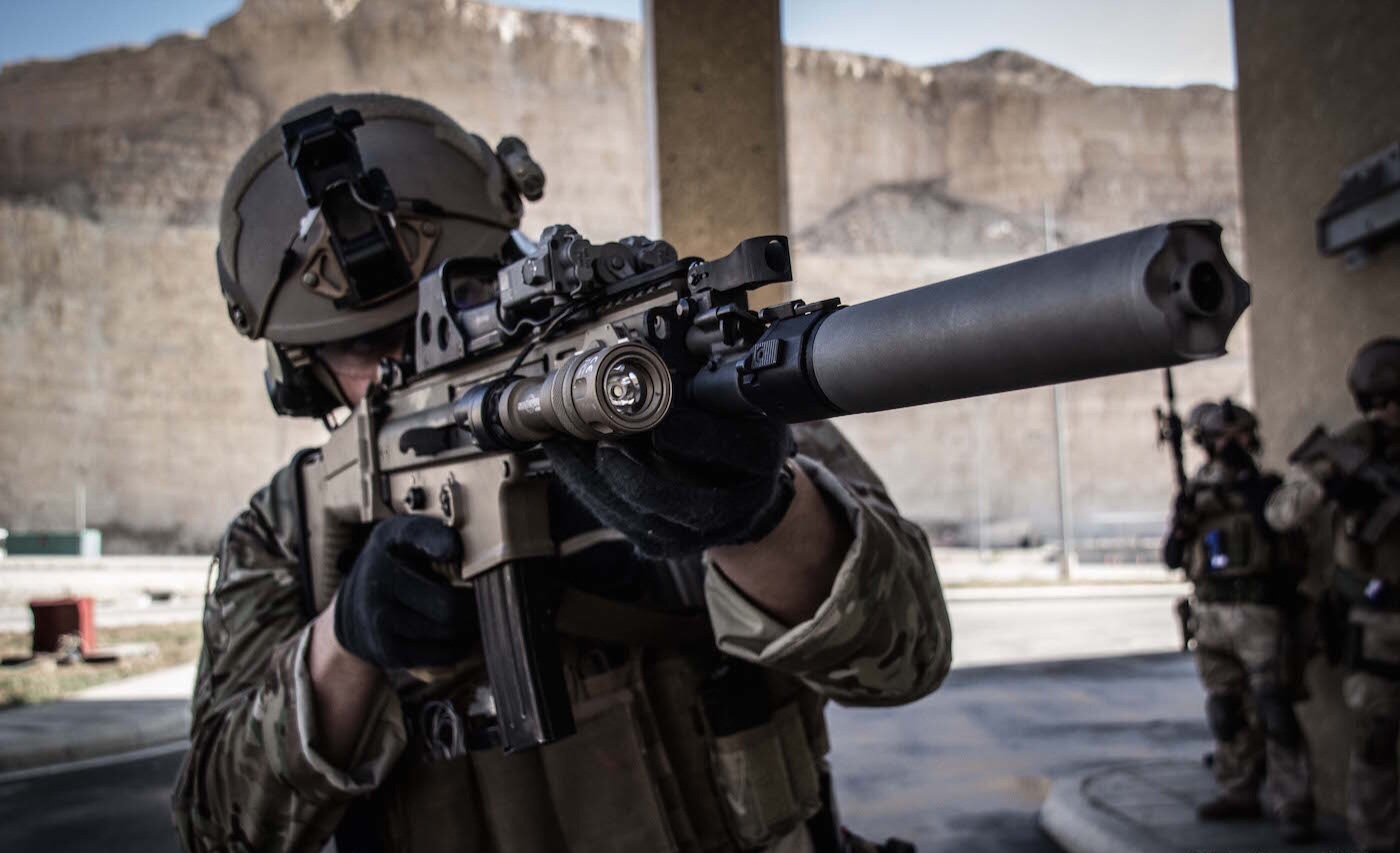
Belgian SFG soldier armed with the SCAR-L with a suppressor

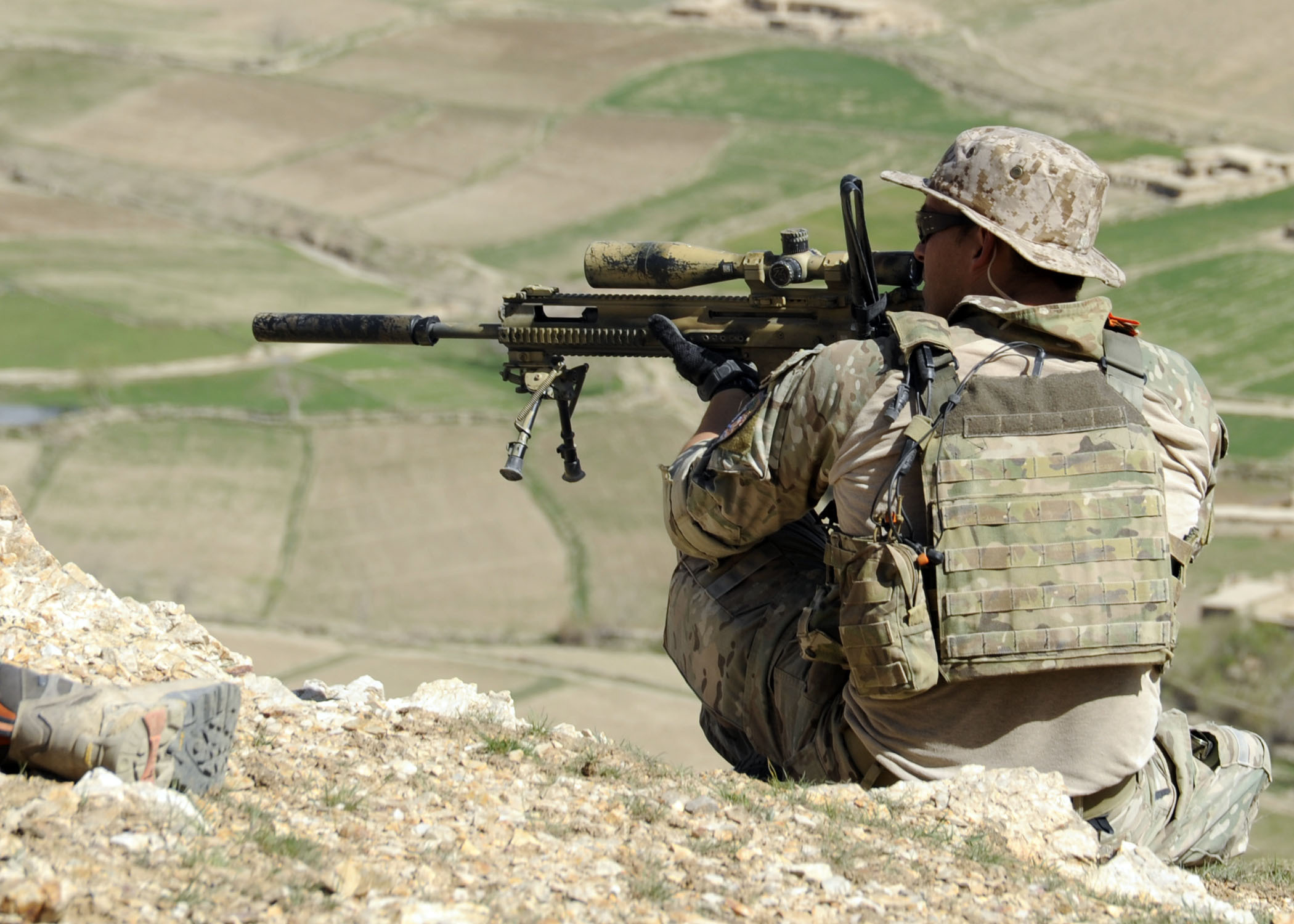
U.S. coalition SOF soldier with the Mk 20 Sniper Support Rifle (SSR)

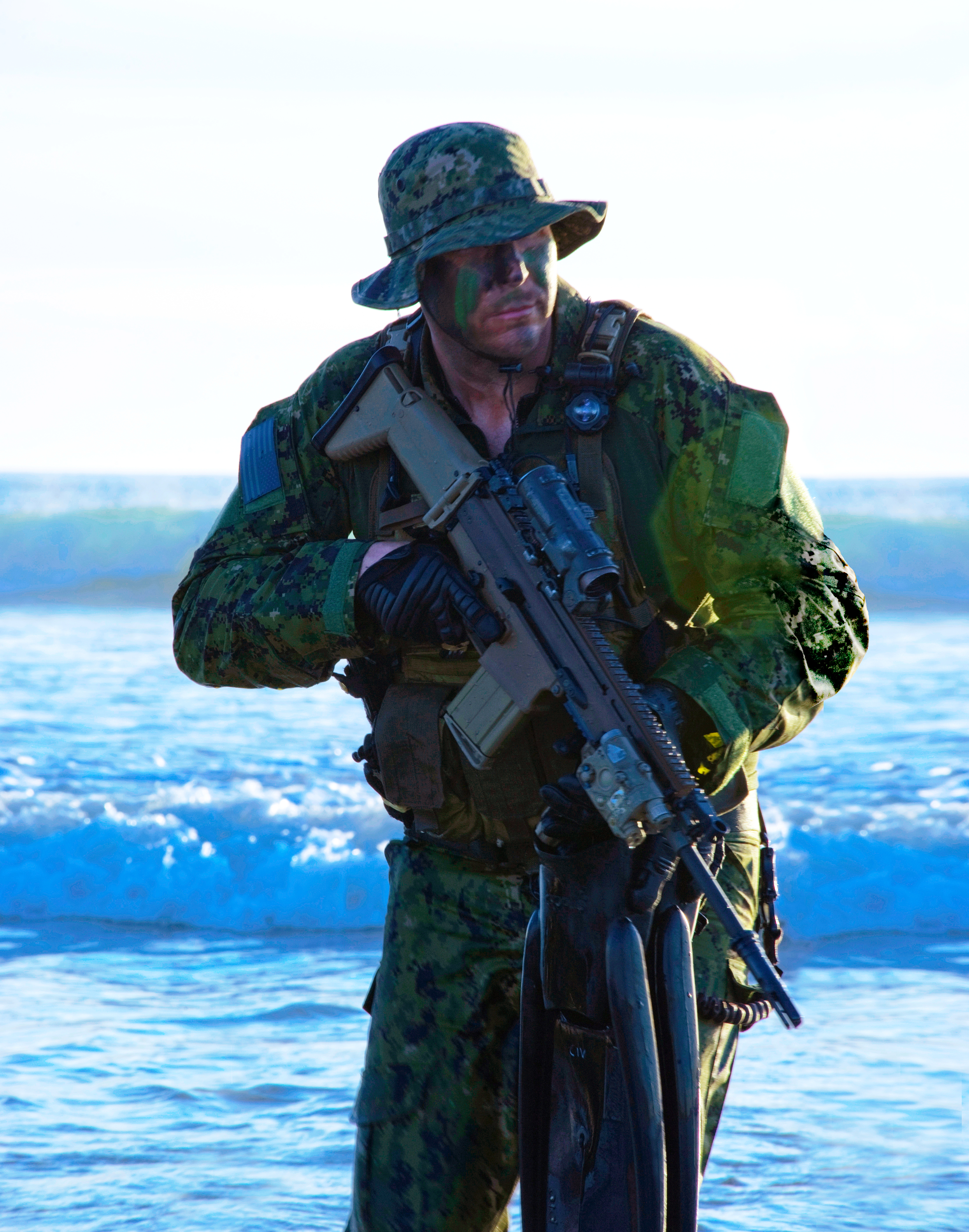
U.S. Navy SEAL with the SCAR-H STD (Mk 17)

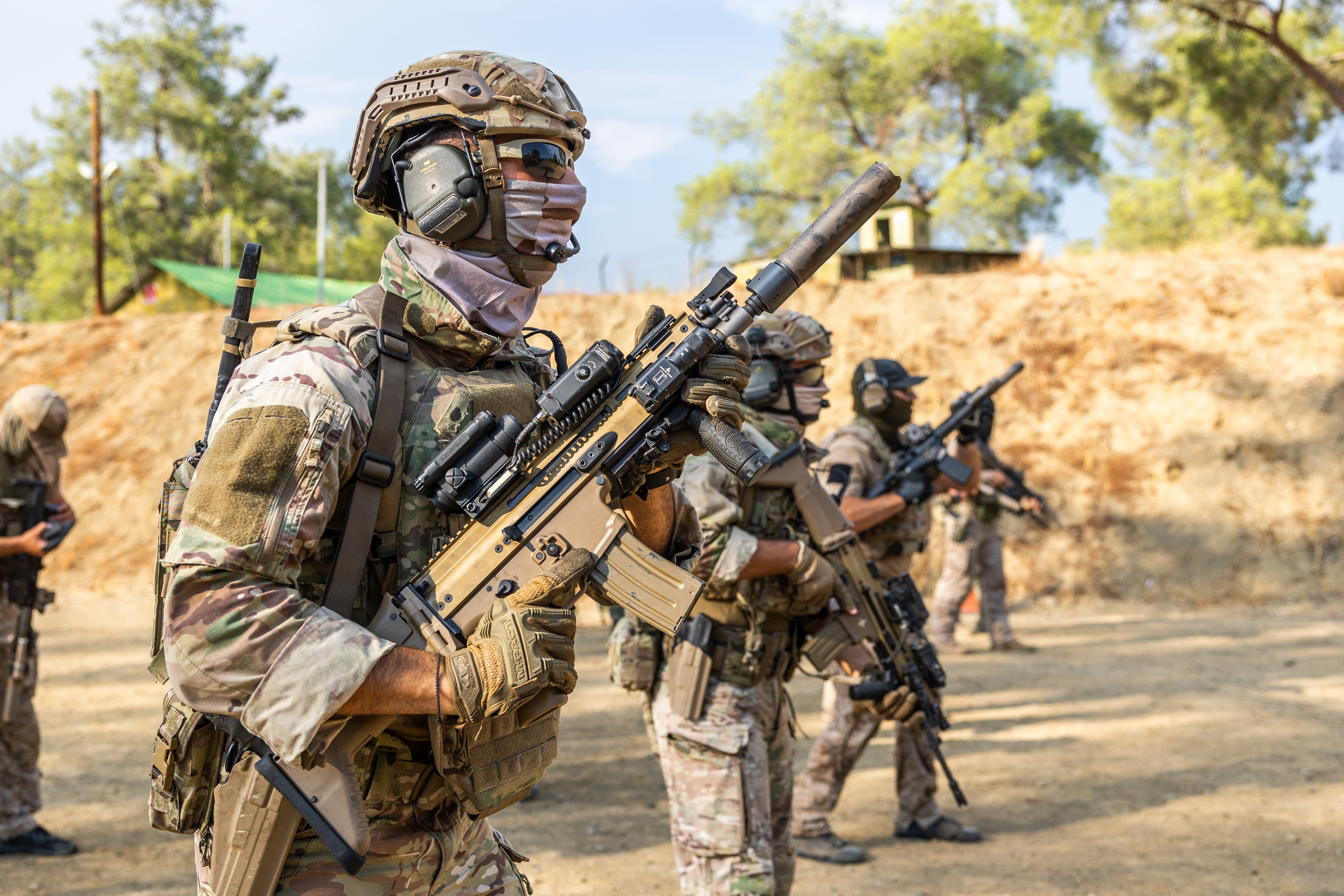
Soldiers of the Cypriot Special Forces using the SCAR-L during an exercise

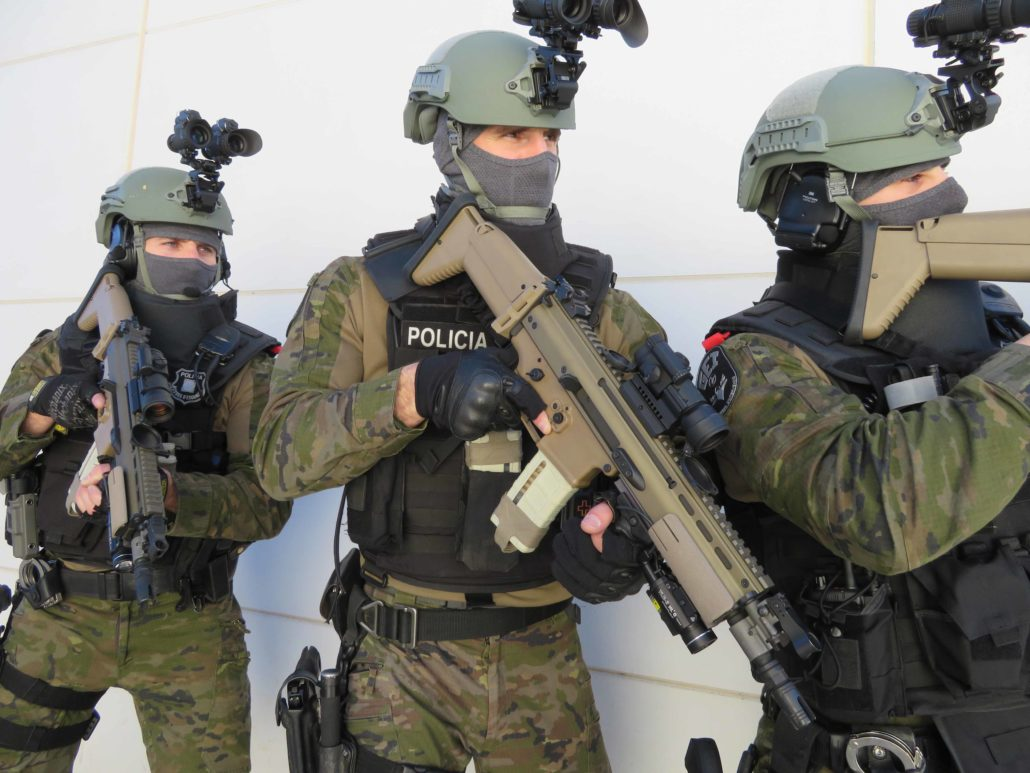
Three Catalan GEI operatives armed with SCAR-L CQC rifles

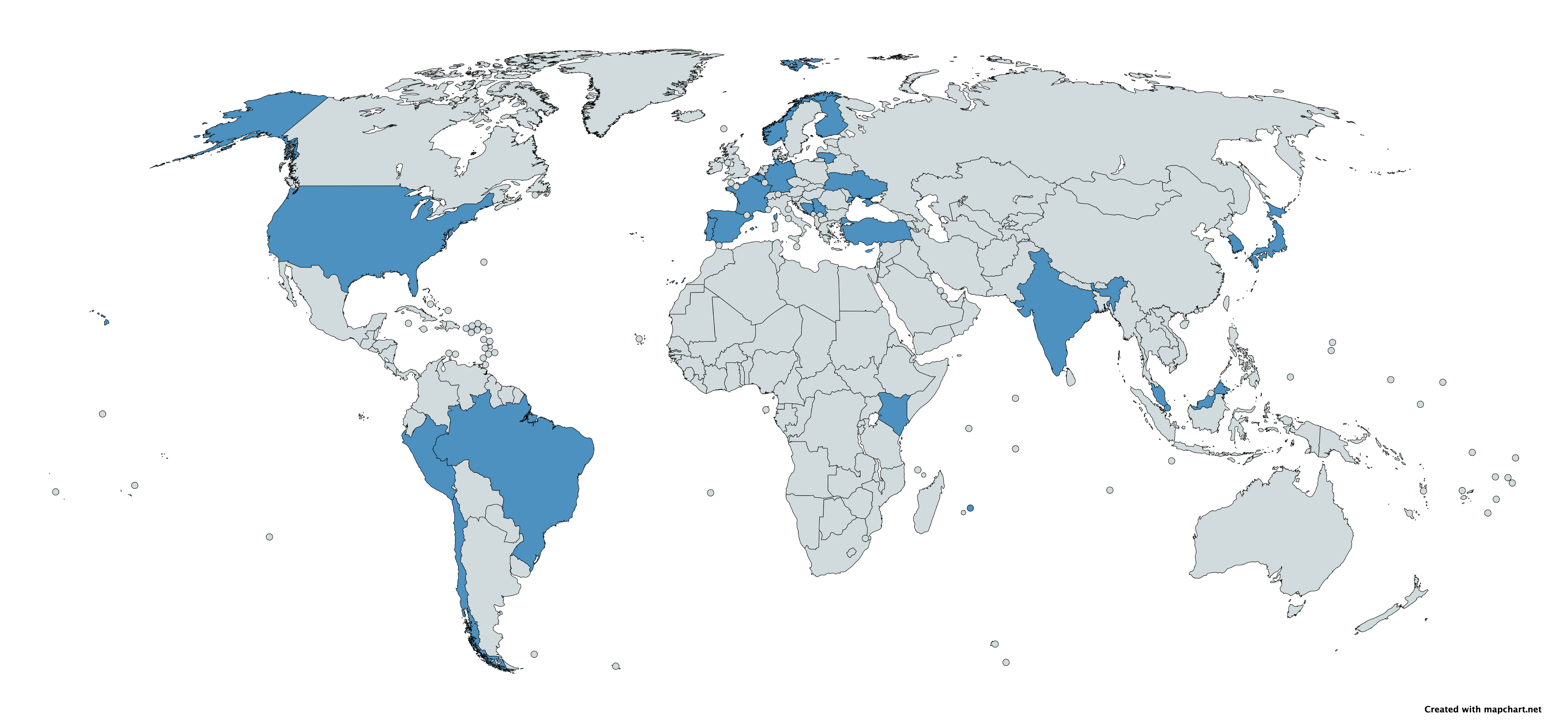
Map with FN SCAR users in blue

== Users ==
	Organization name	Model	Quantity	Date	Reference
Belgium	Federal Police (Belgium) and Local Police	SC	>1,500	2019–	
Belgium	Belgian Armed Forces replacing the FN FNC as service rifle	L, H, H-PR, SC, EGLM	13,827	2011–	
Bosnia and Herzegovina	SIPA, Federal Ministry of Internal Affairs, Sarajevo Canton and Zenica-Doboj Canton	L, L CQC	—	2012–	
Brazil	Military Police of São Paulo State	L, H	1,300	—	
Chile	Chilean Marine Corps	L, H	3,200	2013–	
Cyprus	National Guard-Special Forces	L, H (TPR)	—	—	
Finland	Special Jaegers	L	—	—	
France	Recherche Assistance Intervention Dissuasion (RAID) police unit	—	—	—	
France	Commandement des Opérations Spéciales (COS)	—	—	—	
France	Compagnie de Commandement et de Transmissions (CCT)	—	—	—	
France	Armée de terre	H PR	2600	2019	
Germany	GSG 9 counter-terrorist unit of the German Federal Police	L	—	—	
Germany	Mobiles Einsatzkommando (MEK) special units of the criminal investigation units of the German state police	—	—	—	
Germany	Spezialeinsatzkommando (SEK) special units of the German state police	—	—	—	
Germany	Bavarian State Police	L	888	2025	
India	Mainly Used by the Special Protection Group and other Indian special forces	L, H	—	—	
Indonesia	Combat Reconnaissance Platoon, elite special unit formation of the Indonesian Army	L	—		
Japan	Special Forces Group counter-terrorist unit of the Japan Ground Self-Defense Force	—	—	2014	
Kenya	Members of the Kenya SOCOM (Special Operations Command) use FN SCAR-H rifles as standard-issue rifle. The government has plans to make this rifle a standard issue for all military personnel over the next few years, replacing German HK G3 battle rifles and American M4 carbines.	H	≈1,000	—	
Lithuania	Lithuanian Land Force	H (PR)	—	2014–	
Malaysia	69 Commando (VAT 69) the Royal Malaysia Police	H	—	—	
Malaysia	Unit Gempur Marin (UNGERIN) maritime counter-terrorist unit of the Royal Malaysia Police	H	—	2017	
Mauritius	New standard service rifle of the Military of Mauritius	L, H	—	—	
Mauritius	Groupe d'intervention de la police Mauricienne (GIPM) unit of the Special Mobile Force	L, H	—	—	
Norway	Beredskapstroppen Delta of the Norwegian Police.	H	—	—	
Pakistan	Special Service Group	L, H	—	—	
Peru	Grupo de Fuerzas Especiales (GRUFE) of the Peruvian Armed Forces	L, H	—	2009–	
Peru	Peruvian Army	H	8,110	2013–	
Poland	Government Protection Bureau, later State Protection Service	L, H	—	2010–	
Portugal	Portuguese Army, as standard service rifle	L, H, H (PR)	15,940	2019	
Portugal	Prison Security and Intervention Group (GISP), special unit of the Portuguese Prison Guard	L	—	—	
Saudi Arabia	Armed Forces of Saudi Arabia	—	—	—	
Serbia	72nd Brigade for Special Operations Detachment of the Military Police "Cobras"	L L, H	740 —	2018; 2014	
Slovenia	Slovenian Army Special Forces The Slovenian Armed Forces will adopt the FN SCAR as its new standard assault rifle, replacing the previous FN F2000S. The first unit is the 10th Reconnaissance Battalion, which received the rifle in 2025.	L, H	—	—	
Singapore	Police Special Operations Command of the Singapore Police Force	L	—	—	
Singapore	Special Tactics and Rescue (S.T.A.R) of the Singapore Police Force	L	—	—	
Republic of Korea	707th Special Mission Group of the Korean Army	L	—	—	
Spain	Special Intervention Group (GEI) of the Mossos d'Esquadra (Catalan regional police)	L, H	—	2010	
Turkey	Turkish Land Forces	—	—	2010–	
United States	U.S. Armed Forces (used by all branches of USSOCOM Manufactured and provided by FN America)	H	—	—	
United States	U.S. Customs and Border Protection's Office of Air and Marine (OAM) interdiction unit	—	—	—	
United States	Cambridge Police Department (Massachusetts)	SSR	4	—	—
United States	Los Angeles Police Department (LAPD) SWAT	L, H	—	2010–	
Ukraine	Ukrainian Ground Forces Belarusian volunteer Kastuś Kalinoŭski Regiment	L	—	2022–	
Ukraine	National Guard of Ukraine	L	—	2023–	
Ukraine	Russian Volunteer Corps	L	—	2023–	

== See also ==
- Adaptive Combat Rifle
- AK-12
- Beretta ARX160
- CZ 805 BREN
- FB MSBS Grot
- List of assault rifles
- List of battle rifles
