= Ballistic table =

Prediction of a projectile's trajectory

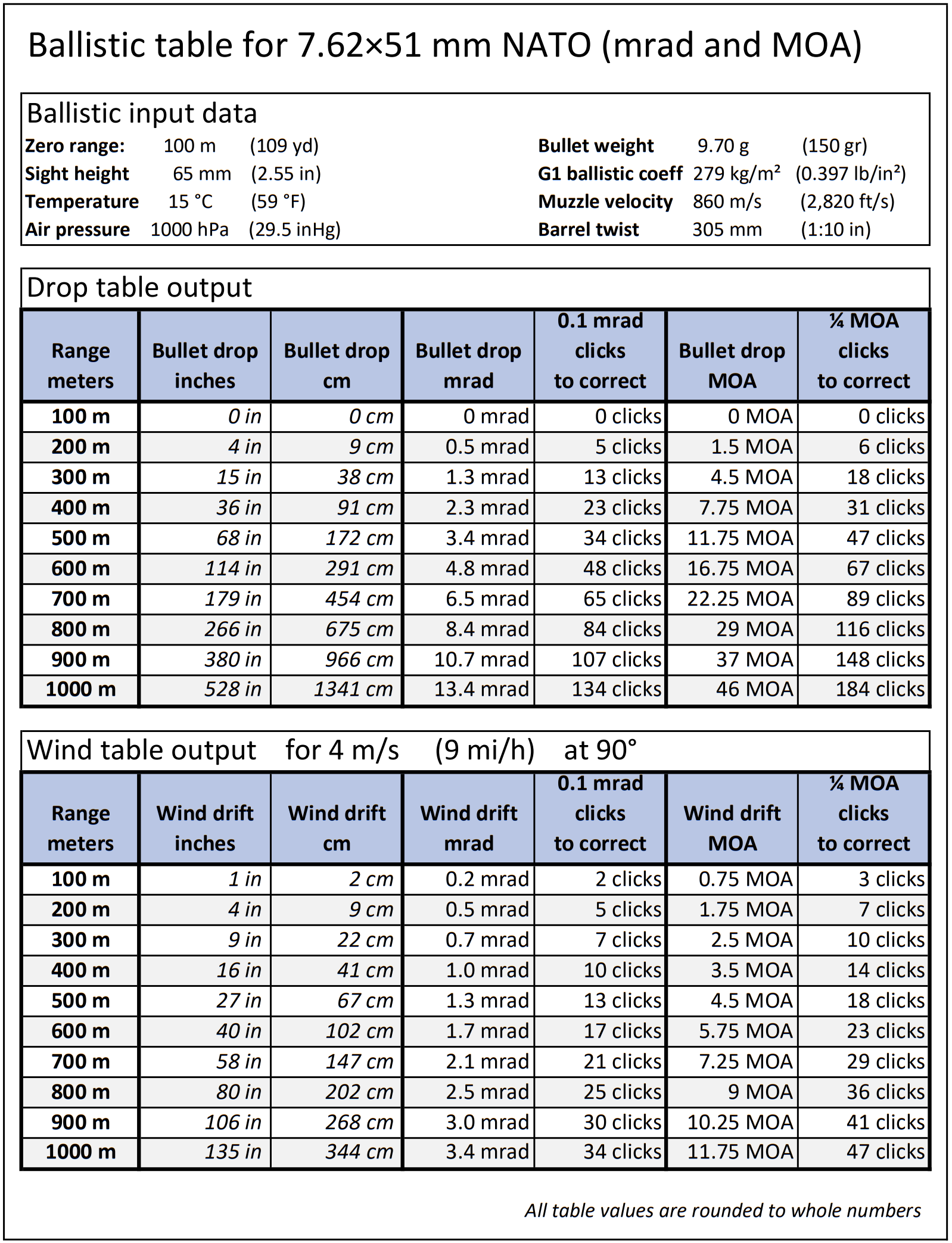
Example of a ballistic table for a given 7.62×51mm NATO load. Bullet drop and wind drift are shown both in mrad and MOA.

A ballistic table or ballistic chart, also known as the data of previous engagements (DOPE) chart, is a reference data chart used in long-range shooting to predict the trajectory of a projectile and compensate for physical effects of gravity and wind drift, in order to increase the probability of the projectile successfully reaching the intended target. Ballistic tables commonly are used in target shooting, hunting, military sharpshooting and ballistic science applications.

Ballistic chart data are typically given in angular measurements with units in either milliradians (mil/mrad) or minutes of arc (MOA), arranged in a table format with the rows representing different reference distances and the columns corresponding to categories of information (e.g. angular deviations, actual drop/drift distance, "click" count, etc.) in which the shooter is interested. After ranging the intended target, the shooter can then read off the chart data to estimate the ballistic correction required (relative to a zeroed range) and calibrate the aim accordingly by turning the adjustment knobs on the scope and/or using the reference markings on the scope's reticle.

Ballistic tables are usually generated using specifically designed computer programs built on mathematical functions known as ballistic softwares, and an electronic device that runs ballistic softwares is called a ballistic calculator or ballistic computer. The number of inputs to the ballistic calculator can sometimes vary depended on the specific generator, or the user may choose to only input certain variables. For example, a very simple drop table can be made using inputs for the sight adjustment value (in mil or MOA), the zero range, intended target ranges, muzzle velocity, caliber, ballistic coefficient and bullet weight. Some of the environmental effects that play a role in calculating the trajectory are gravity, projectile spin, wind, temperature, air pressure and humidity. More advanced tables can take more factors into account to ensure a more accurate prediction of the trajectory, which becomes increasingly affected by gravity and wind drift over longer distances due to the more prolonged bullet flight. Some of these variables may have a negligible effect on shorter ranges.

== See also ==
- External ballistics
