= Thermal weapon sight =

Sighting device used on weapons

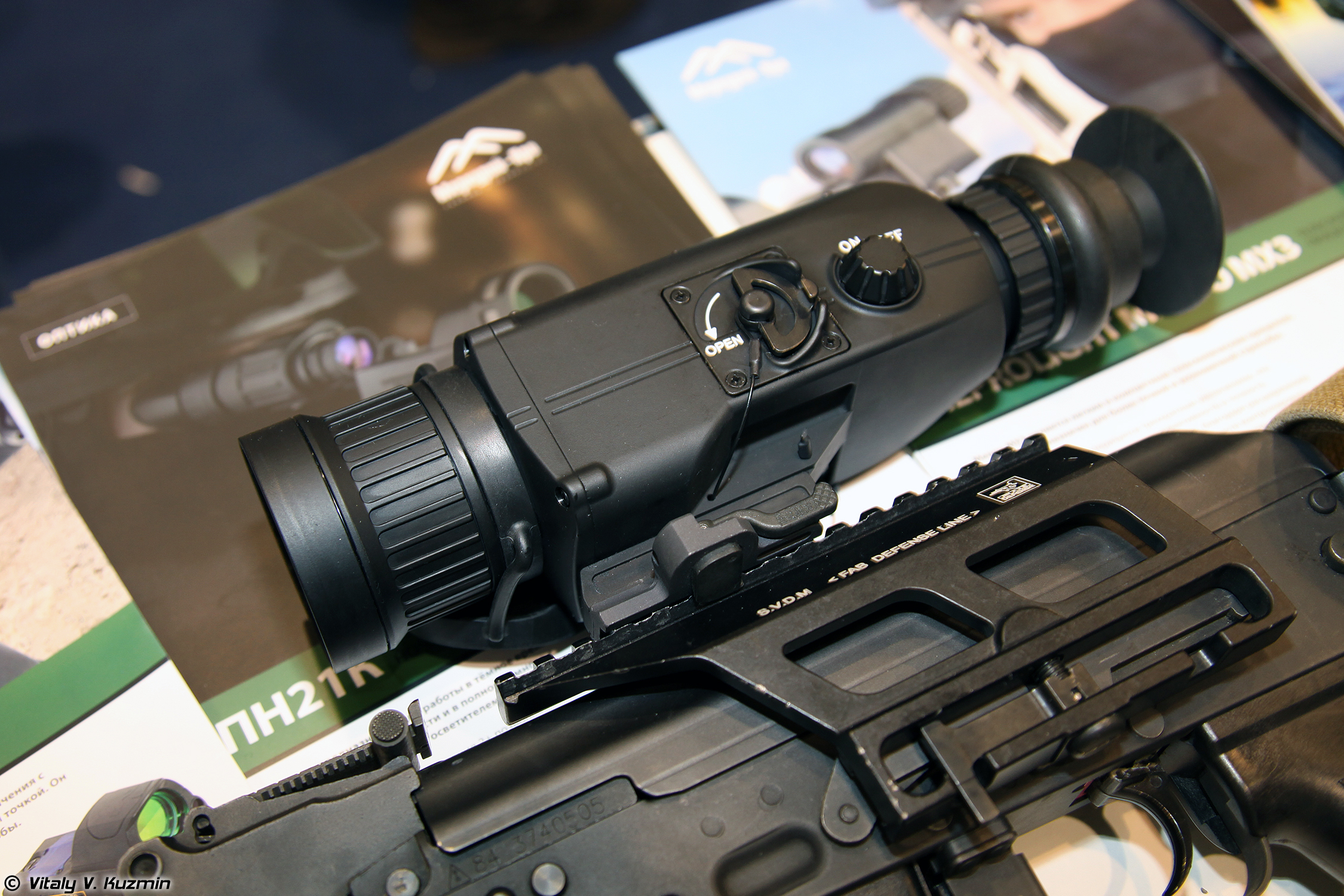
A Meprolight NYX thermal weapon sight

A thermographic weapon sight, thermal imagery scope or thermal weapon sight is a sighting device combining a compact thermographic camera and an aiming reticle. They can be mounted on a variety of small arms as well as some heavier weapons.

As with regular ultraviolet sensors, thermal weapon sights can operate in total darkness. Unlike optical scopes, thermal sights don't rely on visible light, allowing them to function in complete darkness.The thermal scope can be quite useful in places with snow as the extreme difference in temperatures between the snow and any source of heat (such as a human) creates a high visual contrast between the two. This makes it easy to locate any source of heat against its low-temperature background.

== Generations ==
Thermal weapon sights are often used by hunters to aid in the detection of game, such as feral hogs, coyotes, or rodents such as rats. The sight's ability to see unaided even in complete darkness allows the hunter to be undetected and aware of potential prey, facilitating a quick and precise takedown. The new generation of thermal weapon have sharing features and are compatible with video-sharing websites including YouTube. The whole shooting adventure is recorded by the thermal imaging device and forwarded by a mobile phone application. The file is transferred by a Wi-Fi connection and the video clips can be uploaded directly into a video-sharing website. Videos can also be stored in the SD card and can subsequently be viewed on a personal computer or television. The new generation thermal weapon by companies including FLIR and Pulsar, where as the previous generation were primarily used by the military and hunters.

== See also ==
- Night vision
- Thermography
- Thermographic camera
