= German Army =

Land warfare branch of Germany

- Heer
- Logo of the German Army
- Founded: 12 November 1955; 70 years ago
- Country: Germany
- Type: Army
- Role: Land warfare
- Size: 63,047 men (2024)
- Part of: Bundeswehr
- Army Command: Strausberg, Brandenburg
- Mottos: Schützen, helfen, vermitteln, kämpfen; ('Protect, help, moderate, fight')
- Anniversaries: 12 November
- Equipment: List of equipment
- Engagements: United Nations Operations in Somalia; IFOR in Bosnia and Herzegovina 1995–96; Operation Libelle; Kosovo War; Battle of Tetovo; 1999 East Timorese crisis; Operation Essential Harvest; War in Afghanistan; North Kosovo Crisis
- Decorations: Awards and decorations
- Website: deutschesheer.de

Commanders
- Current commander
- Federal Chancellor: Friedrich Merz
- Minister of Defence: Boris Pistorius
- Inspector General: General Carsten Breuer
- Inspector of the Army: Lieutenant General Christian Freuding

Insignia
- Flag

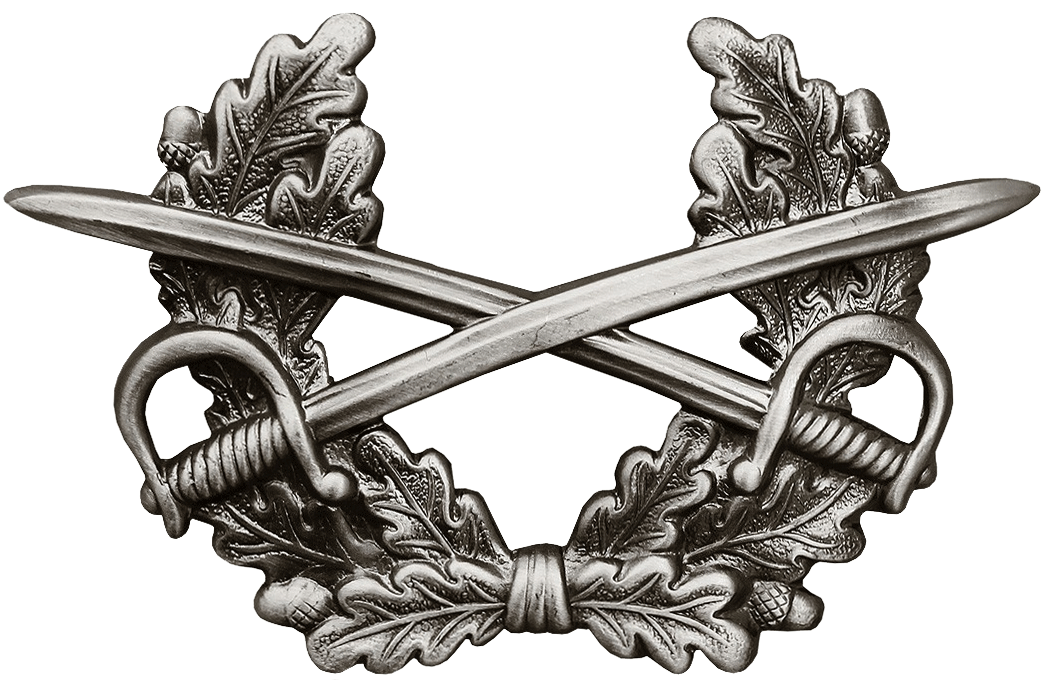
- Insignia

Aircraft flown
- Attack helicopter: Eurocopter Tiger
- Trainer helicopter: Eurocopter EC135
- Utility helicopter: NH90

The German Army (German: Heer, lit. 'army') is the land component of the armed forces of Germany. The present-day German Army was founded in 1955 as part of the newly formed West German Bundeswehr together with the Marine (German Navy) and the Luftwaffe (German Air Force). As of 2024, the German Army had a strength of 63,047 soldiers.

== History ==
=== Overview ===
A German army equipped, organized, and trained following a single doctrine and permanently unified under one command was created in 1871 during the unification of Germany under the leadership of Prussia. From 1871 to 1919, the title Deutsches Heer (German Army) was the official name of the German land forces. Following the German defeat in World War I and the end of the German Empire, the main army was dissolved. From 1921 to 1935 the name of the German land forces was the Reichsheer (Army of the Realm) and from 1935 to 1945 the name Heer was used. The Heer was one of two ground forces of the Third Reich during World War II but, unlike the Heer, the Waffen-SS was not a branch of the Wehrmacht but was a combat force under the Nazi Party's own Schutzstaffel (SS). The Heer was formally disbanded in August 1946.

After World War II, Germany was divided into the Federal Republic of Germany (West Germany) and the German Democratic Republic (East Germany), which both formed their own armed forces: on 12 November 1955 the first recruits began their service in the West German Heer, while on 1 March 1956 the East German Landstreitkräfte der NVA (Land Forces of the National People's Army) were founded. During the Cold War, the West German Army was fully integrated into NATO's command structure while the Landstreitkräfte were part of the Warsaw Pact. Following the process of German reunification in 1990, the Landstreitkräfte were partially integrated into the German Army. Since then, the German Army has been employed in peacekeeping operations worldwide and since 2002 also in combat operations in Afghanistan as part of NATO's International Security Assistance Force.

=== Founding of the Army ===
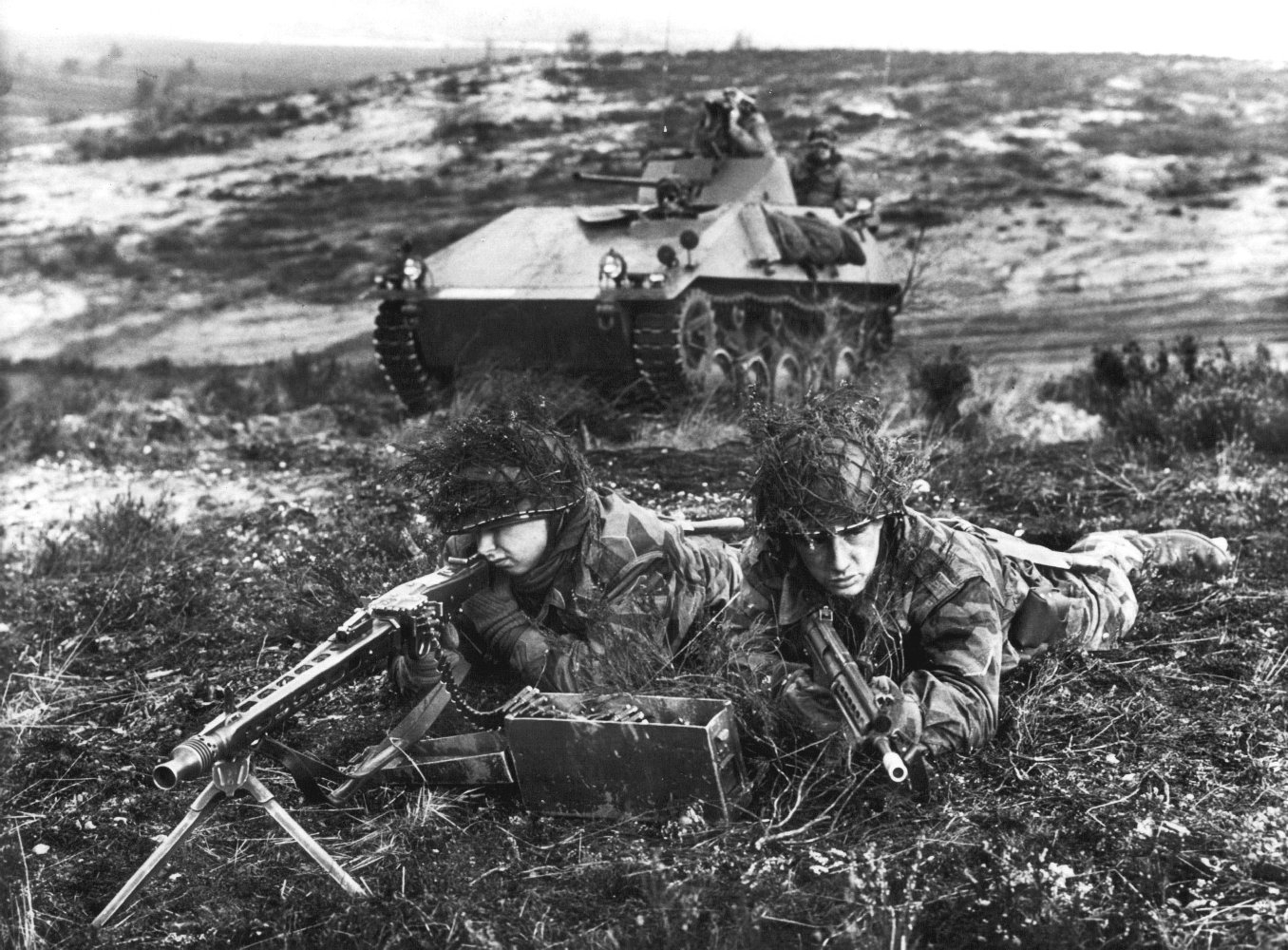
Bundeswehr soldiers with MG1 and HK G3 during a 1960s maneuver. In the background is a Schützenpanzer Kurz.

Following World War II the Allies dissolved the Wehrmacht with all its branches on 20 August 1946. However already one year after the founding of the Federal Republic of Germany in May 1949 and because of its increasing links with the West under German chancellor Konrad Adenauer, the Consultative Assembly of Europe began to consider the formation of a European Defence Community with German participation on 11 August 1950. Former high-ranking Wehrmacht officers outlined in the Himmeroder memorandum a plan for a "German contingent in an international force for the defense of Western Europe." For the German land forces the memorandum envisioned the formation of a 250,000 strong army. The officers saw the need for the formation of twelve Panzer divisions and six corps staffs with accompanying Corps troops, as only armoured divisions could muster a fighting force to throw back the numerically far superior forces of the Warsaw Pact.

Theodor Blank was appointed "officer of the Federal Chancellor for the Strengthening of Allied Troops questions". This Defence Ministry forerunner was known somewhat euphemistically as the Blank Office (Amt Blank), but explicitly used to prepare for the rearmament of West Germany (Wiederbewaffnung). By March 1954 the Blank Office had finished plans for a new German army. Plans foresaw the formation of six infantry, four armoured, and two mechanised infantry divisions, as the German contribution to the defense of Western Europe in the framework of a European Defence Community. On 8 February 1952 the Bundestag approved a German contribution to the defense of Western Europe and on 26 February 1954 the Basic Law of the Republic was amended with the insertion of an article regarding the defence of the sovereignty of the federal government. Following a decision at the London Nine Power Conference of 28 September to 3 October 1954, Germany's entry into NATO effective from 9 May 1955 was accepted as a replacement for the failed European Defence Community plan. Afterwards the Blank Office was converted to the Defence Ministry and Theodor Blank became the first Defence Minister. The nucleus of army was the so-called V Branch of the Department of Defence. Subdivisions included were VA Leadership and Training, VB Organisation and VC Logistics.

The army saw itself explicitly not as a successor to the defeated Wehrmacht, but as in the traditions of the Prussian military reformers of 1807 to 1814 and the members of the military resistance during National Socialism, such as the officers which undertook the failed 20 July plot to assassinate Adolf Hitler in 1944. Nevertheless, for lack of alternatives the officer corps was made up largely of former Wehrmacht officers. The first Chief of the Army was the former Wehrmacht General der Panzertruppe Hans Rottiger, who had been involved in the drafting of the Himmeroder memorandum.

The official date of the founding of the army is 12 November 1955 when the first soldiers began their service in Andernach. In 1956 the first troops set up seven training companies in Andernach and began the formation of schools and training centers. On 1 April 1957, the first conscripts arrived for service in the army. The first military organisations created were instructional battalions, officer schools, and the Army Academy, the forerunner to the Führungsakademie der Bundeswehr in Hamburg. In total of twelve armoured and infantry divisions were to be established by 1959, as planned in Army Structure I. To achieve this goal existing units were split approximately every six months. However the creation of all twelve divisions did not take place until 1965. At the end of 1958 the strength of the army was about 20,200 men. The army was equipped at first with American material, such as the M-47 Patton main battle tank. Three corps commands were formed beginning in 1957: the I Corps, II Corps, and the III Corps.

Also in 1957 the "Office for Territorial Defence" was established as the highest Territorial Army authority. The Office for Territorial Defence was under the direct command of the Federal Ministry of Defence and commanded the Territorial Army (Germany) (Territorialheer), a reserve formation. While the Heer along with the Marine and Luftwaffe were firmly integrated into the NATO Military Command Structure, the Territorialheer remained under national command. The main function of the Territorialheer was to maintain the operational freedom of NATO forces through providing rear area defence against saboteurs, enemy special forces, and the like. There were three Territorial Commands (Territorialkommandos), including North, South, and Schleswig-Holstein, and up to six Wehrbereichskommandos (WBKs), military regional commands. By 1985 each of the WBKs had two Heimatschutzbrigades (HSBs, home defence brigades).

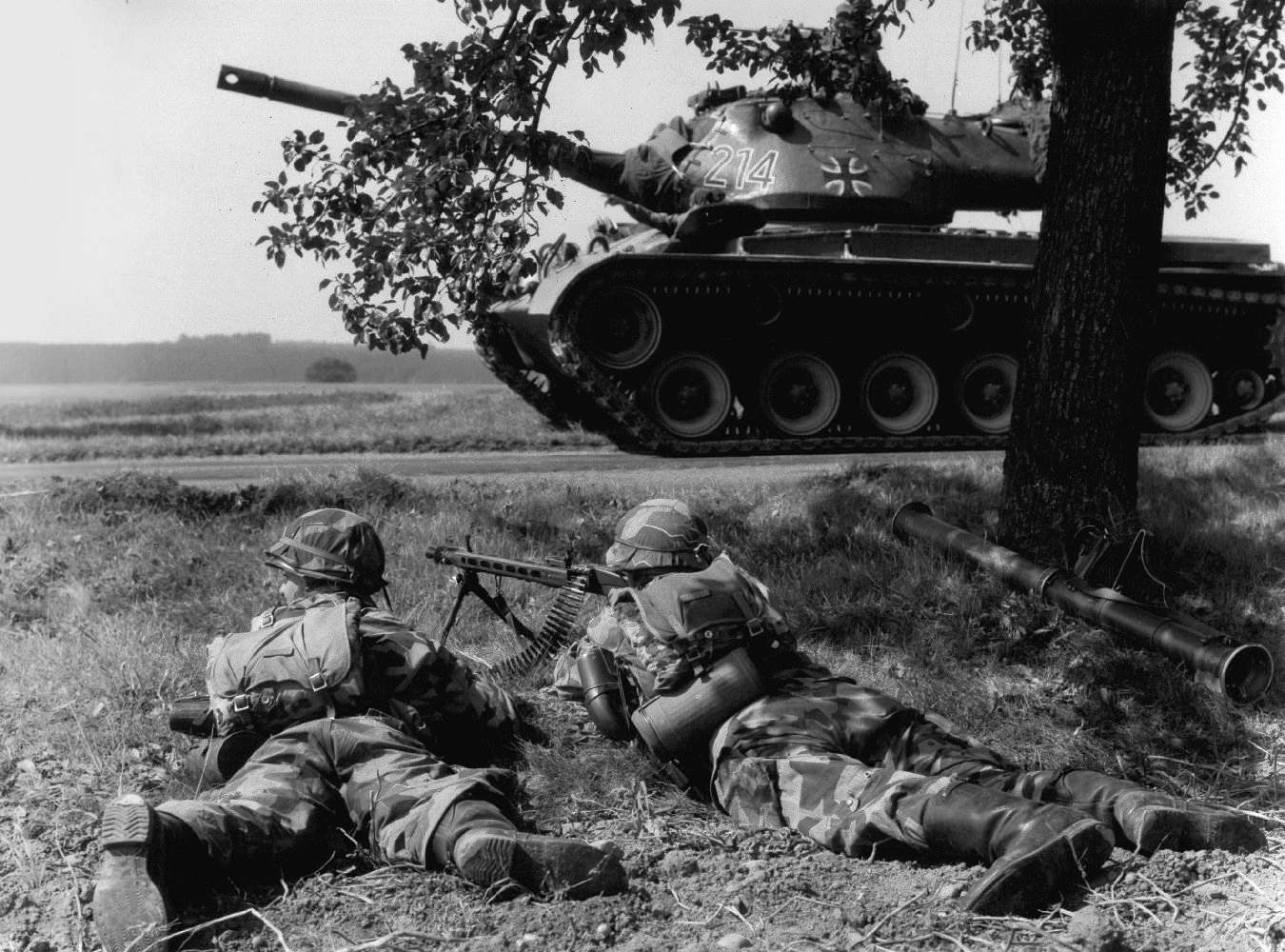
M47 Patton tank in service with the Bundeswehr, 1960

The development of Soviet tactical nuclear weapons required the development of a new Army structure even before Army Structure 1 was fully achieved. To minimize the effects of attacks with tactical nuclear weapons on massed forces, the 28,000-strong divisions of the Heer were broken up into smaller and more mobile brigades under Army Structure 2. These smaller units were also to be capable of self-sustainment on a nuclear battlefield for several days, and to be capable of moving quickly from defense and to attack. The new armoured and mechanised brigades were capable of combined arms combat. Each division was composed of three brigades. The armoured brigades consisted of an armoured infantry battalion, two armoured battalions, a self-propelled artillery battalion and a supply battalion. The mechanised brigades consisted of a motorised infantry battalion, two mechanised infantry battalions, an armoured battalion, a field artillery battalion and a supply battalion. The motorised brigades consisted of three motorised infantry battalions, an anti-tank battalion, a field artillery battalion and a supply battalion. The alpine brigades consisted of three alpine battalions, a mountain artillery battalion and a supply battalion. By 1959 the Heer consisted of 11 divisions of 27 brigades, four Panzer (armoured), four Panzergrenadier (mechanised), two Jäger (motorised), and one Gebirgsjäger (alpine).

From roughly 1970 onward, Army Structure 3 saw the targeted number of 36 active brigades raised by 1975 while the 2nd and 4th Panzergrenadier divisions were reorganised into Jäger formations. The armies Fallschirmjäger (paratrooper) brigades were renamed into Luftlande (airborne) brigades and a third brigade (Luftlandebrigade 27) was formed.

Under Army Structure 4 from 1980/81 on, the German Army fielded 12 divisions (with 38 active brigades): six Panzer (armoured), four Panzergrenadier (mechanised), one Luftlande (airborne), and one Gebirgs (alpine) divisions. Ten active divisions were grouped into three corps: I German Corps as part of NATO's Northern Army Group, II German Corps and III German Corps as part of Central Army Group. The remaining heavy division (6th Panzergrenadier Division) was part of Allied Forces Baltic Approaches. In peacetime the 1st Airborne Division was assigned to II German Corps with its three brigades to be distributed among the three Corps respectively in wartime, forming a quick reaction reserve.

The number of active brigades rose compared to Army Structure 3 due to two Heimatschutz territorial defense brigades (51 and 56) being assigned to the field army as part of a mechanised and mountain division, respectively. The non-NATO assigned territorial army formed 10 further territorial defense brigades for rear area security at varying readiness levels, with most units being partially manned in peacetime and others being entirely non-active units with equipment in storage.

Brigades in the field army grew to four combat battalions instead of three. Mechanised brigades typically consisted of one Panzer and three Panzergrenadier battalions, of which one was a partially active and mixed formation, containing a tank company and two mechanised companies. Armoured brigades similarly consisted of one Panzergrenadier and three Panzer battalions, with one armoured battalion being mixed and partially active (containing one mechanised and two tank companies).

Mechanised infantry battalions in mechanised brigades typically had one of three companies equipped as motorised infantry with M113 APCs instead of Marder IFVs.

=== Post-Cold War ===
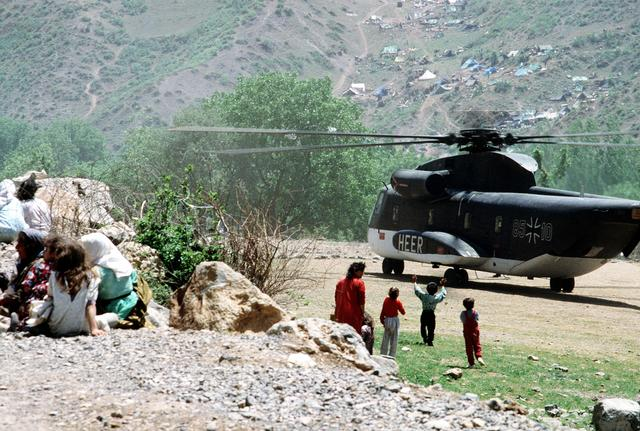
Helicopter of the German Army Aviation Corps in northern Iraq in 1991

After 1990, the Heer absorbed the Nationale Volksarmee, the armed forces of East Germany. The former East German forces were initially controlled by the Bundeswehr Command East under the command of Lieutenant General Jörg Schönbohm and disbanded on 30 June 1991. In the aftermath of the merger, the German Army consisted of four Corps (including IV Corps at Potsdam in the former DDR) with a manpower of 360,000 men. It was continuously downsized from this point. In 1994 III Corps was reorganised as the German Army Forces Command. In 1996, the 25th Airborne Brigade was converted into a new command leading the Army's special forces, known as the Kommando Spezialkräfte.

Logistics, CBRN defense, territorial defense and military police units were split off into the newly formed Joint Support Service and medical units into the Joint Medical Service in 2000. The transferred units continue to wear army uniforms.

The 2001 onwards restructuring of the German Army saw it move to a seven division structure – five mechanised (each with two mechanised brigades), one special forces, and one air assault.

In 2003, three Corps still existed, each including various combat formations and a maintenance brigade, as well as the I. German/Dutch Corps, a joint German-Netherlands organization, used to control in peacetime the 1st Panzer and 7th Panzer Divisions as well as Dutch formations. The 1st Panzer would have reported to the corps in wartime while the 7th would be posted to the Allied Rapid Reaction Corps. II Corps was German in peacetime but would have exchanged a division with the V U.S. Corps in time of war (the 5th Panzer). The 5th Panzer Division was formally disbanded as of 30 June 2001. In peacetime it also commanded the 10th Panzer Division, which was allocated to Eurocorps and which parents the German half of the Franco-German Brigade. The 1st Mountain Division at Munich was also subordinate to this headquarters.

The IV Corps was headquartered at Potsdam in eastern Germany and controlled two Panzergrenadier Divisions, the 13th and 14th. The 14th Panzergrenadier Division also took control of units in Western Germany re-subordinated from the 6th Panzergrenadier Division when it lost its command function. It would have made up the German contribution to the Multinational Corps Northeast in time of war. IV Corps also used to have under its command the Military District Command I, the 1st Airmobile Brigade, and the Berlin Command (de:Standortkommando Berlin).

The current structure was assumed with the most recent German Army reform which also suspended conscription by 1 July 2011 and saw the army move to a purely professional three division structure with a view on creating smaller, more flexible and more deployable units, emphasising global employment against non-state threats such as international terrorism or as part of UN and EU missions.

As of January 2022, the German Army had a strength of 62,766 soldiers.

== Structure and organisation ==
German Army locations 2025
Panzer Panzergrenadier Fallschirmjäger Infantry Gebirgsjäger Special Forces
(13 Light Brigade in Oirschot (Netherlands) and Panzer Brigade 45 in Rūdninkai (Lithuania) are offscreen)

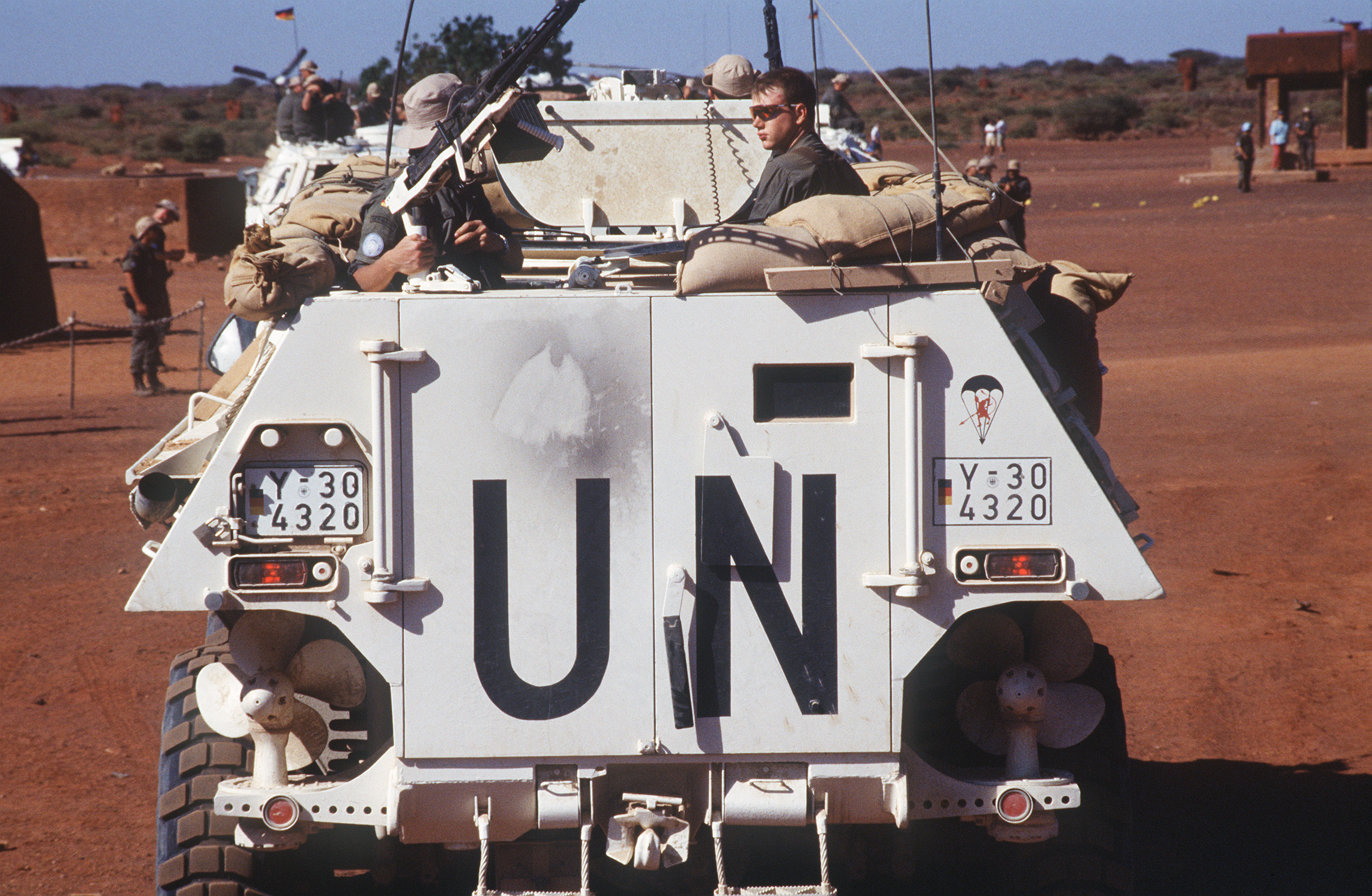
German Army soldiers from Paratrooper Battalion 261 on board an armoured personnel carrier in Somalia in 1993

German ISAF soldiers involved in combat in northern Afghanistan in 2009

The German Army is commanded by the Inspector of the Army (Inspekteur des Heeres) based at the Army Command (Kommando Heer) in Strausberg near Berlin. The training centers are supervised by the Army Training Command in Leipzig.

The combat units of the army now include two armoured divisions and the lighter rapid forces division. Unlike other European armies such as neighbouring France, regiments are not a common form of organization and are thus rare in the German army. Battalions and regiments are directly subordinate to brigades or to divisions as divisional troops. German infantry battalions field 1,000 men, considerably larger than most NATO armies. While some brigades are still designated as either Panzer (armour) or Panzergrenadier (mechanised infantry) formations, these names are by now traditional and no longer imply a different organisation, for example an armoured brigade would not be expected to contain more tanks than a mechanised one.

- 1. Panzerdivision in Oldenburg
  - Panzerlehr Brigade 9, in Munster
  - Panzer Brigade 21, in Augustdorf
  - Panzergrenadier Brigade 41, in Neubrandenburg
  - 43 Mechanized Brigade (Royal Netherlands Army), in Havelte (Netherlands)
  - Divisional troops
- 10. Panzerdivision, in Veitshöchheim
  - Panzer Brigade 12, in Cham
  - 13 Light Brigade (Royal Netherlands Army), in Oirschot (Netherlands)
  - Panzergrenadier Brigade 37, in Frankenberg
  - Panzerbrigade 45, in Rūdninkai (Lithuania)
  - Franco-German Brigade, in Müllheim
  - Divisional troops
- Rapid Forces Division, in Stadtallendorf
  - Airborne Brigade 1, in Saarlouis
  - 11 Airmobile Brigade (Royal Netherlands Army), in Schaarsbergen (Netherlands)
  - Gebirgsjäger Brigade 23, in Bad Reichenhall
  - Special Operations Forces (KSK), in Calw
  - Helicopter Command, in Bückeburg
  - Divisional troops
- Home Defence Division, in Berlin
  - Home Defence Regiment 1, in Roth
  - Home Defence Regiment 2, in Münster
  - Home Defence Regiment 3, in Nienburg
  - Home Defence Regiment 4, in Alt Duvenstedt
  - Home Defence Regiment 5, in Ohrdruf
  - Home Defence Regiment 6, in Altengrabow (forming, official activation October 2025)
- Eurocorps (German elements), in Strasbourg (France)
  - Command Support Brigade
    - German elements in two permanent battalions and one staff company
- 1 (German/Dutch) Corps, in Münster
  - German elements in two permanent battalions and one staff company
- Multinational Corps Northeast, in Szczecin (Poland)
  - 610th Signal Battalion, in Prenzlau
- Central Army Depot, in Herongen
- Central Army Depot, in Pirmasens
- Central Mobilisation Base, in Brück

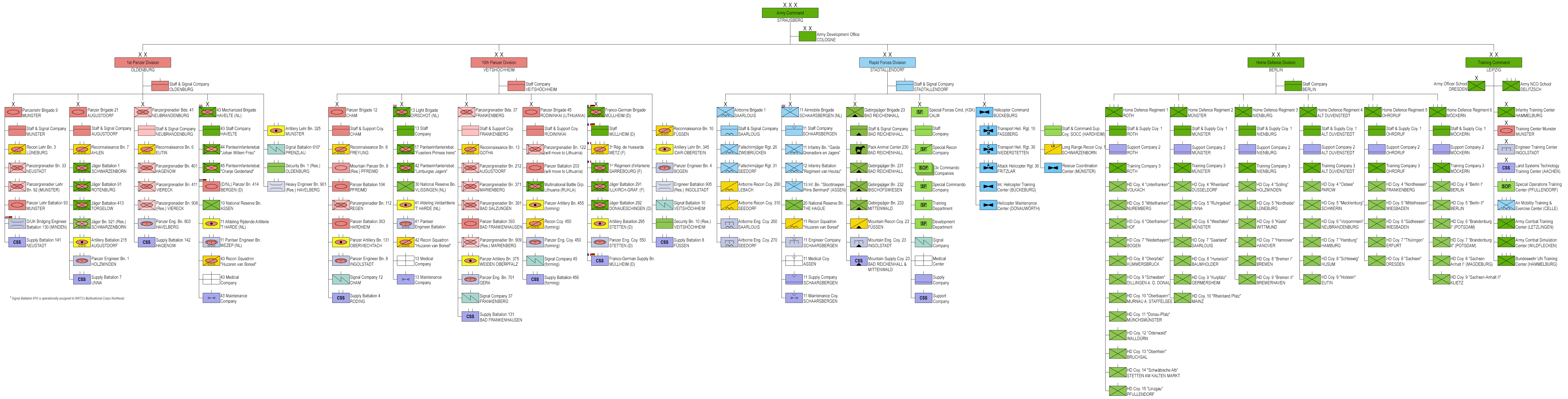
Organization of the German Army with integrated Royal Netherlands Army units in 2025 (for the organization with only German units see: Structure of the German Army)

== Equipment ==
=== Planned investments ===
As of August 2025, Germany plans to invest €350 billion in new equipment through 2041. These investments come on top of the special fund of €100 billion. This includes the following estimated budgets:

- German Army:
  - Communications equipment: €15.9 billion
  - Vehicles and accessories: €20.8 billion
  - Combat vehicles: €52.5 billion
  - Munitions: €70.3 billion
  - Field and logistics material: €20.9 billion

== Truppengattungen ==
The German Army is divided into several branches, each known as a Truppengattung, which might also be part of a Truppengattungsverbund which includes several Truppengattungen. Each Waffengattung carries a certain beret color (except for the mountain troops, who carry a distinctive cap) and uniform markings in a certain Waffenfarbe, although the combinations might overlap.

Current Waffengattungen of the Bundeswehr
Truppengattungsverbund	Truppengattung	Beret color	Waffenfarbe
Infantry	Jägertruppe (motorized infantry)	Green	Green
Infantry	Gebirgsjägertruppe (mountain warfare)	Bergmütze	Green
Infantry	Fallschirmjägertruppe (airborne infantry)	Bordeaux	Green
Armoured Forces	Panzergrenadiertruppe (mechanized infantry)	Green	Green
Armoured Forces	Panzertruppe (tanks)	Black	Pink
Special forces	Kommando Spezialkräfte	Bordeaux	Green
Artillery	Artillerietruppe	Light Red	High Red
Army aviation	Heeresfliegertruppe	Bordeaux	Gray
Military engineers	Pioniertruppe	Light Red	Black
Signals troops	Fernmeldetruppe	Light Red	Yellow
Army reconnaissance	Aufklärungstruppe	Black	Gold
Army logistics	Instandsetzungstruppe (maintenance)	Light Red	Middle blue
Army logistics	Nachschubtruppe (materiel and transportation)	Light Red	Middle blue
Army medical service	Sanitätsdienst Heer	Dark Blue	Dark blue

As part of various reorganizations (such as the creation of the Joint Support Service and the Cyber and Information Domain Service) and the reductions in size of the Bundeswehr after 1990, several Truppengattungen were dissolved.

Former Waffengattungen of the Bundeswehr
Truppengattung	Beret color	Waffenfarbe	Fate
ABC-Abwehrtruppe (CBRN defense)	Light Red	Bordeaux	Passed from the army to the Joint Support Service.
Feldjägertruppe (military police)	Light Red	Orange	Passed from the army to the Joint Support Service.
Feldnachrichtentruppe (HUMINT)	Black	Gold	Dissolved; folded into the Aufklärungstruppe.
Fernmeldetruppe EloKa (electronic warfare)	Dark Blue	Yellow	Passed from the army to the Cyber and Information Domain Service.
Fernspähtruppe (special reconnaissance)	Black	Gold	Dissolved; folded into the Aufklärungstruppe.
Heeresflugabwehrtruppe (army air defence)	Light Red	Coral Red	Dissolved; anti-air defense largely left to the responsibilities of the German Air Force.
Militärmusikdienst (military bands)	Various	White	Passed from the army to the Joint Support Service.
Operative Kommunikation (PsyOps)	Dark Blue	Yellow	Passed from the army to the Cyber and Information Domain Service.
Panzeraufklärungstruppe (armored reconnaissance)	Black	Gold	Dissolved; folded into the Aufklärungstruppe.
Panzerjäger (anti-tank)	Black	Pink	Dissolved; folded into the Panzertruppe.
Topographietruppe (military topography)	Light Red	High Red	Dissolved in 2004; restructured as the Geo Information Service.

Waffenfarbe (Army and army support branch only)

NBC

Artillery

Armored forces

Feldjäger

Reconnaissance

Signals

Infantry

Logistics

Medical troops

Military band

Heeresflieger

Army engineers
- Bright Red: General ranks (only Kragenspiegel, not Litze),
- Crimson: General Staff

== Rank structure ==
The rank structure of the German army is adjusted to the rank structure of NATO. Unlike its predecessors, the modern German Army does not use the rank of Colonel General. The highest rank for an army officer is Lieutenant General, as the rank of Full General is reserved for the Armed Forces chief of staff or officers serving as NATO officers.

Officers

NATO code	OF-10	OF-9	OF-8	OF-7	OF-6	OF-5	OF-4	OF-3	OF-2		OF-1
German Army
German Army		General	Generalleutnant	Generalmajor	Brigadegeneral	Oberst	Oberstleutnant	Major	Stabshauptmann	Hauptmann	Oberleutnant	Leutnant

NCOs and enlisted

NATO code	OR-9	OR-8	OR-7	OR-6		OR-5		OR-4				OR-3		OR-2	OR-1
German Army
German Army	Oberstabsfeldwebel	Stabsfeldwebel	Hauptfeldwebel	Oberfeldwebel	Feldwebel	Stabsunteroffizier	Unteroffizier	Stabskorporal	Korporal	Oberstabsgefreiter	Stabsgefreiter	Hauptgefreiter	Obergefreiter	Gefreiter	Soldat
German Army (Officer designate)
German Army (Officer designate)			Oberfähnrich	Fähnrich		Fahnenjunker

== See also ==
- Bavarian Army
- History of Germany during World War I
- History of Germany during World War II
- Imperial German Army (1870-1919)
- Kaiserliche Armee (to 1806)
  - Imperial German Army
  - Luftstreitkräfte, the Airforce
  - Kaiserliche Marine, the Navy
- Prussian Army
- Tank battalions of the German Army 1956–2008
- List of military weapons of Germany
