= Corps colours =

Corps colour[s] (German: Waffenfarbe[n]) may refer to:

- Corps colours (Waffen-SS)
- Corps colours of the Luftwaffe (1935–1945)
- Corps colours of the Sturmabteilung
- Corps colours of the German Army (1935–1945)
- Corps colours (NPA)
- Corps colours (Austria)
