= Fernmeldetruppe (Bundeswehr) =

Military communications arm of service in the German Army

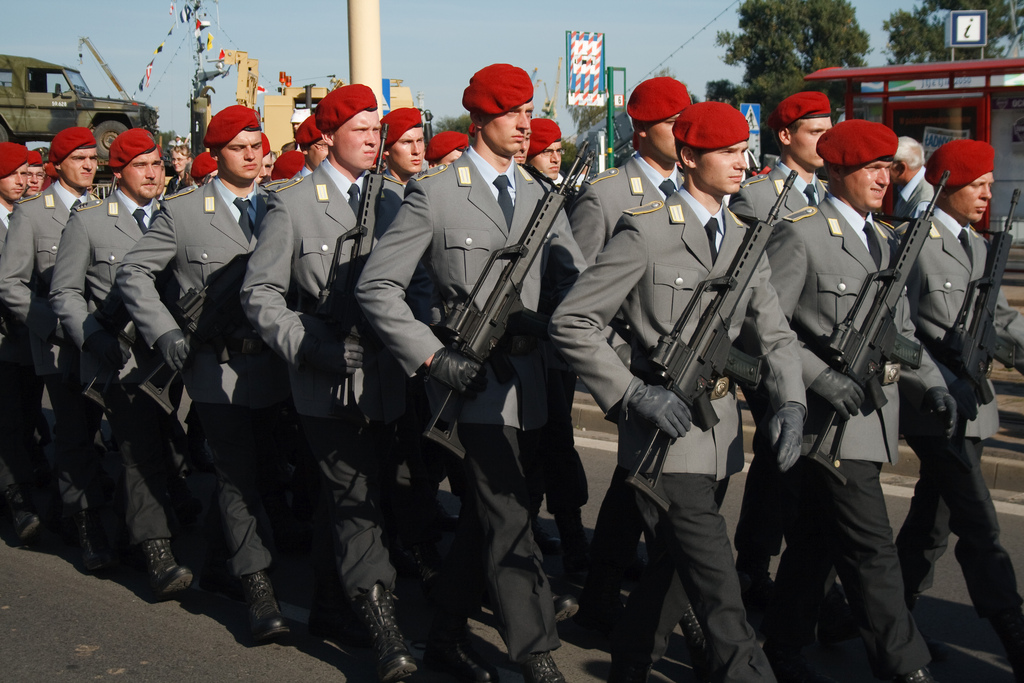
Fermmeldtruppe soldiers during ceremonies for the 10th Anniversary of Multinational Corps Northeast

The Fernmeldetruppe (roughly Telecommunications Troops or Signal Corps) is the military communications arm of service in the German Army and in the Joint Support Service of the Bundeswehr. The Fernmeldetruppe is one of the Combat Support arms. The Army Telecommunications Force is responsible for the operation of the Army's communications and information network.

== Mission ==
Telecommunications teams set up and operate telecommunications connections. The fast and secure transmission of messages, information and commands are one of the most important elements of direct communication between the command and combat troops. The telecommunications team is responsible for the operation of the German Army's communications and information network.

== Current organisation ==
Before 2015, the telecommunications troops consisted of 1 communications regiment, 8 communications battalions, and 2 communications companies, but, after the 2011 deployment concept, this was reduced to just 2 communications battalions and 2 communications companies.

=== Army communications ===
The army communications units which previously existed, and those active today, include:

- Active
  - 610th Telecommunications Battalion, based in Prenzlau (Multinational Corps Northeast, reports to 1st Panzer Division)
  - German Section of Joint German-Dutch CIS Battalion, in Eibergen (1. German/Dutch Corps)
  - Eurocorps Telecommunications Company, in Lebach (Eurocorps)
  - Special Forces Command Telecommunications Company, in Calw (Special Forces Command)
  - Franco-German Brigade Staff and Telecommunications Company, in Müllheim
- In-Active
  - 701st Telecommunications Battalion (dis-established May 2014), based in Frankenberg (37th Panzergrenadier Brigade)
  - Airborne Telecommunications Battalion, Rapid Forces Division "Hessian Lion" (dis-established April 2014), in Stadtallendorf (Rapid Forces Division)
- Disbanded
  - 1st Telecommunications Regiment (disbanded 30 June 2015), based in Rotenburg an der Wümme (1st Panzer Division)
  - 4th Telecommunications Battalion (disbanded 31 December 2014), based in Cham (12th Panzer Brigade)
  - 210th Mountain Telecommunications Battalion (disbanded 30 June 2014), based in Bad Reichenhall (23rd Gebirgsjäger Brigade)
  - 801st Telecommunications Battalion (disbanded 5 September 2015), based in Neubrandenburg (41st Panzergrenadier Brigade)
  - Telecommunications Battalion Air Movement Operations Division (disbanded 26 September 2013), in Veitshöchheim (Air Operations Division)

=== Cyber and Intelligence Troops ===
The Cyber and Intelligence Troops are technically not under the command of the Army, but rather report to the Armed Forces Command directly.

- Armed Forces Command
  - Army Information Technology System Operations Centre, in Rheinbach and Tomburg-Kaserne
  - German Commander, 1st NATO Signal Battalion, in Wesel
  - Army School of Information Technology, in Pöcking
  - Centre for Cyber Security of the Army, in Euskirchen
  - Army Software Competence Centre, in Euskirchen and Framersheim
- Strategic Reconnaissance Command
  - 281st Information Technology Battalion, in Gerolstein
  - 282nd Information Technology Battalion, in Kastellaun
  - 292nd Information Technology Battalion, in Dillingen an der Donau
  - 293rd Information Technology Battalion, in Murnau am Staffelsee
  - 381st Information Technology Battalion, in Storkow
  - 383rd Information Technology Battalion, in Erfurt
