= Territorial Army =

Territorial Army was the name of the United Kingdom's Army Reserve until 2014.

Territorial Army may also refer to:

== Combat forces ==
- Territorial Army (Ethiopia) – National ground force of Ethiopian Empire
- Territorial Army (France), part of the French Army from 1872 to 1918
- Territorial Army (Germany), part of the West German Army during the Cold War
- Territorial Army (India) – Military reserve force in India
- Territorial Army (Malaysia) – Reserve component of the Malaysian Army

=== Other names ===
- Imperial-Royal Landwehr, a component of the Austro-Hungarian Army from 1869 to 1918
- National Guard (United States) – Organized militia of the United States and a reserve component of the Armed Forces
- Royal Hungarian Honvéd, a component of the Austro-Hungarian Army from 1867 to 1918
- Territorial Force – British Army volunteer component (1908–1921), precursor to the UK's Territorial Army

== See also ==
- Landwehr – German national militias in the nineteenth and early twentieth-centuries
- Militia – Force of non-professional soldiers
- Territorial Defense (disambiguation)
