= List of Jäger units =

This is a list of Jäger units in various national armies. Jäger (or Jaeger (Note: Jäger is standard German. However, when writing German on a keyboard without Umlauts, it is usual to replace the ä by ae (and similarly ö by oe and ü by ue).)) is the German word for "hunter", and describes a kind of light infantry. The German word Jäger may also be translated as "rifleman" or "ranger" into English.

== German-speaking nations' armies ==
=== Austria ===
- Jagdkommando
- Kaiserjäger

=== Germany feudal/imperial era ===
==== Prussian / imperial ====
- Royal Prussian Guard Jägerbattalion
- Royal Prussian Guard Schützenbattalion
- Royal Prussian Jägerbattalion Count York von Wartenburg (East Prussian) No.1
- Royal Prussian Jägerbattalion Prince Bismarck (Pomeranian) No.2
- Royal Prussian Brandenburg Jägerbattalion No.3
- Royal Prussian Magdeburg Jägerbattalion No.4
- Royal Prussian Jägerbattalion von Neumann (1st Silesian) No.5
- Royal Prussian 2nd Silesian Jägerbattalion No.6
- Royal Prussian Westphalian Jägerbattalion No.7
- Royal Prussian Rhineland (or Rhenish) Jägerbattalion No.8
- Royal Prussian Lauenburg Jägerbattalion No.9
- Royal Prussian Hanoverian Jägerbattalion No.10
- Royal Prussian Electoral Hessian Jägerbattalion No.11

==== Other German kingdoms and principalities ====
===== Kingdom of Bavaria =====
- Royal Bavarian 1st Jägerbattalion
- Royal Bavarian 2nd Jägerbattalion

===== Kingdom of Saxony =====
- Royal Saxon Jägerbattalion No.12
- Royal Saxon Jägerbattalion No.13

===== Grand Duchy of Mecklenburg-Schwerin =====
- Grand-Ducal Mecklenburg(-Schwerin) Jägerbattalion No.14

=== Germany (First World War) ===
==== 1914 ====
- Guard Reserve Jägerbattalion
- Guard Reserve Schützenbattalion
- Reserve Jägerbattalions 1-14
- Bavarian Reserve Jägerbattalions 1-2
- Bavarian Ski Battalions 1-2

==== 1915 ====
- Reserve Jägerbattalions 15-26
- Royal Prussian 27th Jäger Battalion (Finnish Volunteers)
- Bavarian Ski Battalions 3-4
- Württemberg Ski Company (later renamed the Württemberg Mountain Company and expanded to a Battalion, then a Regiment)
- Bavarian Jägerregiment No.1 (1st and 2nd Bavarian Jäger Battalions, 2nd Bavarian Reserve Jäger Battalion)
- Jägerregiment No.2 (10th Jäger Battalion, 10th and 14th Reserve Jäger Battalions)
- Bavarian Jägerregiment No.3 (1st - 4th Bavarian Ski Battalions)
- Alpine Corps (1st, 2nd & 3rd Jäger Regiments)

==== 1916 ====
- Württemberg Mountain Battalion
- Jägerregiment No.4 (11th Jäger Battalion, 5th and 6th Reserve Jäger Battalions)
- Jägerregiment No.5 (17th, 18th and 23rd Reserve Jäger Battalions)
- Jägerregiment No.6 (5th, 6th and 14th Jäger Battalions)
- Jägerregiment No.7 (13th Jäger Battalion, 25th and 26th Reserve Jäger Battalions)
- Jägerregiment No.8 (4th, 16th and 24th Reserve Jäger Battalions)
- Jägerregiment No.9 (8th Jäger Battalion, 12th Reserve Jäger Battalion)
- Jägerregiment No.10 (12th Jäger Battalion, 13th Reserve Jäger Battalion)

==== 1917 ====
- Royal Bavarian 29th Infantry Regiment (Jager Regiment) (1st Bavarian Reserve Jagerbattalion, 7th and 9th Reserve Jägerbattalions)
- German Jäger Division (11th, 12th & 13th Jägerregiments)

==== 1918 ====
- Württemberg Mountain Regiment
- Jägerregiment No.11 (Guard Reserve Jägerbattalion, Guard Reserve Schützenbattalion, 1st Jägerbattalion)
- Jägerregiment No.12 (2nd and 7th Jägerbattalions, 1st Reserve Jägerbattalion)
- Jägerregiment No.13 (8th, 20th and 21st Reserve Jägerbattalions)
- Jägerregiment No.14 (15th, 19th and 22nd Reserve Jägerbattalions)
- Bavarian Reserve Jägerregiment No.15 (1st Bavarian Reserve Jagerbattalion and Caucasian Railway Protection Battalion)

=== Germany (Third Reich) ===
==== Jäger units ====
- 5th Jäger Division
- 8th Jäger Division
- 28th Jäger Division
- 42nd Jäger Division
- 97th Jäger Division
- 100th Jäger Division
- 101st Jäger Division
- 104th Jäger Division
- 114th Jäger Division
- 117th Jäger Division
- 118th Jäger Division
- Jäger-Division Alpen

==== Special-purpose units ====
- 1st Ski Division
- 24th Waffen Mountain Division of the SS Karstjäger, Waffen-SS mountain troops from the Austrian Karst
- 10th Cyclist Jäger Brigade

==== Other Jäger variants ====
- Fallschirmjäger (paratroopers)
- Feldjäger (military police)
- Gebirgsjäger (mountain infantry)
- Panzerjäger (anti-tank troops)

=== Germany (Federal Republic) ===
- Jäger Regiment 1, an air-mobile infantry unit that was downsized to battalion level
- Jägerbataillon 91, a unit that was formed in 2015
- Gebirgsjägerbrigade 23, Mountain Infantry Brigade 23
  - Gebirgsjägerbataillion 231
  - Gebirgsjägerbataillion 232
  - Gebirgsjägerbataillion 233
- Fallschirmjägerregiment 26, formed in 2015 from parts of Fallschirmjägerbataillon 261 and Fallschirmjägerbataillon 263
- Fallschirmjägerregiment 31, formed in 2015 from Bataillonelements of Airborne Brigade 31

== Other national army equivalents ==
=== Belgium ===
- Chasseurs Ardennais ('Arddennes Hunters'), armoured infantry battalion
- 1st Regiment Jagers te Paard Battalion, mechanized reconnaissance battalion
- 2/4th Regiment Chasseurs à Cheval, mechanized reconnaissance battalion with electronic warfare unit

=== Denmark ===
- Jaeger Corps, a special forces unit of the Danish Special Operations Command, formerly of the Royal Danish Army

=== Finland ===
- Jäger Movement, volunteers from Finland in Germany trained as jägers
- Guard Jaeger Regiment, a Finnish Army unit
- Jaeger Brigade, a unit of the Finnish Army
- Utti Jaeger Regiment, a Finnish Army training and development centre for special forces and helicopter operations
- Armoured Jägers, Mechanized Infantry units, trained in Armoured Brigade (Finland) and Karelia Brigade
- Border Jägers, jägers trained in the Finnish Border Guard
- Coastal Jaegers, marine commando unit of the Finnish Navy
- Häme Mounted Jäger Battalion, previously Häme Cavalry Regiment, dismounted in 1944, disbanded in 2014.

=== The Netherlands ===
- Garderegiment Grenadiers en Jagers, guards regiment, an amalgamation of the Garderegiment Grenadiers and the Garderegiment Jagers. Consists of one airborne infantry battalion
- Regiment Limburgse Jagers, line infantry (former 2nd Infantry Regiment). Consists of one armoured infantry battalion

=== Norway ===
- Hærens Jegerkommando, the armed forces competence center for ranger, airborne and counter terrorist duty in the Norwegian Army
- Jegerkompaniet, the Norwegian Army's northernmost unit
- Kystjegerkommandoen, (Coastal Ranger Command) marine unit trained to operate in littoral combat theatres, filling the role of a marine corps and coastal artillery in the Norwegian Navy
- Marinejegerkommandoen, a marine commando unit of the Norwegian Navy.
- Artillerijeger, a ranger unit specialising in special reconnaissance and forward observing for artillery and aircraft.
- Grensejeger, border rangers at the border between Russia and Norway

=== (Imperial) Russia ===
- His Majesty Lifeguard Jäger Regiment (Лейб-гвардии Егерский Его Величества полк)
- Yeger, ?including a Guard Grenadiers battalion

=== Sweden ===
Jägare are elite units in the Swedish Armed Forces

- 17th Air Force Ranger Company (Flygbasjägarna, FBJ),
- 31st Ranger Battalion
- 32nd Intelligence Battalion
- 193rd Ranger Battalion (AJB)
- 202nd Coastal Ranger Company (Kustjägarna), marine commandos trained to operate in littoral combat theatres, filling the role of a marine corps and coastal artillery
- 323rd Parachute Ranger Squadron
- Swedish Parachute Ranger School (FJS)

Defunct:

- Lapland Ranger Regiment (I 22) (1975–2000) Arctic Ranger Battalion

=== Ukraine ===
- 13th Jaeger Brigade (Ukraine)
- 68th Jaeger Brigade (Ukraine)
- 71st Jaeger Brigade (Ukraine)

=== United States ===
- The 24th Illinois Volunteer Infantry Regiment was also known as the "Hecker Jaeger Regiment" after Friedrich Hecker, its original commander.
- The Scout Sniper Platoon of Second Battalion, Third Marine Regiment is identified by the callsign "Jaeger".

== See also ==
- United States Army Rangers
