= Hans-Peter von Kirchbach =

German general

- Born: August 3, 1941 (age 85)
- Military career
- Allegiance: Germany
- Branch: German Army
- Service years: 1960–2000
- Rank: General
- Commands: 14th Panzergrenadier Division; Inspector General of the Bundeswehr

Hans-Peter von Kirchbach (born 3 August 1941) is a retired German general and former Chief of Staff of the Federal Armed Forces from 1999 to 2000.

Von Kirchbach was one of three chairpersons of the Protestant Scouting association Verband Christlicher Pfadfinderinnen und Pfadfinder from 1988 to 1991. From 2002 to 2013 he was president of Johanniter-Unfall-Hilfe (JUH), a Protestant humanitarian organisation; in 2013 he was elected as honorary president of JUH.

Military offices
Preceded by General Hartmut Bagger	Chief of Staff of the Federal Armed Forces; 1 April 1999–30 June 2000	Succeeded by General Harald Kujat
