= Sonderführer =

Specialist role introduced in the Wehrmacht of Nazi Germany

Sonderführer (German: [ˈzɔndɐˌfyːʁɐ]; lit. "special leader"; in full: Sonderführer mit militärischer Kommandobefugnis, "special leader with military command power"), abbreviated Sdf or Sf, was a specialist role introduced in the Wehrmacht of Nazi Germany in 1937 for the mobilization plan of the German armed forces.

== Wehrmacht ==
With the draft of Sonderführer to military service, the competence of civil experts and specialists could be exploited for military purposes. Certain assignments could be filled, from senior officers, company-grade officers, down to non-commissioned officer (NCO) ranks. A huge variation of service functions, e.g. in foreign languages, propaganda work, medical service, veterinary service and the like, was possible. Typically, the men were not trained as soldiers. They received the pay applicable to the position they were holding, but only by virtue of their temporary appointment. As a rule, Sonderführer were not allowed to execute the command and disciplinary powers vested in the rank. However, this was changed in 1942, during World War II, when they would receive commissions as reserve officers.

=== Categories of Sonderführer ===
Draftees were called up for Sonderführer to almost all branches of service (Heer, Luftwaffe and Kriegsmarine) or special forces, equivalent to assignments or appointment of military personnel in the hierarchy of the Wehrmacht.

Officer function assignments in the hierarchy of the Heer (Army)

- Sonderführer (B), equivalent to Major / Oberstleutnant (OF-3/-4),
- Sonderführer (K), equivalent to Captain / Hauptmann or Rittmeister (OF-2),
- Sonderführer (Z), equivalent to Leutnant / Oberleutnant (OF-1) or platoon leader.

NCO function assignments in the hierarchy of the Heer (Army)

- Sonderführer (O), also Dolmetscher O (en: Interpreter O), equivalent to an Oberfeldwebel (OR-7),
- Sonderführer (G), equivalent to an Unteroffizier (OR-4).

Sonderführer were mainly deployed:

- As interpreter
- In construction engineering
- In the field of public finance, and administration tasks
- To handle scientific tasks, e.g. as archaeology or curator
- In the field of agriculture science
- Railway transport, in particular field railways

In case of professional expertise as photographer or draughtsman, the corresponding draftee could be called up as a Sonderführer to a so-called Propaganda unit of the Wehrmacht.

An example of individual influence in the occupied territories is the case of Sonderführer Leo Weisgerber. His campaign to unify the Breton language has had a lasting influence in the French region of Brittany

=== Position and status ===
Sonderführer were called up to military service to use the skills and expertise of specialists on defined function positions. This status was limited as to time, and became revocable if a military trained soldier could fill this position. In this case, the Sonderführer was fit into the "regular" military training procedure etc. The former function position as Sonderführer – which contained a service "assignment" not including a service "grade" – remained without consideration.

By order in 1942 – Sonderführer on officer assignments received regular military training, in order to join the reserve officer corps. Therefore, the limitations to execute military command – and disciplinary powers were lifted.

The legal state of the Sonderführer was equivalent to those of a soldier in the meaning of the Nazi Service Act Legislation. Therefore, they held combatant status even prior to their appointment as commissioned officers in 1942. In the pension legislation of the Federal Republic of Germany Sonderführers are explicit equivalent to regular soldiers.

Russian emigrants who served as interpreters in the Wehrmacht, often were adjudged to Sonderführer status.

=== Rank insignia ===
Sonderführer of the Wehrmacht wore the standard military uniform but their collars and cap bands were blue-grey rather than army green, with unique shoulder and collar insignia. The collar patch was blue-grey with a gable-end device like that of Beamter a. K. in matte aluminium, with aluminium braid down the center. Epaulette patterns changed twice during the war. The original patterns, worn until March 1940 and again after December 1942, were narrow versions of army shoulder boards: a single doubled strip of aluminium braid for company-grade officer equivalents, and a single braided strip for field-officer equivalents; NCO equivalents were similar to junior officers' but green. Instead of rank pips, Sonderführer wore braided gold rings encircling the shoulder straps. From 1940 to 1942 an entirely different type of shoulder board was worn: this was like the army equivalent but the braid used incorporated repeating black-white-red chevrons, giving the whole a checkered look. Ordinary rank pips and specialization pins were worn with these "Second Regulation" epaulets. At the end of 1942 the narrow first-pattern epaulettes were brought back again.

In soldier's slang Sonderführers, as well as Wehrmacht officials and military chaplains, were called "narrow-gauge officers" (German: Schmalspuroffiziere), in a witty reference both to the form of their rank insignia and the limited width of their military knowledge.

Sonderführer in World War II

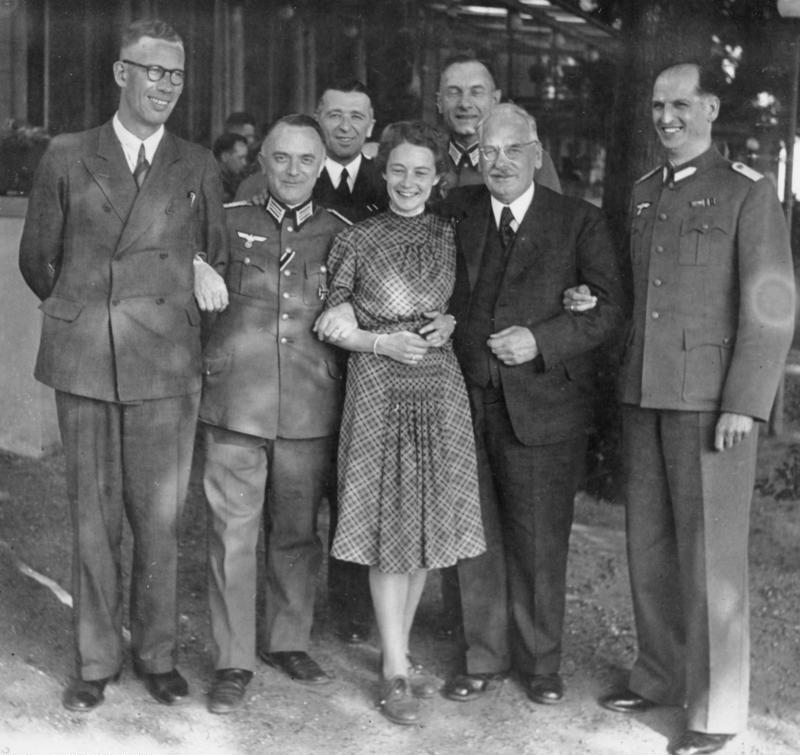
The OKW Radio service in 1939. On the far right a Sonderführer.

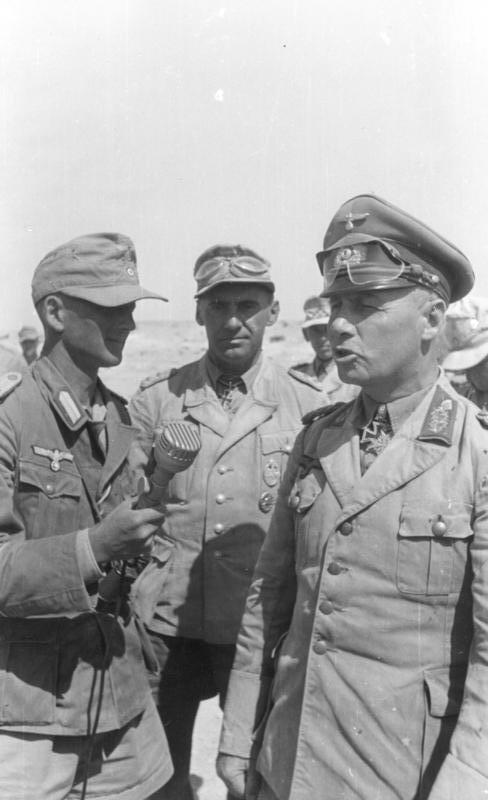
Rommel and Bayerlein, interviewed by a Sonderführer (left).

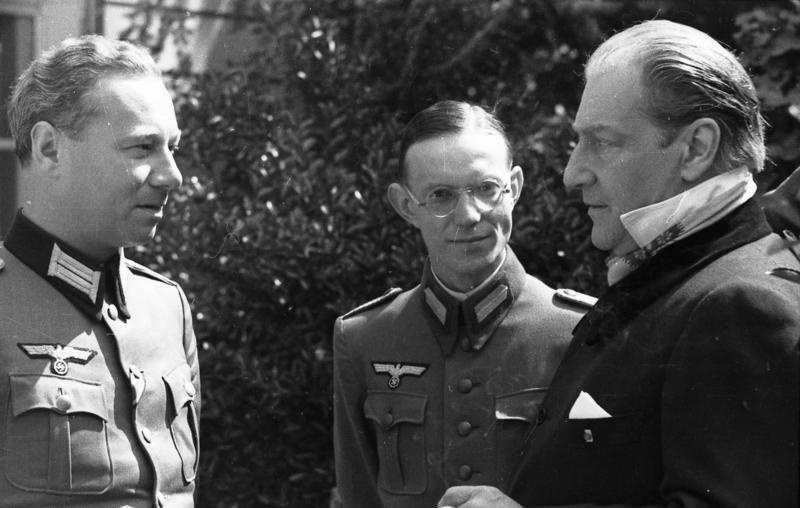
In the center a Sonderführer (O) as interpreter, France.

== SS-Sonderführer/Fachführer ==
The designation SS-Sonderführer had a different meaning in comparison to the Sonderführer in the Wehrmacht. Therefore, SS-Sonderführer should be seen in conjunction with the service rank order of the Schutzstaffel.

With the title SS-Führer im Sonderdienst (en: SS-Führer in special service), short SS-Sonderführer (en: SS-Specialist leader), from 1942 SS-Fachführer in the Waffen-SS (SS-Führer specialist in the Waffen-SS), the technical education of a SS-member was characterized.

The Allgemeine-SS introduced uniform cuff insignia (the so-called Tätigkeitsabzeichen or Sonderlaufbahnabzeichen) on the SS uniform. It characterized the professional skills of the SS specialist, e.g.: so-called special cuff career insignia (de: Sonderlaufbahnabzeichen) on the uniform in 1935

As of 1935:

- Aesculapius = Führer in the medical service
- Negative Aesculapius = medical personnel
- Gothic Z = Führer in dental medical service
- Gothic A = Apothecary
- Snake = Führer and junior Führer in the veterinarian service
- Harp = Führer conductor (de: Musikführer)

Designation	Corps colour	Example	Remarks
SS-Sonderführer (also Recruitment service (de: Ersatzwesen) and SS-Reserve officers)	Dark green		SS-Obersturmführer

Fundamental, it was possible to add any use any SS-rank in conjunction with a SS-Sonderführer assignment to any existing SS-service rank. The normal procedure was to call up SS-Sonderführer from own SS-staff.

== Other Branches ==
Sonderführer were used not only in Wehrmacht and Waffen-SS, but also in other Nazi-organisation, e.g. in the Organisation Todt, Reichsarbeitsdienst, etc.

== Notable appointments ==
Some notable personnel of this rank include:

- Lothar-Günther Buchheim, painter, photograph, writer, publisher and art collector, was deployed in a propaganda company of the Kriegsmarine as Sonderführer war correspondent. He wrote in line to personal experience the novel Das Boot.
- Hans von Dohnanyi, Sonderführer in the staff of Admiral Wilhelm Canaris, member of the resistance, executed in 1945.
- Hans Fallada, novel author, Sonderführer (B) in the so-called Reichsarbeitsdienst in France and after World War II lived in the Soviet occupation zone where he died in 1947.
- Joachim Fernau, as SS-Sonderführer of a propaganda unit assigned as war correspondence; after World War II, a very successful non-fiction book author (o. a. Deutschland, Deutschland über alles...) and painter.
- Hans Bernd Gisevius, called up to Admiral Wilhelm Canaris as Sonderführer in the staff division Ausland/Abwehr of the OKW, he took part in to the 20 July plot to kill Hitler; later was author of the book Bis zum bitteren Ende.
- Gerhard Heller, Sonderführer of the Propaganda-Staffel Paris, responsible to literary censorship and paper supply; after World War II, was a publisher.
- Robert Pilchowski, expert on tea and rubber farming, served as Sonderführer for the agency "Arbeitsgemeinschaft niederländisch-indischer Firmen" (en: working team of Dutch-Indian companies) in Amsterdam; after World War II, was an author.
- Fritz Piersig, Sonderführer (Z), as musicologist responsible to controlling of music in France since 1940.
- Eberhard Taubert, high ranking collaborator of the Reich Ministry of Public Enlightenment and Propaganda, Sonderführer of Propaganda in occupied Norway, wrote the scenario to the film The Eternal Jew; after World War II, advisor to the Minister of Defence Franz Josef Strauß.
- Wolfgang Willrich, as Sonderführer fanatic defender of the Nazi art expression.
