= Corps colours (Waffen-SS) =

Nazi military insignia (1938–1945)

Corps colours, or Troop-function colours (German: Waffenfarben) were worn in the Waffen-SS from 1938 until 1945 in order to distinguish between various branches of service, units, and functions. The corps colours were part of the pipings, gorget patches (collar patches), and shoulder boards. The colour scheme was similar to the corps colours of the German Army from 1935 to 1945. The colours appeared mainly on the piping around the shoulder boards showing a soldier's rank.

== Colours and examples ==
The table below contains the Waffen-SS corps colours, and examples for their use from 1938 to 1945.

Branch/unit/function	Colour	Example	Rank/Explanation
General officers; Personal staff of the Reichsführer-SS	Silver-grey		SS-Oberst-Gruppenführer and General of the Waffen-SS
Infantry: Motorised infantry; Panzergrenadiers	White		Flag of SS-Panzergrenadier-Regiment 40
Infantry: Motorised infantry; Panzergrenadiers	White		SS-Oberführer; SS-Standartenführer
Artillery: Sturmgeschütze (assault guns); Flak	Scarlet		Artillery flag
Artillery: Sturmgeschütze (assault guns); Flak	Scarlet		SS-Obersturmbannführer
Veterinary service	Carmine red		SS-Sturmbannführer
Legal service	Bordeaux red		
Geologists	Light pink		
Transport	Salmon-pink		
Panzers; Panzerjäger (tank destroyers)	Rose-pink		SS-Scharführer
Signals; War correspondents	Lemon yellow		SS-Untersturmführer
Cavalry; Reconnaissance (1942–45); Armoured reconnaissance	Golden yellow		SS-Obersturmführer
Feldgendarmerie (field police); Sonderdienst (special services)	Orange		SS-Unterscharführer; SS-Standartenjunker (officer candidate OR-6)
Reconnaissance (1938–42)	Copper-brown		Standartenführer; Oberführer
Concentration camps	Light brown		SS-Hauptscharführer
Sicherheitsdienst (intelligence service)	Poison green		SS-Sturmscharführer
Gebirgstruppe (mountain troops)	Meadow green		SS-Untersturmführer
Ersatzwesen (recruitment service); SS-Sonderführer; SS reserve officers	Dark green		SS-Obersturmführer
Supply	Light blue		SS-Hauptsturmführer
Administration	Bright blue		SS-Hauptsturmführer
Medical service	Cornflower blue		Standartenführer; Oberführer
Engineers corps: Assault engineers; Construction engineers	Black		SS-Oberscharführer
Main colour for collar patches	Black		SS-Unterscharführer
Main colour for uniforms	Field-grey		Identical with Heer (regular army) uniform colour

== See also ==
- Corps colours of the Luftwaffe (1935–1945)
- Corps colours of the Sturmabteilung
