= Quadriga (award) =

Annual German award sponsored by Netzwerk Quadriga gGmbH

Quadriga was an annual German award sponsored by Netzwerk Quadriga GmbH, a non-profit organization based in Berlin. The award recognized four people or groups for their commitment to innovation, renewal, and a pioneering spirit through political, economic, and cultural activities.

The award consisted of a small statue resembling the quadriga atop the Brandenburg Gate in Berlin. Werkstatt Deutschland presented the award annually on German Unity Day, which commemorates German reunification in 1990. The award was presented by prominent individuals, including Viktor Yushchenko, and Mikhail Gorbachev.

== History ==
The award was first given in 2003. For the first two years, the award ceremony took place at Konzerthaus Berlin. From 2005 until 2008, the ceremony was held at Komische Oper Berlin opera house. In 2009, the award ceremony was hosted at the seat of the Foreign Office of Germany.

The announcement that Vladimir Putin would receive the award in 2011 was widely condemned. As a result of protests by Quadriga board members and former recipients, the 2011 awards and ceremonies were cancelled. Likewise, the Quadriga was not awarded in 2012.

== Recipients ==
=== 2003 ===
- Armin Mueller-Stahl, German actor
- Norman Foster, British architect
- Jean-Claude Juncker, Prime Minister of Luxembourg
- Einars Repše, Prime Minister of Latvia
- Amal Rifai, Odelia Ainbinder, and Sylke Tempel, authors of Wir wollen beide hier leben: Eine schwierige Freundschaft in Jerusalem

=== 2004 ===
- Recep Tayyip Erdoğan, Prime Minister of Turkey
- Éric-Emmanuel Schmitt, French author
- Thomas Quasthoff, German singer
- Šimon Pánek, Czech humanitarian
- Hamid Karzai, President of Afghanistan

=== 2005 ===
- Helmut Kohl, former German Chancellor
- Timothy Berners-Lee, British scientist, inventor of the World Wide Web
- Catherine McCartney, Claire McCartney, Donna McCartney, Gemma McMahon, Paula Arnold and Bridgeen Hagans, family of Robert McCartney, a victim of IRA terrorism
- Karīm al-Hussaynī, Āgā Khān IV, head of the Ismaili

=== 2006 ===
- Shimon Peres, Vice Prime Minister of Israel
- Riccardo Illy, Italian politician
- Florian Henckel von Donnersmarck, Ulrich Mühe, and Sebastian Koch, German artists in recognition of their work The Lives of Others
- Viktor Yushchenko, President of Ukraine

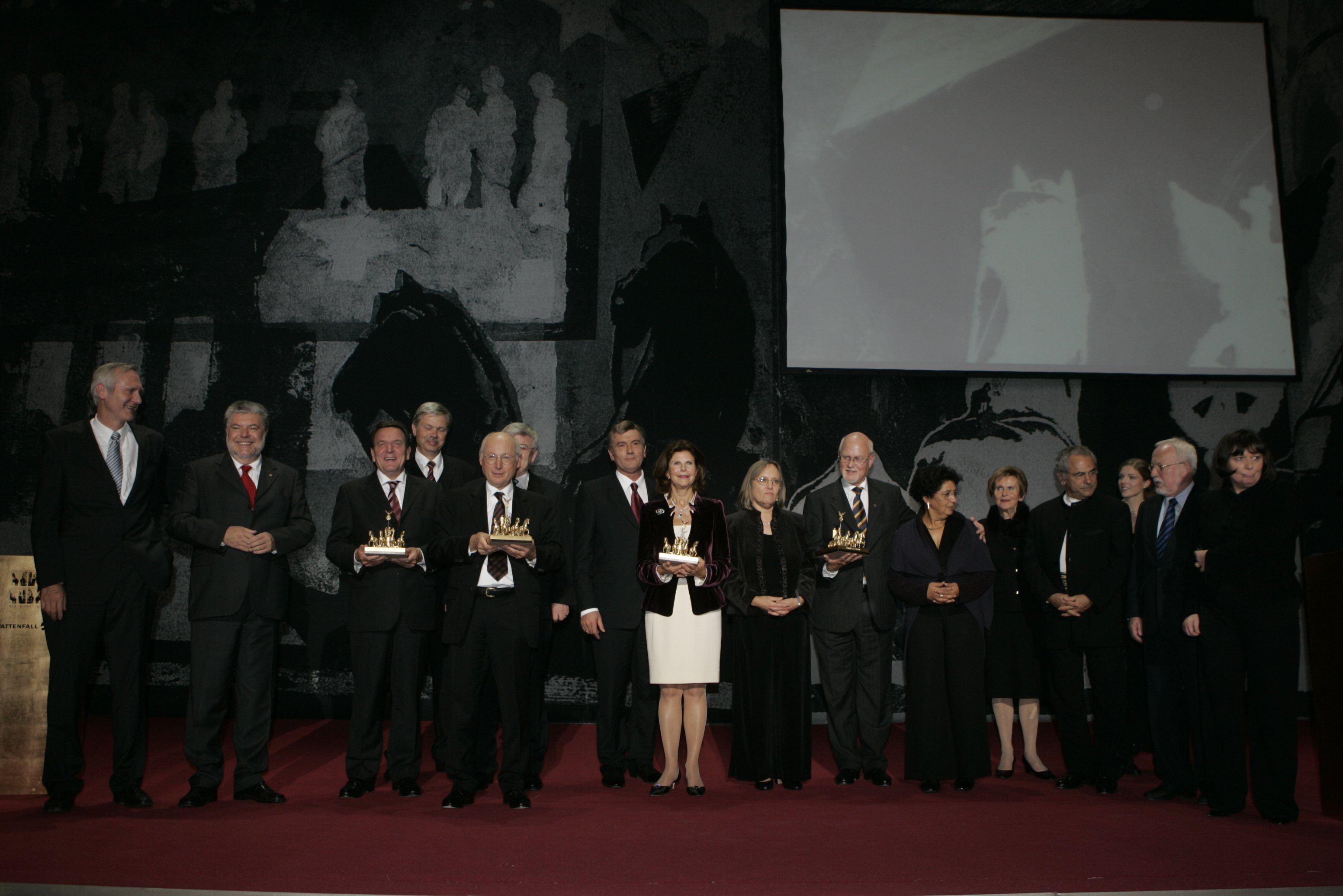
Recipients and laudators at Quadriga 2007

=== 2007 ===
- Gerhard Schröder, former German Chancellor
- Aicha El-Wafi and Phyllis Rodriguez, mothers of a perpetrator and a victim of the September 11, 2001 attacks seeking reconciliation
- Der Spiegel, represented by editor-in-chief Stefan Aust
- Queen Silvia of Sweden

=== 2008 ===
- Boris Tadić, president of Serbia
- Eckart Höfling, Franciscan and director of Venerável Ordem Terceira de São Francisco de Peniténcia in Rio de Janeiro
- Wikipedia, represented by Jimmy Wales
- Peter Gabriel, musician and human rights activist

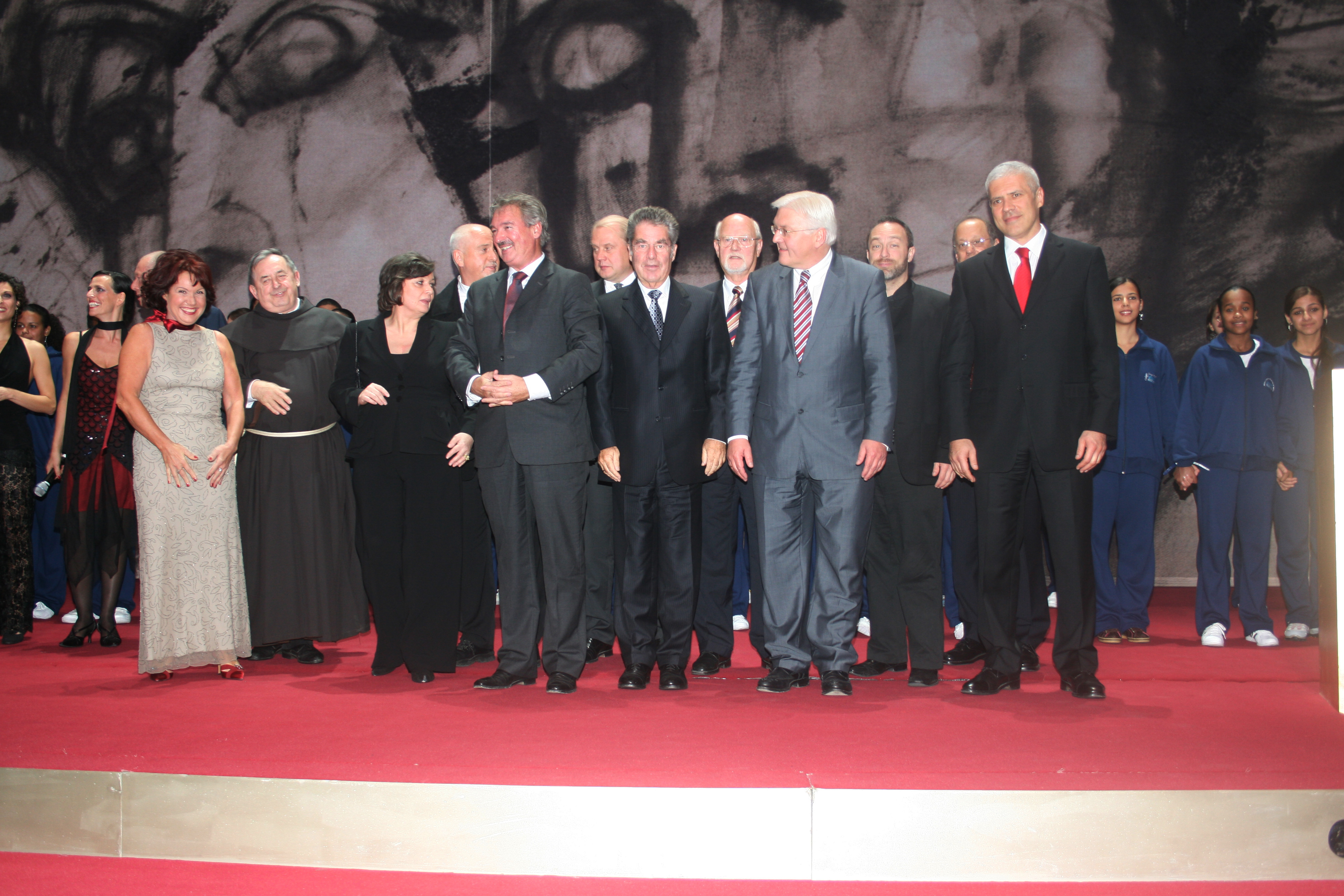
Recipients and laudators at Quadriga 2008

=== 2009 ===
- José Manuel Barroso, president of the European Commission
- Marius Müller-Westernhagen, musician
- Campaign Change for Equality, activists from Iran
- Václav Havel, author and former president of the Czech Republic
- Bärbel Bohley, initiator of the New Forum and artist
- Mikhail Gorbachev, Nobel Peace Prize Laureate and former president of the Soviet Union

=== 2010 ===
- George Papandreou : Power of Veracity
- Die Bundeswehr, represented by Karl-Theodor zu Guttenberg and Lieutenant General Günter Weiler : Service of Responsibility
- Dr. Wolfgang Schäuble and Lothar de Maizière : Architecture of Unification
- Dr. Albrecht and Kristina Hennig : Light of Empathy
- Olafur Eliasson : Art of Interaction

=== 2011 ===
- Cancelled

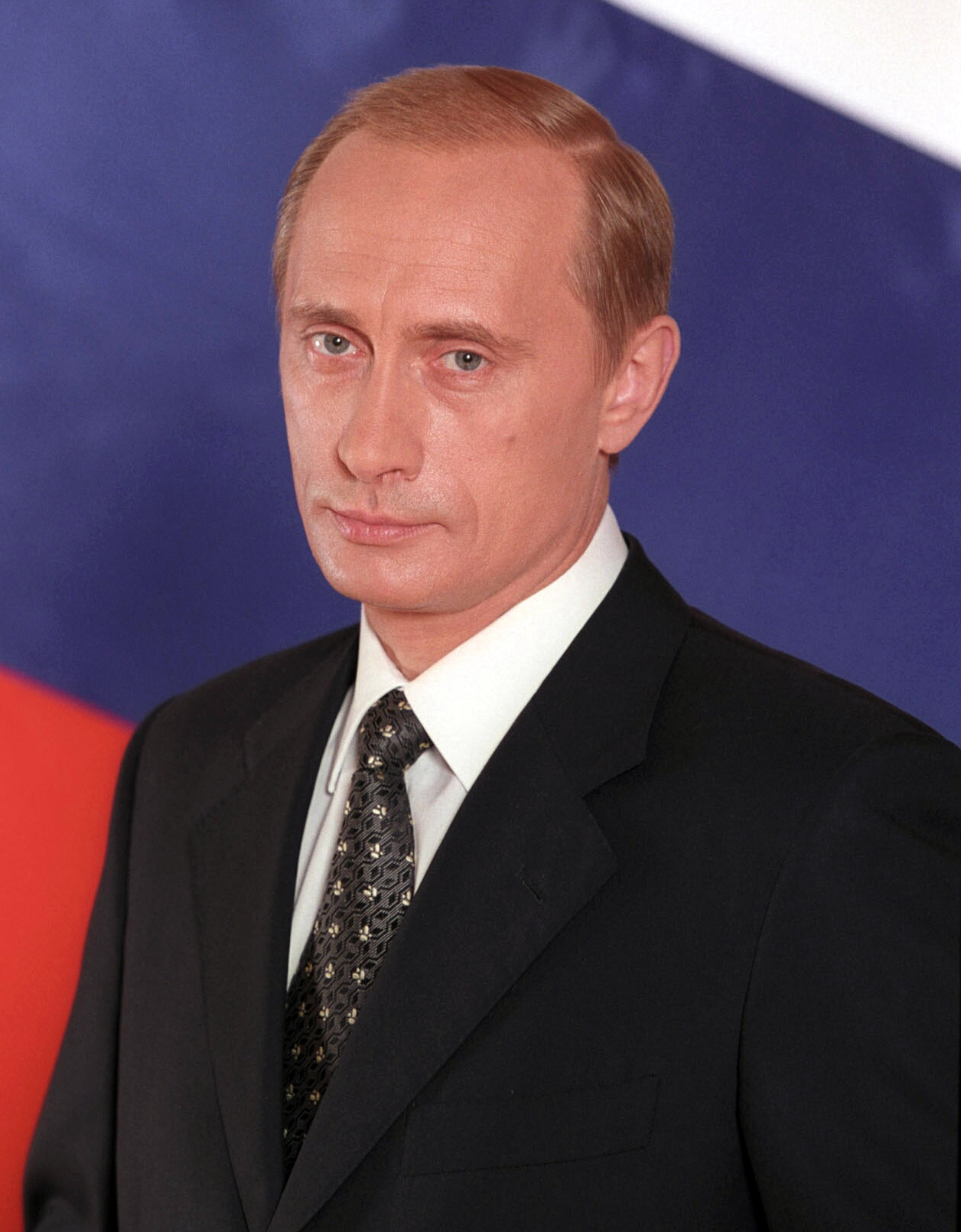
An attempt to honour Russian prime minister Vladimir Putin led former recipients to protest in July 2011.

The announcement that Prime Minister of Russia Vladimir Putin would be awarded the prize led to a public outcry. Quadriga board members Cem Özdemir of the German Green Party, Jimmy Wales of Wikipedia, and Heidelberg University history professor Edgar Wolfrum stepped down in protest. Former recipients Olafur Eliasson and Václav Havel decided to return their awards. The New York Times commented that from the volume of outcry the ranks of people feeling Putin, a former East Germany-assigned KGB agent and later chief, had rolled back democracy and human rights in Russia are apparently quite large. The organisers decided not to make any awards in 2011 as a result of the controversy. They released a statement on 16 July 2011 saying they acted "in light of the growing and unbearable pressure and the danger of further escalation" and that they deeply regretted hearing news of Havel's decision. The awards ceremony scheduled for that October was therefore cancelled.
