= Günter Weiler =

Günter Friedrich Weiler
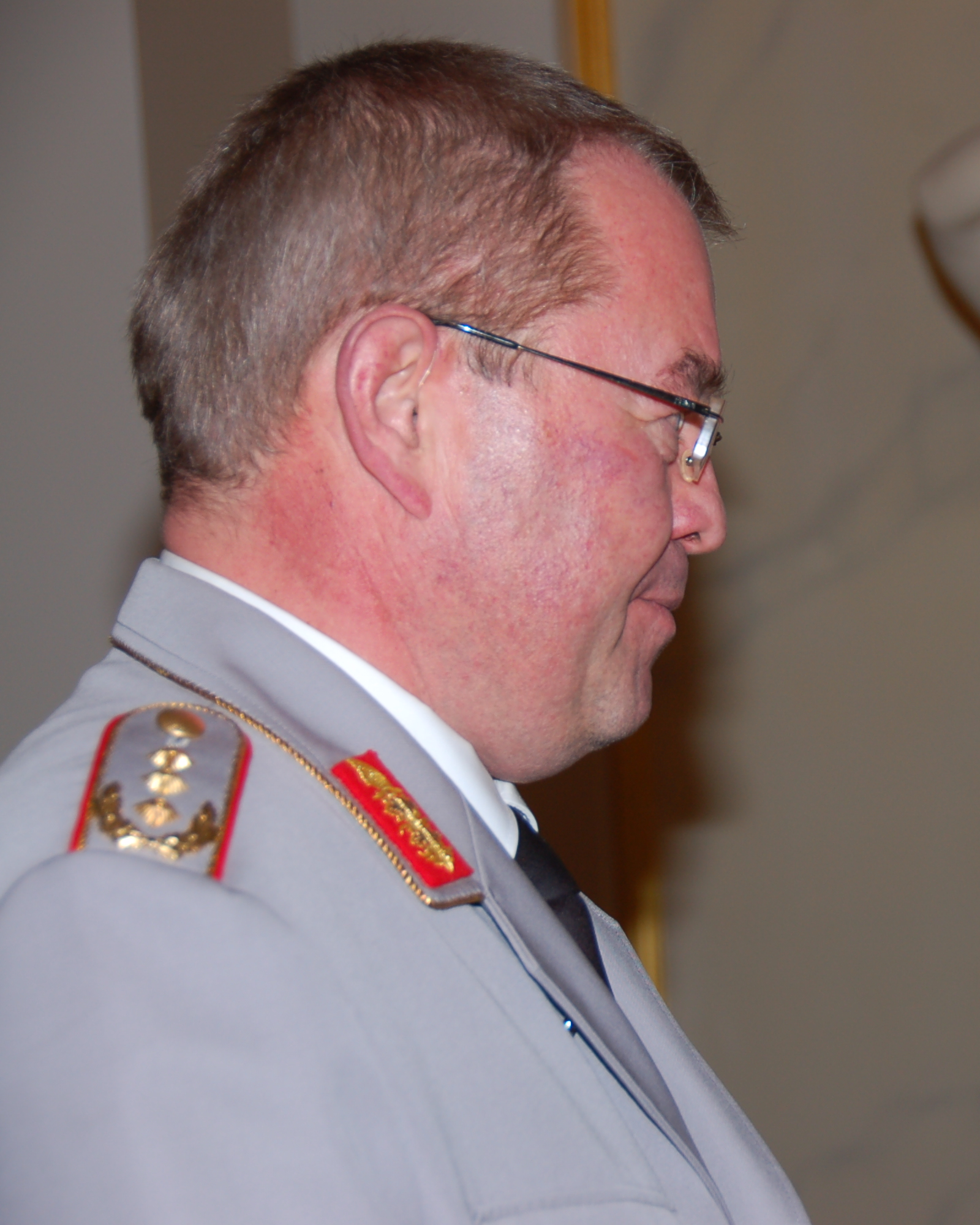
- Weiler at the ceremony in which he represented the Bundeswehr that, as an institution, was being presented the Quadriga Award in 2010.

Personal details
- Born: 27 April 1951 (age 74) Duisburg, West Germany
- Profession: Army Officer, Lieutenant General

Günter Friedrich Weiler (born 27 April 1951 in Duisburg, West Germany) is a retired lieutenant general of the German Army, the Bundeswehr. From 16 September 2010 until 9 April 2013, he was the Deputy Inspector General of the Bundeswehr.

== Initial service ==
Weiler joined the Bundeswehr in 1969 and was assigned to Battalion 44 in Arolsen. He started his training as an armored officer and in 1974, he became a tank platoon leader. He continued his service as an intelligence officer (S2). In 1976, Weiler became the company commander of the 2nd Company of Panzer Battalion 54 (later 64), in Wolfhagen.

In 1982, he entered the general staff course at the Bundeswehr Leadership Academy in Hamburg, where he graduated in 1984. Subsequent to his graduation, he was promoted to major and transferred to Münster, where he served on the staff of I Corps as a general staff officer for operations and training. One year later he was assigned as the chief of staff of the 30th Mechanized Brigade in Ellwangen, where he served from 1985 until 1987.

In 1987, Weiler was transferred to the Federal Ministry of Defence, in Bonn. He served there until 1989 as a military adviser for policy in the Ministry of Defence. After this assignment, he took command of Panzer Battalion 184 in Boostedt until 1991.

Subsequently, he was assigned to the Bundeswehr Leadership Academy in Hamburg, where he served as a lecturer on military leadership for the general staff course. In 1992, he returned to the Federal Ministry of Defense in Bonn, where he served from 1992 until 1994 as press secretary for Lieutenant General Helge Hansen, who was the Inspector-General of the German Army. From 1994 until 1997, Weiler served as adjutant to the Federal Minister of Defense, Volker Rühe.

== General officer ==
On 5 September 1997, Weiler took over the command of Panzer Brigade 39, in Erfurt until the unit was disbanded on 30 September 2001. In 1998, during this assignment, he deployed overseas with SFOR in Bosnia and Herzegovina, where he served as commander of the Multinational Brigade Centre in Rajlovac. In 1999, he was promoted to brigadier general.

In 2001, Weiler moved to Berlin where he served until 2005 as the first deputy in charge of the planning staff. Promoted to major general, on 1 March 2005 he took command of the 14th Panzergrenadier Division in Neubrandenburg. He led 14th Division for a year until April 2006.

Promoted to lieutenant general in 2006, Weiler was then assigned as the Deputy Inspector-General of the Army until autumn 2010. For his final assignment, Weiler was assigned as the Deputy Inspector General of the Bundeswehr on 16 September 2010, succeeding Lieutenant General Johann-Georg Dora. Lieutenant General Weiler retired from military service in 2013.

== Awards ==
On 3 October 2010, at a ceremony in Berlin, Weiler represented the Bundeswehr for the presentation of the Quadriga Award.

Military offices
Preceded by Generalleutnant Johann-Georg Dora	Deputy Chief of Staff of the Federal Armed Forces; September 2010 – April 2013	Succeeded by Generalleutnant Peter Schelzig
Preceded by Generalleutnant Jürgen Ruwe	Deputy Inspector of the Army; 1 March 2006 – 16 September 2010	Succeeded by Generalleutnant Bruno Kasdorf
