= Territorial Defense =

Territorial Defense or Territorial Defense Forces may refer to:

== Active ==
- Territorial Troops Militia, a Cuban paramilitary militia under the command of the MINFAR
- Territorial Forces (Finland)
- Territorial Troops (Kazakhstan)
- Territorial Defence Force (Poland), an active military reserve component of the Polish armed forces
- Territorial Defense Forces (Ukraine)
- Territorial Defense Student, Thailand

== Defunct ==
- Territorial Defense Forces (Poland), an armed force responsible for the internal security of Poland separate from the Polish Army from 1965 until 2008
- Territorial Defense (Yugoslavia), an independent formation of the People's Army of the former Socialist Federal Republic of Yugoslavia
- Territorial Defence Force of the Republic of Bosnia and Herzegovina
- Slovenian Territorial Defence
- Territorial defence battalions (Ukraine)

== See also ==
- Military reserve force
- Territorial Army (disambiguation)
