= Eckart Höfling =

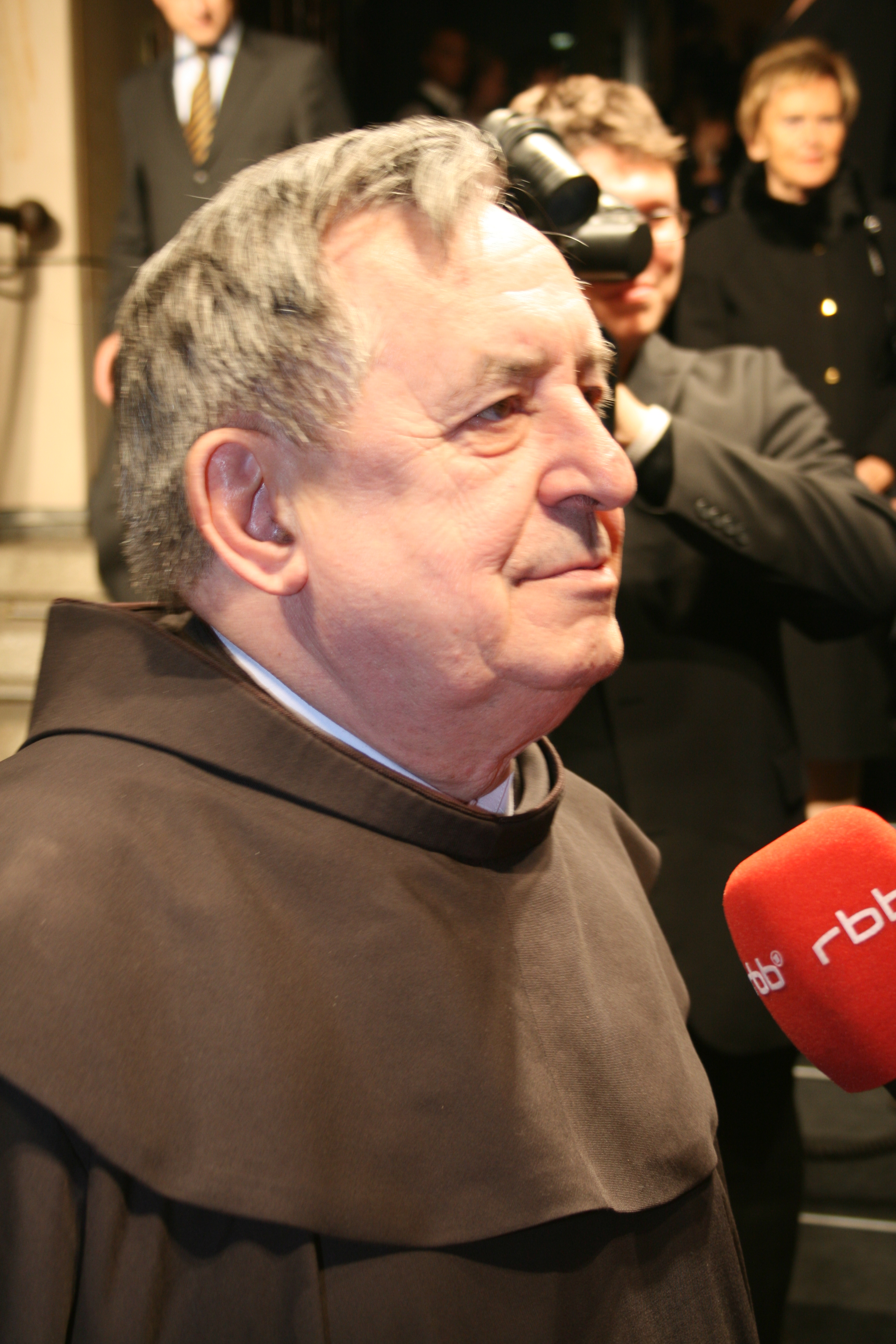

Eckart Höfling (28 October 1936 – 1 March 2014) was a German Catholic priest who worked combating poverty in Brazil.

Höfling was born in Langenprozelten, Lower Franconia. In 1949 Eckart Höflich completed his schooling in Würzburg and passed the legal clerk exams in 1952. He assumed a position in Karlstadt until 1957, when he joined the Franciscan Order. He was sent to Brazil for the first time in 1959/1960. He studied philosophy and theology and was ordained a priest on December 10, 1966 by the Bishop of Würzburg, Josef Stangl. He was sent to Brazil to lead two parishes there. He was awarded the German Federal Cross of Merit (Bundesverdienstkreuz) for his work in 2007, and the Quadriga Award in 2008.

== Projects and Positions ==
- 1972: Director of the Franciscan Spirituality College
- 1977: Created a social services network in Rio de Janeiro

He set up social centers in the favelas Vila Ideal and Prainha and organized regular medical care for the inhabitants of the favelas. The money for this project – over 2 million Euros in the past 30 years was given by the German Georg Ludwig Rexroth-Stiftung.

- 1986: Created a social services network in São Paulo
- 1987: Director of the Franciscian Social Services Network Third Order in Rio de Janeiro.
