= Territorial Army (Germany) =

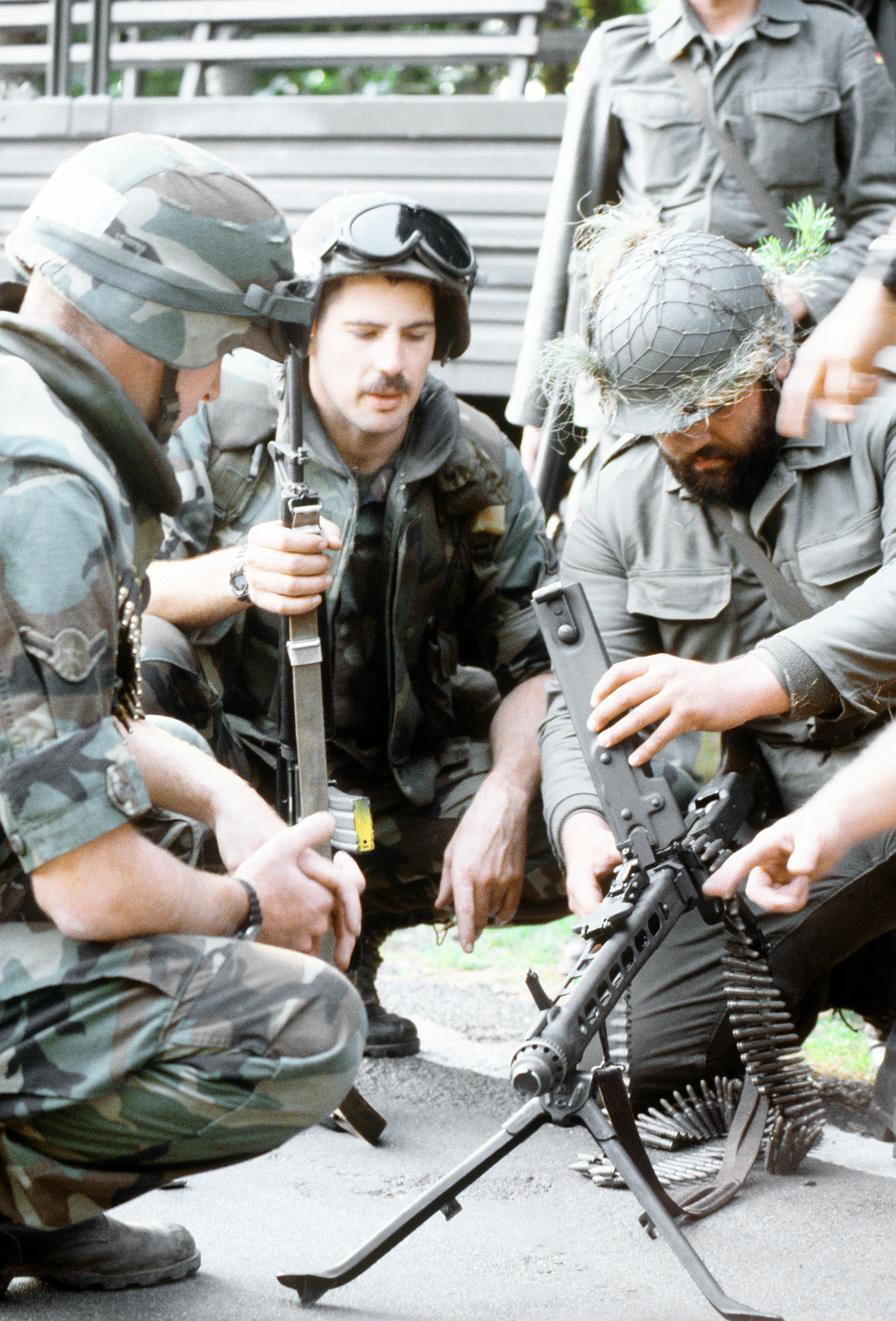
Reservists of the Home Defence Troops (JgBtl 942, Home Defence Regiment 94, WBK IV) in 1988 with U.S. Air Force personnel.

The Territorial Army (Territorialheer) was a military reserve force, part of the German Army of the Bundeswehr, which was responsible for territorial defence from the 1950s to c.2001.

In contrast to the field army, the territorial army was nationally commanded even in the anticipated wartime fighting period (similar to UK Transition To War). In contrast to the field army, it consisted largely of Reserve forces, which only grew in the event of a defense by conscription of reservists. The Heimatschutztruppe (Home Defence Troops) formed part of the Territorial Army.

The main function of the Territorialheer was to maintain the operational freedom of NATO forces through providing rear area defence against saboteurs, enemy special forces, and the like. It supported the field army, the other parts of the Bundeswehr, and the other NATO organisations operating in West Germany in "maintaining freedom of operations”. Liaison Missions were established with various parts of NATO's Allied Command Europe and Allied Forces Central Europe.

The territorial army was tasked with performing leadership and support tasks in the rear area. In cooperation with the Deutsche Bundespost, the Fernmeldetruppe operated a fixed telecommunications network to link military and civilian command posts. The Army Logistics Troops support the basic needs of the Bundeswehr and the repair of war materiel.

== Initial creation ==
In 1957, the "Office for Territorial Defence" was established as the highest Territorial Army authority. The Office for Territorial Defence was under the direct command of the Federal Ministry of Defence and commanded the Territorial Army. There were three Territorial Commands (de:Territorialkommando), including North, South, and Schleswig-Holstein, and up to six Wehrbereichskommandos (WBKs), military regional commands.

By 1985, each of the WBKs had two Heimatschutzbrigades (HSBs, home defence brigades). The three Territorial Commands were disbanded in 1994, though the Territorial Command East existed 1991–95.

== Dissolution ==
As part of the reorganization to the “completely renewed Bundeswehr” in 2001, the Territorial Army was finally dissolved and remaining national structures and tasks were integrated into the newly created Joint Support Service (Germany) (Streitkräftebasis). Responsibility for the "National Territorial Tasks" changed on October 1, 2001 from the Army Command (Heeresführungskommando) to the newly created Armed Forces Support Command (Streitkräfteunterstützungskommando). The new "National Territorial Commander" („Nationaler Territorialer Befehlshaber“) became the commander of the Armed Forces Support Command. Since 2013, comparable tasks have been taken over by the Bundeswehr Territorial Tasks Command (Kommando Territoriale Aufgaben der Bundeswehr).

== See also ==
- Territorial Defense Forces Division
