= Rūdninkai =

- Village
- Location within Lithuania
- Coordinates: 54.438°N 25.150°E
- Country: Lithuania
- County: Vilnius County
- Municipality: Šalčininkai District Municipality
- Eldership: Baltoji Vokė Eldership

Population (2021)
  - Total: 480
- Time zone: Eastern European Time (UTC+2)
  - Summer (DST): Eastern European Summer Time (UTC+3)

Rūdninkai is a village in Šalčininkai District Municipality, Vilnius County, Lithuania. The population was 480 in 2011.

== See also ==
- Rūdninkai Training Area
