= Multinational Corps Northeast =

NATO corps-level command under the Allied Joint Force Command Brunssum

Coordinates: 53°26′27.92″N 14°29′30.49″E

Multinational Corps North East
- Active: 18 September 1999–present
- Country: NATO: DEU; DNK; POL; BEL (since 2016); CAN (since 2016); HRV (since 2012); CZE (since 2005); EST (since 2004); FIN (since 2015); FRA (since 2015); GRC (since 2016); HUN (since 2013); ISL (since 2016); LVA (since 2004); LTU (since 2004); NLD (since 2015); NOR (since 2016); ROU (since 2008); SVK (since 2005); SVN (since 2009); SWE (since 2014, since 2024 as NATO member state); TUR (since 2015); GBR (since 2015); USA (since 2006)
- Part of: Allied Joint Force Command Brunssum
- HQ: Szczecin, Poland
- Engagements: War in Afghanistan (2001–2021)
- Website: mncne.nato.int

Commanders
- Corps Commander: Lieutenant General Dariusz Parylak (POL)
- Deputy Corps Commander: Major General Brian Nissen (DK)
- Chief of Staff: Brigadier General Ullrich Spannuth (DE)

The Multinational Corps Northeast was formed on 18 September 1999 at Szczecin, Poland, which became its headquarters. It evolved from what was for many years the only multinational corps in NATO, Allied Land Forces Schleswig-Holstein and Jutland (LANDJUT, in turn, a part of Allied Forces Northern Europe). From 1962 LANDJUT had been responsible for the defence of the Baltic Approaches from a headquarters at Rendsburg, Germany. It comprised the 6th Panzergrenadier Division and the Danish Jutland Division.

The Corps is under the operational command of the Allied Joint Force Command Brunssum.

== History ==
A tri-national working group was established following the July 1997 decision that Poland was to be admitted to NATO with the aim of establishing the corps as part of NATO’s Main Defence Forces. Its missions are three-fold: to participate in the collective defence of NATO territory, under Article 5 of the North Atlantic Treaty, to contribute to multinational crisis management including peace support operations, and to provide command and control for humanitarian, rescue, and disaster relief operations.

In July 1997, Ministers of Defence of Denmark, Germany and Poland decided to establish a Danish-German-Polish Corps. This corps was to be named Multinational Corps Northeast with its headquarters located in Szczecin, Poland. The Headquarters Allied Land Forces Schleswig-Holstein and Jutland (LANDJUT) from Rendsburg in Germany was to form the nucleus of this new command. Ministers of Defence of Denmark, Germany and Poland signed the Corps Convention in 1998, when Poland was not yet a member of NATO, but the date of the country’s accession (12 March 1999) had already been set. On 18 September 1999, the three Framework Nations – Denmark, Germany, Poland – could hoist their flags in the Baltic Barracks, the seat of the Corps in Szczecin. The Corps has significantly developed decisively since that time.

Though it is a NATO-affiliated formation, the Corps Convention is a trilateral agreement between the three nations. The positions of commander, deputy commander, and chief of staff rotate between the three nations. For common purposes of practice and training the corps was assigned to Joint Sub-Regional Command Northeast (JSRC NE), at Karup, Denmark. For Article 5 common defence purposes, the Corps was to have been assigned either to JSRC NE or the JSRC Centre at Heidelberg, Germany. Following the 2006-2010 reorganisation, it might have reported if designated for operations in Central Europe to Allied Force Command Heidelberg. The 14th Panzergrenadier Division of the German Army used to be part of the Corps, but disbanded at the end of 2008.

Due to its geographical location, the only NATO HQ East of the former Iron Curtain, Multinational Corps North East has a key function in the integration of new NATO member states. This is reflected in the structure of its personnel. Officers and NCO's from the Czech Republic, Estonia, Latvia, Lithuania and Slovakia are serving at Multinational Corps North East. Since April 2004, the flags of Estonia, Latvia and Lithuania have been fluttering at the Headquarters. In January 2005, Slovakia joined Multinational Corps Northeast, whereas the Czech Republic - in October 2005. The US flag was hoisted in November 2006 indicating the US membership in the Corps. In July 2008, first Romanian officers arrived to serve at the HQ. In August 2009, Slovenia entered the MNC NE family. In January 2012, Croatia officially became the twelfth nation of the Corps. In July 2013, the flag of Hungary was hoisted in Baltic Barracks. Sweden, then a non-NATO member, sent its representative to the Baltic Barracks in autumn 2014. In 2015 Turkish, British, French and Dutch officers started their tours of duty in Szczecin. Canada, Iceland, Belgium, Norway and Greece joined the Corps in 2016.

In 2005, during the Compact Eagle exercise, the headquarters achieved full operational capability.

From January to August 2007 a considerable number of personnel from Multinational Corps Northeast were put at the disposal of International Security Assistance Force's headquarters in Kabul, Afghanistan.

On 5 February 2015, a trilateral statement by the Corps Convention countries stated, in part, that:

- 'At the NATO Summit in September 2014 the Ministers of Defence from Germany, Poland and Denmark informed their colleagues and signed a statement that they had decided to raise the level of readiness of the Headquarters MNC NE from a Forces of Lower Readiness Headquarters to a High Readiness Force Headquarters and to enhance its capability to address future threats and challenges'.
- '..the level of readiness [of the corps will be raised] and fulfil a joint and regional role within the framework of NATO’s Readiness Action Plan, for both Assurance and Adaptation Measures in order to exercise command and control in the full range of Alliance missions in the north-eastern region (Estonia, Latvia, Lithuania and Poland) of the Alliance with the emphasis on Article 5 operations including command and control over the Very High Readiness Joint Task Force (VJTF). Additionally, MNC NE will execute command and control over the NATO Force Integration Units (NFIUs) in Estonia, Latvia, Lithuania and Poland.'

In June 2016, during the exercise Brilliant Capability 16 the Corps has become operationally capable to assume command of the VJTF, also referred to as the “spearhead force”.

On June 30th 2026, MNC-NE has its subordinate units in Latvia and Estonia transferred to I. German/Netherlands Corps.

== Mission in Afghanistan ==
The MNC NE staff formed part of the International Security Assistance Force (ISAF) during the War in Afghanistan (2001–2021).

MNC NE officially took over ISAF duties for the first time on 4 February 2007. Nearly 160 officers and non-commissioned officers spent over 6 month in Kabul. The majority of the MNC NE staff filled the posts in a newly established composite ISAF Headquarters in Kabul. From February to August 2010, the personnel of the Corps participated in the ISAF mission for the second time. The majority of approximately 130 officers and non-commissioned officers filled the posts at the ISAF Joint Command, a tactical level headquarters. Serving at different branches, they were gaining valuable mission experience and improving their skills. The third deployment with the participation of more than 120 soldiers from the Corps and partnering formations started in January 2014 and ended in January 2015. As soon as the ISAF mandate expired, the Resolute Support Mission commenced in January 2015.

Mission: International Security Assistance Force, Afghanistan

- February – August 2007
- February – August 2010
- January 2014 – January 2015

== Subordinate units ==
- HQ-Coy (Poland) (Szczecin)
- Command Support Brigade (Poland) (Germany) (HQ Szczecin)
- Multinational Division Northeast (Poland) (Lithuania)
- 1st Division (Lithuania)
  - Infantry Brigade Iron Wolf (Lithuania)
  - Infantry Brigade Griffin (Lithuania)
  - Infantry Brigade Aukštaitija (Lithuania)
- NATO Force Integration Unit Lithuania
- NATO Force Integration Unit Poland
- NATO Force Integration Unit Slovakia
- NATO Force Integration Unit Hungary

== Commanders ==
- 1999-2001 – (Denmark) LTG Henrik Ekmann
  - Deputy Corps Commander – (Poland) MG Edward Pietrzyk (since 2000 BG Zdzisław Goral)
  - Chief of Staff – (Germany) BG Joachim Sachau
- 2001-2003 – (Poland) LTG Zygmunt Sadowski
  - Deputy Corps Commander – (Germany) MG Rolf Schneider
  - Chief of Staff – (Denmark) BG Karl Nielsen
- 2004-2006 – (Germany) LTG Egon Ramms
  - Deputy Corps Commander – (Germany) MG Rolf Schneider (since 2004 MG Jan Andersen)
  - Chief of Staff – (Denmark) BG Karl Nielsen (since 2004 BG Henryk Skarżyński)
- 2006-2009 – (Poland) LTG Zdzisław Goral
  - Deputy Corps Commander – (Denmark) MG Jan Andersen (since 2008 MG Ole Køppen)
  - Chief of Staff – (Germany) BG Josef Heinrichs (since 2008 BG Josef Heinrichs)
- 2009-2012 – (Germany) LTG Rainer Korff
  - Deputy Corps Commander – (Poland) MG Ryszard Sorokosz (since 2012 MG Bogusław Samol)
  - Chief of Staff – (Denmark) BG Morten Danielsson
- 2013-2015 – (Poland) LTG Bogusław Samol (since December 2012)
  - Deputy Corps Commander – (Denmark) BG Morten Danielsson (since May 2013 MG Agner Rokos)
  - Chief of Staff – (Germany) BG Lutz Niemann
- 2015-2018 – (Germany) LTG Manfred Hofmann
  - Deputy Corps Commander – (Poland) BG Krzysztof Król (till January 2016 MG Agner Rokos)
  - Chief of Staff – (Denmark) BG Per Orluff Knudsen (till January 2016 BG Lutz Niemann)
- 2018-2021 – (Poland) LTG Sławomir Wojciechowski
  - Deputy Corps Commander – (Denmark) MG Ulrich Hellebjerg
  - Chief of Staff – (Germany) BG Wolf-Juergen Stahl
- 2021–2024 – (Germany) LTG Jürgen-Joachim von Sandrart
  - Deputy Corps Commander – (Denmark) MG Ulrich Hellebjerg, (Denmark) MG Peter Harling Boysen (since July 2023)
  - Chief of Staff – (Poland) BG Bogdan Rycerski
- 2025–present – (Poland) LTG Dariusz Parylak
  - Deputy Corps Commander – (Denmark) MG Brian Nissen
  - Chief of Staff – (Germany) BG Ullrich Spannuth

== See also ==
- Multinational Corps Southeast
