= Waffenfarbe =

Visual method used by the armed forces of Germany

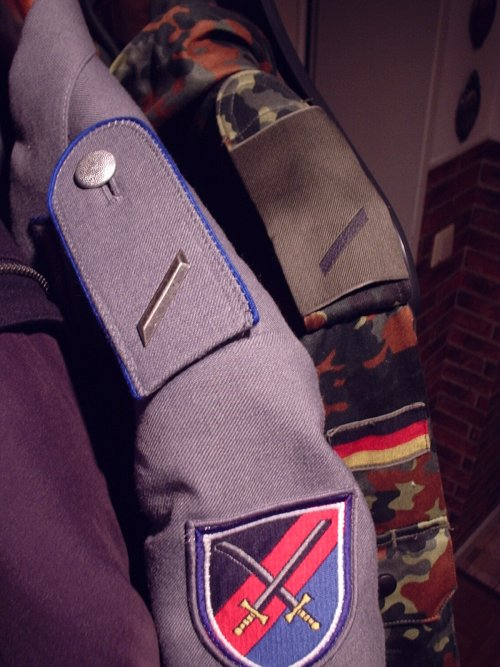
The blue border around the shoulder strap of this uniform indicates that its wearer is assigned to a logistics unit. Note that the epaulettes on the camouflage uniform (Bundeswehr) at the back do not have blue trim.

In the German military, Waffenfarbe (German: "branch-of-service colors" or "corps colors") is a visual method that the armed forces use to distinguish between different corps or troop functions in its armed services. The Waffenfarbe itself can take the form of the color of the collar patch, of the piping (embellishment) around the shoulder boards or shoulder marks, or—for enlisted ranks—of the piping around the collar and the garrison cap (Schiffchen). (In the latter places, NCOs wear cords of dark gold, officers silver, and generals gold.)

== Present ==
=== Army ===
The Bundeswehr uses a Waffenfarben color scheme to indicate troop types; they appear on the collar patch and as piping around the shoulder boards or straps showing a soldier's rank.

Colored soldiers' berets are slightly less differentiated than the Waffenfarben; in fact, corps or troop function is indicated by a beret badge.

==== Heer (army) ====
NBC

Artillery

MP

Signals

Reconnaissance

Army Aviation

Logistics

Infantry

Military band

Armoured forces

Engineers

Medical troops

=== Luftwaffe (air force) ===
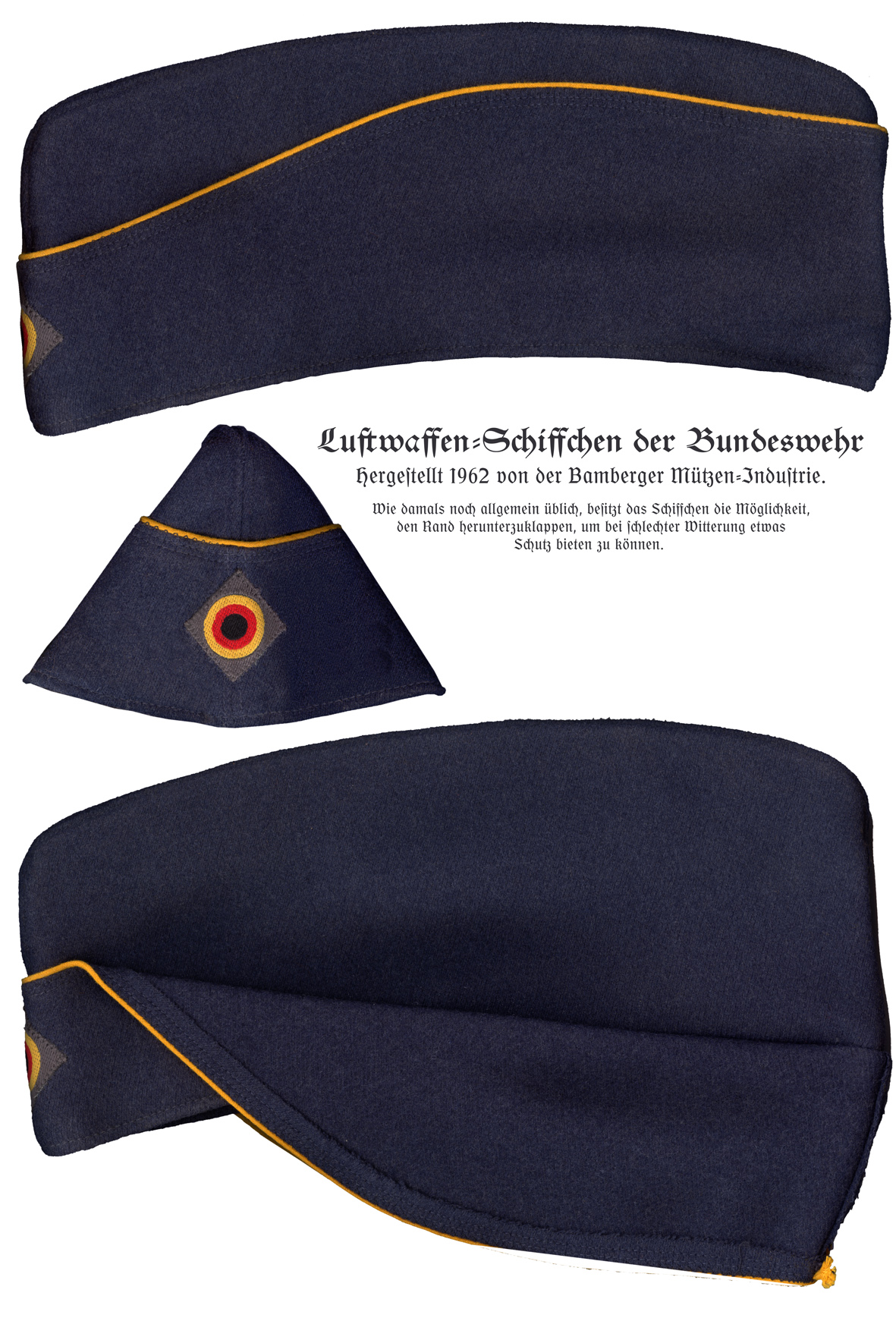
Luftwaffe Schiffchen with golden yellow piping (Bundeswehr)

The German Air Force uses a restricted color spectrum. While the air force normally uses golden yellow, officers "in the general staff service" (im Generalstabsdienst – there is no general staff as such in the Bundeswehr) wear wine-red, and generals bright red. The collar patches (Kragenspiegel) of generals and general staff service officers also differ from the normal air force design, as they are identical with the army ones.

=== Deutsche Marine (navy) ===
The German Navy uses various emblems above the rank stripes on the sleeves rather than function-specific colors to distinguish between corps. It traditionally did not use Waffenfarben.

== History ==
=== Waffenfarben used by the Deutsches Heer (1871–1919) ===
The Imperial German Army before 1915 did not have any defined use of Waffenfarben, except for cavalry. The Waffenfarben used in shoulder strap piping of the M1907/10 Feldrock was instead related to army corps, with exceptions to certain regiments due to seniority or distinctions.

Army Corps and regiments	Colors
I, II, IX, X, XII, and I Bavarian; 1st and 5th Foot Guards; 1st and 5th Guard Grenadiers; 109th, 110th, 116th Infantry Regiments	White
III, IV XI, XIII XV, XIX, and II Bavarian; 2nd Foot Guards; 2nd Guard Grenadiers; 11th Battalion of the 89th Grenadiers; 111th, 115th, 168th, 169th, 171st, 172nd Infantry Regiments	Red
V, VI, XVI, XVII, and III Bavarian; 3rd Foot Guards; 3rd Guard Grenadiers; Guards Fusiliers; 112th, 118th, 142nd Infantry Regiments	Yellow
VII, VIII, XVIII, XX; 4th Foot Guards, 4th Guard Grenadiers; 40th, 113th, 145th, 170th Infantry Regiments	Blue
XXI; 114th Infantry Regiment	Green

Branch of service was distinguished using colors on uniforms with the piping on the collars and cuffs of the uniform. This was only available in red (standard) for infantry, black for engineers and technical troops and green for Jägers. Other distinctions were made on the Feldmütze cap band.

In 1915 new regulations were introduced which simplified the earlier uniforms and introduced an early form of Waffenfarben for different services, however some regimental distinctions still remained.

Service branch or Regiments	Colors
Infantry	White
Jäger (light infantry)	Dark green
General Officers; Field Artillery; Uhlan	Red
Foot Artillery	Gold
Dragoon	Cornflower Blue
Pioneer (Combat engineer)	Black
Supply Troops	Blue
Telegraph Troops; Aviation Troops; Railway Troops	Grey

=== Waffenfarben used by the Reichsheer (1921–1935) ===
Regiment or Battalion type	Colors
General Officers; Artillery; Ordnance troops	Scarlet (Hochrot)
Staff Corps of the Reichsheer; Veterinary service	Carmine (Karmesin)
Infantry	White
Motor Transport	Rose-pink (Rosa)
Signals	Light brown
Cavalry	Golden yellow
Jäger (light infantry)	Dark green
Transport (horse-drawn)	Light blue
Medical Service	Dark blue
Pioneer (Combat engineer)	Black

=== Waffenfarben used by the Wehrmacht (1935–1945) ===
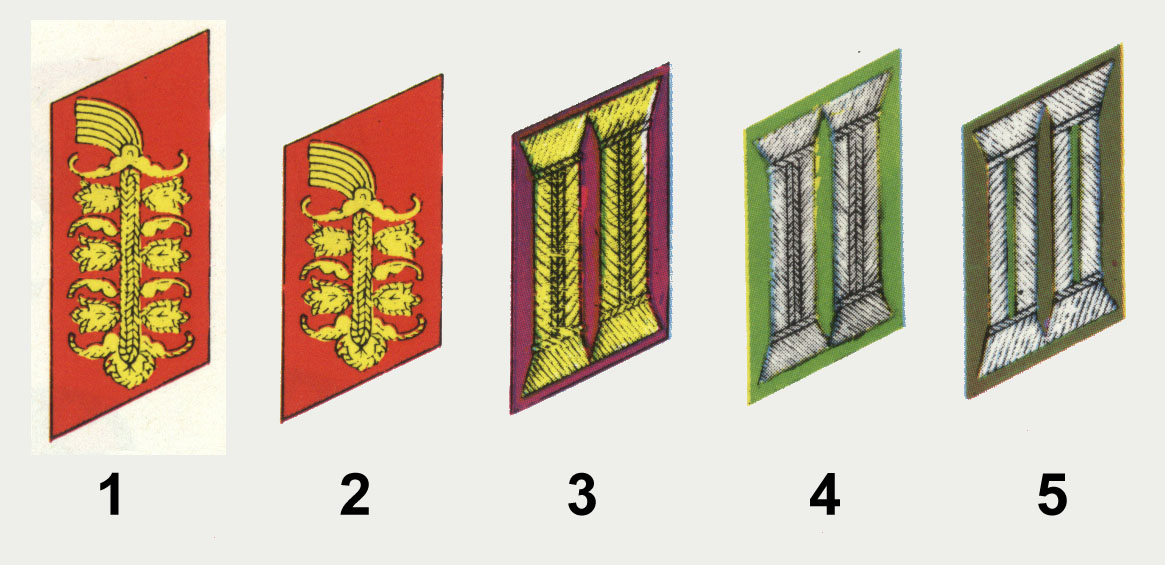
Heer officers' collar patches: 1, Field Marshal from 3 Apr 1941; 2, General, and Field Marshal to 3 Apr 1941; 3, OKW/OKH (dress); 4, Motorcycle Rifles or Panzergrenadiers (dress); 5, Light Infantry (service, backing cloth is collar-colored, only innermost stripes are in Waffenfarbe)

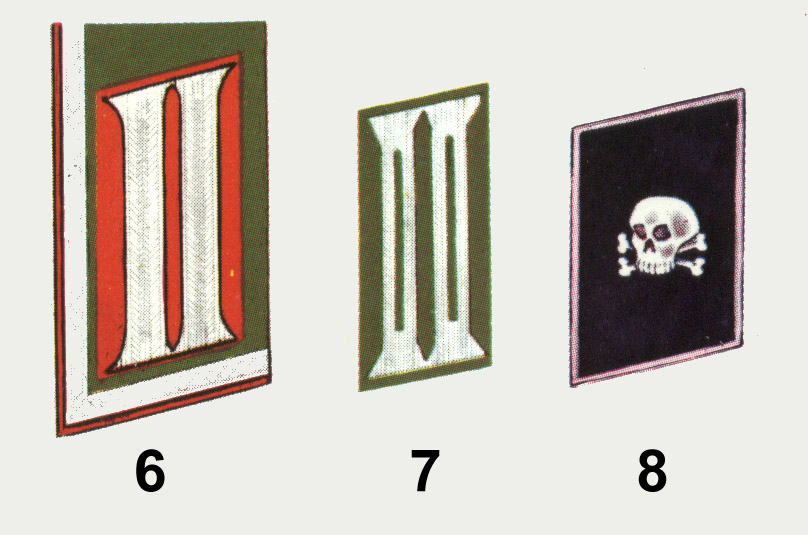
Heer collar patches: 6, Artillery NCO (dress); 7, Enlisted (service); 8, Panzers

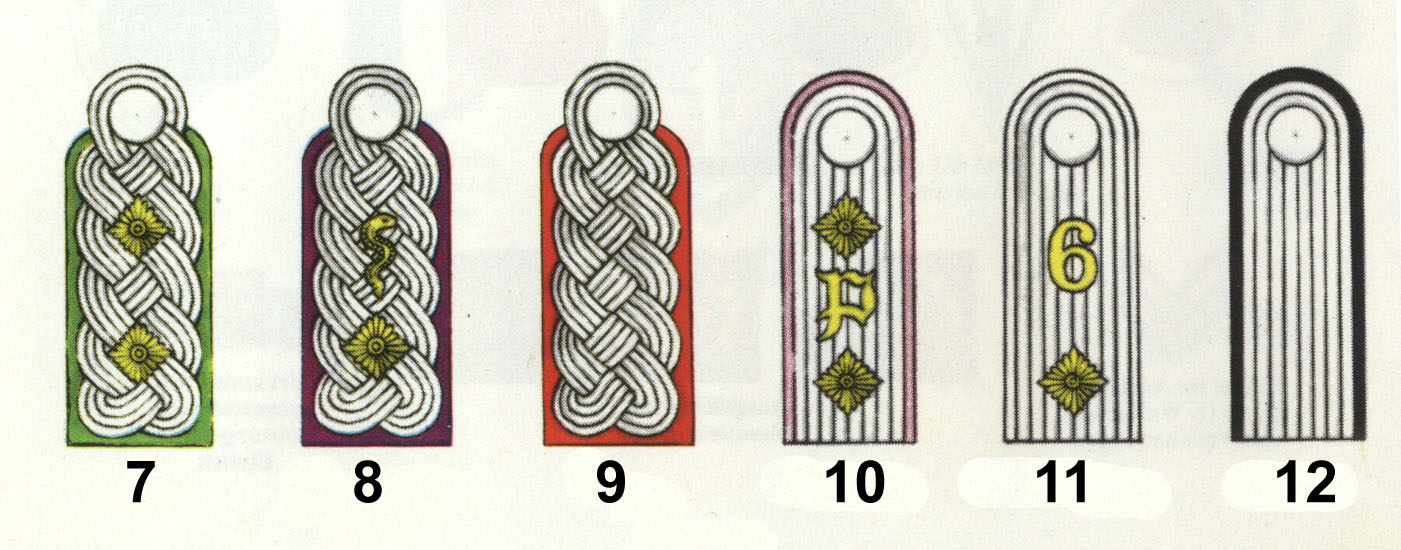
Wehrmacht officers' shoulderboards (the outermost colors i.e. the underlay are the Waffenfarbe which indicated function): 7, Oberst (Panzergrenadier); 8, Oberfeldveterinär (lieutenant colonel veterinarian); 9, Major (artillery); 10, Hauptmann (antitank); 11, Oberleutnant (6th Infantry); 12, Leutnant (engineer).

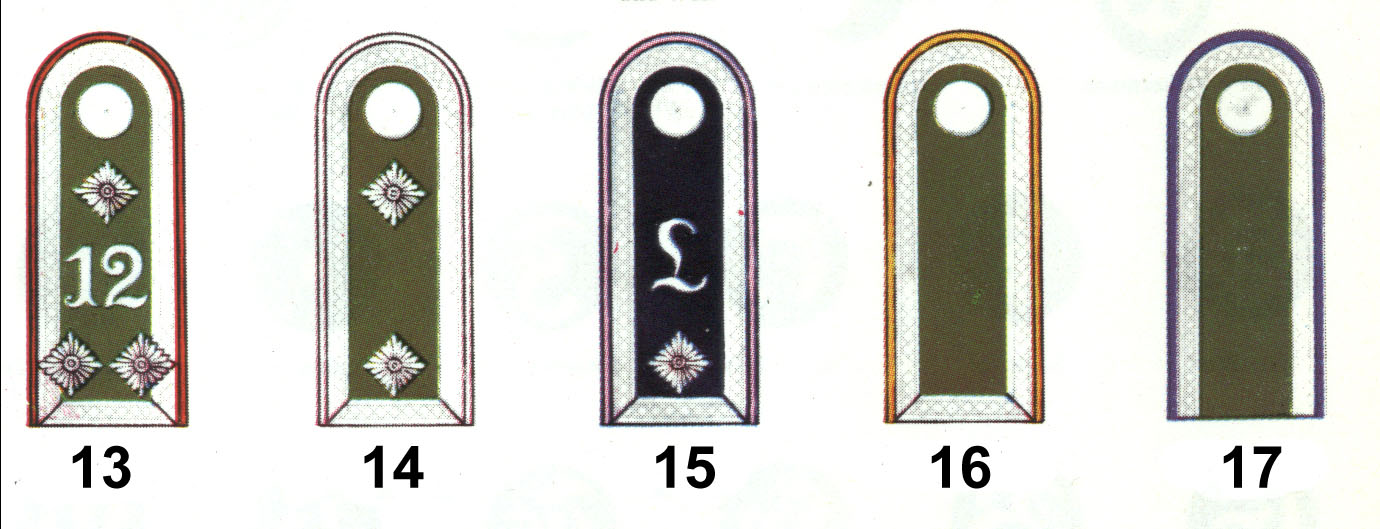
Shoulder straps of non-commissioned officers: 13, Stabswachtmeister, 12th Artillery; 14, Oberfeldwebel, infantry; 15, Feldwebel, Panzer-Lehr; 16, Unterwachtmeister, cavalry or recon; 17, Sanitäts-unteroffizier, medical

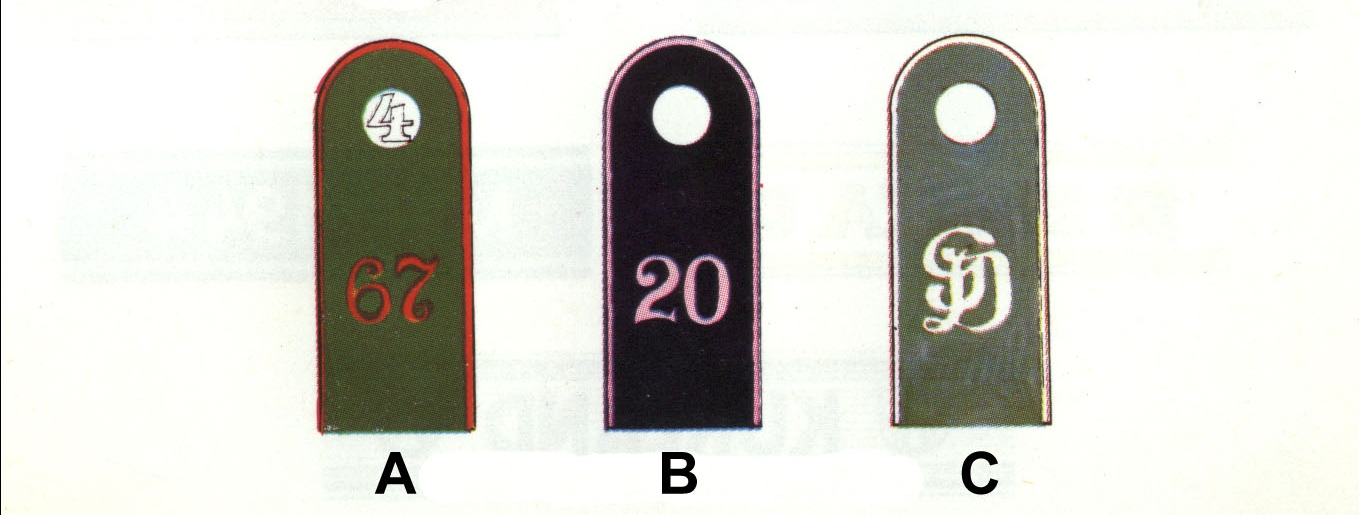
Shoulder straps of other ranks: A, Co. 4, 67th Artillery; B, 20th Panzer; C, Grossdeutschland Infantry Rgt.

In the German Heer and Luftwaffe, there was a strictly defined systematic of Waffenfarben on collar patches, and as uniform piping around the shoulder boards or shoulder straps. The Waffenfarben of the Reichswehr (1921 until c. 1935) were almost identical to those of the Wehrmacht.

=== Waffenfarben worn by the National People's Army (1956–1990) ===
East German (DDR) Nationale Volksarmee uniforms initially wore the Waffenfarben as worn by the Wehrmacht. Between 1974 and 1979, along with the introduction of uniforms with open collar and tie, the patches of the ground force uniforms were unified with a dark gray base and a white filling, along with a white collar piping; the piping of the shoulder boards/shoulder straps remained the only part carrying a Waffenfarbe. However, air/air defense forces, paratroopers, and generals as well as the navy continued to wear their specially designed Waffenfarbe patches.

The uniform of the Border Troops was distinguished from that of the NVA ground force and Air Force/Air Defense Force by a green armband with large silver letters identifying the wearer's affiliation, and a green cap band.

== Similarities in other armies ==
The use of Waffenfarbe to distinguish between troop functions was not unique to the Wehrmacht during World War II. After 1942, the Soviet Army, too, used analogous shoulder boards to distinguish troop functions: ground forces general officers and infantry used crimson, cavalry used blue, artillery and tank troops used red, and the rest of the ground forces used black, while the air force and airborne troops used sky blue. Likewise the British Army utilized analogous strips of cloth on the sleeves to likewise identify troop functions.

Today, Waffenfarbe schemes are also used in Austria, Finland, France, Hungary, Italy, Japan, Poland, Romania, Somalia and Switzerland. For a full list of analogous troop function insignia currently in use of the US Army, see United States Army branch insignia.

== See also ==
- Corps colours (Waffen-SS)
- Corps colours of the Sturmabteilung
