= 14th Panzergrenadier Division =

Coordinates: 53.542373°N 13.278265°E

- 14th Panzergrenadier Division insignia
- Active: 3 Oct 1990 - 31 Dec 2008
- Country: Federal Republic of Germany
- Role: Mechanized infantry
- Size: Division
- Part of: Multinational Corps Northeast

The 14th Panzergrenadier Division (14. Panzergrenadierdivision) was a German mechanized infantry formation. It was part of the Multinational Corps Northeast, a NATO corps that includes German, Polish, and Danish troops. In the wake of military restructuring aimed at reducing the size of the German land forces, the 14th Panzergrenadier Division was disbanded in 2008. The division's formation was notable in that it was a Bundeswehr formation created after the reunification of the Federal Republic of Germany and the German Democratic Republic, and which was formed in part from soldiers who had served in the National People's Army (NVA) of the GDR.

In 1990-1991, troops from the former 1st and 8th Motor Rifle Divisions and the 9th Armored Division of the NVA were used to form the three brigades of the 14th Panzergrenadier Division. These brigades were numbered as the 40th and 41st Panzergrenadier Brigades and the 42nd Panzer Brigade. In 1997, the 42nd Panzer Brigade was subordinated to the 13th Panzergrenadier Division and the 18th Panzer Brigade was subordinated to the 14th Panzergrenadier Division. Division headquarters was located at Neubrandenburg.

The division was given the mission of supporting international operations as well as the standard national defense mission. International operations the division took part in include:

- 1997/1998, 4th SFOR contingent in Bosnia.
- 1999, 2nd German contingent for KFOR in Kosovo.
- 2001, 3rd German contingent for SFOR and KFOR.
- 2003/2004, parts of the division deployed to the Balkans and Afghanistan.
- 2006, 13th German contingent for KFOR in Kosovo.

The division also provided support to civilians during the 2002 Elbe River flood.

== Commanders ==
Commanders of the Division:

Nr.	Name	Start of command	End of command
1	Generalmajor Ruprecht Haasler	1990	1994
2	Generalmajor Hans-Peter von Kirchbach	1994	1998
3	Generalmajor Friedrich Riechmann	1998	2001
4	Generalmajor Wolfgang Korte	2001	2002
5	Generalmajor Christian Trull	2002	2005
6	Generalmajor Günter Weiler	2005	2006
7	Generalmajor Bruno Kasdorf	2006	2006
8	Brigadegeneral Peter Goebel	2006	2008
