= List of military weapons of Germany =

These are lists of all military weapons ever used by German land forces throughout history.

- List of German military equipment of World War II
- List of weapons of West Germany
- List of modern equipment of the German Army

== Bibliography ==
- Gander, Terry & Chamberlain, Peter (1979). Weapons of the Third Reich: An Encyclopedic Survey of All Small Arms, Artillery and Special Weapons of the German Land Forces 1939-1945. New York: Doubleday. ISBN 0-385-15090-3.
