= Baltoji Vokė Eldership =

The Baltoji Vokė Eldership (Lithuanian: Baltosios Vokės seniūnija) is an eldership of Lithuania, located in the Šalčininkai District Municipality. In 2021 its population was 1703.
