= 37th Panzergrenadier Brigade =

- Panzergrenadier Brigade 37
- Active: 1991 – Present
- Country: Germany
- Type: Panzergrenadier
- Size: 6,200 troops
- Part of: 10th Panzer Division
- Garrison/HQ: Frankenberg, Saxony

Insignia
NATO Map Symbol
37
10

The 37th Panzergrenadier Brigade "Free State of Saxony" is a mechanized infantry brigade of the German Army (Bundeswehr Heer). The brigade is headquartered at Frankenberg, Saxony.

The history of the brigade began in 1990 with the dissolution of the GDR's National People's Army. In 1991, the brigade was established from the 7th Panzer Division of the NVA as Homeland Security Brigade 37. In 1993, the training of the first conscripts began. In 1995, the brigade was renamed Panzergrenadier Brigade 37, and relocated from Dresden to Frankenberg/Saxony, before it was renamed 1996 as Jägerbrigade 37. The brigade consisted at that time of a paratrooper battalion, a mountain light infantry battalion, and a Panzergrenadierbataillon. In 1997, the brigade assisted with the Oder flood. When the 39th Panzer Brigade (Bundeswehr) "Thüringen" was dissolved in 2001, the brigade took over the 391st Panzer Grenadier Battalion and the 39th Tank Battalion. The brigade transferred the 373th Parachute Battalion to the 31st Airborne Brigade. In 2001-2002 the brigade provided the bulk of the 4th German contingent to SFOR in Bosnia; 2003, the Panzerpionierkompanie 370 was disestablished in Doberlug-Kirchhain. In 2004-2005 the brigade provided forces for the 6th German ISAF task force and the 2nd rotation for the German "PRT Kunduz" in Afghanistan. In 2005, the dissolution of Self-Propelled Artillery Battalion 375 took place. In 2006, the brigade provided forces for the 11th German ISAF rotation and took over Logistics Battalion 131 in Bad Frankenhausen.

On January 25, 2007, the Panzerpionierkompanie 390 was disbanded at Bad Salzungen. The brigade again became a panzergrenadier formation on 1 April 2007. In addition, Repair Battalion 131 became Logistics Battalion 131 and Pioneer Battalion 701 the Panzerpionierbataillon 701. In addition, the Panzeraufklärungsbataillon 13 was reclassified to the Aufklärungsbataillon 13. The Jägerbataillon 371 was reclassified in July 2007 as Panzer Grenadier Battalion 371. In 2008, Mountain Battalion 571 dissolved.

The brigade is now part of the 10th Panzer Division (Bundeswehr).

== Organization ==
As of 1 March 2025 the brigade is organized as follows:

- Panzergrenadier Brigade 37 (Panzergrenadierbrigade 37), in Frankenberg
  - Staff and Support Company Panzergrenadier Brigade 37 (Stabskompanie Panzergrenadierbrigade 37), in Frankenberg
  - Reconnaissance Battalion 13 (Aufklärungsbataillon 13), in Gotha with Fennek reconnaissance vehicles and KZO drones
  - Panzergrenadier Battalion 212 (Panzergrenadierbataillon 212), in Augustdorf with 44x Puma infantry fighting vehicles
  - Panzergrenadier Battalion 371 (Panzergrenadierbataillon 371), in Marienberg with 44x Marder infantry fighting vehicles
  - Panzergrenadier Battalion 391 (Panzergrenadierbataillon 391), in Bad Salzungen with 44x Marder infantry fighting vehicles
  - Panzer Battalion 393 (Panzerbataillon 393), in Bad Frankenhausen with 44x Leopard 2A6 main battle tanks
  - Panzergrenadier Battalion 909 (Panzergrenadierbataillon 909), in Marienberg (Reserve unit)
  - Panzer Artillery Battalion 375 (Panzerartilleriebataillon 375), in Weiden in der Oberpfalz
  - Panzer Engineer Battalion 701 (Panzerpionierbataillon 701), in Gera
  - Supply Battalion 131 (Versorgungsbataillon 131), in Bad Frankenhausen
  - Signal Company Panzergrenadier Brigade 37 (Fernmeldekompanie Panzergrenadierbrigade 37), in Frankenberg
