= Paratrooper Battalion 261 (Bundeswehr) =

Coordinates: 49°24′19″N 6°54′32″E

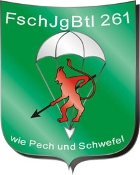
- Insignia of the Paratrooper Battalion 261
- Active: September 1956 – 31 March 2015
- Country: Germany
- Branch: German Army
- Type: Airborne infantry
- Size: About 1,000 troops
- Part of: Airborne Brigade 26, Special Operations Division
- Garrison/HQ: Lebach, Germany
- Mottos: Wie Pech und Schwefel (lit. Like Pitch and Sulfur, German idiom with a similar meaning as "thick as thieves")
- Anniversaries: September 3
- Engagements: Somali Civil War; Bosnian Civil War; Kosovo War; Afghanistan War: Operation Harekate Yolo I; Operation Oqab

Commanders
- Current commander: Lieutenant Colonel Thomas Blank

The Paratrooper Battalion 261 (Fallschirmjägerbataillon 261) was one of the three combat battalions of the German Army's Airborne Brigade 26, which was a part of the Special Operations Division. Paratrooper Battalion 261 was fully airmobile and could act both as air assault infantry or be dropped by parachute into the area of operations.

== History ==
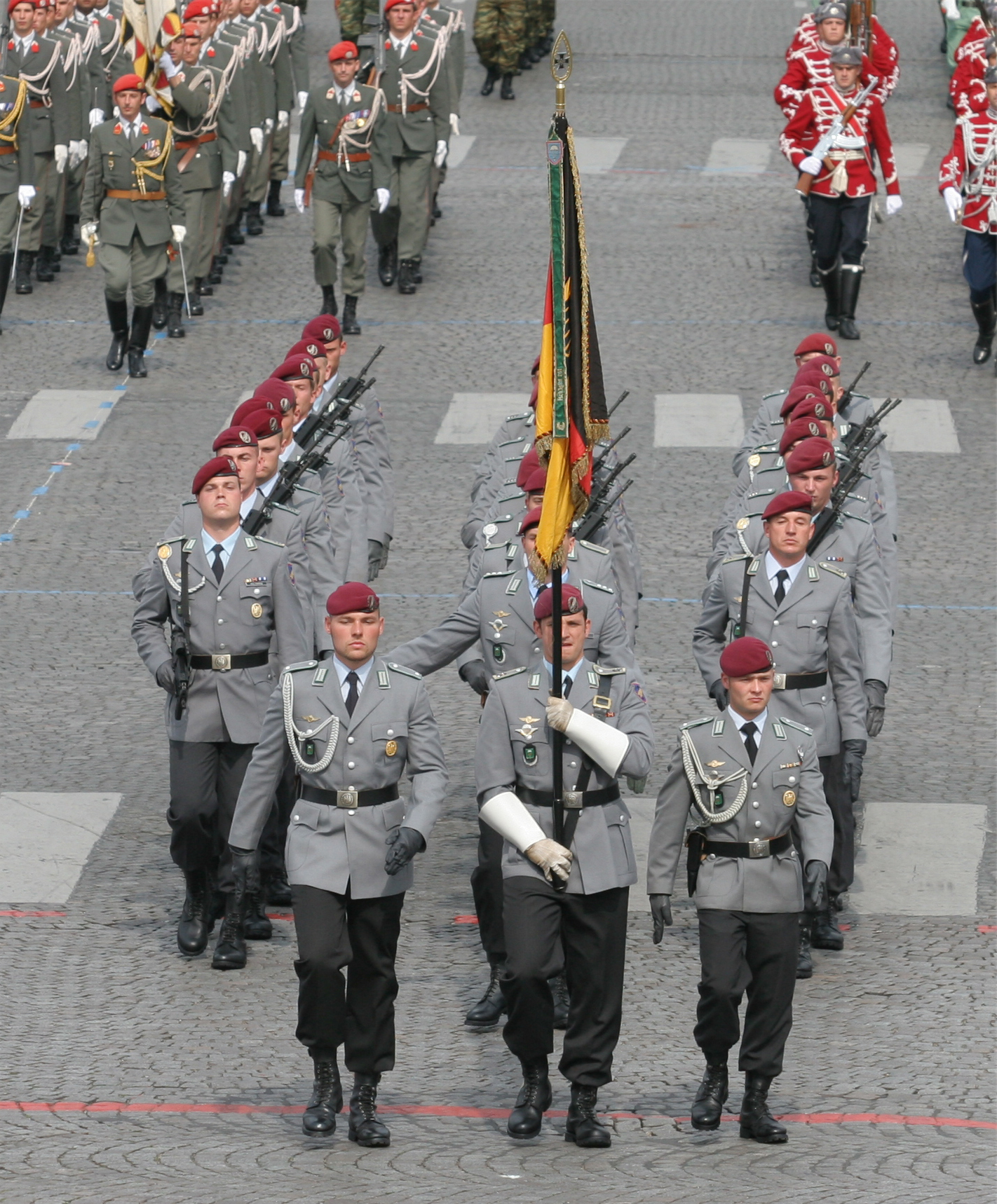
A detachment from Paratrooper Battalion 261 marching at the international military parade on Bastille Day 2007

The battalion was activated as Airborne Infantry Battalion 9 (Luftlandejägerbataillon 9) on September 3, 1956, being the first combat battalion of the now defunct Airborne Brigade 25. Since 1961, the headquarters of the battalion have been hosted in Lebach. The arsenal of the battalion was attacked and robbed in 1969. Four of the sentries were killed in cold blood. The unit temporarily belonged to the multiliteral AMF(L) Brigade. It has taken part in overseas operations since 1993 when large parts of the battalion deployed to Somalia. Since then, Paratrooper Battalion 261 has taken part in numerous operations all over the globe and spent much time in northern Afghanistan battling the resurgent Taliban insurgency. In 2007, thirty troops received the great honour of an invitation to the French Bastille Day parade.

Following a restructuring of the German armed forces, the battalion was disbanded on 31 March 2015 and merged into the newly raised Paratrooper Regiment 26.

== Structure ==
- Paratrooper Battalion 261
  - Command- and support company
    - K9 platoon
    - Scout platoon
  - 2nd Parachute Infantry Company
  - 3rd Parachute Infantry Company
  - 4th Parachute Infantry Company
  - 5th Fire Support Company
  - 6th Parachute Infantry Company (Training and Force Protection)

== See also ==
- Special Operations Division (Germany)
- Fallschirmjäger
- Kunduz Province Campaign
- Maroon beret
