= Corps colours of the Sturmabteilung =

Military insignia of Nazi Germany

Corps colours, or Troop-function colours (German: "Waffenfarben") were worn in the German Wehrmacht from 1935 until 1945 as discrimination criteria between several branches, special services, corps, rank groups, and appointments of the ministerial area, the general staff, the Oberkommando der Wehrmacht (OKW), up to the military branches of the Heer, Luftwaffe and Kriegsmarine. With the formation of the Waffen-SS (Armed SS) and so-called Gesamt-SA (Common Sturmabteilung) by simultaneous new-structuring in line with military principles, corps colours were introduced to these organisations as well.

== Corps colours of the SA ==
After the incorporation of the SA-Obergruppe Ostmark to the main SA organisation in March 1938, the formation of Gesamt-SA began in January 1939. The new sub-division structure was as follows:

- Allgemeine SA (General SA) with Active SA-I (between 18 and 35 years) and Active SA-II (between 35 and 45 years)
- SA-Reserve (above 45 years), and
- SA-Wehrmannschaften (en: SA-Defence crews).

However, two former SA branches converted to other paramilitary organisations. The previous Motor-SA was transferred to the National Socialist Motor Corps – NSMC (Nationalsozialistisches Kraftfahrerkorps – NSKK), and the Flieger-SA together with the Flieger-SS formed the new National Socialist Flyers Corps – NSFC (Nationalsozialistisches Fliegererkorps – NSFK).

In line with new subdivision to branches and service areas corps colours were introduced. The former so-called SA-group colours were abolished. The systematic of corps colours was introduced to NSKK and NSFK as well. The new introduced SA-corps colours were almost identical to those of the Wehrmacht.

=== SA-Corps colours ===
The synoptic table below contains some corps colours and examples used by the SA from 1939–45.

| Troops, unit, appointment | Corps colour | Example | Remark |
|---|---|---|---|
| Supreme SA-Command & Control (German: Oberste SA-Führer) | Carmine-red (Karmesin-rot) | | SA-Obergruppenführer (OF-8) |
| SA-Chief of Staff (German: Chef des Stabes der SA); SA-Group Staffs (German: SA-Gruppenstaebe) | Scarlet (hell-rot) | | SA rank insignias (SA Chief of Staff (OF-9)) worn by Ernst Röhm in 1933: Collar patches; Shoulder insignia |
| SA-Signals (German: Nachrichten-SA) | Lemon yellow (Zitronen-gelb) | | SA-Hauptsturmführer (OF-2); Identical corps colour to the Heer and Waffen-SS |
| Mounted-SA (German: Reiter-SA) | Golden-yellow (Gold-gelb) | | Identical corps colour to the Wehrmacht and Waffen-SS |
| SA-Hunters/SA-Infantry units (German: SA-Jäger/SA-Schuetzen) | Hunter-green (Jäger-gruen) | | SA-Haupttruppführer (OR-7) |
| Medical-SA (German: Sanitaets-SA) | Royal-blue (Königs-blau) | | SA-Obersturmbannführer (OF-4) |
| Navy-SA (German: Marine-SA) | Navy-blue (Marin-blau) | | SA-Oberführer (OF-5a) |
| SA-Foot standartes (German: SA-Fußstandarten) | Grey (Grau) | | SA-Gruppenführer (OF-7) |
| Engineer-SA (German: SA-Pioniere) | Black (Schwarz) | | SA-Brigadeführer (OF-6); Identical corps colour to the Heer and Waffen-SS |

== See also ==
- Comparative military ranks of World War II
- Glossary of Nazi Germany
- World War II German Army ranks and insignia
