= Structure of the German Army =

Overview article

The following lists German active and reserve units within the structure of the German Army. Reserve units do not possess any heavy equipment and their personnel is intended as replacements for losses sustained by regular units.

The German Army is commanded by the Inspector of the Army (Inspekteur des Heeres) based at the Army Command (Kommando Heer) in Strausberg near Berlin. The training centers are supervised by the Army Training Command in Leipzig.

The Army's combat formations comprise two Panzer (armoured) divisions and the lighter Rapid Forces Division. There are five heavy brigades and half a light infantry brigade in the two panzer divisions. Battalions and regiments are directly subordinate to brigades or to divisions as divisional troops. Regiments are rare. German infantry battalions field 1,000 men, considerably larger than most NATO armies.

The list describes the current structure of the army, which replaced the previous structure NEW HEER (NEU HEER). Under the heading of “transformation”, the structure of the army is subject to constant change in small steps. With this current structure, the HEER 2011 structure was achieved. The first fundamental step was the establishment of the Army Command with the simultaneous elimination of the Army Command and the Army Command Staff on October 1, 2012. At this point in time (October 2012), the Army comprised around 68,000 active soldiers. The HEER 2011 structure was largely achieved at unit level at the end of 2015. At the same time, the first changes occurred compared to the originally intended ARMY 2011 structure. For example, the planned non-active 414 Tank Battalion was transformed into a German-Dutch active tank battalion and subordinated to the Dutch 43 Mechanised Brigade.

After the Russian invasion of Ukraine from February 2022, NATO began expanding its forces in the three Baltic states of Estonia, Latvia, and Lithuania. In November 2023 a press release from the German Ministry of Defence specified that a new armoured brigade, de:Panzerbrigade 42, would be established in Lithuania. It was planned to comprise Panzer Battalion 203 from Augustdorf, and Panzergrenadier Battalion 122. Initial command elements were planned to start moving in the second quarter of 2024, and a staff to establish the brigade in the fourth quarter of 2024. The overall NATO headquarters supervising this area is Multinational Corps North East. Later the new brigade's planned designation was changed to 45th Panzer Brigade.

== Unit designations ==
The German Army uses the term "Jäger" to describe its light infantry units and formations. Mountain infantry is designated as Gebirgsjäger, while Paratroopers are designated as Fallschirmjäger. Armoured units equipped with main battle tanks are designated as Panzer formations, while mechanized infantry units equipped with tracked infantry fighting vehicles are designated as Panzergrenadier formations.

== Army Command ==
- Army Command (Kommando Heer), in Strausberg
  - 1st Panzer Division (1. Panzerdivision), in Oldenburg
  - 10th Panzer Division (10. Panzerdivision), in Veitshöchheim
  - Rapid Forces Division (Division Schnelle Kräfte), in Stadtallendorf
  - Homeland Defence Division (Heimatschutzdivision), in Berlin
  - Training Command (Ausbildungskommando), in Leipzig
  - Army Development Office (Amt für Heeresentwicklung), in Cologne
  - Central Army Storage (Zentrales Langzeitlager), in Herongen
  - Central Army Storage (Zentrales Langzeitlager), in Pirmasens
  - Central Mobilisation Base (Zentraler Mobilmachungsstützpunkt), in Brück

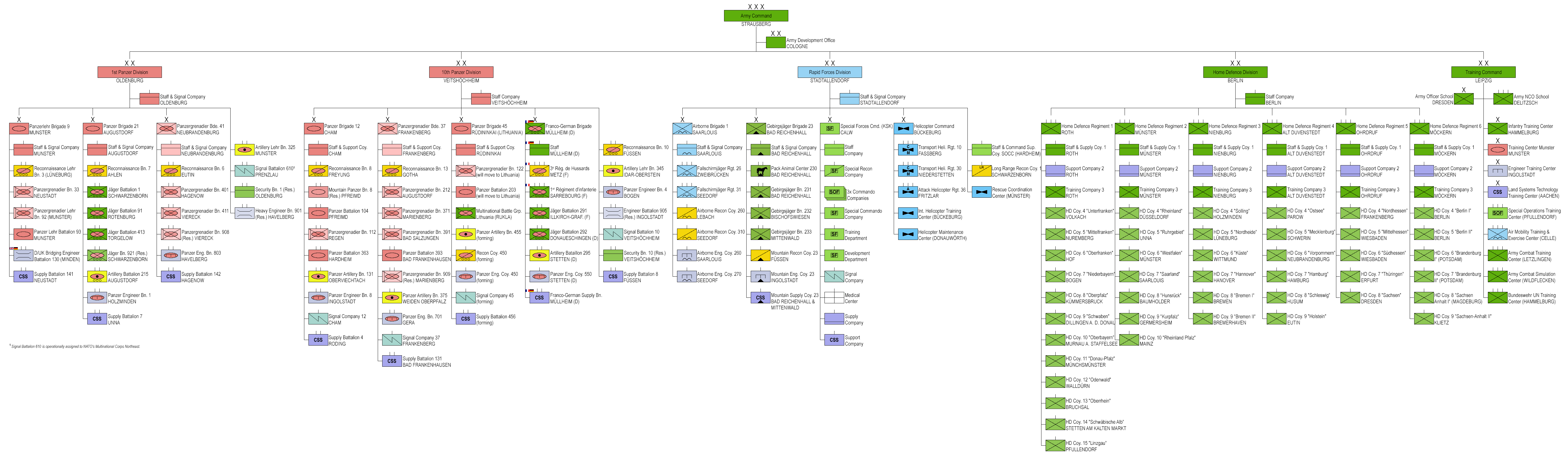
Structure of the German Army (without integrated Dutch units) in 2025 (click to enlarge)

=== 1st Panzer Division ===
- 1st Panzer Division (1. Panzerdivision), in Oldenburg
  - Staff and Signal Company 1st Panzer Division (Stabs- und Fernmeldekompanie 1. Panzerdivision), in Oldenburg
  - Artillery Lehr Battalion 325 (Artillerielehrbataillon 325), in Munster with 24x PzH 2000 155mm self-propelled howitzers, 8x M270 MLRS multiple rocket launch systems, KZO drones and 2x Euro-Art COBRA counter-battery radars
  - Signal Battalion 610 (Fernmeldebataillon 610), in Prenzlau (Operationally assigned to NATO's Multinational Corps Northeast)
  - Heavy Engineer Battalion 901 (Schweres Pionierbataillon 901), in Havelberg (Reserve unit)
  - Security Battalion 1 (Sicherungsbataillon 1), in Oldenburg (Reserve unit)
  - Army Air Defense Activation Staff (Aufstellungsstab Heeresflugabwehr), in Lüneburg

Note: The 1st Panzer Division also has the Royal Netherlands Army's 43rd Mechanized Brigade under its command.

==== Panzerlehr Brigade 9 ====
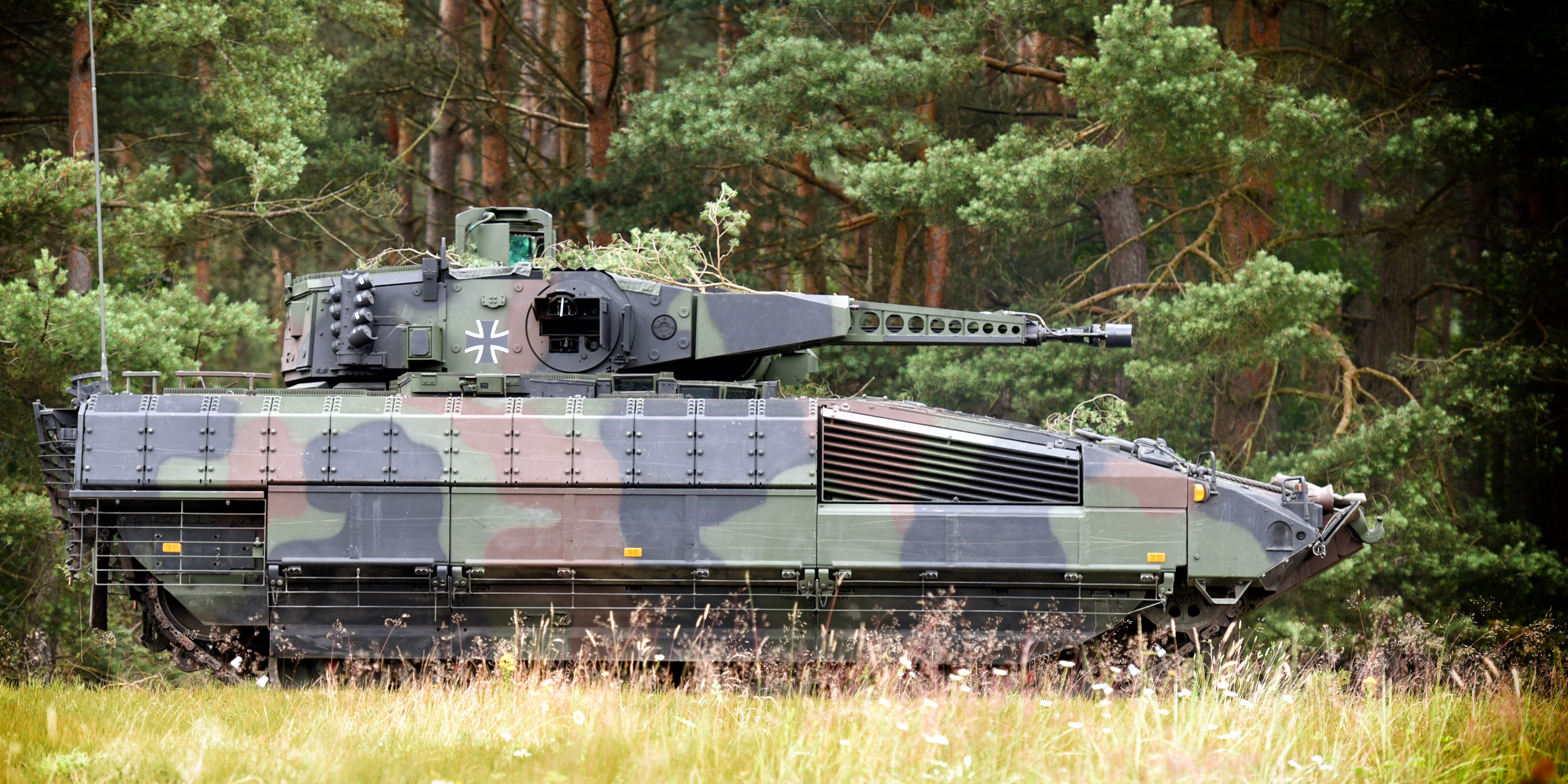
Panzergrenadier Battalion 33 Puma infantry fighting vehicle

- Panzerlehr Brigade 9 (Panzerlehrbrigade 9), in Munster
  - Staff and Signal Company Panzerlehr Brigade 9 (Stabs- und Fernmeldekompanie Panzerlehr Brigade 9), in Munster
  - Reconnaissance Lehr Battalion 3 (Aufklärungslehrbataillon 3), in Lüneburg with Fennek reconnaissance vehicles and KZO drones
  - Panzergrenadier Battalion 33 (Panzergrenadierbataillon 33), in Neustadt am Rübenberge with 44x Puma infantry fighting vehicles
  - Panzergrenadier Lehr Battalion 92 (Panzergrenadierlehrbataillon 92), in Munster with 44x Puma infantry fighting vehicles
  - Panzer Lehr Battalion 93 (Panzerlehrbataillon 93), in Munster with 44x Leopard 2A6 main battle tanks
  - German/British Bridging Engineer Battalion 130 (Deutsch/Britische Pionierbrückenbataillon 130), in Minden
  - Supply Battalion 141 (Versorgungsbataillon 141), in Neustadt am Rübenberge

Note: "Lehr" units are training support units.

==== Panzer Brigade 21 ====
- Panzer Brigade 21 (Panzerbrigade 21), in Augustdorf
  - Staff and Signal Company Panzer Brigade 21 (Stabs- und Fernmeldekompanie Panzergrenadier Brigade 21), in Augustdorf
  - Reconnaissance Battalion 7 (Aufklärungsbataillon 7), in Ahlen with Fennek reconnaissance vehicles and KZO drones
  - Jäger Battalion 1 (Jägerbataillon 1), Schwarzenborn with Boxer armoured personnel carriers
  - Jäger Battalion 91 (Jägerbataillon 91), in Rotenburg an der Wümme with Boxer armoured personnel carriers
  - Jäger Battalion 413 (Jägerbataillon 413), in Torgelow with Boxer armoured personnel carriers
  - Jäger Battalion 921 (Jägerbataillon 921), in Schwarzenborn (Reserve unit)
  - Artillery Battalion 215 (Artilleriebataillon 215), in Augustdorf with RCH 155 155 mm self-propelled howitzers (reactivated 7 October 2025)
  - Panzer Engineer Battalion 1 (Panzerpionierbataillon 1), in Holzminden
  - Supply Battalion 7 (Versorgungsbataillon 7), in Unna

==== Panzergrenadier Brigade 41 ====
- Panzergrenadier Brigade 41 (Panzergrenadierbrigade 41), in Neubrandenburg
  - Staff and Signal Company Panzergrenadier Brigade 41 (Stabs- und Fernmeldekompanie Panzergrenadier Brigade 41), in Neubrandenburg
  - Reconnaissance Battalion 6 (Aufklärungsbataillon 6), in Eutin with Fennek reconnaissance vehicles and KZO drones
  - Panzergrenadier Battalion 401 (Panzergrenadierbataillon 401), in Hagenow with 44x Marder infantry fighting vehicles
  - Panzergrenadier Battalion 411 (Panzergrenadierbataillon 411), in Viereck with 44x Marder infantry fighting vehicles
  - Panzergrenadier Battalion 908 (Panzergrenadierbataillon 908), in Viereck (Reserve unit)
  - Panzer Engineer Battalion 803 (Panzerpionierbataillon 803), in Havelberg
  - Supply Battalion 142 (Versorgungsbataillon 142), in Hagenow

=== 10th Panzer Division ===
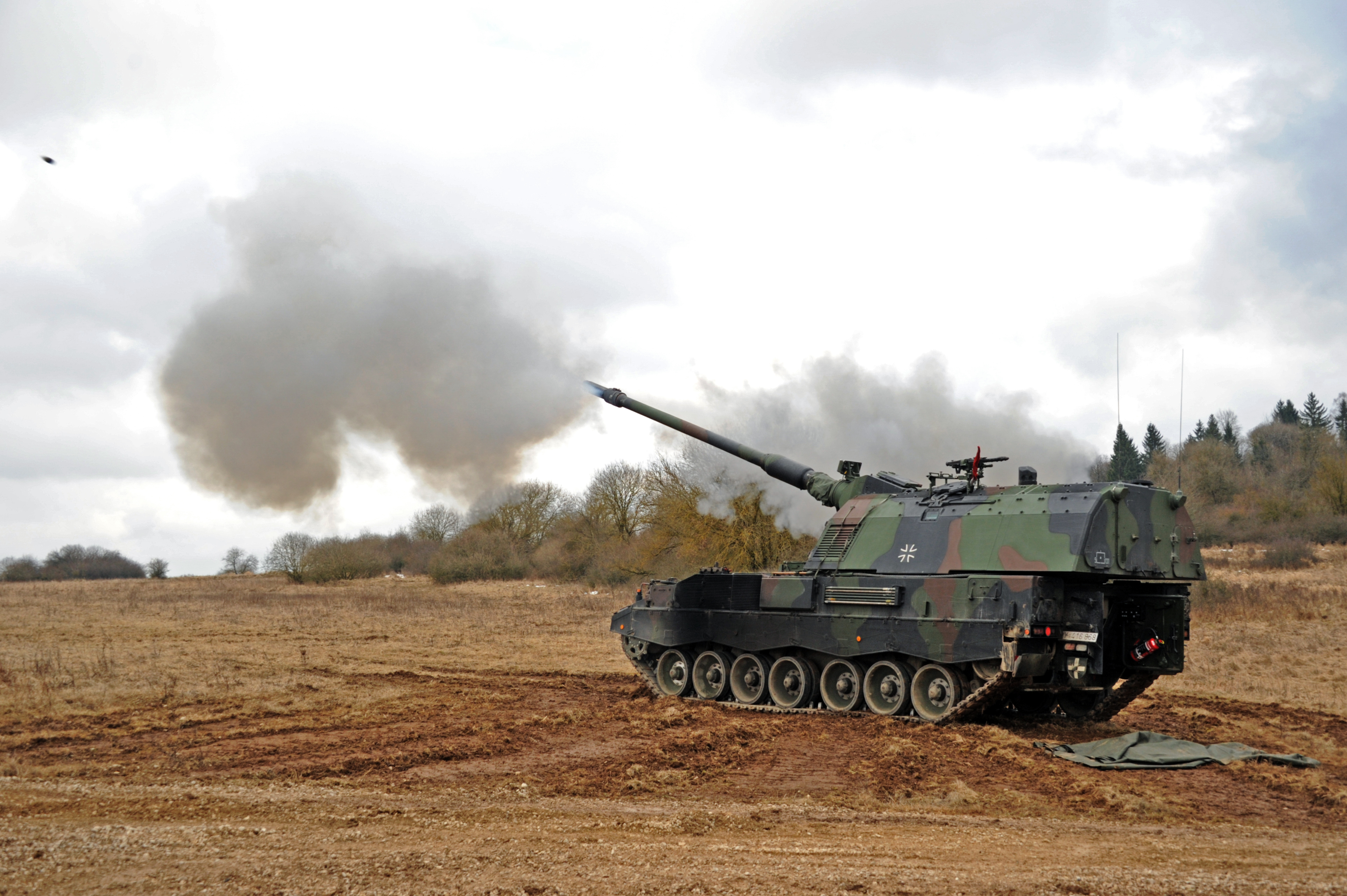
Panzer Artillery Battalion 131 PzH 2000 self-propelled howitzer

- 10th Panzer Division (10. Panzerdivision), in Veitshöchheim
  - Reconnaissance Battalion 10 (Aufklärungsbataillon 10), in Füssen with Fennek reconnaissance vehicles and KZO drones
  - Artillery Lehr Battalion 345 (Artillerielehrbataillon 345), in Idar-Oberstein with 24x PzH 2000 155 mm self-propelled howitzers, 8x M270 MLRS multiple rocket launch systems, 12x 120 mm mortars, KZO drones and 2x Euro-Art COBRA counter-battery radars
  - Panzer Engineer Battalion 4 (Panzerpionierbataillon 4), in Bogen
  - Engineer Battalion 905 (Pionierbataillon 905), in Ingolstadt (Reserve unit)
  - Signal Battalion 10 (Fernmeldebataillon 10), in Veitshöchheim
  - Security Battalion 10 (Sicherungsbataillon 10), in Veitshöchheim (Reserve unit)
  - Supply Battalion 8 (Versorgungsbataillon 8), in Füssen

Note: The 10th Panzer Division also has the Royal Netherlands Army's 13th Light Brigade under its command.

==== Panzer Brigade 12 ====
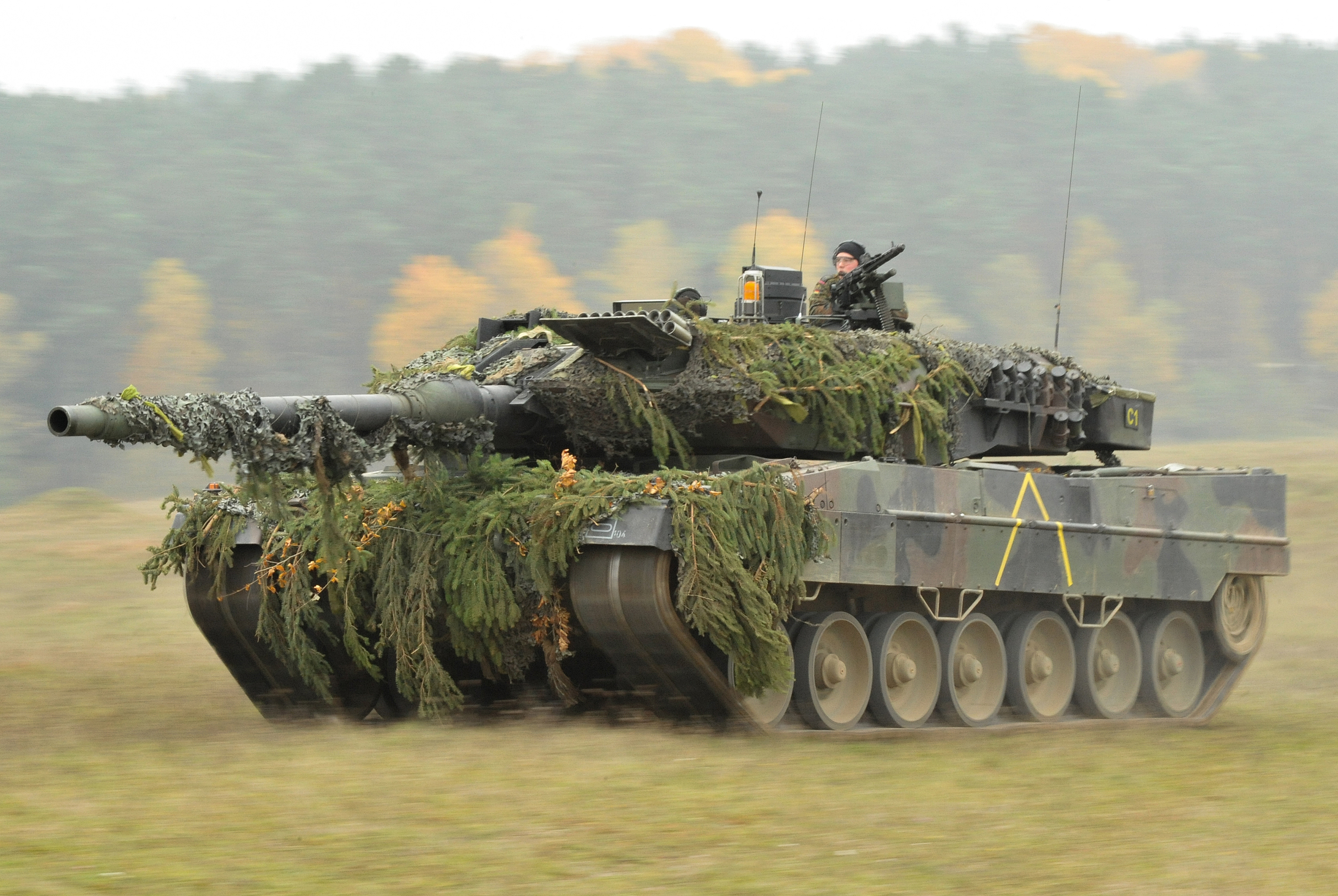
Panzer Battalion 104 Leopard 2A6 tank

- Panzer Brigade 12 (Panzerbrigade 12), in Cham
  - Staff and Support Company Panzer Brigade 12 (Stabs- und Unterstützungskompanie Panzerbrigade 12), in Cham
  - Reconnaissance Battalion 8 (Aufklärungsbataillon 8), in Freyung with Fennek reconnaissance vehicles and KZO drones
  - Mountain Panzer Battalion 8 (Gebirgspanzerbataillon 8), in Pfreimd (Reserve unit, 1 of 3 tank companies active in peacetime and assigned to Panzer Battalion 104)
  - Panzer Battalion 104 (Panzerbataillon 104), in Pfreimd with 44x Leopard 2A6 main battle tanks
  - Panzer Battalion 363 (Panzerbataillon 363), in Hardheim with 44x Leopard 2A6 main battle tanks
  - Panzergrenadier Battalion 112 (Panzergrenadierbataillon 112), in Regen with 44x Puma Infantry fighting vehicles
  - Panzer Artillery Battalion 131 (Panzerartilleriebataillon 131), in Weiden in der Oberpfalz with 16x PzH 2000 155mm self-propelled howitzers, 8x M270 MLRS multiple rocket launch systems, KZO drones and 2x Euro-Art COBRA counter-battery radars — will move to Oberviechtach in 2027
  - Panzer Engineer Battalion 8 (Panzerpionierbataillon 8), in Ingolstadt
  - Supply Battalion 4 (Versorgungsbataillon 4), in Roding
  - Signal Company Panzer Brigade 12 (Fernmeldekompanie Panzerbrigade 12), in Cham

==== Panzergrenadier Brigade 37 ====
- Panzergrenadier Brigade 37 (Panzergrenadierbrigade 37), in Frankenberg
  - Staff and Support Company Panzergrenadier Brigade 37 (Stabs- und Unterstützungskompanie Panzergrenadierbrigade 37), in Frankenberg
  - Reconnaissance Battalion 13 (Aufklärungsbataillon 13), in Gotha with Fennek reconnaissance vehicles and KZO drones
  - Panzergrenadier Battalion 212 (Panzergrenadierbataillon 212), in Augustdorf with 44x Puma infantry fighting vehicles
  - Panzergrenadier Battalion 371 (Panzergrenadierbataillon 371), in Marienberg with 44x Marder infantry fighting vehicles
  - Panzergrenadier Battalion 391 (Panzergrenadierbataillon 391), in Bad Salzungen with 44x Marder infantry fighting vehicles
  - Panzer Battalion 393 (Panzerbataillon 393), in Bad Frankenhausen with 44x Leopard 2A6 main battle tanks
  - Panzergrenadier Battalion 909 (Panzergrenadierbataillon 909), in Marienberg (Reserve unit)
  - Panzer Artillery Battalion 375 (Panzerartilleriebataillon 375), in Weiden in der Oberpfalz
  - Panzer Engineer Battalion 701 (Panzerpionierbataillon 701), in Gera
  - Supply Battalion 131 (Versorgungsbataillon 131), in Bad Frankenhausen
  - Signal Company Panzergrenadier Brigade 37 (Fernmeldekompanie Panzergrenadierbrigade 37), in Frankenberg

==== Panzer Brigade 45 ====
- Panzer Brigade 45 (Panzerbrigade 45), in Rūdninkai and Rukla (Lithuania) (Activated on 1 April 2025)
  - Staff and Support Company Panzer Brigade 45 (Stabs- und Unterstützungskompanie Panzerbrigade 45), in Nemenčinė
  - Panzergrenadier Battalion 122 (Panzergrenadierbataillon 122), in Oberviechtach with 44x Puma Infantry fighting vehicles — will move to Lithuania in 2026
  - Panzer Battalion 203 (Panzerbataillon 203), in Augustdorf with 44x Leopard 2A7 main battle tanks — will move to Lithuania in 2026
  - Multinational Battle Group Lithuania, in Rukla
  - Panzer Artillery Battalion 455 (Panzerartilleriebataillon 455; formed 19 November 2026, will move to Lithuania before the second half of 2027)
  - Supply Battalion 456 (Versorgungsbataillon 456; formed 19 November 2026, will move to Lithuania before the second half of 2027)
  - Reconnaissance Company 450 (Aufklärungskompanie 450; formed 19 November 2026, will move to Lithuania before the second half of 2027)
  - Panzer Engineer Company 450 (Panzerpionierkompanie 450; formed 19 November 2026, will move to Lithuania before the second half of 2027)
  - Signal Company Panzer Brigade 45 (Fernmeldekompanie Panzerbrigade 45), in Rokantiškės

==== Franco-German Brigade ====
The division also has administrative control of the German units in the Franco-German Brigade:

- Franco-German Brigade (Deutsch-Französische Brigade), in Müllheim
  - Jäger Battalion 291 (Jägerbataillon 291), in Illkirch-Graffenstaden (FR)
  - Jäger Battalion 292 (Jägerbataillon 292), in Donaueschingen
  - Artillery Battalion 295 (Artilleriebataillon 295), in Stetten am kalten Markt with 16x PzH 2000 155mm self-propelled howitzers, 8x M270 MLRS multiple rocket launch systems, KZO drones and 2x Euro-Art COBRA counter-battery radars
  - German-French Supply Battalion (Deutsch-Französisches Versorgungsbataillon), in Müllheim
  - Panzer Engineer Company 550 (Panzerpionierkompanie 550), in Stetten am kalten Markt

=== Rapid Forces Division ===
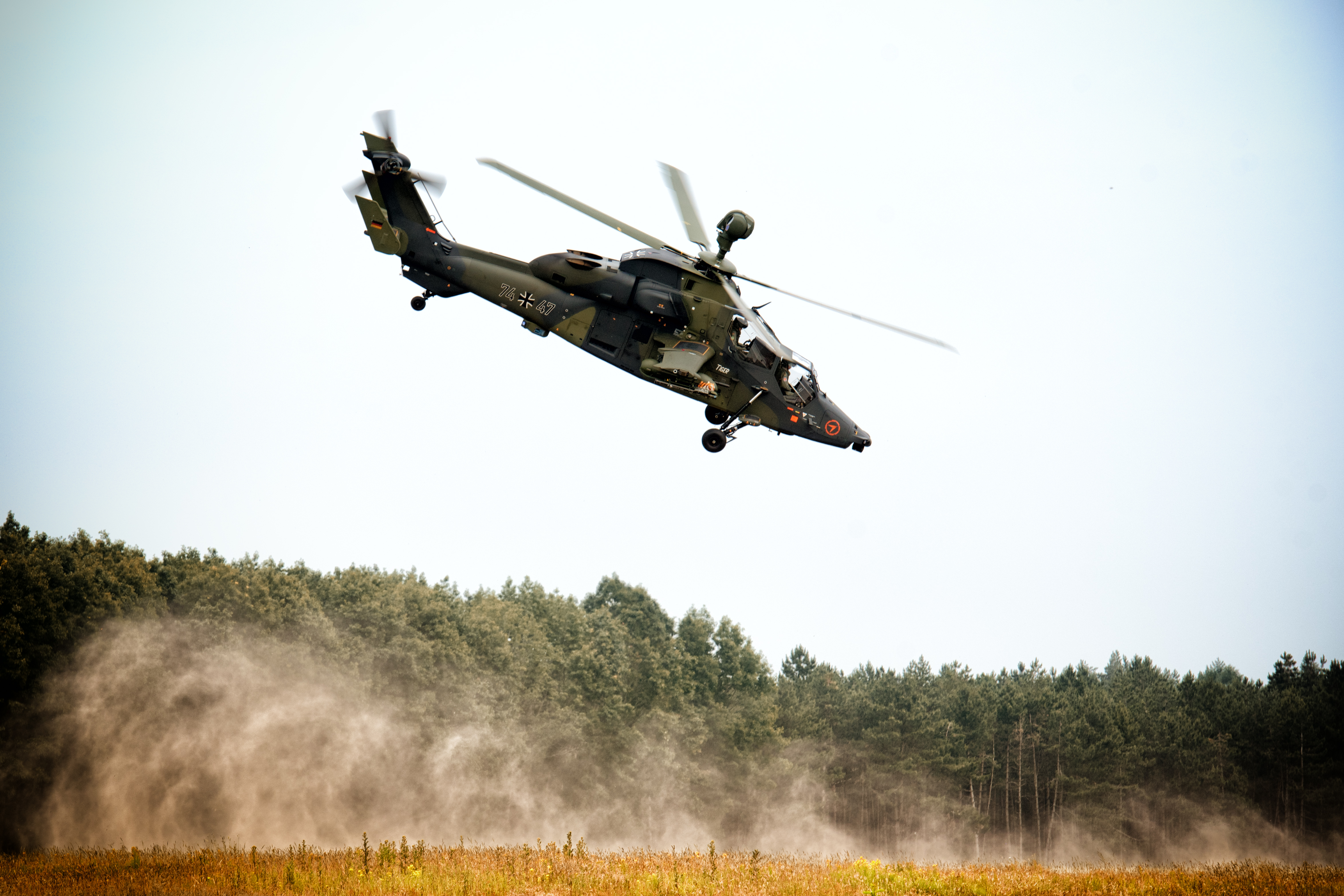
Attack Helicopter Regiment 36 Tiger attack helicopter

- Rapid Forces Division (Division Schnelle Kräfte), in Stadtallendorf
  - Staff and Signal Company, Rapid Forces Division (Stabs- und Fernmeldekompanie Division Schnelle Kräfte), in Stadtallendorf
  - Staff and Command Support Company, Special Operations Component Command (Stabs- und Führungsunterstützungskompanie Special Operations Component Command (SOCC)), in Hardheim
  - Long Range Reconnaissance Company 1 (Fernspähkompanie 1), in Schwarzenborn
  - Rescue Coordination Center (Search and Rescue-Leitstelle (Land)), in Münster

Note: The Rapid Forces Division also has the Royal Netherlands Army's 11th Airmobile Brigade under its command.

==== Airborne Brigade 1 ====
- Airborne Brigade 1 (Luftlandebrigade 1), in Saarlouis
  - Staff and Signal Company Airborne Brigade 1 (Stabs- und Fernmeldekompanie Luftlandebrigade 1), in Saarlouis
  - Fallschirmjäger Regiment 26 (Fallschirmjägerregiment 26), in Zweibrücken
    - 1x Staff, 2x Paratroopers-Commando, 3x Paratroopers, 1x Fire Support, 1x Supply, 1x Medical, 1x Reserve, and 1x Training Company
  - Fallschirmjäger Regiment 31 (Fallschirmjägerregiment 31), in Seedorf
    - 1x Staff, 2x Paratroopers-Commando, 3x Paratroopers, 1x Fire Support, 1x Supply, 1x Medical, 1x Reserve, and 1x Training Company
  - Airborne Reconnaissance Company 260 (Luftlandeaufklärungskompanie 260), in Lebach
  - Airborne Reconnaissance Company 310 (Luftlandeaufklärungskompanie 310), in Seedorf
  - Airborne Engineer Company 260 (Luftlandepionierkompanie 260), in Saarlouis
  - Airborne Engineer Company 270 (Luftlandepionierkompanie 270), in Seedorf

==== Gebirgsjäger Brigade 23 ====
- Gebirgsjäger Brigade 23 (Gebirgsjägerbrigade 23), in Bad Reichenhall
  - Staff and Signal Company Gebirgsjäger Brigade 23 (Stabs- und Fernmeldekompanie Gebirgsjägerbrigade 23), in Bad Reichenhall
  - Mountain Pack Animal Operations and Training Center 230 (Einsatz- und Ausbildungszentrum für Gebirgstragtierwesen 230), in Bad Reichenhall
  - Gebirgsjäger Battalion 231 (Gebirgsjägerbataillon 231), in Bad Reichenhall with Bv206S
  - Gebirgsjäger Battalion 232 (Gebirgsjägerbataillon 232), in Bischofswiesen with Bv206S
  - Gebirgsjäger Battalion 233 (Gebirgsjägerbataillon 233), in Mittenwald with Bv206S
  - Mountain Reconnaissance Company 23 (Gebirgsaufklärungskompanie 23), in Füssen
  - Mountain Engineer Company 23 (Gebirgspionierkompanie 23), in Ingolstadt
  - Mountain Supply Company 23 (Gebirgsversorgungskompanie 23), in Bad Reichenhall and Mittenwald

==== Special Forces Command ====
- Special Forces Command (Kommando Spezialkräfte) (KSK), in Calw
  - 1× Staff, 1× Special Reconnaissance, 1× Special Commando, 3× Commando, 1× Signal, 1× Support, and 1× Supply company; a Medical Center, a Training Department, and a Development Department

==== Helicopter Command ====
- Helicopter Command (Kommando Hubschrauber), in Bückeburg
  - Transport Helicopter Regiment 10 (Transporthubschrauberregiment 10), in Faßberg with 40x NH90 transport helicopters
  - Transport Helicopter Regiment 30 (Transporthubschrauberregiment 30), in Niederstetten with 40x NH90 transport helicopters
  - Attack Helicopter Regiment 36 (Kampfhubschrauberregiment 36), at Fritzlar Air Base with 40x Eurocopter Tiger attack helicopters
  - International Helicopter Training Center (Internationales Hubschrauberausbildungszentrum), in Bückeburg
  - Army Helicopter Maintenance Center (Systemzentrum Drehflügler Heer), in Donauwörth

=== Home Defence Division ===
- Homeland Defence Division (Heimatschutzdivision), in Berlin

==== Home Defence Regiment 1 ====
- Home Defence Regiment 1 (Heimatschutzregiment 1), in Roth
  - Staff and Supply Company 1, Home Defence Regiment 1 (Stabs- und Versorgungskompanie 1, Heimatschutzregiment 1), in Roth
  - Support Company 2, Home Defence Regiment 1 (Unterstützungskompanie 2, Heimatschutzregiment 1), in Roth
  - Training Company 3, Home Defence Regiment 1 (Ausbildungskompanie 3, Heimatschutzregiment 1), in Roth
  - Home Defence Company 4 "Unterfranken", Home Defence Regiment 1 (Heimatschutzkompanie 4 "Unterfranken", Heimatschutzregiment 1), in Volkach
  - Home Defence Company 5 "Mittelfranken", Home Defence Regiment 1 (Heimatschutzkompanie 5 "Mittelfranken", Heimatschutzregiment 1), in Nuremberg
  - Home Defence Company 6 "Oberfranken", Home Defence Regiment 1 (Heimatschutzkompanie 6 "Oberfranken", Heimatschutzregiment 1), in Hof
  - Home Defence Company 7 "Niederbayern", Home Defence Regiment 1 (Heimatschutzkompanie 7 "Niederbayern", Heimatschutzregiment 1), in Bogen
  - Home Defence Company 8 "Oberpfalz", Home Defence Regiment 1 (Heimatschutzkompanie 8 "Oberpfalz", Heimatschutzregiment 1), in Kümmersbruck
  - Home Defence Company 9 "Schwaben", Home Defence Regiment 1 (Heimatschutzkompanie 9 "Schwaben", Heimatschutzregiment 1), in Dillingen an der Donau
  - Home Defence Company 10 "Oberbayern", Home Defence Regiment 1 (Heimatschutzkompanie 10 "Oberbayern", Heimatschutzregiment 1), in Murnau am Staffelsee
  - Home Defence Company 11 "Donau-Pfalz", Home Defence Regiment 1 (Heimatschutzkompanie 11 "Donau-Pfalz", Heimatschutzregiment 1), in Münchsmünster
  - Home Defence Company 12 "Odenwald", Home Defence Regiment 1 (Heimatschutzkompanie 12 "Odenwald", Heimatschutzregiment 1), in Walldürn
  - Home Defence Company 13 "Oberrhein", Home Defence Regiment 1 (Heimatschutzkompanie 13 "Oberrhein", Heimatschutzregiment 1), in Bruchsal
  - Home Defence Company 14 "Schwäbische Alb", Home Defence Regiment 1 (Heimatschutzkompanie 14 "Schwäbische Alb", Heimatschutzregiment 1), in Stetten am kalten Markt
  - Home Defence Company 15 "Linzgau", Home Defence Regiment 1 (Heimatschutzkompanie 15 "Linzgau", Heimatschutzregiment 1), in Pfullendorf

==== Home Defence Regiment 2 ====
- Home Defence Regiment 2 (Heimatschutzregiment 2), in Münster
  - Staff and Supply Company 1, Home Defence Regiment 2 (Stabs- und Versorgungskompanie 1, Heimatschutzregiment 2), in Münster
  - Support Company 2, Home Defence Regiment 2 (Unterstützungskompanie 2, Heimatschutzregiment 2), in Münster
  - Training Company 3, Home Defence Regiment 2 (Ausbildungskompanie 3, Heimatschutzregiment 2), in Münster
  - Home Defence Company 4 "Rheinland", Home Defence Regiment 2 (Heimatschutzkompanie 4 "Rheinland", Heimatschutzregiment 2), in Düsseldorf
  - Home Defence Company 5 "Ruhrgebiet", Home Defence Regiment 2 (Heimatschutzkompanie 5 "Ruhrgebiet", Heimatschutzregiment 2), in Unna
  - Home Defence Company 6 "Westfalen", Home Defence Regiment 2 (Heimatschutzkompanie 6 "Westfalen", Heimatschutzregiment 2), in Münster
  - Home Defence Company 7 "Saarland", Home Defence Regiment 2 (Heimatschutzkompanie 7 "Saarland", Heimatschutzregiment 2), in Saarlouis
  - Home Defence Company 8 "Hunsrück", Home Defence Regiment 2 (Heimatschutzkompanie 8 "Hunsrück", Heimatschutzregiment 2), in Baumholder
  - Home Defence Company 9 "Kurpfalz", Home Defence Regiment 2 (Heimatschutzkompanie 9 "Kurpfalz", Heimatschutzregiment 2), in Germersheim
  - Home Defence Company 10 "Rheinland Pfalz", Home Defence Regiment 2 (Heimatschutzkompanie 10 "Rheinland Pfalz", Heimatschutzregiment 2), in Mainz

==== Home Defence Regiment 3 ====
- Home Defence Regiment 3 (Heimatschutzregiment 3), in Nienburg
  - Staff and Supply Company 1, Home Defence Regiment 3 (Stabs- und Versorgungskompanie 1, Heimatschutzregiment 3), in Nienburg
  - Support Company 2, Home Defence Regiment 3 (Unterstützungskompanie 2, Heimatschutzregiment 3), in Nienburg
  - Training Company 3, Home Defence Regiment 3 (Ausbildungskompanie 3, Heimatschutzregiment 3), in Nienburg
  - Home Defence Company 4 "Solling", Home Defence Regiment 3 (Heimatschutzkompanie 4 "Solling", Heimatschutzregiment 3), in Holzminden
  - Home Defence Company 5 "Nordheide", Home Defence Regiment 3 (Heimatschutzkompanie 5 "Nordheide", Heimatschutzregiment 3), in Lüneburg
  - Home Defence Company 6 "Küste", Home Defence Regiment 3 (Heimatschutzkompanie 6 "Küste", Heimatschutzregiment 3), in Wittmund
  - Home Defence Company 7 "Hannover", Home Defence Regiment 3 (Heimatschutzkompanie 7 "Hannover", Heimatschutzregiment 3), in Hanover
  - Home Defence Company 8 "Bremen I", Home Defence Regiment 3 (Heimatschutzkompanie 8 "Bremen I", Heimatschutzregiment 3), in Bremen
  - Home Defence Company 9 "Bremen II", Home Defence Regiment 3 (Heimatschutzkompanie 9 "Bremen II", Heimatschutzregiment 3), in Bremerhaven

==== Home Defence Regiment 4 ====
- Home Defence Regiment 4 (Heimatschutzregiment 4), in Alt Duvenstedt
  - Staff and Supply Company 1, Home Defence Regiment 4 (Stabs- und Versorgungskompanie 1, Heimatschutzregiment 4), in Alt Duvenstedt
  - Support Company 2, Home Defence Regiment 4 (Unterstützungskompanie 2, Heimatschutzregiment 4), in Alt Duvenstedt
  - Training Company 3, Home Defence Regiment 4 (Ausbildungskompanie 3, Heimatschutzregiment 4), in Alt Duvenstedt
  - Home Defence Company 4 "Ostsee", Home Defence Regiment 4 (Heimatschutzkompanie 4 "Ostsee", Heimatschutzregiment 4), in Parow
  - Home Defence Company 5 "Mecklenburg", Home Defence Regiment 4 (Heimatschutzkompanie 5 "Mecklenburg", Heimatschutzregiment 4), in Schwerin
  - Home Defence Company 6 "Vorpommern", Home Defence Regiment 4 (Heimatschutzkompanie 6 "Vorpommern", Heimatschutzregiment 4), in Neubrandenburg
  - Home Defence Company 7 "Hamburg", Home Defence Regiment 4 (Heimatschutzkompanie 7 "Hamburg", Heimatschutzregiment 4), in Hamburg
  - Home Defence Company 8 "Schleswig", Home Defence Regiment 4 (Heimatschutzkompanie 8 "Schleswig", Heimatschutzregiment 4), in Husum
  - Home Defence Company 9 "Holstein", Home Defence Regiment 4 (Heimatschutzkompanie 9 "Holstein", Heimatschutzregiment 4), in Eutin

==== Home Defence Regiment 5 ====
- Home Defence Regiment 5 (Heimatschutzregiment 5), in Ohrdruf
  - Staff and Supply Company 1, Home Defence Regiment 5 (Stabs- und Versorgungskompanie 1, Heimatschutzregiment 5), in Ohrdruf
  - Support Company 2, Home Defence Regiment 5 (Unterstützungskompanie 2, Heimatschutzregiment 5), in Ohrdruf
  - Training Company 3, Home Defence Regiment 5 (Ausbildungskompanie 3, Heimatschutzregiment 5), in Ohrdruf
  - Home Defence Company 4 "Nordhessen", Home Defence Regiment 5 (Heimatschutzkompanie 4 "Nordhessen", Heimatschutzregiment 5), in Frankenberg
  - Home Defence Company 5 "Mittelhessen", Home Defence Regiment 5 (Heimatschutzkompanie 5 "Mittelhessen", Heimatschutzregiment 5), in Wiesbaden
  - Home Defence Company 6 "Südhessen", Home Defence Regiment 5 (Heimatschutzkompanie 6 "Südhessen", Heimatschutzregiment 5), in Wiesbaden
  - Home Defence Company 7 "Thüringen", Home Defence Regiment 5 (Heimatschutzkompanie 7 "Thüringen", Heimatschutzregiment 5), in Erfurt
  - Home Defence Company 8 "Sachsen", Home Defence Regiment 5 (Heimatschutzkompanie 8 "Sachsen", Heimatschutzregiment 5), in Dresden

==== Home Defence Regiment 6 ====
- Home Defence Regiment 6 (Heimatschutzregiment 6), in Möckern (activated 1 October 2025)
  - Staff and Supply Company 1, Home Defence Regiment 6 (Stabs- und Versorgungskompanie 1, Heimatschutzregiment 6), in Möckern
  - Support Company 2, Home Defence Regiment 6 (Unterstützungskompanie 2, Heimatschutzregiment 6), in Möckern
  - Training Company 3, Home Defence Regiment 6 (Ausbildungskompanie 3, Heimatschutzregiment 6), in Möckern
  - Home Defence Company 4 "Berlin I", Home Defence Regiment 6 (Heimatschutzkompanie 4 "Berlin I", Heimatschutzregiment 6), in Berlin
  - Home Defence Company 5 "Berlin II", Home Defence Regiment 6 (Heimatschutzkompanie 5 "Berlin II", Heimatschutzregiment 6), in Berlin
  - Home Defence Company 6 "Brandenburg I", Home Defence Regiment 6 (Heimatschutzkompanie 6 "Brandenburg I", Heimatschutzregiment 6), in Potsdam
  - Home Defence Company 7 "Brandenburg II", Home Defence Regiment 6 (Heimatschutzkompanie 7 "Brandenburg II", Heimatschutzregiment 6), in Potsdam
  - Home Defence Company 8 "Sachsen-Anhalt I", Home Defence Regiment 6 (Heimatschutzkompanie 8 "Sachsen-Anhalt I", Heimatschutzregiment 6), in Magdeburg
  - Home Defence Company 9 "Sachsen-Anhalt II", Home Defence Regiment 6 (Heimatschutzkompanie 9 "Sachsen-Anhalt II", Heimatschutzregiment 6), in Klietz

=== Other units ===
As part of the Multinational Corps Northeast:

- Multinational Corps Northeast, in Szczecin, Poland
  - Signal Battalion 610 (Fernmeldebataillon 610), in Prenzlau (Under administrative control of the 1st Panzerdivision)

As part of the Royal Netherlands Army's 43rd Mechanized Brigade:

- 43rd Mechanized Brigade (43 Gemechaniseerde Brigade), in Havelte
  - Panzer Battalion 414 (Panzerbataillon 414), in Bergen

=== Training Command ===
- Training Command (Ausbildungskommando), in Leipzig
  - Army Officer School (Offizierschule des Heeres), in Dresden
    - Army Tactics Center (Taktikzentrum des Heeres), Dresden
  - Army Non-commissioned Officer School (Unteroffizierschule des Heeres, in Delitzsch
  - Infantry School (Infanterieschule), in Hammelburg
    - Mountain and Winter Combat School (Gebirgs- und Winterkampfschule), in Mittenwald
    - Airborne/ Air Transport School (Luftlande-/Lufttransportschule), in Altenstadt
    - Army Special Forces Training Base (Ausbildungsstützpunkt Spezialkräfte Heer), in Calw
  - Armored Troops School (Panzertruppenschule), in Munster
    - Army Reconnaissance School (Heeresaufklärungsschule), in Munster
    - Armored Combat Troops School (Schule Gepanzerte Kampftruppen), in Munster
    - Artillery School (Artillerieschule), in Idar-Oberstein
  - Engineer School (Pionierschule), in Ingolstadt
    - Explosive Ordnance Disposal School (Kampfmittelabwehrschule), in Stetten am kalten Markt
  - Army Technical School (Technische Schule des Heeres), in Aachen
  - Special Operations Training Center (Ausbildungszentrum Spezielle Operationen), in Pfullendorf
  - Air Mobility Training and Exercise Center (Ausbildungs- und Übungszentrum Luftbeweglichkeit), in Celle
  - Army Combat Simulation Center (Gefechtssimulationszentrum Heer), in Wildflecken
  - Army Combat Training Center (Gefechtsübungszentrum Heer), in Letzlingen
  - Bundeswehr United Nations Training Center (Vereinte Nationen Ausbildungszentrum Bundeswehr), in Hammelburg

== Geographic distribution ==
German Army locations 2025:
Units: Panzer Panzergrenadier Jäger Gebirgsjäger Fallschirmjäger Special Forces
Reconnaissance Artillery Engineers Army Aviation Logistics Signals Air Defense
Reserve formations are in Italics
#1 Munster: Panzergrenadier Lehr Battalion 92, Panzer Lehr Battalion 93, Artillery Lehr Battalion 325
#2 Augustdorf: Panzer Battalion 203, Panzergrenadier Battalion 212, Artillery Battalion 215
#3 Schwarzenborn: Jäger Battalion 1, Jäger Battalion 921, Long Range Reconnaissance Company 1
#4 Ingolstadt: Panzer Engineer Battalion 8, Engineer Battalion 905, Mountain Engineer Company 23
#5 Füssen: Reconnaissance Battalion 10, Supply Battalion 8, Mountain Reconnaissance Company 23
#6 Bad Reichenhall: Mountain Pack Animal Operations & Training Center 230, Gebirgsjäger Battalion 231, Mountain Supply Company 23

== Cyber and Information Domain Command ==
Signals, Psychological Operations, Strategic Reconnaissance (incl. SIGINT), Geographic Information (incl. military satellites), and Electronic Warfare units of the German Armed Forces fall under the Cyber and Information Domain Command (Kommando Cyber- und Informationsraum) of the Bundeswehr. Therefore, the German Army does not have its own units of such type, but is supported by the units of the Cyber and Information Space Command as needed.

== Joint Support Service ==
Logistics, CBRN defense and Military Police units of the German Armed Forces fall under the Joint Support Service (Streitkräftebasis) of the Bundeswehr. Therefore, the German Army does not have its own units of such type, but is supported by the units of the Joint Support Service as needed.

== Joint Medical Service ==
All medical units of the German Armed Forces fall under the Joint Medical Service of the Bundeswehr (Zentraler Sanitätsdienst der Bundeswehr). Therefore, the German Army does not have its own medical units, but is supported by the units of the Joint Medical Service as needed.
