= Buchberger Leite =

Coordinates: 48.819213°N 13.509557°E

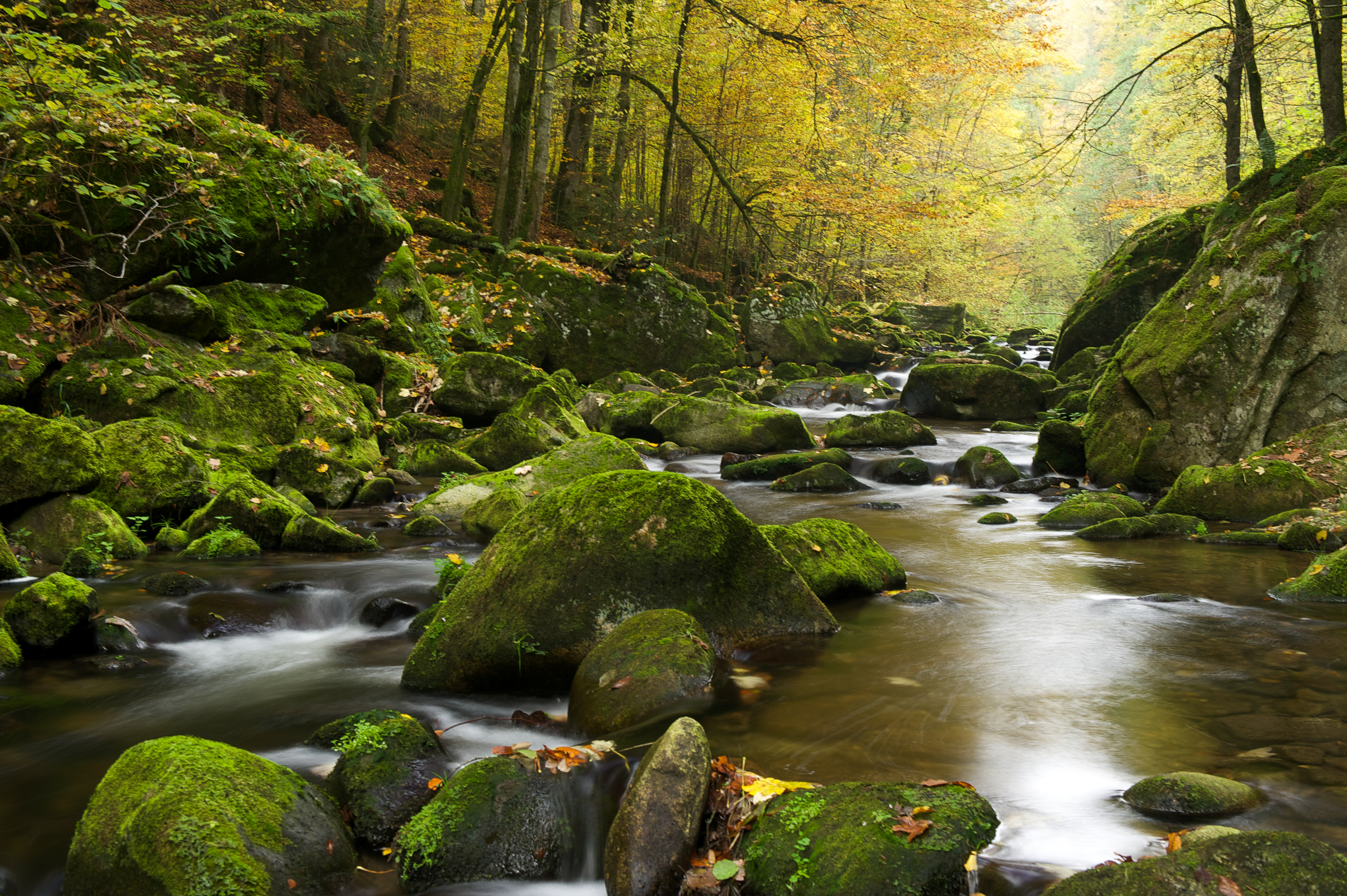
The Buchberger Leite

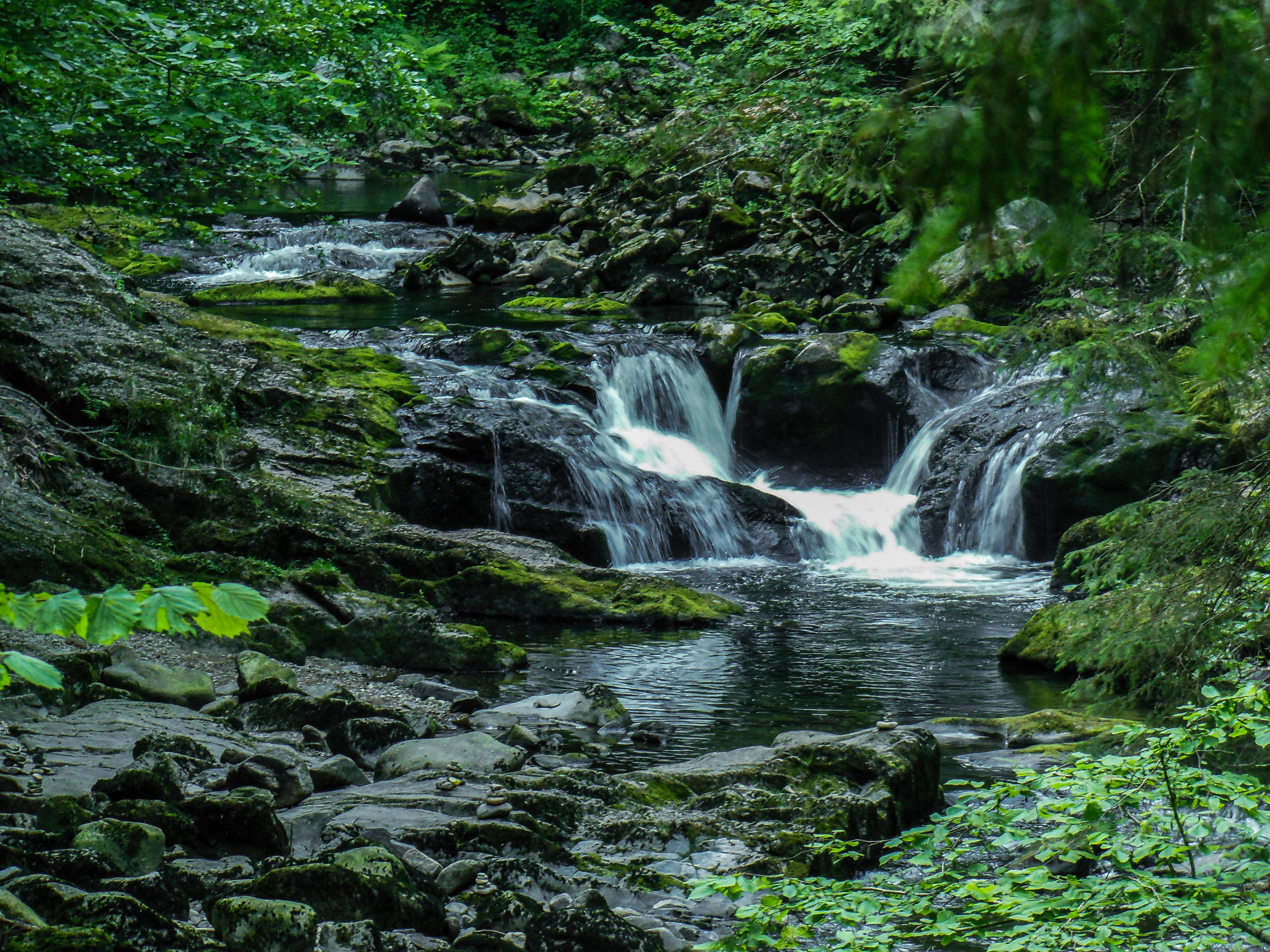
Wilde Wolfsteiner Ohe

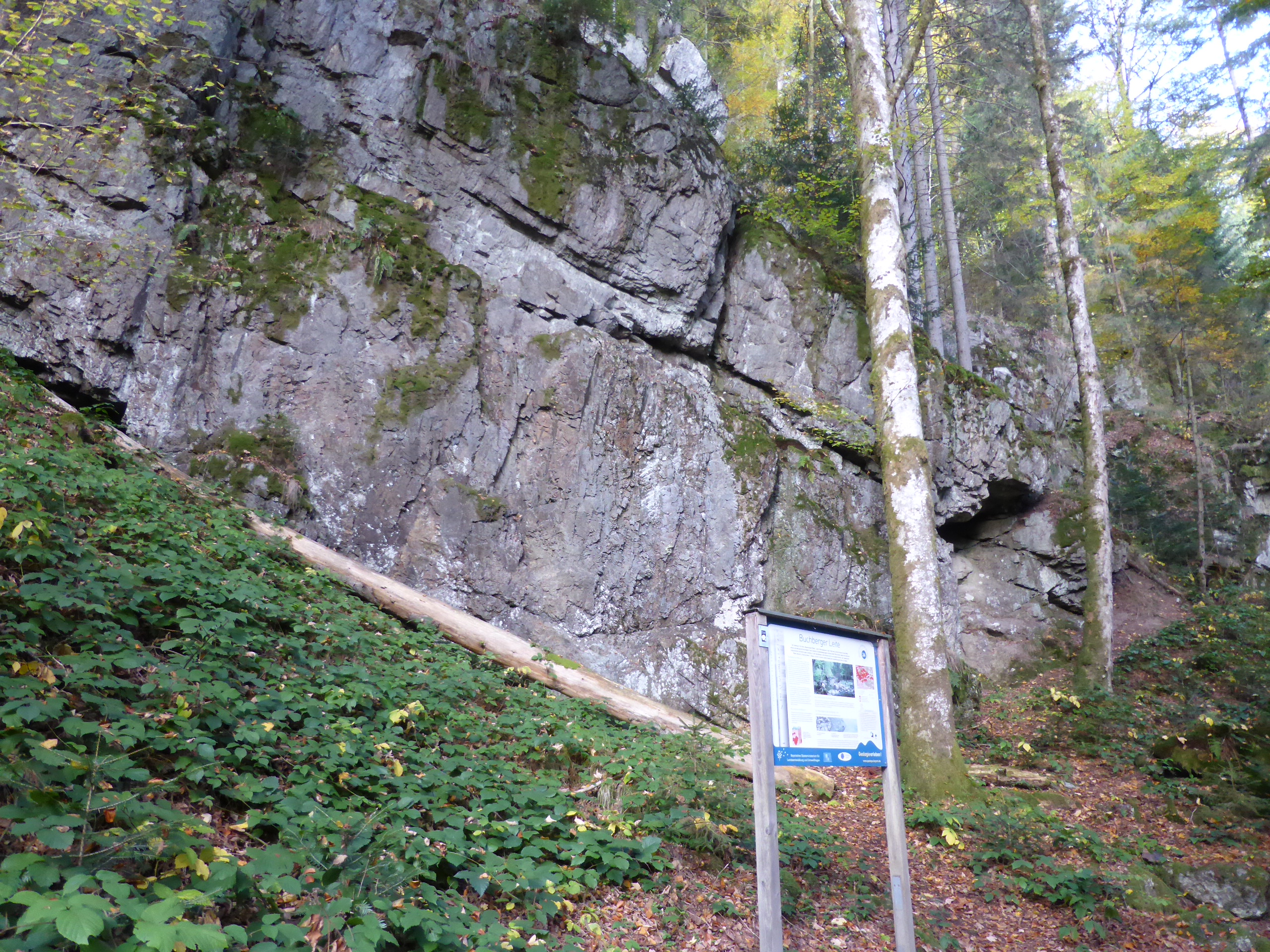
Geotope

The Buchberger Leite is a gorge near Hohenau in the Lower Bavarian county of Freyung-Grafenau in Bavaria.

The gorge runs between Freyung and Ringelai.

As early as 1846 Bernhard Grueber and Adalbert Müller, in their book Der bayrische Wald wrote: "One shouldn't forget to visit the nearby Buchberg from Freyung, where the waters of the Ohe rush wildly through a gorge enclosed by vertical walls".

Here, after breaking through the rock formation of the Pfahl, the Wolfsteiner Ohe river carved up its way to 100 metres deep in the dark Pfahl slate rock of the Buchberger Nebenpfahl. The protected area of Buchberger and Reschbachleite (officially: Schutz des Landschaftsteils Buchberger- und Reschbachleite, im Bereich der Gemeinden Freyung, Hohenau, Kumreut und Wasching, Landkreis Wolfstein) on 14 February 1961 has an area of 184 hectares. The white water gorge was designated in 2003 by the Bavarian Environment Ministry as one of the 100 mos beautiful geotopes in Bavaria. Further south its waters empty into the River Ilz.

At the westernmost of the two entrances into the gorge is the Freyung Carbide Works (Carbidwerk Freyung). In its vicinity lie the few remains of Neuenbuchberg Castle. This had been the seat of the Puchbergs since the 13th century but later went to the bishops of Passau. At the Carbide Works the trail runs through a short tunnel, cutting across a bend in the river.

== Geotope ==
The gorge is designated by the Bavarian State Office of the Environment (LfU) as a geo-scientifically valuable geotope (geotope no.: 272R003). It was assessed by the LfU with the official seal of approval to be included in the list of Bavaria’s most beautiful geotopes.
