= Schwarzbach (Reschbach) =

River in Germany

Location
- Country: Germany
- States: Bavaria

Physical characteristics
- Mouth
  - location: Reschbach
  - coordinates: 48.9323°N 13.5532°E

Basin features
- Progression: Reschbach→ Wolfsteiner Ohe→ Ilz→ Danube→ Black Sea

The Schwarzbach (German pronunciation: [ˈʃvaʁtsˌbax]; or Großer Schwarzbach) is a river of Bavaria, Germany. It is a tributary of the Reschbach north of Mauth.

== See also ==
- List of rivers of Bavaria
