= Kleine Ohe =

Kleine Ohe may refer to:

- Kleine Ohe (Danube), a river of Bavaria, Germany
- Kleine Ohe (Ilz), a river of Bavaria, Germany
