= Sagwasser =

River in Germany

- The Sagwasser in the area of the Sagwasser parking lot in the Bavarian Forest National Park

Location
- Country: Germany
- State: Bavaria

Physical characteristics
- Mouth
  - location: Kleine Ohe
  - coordinates: 48.8671°N 13.4513°E
- Length: 12.7 km (7.9 mi)

Basin features
- Progression: Kleine Ohe→ Ilz→ Danube→ Black Sea

Sagwasser is a river of Bavaria, Germany. It flows into the Kleine Ohe near Neuschönau.

== See also ==
- List of rivers of Bavaria
