= Große Ohe =

River in Germany

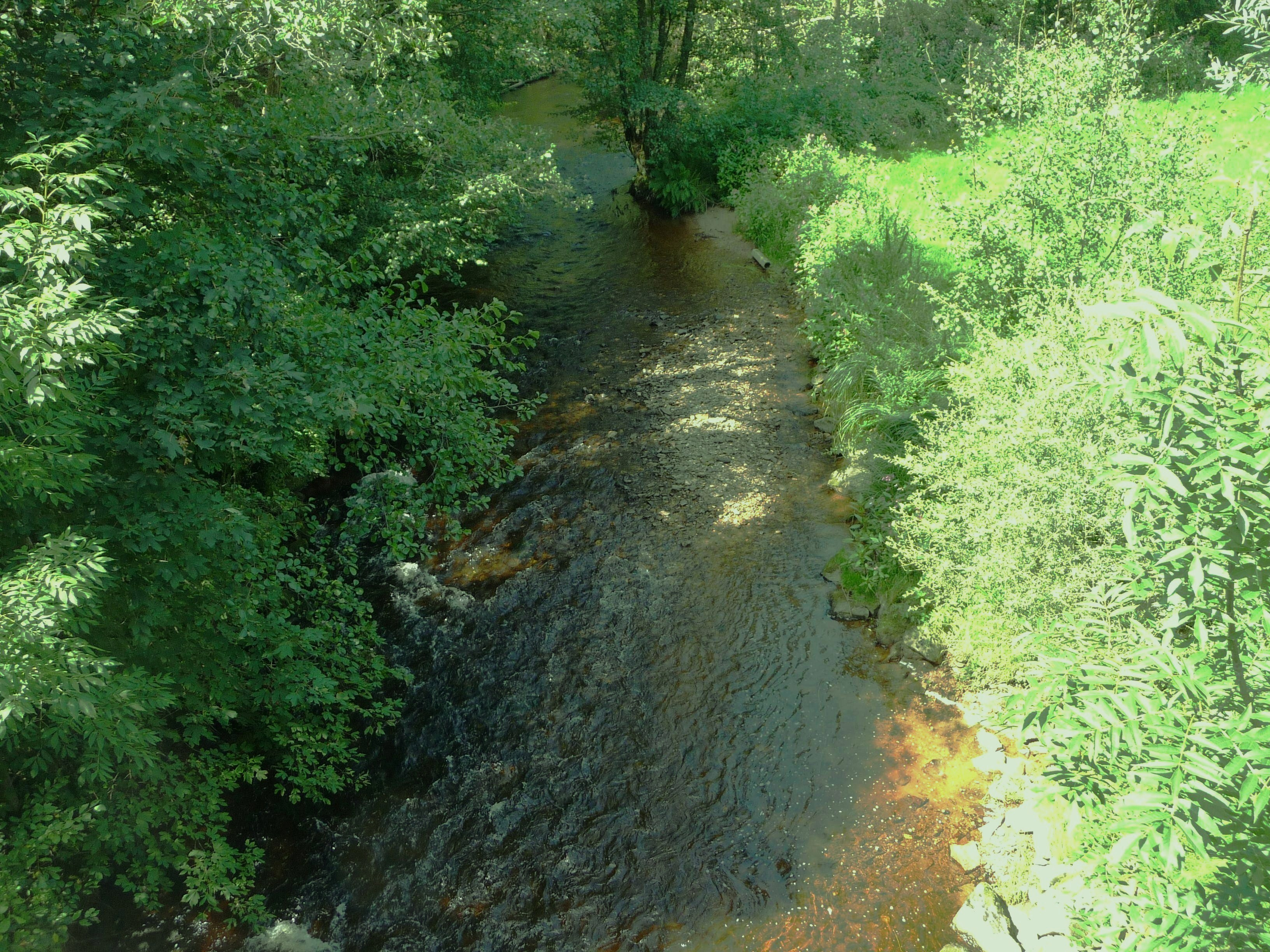
- The Große Ohe shortly before the inflow of the Mitternacher Ohe

Location
- Country: Germany
- State: Bavaria

Physical characteristics
- Mouth
  - location: Ilz
  - coordinates: 48.8178°N 13.3701°E
- Length: 29.1 km (18.1 mi)

Basin features
- Progression: Ilz→ Danube→ Black Sea

Große Ohe (in its upper course: Seebach) is a river of Bavaria, Germany. The length of the Große Ohe is 29 kilometers. At its confluence with the Kleine Ohe in Eberhardsreuth, the Ilz is formed.

== See also ==
- List of rivers of Bavaria
