= Mitternacher Ohe =

River in Germany

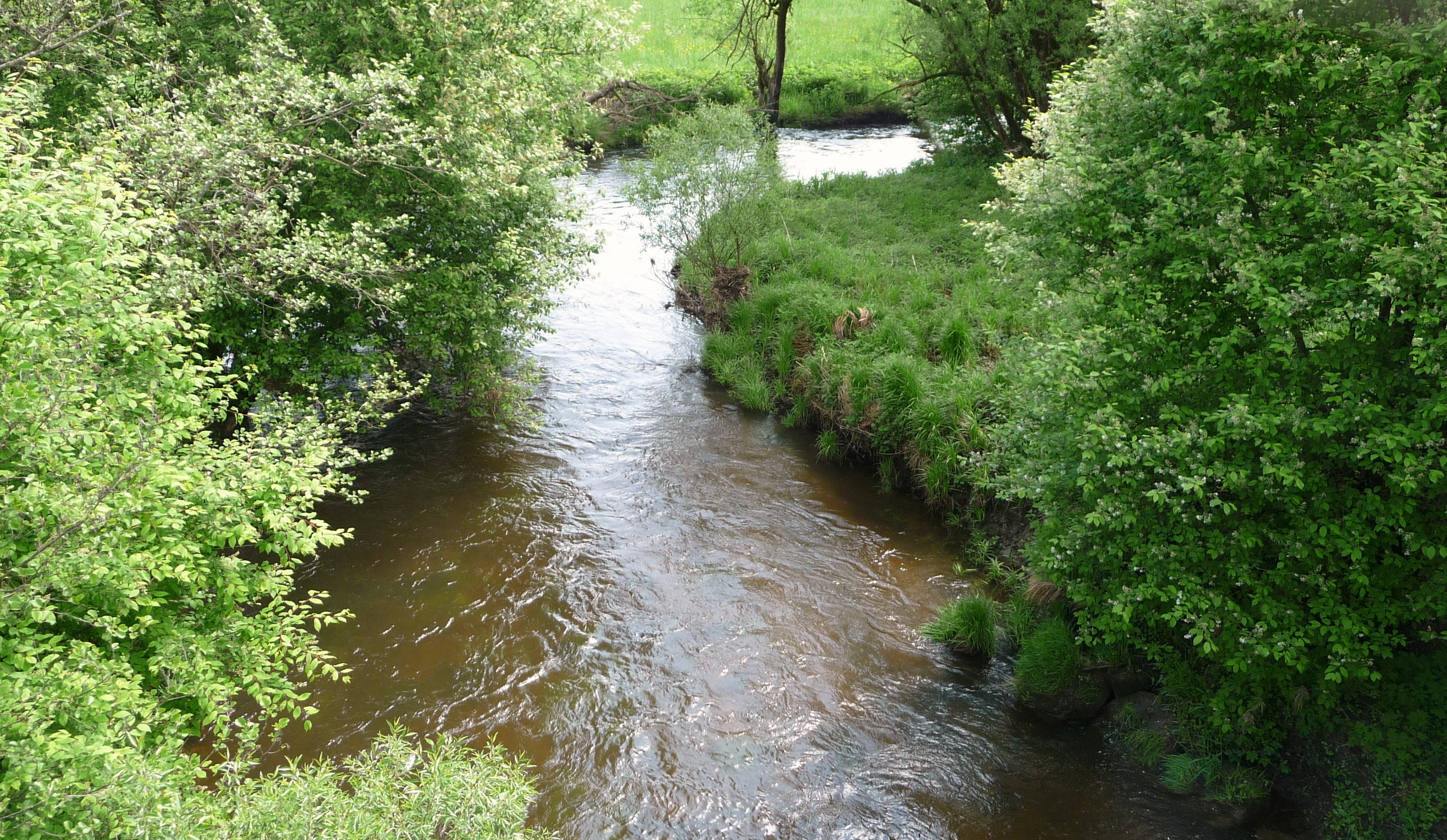
- The Mitternacher Ohe at Eberhardsreuth (part of Schönberg)

Location
- Country: Germany
- State: Bavaria

Physical characteristics
- Mouth
  - location: Große Ohe
  - coordinates: 48.8256°N 13.3603°E
- Length: 23.6 km (14.7 mi)

Basin features
- Progression: Große Ohe→ Ilz→ Danube→ Black Sea

Mitternacher Ohe is a river of Bavaria, Germany. It flows into the Große Ohe near Schönberg.

== See also ==
- List of rivers of Bavaria
