= KZO =

KZO may refer to

- KZO (aircraft) - UAV
- Kyjzylorda Airport - (IATA code), an airport in the Kyzylorda Region of Kazakhstan
- Koninklijke Zwanenberg-Organon, predecessor of Organon International
- KZO (TV channel), an Argentine station
