= Saußbach =

River in Germany

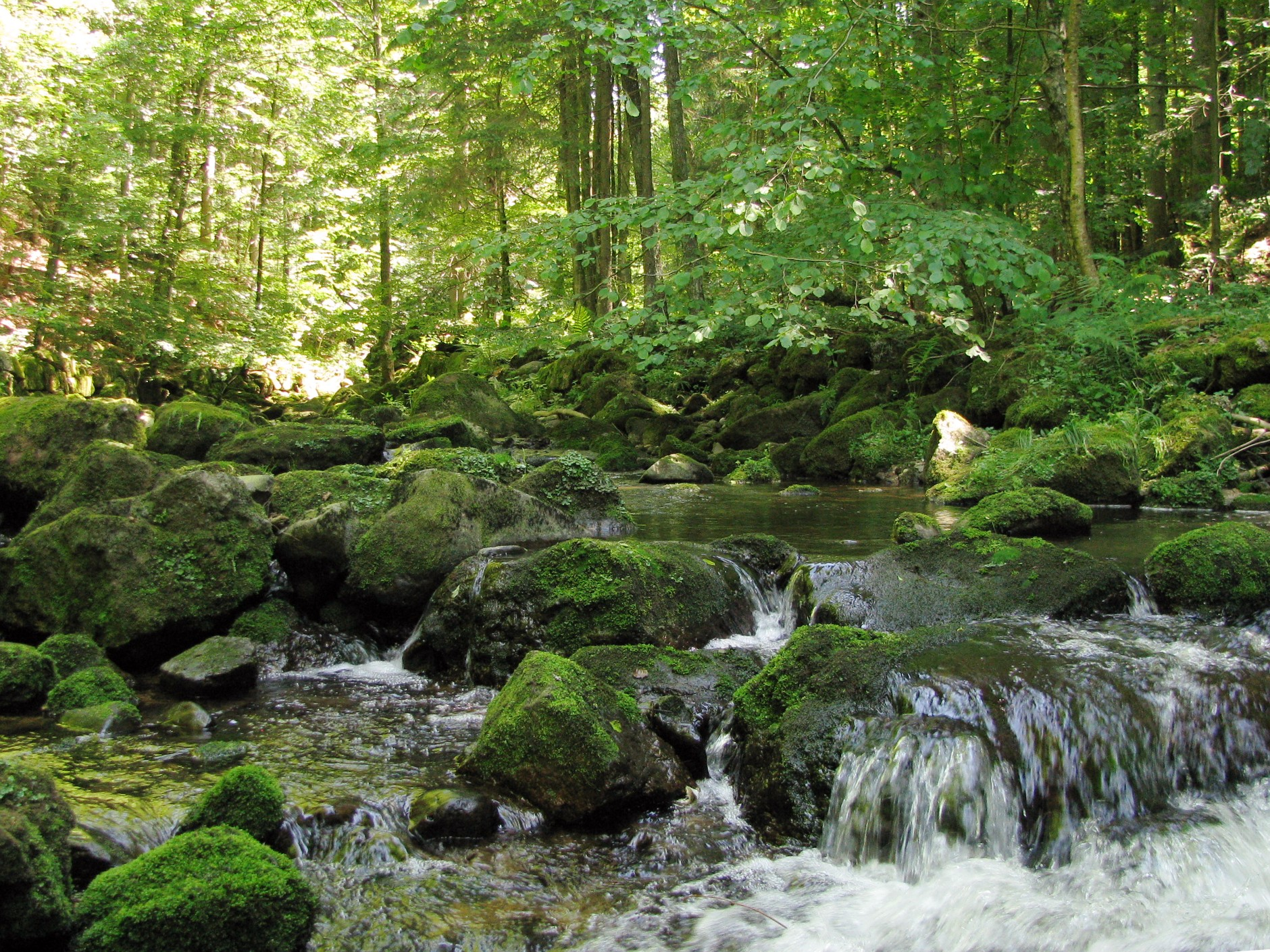

Location
- Country: Germany
- State: Bavaria

Physical characteristics
- Mouth
  - location: Wolfsteiner Ohe
  - coordinates: 48.8192°N 13.5178°E
- Length: 32.1 km (19.9 mi)
- Basin size: 112 km^{2} (43 sq mi)

Basin features
- Progression: Wolfsteiner Ohe→ Ilz→ Danube→ Black Sea

Saußbach (also: Saußwasser and Teufelsbach) is a river of Bavaria, Germany. The uppermost 4.8 km of its course forms part of the border with the Czech Republic. At its confluence with the Reschbach west of Freyung, the Wolfsteiner Ohe is formed.

== See also ==
- List of rivers of Bavaria
