= Reschbach =

River in Germany

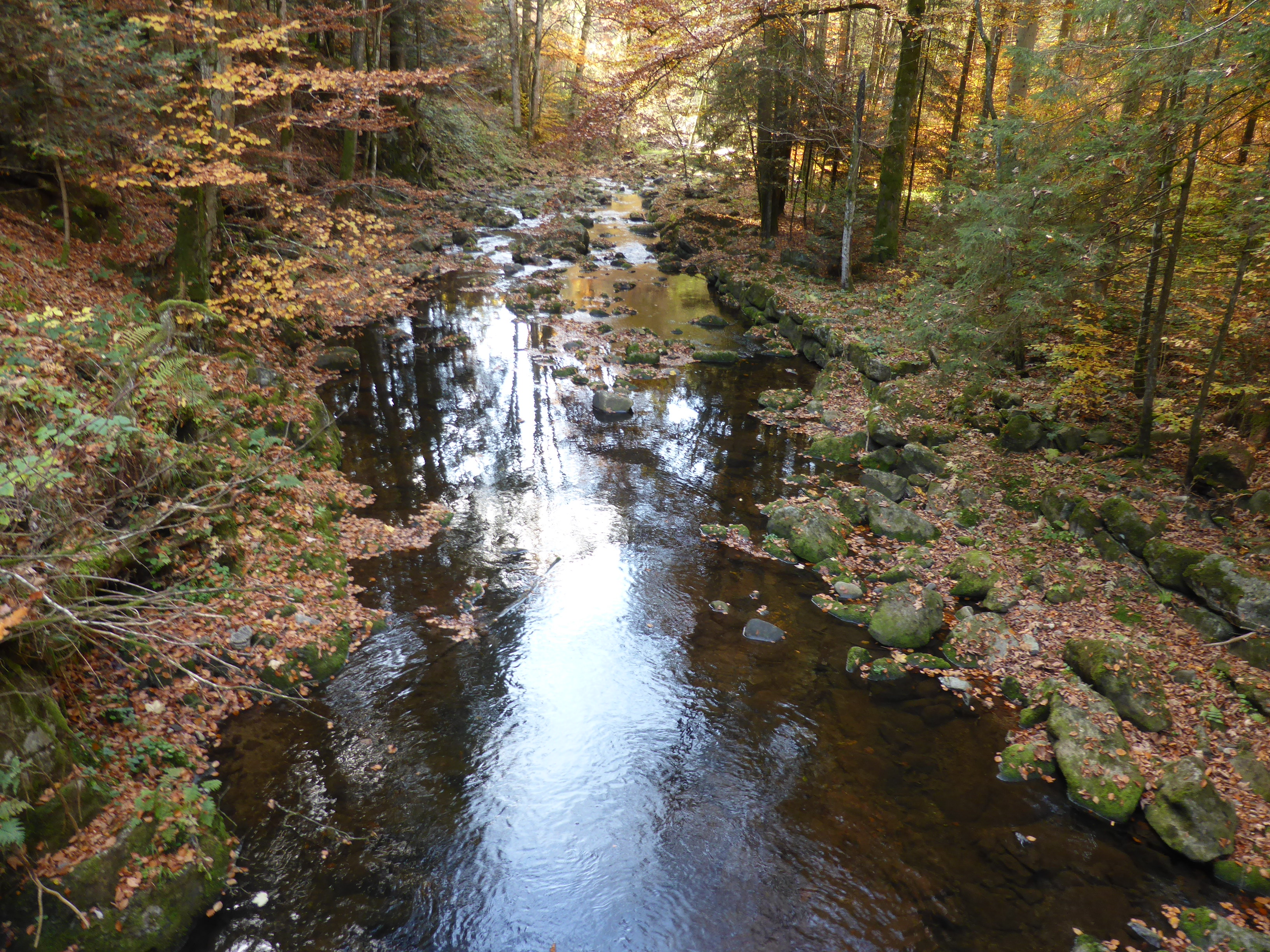
- The Reschbach shortly before its mouth

Location
- Country: Germany
- State: Bavaria

Physical characteristics
- Mouth
  - location: Wolfsteiner Ohe
  - coordinates: 48.8192°N 13.5178°E
- Length: 22.8 km (14.2 mi)

Basin features
- Progression: Wolfsteiner Ohe→ Ilz→ Danube→ Black Sea

Reschbach (also: Reschwasser) is a river of Bavaria, Germany. Its source is on the border with the Czech Republic, close to the source of the Vltava. At its confluence with the Saußbach west of Freyung, the Wolfsteiner Ohe is formed.

== See also ==
- List of rivers of Bavaria
