= Homeland Defence Division =

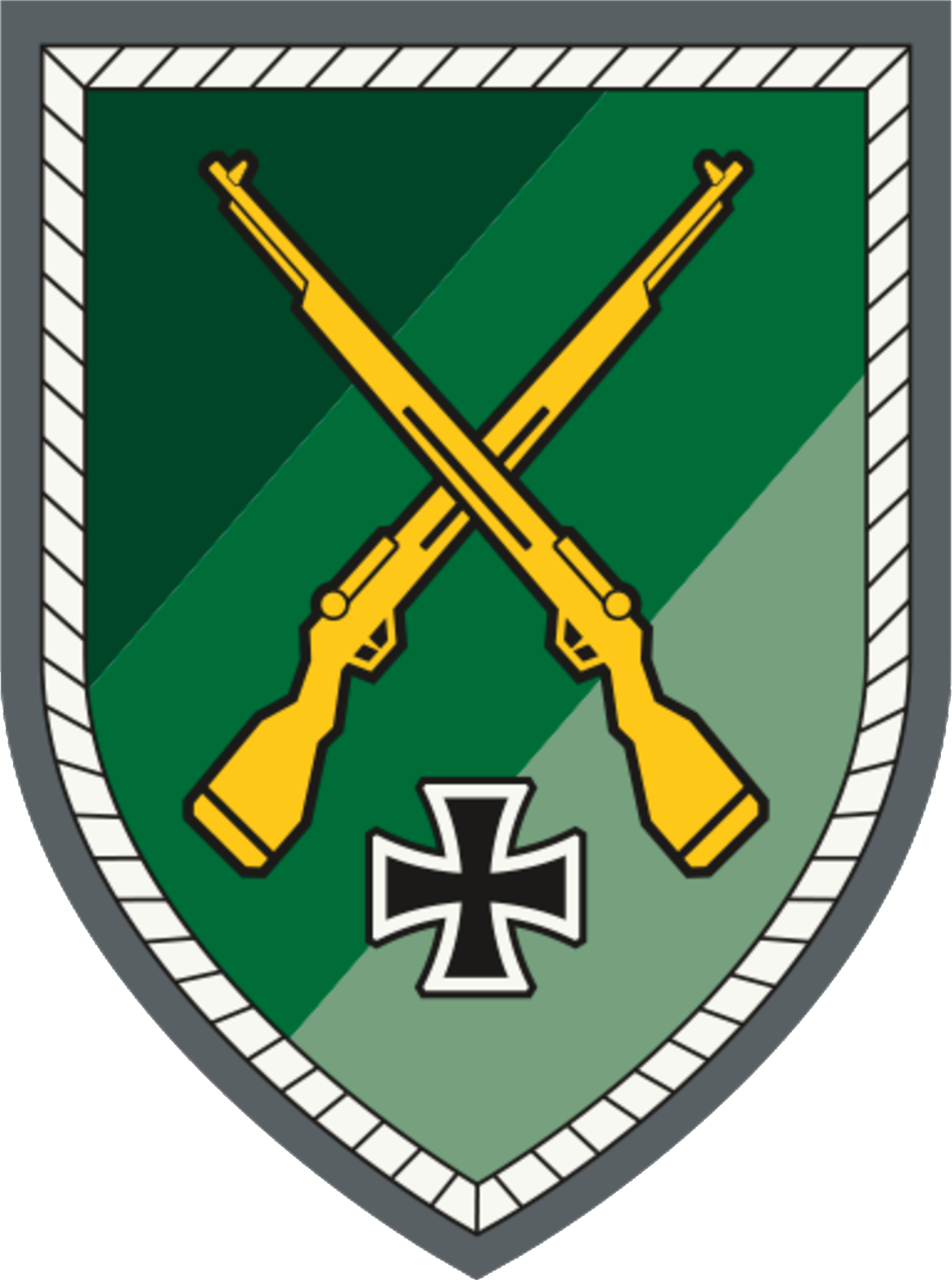
- Divisional insignia
- Active: 14 March 2025–Present
- Country: Germany
- Branch: Army
- Type: Territorial defence
- Role: Domestic security Collective security State of defence
- Size: 6 Regiments (current); 12 Regiments (planned)

Commanders
- Current commander: Major General Andreas Henne

The Homeland Defence Division (German: Heimatschutzdivision; HSchDiv) is a partially active German Army Division of the Bundeswehr, which combines the forces of Heimatschutz (Homeland Defence). It is subordinate to the Army Command.

== Order ==
The mission of the Homeland Defence Division and the Homeland Security Forces is to protect Germany, support civil authorities, and secure critical infrastructure. Unlike the Field Army, the Homeland Security Forces' operational area is exclusively German territory, even in a state of defence.

Other tasks include protection and security tasks as well as property protection within the framework of national defence (Landesverteidigung) and collective defence, Host Nation Support, deployment support for NATO forces, maintenance of domestic security in cooperation with the police and civil protection, and support of civil protection in the event of serious natural disasters or accidents.

Any available reservist can be assigned to the Homeland Defence Forces. This increase in personnel is supported by the training and equipment necessary for deployment, as needed. Regionally assigned units support the Homeland Defence. The organizational structures take into account regional conditions and available personnel potential. They can be flexibly adapted as needed.

== Outline ==
The Homeland Defence Division is directly subordinate to the Army Command. The Homeland Defence Division is divided into six Homeland Defence Regiments. All Homeland Defence companies that were subordinate to the respective state commands (Landeskommando) before the establishment of the Homeland Defence Division were each assigned to a Homeland Defence Regiment.

A homeland defense regiment consists of a staff and supply company (Stabs-/VersKp; 1st Company), a support company (UstgKp; 2nd Company), a training company (AusbKp; 3rd Company) and several homeland defense companies, which additionally have a regional designation (e.g. 14./HSchRgt 1 "Schwäbische Alb").

== Organization ==
=== Future organization ===
- Homeland Defence Regiment 1 (Heimatschutzregiment 1), in Roth
  - Homeland Defence Battalion 111 (Heimatschutzbataillon 111), in Fürstenfeldbruck
  - Homeland Defence Battalion 112 (Heimatschutzbataillon 112), in Sigmaringen
- Homeland Defence Regiment 2 (Heimatschutzregiment 2), in Münster
  - Homeland Defence Battalion 121 (Heimatschutzbataillon 121), in Münster
- Homeland Defence Regiment 3 (Heimatschutzregiment 3), in Nienburg
  - Homeland Defence Battalion 131 (Heimatschutzbataillon 131), in Friedberg
  - Homeland Defence Battalion 132 (Heimatschutzbataillon 132), in Kusel
- Homeland Defence Regiment 4 (Heimatschutzregiment 4), in Alt Duvenstedt
  - Homeland Defence Battalion 141 (Heimatschutzbataillon 141), in Trollenhagen
- Homeland Defence Regiment 5 (Heimatschutzregiment 5), in Ohrdruf
- Homeland Defence Regiment 6 (Heimatschutzregiment 6), in Altengrabow

=== Organization 2026 ===
Regiment	Name	Company	Garrison	State
Homeland Defence Regiment 1	1./Homeland Defence Regiment 1	Staff & Supply Company	Roth	Bavaria
Homeland Defence Regiment 1	2./Homeland Defence Regiment 1	Support Company	Roth	Bavaria
Homeland Defence Regiment 1	3./Homeland Defence Regiment 1	Training Company	Roth	Bavaria
Homeland Defence Regiment 1	4./Homeland Defence Regiment 1	Homeland Defence Company Unterfranken	Volkach	Bavaria
Homeland Defence Regiment 1	5./Homeland Defence Regiment 1	Homeland Defence Company Mittelfranken	Nürnberg	Bavaria
Homeland Defence Regiment 1	6./Homeland Defence Regiment 1	Homeland Defence Company Oberfranken	Hof	Bavaria
Homeland Defence Regiment 1	7./Homeland Defence Regiment 1	Homeland Defence Company Niederbayern	Bogen	Bavaria
Homeland Defence Regiment 1	8./Homeland Defence Regiment 1	Homeland Defence Company Oberpfalz	Kümmersbruck	Bavaria
Homeland Defence Regiment 1	9./Homeland Defence Regiment 1	Homeland Defence Company Schwaben	Dillingen an der Donau	Bavaria
Homeland Defence Regiment 1	10./Homeland Defence Regiment 1	Homeland Defence Company Oberbayern	Murnau am Staffelsee	Bavaria
Homeland Defence Regiment 1	11./Homeland Defence Regiment 1	Homeland Defence Company Donau-Pfalz	Münchsmünster	Bavaria
Homeland Defence Regiment 1	12./Homeland Defence Regiment 1	Homeland Defence Company Odenwald	Walldürn	Baden-Württemberg
Homeland Defence Regiment 1	13./Homeland Defence Regiment 1	Homeland Defence Company Oberrhein	Bruchsal	Baden-Württemberg
Homeland Defence Regiment 1	14./Homeland Defence Regiment 1	Homeland Defence Company Schwäbische Alb	Stetten am kalten Markt	Baden-Württemberg
Homeland Defence Regiment 1	15./Homeland Defence Regiment 1	Homeland Defence Company Linzgau	Pfullendorf	Baden-Württemberg
Homeland Defence Regiment 2	1./Homeland Defence Regiment 2	Staff & Supply Company	Münster	North Rhine-Westphalia
Homeland Defence Regiment 2	2./Homeland Defence Regiment 2	Support Company	Münster	North Rhine-Westphalia
Homeland Defence Regiment 2	3./Homeland Defence Regiment 2	Training Company	Münster	North Rhine-Westphalia
Homeland Defence Regiment 2	4./Homeland Defence Regiment 2	Homeland Defence Company Rheinland	Düsseldorf	North Rhine-Westphalia
Homeland Defence Regiment 2	5./Homeland Defence Regiment 2	Homeland Defence Company Ruhrgebiet	Unna	North Rhine-Westphalia
Homeland Defence Regiment 2	6./Homeland Defence Regiment 2	Homeland Defence Company Westfalen	Ahlen	North Rhine-Westphalia
Homeland Defence Regiment 2	7./Homeland Defence Regiment 2	Homeland Defence Company Saarland	Saarlouis	Saarland
Homeland Defence Regiment 2	8./Homeland Defence Regiment 2	Homeland Defence Company Hunsrück	Baumholder	Rhineland-Palatinate
Homeland Defence Regiment 2	9./Homeland Defence Regiment 2	Homeland Defence Company Kurpfalz	Germersheim	Rhineland-Palatinate
Homeland Defence Regiment 2	10./Homeland Defence Regiment 2	Homeland Defence Company Rheinland Pfalz	Mainz	Rhineland-Palatinate
Homeland Defence Regiment 3	1./Homeland Defence Regiment 3	Staff & Supply Company	Nienburg	Lower Saxony
Homeland Defence Regiment 3	2./Homeland Defence Regiment 3	Support Company	Nienburg	Lower Saxony
Homeland Defence Regiment 3	3./Homeland Defence Regiment 3	Training Company	Nienburg	Lower Saxony
Homeland Defence Regiment 3	4./Homeland Defence Regiment 3	Homeland Defence Company Solling	Holzminden	Lower Saxony
Homeland Defence Regiment 3	5./Homeland Defence Regiment 3	Homeland Defence Company Nordheide	Lüneburg	Lower Saxony
Homeland Defence Regiment 3	6./Homeland Defence Regiment 3	Homeland Defence Company Küste	Wittmund	Lower Saxony
Homeland Defence Regiment 3	7./Homeland Defence Regiment 3	Homeland Defence Company Hannover	Hannover	Lower Saxony
Homeland Defence Regiment 3	8./Homeland Defence Regiment 3	Homeland Defence Company Bremen I	Bremen	Bremen
Homeland Defence Regiment 3	9./Homeland Defence Regiment 3	Homeland Defence Company Bremen II	Bremerhaven	Bremen
Homeland Defence Regiment 4	1./Homeland Defence Regiment 4	Staff & Supply Company	Alt Duvenstedt	Schleswig-Holstein
Homeland Defence Regiment 4	2./Homeland Defence Regiment 4	Support Company	Alt Duvenstedt	Schleswig-Holstein
Homeland Defence Regiment 4	3./Homeland Defence Regiment 4	Training Company	Alt Duvenstedt	Schleswig-Holstein
Homeland Defence Regiment 4	4./Homeland Defence Regiment 4	Homeland Defence Company Ostsee	Parow	Mecklenburg-Vorpommern
Homeland Defence Regiment 4	5./Homeland Defence Regiment 4	Homeland Defence Company Mecklenburg	Schwerin	Mecklenburg-Vorpommern
Homeland Defence Regiment 4	6./Homeland Defence Regiment 4	Homeland Defence Company Vorpommern	Neubrandenburg	Mecklenburg-Vorpommern
Homeland Defence Regiment 4	7./Homeland Defence Regiment 4	Homeland Defence Company Hamburg	Hamburg	Hamburg
Homeland Defence Regiment 4	8./Homeland Defence Regiment 4	Homeland Defence Company Schleswig	Husum	Schleswig-Holstein
Homeland Defence Regiment 4	9./Homeland Defence Regiment 4	Homeland Defence Company Holstein	Eutin	Schleswig-Holstein
Homeland Defence Regiment 5	1./Homeland Defence Regiment 5	Staff & Supply Company	Ohrdruf	Thuringia
Homeland Defence Regiment 5	2./Homeland Defence Regiment 5	Support Company	Ohrdruf	Thuringia
Homeland Defence Regiment 5	3./Homeland Defence Regiment 5	Training Company	Ohrdruf	Thuringia
Homeland Defence Regiment 5	4./Homeland Defence Regiment 5	Homeland Defence Company Nordhessen	Frankenberg	Hesse
Homeland Defence Regiment 5	5./Homeland Defence Regiment 5	Homeland Defence Company Mittelhessen	Wiesbaden	Hesse
Homeland Defence Regiment 5	6./Homeland Defence Regiment 5	Homeland Defence Company Südhessen	Wiesbaden	Hesse
Homeland Defence Regiment 5	7./Homeland Defence Regiment 5	Homeland Defence Company Thüringen	Erfurt	Thuringia
Homeland Defence Regiment 5	8./Homeland Defence Regiment 5	Homeland Defence Company Sachsen	Dresden	Saxony
Homeland Defence Regiment 6	1./Homeland Defence Regiment 6	Staff & Supply Company	Altengrabow	Saxony-Anhalt
Homeland Defence Regiment 6	2./Homeland Defence Regiment 6	Support Company	Altengrabow	Saxony-Anhalt
Homeland Defence Regiment 6	3./Homeland Defence Regiment 6	Training Company	Altengrabow	Saxony-Anhalt
Homeland Defence Regiment 6	4./Homeland Defence Regiment 6	Homeland Defence Company Berlin I	Berlin	Berlin
Homeland Defence Regiment 6	5./Homeland Defence Regiment 6	Homeland Defence Company Berlin II	Berlin	Berlin
Homeland Defence Regiment 6	6./Homeland Defence Regiment 6	Homeland Defence Company Brandenburg I	Potsdam	Brandenburg
Homeland Defence Regiment 6	7./Homeland Defence Regiment 6	Homeland Defence Company Brandenburg II	Potsdam	Brandenburg
Homeland Defence Regiment 6	8./Homeland Defence Regiment 6	Homeland Defence Company Sachsen-Anhalt I	Magdeburg	Saxony-Anhalt
Homeland Defence Regiment 6	9./Homeland Defence Regiment 6	Homeland Defence Company Sachsen-Anhalt II	Klietz	Saxony-Anhalt

== History ==
The establishment of the Homeland Defence Division was first publicly announced in November 2024 and officially announced in January 2025. The division was established on 14 March 2025 as a partially active division in the Julius Leber Barracks in Berlin. It is the fourth division in the German Army alongside the Rapid Forces Division, the 1st Panzer Division and the 10th Panzer Division. An establishment staff was commissioned on 13 December 2024, and the Homeland Defence Division staff was commissioned on 1 January 2025. The first commander of the Homeland Defence Division was the former deputy commander of the Bundeswehr Territorial Command (Territoriales Führungskommando der Bundeswehr), Major General Andreas Henne.

Since April 1, 2025, all existing Homeland Defence regiments and Homeland Defence companies have been subordinate to the Homeland Defence Division. The establishment of up to twelve homeland security regiments is planned in the medium term.
