= Wolfsteiner Ohe =

River in Germany

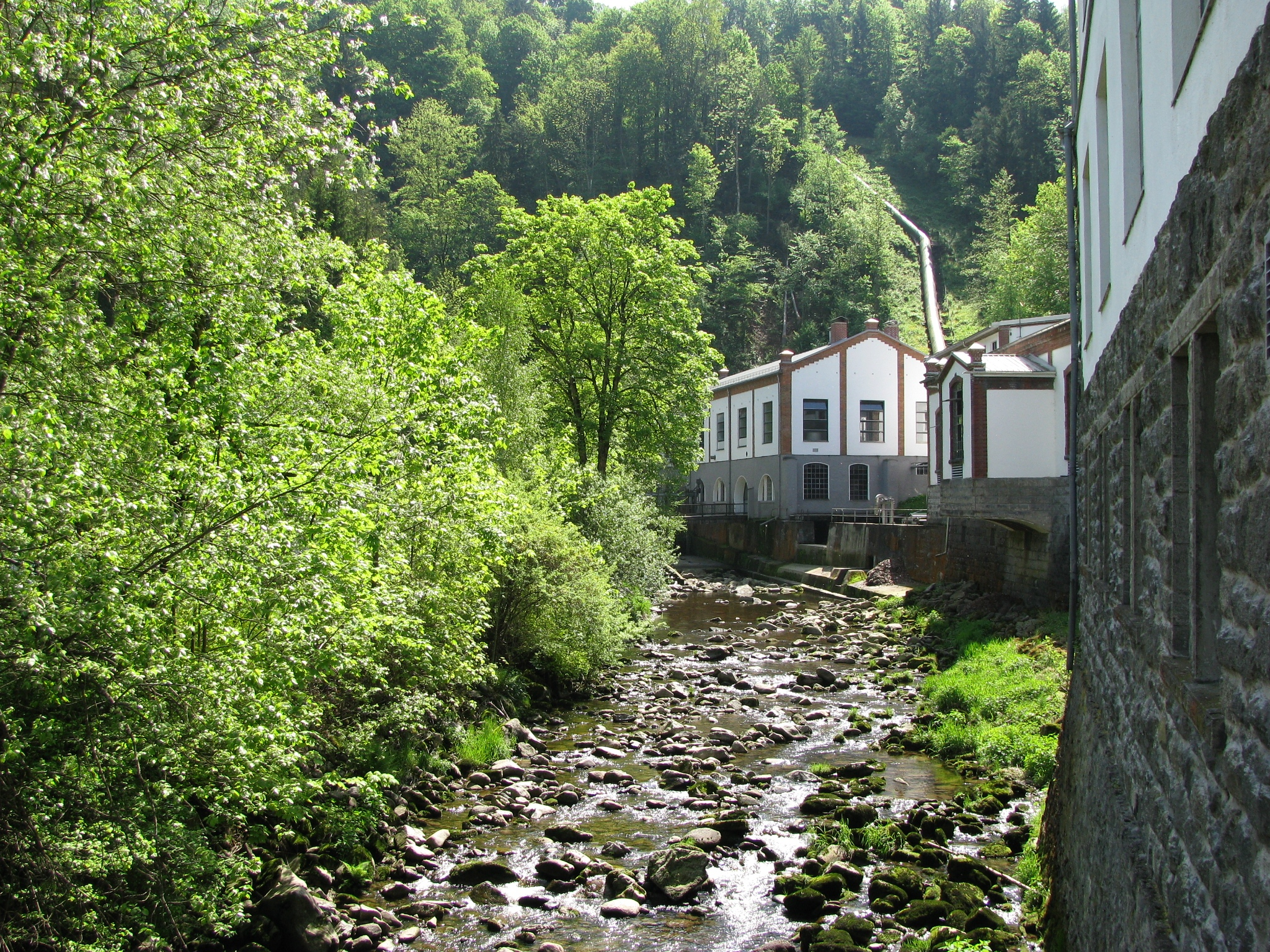
- The Wolfsteiner Ohe at the Carbidwerk Freyung

Location
- Country: Germany
- State: Bavaria

Physical characteristics
- Mouth
  - location: Ilz
  - coordinates: 48.7183°N 13.4545°E
- Length: 22.5 km (14.0 mi)
- Basin size: 372 km^{2} (144 sq mi)

Basin features
- Progression: Ilz→ Danube→ Black Sea

Wolfsteiner Ohe is a river of Bavaria, Germany. It is formed at the confluence of the Saußbach and the Reschbach west of Freyung. It flows into the Ilz near Fürsteneck.

== See also ==
- List of rivers of Bavaria
