= Kleine Ohe (Danube) =

River in Germany

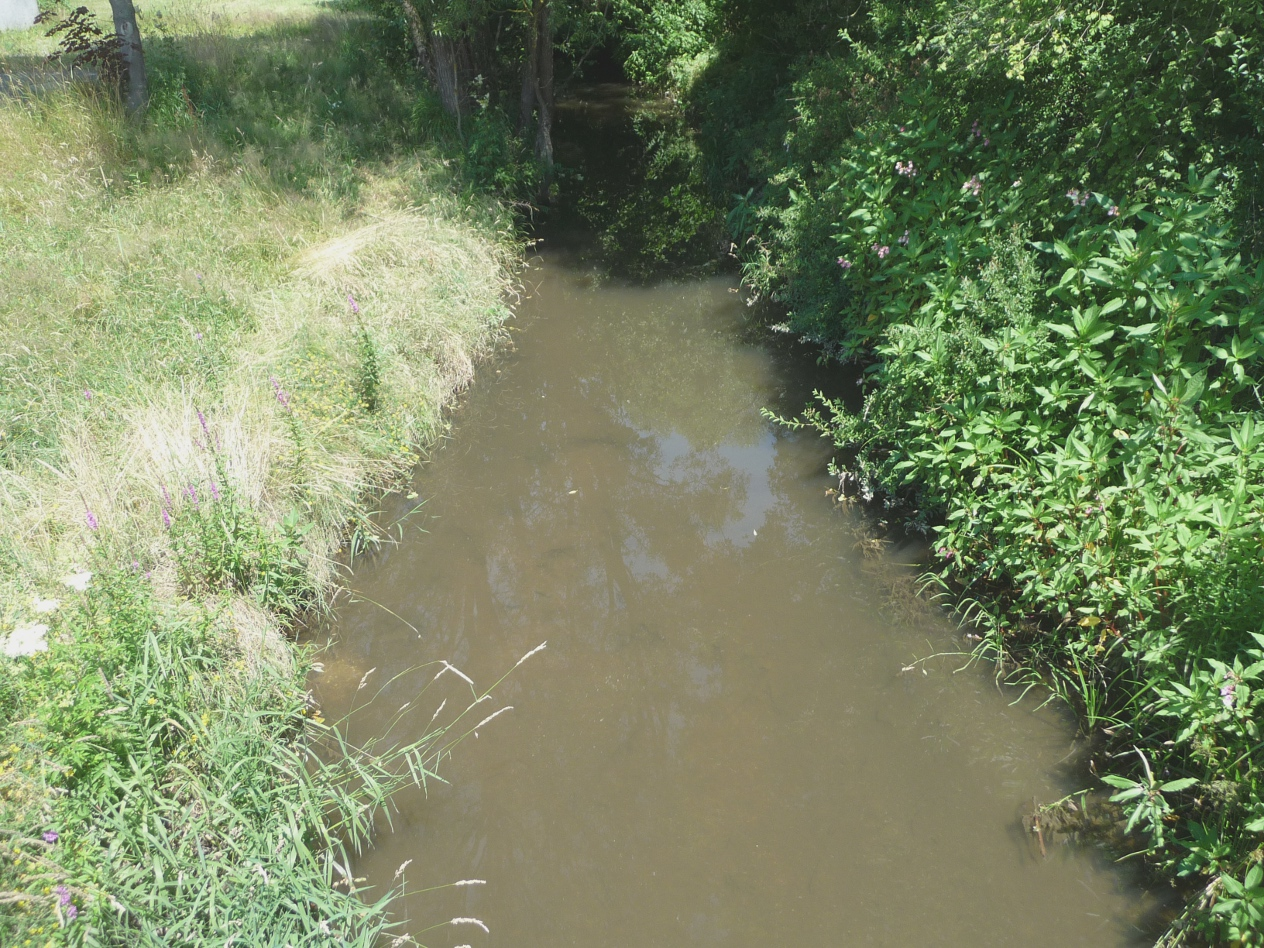
- The Kleine Ohe at Schöllnach

Location
- Country: Germany
- State: Bavaria

Physical characteristics
- Mouth
  - location: Danube
  - coordinates: 48.6636°N 13.1303°E
- Length: 31.6 km (19.6 mi)
- Basin size: 85 km^{2} (33 sq mi)

Basin features
- Progression: Danube→ Black Sea
- River system: Danube

Kleine Ohe (also: Schöllnach) is a river of Bavaria, Germany. It is a left tributary of the Danube near Hofkirchen.

The river also named Schöllnach, which rises near the Brotjacklriegel, drains the low mountain range to the south. It passes through several villages with similar names, such as Markt Schöllnach, Schöllnstein and the districts of Hofkirchen (Donau) Ober- and Unterschöllnach.

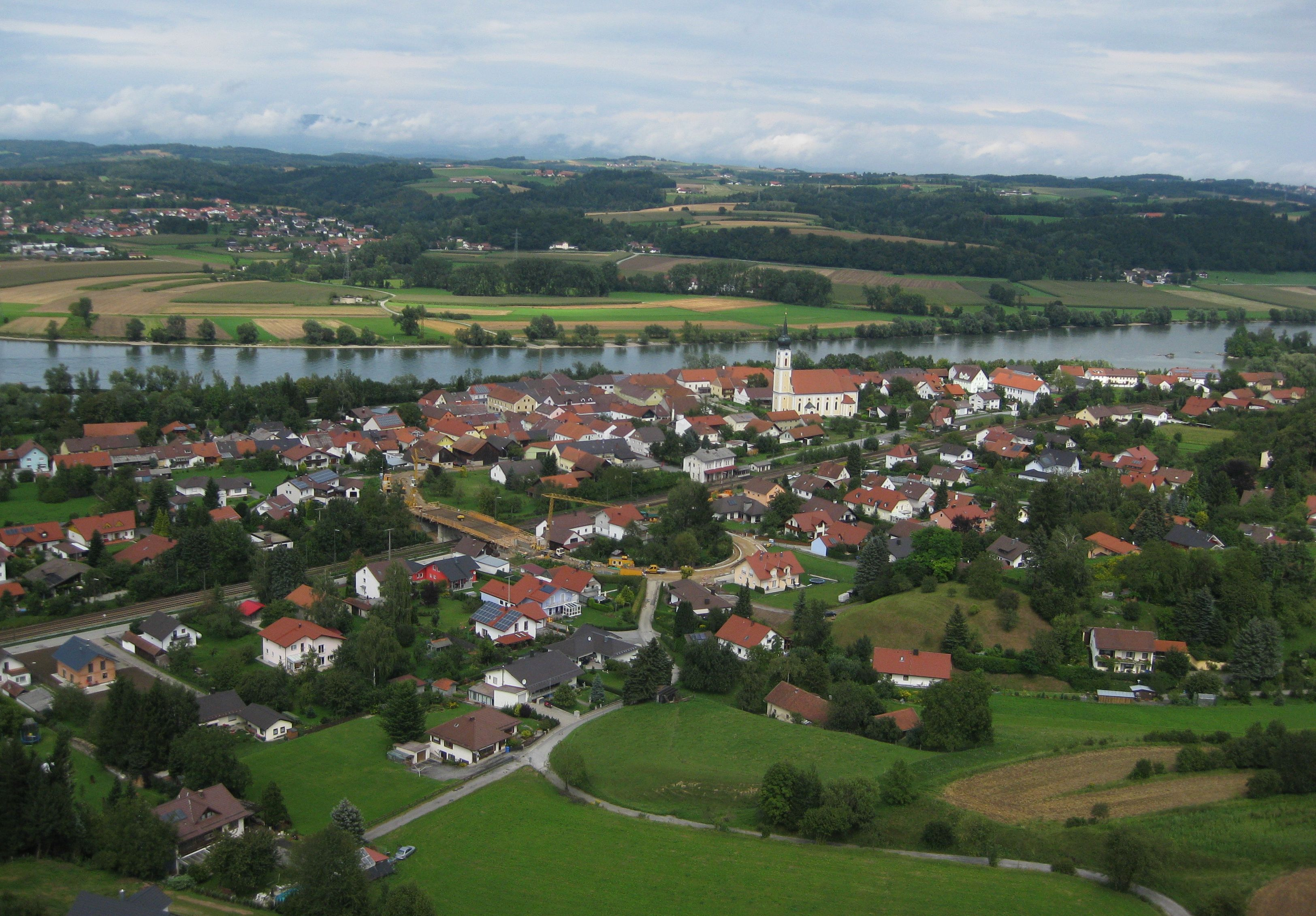
Mouth of the Kleine Ohe into the Danube

== See also ==
- List of rivers of Bavaria
