= Rheinmetall KZO =

Aircraft model

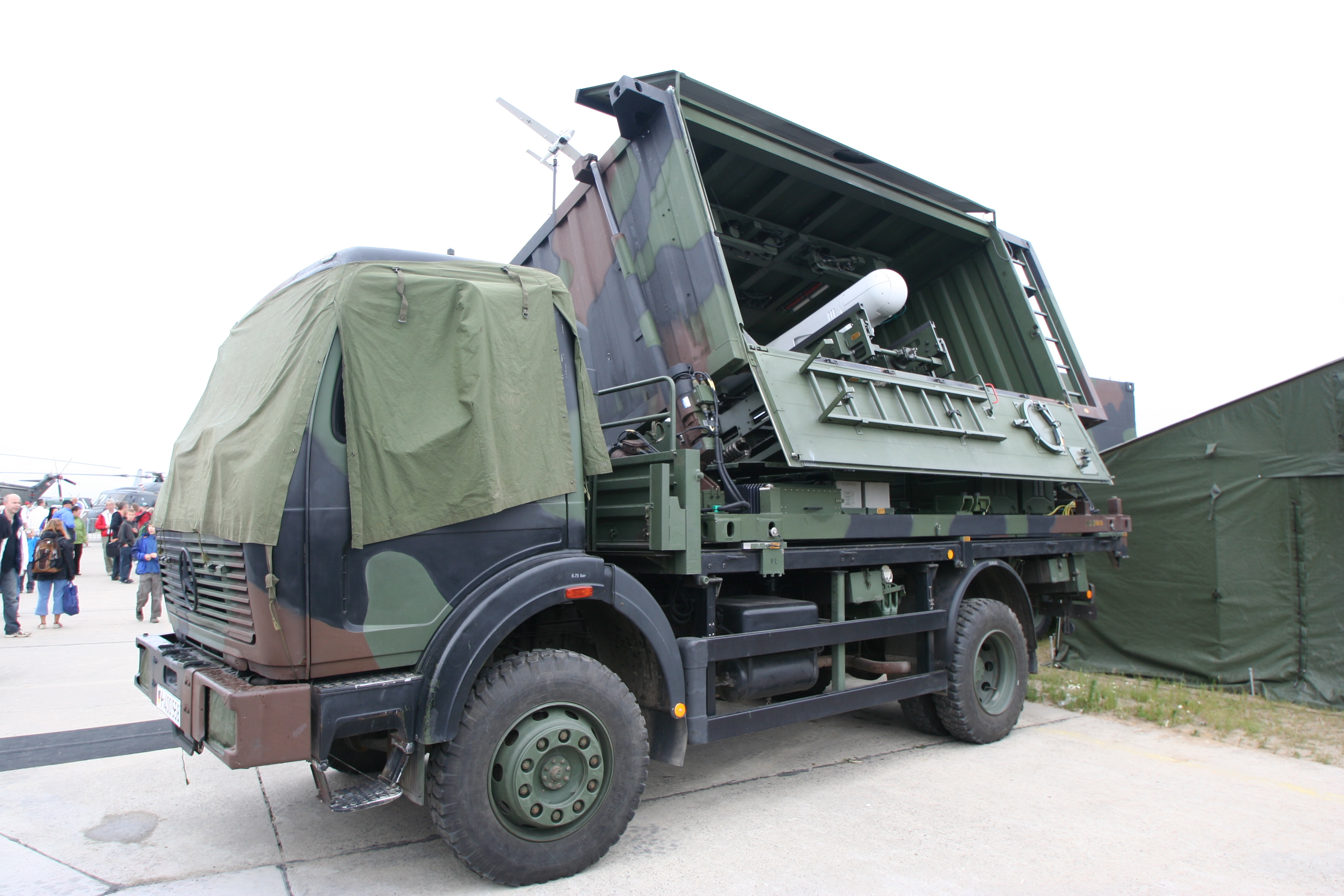
Rheinmetall KZO at ILA 2010

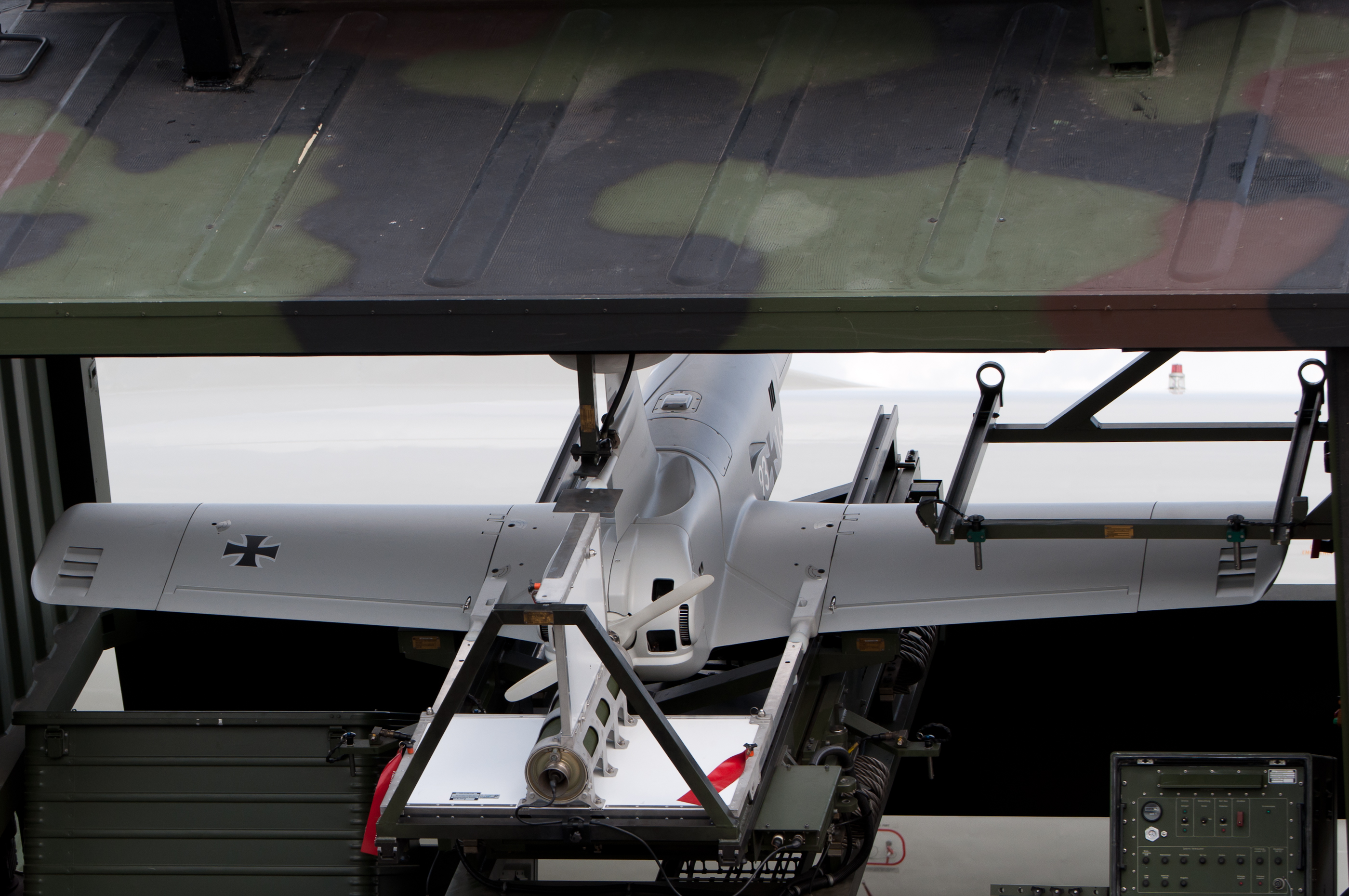
Rheinmetall KZO mounted on its launcher

KZO (Kleinflugzeug für Zielortung, German for small aircraft for target acquisition) is an unmanned aerial vehicle (UAV) with stealth characteristics manufactured by Airbus Defence and Space Airborne Solutions GmbH of Germany. Airbus Defence and Space Airborne Solutions GmbH is a joint venture of Airbus Defence and Space and Rheinmetall.

A KZO system consists of 10 UAVs and 2 ground units, consisting of one control station, one radio, one launch, one maintenance vehicle with a refuelling facility for the UAVs and one recovery vehicle.

The UAV is launched with a booster rocket directly out of its container. Landing is done with a parachute.

The KZO's main objective is to locate mobile threats and provide target locations for artillery. KZO replaced the German Army's other main UAV, Drohne CL 289.

The Taifun attack drone was a concept of an armed variant fitted with an intelligent millimeter-wave radar seeker that perform search and destroy attacks autonomously. It destroys its target with a hollow-charge warhead. However, the German Army decided against this concept in favor of the IAI Harop.

Two electronic warfare variants have also been developed as the Mücke ("mosquito") and the Fledermaus ("bat").

The initial system has been sold to China.

== Features ==
- Wingspan: 3.42m
- Length: 2.28m
- Body diameter: 0.36m
- Noise-reduced two-stroke engine driving 2 blade propeller
- Cruise speed: 220 km/h
- Endurance: 4 hours
- Sensor: stabilized forward looking infrared
- Digital data recorder for 10 minutes of video data
- Real-time datalink
- Navigation: inertial, location via datalink, additionally GPS (not needed for operation)
- Reduced visual, acoustic, radar and infrared signature (stealth technology)
