= Alt Duvenstedt =

- Municipality
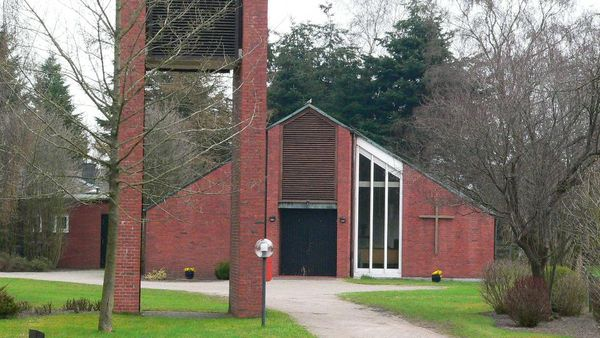
- Church in Alt Duvenstedt

- Flag Coat of arms

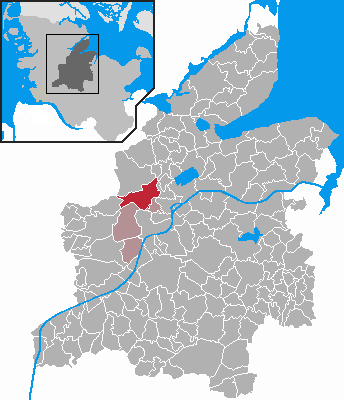
- Location of Alt Duvenstedt within Rendsburg-Eckernförde district
- Interactive map of Alt Duvenstedt
- Location within Germany Location within Schleswig-Holstein
- Coordinates: 54°21′30″N 9°38′40″E
- Country: Germany
- State: Schleswig-Holstein
- District: Rendsburg-Eckernförde
- Municipal assoc.: Fockbek

Government
  - Mayor: Peter Eichen

Area
  - Total: 20.43 km^{2} (7.89 sq mi)
- Elevation: 8 m (26 ft)

Population (2025-12-31)
  - Total: 1,900
  - Density: 93/km^{2} (240/sq mi)
- Time zone: UTC+01:00 (CET)
  - Summer (DST): UTC+02:00 (CEST)
- Postal codes: 24791
- Dialling codes: 04335, 04336, 04338
- Vehicle registration: RD
- Website: www.fockbek.de

Alt Duvenstedt is a municipality in the district of Rendsburg-Eckernförde, in Schleswig-Holstein, Germany.
