= Kleine Ohe (Ilz) =

River in Germany

- The Kleine Ohe in the Bavarian Forest National Park

Location
- Country: Germany
- State: Bavaria

Physical characteristics
- Mouth
  - location: Ilz
  - coordinates: 48.8178°N 13.3701°E
- Length: 26.8 km (16.7 mi)

Basin features
- Progression: Ilz→ Danube→ Black Sea

The Kleine Ohe is a river of Bavaria, Germany. It is a headwater of the Ilz in Eberhardsreuth, a part of Schönberg.

== See also ==
- List of rivers of Bavaria
