= Freyung, Bavaria =

Freyung
- Town
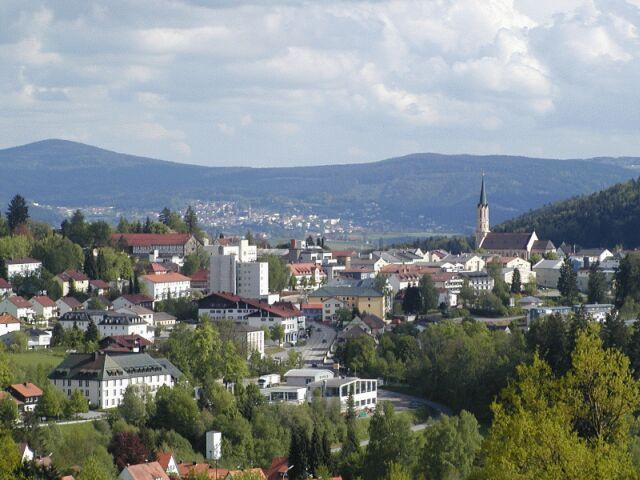
- Freyung

- Coat of arms

- Location of Freyung within Freyung-Grafenau district
- Interactive map of Freyung
- Location within Germany Location within Bavaria
- Coordinates: 48°48′N 13°33′E
- Country: Germany
- State: Bavaria
- Admin. region: Niederbayern
- District: Freyung-Grafenau
- Subdivisions: 3 Stadtteile

Government
  - Mayor (2020–26): Dr. Olaf Heinrich (CSU)

Area
  - Total: 48.63 km^{2} (18.78 sq mi)
- Elevation: 655 m (2,149 ft)

Population (2025-12-31)
  - Total: 7,059
  - Density: 145.2/km^{2} (376.0/sq mi)
- Time zone: UTC+01:00 (CET)
  - Summer (DST): UTC+02:00 (CEST)
- Postal codes: 94078
- Dialling codes: 08551, 08558
- Vehicle registration: FRG
- Website: www.freyung.de

Freyung (German pronunciation: [ˈfʁaɪʊŋ]) is a town in Bavaria and capital of the Freyung-Grafenau district. It is situated in the Bavarian Forest mountain range, near the border with Austria and the Czech Republic.

== Geography ==
The town is situated on the southeastern rim of the Bavarian Forest National Park near the confluence of the Saußbach and Reschbach creeks. The town centre is located about 33 km (21 mi) north of Passau and just 18 km (11 mi) west of the border to Czechia. Freyung is divided into 27 different settlements.

== History ==
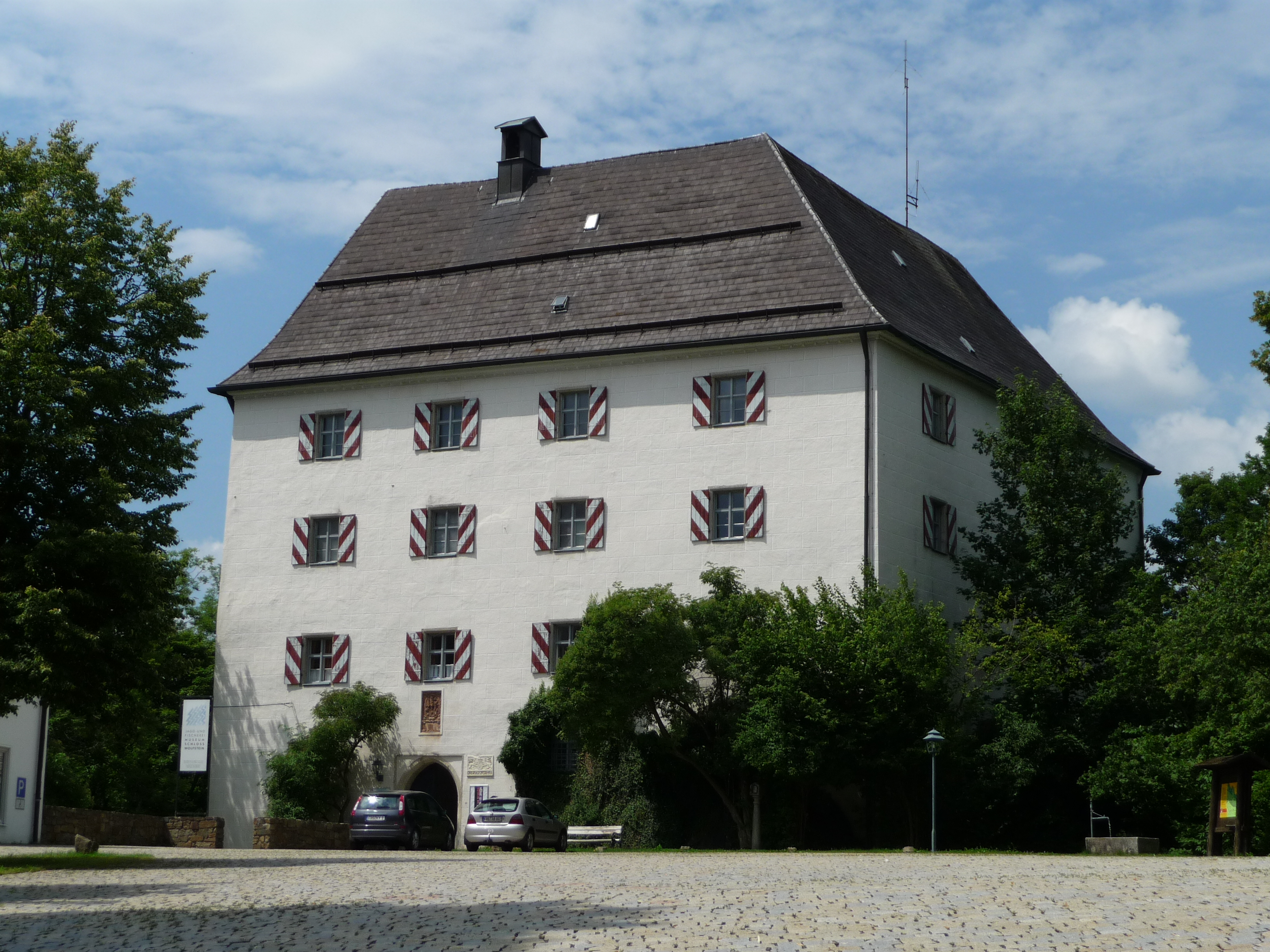
Wolfstein Castle

=== First settlements ===
The first known settlements in the area of today's town of Freyung are from the 13th century. The inhabitants settled in a clearing village near the old Wolfstein Castle, which Bishop Wolfger von Erla had built around 1200. Before that, Emperor Henry VI had ceded the land to some of the bishops of Passau in 1193. At that time, Freyung was not yet a place name, but referred to an area. The later name Freiung denoted the fact that the first settlers were exempt from taxes (cf. Freihaus). In 1301, this place was first mentioned in documents as Purchstol zu Wolferstein, with a forest attached to it. As early as 1354, the neighboring town of Kreuzberg, which had been founded at the beginning of the 14th century, was granted market rights, which were transferred to Freyung in 1523.

=== 19th century ===
When the Prince-Bishopric of Passau was dissolved in 1803 with the Imperial Deputation Act, Freyung first fell to the Austrian Duchy of Salzburg and two years the Kingdom of Bavaria with the Peace of Pressburg. 535 people were living in the town in 1811, however, in a devastating town fire in 1872, 39 of the approximately 70 houses were destroyed. A settlement was laid out beneath the castle which in 1301 was mentioned as Purchstol zu Wolferstein.

=== 20th century and after ===
On December 3, 1953, Freyung was elevated to town status. After the incorporation of Ort, Freyung was part of the Wolfstein district from April 1, 1954, to June 30, 1972. After the district was merged with the Grafenau district, it became the district town of the Freyung-Grafenau district. Freyung had received the opportunity to host the yearly Bavarian Regional Garden Show in 2022, however had to move it to 2023 because of COVID. The event was also visited by Markus Söder.

=== Population ===
Year	1961	1970	1987	1991	1995	2005	2010	2015	2017	2023
Population	6862	7282	7124	7458	7409	7235	6923	7194	7187	7263

== Politics ==
=== City council ===
Party	Percentage of votes
Christian Social Union (CSU)	48,15 %
Citizens' Community City and Country (BGStuL)	20,57 %
Ecological Democratic Party (ödp)	10,81 %
Non-partisan Voters Freyung-Kreuzberg (ÜWFK)	9,96 %
Young Voters Union (JWU)	10,52 %

=== Mayors ===
- 1946–1952: Josef Haas
- 1952–1956: Ludwig Heydn
- 1956–1972: Josef Lang
- 1972–1978: Otto Fink
- 1978–2002: Fritz Wimmer
- 2002–2008: Peter Kaspar
- 2008–present: Olaf Heinrich

== Infrastructure ==
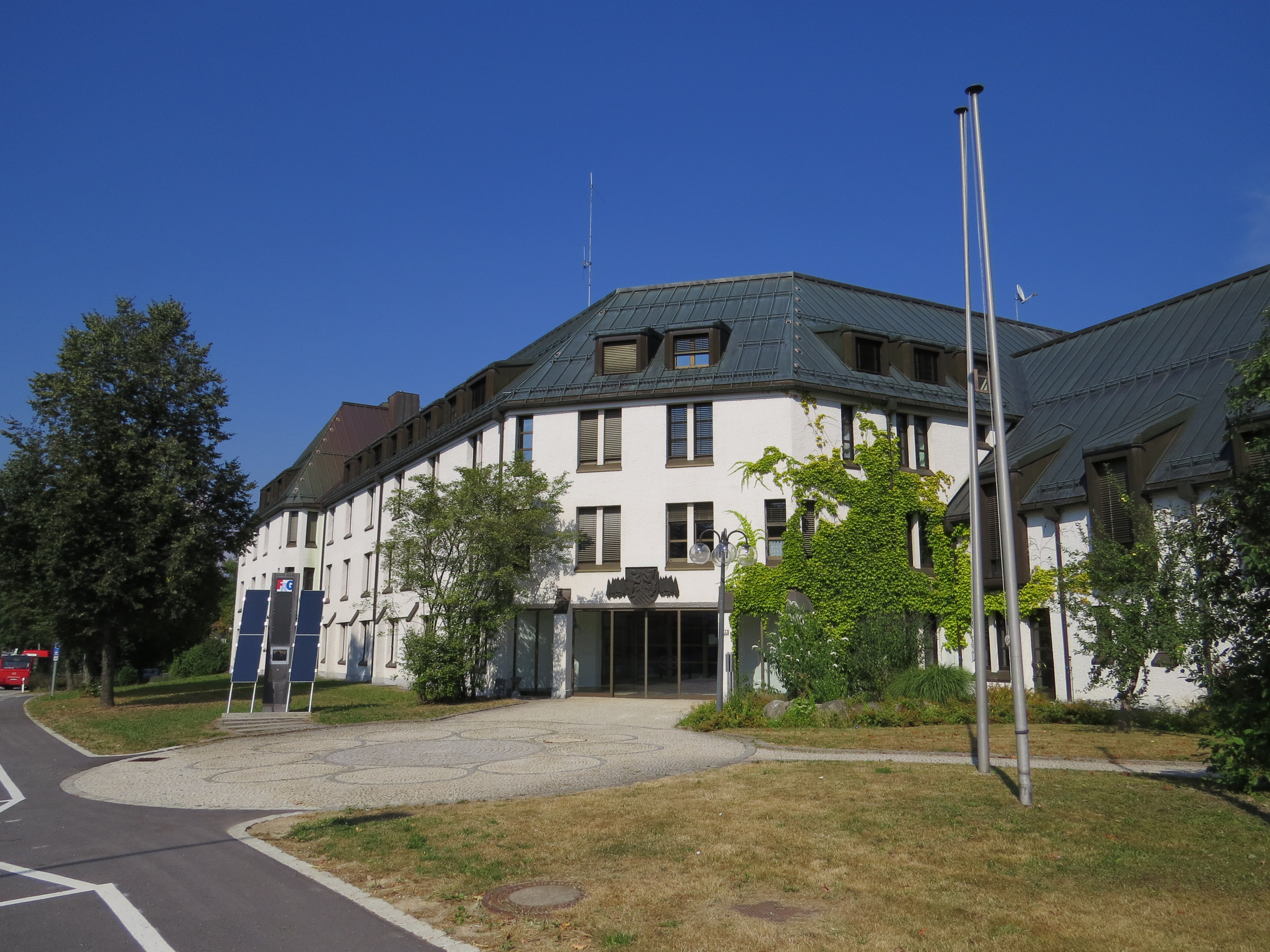
The district court "Landratsamt"

=== Public facilities ===
- Freyung District Hospital
- Freyung Surveying Office
- Freyung District Court
- Freyung-Grafenau District Office
- Health Department
- Library
- Municipal Waterworks
- State Veterinary Office
- Volunteer Fire Department
- Weekly Market
- Barracks on the Goldener Steig, location of the 8th Reconnaissance Battalion.

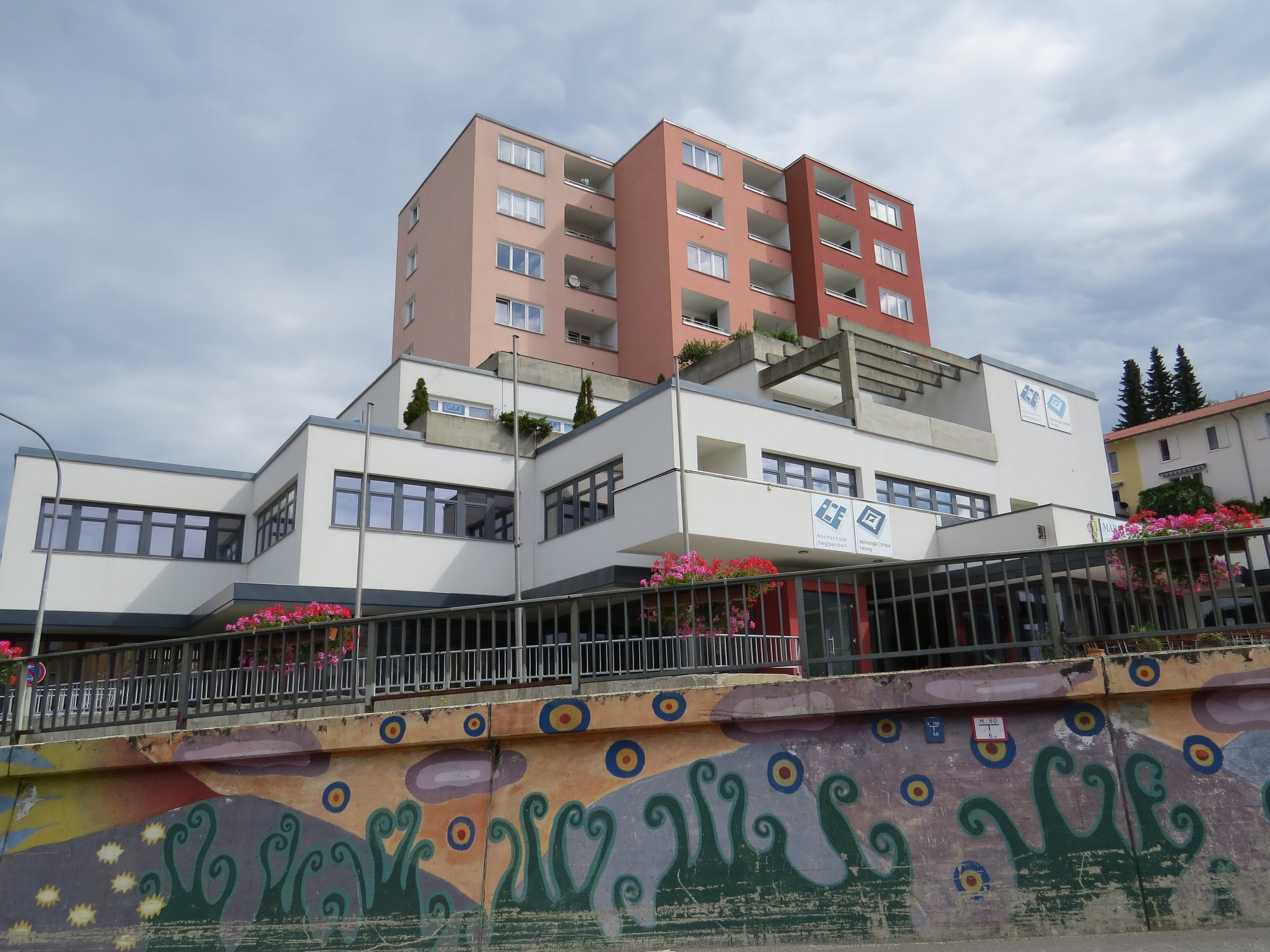
Technology Campus

=== Education and science ===
- Kindergarten
- Child day care
- Forest kindergarten
- Primary school
- Mittelschule
- Realschule
- Gymnasium
- Montessori School
- Support center
- Catholic adult education
- Adult education center
- Music school
- Technology Campus, branch of the Deggendorf University of Applied Sciences with three Chairs for geoinformatics, embedded systems and bionics.
- Folk Music Academy
- Police Academy

== Twin towns ==
Freyung is twinned with

- Vimperk, Czech Republic
- Seewalchen am Attersee, Austria

== Notable people ==
- Severin Freund (born 1988), ski jumper
- Shkemb Miftari (born 1993), footballer
