= Ilz =

River in Germany

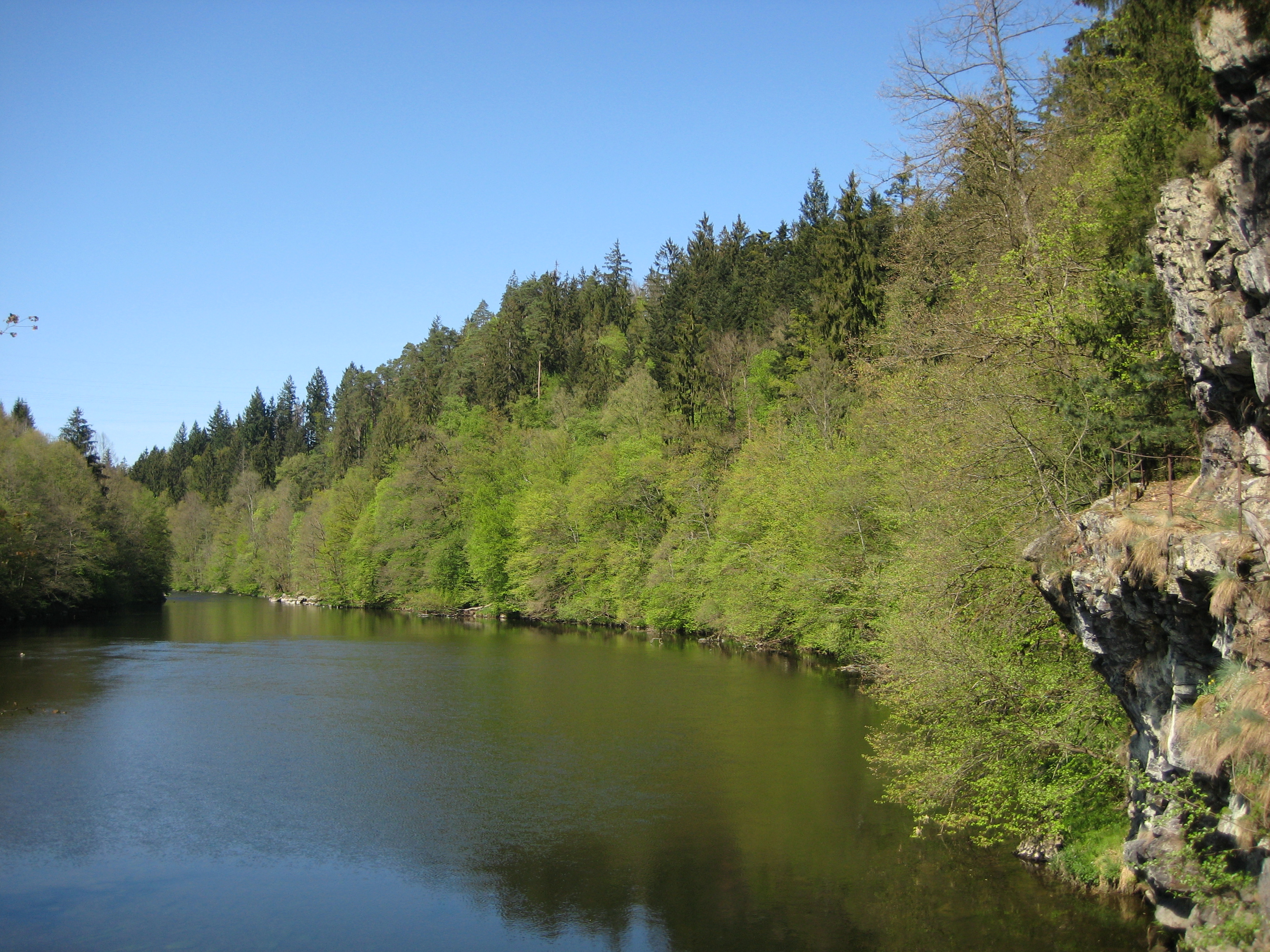
- Ilz near Passau

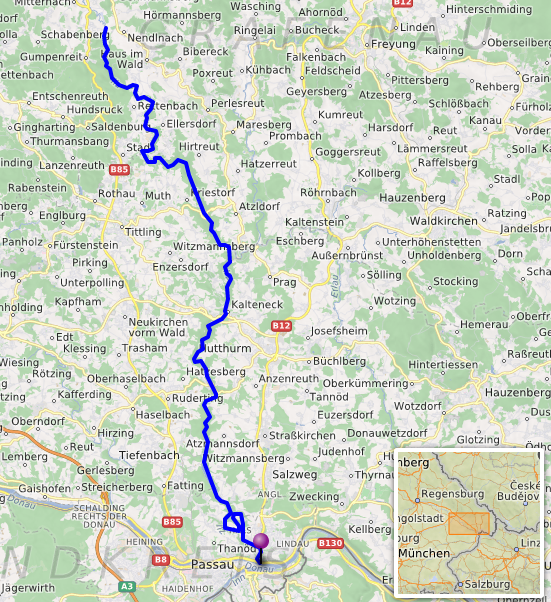
- OSM map

Location
- Country: Germany
- State: Bavaria

Physical characteristics
- Source
  - location: Bavarian Forest
  - elevation: ±430 m (1,410 ft)
- Mouth
  - location: Danube
  - coordinates: 48°34′31″N 13°28′32″E
- Length: 40.3 km (25.0 mi)
- Basin size: 850 km^{2} (330 sq mi)

Basin features
- Progression: Danube→ Black Sea

The Ilz (German: [ɪlt͡s]) is a river running through the Bavarian Forest, Germany. It is a left tributary of the Danube. During its 40 km (25 mi) length (69 km (43 mi), including its main source river Große Ohe), it travels down a height difference of ~140m.

The Ilz is formed at the confluence of its source rivers Große Ohe and Kleine Ohe in Eberhardsreuth. In the city of Passau it finally enters the Danube. Another town on the Ilz is Fürsteneck.

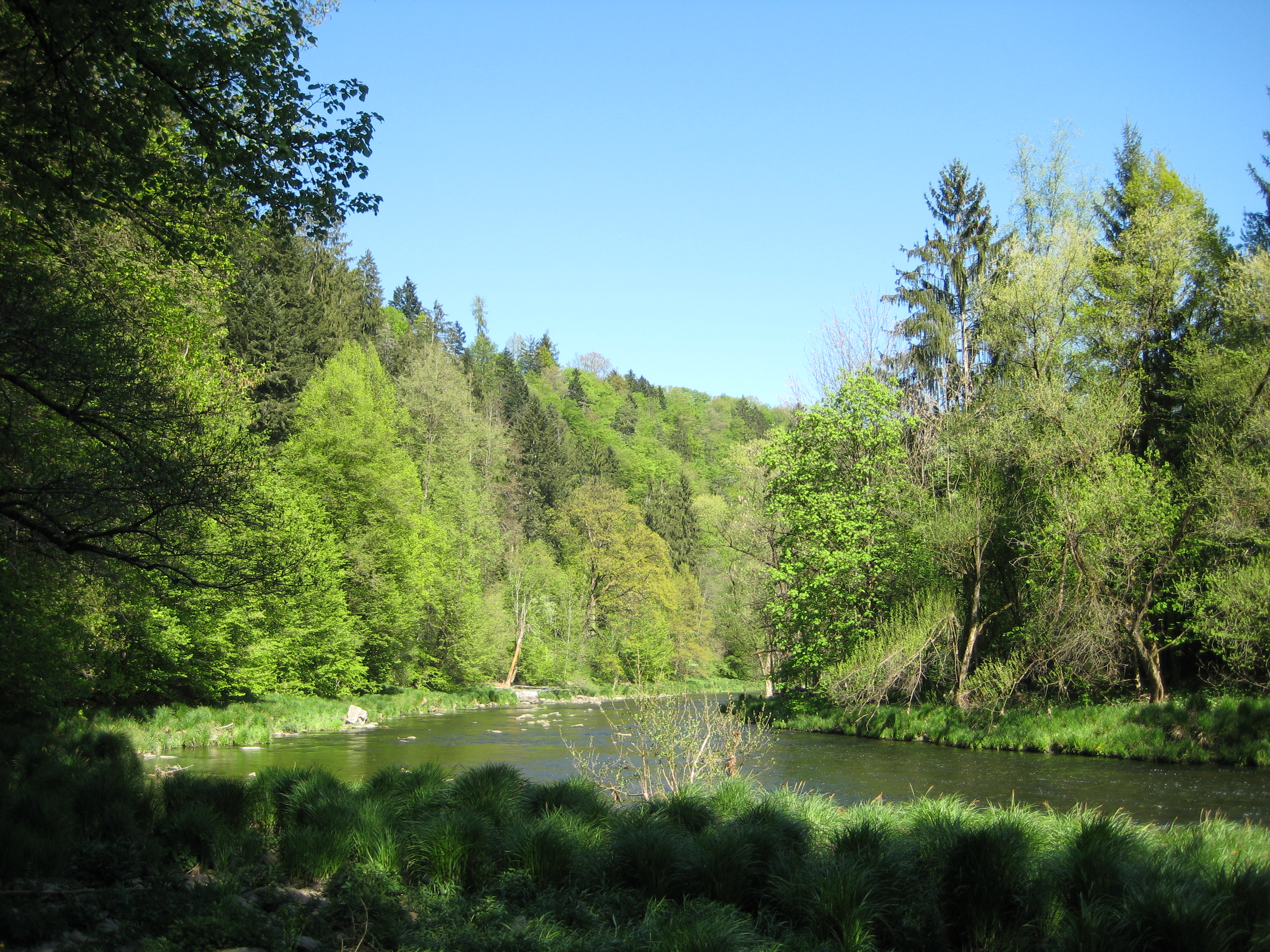
Ilz-Loop between Passau and Oberilzmühle

== See also ==
- List of rivers of Bavaria
