= Battle of Ginchy =

Part of the Battle of the Somme in WWI

- Part of The Battle of the Somme of the First World War
- Battle of Ginchy
Date	9 September 1916
Location	Ginchy, France 50°01′27″N 2°49′59″E
Result	British victory

Belligerents
United Kingdom; British Empire; France	German Empire

Commanders and leaders
(United Kingdom of Great Britain and Ireland) Douglas Haig; (French Third Republic) Ferdinand Foch; (French Third Republic) Émile Fayolle; (United Kingdom of Great Britain and Ireland) Henry Rawlinson; (French Third Republic) Joseph Alfred Micheler	(German Empire) (Kingdom of Bavaria) Crown Prince Rupprecht of Bavaria; (German Empire) Max von Gallwitz; (German Empire) Fritz von Below

Strength
3 divisions	c. 3 divisions

The Battle of Ginchy took place on 9 September 1916 during the Battle of the Somme, when the 16th (Irish) Division captured the German-held village. Ginchy is 0.93 mi (1.5 km) north-east of Guillemont, at the junction of six roads, on a rise overlooking Combles, 2.5 mi (4 km) to the south-east. After the conclusion of the Battle of Guillemont on 6 September, XIV Corps and XV Corps were required to complete the advance to positions which would give observation over the German third position. The advance was to make ready for a general attack in mid-September, for which the Anglo-French armies had been preparing since early August.

British attacks northwards from the boundary between the Fourth Army and the French Sixth Army, from Leuze Wood north to Ginchy, had begun on 3 September when the 7th Division captured the village, then was forced out by a German counter-attack. Attacks on Leuze Wood and attempts to re-take Ginchy on 4 and 5 September were also defeated by German counter-attacks. The 7th Division was relieved by the 16th (Irish) Division and 55th (West Lancashire) Division on the evening of 7 September and the 5th Division was replaced by the 56th (1/1st London) Division on the right at the boundary with the French.

On 9 September the British began a bombardment early in the morning but waited until late afternoon to advance, to deny the Germans time to counter-attack before dark. The British assault in the south by the 56th (1/1st London) Division and the 16th (Irish) Division reached Bouleaux Wood but the attack in the centre was repulsed. On the northern flank, Ginchy was captured by the 16th (Irish) Division and several German counter-attacks were defeated. The loss of Ginchy deprived the Germans of observation posts from which they could observe the battlefield. The success eliminated the salient at Delville Wood, which had been costly to defend, due to observed German artillery-fire from three sides and the many counter-attacks by German infantry in July and August; the attack on 31 August, being the largest mounted by the Germans against the British during the battle.

The success of the attack by the French Sixth Army on 12 September, its biggest operation of the battle and the advance of the right flank of the British Fourth Army from 3 to 9 September, enabled both armies to make much bigger attacks. The assaults were sequenced with attacks by the Tenth and Reserve armies in September, that captured much more ground and inflicted approximately 130,000 casualties on the German defenders. Anglo-French attempts to co-ordinate their attacks had failed from July to early September, due to a combination of disagreements between Haig, Joffre and Foch over tactics, supply difficulties, devastated terrain, inclement weather and the increasing defensive power of the German defence. In September, the Allies managed to co-ordinate their attacks; advances on each army front made adjacent German positions vulnerable, which were attacked promptly by the neighbouring army before the Germans recovered from their disorganisation.

== Background ==
=== Tactical developments ===
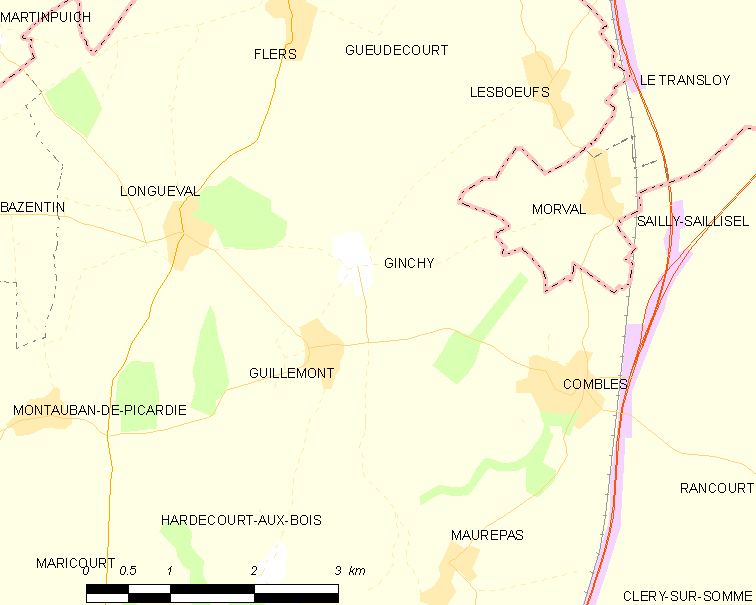
Modern map of Ginchy and vicinity (commune FR insee code 80378)

After the capture of 6,000 yd (3.4 mi; 5.5 km) of the German second position on Bazentin Ridge by the British on 14 July, the Germans had reinforced the flanks of the captured ground and built more fortifications between the second and third positions. On the right flank the British line formed a salient at Longueval and Delville Wood, which ran west to Pozières and south to Maltz Horn Farm, the junction with the French Sixth Army. (Note: Maltz Horn Farm lay about half-way between Hardecourt and Guillemont, due south of Arrow Head Copse, south-east of Trônes Wood and was the boundary between the French Sixth and the British Fourth armies.) The salient was overlooked by German positions from Guillemont to the south-east and High Wood to the north-west. Control of Guillemont and Ginchy also gave the Germans observation of the ground to the south, over the French approaches to the German second line, from the Somme river north to Maurepas and the area between Malz Horn Farm and Falfemont Farm. (Note: Maurepas lay due east of Hardecourt, south-west of Combles on the D 146. The village was a group of farms, each with a meadow bounded by trees at the junction of several roads. Falfemont Farm was a German strong-point, south-east of Wedge Wood and Guillemont, south-west of Leuze Wood on high ground overlooking Allied positions.)

German artillery could fire into the salient and the area beyond, where a huge mass of Allied artillery was based and through which the fronts of the Fourth and French Sixth armies were supplied over a small number of poor roads. In August, Joffre had pressed Haig to continue with big attacks on wide fronts but despite conforming to French strategy, Haig had refused to follow these tactics until the British Armies were ready, being unwilling to risk another fiasco like the attacks of 22/23 July. The British made a large number of small, narrow-front attacks, consistent with the state of training and supply of the British divisions, intended to approximate wide-front attacks, while concentrating artillery firepower opposite Guillemont, on the right flank of the Fourth Army. From late July to early September, many attacks took place to establish the British right flank on Guillemont and Ginchy, ready for a big attack combined with the French Sixth Army and the Reserve Army in mid-September.

Publication of German casualty statistics for July 1916, showed that seven of the twelve divisions engaged by the British in July, had lost more than 50 per cent of their infantry, which increased optimism at British Expeditionary Force (BEF) General Headquarters (GHQ), that the German defence of the Somme front was weakening. GHQ Intelligence made a guess of 130,000 German casualties, while Lieutenant-General George Macdonogh, Director of Military Intelligence at the War Office in London, estimated 150,000 and the French 175,000 German losses. The Bavarian divisions south of the Albert–Bapaume road were assessed to have high morale despite "heavy losses" but it was believed that there were no more than five German divisions left in reserve on the Western Front. (British spy networks in northern France and Flanders had been blown in June 1916, which left the Secret Service and GHQ Intelligence ignorant of German troop movements in the area.)

A general relief of the German divisions on the Somme was known to have been completed in late August and the assessment of German divisions available as reinforcements was increased to eight. GHQ Intelligence considered a German division on the British front was worn-out after 4 1/2 days, even though German divisions averaged twenty days in the line. Of six more German divisions moved to the Somme by 28 August, only two had been known to be in reserve and the other four had been moved from quiet sectors without warning. News of the dismissal of Falkenhayn reached the British on 30 August and it was taken by military intelligence to foreshadow increased German emphasis on the Eastern Front, which would make the German armies in France vulnerable. The "wearing-out" battles since late July and events elsewhere, led to a belief that the big Allied attack planned for mid-September could have decisive effect.

== Prelude ==
=== British preparations ===
The Anglo-French attacks of late July and August had been intended to advance through the un-captured part of the German second position, to Falfemont Farm, Guillemont and Leuze Wood, preparatory to the capture of Ginchy and Bouleaux Wood. The British and French armies were to co-operate to capture the high ground either side of the Combles valley and the French Sixth Army to reach Maurepas, Le Forest, Rancourt and Frégicourt. Fighting to the west of Ginchy at Longueval and Delville Wood had begun on 14 July and continued until 3 September, when all but the eastern corner was captured. The area between the wood and Ginchy, known to the German defenders as the Entschnabel (Duck's Bill) dominated the approaches to the village. An attack from west needed the support of a simultaneous attack northwards on the Entschnabel, to prevent the Germans defeating the attack with enfilade fire and arrangements for the big offensive planned for mid-September continued.

Attacks by XV Corps and III Corps on Delville Wood and High Wood took place during the XIV Corps operations to capture Ginchy. The attacks added to the strain on British engineer services, pioneer, labour and transport units and was made worse by German bombardments, directed from the vantage points still in German possession. In the aftermath of the last attack of the Battle of Guillemont (3 to 6 September), in the XIV Corps area, the 56th (1/1st London) Division relieved the right of the 168th Brigade with the 169th Brigade, from the boundary with the French Sixth Army at the Combles ravine to the southern portion of Leuze Wood. The 168th Brigade sidestepped left to take over part of the line held by the 49th Brigade of the 16th (Irish) Division and an advanced trench dug near Leuze Wood was abandoned. At 11:30 a.m. on 8 September, the 56th (1/1st London) Division attacked down Combles Trench from Leuze Wood, advancing a short distance before a German counter-attack at 5:15 a.m. on 9 September bombed them back to the wood.

=== British plan ===
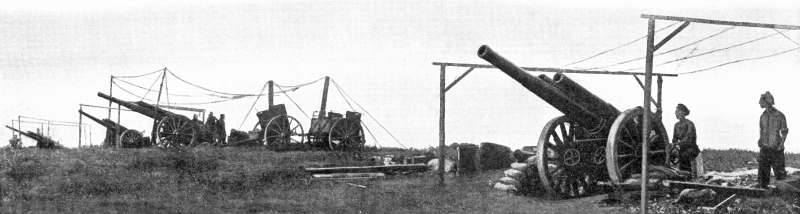
60-pounder battery, Contalmaison

The 22nd Brigade, 7th Division had been withdrawn for only two days, before being sent forward again for the attack on Ginchy. The ground had been torn by shell-fire and made muddy by rain, as the brigade took over the south end of Edge Trench and Devil's Trench in Delville Wood on the left, Stout and Porter trenches on the right facing Ginchy, with a battalion in support in Montauban Alley and a battalion in reserve in Pommiers Trench. A noon attack was planned to mislead the Germans.

On 6 September, a new attack was ordered with XIV Corps to advance to a line from Combles to Leuze Wood road, the Quadrilateral and Ginchy. The 55th Division to the north in the XV Corps area was to support the attack on Ginchy by attacking with the 164th Brigade, between the outskirts of the village and the eastern edge of Delville Wood. The advance was then to continue to Hop Alley and Ale Alley, then from Pint Trench to Lager Lane on the road from Ginchy to Flers; III Corps was to take Wood Lane and the east corner of High Wood. A bombardment was to begin on 9 September at 7:00 a.m., with no increase in intensity before zero at 4:45 p.m., to deceive the Germans as to the time of the attack and to deny them an opportunity to counter-attack before dark.

The French Sixth Army attack as part of the joint plan to isolate Combles further south, also scheduled for 9 September was postponed on 8 September to 12 September due to supply difficulties. On the 56th (1/1st London) Division front, between the Combles ravine and the boundary with the 16th (Irish) Division on the Combles–Guillemont road, the attack of 9 September was to be made behind a creeping barrage from half of the divisional artillery, moving at 100 yd (91 m) per minute. As the creeping barrage met a standing barrage fired by the other half of the divisional artillery on each barrage line successively, the standing barrage would jump ahead to the next objective.

=== German preparations ===
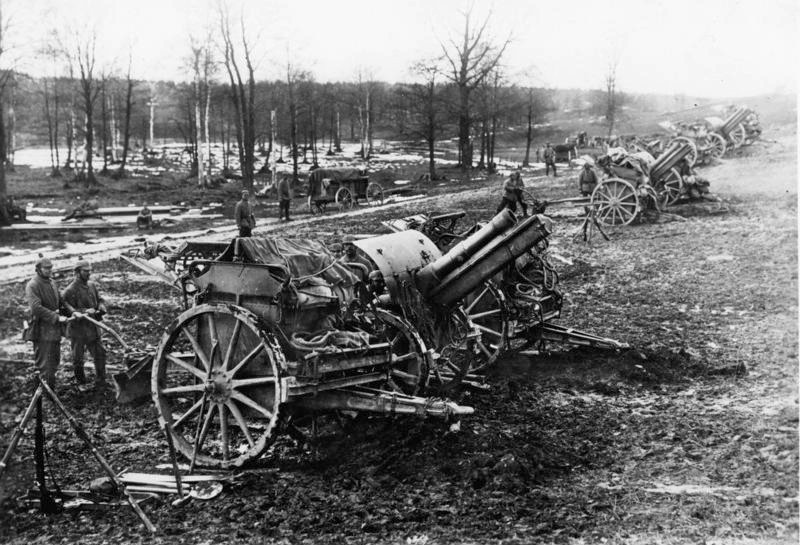
German 15 cm sFH 13 heavy field howitzers

The many British "nibbling" attacks after 14 July had been costly to contain, as German defences had been under frequent artillery bombardment, which had turned German positions into crater-fields, buried the entrances of dug-outs, vaporised barbed-wire and demolished trenches. Allied air superiority and artillery dominated the battlefield and kept the German defenders under constant strain and caused many casualties, the most notable being Falkenhayn who was sacked on 28 August and replaced by Hindenburg and Ludendorff, who scrapped Falkenhayn's policy of rigid defence and automatic counter-attacks.

German field fortifications had evolved since July from a trench-system into an outpost line in shell-holes, with supports and reserves further back in shell-holes or any cover that could be found. The outpost line, containing two or three soldiers every 20 yd (18 m) and the occasional machine-gun was often overrun, after which similar shell-hole positions were improvised by the British before a German counter-attack could be mounted. The hasty German counter-attack (Gegenstoß) was forestalled and the remedy of a well-prepared methodical counter-attack (Gegenangriff) was rarely mounted because of the chronic shortage of infantry, artillery and ammunition.

Attempts to link shell-hole positions failed, because they were visible from the air and British reconnaissance aircraft directed artillery onto them. Trenches were abandoned during an attack in preference for shell-holes further forward. Unobtrusive positions were much harder for British air observers to spot and much more artillery ammunition was needed to bombard areas which were thought to contain them. Trench-lines retained their value as rallying points and accommodation and new ones were built according to the defensive lessons of the Herbstschlacht (Second Battle of Champagne 25 September to 6 November 1915). Back-lines and switch-trenches were dug, as soon as manpower was available, on reverse slopes with artillery observation posts moved 500–1,500 yd (460–1,370 m) further back. In early September, the relief of the defenders of Ginchy by Bavarian Infantry Regiment 19 was rushed, giving the regiment no time to study the ground. By mistake, the boundary between the 5th Bavarian Division and the 185th Division was placed in the village, dividing responsibility for its defence, which was made worse by some of the soldiers in the 185th Division being retrained gunners with little infantry experience.

== Battle ==
=== French armies ===
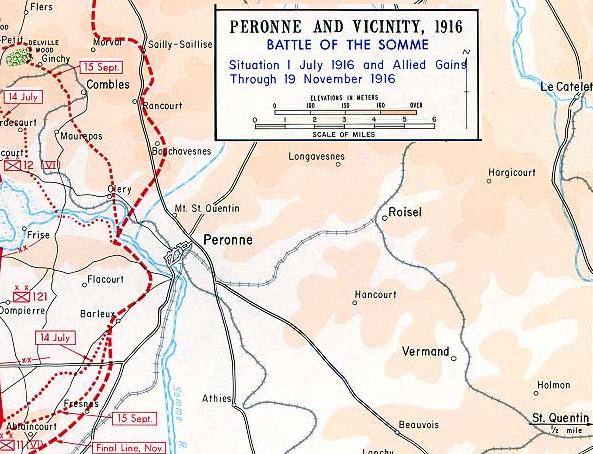
French Tenth and Sixth army areas, 1916

The Sixth Army attacked north of the Somme at noon on 3 September, capturing most of Cléry, the German position along the Cléry to Le Forêt road and all of the village of Le Forêt. (Note: Military units in this section are French unless specified.) On the left I Corps occupied high ground south of Combles and entered Bois Douage, taking 2,000 prisoners and twelve guns. The Tenth Army attacked on the south bank on 4 September, from Chilly to Barleux and took Chilly and Soyécourt after three days of attacks but failed to capture Vermandovillers, Derniécourt and Barleux.

The Sixth Army attacked on the north bank with VII Corps, which advanced on the left and made more gains around Cléry. To the north, the Germans counter-attacked in the Combles ravine, stopping the French advance towards Rancourt. When the British took Falfemont Farm on 5 September, the French gained touch at the Combles ravine and patrols captured Ferme de l'Hôpital, 880 yd (800 m) east of Le Forêt. The rest of Cléry was taken by VII Corps and XXXIII Corps, which had taken Omniécourt on the south bank of the Somme, was met on the right flank. An attack by I Corps, on the boundary with the British Fourth Army on 6 September was repulsed.

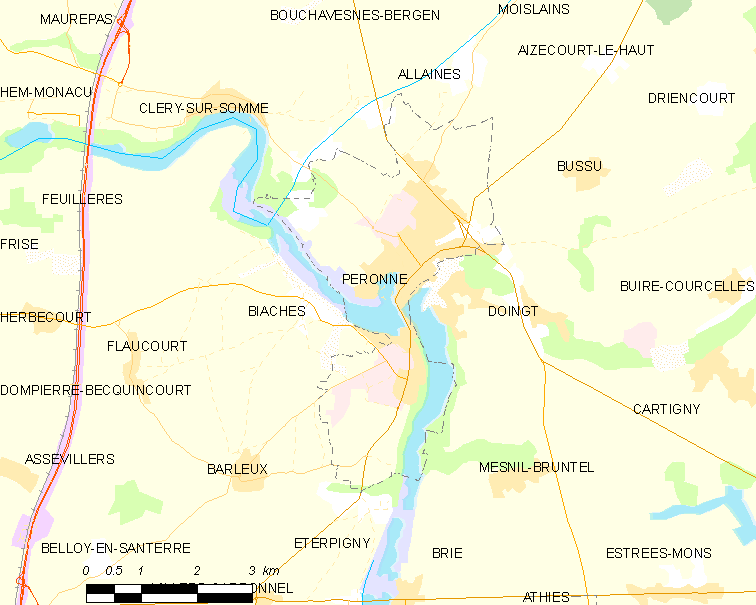
Modern map of Péronne and vicinity (commune FR insee code 80620)

On 12 September, XXXIII Corps attacked towards Mont St Quentin and VII Corps attacked Bouchavesnes, taking the village and digging in facing Cléry and Feuillaucourt. I Corps took Bois d'Anderlu and broke through the German defences near Marrières Wood, before attacking north towards Rancourt and Sailly-Saillisel. On 13 September, I Corps closed on Le Priez Farm and VII Corps defeated several big German counter-attacks. Next day the attacks of VII and XXXIII corps were stopped by mud and German defensive fire.

I Corps managed to take Le Priez Farm. Attacks were suspended again to bring up supplies and relieve tired troops, despite the big British attack due on 15 September. Frégicourt, which overlooked part of the area to be attacked by the British was still held by the Germans. Although Foch wanted to keep pressure on the Germans south of the river, supply priority was given to the Sixth Army; the Tenth Army met frequent German counter-attacks near Berny, which took some ground and was not able to resume its attacks.

=== Fourth Army ===
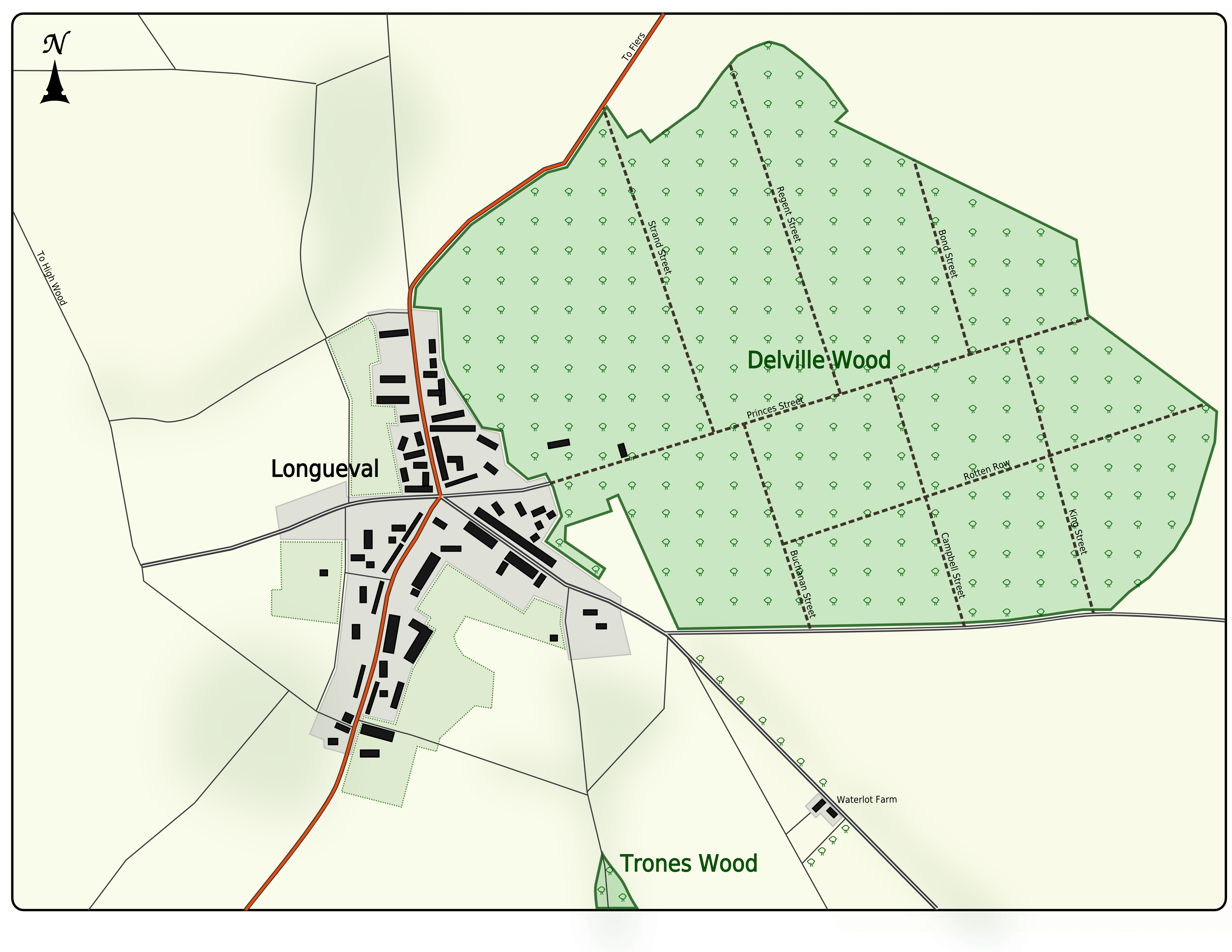
Delville Wood, 1916

British attacks on Ginchy began on 3 September in the XV Corps area, when the 22nd Brigade of the 7th Division advanced eastwards, on a line from Waterlot Farm north to Delville Wood on the Guillemont–Longueval road, the objective being Ginchy Telegraph, site of an old semaphore station on the highest ground east of the village. The ground over which the attack was to pass was overlooked by Ale Alley and Hop Alley, German positions at the east end of Delville Wood. Bombers from the 91st Brigade and part of the 22nd Brigade attacked the German positions on the northern flank five minutes before zero, with support from a 24th Division battalion on the left. The British bombardment increased at 10:25 a.m. and at 11:20 a.m. became intense.

A creeping barrage was arranged to begin at zero hour (noon) and dwell for five minutes, so that the infantry could close up to the German front line 400 yd (370 m) away, then creep forward in three lifts through Ginchy. The bombers advanced towards Hop Alley at 11:55 a.m. but smoke from their fumite grenades alerted the Germans and the 24th Division battalion attacked late, after it received contradictory orders. The eastern edge of Delville Wood up to Hop Alley was captured but the German defenders pinned down the rest of the attacking force, when it tried to advance by moving in the open and by bombing along trenches.

At noon the main attack began and the right-hand battalion advanced into the south of Ginchy out of view, as the left-hand battalion was caught in flanking fire by the German machine-guns in Ale Alley. Part of the battalion got into the north end of Ginchy and also disappeared, while the rest occupied the southern part of Beer Trench or dug in 40 yd (37 m) short of Hop Alley. A supporting company got a few men into the orchards north-west of Ginchy and were joined by part of another battalion, originally intended to occupy Ale Alley as a defensive flank. On the right flank it was reported at 3:50 p.m. that the far side of the village had been reached and the eastern and south-eastern outskirts were being consolidated.

Germans in the north end of the village then worked round the open left flank and counter-attacked, pushing the survivors back to Porter Trench, except for a party which held on to a position on the Guillemont road, at the boundary with XIV Corps. A new attack at 5:00 p.m. on the northern flank, from Pilsen Lane against Hop Alley was ordered at 2:15 p.m. and extended south to recapture Ginchy, when it was seen to have been lost. The attack in the north failed, apart from some troops reaching the left side of Hop Alley and that on Ginchy was stopped by artillery and machine-gun fire at Stout and Porter trenches, where the survivors of the original attack were holding on.

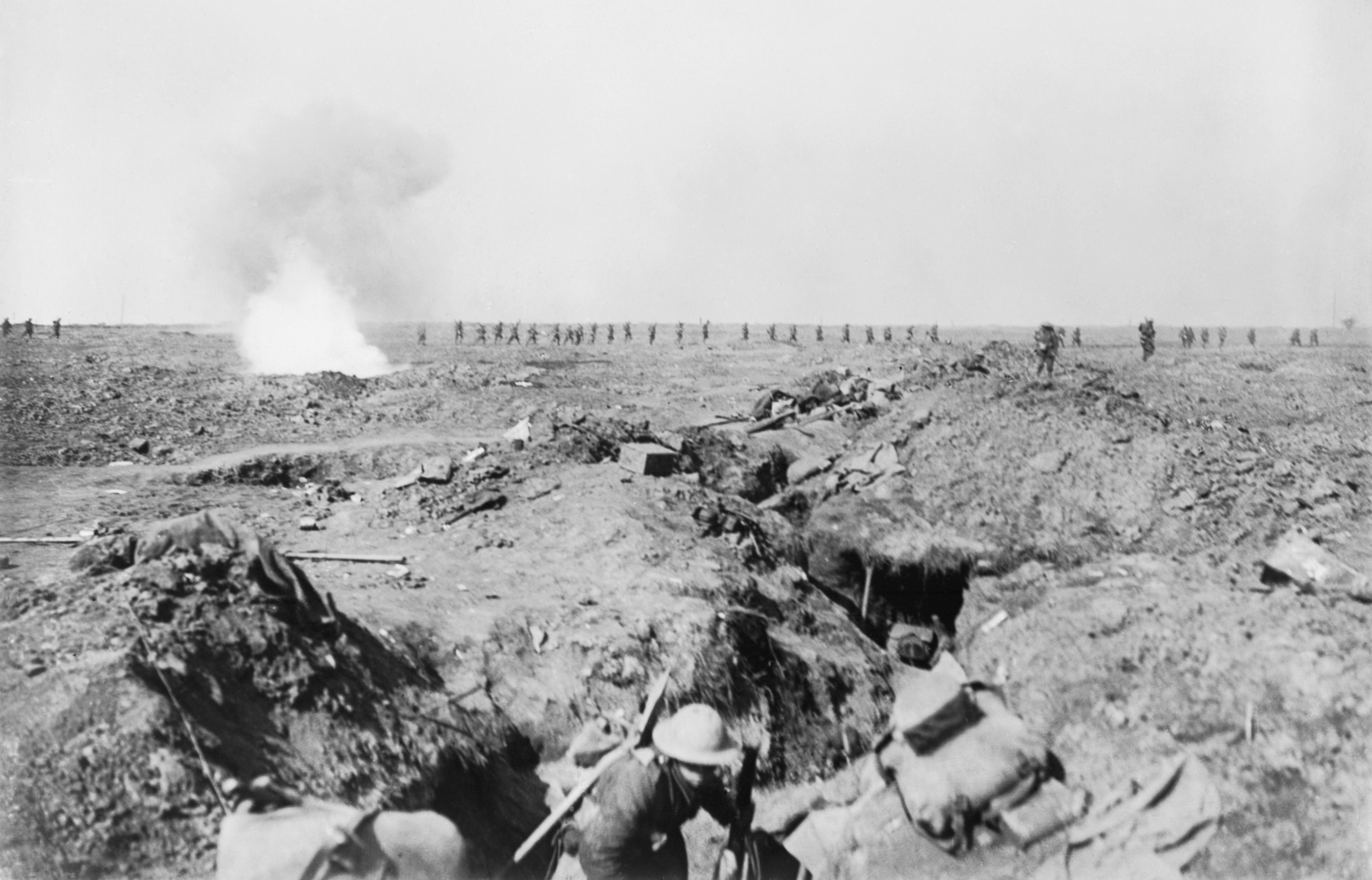
Troops advance, Battle of Ginchy

Heavy and accurate German artillery-fire had begun twenty minutes after zero hour and cut communication with the attacking battalions. Contact aircraft reported seeing flares in the village but received no response when more flares were called for. The 7th Division called on corps headquarters for another bombardment by heavy artillery at 6:50 p.m. and the divisional commander Major-General Herbert Watts, requested the use of the 20th Brigade for another attack.

Lieutenant-General Henry Horne, the corps commander referred this to Fourth Army headquarters, because the brigade was being conserved for the big attack planned for mid-September. Eventually the 20th Brigade was committed to hold the line and the 22nd Brigade ordered to attack again, despite its losses and disorganisation, until a patrol revealed that the Germans had infiltrated a large number of infantry in the village. The attack was cancelled and the 20th Brigade moved up by lorry to Mametz, to take over from Stout and Porter trenches to Delville Wood, ready to reinforce troops in Ginchy or to wait until morning to renew the attack, the attempt eventually taking place next day at 8:00 a.m.

The 20th Brigade attackers quickly occupied Ginchy, came under massed shrapnel-shell and machine-gun fire and was soon pushed back to ZZ, Porter and Stout trenches, west and south-west of the outskirts. The corps commander postponed another attack until 5 September, when a surprise attack was to be attempted. Further north the attack from Delville Wood began at 2:00 p.m. but made no progress beyond Ale Alley and Hop Alley; a later attempt on Hop Alley from Pilsen Lane also failed, the troops being pinned down in shell-holes until dusk. The 20th Brigade attack intended for 5 September was postponed, due to the state of the ground and disorganisation in the front line. Survivors from the 22nd Brigade reported that the village was held mainly by machine-gunners and recommended a night attack, for which a preliminary attack on the eastern fringe of Delville Wood, was made in the late afternoon. The attack reached the edge of the wood to a point north of Hop Alley, despite continuous German artillery-fire. In the early morning of 6 September, another attack on Ginchy began but lost direction in the dark.

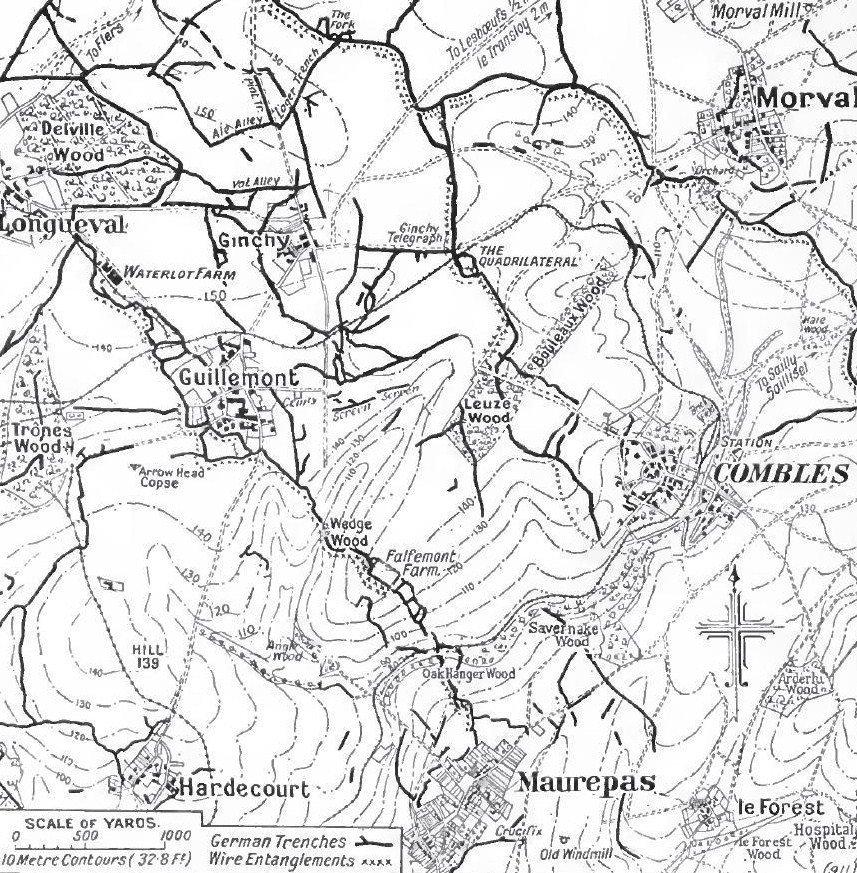
German defensive lines, vicinity of Delville Wood, Ginchy, Maurepas, Morval, July–September 1916

A second attack was made at 5:30 a.m. Despite deep mud the attackers reached the western outskirts of the village, before being stopped by German machine-gun fire at close range, from hides in the débris of the village. Attacks between Ginchy and Delville Wood pushed forward from Pilsen Lane, where some of the advanced parties were then pushed back by a counter-attack from Ginchy. After another bombardment at 2:00 p.m. the British attacked from the Guillemont–Ginchy road, behind a creeping barrage and reached the village, taking a number of prisoners, before being cut off by a German counter-barrage, attacked at 4:30 p.m. and pushed back to the original front line. The 7th Division commander reported that the division was incapable of another effort and no attack on Ginchy was made on 7 September. An attempt was made to capture the last part of Delville Wood, behind a rifle-grenade barrage which was repulsed.

On the right of XIV Corps, the 56th (1/1st London) Division attacked on 9 September at 4:45 p.m. A battalion of the 169th Brigade advanced from the south-east of Leuze Wood towards Loop Trench, to establish a defensive flank along the Combles ravine. German artillery and machine-gun fire forced the battalion back; another battalion was sent forward as reinforcements but took until 11:00 p.m. to find its way through German artillery-fire and the dark. A battalion attacking from inside Leuze Wood, managed to capture the main German line beyond the sunken road into Combles at Bouleaux Wood, then advance north-west to the Guillemont–Morval road, south-east of the Quadrilateral and dig in. (Note: The Quadrilateral was a rectangular trench 300 yd × 150 yd (270 m × 140 m) on a sunken part of the Ginchy–Morval road.)

The 168th Brigade advanced to the north-east, from south of the Leuze Wood–Guillemont road by pivoting on its right flank, intending to reach the German line from Leuze Wood to the Quadrilateral. The right-hand battalion hugged the barrage and reached its first objective easily about 300 yd (270 m) forward, despite small-arms raking the left flank battalion and only the company on the right reaching its first objective on the Leuze Wood–Ginchy road. The battalion on the right advanced again, when the barrage began to move forward at 5:25 p.m. to the final objective, at the German trench from the Quadrilateral to Bouleaux Wood. Despite many losses the objective was reached and consolidated, touch being gained with the left of the 169th Brigade and patrols pushed forward towards Morval. Small parties of German infantry were engaged by Lewis-gun fire in the gloom and driven off.

Weather (1–11 September 1916)
Day	Rain mm	°F	
1	0.0	72°–52°	–
2	0.0	75°–52°	wind
3	4	72°–50°	–
4	25	66°–52°	rain
5	0.0	63°–54°	dull
6	0.0	70°–52°	dull
7	0.0	70°–54°	fine
8	0.0	70°–55°	fine dull
9	5	75°–57°	–
10	1	68°–57°	dull
11	0.1	66°–54°	dull

The left battalion was pinned-down by fire from German positions south-east of Ginchy and the advance to the Quadrilateral stopped. Air reconnaissance of the Quadrilateral which lay in dead ground, had shown that its outer belt of barbed-wire had been cut by the British artillery but not wire covered by long grass for 60 yd (55 m) behind. A second attempt lost direction and veered to the right, as German artillery-fire and a thick mist at sunset cut off the attacking troops from communication to the rear. Troops had been brought forward to form a defensive flank on the left and after dark a battalion was sent to link the line left from the Quadrilateral, erroneously believed to have been captured, to Ginchy where troops of the 16th (Irish) Division were thought to be. The advance began at 12:15 a.m. but also got lost in the dark and mist. The German defence collapsed into confusion, with one party attacking the British from behind. As dawn broke some of the battalion found that they were at the trench south-east of the Quadrilateral.

The two 16th (Irish) Division brigades began the attack tired and worn down, after earlier attacks while attached to the 5th Division and 20th Division. The two attacking battalions of the 47th Brigade on the right flank were held back for two minutes after zero hour for a final hurricane bombardment. The 48th Brigade on the left attacked on schedule, which brought down a German counter-barrage. The battalions of the 47th Brigade were stopped by close-range machine-gun fire, most of the British bombardment having fallen on the German second line. Further attempts to advance with reinforcements also failed. North of the 47th Brigade, the battalion on the right side of the 48th Brigade was also stopped but wheeled, forced back the Germans in the vicinity and pressed on. The brigade advanced either side of the Guillemont–Ginchy road, against slight opposition and reached the first objective along Hans Crescent, on the western outskirts of Ginchy at 5:00 p.m. Two battalions leap-frogged through at 5:25 p.m. and took the village and 200 German prisoners, the rest withdrawing towards Flers and Lesbœufs.

Some of the Irish pursued the Germans, until they were recalled, to consolidate a defensive line around the eastern outskirts of Ginchy. Engineer field companies built a strongpoint on the road to Lesbœufs and one at the XIV Corps–XV Corps boundary on the Delville Wood road. On the right of XV Corps, an attack by 164th Brigade of the 55th Division captured the east end of Delville Wood and took Hop and Ale alleys but failed to hold them against German artillery and machine-gun fire. A camouflaged trench had been taken to be the objective for a few moments, causing a delay which proved disastrous. After advancing to within 20 yd (18 m) of Hop Alley, the few survivors withdrew to Pilsen Lane. Several German counter-attacks were made in the evening and repulsed.

=== Air operations ===
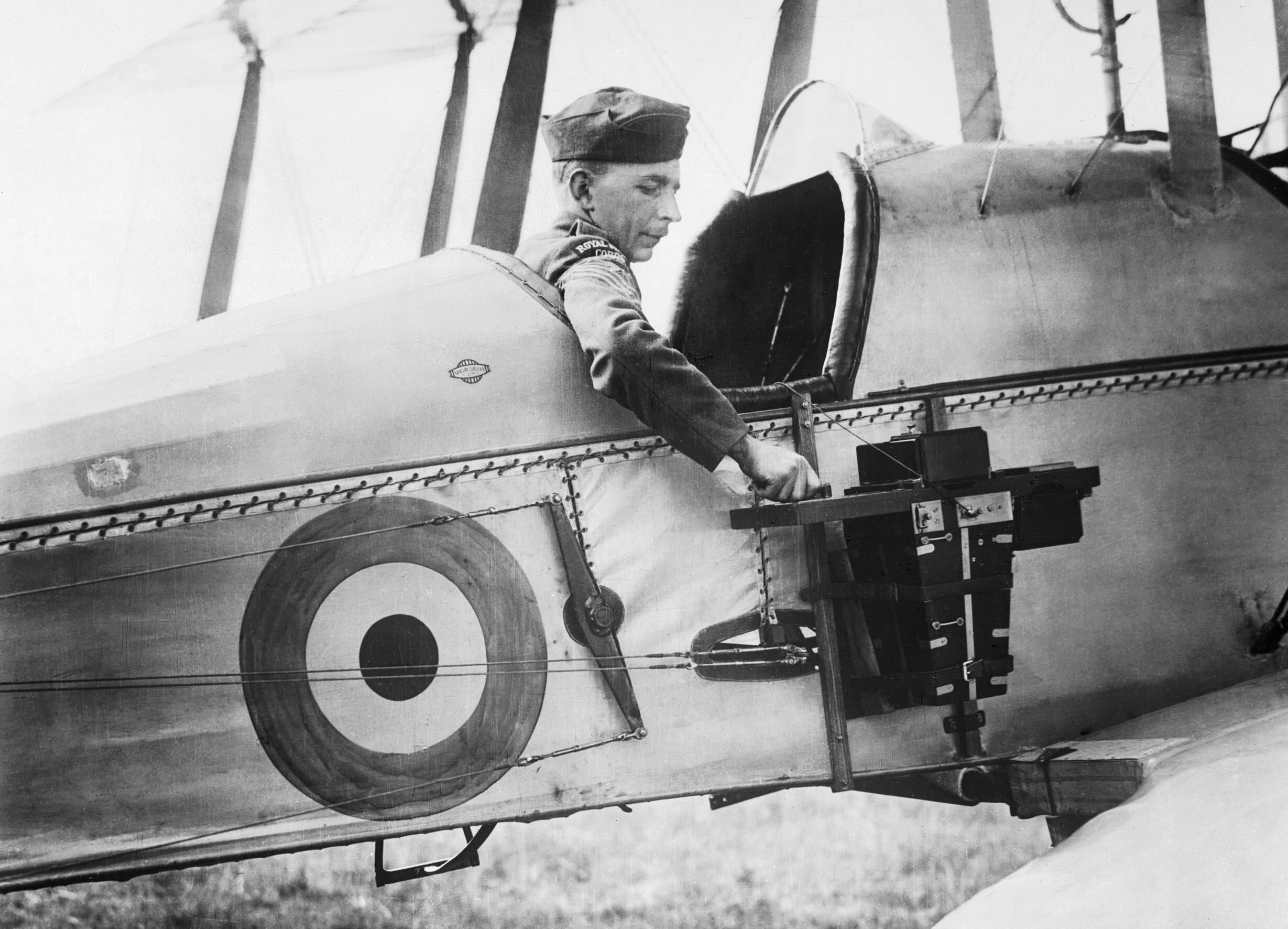
Air reconnaissance camera, operated by the pilot of a B.E.2c, 1916

On the evening of 6 July, German troops were spotted moving into Ginchy, by a 9 Squadron observer and were machine-gunned but a call for artillery-fire went unanswered. Later on more troops were seen and engaged by artillery, prisoners later stating that a battalion lost half its men. On 22 July, 9 Squadron observers reported that new digging was seen around Ginchy, part of a line of entrenchments from Combles to Gueudecourt. On 18 August, British artillery-fire was directed on Ginchy, again by 9 Squadron. On 3 September a reconnaissance flight by 3 Squadron over Ginchy reported no great mass of German infantry, the aeroplane was not fired on and huddled bodies were taken to be German dead.

Another aircraft flight took place during the attack and observed British infantry enter the village at 1:00 p.m., then saw the advance move through the centre of Ginchy towards the eastern edge. German troops north of the village and more troops moving down Lager Lane were machine-gunned by the aircraft, which also called for artillery-fire by wireless and observed the shells falling on the German positions. At 2:40 p.m. British troops were still visible at the east end of Ginchy but the German troops seen earlier managed to counter-attack at 3:00 p.m., despite the British artillery-fire and recapture the village up to the western outskirts. On 9 September the final attack on Ginchy began in a haze in the late afternoon, with three aircraft of 9 Squadron on contact-patrol over the area, which reported the progress of the attack.

=== German 1st Army ===
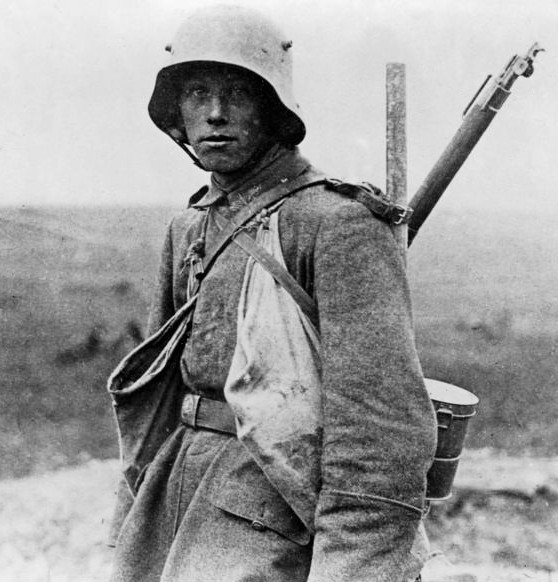
Sommekämpfer (Somme fighter)

The 4th Bavarian Division moved its left boundary to the Longueval–Flers road and the 56th (1/1st London) Division withdrew Infantry Regiment 88 (IR 88) into reserve, which became available to reinforce Fusilier Regiment 35 (FR 35) in Ginchy, which held the western edge of the village with I Battalion FR 35 and part of I Battalion, IR 88, until forced back by the British attack on 3 September. Parts of both battalions counter-attacked from Pint Trench at 3:30 p.m. as parts of I Battalion, IR 88 and III battalion, F R 35 advanced slowly through the south of the village to the south-eastern corner. Elements of both regiments attacked again at 6:00 p.m. and after hand-to-hand fighting recaptured the rest of the village but were not able to link with IR 76 to the south-west, which had been forced out of Guillemont.

A British attack at 8:00 a.m. was repulsed by small-arms fire, after signals to the German artillery went unanswered and I Battalion, F R 35 had many casualties defending Delville Wood to the west. On 6 September, the British attack got into Ginchy and took a number of prisoners, before being forced back out by a counter-attack at 4:30 p.m. by III Battalion, I R 88 and I Battalion, Reserve Infantry Regiment 104 (RIR 104) of the 24th Reserve Division, which had arrived as a reinforcement. Next day was relatively quiet and the 5th Bavarian Division began to relieve the 56th (1/1st London) Division, Bavarian Infantry Regiment 19 (BIR 19) taking over the defence of Ginchy amid considerable confusion caused by ignorance of the situation in the village, which had disappeared due to the effect of constant bombardment.

On 8 September, the men of I Battalion, I R 88 at the Entenschnabel (Duck's Bill), a former meadow in the area between Delville Wood and Ginchy, were subjected to Trommelfeuer (drumfire) which sent plumes of mud high into the air. Digging-in deeper revealed British corpses, whose decomposition fouled the atmosphere; British bodies were thrown forward of the German defences and German ones thrown into shell-holes behind. South-west of Ginchy, the 111th Division had been relieved by the 185th Division of the XII Reserve Corps on 7/8 September, on the left of the 5th Bavarian Division. Loop Trench was defended by III Battalion, RIR 28 which was reinforced by part of the II Battalion and I Battalion, IR 65 (in line to the south, defending Combles). Part of III Battalion was overrun in Leuze and Bouleaux woods, which was reinforced by part of I Battalion, RIR 28 and some ground was recaptured; contact with Infantry Regiment 161 (IR 161) towards Ginchy was lost temporarily. The left flank of IR 161 had been "demolished" by the British attack and reinforcements from IR 65, were only able to reach the railway north-west of Bouleaux Wood.

The area from Ginchy to Delville Wood was held by the 5th Bavarian Division, with I Battalion, BIR 19 from Ginchy to trenches west to Delville Wood and II Battalion, BIR 19 in support; touch with the 185th Division was maintained by patrols. The left of I Battalion, south-east of Ginchy held its ground, although contact with the rear was lost. Opposite Delville Wood, the British attack was defeated but a company in Ginchy was rolled up from the south and part of II Battalion was also pushed back. Attempts by the II Battalion to counter-attack from north of the village at 6:20 p.m. and 9:00 p.m. failed, the troops getting lost in the dark during the second attack. Next day at 7:25 a.m., the III Battalion, BIR 19 counter-attacked along the Ginchy–Lesbœufs road into a "terrible bombardment" and was stopped short of Ginchy. A report took until nightfall to reach the battalion headquarters. III Battalion, BIR 19 then counter-attacked again into massed artillery and machine-gun fire; part of the battalion penetrated Ginchy, where they were overwhelmed.

== Aftermath ==
=== Analysis ===
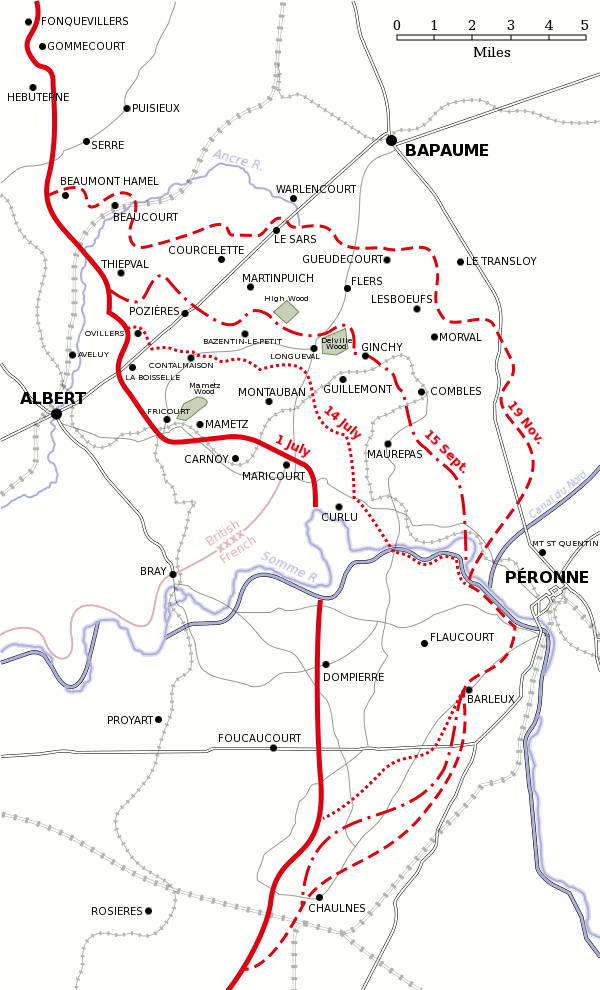
Somme situation map

Crown Prince Rupprecht wrote later that the confusion in Ginchy had been caused by two divisions having responsibility for the defence of the village. The hurried relief of the defenders and lack of organisation at the divisional boundary, enabled a British battalion to find its way in small groups through a gap between German units and get round the flank of the 5th Bavarian Division, forcing it to withdraw. Counter-attacks were said to have failed, because the English (sic) had defended Ginchy with few men but many machine-guns, dug-in around the fringes of the village, which stopped the German counter-attacks short of the village. A final attempt failed on 11 September, leaving Bavarian Infantry Regiment 19 with losses of 884 men. Franco-British attacks in September caused a crisis in the German defence and by 5 to 6 September, many German infantry units were at the end of their endurance.

It had taken the Fourth Army from 15 July to 14 September to advance 1,000 yd (910 m) on a 5 mi (8.0 km) front and cost 82,000 casualties but capture of the ground north of Ginchy gained the British another 3,000 yd (1.7 mi; 2.7 km) of the crest from Leuze Wood to Delville Wood, which overlooked the German third position for 9,000 yd (5.1 mi; 8.2 km), from Delville Wood to Mouquet Farm. On 11 September, Gallwitz wrote that if the process continued, Germany would run out of men and equipment and that the British heavy guns were destroying the German artillery. The 4th Bavarian Division at Flers, reported that the loss of Ginchy exposed the area from Flers to Martinpuich to attack. British and French prisoners had said that in the recent attacks, German artillery-fire had begun too late and that attacks had caught Germans while they were still under cover in dugouts and also managed to overrun troops further back, held ready to counter-attack.

Prior & Wilson wrote that Guillemont had eventually been captured, using improved tactics but that the 7th Division attacked Ginchy with insufficient weight, seeking to keep troops fresh for the big offensive planned for mid-September. Insufficient attention was paid to mopping-up captured ground, German troops hiding in village cellars were overlooked and the artillery failed to suppress German machine-gunners firing from the flanks. The same form of attack was repeated until the 7th Division was relieved by the 16th (Irish) Division, which moved into line just as the weather deteriorated and rain turned the ground to mud. It was possible to attack Ginchy from the south once Guillemont had fallen and six battalions (albeit tired and depleted by losses) attacked instead of two in previous attacks. A stroke of ill-luck left the Germans in Ginchy unsupported, when the Irish attacked with twice as much field artillery than the previous attacks and took the village in two hours.

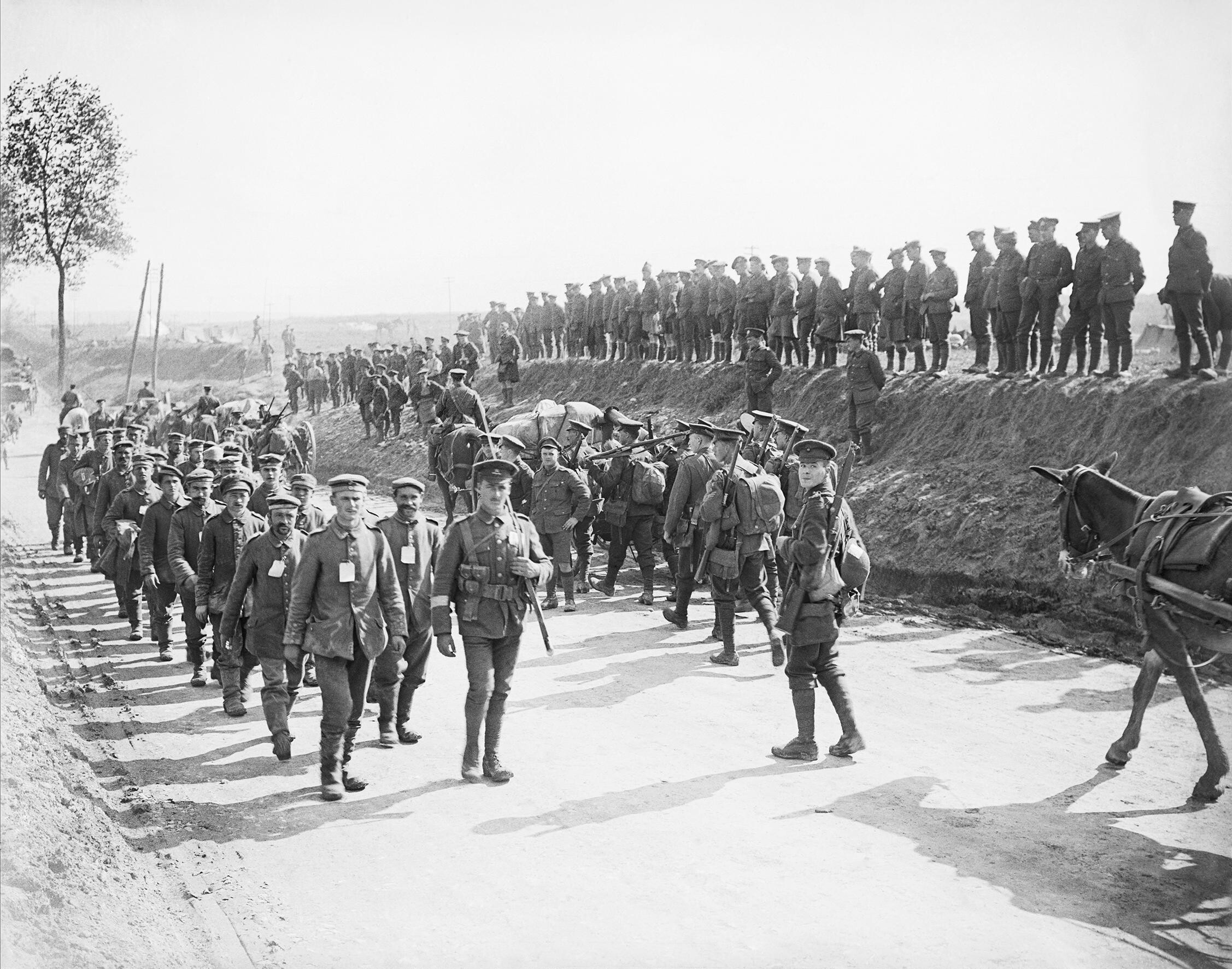
German prisoners taken at Ginchy

In the 7th Division history, Charles Atkinson, called the attacks on Ginchy most unsatisfactory, despite having plenty of artillery and ammunition in support. The fighting in Delville Wood in the aftermath of the big German counter-attack of 31 August had depleted the division; some of the lost ground in the wood had not been recaptured, which left the Germans well placed to enfilade attacks towards Ginchy from the west and north. Atkinson claimed that fighting for the village covered the left flank of the troops further south attacking Guillemont and absorbed German reinforcements in the area. The 7th Division had been used in "driblets", when a co-ordinated attack on a broader front may have succeeded. There had been insufficient time to rest troops, who were poorly trained, led by inexperienced NCOs and the "musketry" of many of the men from recent drafts was inadequate.

J. P. Harris described British efforts between 15 July and 14 September, a "dissolution" and that the large number of piecemeal attacks demonstrate a failure of command, primarily by Haig. He suggested that the British could have established an army group level of command, similar to those in the French and German armies. (Note: From mid-July the German 2nd Army had been split and a new 1st Army commanded by Below established on the north side of the Somme, both under the command of General Max von Gallwitz, an artillery specialist brought in from Verdun.) Despite criticism of British methods and results, Harris noted that things were worse for the Germans, who were deluged by British artillery, directed by "ubiquitous" Royal Flying Corps (RFC) observers overhead. German troops made seventy counter-attacks against ninety British attacks from 15 July to 14 September, most of which were costly failures, were too frequent and wasted troops on insignificant objectives.

Jack Sheldon wrote in 2005, that the defence of Ginchy had driven some of the best German regiments close to collapse. The commander of the 10th Company, Infantry Regiment 88 wrote a report to the battalion commander on 5 September, that if the company was not withdrawn, he could not answer for the consequences. The report was endorsed and forwarded by the battalion commander but the company was required to counter-attack at Ginchy on 6 September, before being relieved. In contrast to the criticism from Joffre and Foch at the time and by writers and historians since, that the British in this period conducted too many narrow-front attacks, which conceded a tactical advantage to the Germans, Dudley Ward in the 56th (1/1st London) Division history, noted that broad-front attacks were futile when delivered with insufficient weight, since troops edged away from return fire and moved through gaps in defences, bypassing German infantry who could cut them off from reinforcements and supplies.

=== Casualties ===
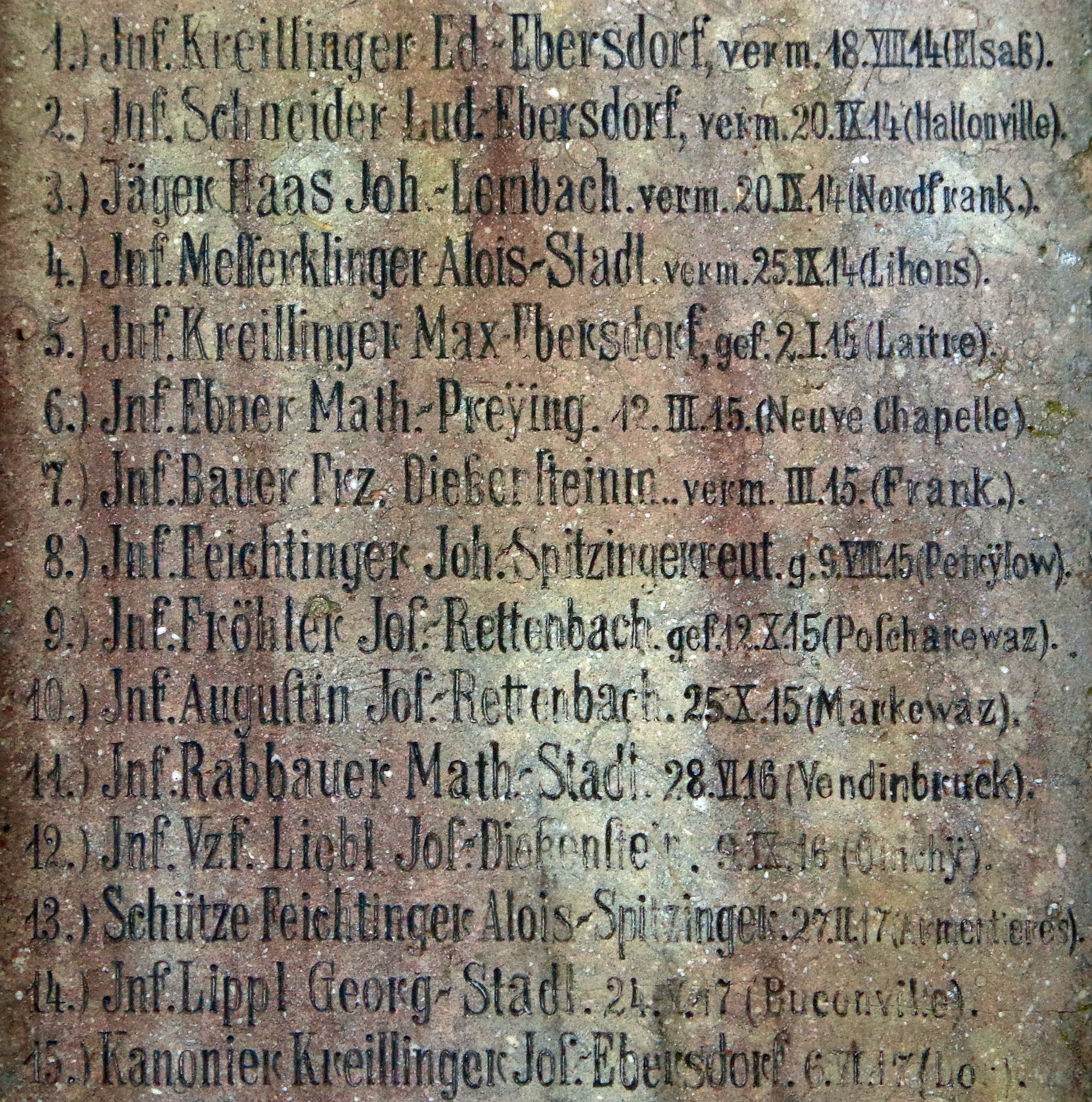
Detail of the war memorial in the village of Preying (Saldenburg, Bavaria) naming Infantry Vizefeldwebel Josef Liebl who was killed during the Battle of Ginchy, 9 September 1916.

From 7 to 12 September, Bavarian Infantry Regiment 19 lost 884 men in the defence of Ginchy. The 16th Irish Division suffered 4,330 casualties from 1 to 10 September and was transferred to the Second Army in Flanders. From 23 August to its relief on 7 September, the 7th Division suffered 3,800 casualties. The 24th Division had suffered approximately 2,000 casualties since the end of August.

=== Subsequent operations ===
Attacks were made from the Guillemont–Combles and the Guillemont–Ginchy roads to reach the Quadrilateral, a rectangular trench 300 yd × 150 yd (270 m × 140 m) on a sunken part of the Ginchy–Morval road, which was one of the preliminary objectives of the Fourth Army, before the big offensive planned for 15 September. The 16th (Irish) Division was relieved by the Guards Division on the night of 9/10 September, from the edge of Leuze Wood along the Ginchy road to Ginchy, as the British hold on Ginchy was consolidated. Next day the 56th (1/1st London) Division attacked south-east from Leuze Wood at 7:00 a.m. but was stopped by machine-gun fire from Loop Trench and the sunken road into Combles; a second attempt at 3:00 p.m. also failed. Operations began to capture Ginchy Telegraph and the Quadrilateral on the Ginchy–Morval road, at the top of the Ginchy–Morval spur. (Note: The site of a French Revolutionary War semaphore station on the highest ground east of the village.) An attempt to bomb up to the Quadrilateral from Bouleaux Wood also failed in the face of German machine-gun fire. A brigade from the 5th Division began to relieve units of the 56th (1/1st London) Division and the Guards Division defeated German attempts to re-capture Ginchy.

Ginchy Telegraph was attacked by the Guards Division on 12 September at 6:00 a.m. along the Morval road, as the 56th (1/1st London) Division attacked towards the Quadrilateral again and the 6th Division began to relieve the left flank of the 56th (1/1st London) and right flank of the Guards divisions. Next day the 6th Division had taken over from Leuze Wood to the edge of Ginchy and attacked the Quadrilateral from the south-west, reaching the Leuze Wood–Ginchy road before being held up by machine-gun fire. A second attempt at 6:00 p.m. failed with 521 casualties in the two attacking battalions. An attack by the Guards at the north end of Ginchy straightened the line and an attack after dark was made on German machine-gun nests along the road to Morval. On 14 September a battalion of the 56th (1/1st London) Division dug assembly trenches south of Leuze Wood parallel to Combles Trench, preparatory to the Battle of Flers-Courcelette (15 to 22 September). The Quadrilateral was captured by the 6th Division on 18 September.
