= Wollaberg =

- Ortsteil of Jandelsbrunn
- Interactive map of Wollaberg
- Location within Germany Location within Bavaria
- Coordinates: 48°43′20.11″N 13°40′18.34″E
- Country: Germany
- State: Bavaria
- Admin. region: Niederbayern
- District: Freyung-Grafenau
- Municipality: Jandelsbrunn
- Elevation: 769 m (2,523 ft)

Population (2006-12-31)
  - Total: 500
- Time zone: UTC+01:00 (CET)
  - Summer (DST): UTC+02:00 (CEST)
- Postal codes: 94118
- Dialling codes: 08581
- Vehicle registration: FRG
- Website: www.wollaberg.de

Wollaberg is a small town in the district of Freyung-Grafenau in Bavaria in Germany.

== Geography ==
Wollaberg is situated in the southern Bavarian Forest, near the borders with the Czech Republic and Austria, and not far from Passau, often referred to as the gateway to the Bavarian Forest. It lies at an elevation of 769 metres above sea level and has a population of around 500 inhabitants.

Wollaberg is one of seven designated “artists’ villages” in the region, and the local population is predominantly Catholic.

== History ==
=== Theories behind the name Wollaberg ===
There are several theories for the name Wollaberg.

The name Wollaberg may point to a Roman origin because the local Teuton inhabitants called the Romans Walschen or Walchen. This hypothesis was proposed by Georg Brand, pastor in Wollaberg from 1893 to 1903. However, Wollaberg is situated outside the boundaries of the former Roman Empire. Perhaps scattered Romans settled here when the Roman Empire collapsed.

Alternatively, Wollaberg could come from wallern (wallfahren), which one can rather assume. Probably already in the 12th century a little church stood on the Wollaberg. Freyung church bills mention pilgrimages since 1591 and especially in the year of plague 1599 "when they went to Wallenperg".

Another theory was pursued by Wollaberg-born prelate Dr. Schmöller. He considered that Wollaberg was formed from the surrounding villages around 1257, because at that time this area was given by the Bishop of Passau, Otto von Lonsdorf, as a fief to the nearby castles to pay his war debt. Therefore, the owners of these castles tried as soon as possible to settle in this area in order to gain income themselves from tithes and rents.
