= Hohenau (disambiguation) =

Hohenau is a municipality in Bavaria, Germany.

Hohenau may also refer to:

- Hohenau, Paraguay, a town in Paraguay
- Hohenau an der March, a municipality in Lower Austria, Austria
- Hohenau an der Raab, a municipality in Styria, Austria
