= Fürsteneck =

- Municipality
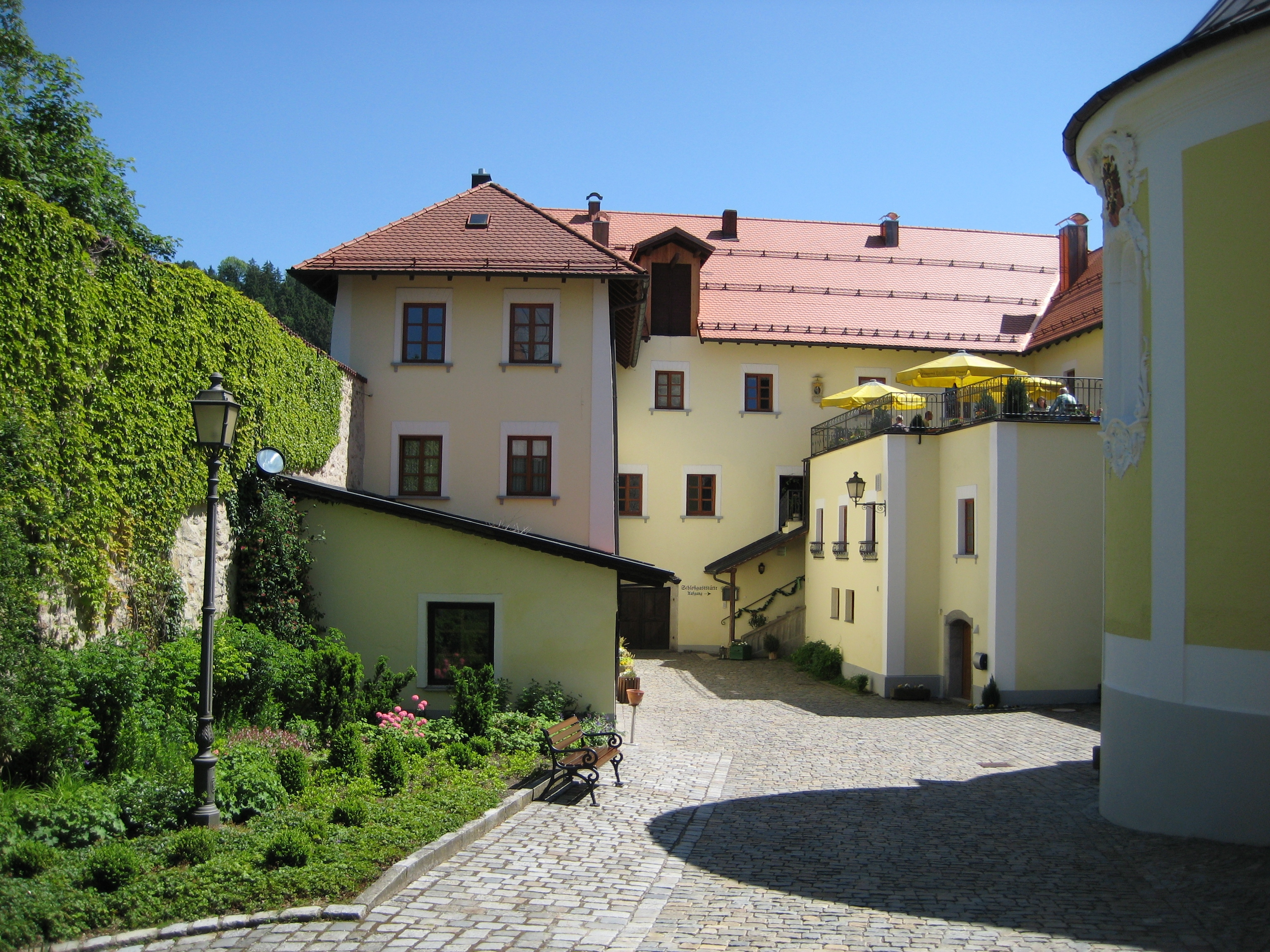
- Fürsteneck Castle

- Coat of arms

- Location of Fürsteneck within Freyung-Grafenau district
- Interactive map of Fürsteneck
- Location within Germany Location within Bavaria
- Coordinates: 48°43′N 13°28′E
- Country: Germany
- State: Bavaria
- Admin. region: Niederbayern
- District: Freyung-Grafenau
- Municipal assoc.: Perlesreut

Government
  - Mayor (2020–26): Alexander Pieringer (CSU)

Area
  - Total: 10.42 km^{2} (4.02 sq mi)
- Elevation: 336–638 m (1,102–2,093 ft)

Population (2025-12-31)
  - Total: 817
  - Density: 78.4/km^{2} (203/sq mi)
- Time zone: UTC+01:00 (CET)
  - Summer (DST): UTC+02:00 (CEST)
- Postal codes: 94142
- Dialling codes: 08555
- Vehicle registration: FRG
- Website: www.fuersteneck.de

Fürsteneck is a municipality in the district of Freyung-Grafenau in Bavaria in Germany.
