= Perlesreut (Verwaltungsgemeinschaft) =

- Verwaltungsgemeinschaft
- Location of Perlesreut within Freyung-Grafenau district
- Interactive map of Perlesreut
- Location within Germany Location within Bavaria
- Coordinates: 48°47′N 13°27′E
- Country: Germany
- State: Bavaria
- Admin. region: Lower Bavaria
- District: Freyung-Grafenau
- Seat: Perlesreut
- Subdivisions: 2 municipalities

Area
  - Total: 40.16 km^{2} (15.51 sq mi)

Population (2025-12-31)
  - Total: 3,646
  - Density: 90.79/km^{2} (235.1/sq mi)
- Time zone: UTC+01:00 (CET)
  - Summer (DST): UTC+02:00 (CEST)
- Website: www.perlesreut.de

Perlesreut is a Verwaltungsgemeinschaft (municipal association) in the district Freyung-Grafenau in Bavaria, Germany. Its seat is in Perlesreut.

It consists of the following municipalities:

1. Fürsteneck
2. Perlesreut
