= Schönberg, Lower Bavaria =

Schönberg
- Municipality
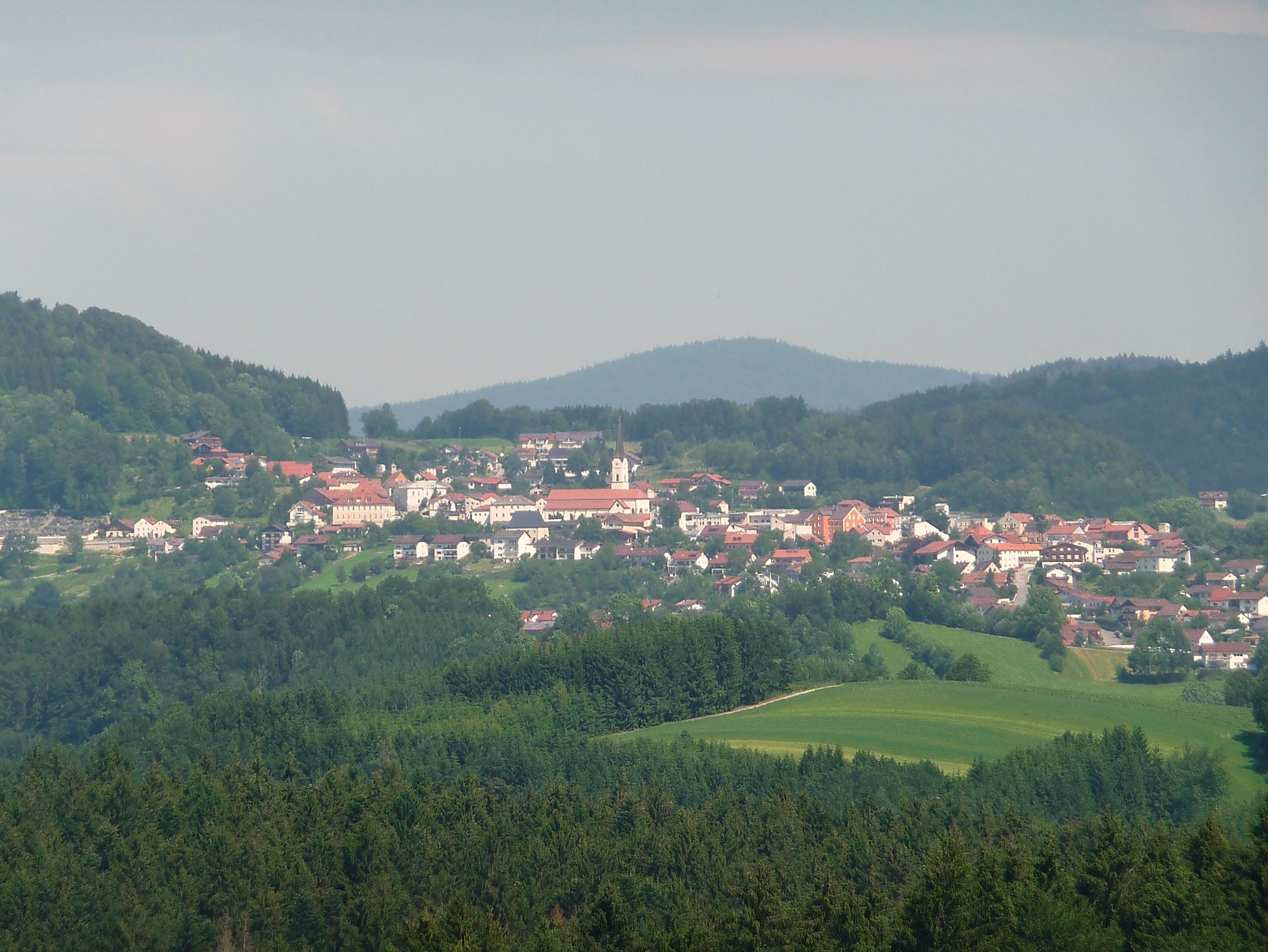
- Schönberg

- Coat of arms

- Location of Schönberg within Freyung-Grafenau district
- Interactive map of Schönberg
- Location within Germany Location within Bavaria
- Coordinates: 48°50′N 13°20′E
- Country: Germany
- State: Bavaria
- Admin. region: Niederbayern
- District: Freyung-Grafenau
- Municipal assoc.: Schönberg

Government
  - Mayor (2020–26): Martin Pichler (CSU)

Area
  - Total: 32.75 km^{2} (12.64 sq mi)
- Elevation: 563 m (1,847 ft)

Population (2025-12-31)
  - Total: 3,912
  - Density: 119.5/km^{2} (309.4/sq mi)
- Time zone: UTC+01:00 (CET)
  - Summer (DST): UTC+02:00 (CEST)
- Postal codes: 94513
- Dialling codes: 08554
- Vehicle registration: FRG
- Website: www.markt-schoenberg.de

Schönberg (German pronunciation: [ˈʃøːnbɛʁk]; Central Bavarian: Schembeag) is a municipality in the district of Freyung-Grafenau in Bavaria in Germany.
