= Perlesreut =

- Municipality
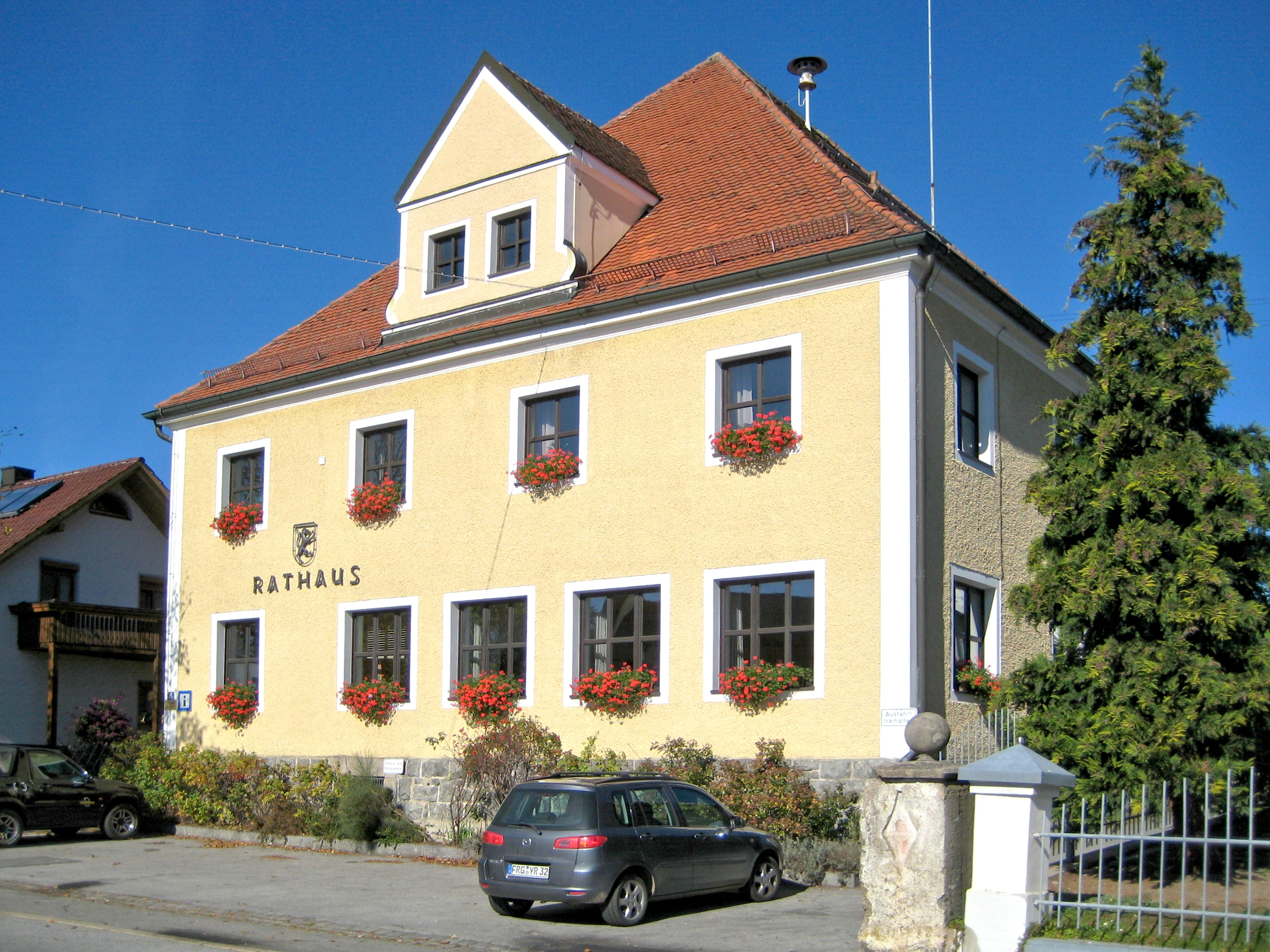
- Town hall

- Coat of arms

- Location of Perlesreut within Freyung-Grafenau district
- Interactive map of Perlesreut
- Location within Germany Location within Bavaria
- Coordinates: 48°47′N 13°27′E
- Country: Germany
- State: Bavaria
- Admin. region: Niederbayern
- District: Freyung-Grafenau
- Municipal assoc.: Perlesreut

Government
  - Mayor (2019–25): Gerhard Poschinger (CSU)

Area
  - Total: 29.71 km^{2} (11.47 sq mi)
- Elevation: 380–637 m (1,247–2,090 ft)

Population (2025-12-31)
  - Total: 2,829
  - Density: 95.22/km^{2} (246.6/sq mi)
- Time zone: UTC+01:00 (CET)
  - Summer (DST): UTC+02:00 (CEST)
- Postal codes: 94157
- Dialling codes: 08555
- Vehicle registration: FRG
- Website: www.perlesreut.de

Perlesreut is a municipality in the district of Freyung-Grafenau in Bavaria in Germany.
