= Neuschönau =

- Municipality
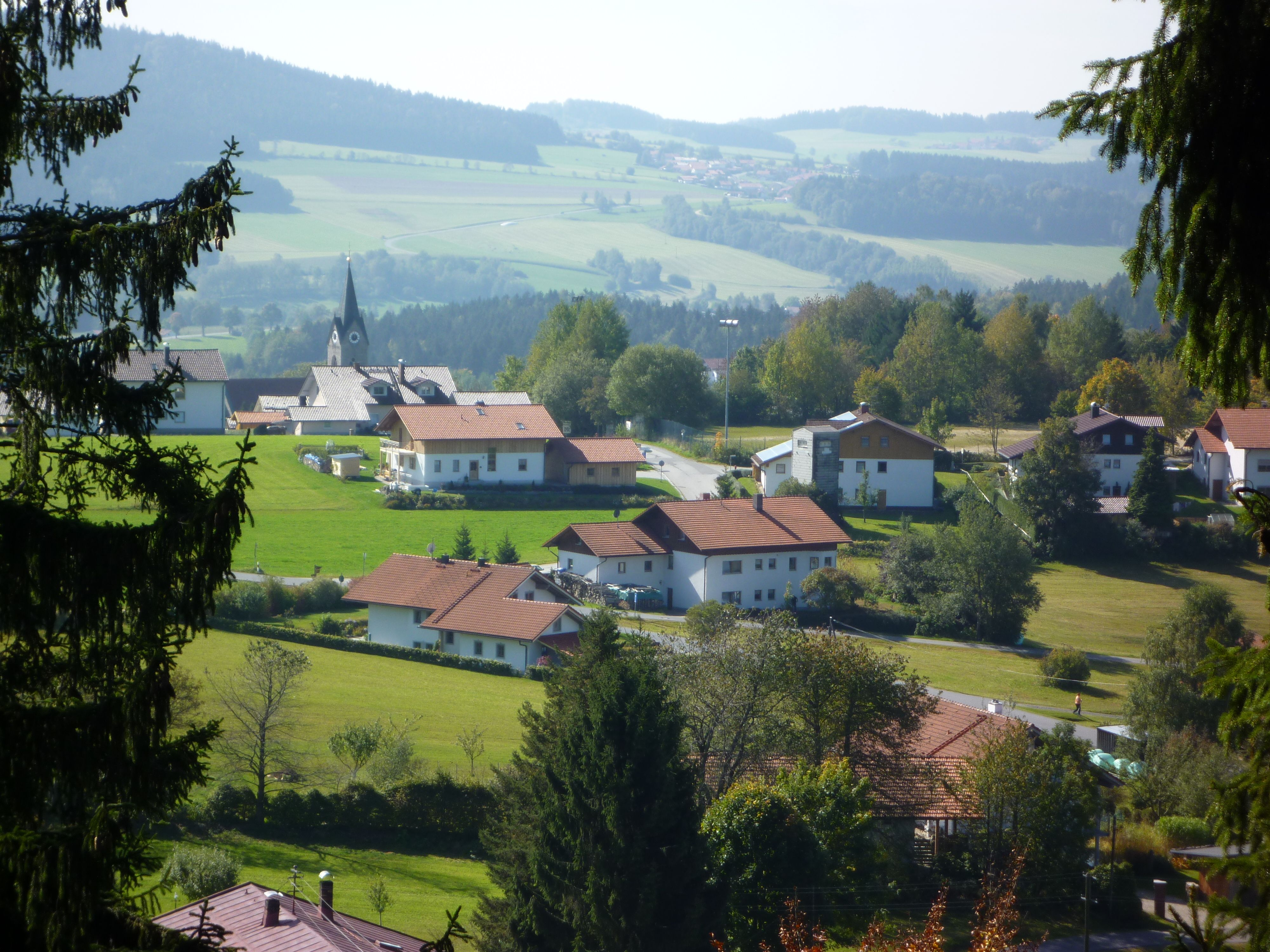
- Panorama of Neuschönau Municipality.

- Coat of arms

- Location of Neuschönau within Freyung-Grafenau district
- Interactive map of Neuschönau
- Location within Germany Location within Bavaria
- Coordinates: 48°53′04″N 13°28′40″E
- Country: Germany
- State: Bavaria
- Admin. region: Niederbayern
- District: Freyung-Grafenau

Government
  - Mayor (2020–26): Alfons Schinabeck (CSU)

Area
  - Total: 27.54 km^{2} (10.63 sq mi)
- Elevation: 650–1,350 m (2,130–4,430 ft)

Population (2025-12-31)
  - Total: 2,193
  - Density: 79.63/km^{2} (206.2/sq mi)
- Time zone: UTC+01:00 (CET)
  - Summer (DST): UTC+02:00 (CEST)
- Postal codes: 94556
- Dialling codes: 08558, 08552 (Altschönau)
- Vehicle registration: FRG
- Website: www.neuschoenau.de

Neuschönau (pronounced [ˈnɔʏˌʃøːnaʊ], lit. 'New Schönau', in contrast to "Old Schönau") is a municipality in the district of Freyung-Grafenau, in the Lower Bavaria region of Bavaria, in Germany.

== Points of interest ==
- Botanischer Garten der Nationalpark Bayerischer Wald — botanical garden.
- Lusen National Park Centre
  - Baumwipfelpfad Neuschönau — tall contemporary wooden tower, with a spiral ramp for treetop walking.
  - Hans-Eisenmann-Haus — visitor centre.

== Gallery ==
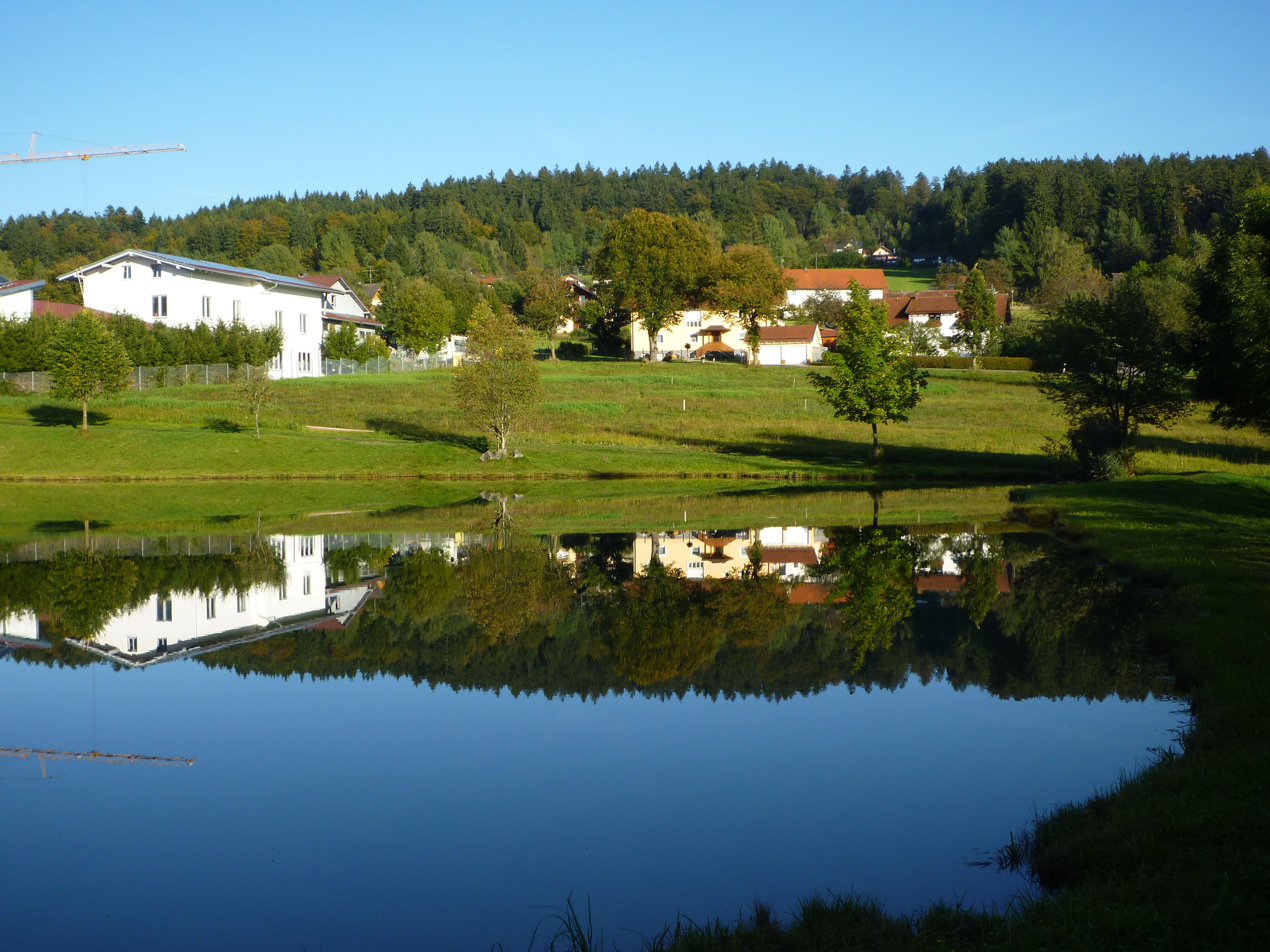
Panorama of Neuschönau Municipality.

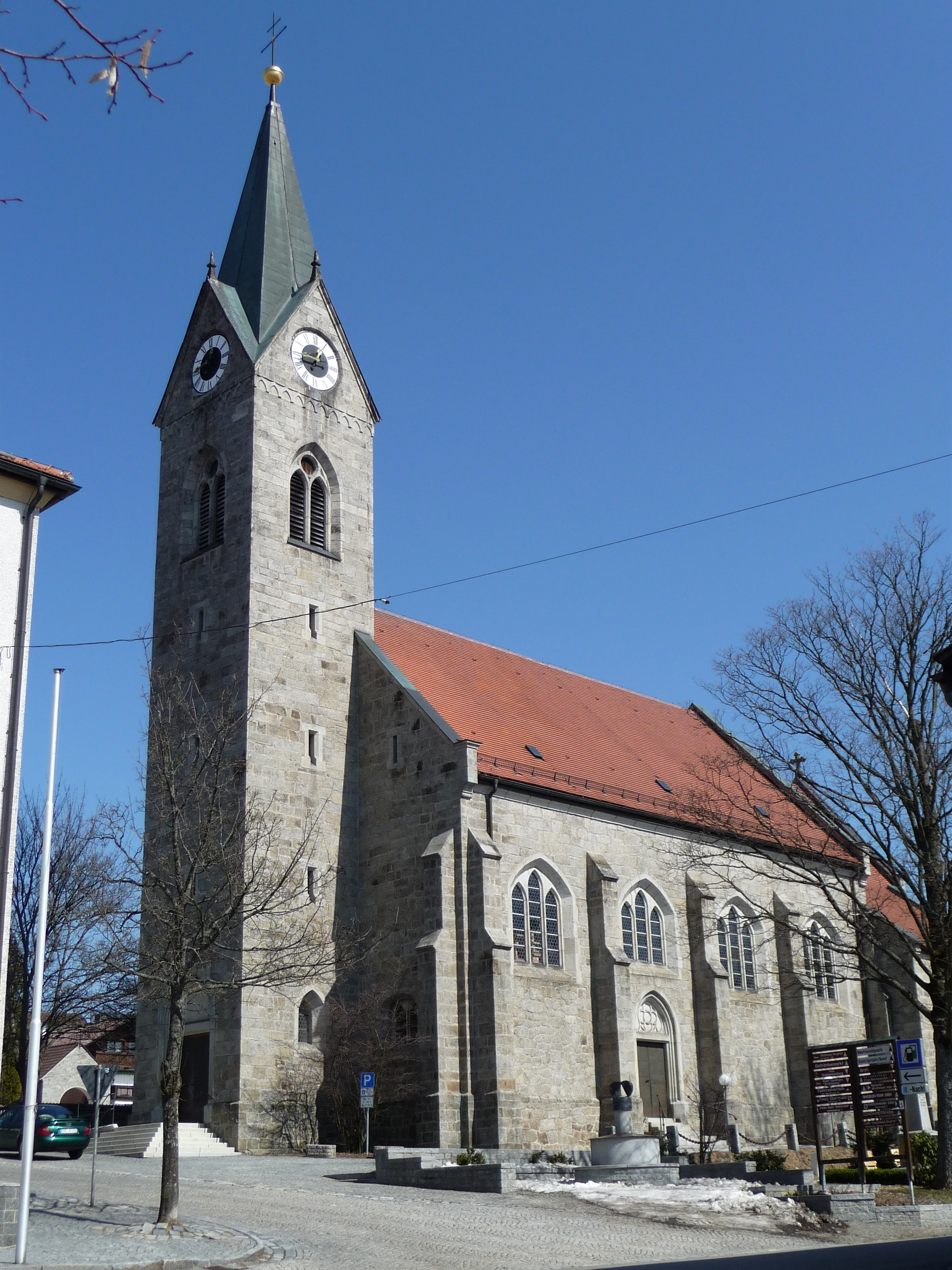
Saint Anne parish church, Neuschönau — a Cultural Heritage monument.

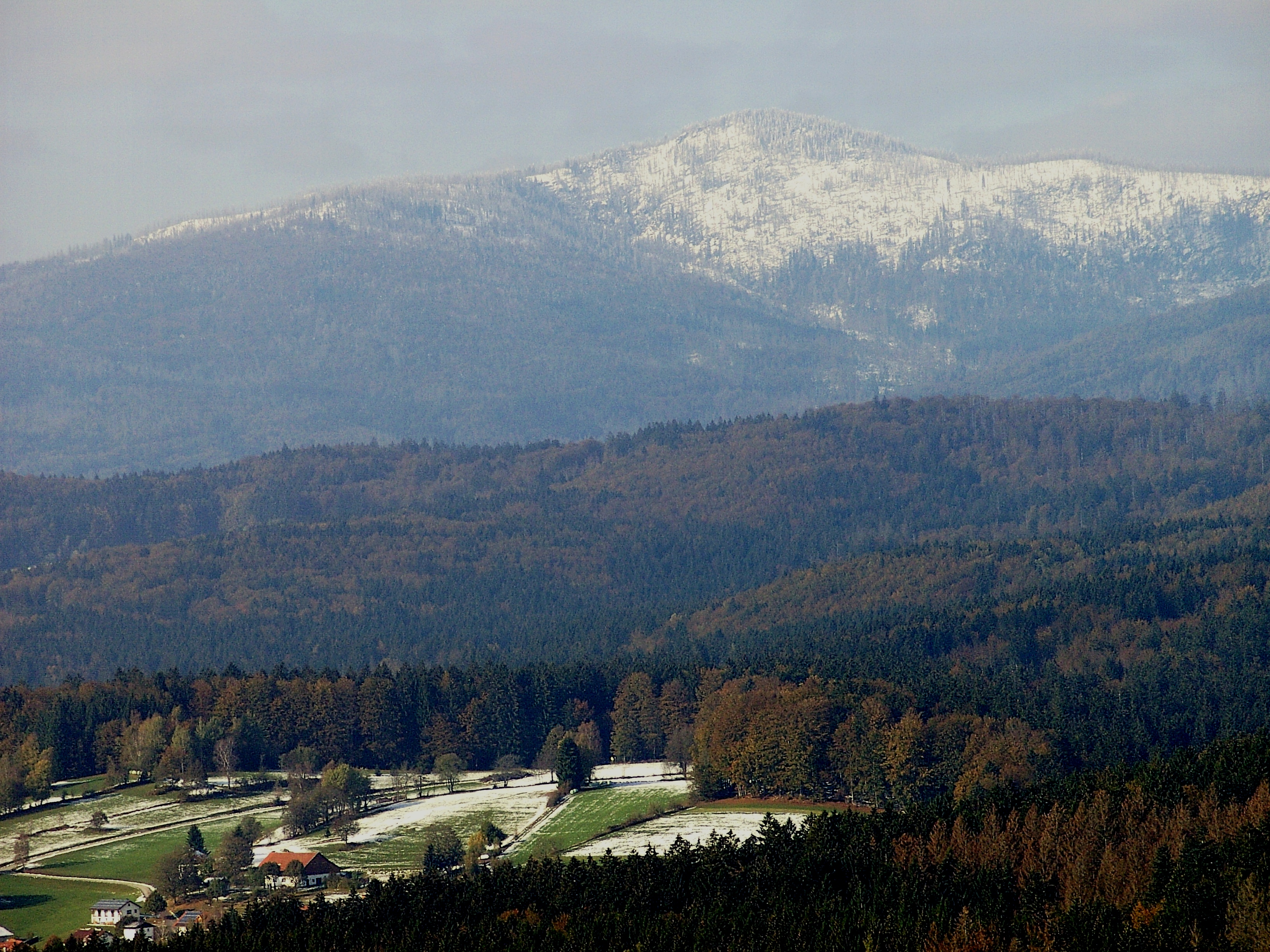
Panorama of Neuschönau Municipality: mountain Großer Rachel

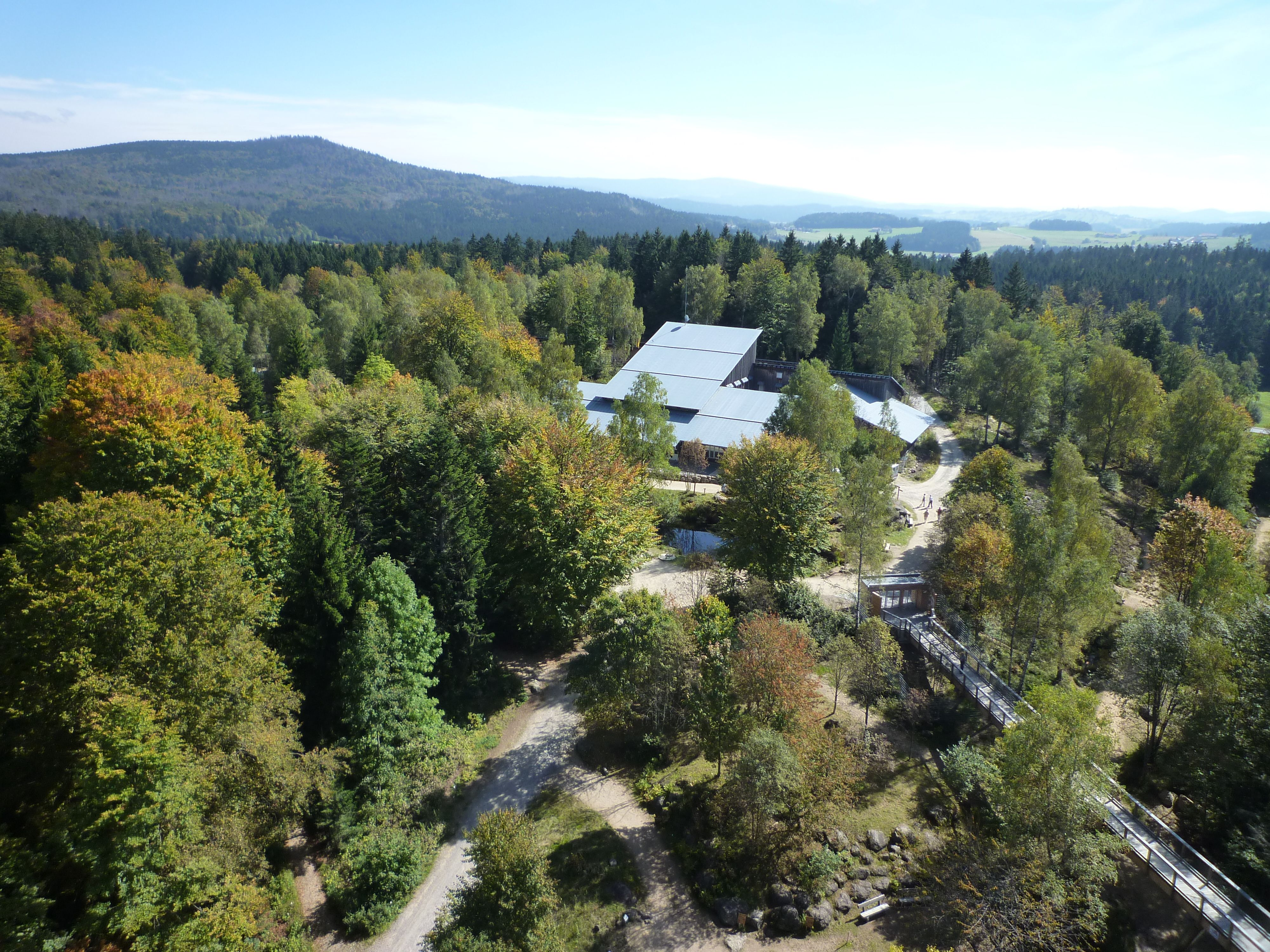
Hans-Eisenmann-Haus visitor centre, footbridge to Baumwipfelpfad Neuschönau (right).

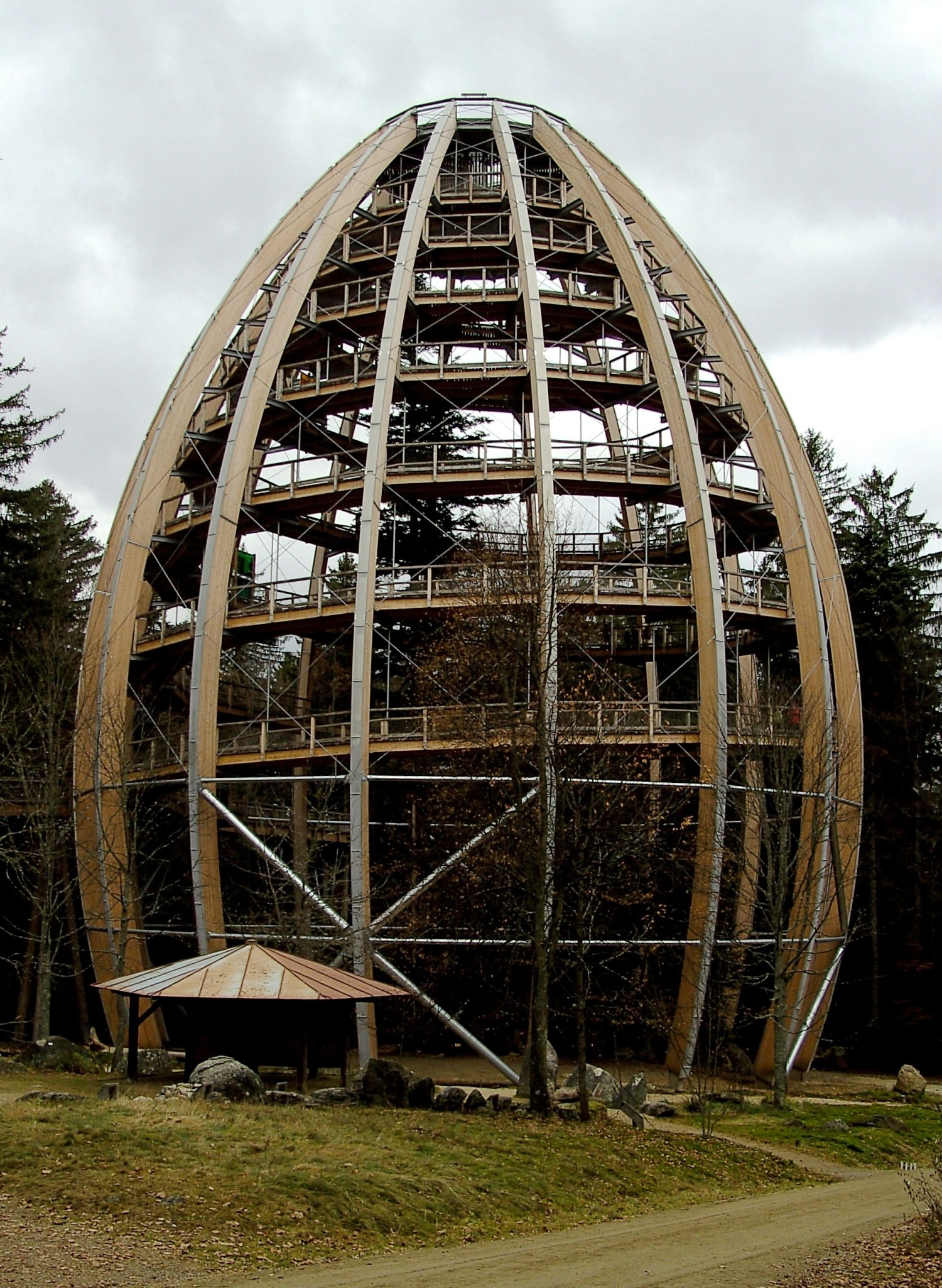
Baumwipfelpfad Neuschönau — wooden tower profile.

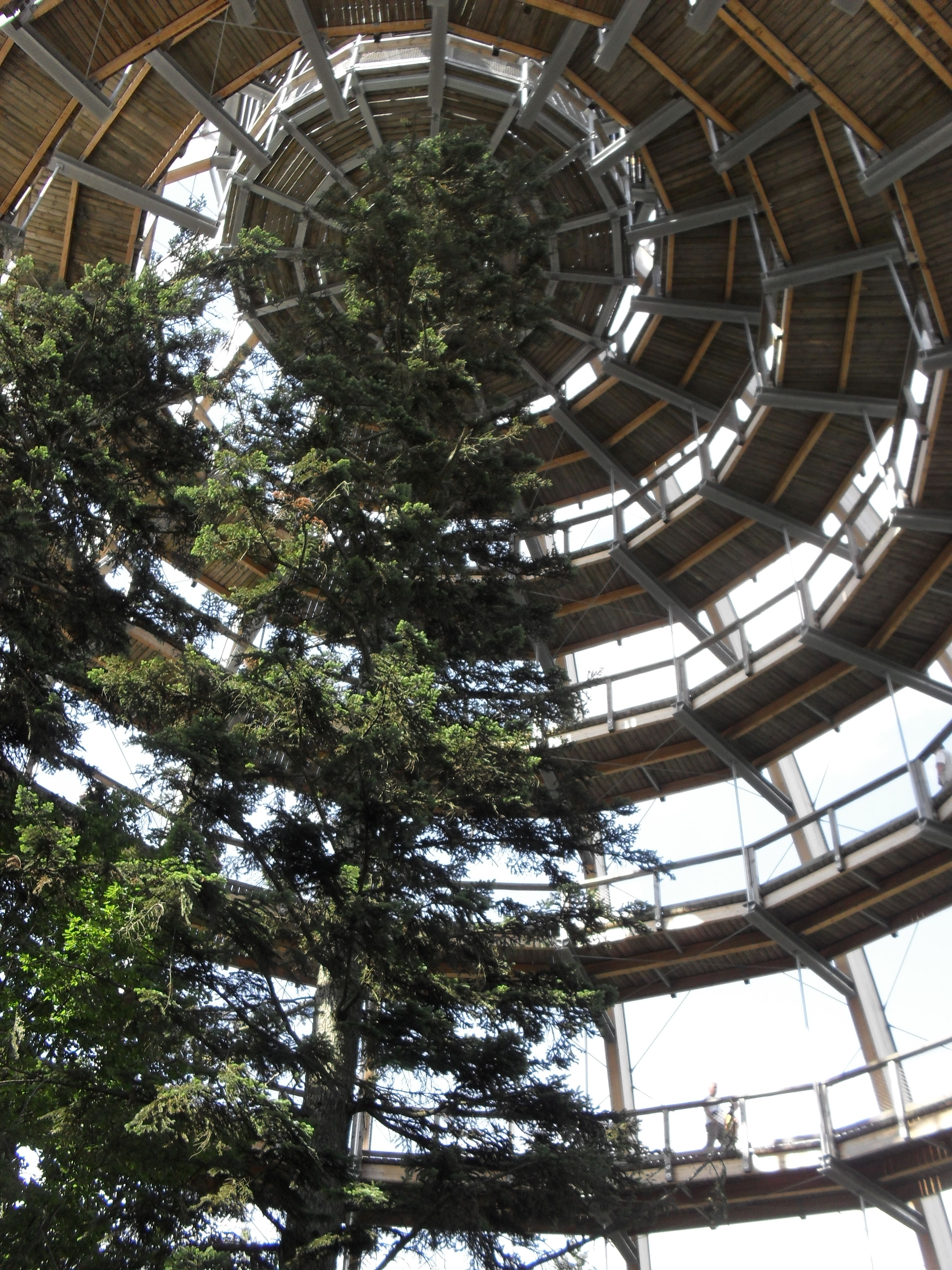
Baumwipfelpfad Neuschönau — walkway ramps into the tree tops.

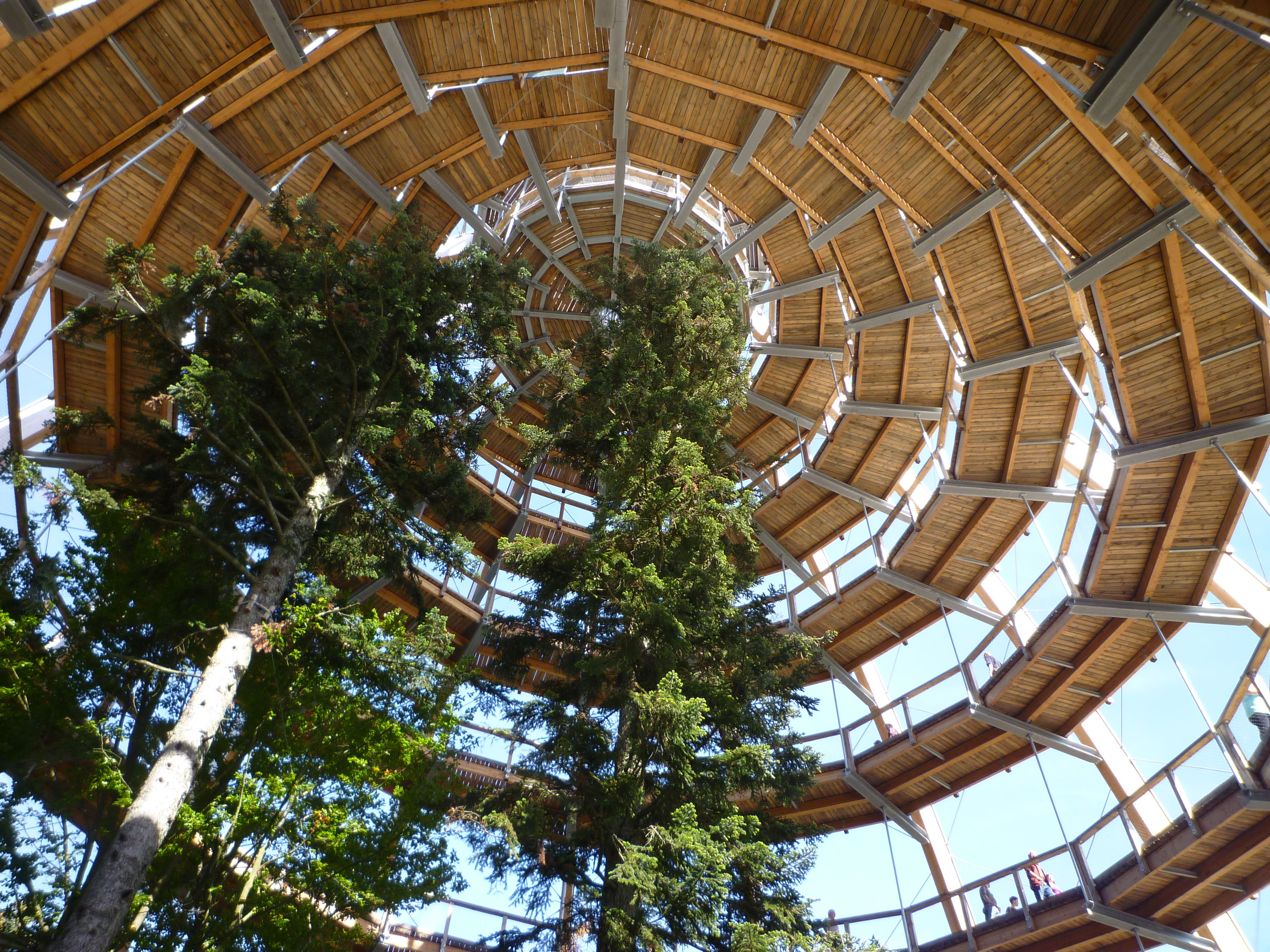
Baumwipfelpfad Neuschönau — walkway ramps into the tree tops.
