= Neureichenau =

- Municipality
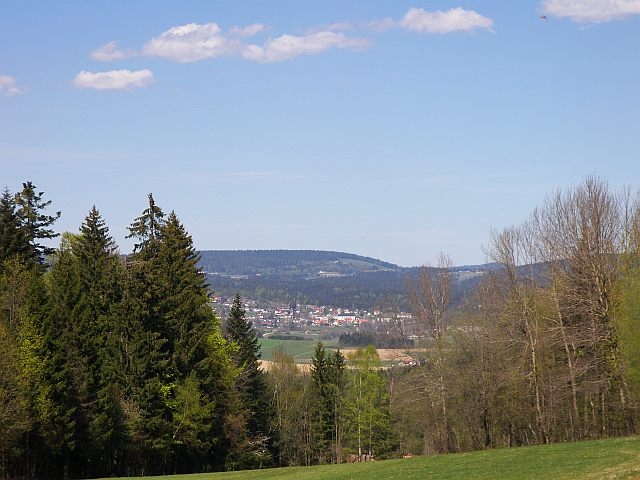
- Neureichenau

- Coat of arms

- Location of Neureichenau within Freyung-Grafenau district
- Interactive map of Neureichenau
- Location within Germany Location within Bavaria
- Coordinates: 48°45′N 13°45′E
- Country: Germany
- State: Bavaria
- Admin. region: Niederbayern
- District: Freyung-Grafenau
- Subdivisions: 25 Ortsteile

Government
  - Mayor (2020–26): Kristina Urmann (CSU)

Area
  - Total: 46.37 km^{2} (17.90 sq mi)
- Elevation: 669 m (2,195 ft)

Population (2025-12-31)
  - Total: 4,240
  - Density: 91.4/km^{2} (237/sq mi)
- Time zone: UTC+01:00 (CET)
  - Summer (DST): UTC+02:00 (CEST)
- Postal codes: 94089
- Dialling codes: 08583
- Vehicle registration: FRG
- Website: www.neureichenau.de

Neureichenau (pronounced [nɔʏˌʁaɪçəˈnaʊ], lit. 'New Reichenau', in contrast to "Old Reichenau") is a municipality in the district of Freyung-Grafenau in Bavaria in Germany.
