= Eppenschlag =

- Municipality
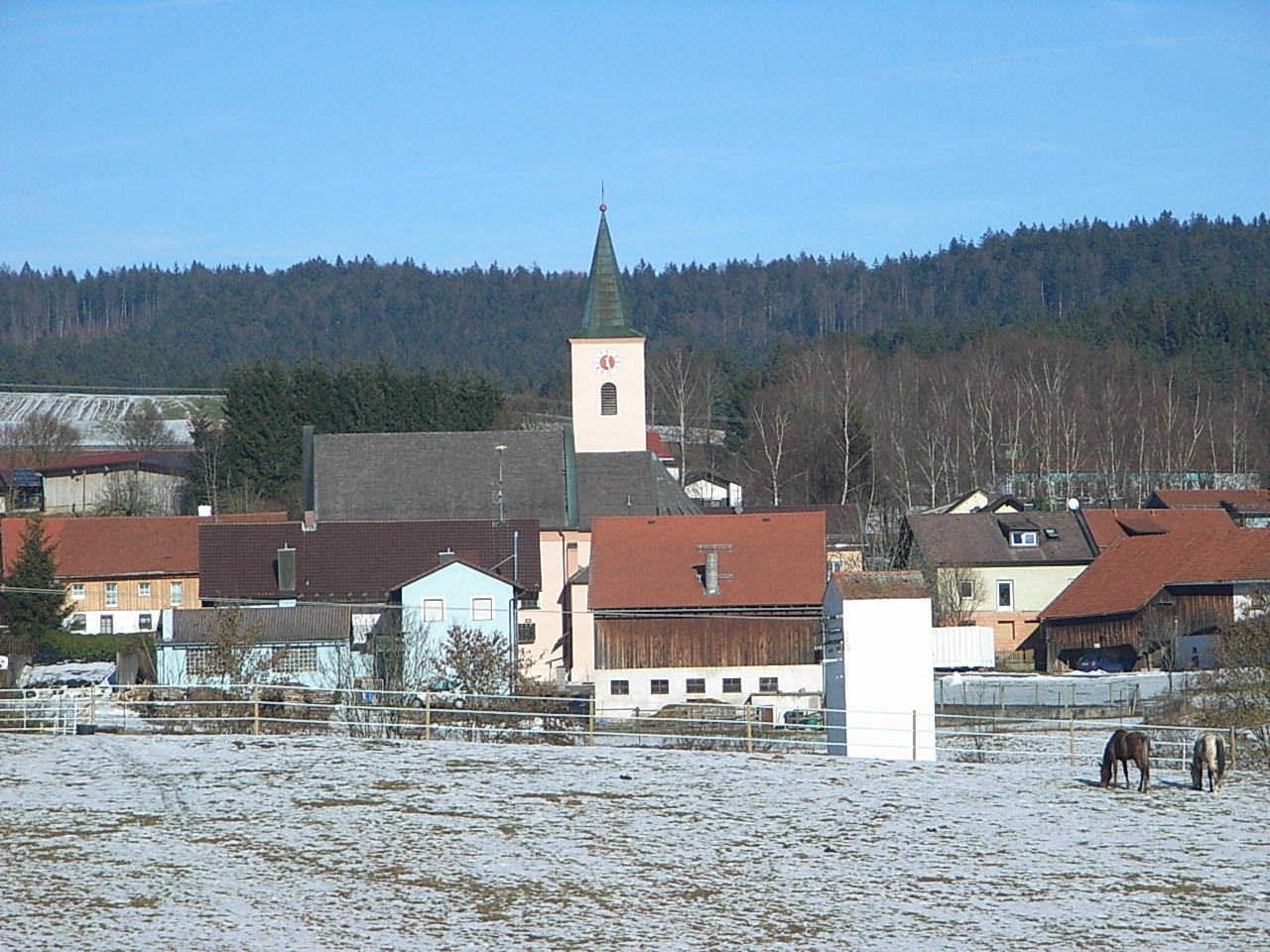
- General view of Eppenschlag

- Coat of arms

- Location of Eppenschlag within Freyung-Grafenau district
- Interactive map of Eppenschlag
- Location within Germany Location within Bavaria
- Coordinates: 48°53′N 13°18′E
- Country: Germany
- State: Bavaria
- Admin. region: Niederbayern
- District: Freyung-Grafenau
- Municipal assoc.: Schönberg

Government
  - Mayor (2020–26): Peter Schmid (CSU)

Area
  - Total: 17.01 km^{2} (6.57 sq mi)
- Elevation: 608 m (1,995 ft)

Population (2025-12-31)
  - Total: 924
  - Density: 54.3/km^{2} (141/sq mi)
- Time zone: UTC+01:00 (CET)
  - Summer (DST): UTC+02:00 (CEST)
- Postal codes: 94536
- Dialling codes: 09928
- Vehicle registration: FRG
- Website: www.eppenschlag.de

Eppenschlag is a municipality in the district of Freyung-Grafenau in Bavaria in Germany.
