= Schönberg (Verwaltungsgemeinschaft) =

- Verwaltungsgemeinschaft
- Location of Schönberg within Freyung-Grafenau district
- Interactive map of Schönberg
- Location within Germany Location within Bavaria
- Coordinates: 48°50′N 13°20′E
- Country: Germany
- State: Bavaria
- Admin. region: Lower Bavaria
- District: Freyung-Grafenau
- Seat: Schönberg
- Subdivisions: 4 municipalities

Area
  - Total: 90.92 km^{2} (35.10 sq mi)

Population (2025-12-31)
  - Total: 7,681
  - Density: 84.48/km^{2} (218.8/sq mi)
- Time zone: UTC+01:00 (CET)
  - Summer (DST): UTC+02:00 (CEST)
- Website: www.vg-schoenberg.de

Schönberg is a Verwaltungsgemeinschaft (municipal association) in the district Freyung-Grafenau in Bavaria, Germany. Its seat is in Schönberg.

It consists of the following municipalities:

1. Eppenschlag
2. Innernzell
3. Schöfweg
4. Schönberg
