= Mauth =

- Municipality
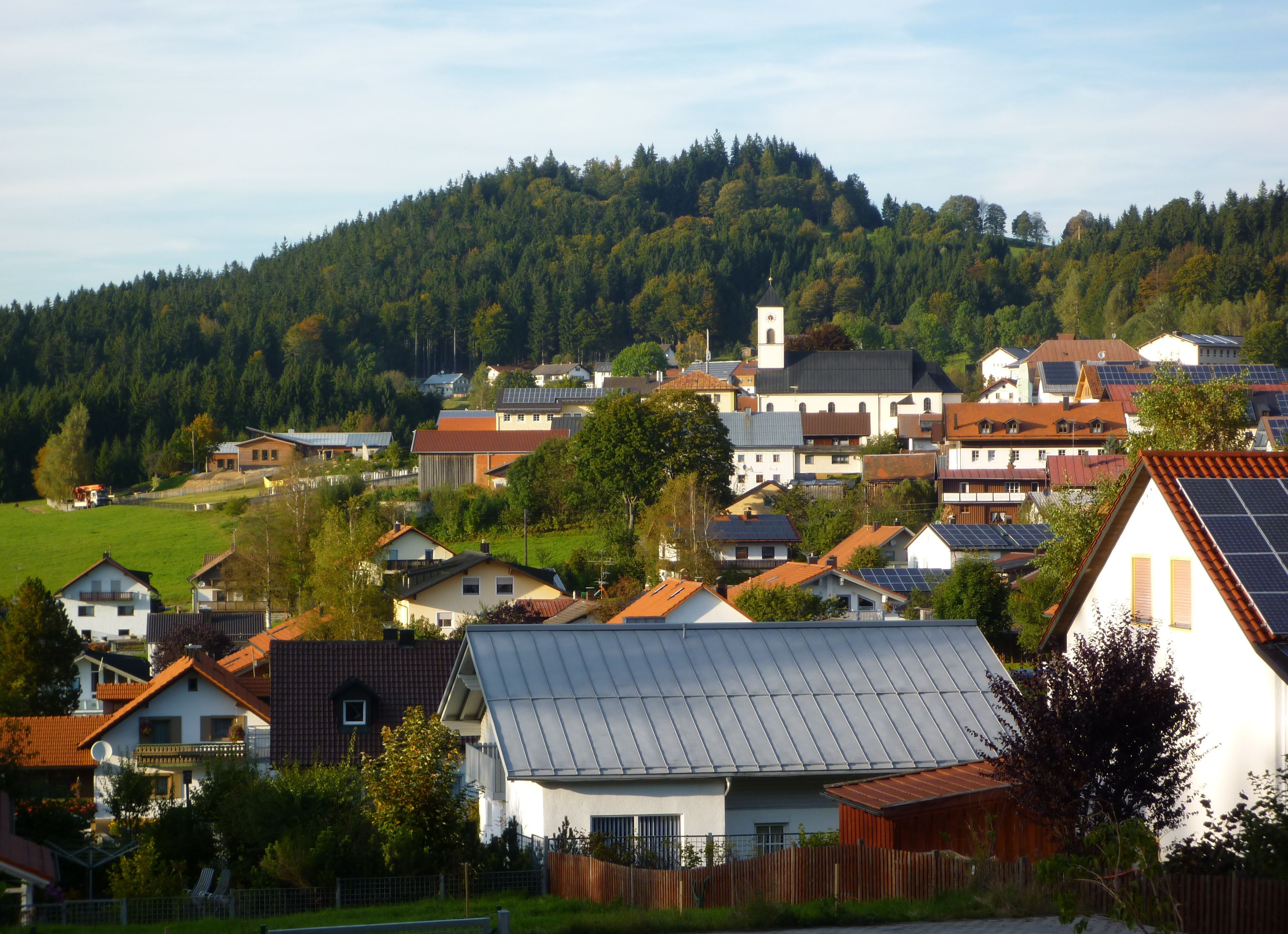
- Mauth

- Coat of arms

- Location of Mauth within Freyung-Grafenau district
- Interactive map of Mauth
- Location within Germany Location within Bavaria
- Coordinates: 48°53′N 13°35′E
- Country: Germany
- State: Bavaria
- Admin. region: Niederbayern
- District: Freyung-Grafenau

Government
  - Mayor (2024–28): Heiner Kilger (CSU)

Area
  - Total: 28.89 km^{2} (11.15 sq mi)
- Elevation: 821 m (2,694 ft)

Population (2025-12-31)
  - Total: 2,021
  - Density: 69.96/km^{2} (181.2/sq mi)
- Time zone: UTC+01:00 (CET)
  - Summer (DST): UTC+02:00 (CEST)
- Postal codes: 94151
- Dialling codes: 08557
- Vehicle registration: FRG
- Website: www.mauth.de

Mauth is a municipality in the district of Freyung-Grafenau in Bavaria in Germany.
