= Schöfweg =

- Municipality
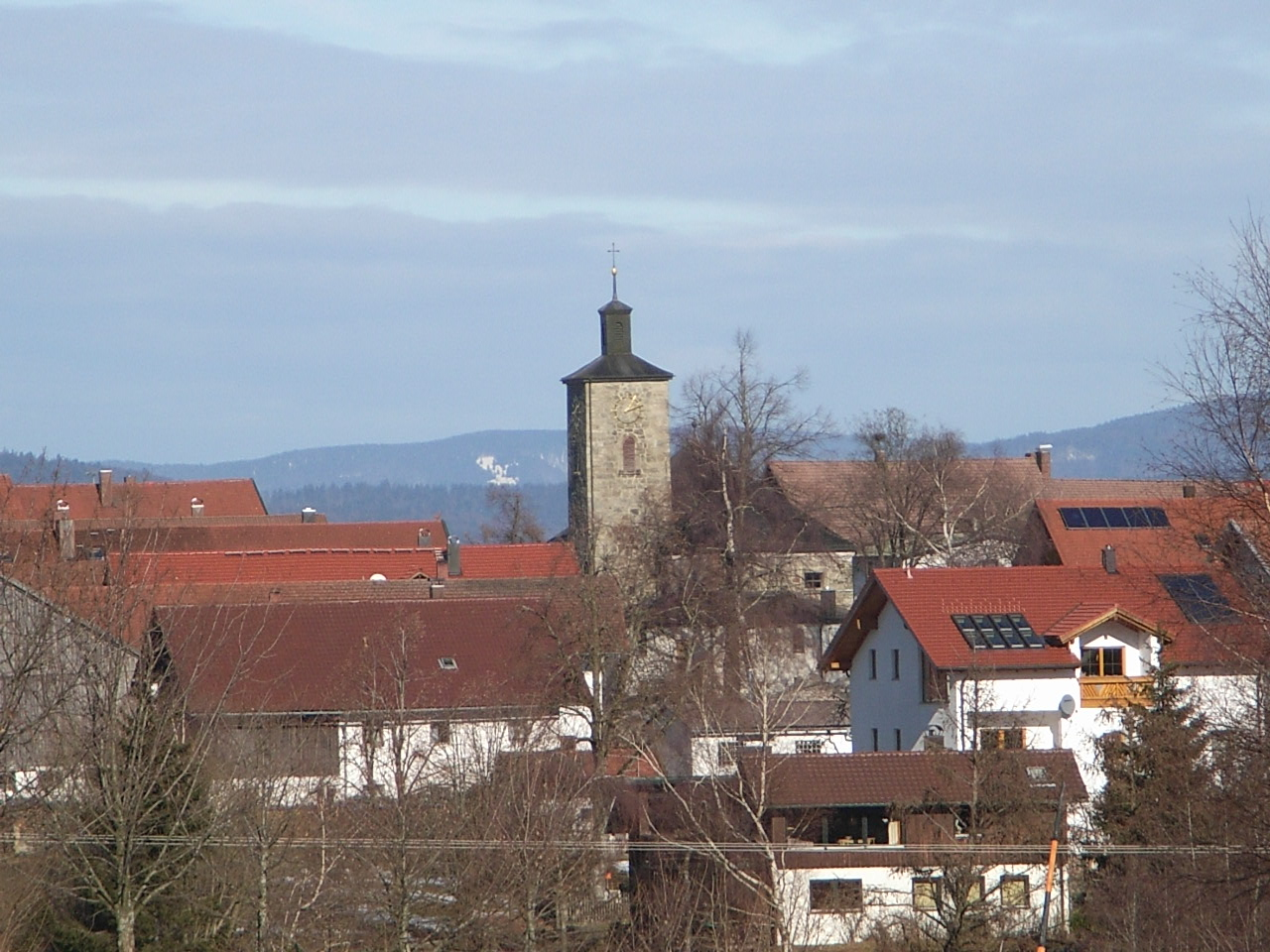
- Schöfweg

- Coat of arms

- Location of Schöfweg within Freyung-Grafenau district
- Interactive map of Schöfweg
- Location within Germany Location within Bavaria
- Coordinates: 48°50′N 13°14′E
- Country: Germany
- State: Bavaria
- Admin. region: Niederbayern
- District: Freyung-Grafenau
- Municipal assoc.: Schönberg
- Subdivisions: 3 Ortsteile

Government
  - Mayor (2020–26): Martin Geier (FW)

Area
  - Total: 15.90 km^{2} (6.14 sq mi)
- Elevation: 772 m (2,533 ft)

Population (2025-12-31)
  - Total: 1,338
  - Density: 84.15/km^{2} (217.9/sq mi)
- Time zone: UTC+01:00 (CET)
  - Summer (DST): UTC+02:00 (CEST)
- Postal codes: 94572
- Dialling codes: 09908
- Vehicle registration: FRG
- Website: www.schoefweg.de

Schöfweg is a municipality in the district of Freyung-Grafenau in Bavaria in Germany.
