= Innernzell =

- Municipality
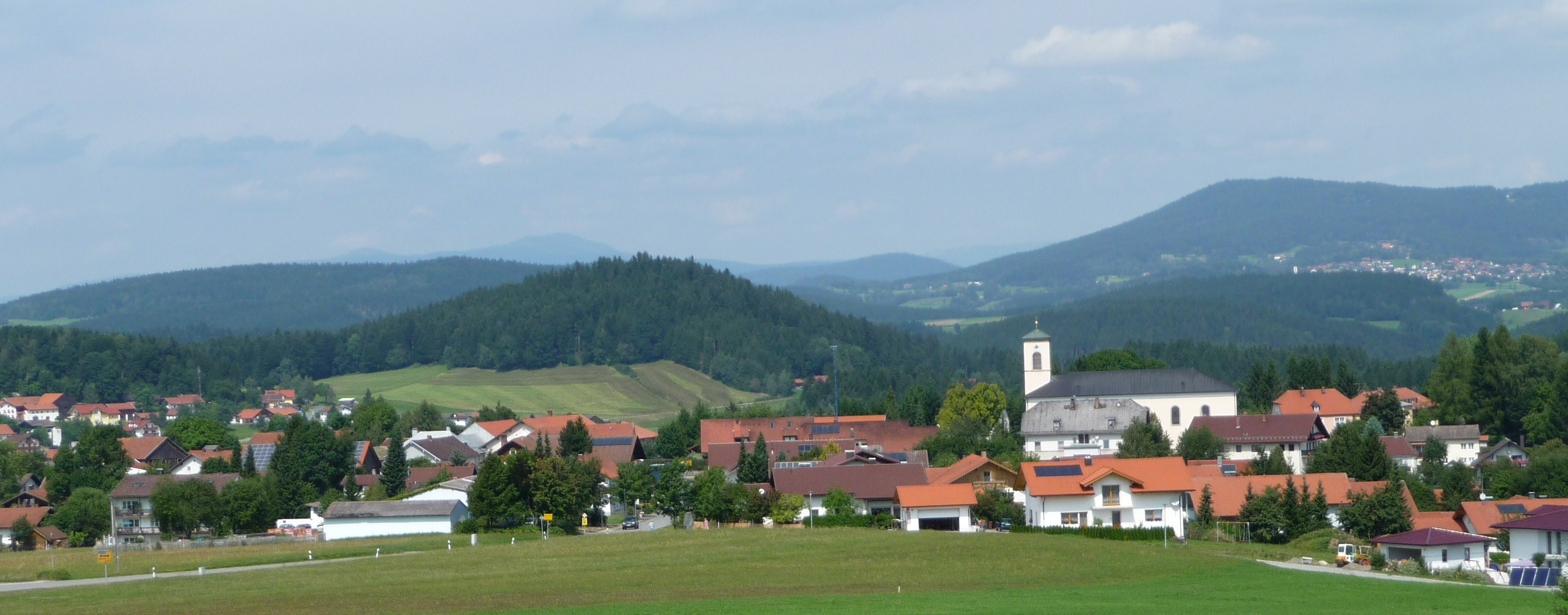
- Innernzell

- Coat of arms

- Location of Innernzell within Freyung-Grafenau district
- Interactive map of Innernzell
- Location within Germany Location within Bavaria
- Coordinates: 48°51′N 13°16′E
- Country: Germany
- State: Bavaria
- Admin. region: Niederbayern
- District: Freyung-Grafenau
- Municipal assoc.: Schönberg

Government
  - Mayor (2020–26): Josef Kern (CSU)

Area
  - Total: 22.13 km^{2} (8.54 sq mi)
- Elevation: 636 m (2,087 ft)

Population (2025-12-31)
  - Total: 1,507
  - Density: 68.10/km^{2} (176.4/sq mi)
- Time zone: UTC+01:00 (CET)
  - Summer (DST): UTC+02:00 (CEST)
- Postal codes: 94548
- Dialling codes: 08554
- Vehicle registration: FRG
- Website: www.innernzell.de

Innernzell (Central Bavarian: Innanzej) is a municipality in the district of Freyung-Grafenau in Bavaria in Germany.
