= Botanischer Garten der Nationalpark Bayerischer Wald =

Botanical garden in Bavaria, Germany

Coordinates: 48.8898°N 13.4860°E

The Botanischer Garten der Nationalpark Bayerischer Wald is a botanical garden located adjacent to the Hans-Eisenmann-Haus visitor center in the Nationalpark Bayerischer Wald at Böhmstraße 35, Neuschönau, Bavaria, Germany. The garden contains over 700 plant species found in the Bavarian Forest, in habitats ranging from meadows, slopes, and rock fields, to springs, ponds, and bogs. It also includes geological displays.

== See also ==
- List of botanical gardens in Germany
