= Jandelsbrunn =

- Municipality
- Coat of arms

- Location of Jandelsbrunn within Freyung-Grafenau district
- Interactive map of Jandelsbrunn
- Location within Germany Location within Bavaria
- Coordinates: 48°44′N 13°42′E
- Country: Germany
- State: Bavaria
- Admin. region: Niederbayern
- District: Freyung-Grafenau
- Subdivisions: 3 Ortsteile

Government
  - Mayor (2020–26): Roland Freund

Area
  - Total: 42.40 km^{2} (16.37 sq mi)
- Elevation: 657 m (2,156 ft)

Population (2025-12-31)
  - Total: 3,361
  - Density: 79.27/km^{2} (205.3/sq mi)
- Time zone: UTC+01:00 (CET)
  - Summer (DST): UTC+02:00 (CEST)
- Postal codes: 94117–94118
- Dialling codes: 08583 08581 (Wollaberg)
- Vehicle registration: FRG
- Website: www.jandelsbrunn.de

Jandelsbrunn is a municipality in the district of Freyung-Grafenau in Bavaria in Germany.
