= Hohenau =

- Municipality
- Coat of arms

- Location of Hohenau within Freyung-Grafenau district
- Interactive map of Hohenau
- Location within Germany Location within Bavaria
- Coordinates: 48°51′N 13°29′E
- Country: Germany
- State: Bavaria
- Admin. region: Niederbayern
- District: Freyung-Grafenau
- Subdivisions: 20 Ortsteile

Government
  - Mayor (2020–26): Josef Gais (CSU)

Area
  - Total: 43.12 km^{2} (16.65 sq mi)
- Elevation: 804 m (2,638 ft)

Population (2025-12-31)
  - Total: 3,280
  - Density: 76.1/km^{2} (197/sq mi)
- Time zone: UTC+01:00 (CET)
  - Summer (DST): UTC+02:00 (CEST)
- Postal codes: 94545
- Dialling codes: 08558
- Vehicle registration: FRG
- Website: www.hohenau.de

Hohenau is a municipality in the district of Freyung-Grafenau in Bavaria in Germany.
