= Saldenburg =

- Municipality
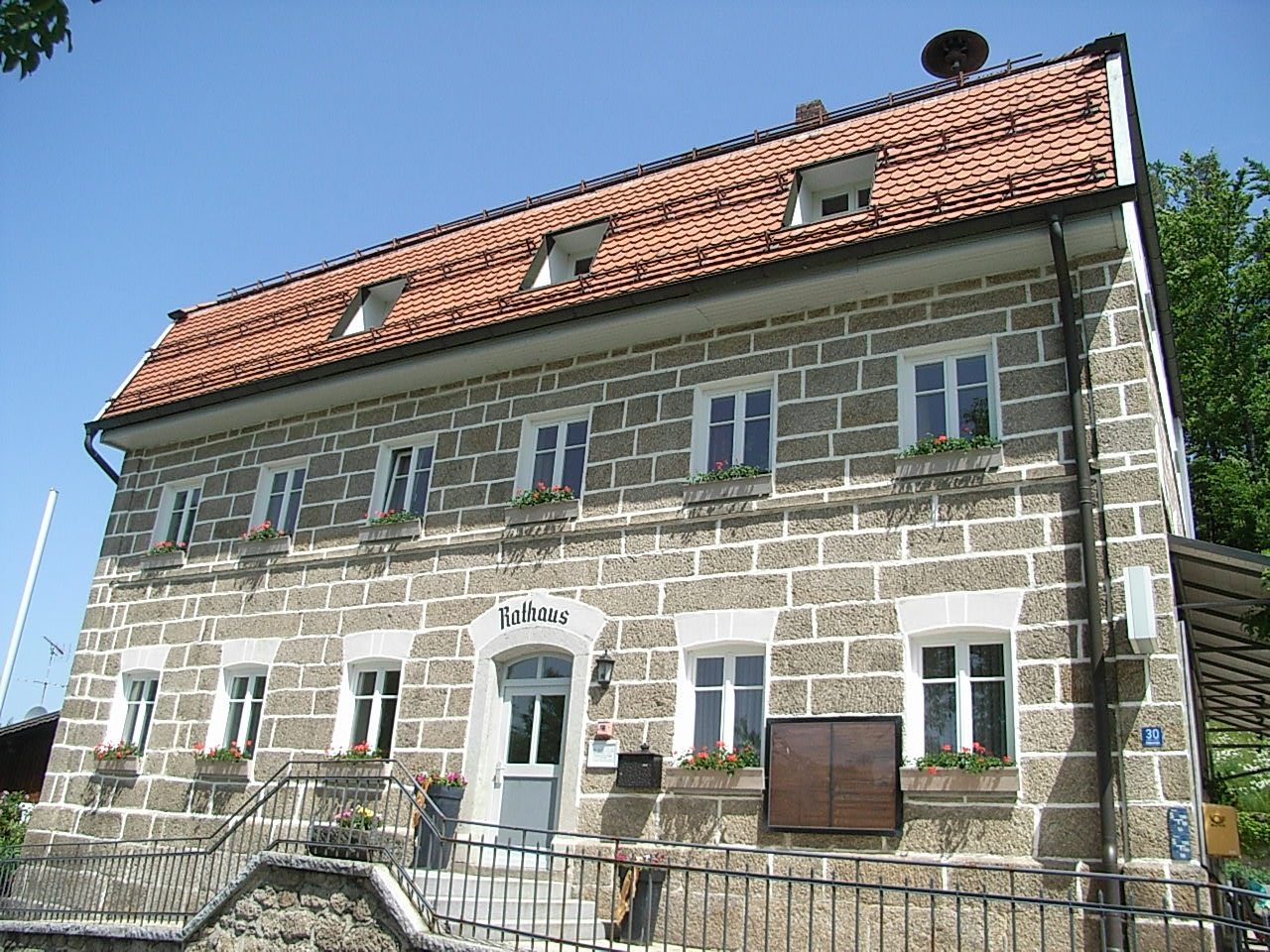
- Town hall

- Coat of arms

- Location of Saldenburg within Freyung-Grafenau district
- Interactive map of Saldenburg
- Location within Germany Location within Bavaria
- Coordinates: 48°47′N 13°21′E
- Country: Germany
- State: Bavaria
- Admin. region: Niederbayern
- District: Freyung-Grafenau

Government
  - Mayor (2020–26): Max König (SPD)

Area
  - Total: 28.04 km^{2} (10.83 sq mi)
- Elevation: 450–570 m (1,480–1,870 ft)

Population (2025-12-31)
  - Total: 2,002
  - Density: 71.40/km^{2} (184.9/sq mi)
- Time zone: UTC+01:00 (CET)
  - Summer (DST): UTC+02:00 (CEST)
- Postal codes: 94163
- Dialling codes: 08504
- Vehicle registration: FRG
- Website: www.saldenburg.de

Saldenburg is a municipality in the district of Freyung-Grafenau in Bavaria in Germany.

The municipality comprises the following 30 villages and locations:

- Altreuth
- Auggenthal
- Bruckwiesreuth
- Dießenstein
- Ebersdorf
- Entschenreuth
- Furthsäge
- Goben
- Haberlmühle
- Hals
- Haufang
- Haunleiten
- Hirschreuth
- Hundsruck
- Lanzenreuth
- Lembach
- Matzersdorf
- Oberöd
- Ohmühle
- Platten
- Preying
- Rettenbach
- Saldenburg
- Senging
- Söldenreuth
- Spitzingerreuth
- Stadl
- Sumpering
- Trautmannsdorf
- Unteröd
