= Freyung-Grafenau =

Coordinates: 48°50′N 13°30′E

Freyung-Grafenau Freing-Grofanau (Bavarian)
- District
- Flag Coat of arms
- Country: Germany
- State: Bavaria
- Adm. region: Lower Bavaria
- Capital: Freyung

Government
  - District admin.: Sebastian Gruber (CSU)

Area
  - Total: 984 km^{2} (380 sq mi)

Population (31 December 2025)
  - Total: 78,441
  - Density: 79.7/km^{2} (206/sq mi)
- Time zone: UTC+01:00 (CET)
  - Summer (DST): UTC+02:00 (CEST)
- Vehicle registration: FRG, WOS, GRA
- Website: freyung-grafenau.de

Freyung-Grafenau (Bavarian: Freing-Grofanau) is a Landkreis (district) in Bavaria, Germany. It is bounded by (from the south and clockwise) the districts of Passau, Deggendorf and Regen, the Czech Republic and by Austria.

== History ==
The district was established in 1972, by merging the former districts of Grafenau and Wolfstein. In medieval times Wolfstein (east of the Ilz River) was the property of the bishop of Passau and the site of Wolfstein Castle, now a schloss. Grafenau (west of the Ilz River) successively belonged to different countries, before it was annexed by Bavaria in 1438. Wolfstein became a part of Bavaria two years after the dissolution of the clerical states in Germany (1803).

== Geography ==
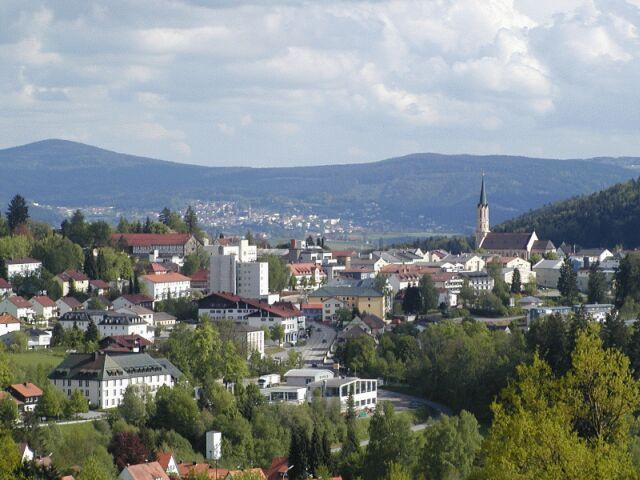
Freyung

Freyung-Grafenau is the easternmost district of Bavaria. It is located in the southern part of the Bavarian Forest and is partially occupied by the Bavarian Forest National Park. The source of the Ilz River is situated in the district.

== Coat of arms ==
The wolf represents the area of Wolfstein, while the bear stands for Grafenau (as it was ruled from the castle of Bärnstein, and Bär means "bear"). At the bottom sits the blue and white lozengy pattern of Bavaria.

== Towns and municipalities ==
Clickable map of towns and municipalities in the district

Towns
1. Freyung
2. Grafenau
3. Waldkirchen

Markt

1. Röhrnbach
Municipalities
1. Grainet
2. Haidmühle
3. Hohenau
4. Jandelsbrunn
5. Mauth
6. Neureichenau

7. Neuschönau
8. Ringelai
9. Saldenburg
10. Sankt Oswald-Riedlhütte
11. Spiegelau

Verwaltungsgemeinschaften
1. Hinterschmiding; 1. Hinterschmiding^{1}; 2. Philippsreut	2. Perlesreut; 1. Fürsteneck; 2. Perlesreut^{1,2}	3. Schönberg; 1. Eppenschlag; 2. Innernzell; 3. Schöfweg; 4. Schönberg^{1,2}	4. Thurmansbang; 1. Thurmansbang^{1}; 2. Zenting
^{1}seat of the Verwaltungsgemeinschaft; ^{2}Markt

== See also ==
Schneekirche
