= NATO Enhanced Forward Presence =

Forward-deployed defense and deterrence posture in Eastern Europe

Enhanced Forward Presence (EFP) is a NATO-allied forward-deployed defense and deterrence military force in Northern, Central and Eastern Europe. This posture in Northern Europe through Finland, Estonia, Latvia, and Lithuania and in Central Europe through Poland, Slovakia and Hungary and in Eastern Europe through Romania and Bulgaria, is in place to protect and reassure the security of NATO's Northern, Central and Eastern European member states on NATO's eastern flank.

Insignia of the Enhanced Forward Presence

Following Russia's invasion of Crimea, NATO's member states agreed at the 2016 Warsaw summit to forward deploy four multinational battalion battle groups to areas most likely to be attacked.

The numbers involved, although a notable supplement to the armed forces of the country being defended, are limited so that they avoid seeming to threaten Russia. The chief value of the force is that it is impossible to invade Poland or the Baltic states without battling the soldiers and firing on the flags of the involved NATO states, giving cause for war. It is believed that the prospect of war with all those countries will deter aggression.

The original four multinational battalion battle groups are based in Estonia, Latvia, Lithuania, and Poland, and led by the United Kingdom, Canada, Germany, and the United States respectively.

Following the 2022 Russian invasion of Ukraine, NATO members agreed to establish four more multinational battalion battle groups in Bulgaria, Hungary, Romania, and Slovakia led by Italy, Hungary, France, Czech Republic respectively at 2022 Madrid Summit. Starting in 2026, a battle group led by Sweden will also be deployed to Rovaniemi, Finland.

Location of NATO Enhanced Forward Presence battalion battle groups within Europe

| Country | Location | Leading state | Participants as of June 2026 | Troops (approx.) (Note: The data is from November 2022. The numbers in Bulgaria, Hungary and Slovakia include participating troops from their own national Armed Forces.) |
|---|---|---|---|---|
| Bulgaria | Kabile | Italy | Albania, Greece, Montenegro, North Macedonia, Turkey, United States | 1,650 |
| Estonia | Tapa | United Kingdom | France | 2,200 |
| Hungary | Tata | Hungary | Croatia, Italy, Turkey, United States | 1,054 |
| Latvia | Ādaži | Canada | Albania, Czech Republic, Denmark, Iceland, Italy, Montenegro, North Macedonia, Poland, Slovakia, Slovenia, Spain, Sweden | 4,000 |
| Lithuania | Rukla | Germany | Belgium, Croatia, Czech Republic, Luxembourg, Netherlands, Norway | 3,700 |
| Poland | Orzysz | United States | Croatia, Romania, United Kingdom | 11,600 |
| Romania | Cincu | France | Belgium, Luxembourg, Spain | 4,700 |
| Slovakia | Lešť | Spain | Czech Republic, Portugal, Romania, Slovenia | 1,100 |
| Finland | Rovaniemi | Sweden | Denmark, France, Iceland, Italy, Norway, United Kingdom | |

The troops serving in the multinational battalion battle groups rotate every six months and train and operate with their host nations' militaries.

== Multinational Battalion Battle Group Estonia ==
=== Belgium ===
The Belgian Army contributes a 269-soldier strong Belgian Land Component armoured infantry company from the Chasseurs Ardennais with support elements and HQ staff officers.

=== Denmark and Iceland ===
The Danish Army will deploy a mechanized force by 2018 at the latest. Three brigade HQ support personnel from the Royal Danish Army and 1 strategic communications civilian from the Icelandic defence forces have also been stationed in Estonia.

=== France ===
The British unit will be supported by a mixed battle group from the French Army's 9th Light Armoured Marine Brigade consisting of a mechanized infantry company from the 2nd Marine Infantry Regiment equipped with VBCI infantry fighting vehicles, artillery from the 11th Marine Artillery Regiment equipped with CAESAR self-propelled howitzers, and combat engineers from the 6th Engineer Regiment, with a company of Leclerc main battle tanks from the 7th Armoured Brigade's 1st Chasseurs Regiment attached for the deployment.

=== United Kingdom ===
The United Kingdom under Operation Cabrit deployed 800 personnel from the British Army's 20th Armoured Brigade Combat Team:

- 5th Battalion of The Rifles with Warrior infantry fighting vehicles
- and the Queen's Royal Hussars with Challenger 2 main battle tanks.
- Artillery, an armoured engineer squadron, logistics specialists and reconnaissance assets will be attached to the British contingent.

The British Army's 5th Battalion, The Rifles battlegroup, rotated back to the United Kingdom in November 2017 and was replaced by a battlegroup formed around the 1st Battalion, Royal Welsh.

During 2022 between March and June Exercise Spring Storm took place which brought AgustaWestland Apache AH.1's and AgustaWestland Wildcat AH.1's to Estonia and other Eastern European countries.

As part of Aviation Task Force 3 under Operation Peleda, Chinook HC.5/6s from No. 27 Squadron RAF were deployed to Amari Air Base between 8 July and September 2022. They were supported by the Joint Helicopter Support Squadron, Tactical Supply Wing RAF and 244 Signal Squadron (Air Support) (of 30 Signal Regiment). Chinook HC.5/6s from No. 18 Squadron RAF deployed to Amari from January to February 2023.

== Multinational Brigade Latvia ==
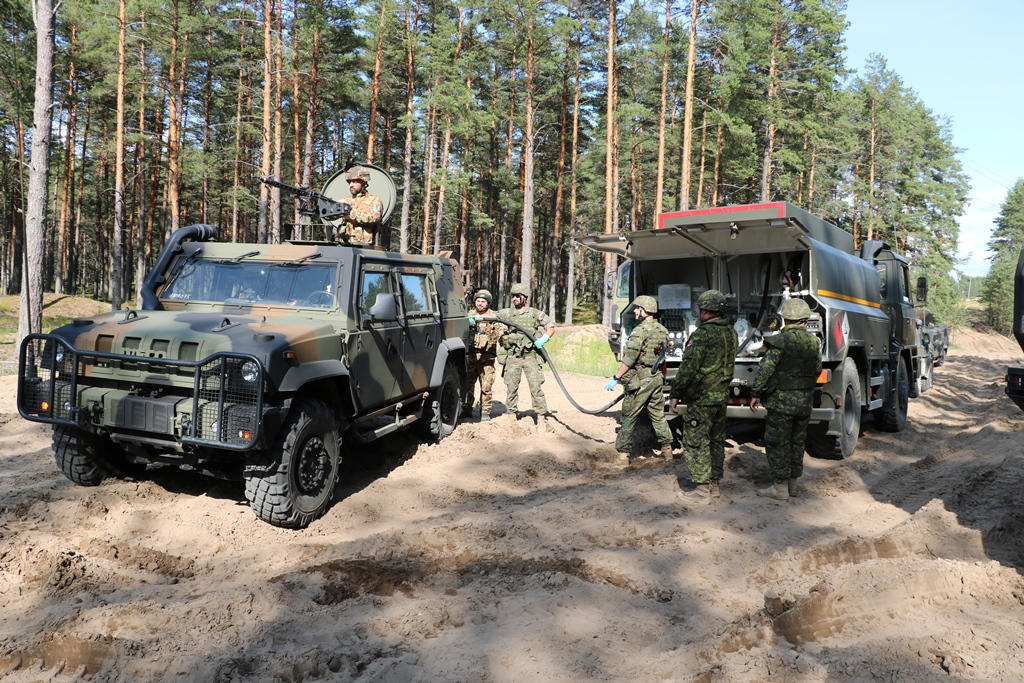
Italian Army 1st Bersaglieri Regiment VTLM Lince being refueled by Canadian Army and Slovenian Army troops

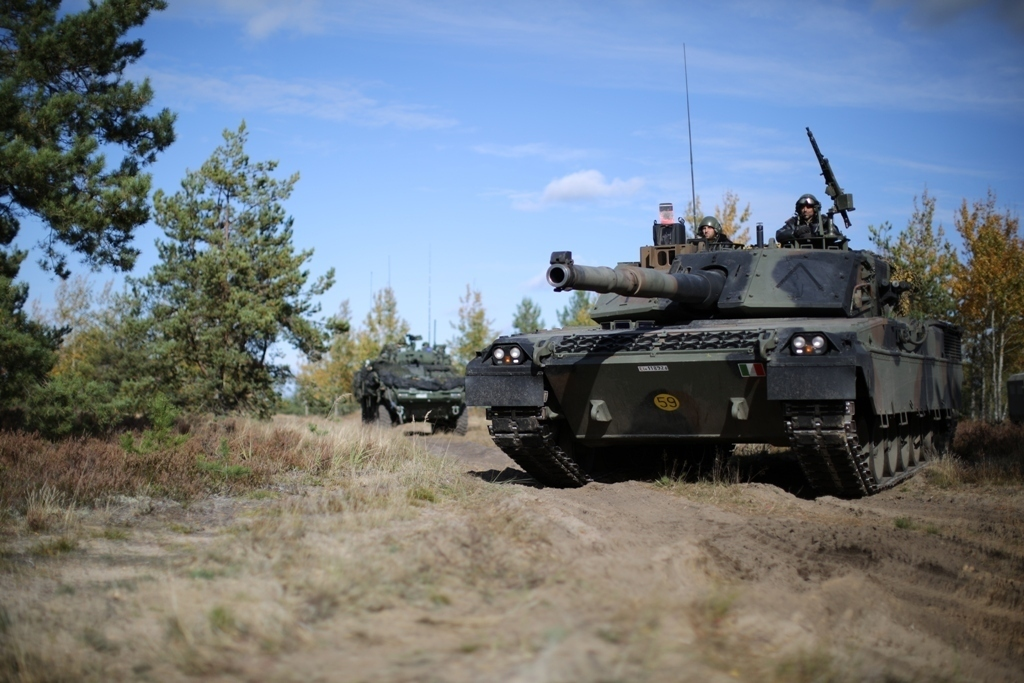
Italian Army 4th Tank Regiment Ariete main battle tank and a Canadian Army LAV VI during a training exercise

Structure of Latvian eFP Battle Group

The Latvian multinational battalion battle group is based at Camp Ādaži, near the Latvian capital of Riga, and contains approximately 1,500 personnel.

=== Albania ===
Albania will send a small detachment of 21 EOD engineers from the Albanian Land Force.

=== Canada ===
Canada is the lead framework nation and initially had 540 soldiers station in Latvia. As of 2025 that number has grown to 2,200 soldiers which will be further increasing to 2,600. The initial 540 soldiers were mechanized infantry and supporting troops. Operation Reassurance, is provided by Canada's high-readiness brigade, a task which rotates annually amongst the three Regular Force brigades of the country. Reservists from more than 100 units across Canada have provided several augmentees to each rotation.

==== 2017 ====
In 2017, the contingent was provided by 1 Canadian Mechanized Brigade Group in Western Canada, which handed over to 2 Canadian Mechanized Brigade Group in Eastern Canada in 2018. The 2nd Battalion, Royal Canadian Regiment (RCR), based in CFB Gagetown, rotated in to relieve the 1st Battalion, Princess Patricia's Canadian Light Infantry (PPCLI).

==== 2018 ====
In June 2018, the 2nd Battalion RCR was replaced by the 1st Battalion RCR, based out of Petawawa, Ontario.

==== 2019 ====
In January 2019, Canada's French-speaking mechanized brigade from Quebec, (5 Canadian Mechanized Brigade Group), took on the task. The commanding officer, Lieutenant-Colonel Sauvé, and most of the soldiers were from the 2nd Battalion of the Royal 22^{e} Régiment (2R22^{e}R) or the armoured 12^{e} Régiment blindé du Canada (12^{e} RBC). In accordance with this rotation cycle, they were replaced in July 2019 by the 2nd Battalion PPCLI from the 1st Canadian Mechanized Brigade Group.

==== 2020 ====
In January 2020, a battle group led by Lord Strathcona's Horse (Royal Canadians), of the 1st Canadian Mechanized Brigade Group, rotated in to Latvia, and was replaced by a battle group led by the 2nd Battalion RCR.

==== 2021 ====
In January 2021, a battle group led by the Royal Canadian Dragoons, of 2 Canadian Mechanized Brigade Group, relieved the 2nd Battalion RCR.

==== 2023 ====
On 15 December 2023 the Canadian Defence Minister announced several measures to strengthen Canada’s military presence in Latvia as part of the planned increase from about 1,000 Canadian personnel to 2,200 by 2026. These include:

- The deployment of four Griffon helicopters to the battle group starting in summer 2024. These will be periodically joined by Chinook helicopters, starting in autumn 2025.
- The procurement of portable LR Spike anti-armour missile systems for the Canadian Forces in Latvia. These will be arriving from Rafael Advanced Defense Systems starting in mid-2024.
- The deployment of medium-range radar capabilities, which will support the battle group's air defence. They will be joined in due course by a to-be-procured Canadian air defence system.
- The full complement of about 130 personnel for Canada's tank squadron of 15 Leopard 2A4M tanks should be in place by spring 2024.
- A total investment of more than CA$15 million in infrastructure needed to scale up the battle group to a brigade group.

==== 2024 ====
On 15 February 2024, the Canadian Defence Minister announced that the Canadian Armed Forces members in Latvia will receive air defence capabilities consisting of:

- The RBS 70 NG short-range air defence system to defend themselves against fixed-wing aircraft and helicopters within its range, close air support aircraft, small uncrewed aerial systems, and larger uncrewed aerial systems.
- A counter-drone capability against small drones using the TRD Systems of Singapore ORION-H9 dismounted directional systems; the CACI Inc. of the United States CACI BEAM 3.0 omni-directional systems; and the Leonardo UK Ltd. Falcon Shield fixed-site systems.

==== 2025 ====
On August 26, 2025, it was announced that Canada would be extending the mission into 2029. The extension will see the number of Canadian soldiers increase to 2,600.

In December 2025, reports emerged that the Canadian Armed Forces started a study regarding the establishment of a permanent base in Latvia.

A senior CAF general, during a 2025 parliamentary defense‑committee hearing, said that “more than 30 per cent” of Canada’s contingent in Latvia was “incapable of combat”.

=== Czech Republic ===
The Czech Armed Forces provide a mortar platoon of 55 soldiers.

=== Denmark ===
In April 2022, the first part of a force consisting of about 750 Danish soldiers, along with armoured vehicles, arrived in Latvia.

=== Italy ===
Italy will provide an Italian Army mechanized Infantry company with Freccia and Dardo infantry fighting vehicles. Recently the Italian Army has reinforced its presence with 8 Ariete main battle tanks.

=== Montenegro ===
Montenegro provides a reconnaissance squad.

=== Poland ===
Poland provides an armored company with Leopard 2PL main battle tanks.

=== Slovenia ===
Slovenia will deploy an Infantry reconnaissance platoon, Tactical Air Control Party (TACP) team, Contribution to battlegroup headquarters, Support elements of the Slovenian Armed Forces.

=== Slovakia ===
Slovakia deployed an armored infantry company consisting of 150 troops from 11th Mechanized Battalion starting in second half of 2018. The Slovak force contribution consisted of:

- A mechanized company on 10 BMP-2 and two BVP-M.
- Command and Control Element
- Military Police team
- Repairs and Operation Platoon as a support element
- A team of medics

In December 2020, Slovakia changed its capabilities from mechanized to artillery. The Slovak contingent (SLOVCON) currently consists of:

- Artillery Battery on Zuzana 2
- Support Platoon (Repairs and Maintenance)
- NSE (National Support Element)
- Military Police Team
- Priest
- Medic Team

=== Spain ===
Spain will dispatch a reinforced armored infantry company consisting of around 350 troops from the 11th Mechanized Infantry Brigade "Extremadura". The Spanish contingent will include 6 Leopard 2E main battle tanks from the I/16th Tank Battalion "Mérida" of the 16th Armored Regiment "Castilla" and 15 Pizarro infantry fighting vehicles from the I/6th Mechanized Infantry Battalion "Cantabria" of the 6th Infantry Regiment "Saboya".

=== Sweden ===
In January 2025, Sweden deployed its first ever NATO force to Latvia on a rotation for approximately six months. This force was a reduced force of the 71st Mechanized Battalion from the South Scanian Regiment of the Swedish Army. The force comprised around 600 soldiers and was equipped with standard Swedish armoured vehicles such as the CV 90 IFV and "Pansarterrängbil 360" APC.

== Multinational battalion Battle Group Lithuania ==
Units from the 414 Tank Battalion, 3-66 Armor, Iron Wolf Brigade, Brigada «Guadarrama» XII at the Iron Wolf exercises in the Pabradė Training Area, Lithuania. Infantry brigades supported by armour, the exercise simulated a variety of outdoor combat operations and ran from 11 to 22 October 2021.

The Lithuania multinational battalion battle group is under the command of the Mechanised Infantry Brigade Iron Wolf of the Lithuanian Land Forces and based in Rukla. The battalion has a headquarters company, three to four combat companies and various support units. The battle group is led by Germany. Each rotation lasts six months. Additionally, since the Russian invasion of Ukraine, the German Armed Forces have expanded their presence in Lithuania. In December 2023 German Minister of Defence Boris Pistorius and Lithuanian Minister of Defence Arvydas Anušauskas agreed to form a new German brigade and permanently station it in Lithuania beginning in 2025.

In May 2025, the German Ministry of Defence confirmed that its contribution to the eFP battlegroup in Lithuania—approximately 1,000 troops—would be permanently subordinated to the newly established 45th Panzer Brigade “Litauen” by February 2026. This shift marks the transition from a rotational deterrence model to an embedded, nationally commanded structure within NATO’s eastern flank posture. The German brigade, based in Lithuania, is expected to grow to around 2,000 personnel by mid-2026, integrating both the eFP force and combat units redeployed from Germany.

In December 2024 details the organization of the new 45th Panzer Brigade were made public.

| Date | November 2017 | | Parent unit(s) | March 2019 | | Parent unit(s) | October 2020 | | Parent unit(s) |
| Country/number of troops | November 2017 | | Parent unit(s) | March 2019 | | Parent unit(s) | October 2020 | | Parent unit(s) |
|---|---|---|---|---|---|---|---|---|---|
| Belgium | 60 | Support elements | | 1 | Staff officer for battlegroup headquarters | | 1 | Public affairs officer | |
| Czech Republic | n/a | - | | 230 | Mechanized infantry company Support elements | | 35 | Electronic warfare element Support elements | |
| Croatia | 178 | Mechanized infantry company (15x Patria MV armoured vehicles, 4x multiple-launch rocket system 3x M-ATV mine-resistant vehicles) | 1st Mechanized Battalion "Tigers" of Mechanized Guard Brigade | 208 | Mechanized infantry company | | 208 | Mechanized infantry company | |
| France | n/a | - | | n/a | - | | 275 | Mechanised infantry company Armoured platoon with MBT | |
| Germany | 450 | Armoured infantry battalion with AFVs complemented with MBTs and self-propelled artillery Mobility engineers, Intelligence, surveillance and reconnaissance (incl. tactical UAVs) and support elements | | 540 | Armoured infantry company Combat service Combat service support | | 527 | Armoured company Mechanised infantry platoon Combat service Combat service support | |
| Iceland | 1 | 1 Coast guard officer for explosive ordnance disposal | | 1 | Public affairs civilian | | 1 | Public affairs civilian | |
| Luxembourg | 22 | Integrated into Belgian Support elements | | n/a | - | | 4 | Transportation team | |
| Netherlands | 250-270 | Armoured infantry company with AFV | | 250-270 | Mechanised infantry company with AFV | | 270 | Mechanised infantry company Logistics support element | |
| Norway | 200 | Combined arms company - armoured | Drawn from Telemark Battalion and other Brigade Nord units [equipped with CV9030 IFVs and Leopard 2A4NO MBTs] | 13 | Joint fires section | Artillery Battalion | 120 | Armoured infantry company with AFV | |
| Total | 1181 | | | 1055 | | | 1233 | | |

=== Belgium and Luxembourg ===
==== 2017 ====
The Belgian Army sent a logistic support company, which arrived in Lithuania on 24 January 2017. The 100 men from the 18th Logistics Battalion and 29th Logistics Battalion of the Belgian Land Component with medical and military police units attached arrived by ferry in Klaipėda and contain a small detachment of troops from the Luxembourg Army, which brought with them around ten transport trucks.

=== Czech Republic ===
In July 2018, Czechia provided EFP Lithuania the 1st Company Task Force consisting of a mechanized company with Pandur armored vehicles reinforced by an engineer platoon, a logistics unit and a medical element reaching a total of 230 people. After six months, they were replaced by the 2nd Task Force for the next half-year. Both task forces consisted of the 41st Mechanized Battalion's soldiers. After deployment, the company task force returned to the Czech Republic in July 2019. From then on until 2021, Czech Army sent four electronic warfare task forces. Since July 2021, an anti-aircraft missile battery from the 252nd Anti-Aircraft Missile Section (sub-unit of the 25th Anti-Aircraft Missile Regiment) armed with RBS 70 has been operating in Lithuania.

=== France ===
Some 200 soldiers from 5th Dragoon Regiment of the French Army have arrived to Rukla on 3 July 2020, staying there for 6 months until the end of December, with a hundred more administration and logistics personnel. The troops form a mechanised infantry company and are reinforced with 5 Leclerc tanks and 14 VBCI IFVs.

=== Germany ===
The first German Army unit to deploy to Lithuania is the 122nd Mechanized Battalion of the 12th Armoured Brigade of the 10th Panzer Division. Equipped with Marder infantry fighting vehicles the battalion will be augmented with Leopard 2A6 main battle tanks from the 104th Tank Battalion, PzH 2000 self-propelled artillery from the 131st Artillery Battalion engineers from the 4th Armored Engineer Battalion and troops from the 4th Supply Battalion. In June 2021, around 30 German soldiers were recalled from service in Lithuania after they were accused of making racist and anti-Semitic remarks and of sexual violence.

=== Norway ===
==== 2018-2019 ====
From January to June 2018 about 30 soldiers deployed from the Intelligence Battalion's long-range reconnaissance patrol squadron.

==== 2019-2021 ====
From July 2019 troops from the Telemark Battalion and the Armoured Battalion are alternating on deploying an armoured infantry company with IFVs and MBTs consisting of 120-140 soldiers.

==== 2022 ====
From January 2022 2nd Battalion contributes a mechanized company with a tank capacity of about 140 personnel

The Norwegian Government said in February 2022 that it will increase its contribution with up to 60 soldiers due to the 2021–2022 Russo-Ukrainian crisis. In June 2022 the Government extended Norway's contribution in Lithuania until 2023 due to the war in Ukraine.

In August 2022 the taskforce was increased by a platoon from Telemark Battalion, bringing the total number of troops up to ca. 200.

== Multinational Battalion Battle Group Poland ==
The Poland-based multinational battalion Battle Group, known as Battle Group Poland (BGPOL), is currently led by the United States Army's 2nd ("Cougars") Squadron, 2nd Cavalry Regiment (United States) headquartered in Rose Barracks, Germany. The Battle Group consists of a US combined-arms battalion, a Sabre Squadron from the Royal Scots Dragoon Guards, a Croatian rocket artillery battery, and an ADA company from the Romanian Army.

The Battle Group is attached to the Polish Army's 16th Mechanized Brigade and based in Orzysz located south of Kaliningrad Oblast and 120 kilometers away from the Suwałki Gap.
