= Training and Doctrine Command (Lithuania) =

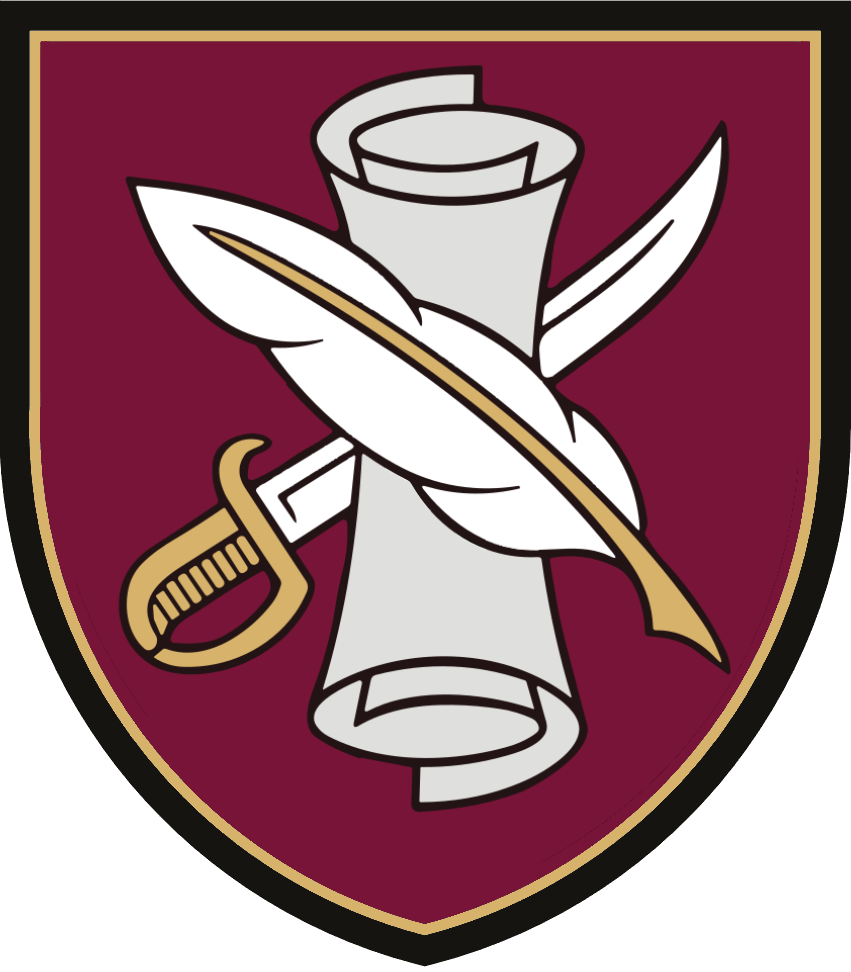
- Insignia of the TRADOC
- Active: 1998 – present
- Country: Lithuania
- Branch: Joint (Lithuanian Armed Forces)
- Type: Training Command
- Role: military recruitment basic military training and education
- Garrison/HQ: Vilnius
- Nickname: TRADOC

Commanders
- Current commander: Colonel Mindaugas Steponavičius

The Training and Doctrine Command (TRADOC) is a training-oriented formation in the Lithuanian Armed Forces, focused on implementing military training policy in the National Defence System (NDS). The main objectives of TRADOC are to conduct the individual training of soldiers and organize personnel training of the NDS. It is also responsible for developing doctrine documents of the LAF in the military field.

== TRADOC History ==
The Training and Personnel Command (TRAPEC) under the Ministry of National Defence was established by order of Minister Česlovas Stankevičius on 6 August 1998. Colonel Romas Žibas was appointed as the deputy commander of TRAPEC, and on 17 August, the permanent structure of the organization comprising 50 personnel positions was approved. TRAPEC was organized at the facilities of the Defence Staff before being moved in February 1999 to separate facilities in 21 Sapiegos Street. On 25 June 1999, Stankevičius renamed TRAPEC to TRADOC. On 20 October of that year, Colonel Žibas was appointed as the TRADOC commander. On 20 February 2002, the Jaeger School (renamed in 2006 as the Reconnaissance School) was subordinated to TRADOC. On 1 September 2008 the Joint Staff undertook the control functions and combat training of Lithuanian Armed Forces Military Units from TRADOC (by Order No. V-630 of 2 July 2008 of the Minister of National Defence). By 31 December 2008 the TRADOC had conducted administration functions of compulsory basic military service of the reserve officers. The Military Personnel Department was subordinated to TRADOC on 1 April 2010. From 14 February to 1 April 2011 TRADOC temporarily took over functions related with military drafting.

== Heads ==
- Colonel Romas Žibas (30 August 2004)
- Colonel Jonas Vytautas Žukas (31 August 2004 – 2 January 2008)
- Colonel Jurgis Norgėla (2 January 2008 – 24 May 2010)
- Colonel Gintaras Ažubalis (31 July 2010-?)
- Colonel Mindaugas Steponavičius (since 2019)

== Structure ==
TRADOC consists of the following:

- TRADOC Staff
  - Doctrine Division
  - Individual Training Division
  - Collective Training Division
  - Lessons Learned Division
  - English Language Testing Division
  - G1
  - G2/5
  - G4/6
- Division General Stasys Raštikis Lithuanian Armed Forces School
  - Staff
  - Training Section
  - Non-commissioned Officers School
  - Logistics Training Centre
  - Communications and Information Systems Training Centre
  - Parachute Training Centre
  - Physical Training Centre
  - Drone Training Centre
  - Training Battalion
  - Supply Service
- Great Lithuanian Hetman Jonušas Radvila Training Regiment
  - Staff and Support Units
  - 1st Training Battalion (Kazlų Rūda)
  - 2nd Training Battalion (Rukla)
- General Adolfas Ramanauskas Combat Training Centre
  - HQ Bureau
  - Staff
  - Staff and Supply Company
  - Security Section
  - Combat Training Group
  - UAV Warfare Company "Vanagas"
  - Supply Service
  - Gaižiūnai Training Area
  - General Kazys Veverskis Training Area
  - General Silvestras Žukauskas Training Area
  - Rūdninkai Training Area
- Military Institute

=== Great Lithuanian Hetman Jonušas Radvila Training Regiment ===
The Training Regiment prepares active reserve of the LAF, upcoming soldiers of professional military service and guarantees the activity of Gaižiūnai Training Area. The Training Regiment is considered to be the gateway to join Lithuanian Armed Forces. The freshmen cadets of the Military Academy also get their initial military training in the Training Regiment.

=== Division General Stasys Raštikis Lithuanian Armed Forces School ===
Its purpose is to prepare of NCOs and military specialists in all branches of the Lithuanian Armed Forces in career and specialty courses. It also prepares soldiers from other countries. Kazlų Rūdos Training Centre is subordinate to the school.

=== General Adolfas Ramanauskas Combat Training Centre ===
The Combat Training Centre develops, organizes and conducts military combat training for international operations. The Pabradė Training Area is subordinate to the Combat Training Centre.

== See also ==
- General Jonas Žemaitis Military Academy of Lithuania
- United States Army Training and Doctrine Command
- Malaysian Army Training and Doctrine Command
