= Germany–Lithuania relations =

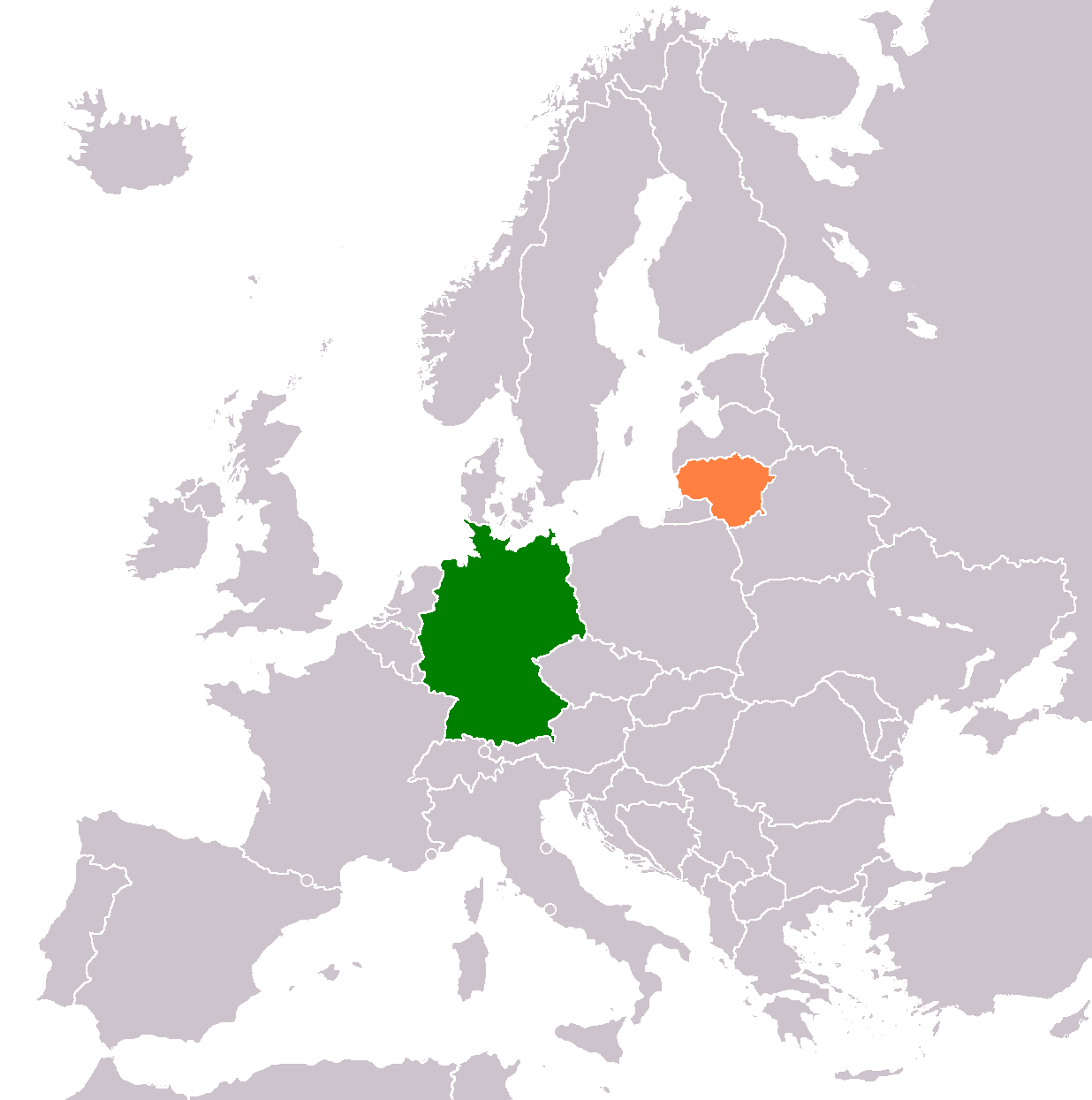

- Germany: Lithuania

Germany–Lithuania relations are the bilateral relations between Germany and Lithuania. The formal diplomatic relations existed from 1918 to 1944 and again since 1991. Both countries are members of the Council of the Baltic Sea States, the Organization for Security and Cooperation in Europe (OSCE), OECD, the Council of Europe, NATO and the European Union. Lithuania has also been part of the Eurozone since 2015. The relationship is described as close and reliable partnership. Germany gave full support to Lithuania's applications for membership in the European Union and NATO.

Bilateral defense cooperation between the two countries reached a milestone in 2025, with the deployment of Germany's 45th Panzer Brigade to Lithuania.

== History ==
=== Medieval period ===
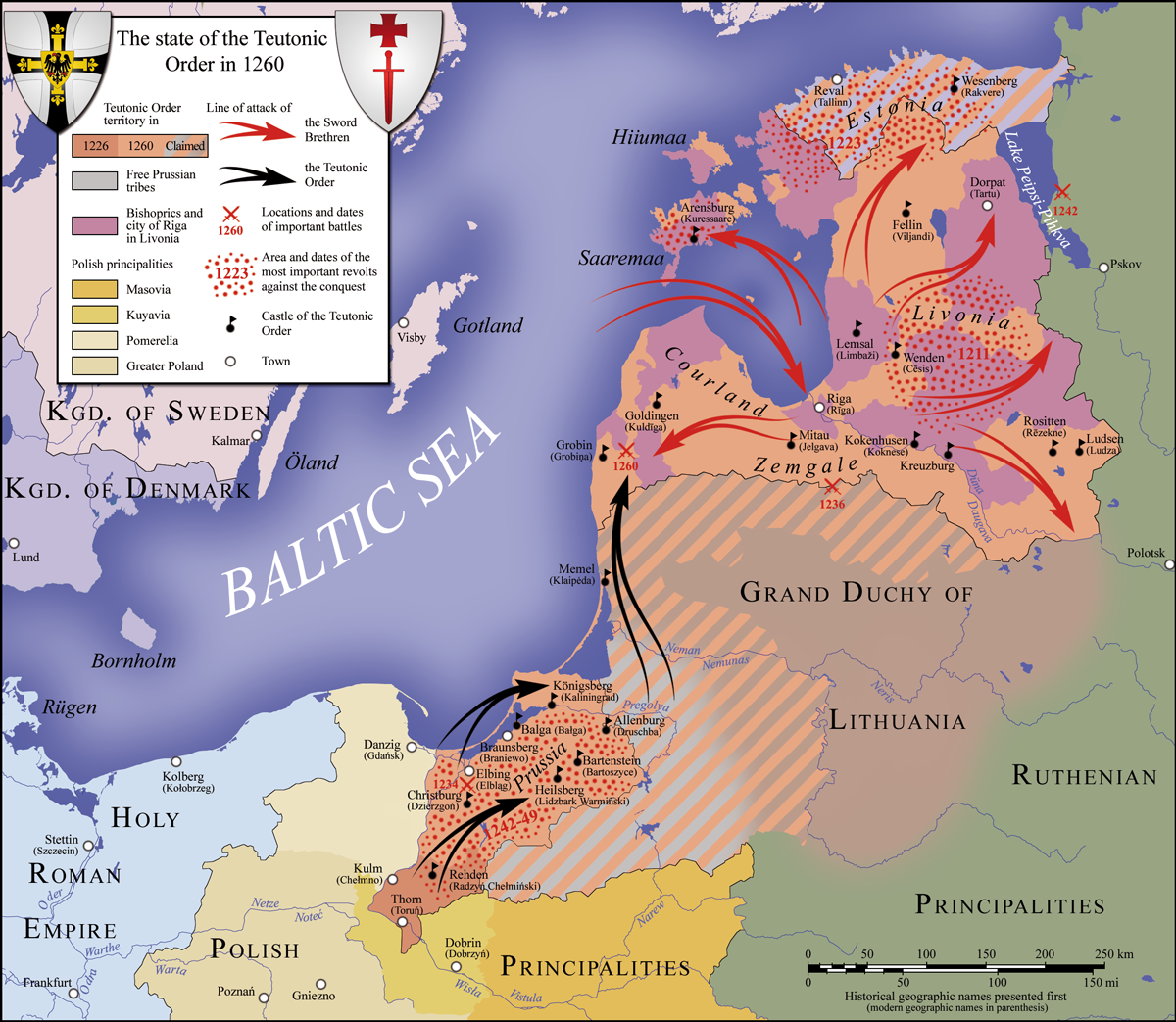
Expansion of the Teutonic order in the 1200s.

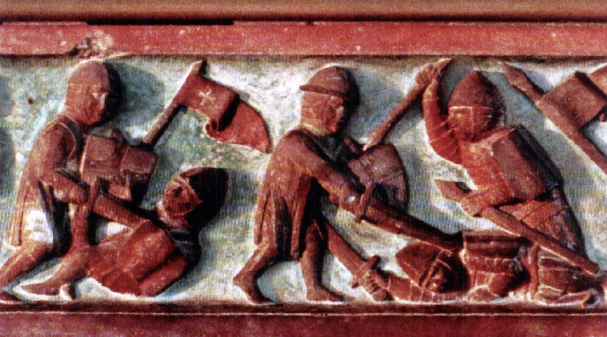
Lithuanians fighting Teutonic Knights on a 14th-century bas-relief from Malbork Castle, Poland

The name Lithuania (as Litua) first appears in written sources in 1009 in the Quedlinburg Annals in connection with the monk Bruno of Querfurt, who wanted to convert the local people to Christianity. Western powers considered the Baltic Lithuanians as the last stronghold of European paganism, potential missionary territory of the Church and expansion territory of the Livonian and Teutonic knightly nobility. However, the Lithuanians were able to successfully assert themselves against the Lithuanian Crusade, launched by the Teutonic Order in 1283. This self-assertion of the Lithuanians, who formed a powerful medieval state, is an important reason for the different development of the German settlements in Lithuania compared to the Baltic Germans in Estonia and Latvia: while the Baltic Germans immigrated in the course of the conquests of the Teutonic Order in the 13th and 14th centuries and formed a leading class, the Lithuanian Germans came to the country only later and formed an often rather peasant ethnic minority group.

Lithuania became an ally of Poland in the Polish–Teutonic War of 1326–1332. Constant threat from the Teutonic Knights, eventually led the Grand Duchy of Lithuania to establish a personal union with the Kingdom of Poland in 1385, and accept Christianity from Poland. Despite the Christianization of Lithuania, the Teutonic Knights occupied its western region of Samogitia in 1398. In the Battle of Grunwald (1410), the combined Polish–Lithuanian army defeated the Teutonic Order, which established Poland–Lithuania as a major power in Central Europe and started the decline of the Teutonic Order. Samogitia was restored to Lithuania.

=== Early modern period ===
The union with Poland was consolidated with the Union of Lublin in 1569. Therefore, until the end of the Polish–Lithuanian Commonwealth, there was a largely common history also in the relations with the German states. In the Peace of Oliva, Poland–Lithuania had to cede, among other things, the Duchy of Prussia, with a sizeable Lithuanian population, living in its Lithuania Minor region, to Brandenburg, which from the 18th century formed part of the Kingdom of Prussia. In 1724, King Frederick William I of Prussia prohibited Samogitians, Poles and Jews from settling in Lithuania Minor, and initiated German colonization to change the region's ethnic composition.

The continuing internal and external decline of the state led to Lithuania (and Poland) disappearing from the map in 1795 after several partitions - undertaken by Prussia along with Russia and Austria - with the bulk of Lithuania being annexed by the Russian Empire, and small portions by Prussia and Austria, which after 1815 also passed to Russia. In the 19th century, despite several uprisings against the Russian regime, Lithuanian culture was increasingly threatened by Russification. Cultural contact with Lithuania Minor in the province of East Prussia helped preserve the Lithuanian culture, as the Lithuanian book smugglers supplied Lithuanian books printed in Latin script (which were forbidden in the Tsarist Empire at that time) across the Prussian-Russian border at great risk. At the same time the population of Lithuania Minor was subjected to Germanisation policies.

=== 20th century ===
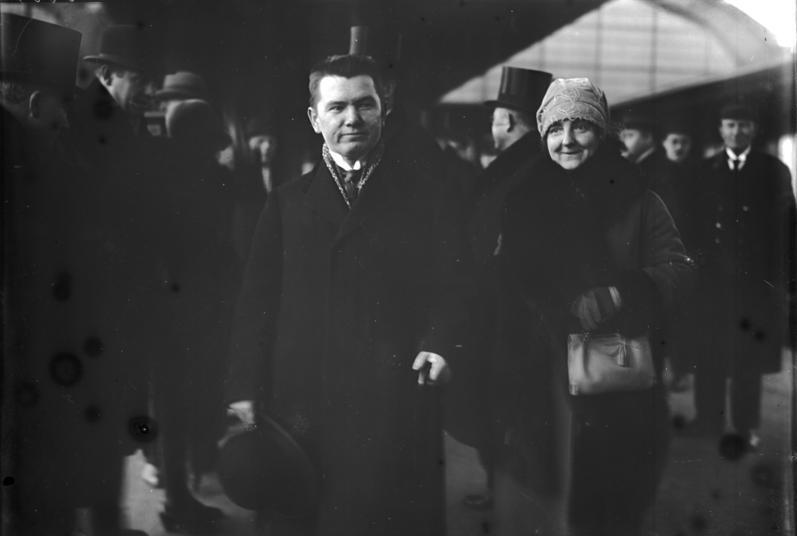
Lithuanian Prime Minister Augustinas Voldemaras arrived in Berlin in 1928 to conclude a trade agreement.

During World War I, the German Empire, as an adversary of Russia, occupied Lithuania and some neighbouring territories in 1915 and combined them into the administrative unit of Ober Ost. Towards the end of the war, Germany wanted to recognize Lithuania as a sovereign state only if it entered into economic and military union with the Reich. On 11 December 1917, the Council of Lithuania declared the restoration of the "independent" state of Lithuania with Vilnius as its capital and with ties to the German Empire. Since Germany delayed the recognition, on 16 February 1918, the Council again proclaimed Lithuania's independence without any ties to the other states, thus forming the Republic of Lithuania. Subsequently, Lithuanians were able to defend their state during the Lithuanian Wars of Independence. In 1923 Lithuania annexed the Klaipėda Region, i.e. a portion of historic Lithuania Minor in East Prussia north of the Neman River, formerly part of the German Empire, with the port city of Memel (today Klaipėda), which had been administered by the League of Nations since the end of the War. In 1924, this annexation was recognized by the previous protecting powers. Apart from the problem of the Klaipėda Region, German–Lithuanian relations in the interwar period developed quite positively to some extent, the two states being bound together by their dislike of Poland, to which both had territorial claims.

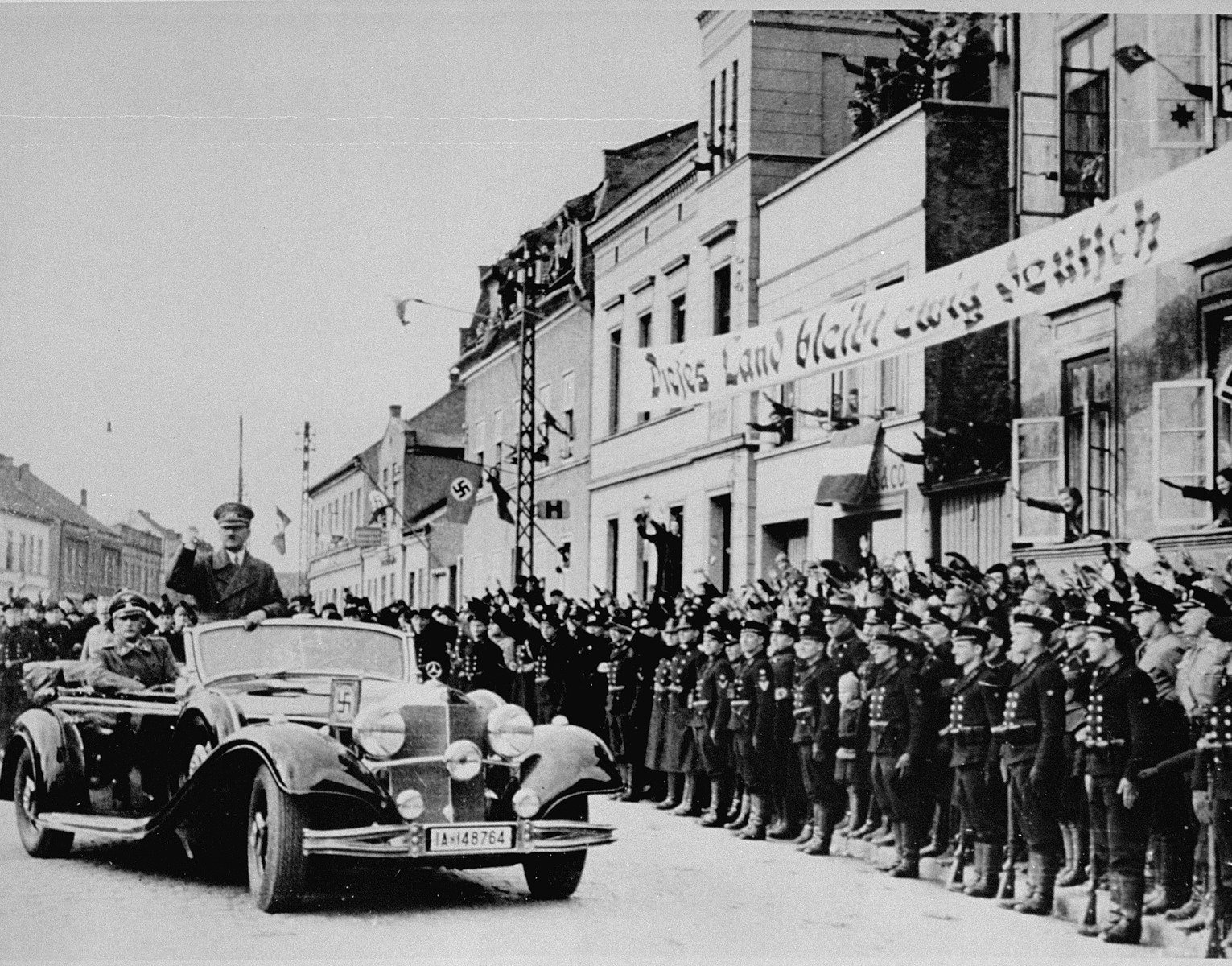
Visit of Adolf Hitler following the German annexation of Klaipėda, March 1939

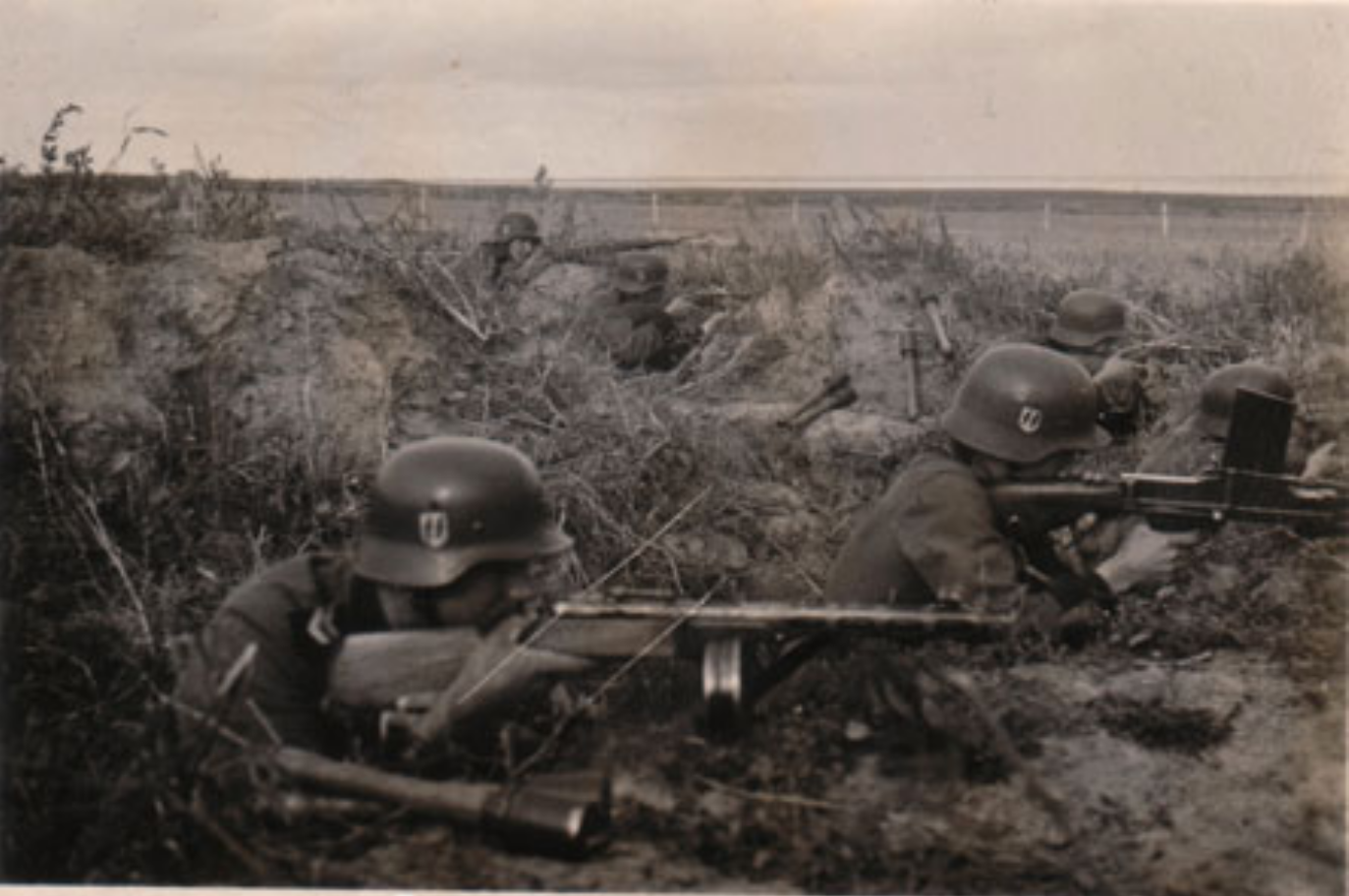
Lithuanian Waffen SS soldiers on the Eastern Front, 1943 late November

After the Nazi takeover in March 1933, tensions began to rise again, reaching a climax with the Trial of Neumann and Sass in 1934, when the Lithuanian government arrested dozens of German pro-Nazi activists. Following the 1939 German ultimatum, Lithuania had to cede the Klaipėda Region back to Germany. In the Molotov–Ribbentrop Pact, Lithuania had initially been assigned to the German sphere of influence. After the outbreak of World War II, however, there was a revision of this treaty by the German–Soviet Boundary and Friendship Treaty with a change in the spheres of influence. Germany received parts of central Poland, while Lithuania was awarded to the Soviet Union. On 15 June 1940, the Red Army invaded and occupied Lithuania. As late as 1941, many Lithuanian Germans were resettled in the German sphere of influence. After the Operation Barbarossa, from 1941 to 1945, Lithuania was entirely occupied by the Wehrmacht and belonged to the Reichskommissariat Ostland. During this period, Germans and Lithuanian collaborators committed crimes against humanity against opposition members and minorities, chiefly Jews and Poles. Lithuanian Jews fell victim to the Holocaust, and 95% of them didn't survive the war. Germany operated the Kauen concentration camp and various Nazi prisons, forced labour camps and prisoner-of-war camps for Allied POWs in occupied Lithuania. In Lithuania, attempts were made to implement the so-called Kegelbahn project, i.e. the targeted settlement of certain conquered territories with German resettlers. From 1944 on, most of the Germans fled from the reapproaching Red Army or were expelled soon after. Thousands of Lithuanians fled with the Germans to the West. For the exiled Lithuanians who settled in West Germany, the Lithuanian grammar school in Hüttenfeld in southern Hesse formed a cultural preservation center. Expelled Lithuanian-Germans united in 1951 in the Landsmannschaft der Deutschen aus Litauen (Association of Germans from Lithuania).

Lithuania, alike East Germany, fell to the Soviets, although it has regained its main port city of Klaipėda. German–Lithuanian contacts were only possible to a very limited extent during the Cold War.

Lithuania restored its independence on 11 March 1990. In the early 1990s, Germany opposed Lithuanian independence from the Soviet Union, with Chancellor Helmut Kohl stating that Lithuania should wait 10 more years before declaring independence. In 1991, Germany's protest following the January Events, in which the Soviet military attacked unarmed Lithuanian civilians, were reserved. Germany recognized the independence of Lithuania and the other two Baltic States on 27 August 1991. In the following period, Germany's policy towards Lithuania oscillated between the willingness and obligation to integrate the Baltic States into the European structures and the fear of thereby angering Russia or disrupting its rapprochement with Europe. At times, Germany was even considered the main opposing voice among the Western powers with regard to NATO accession.

=== 21st century ===
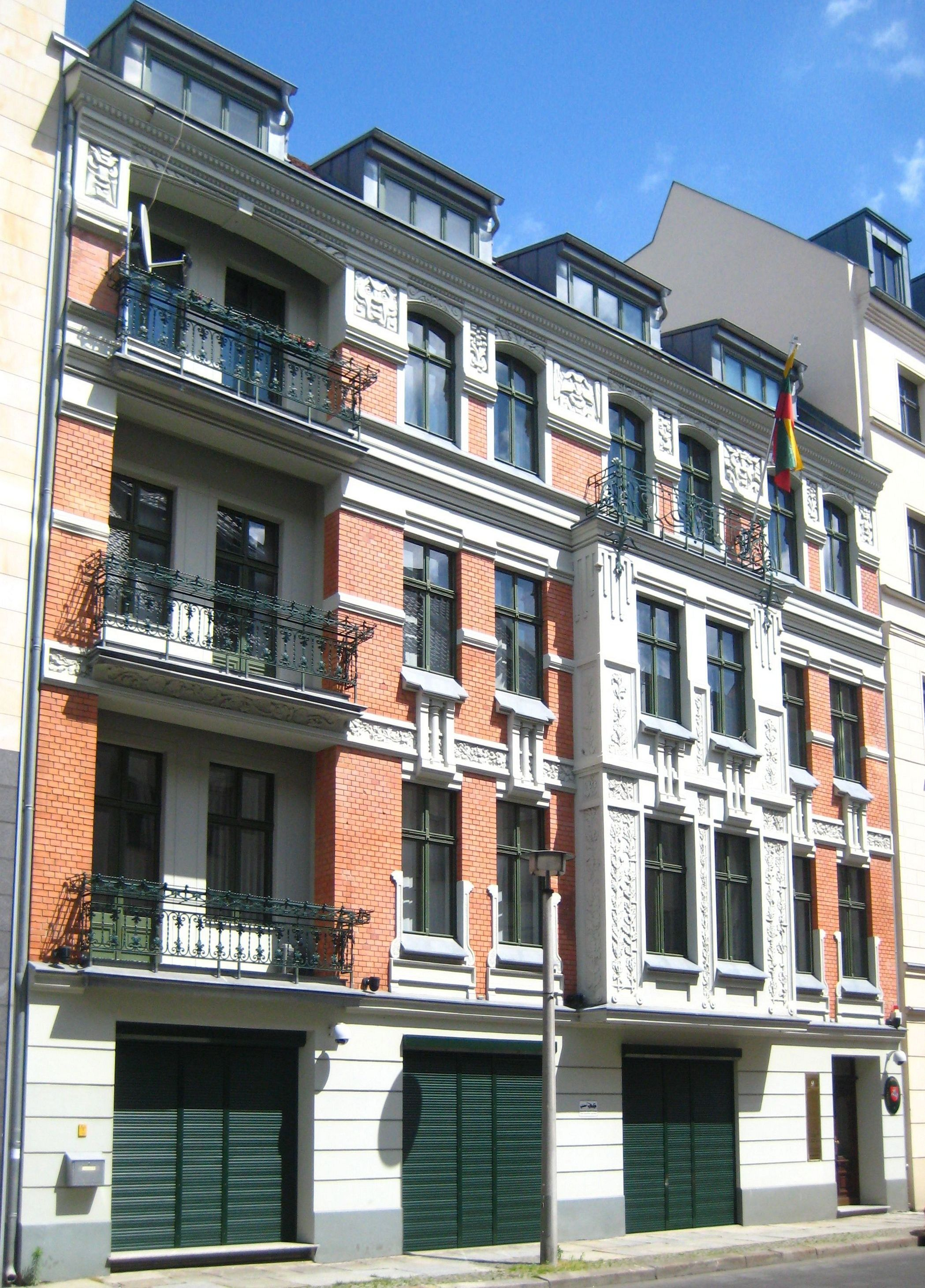
Embassy of Lithuania in Berlin

In 2004, Lithuania joined NATO and the European Union. This marked a new relationship between Germany and Lithuania, especially within the European structures.

Following the Russian invasion of Crimea in 2014, the NATO Enhanced Forward Presence was established in the Baltic States, with Germany assuming the responsibility to lead the multinational battle group in Lithuania. The security situation in Europe further deteriorated after the 2022 Russian invasion of Ukraine. The Baltic States requested their NATO allies to increase the military presence in the region. In 2023, the military cooperation between the states reached a new level when Germany agreed to deploy the 45th Panzer Brigade of Bundeswehr in Lithuania on a permanent basis.

Bilateral defense cooperation reached a milestone in 2025 with the deployment of Germany’s 45th Panzer Brigade to Lithuania. The move, widely welcomed by the Lithuanian public, was seen as a significant gesture of solidarity within NATO and marked a new chapter in German-Lithuanian strategic ties.

== Economic relations ==
For Lithuania, Germany is an important trade and investment partner. According to the United Nations Comtrade database on international trade, in 2022, Lithuania exported goods to Germany for over 3.6 billion euros, while Germany exported goods to Lithuania for over 5.5 billion euros. Both countries trade mainly industrial goods.

== Military Ties ==
In May 2025, German Chancellor Friedrich Merz and Defence Minister Boris Pistorius conducted the formal stand-up ceremony of the German 45th Panzer Brigade "Litauen" in Vilnius. The brigade represents the first permanent German combat formation stationed abroad since World War II and marks a significant deepening of bilateral defense cooperation. The unit is scheduled to reach 2,000 personnel by mid-2026, with integration of NATO’s Enhanced Forward Presence (eFP) battlegroup and combat battalions from Germany.

== Diaspora ==
In 2021, over 54,000 Lithuanian citizens lived in Germany, making Germany one of the most important destination for Lithuanian immigrants within the EU. Historically, a large Baltic German minority lived in Lithuania, most of which was expelled after the Soviet occupation. According to the 2021 census, just under 2000 Germans still lived in Lithuania.

== Diplomatic missions ==
- Germany has an embassy in Vilnius.
- Lithuania has an embassy in Berlin.

== See also ==
- Foreign relations of Germany
- Foreign relations of Lithuania
