= Markus Laubenthal =

German army general

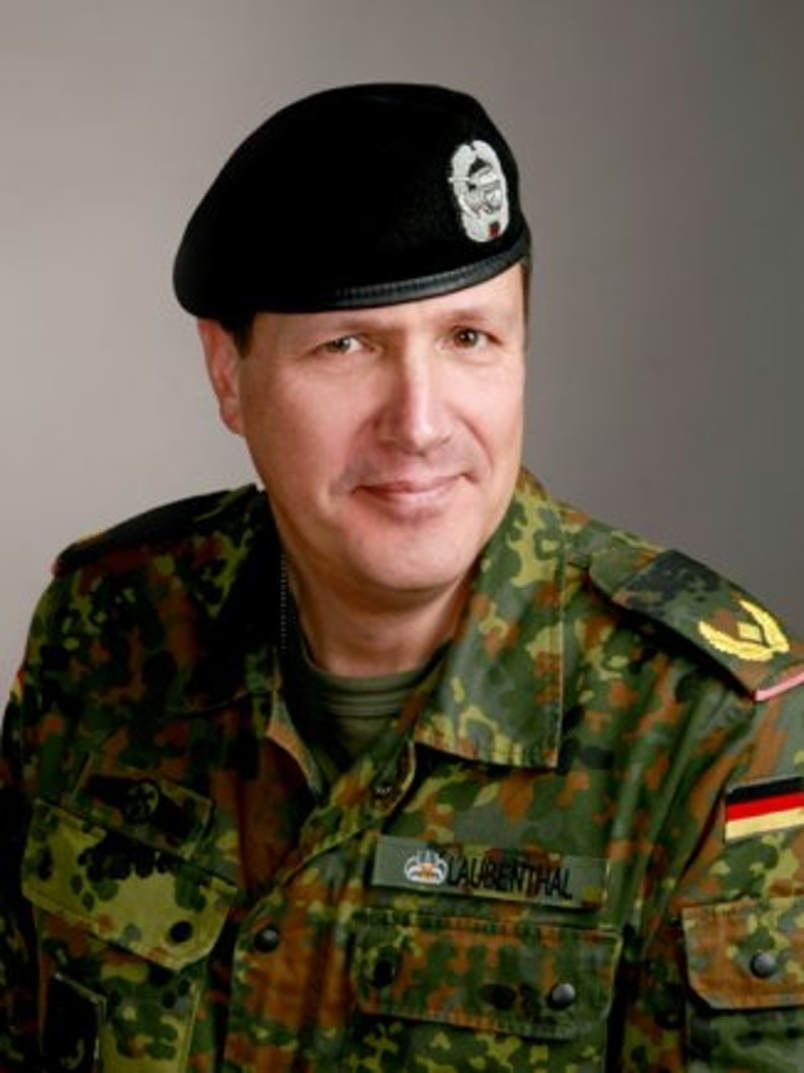
- General Markus Laubenthal (pictured as a one star)
- Born: 4 December 1962 (age 63); Aachen, West Germany
- Allegiance: West Germany (to 1990); Germany
- Branch: German Army
- Service years: 1982–present
- Rank: General
- Commands: 1st Panzer Division; 12th Panzer Brigade; 203rd Panzer Battalion
- Conflicts: War in Afghanistan
- Awards: Legion of Merit
- Alma mater: Bundeswehr Command and Staff College; Joint Services Command and Staff College; King's College London (MA)

Markus Laubenthal (born 4 December 1962) is a German Army general who has served as the chief of staff of Supreme Headquarters Allied Powers Europe since 2024. Among his previous commands, he was notably the Deputy Inspector General of the Bundeswehr from 2020 to 2024, and the commander of the 1st Panzer Division from 2017 to 2018. He was also the first non-American chief of staff of the United States Army Europe, from 2014 to 2017.

== Military career ==
Laubenthal became a conscript in the West German army in 1982. He received training as an officer of the Armored Corps, and later was a member of the 40th class of the Bundeswehr Command and Staff College from 1997 to 1999, and attended the British Joint Services Command and Staff College from 2001 to 2002. Laubenthal also has a Master of Arts degree in defense studies from King's College London. As an Army officer he held commands at every level, including a platoon and two tank companies, before serving in the Kosovo Force, including as its assistant chief of staff in Pristina, from 2002 to 2003. Laubenthal then led the 203rd Panzer Battalion from 2003 to 2005 in Westphalia, Germany.

He also held staff positions, including as an operations officer for the Airmobile Division and the Army Forces Command. He was also the head of European and African Affairs in the Policy Planning Staff to the German Minister of Defense, and in 2011 he became the head of Defense and Strategic Guidelines. Laubenthal commanded the 12th Panzer Brigade from 2012 to 2014, during which time he deployed to Afghanistan as part of the Resolute Support Mission. In August 2013, he took over as chief of staff for ISAF Regional Command North in Afghanistan, where he helped oversee the drawdown of German troops from Kunduz and Mazar-e-Sharif. In August 2014, he became the chief of staff of United States Army Europe, making him the first non-American in the post. He served in that role until January 2017, and was succeeded by another German general. Laubenthal was awarded the Legion of Merit.

From 2017 to 2018 he was the commander of the 1st Panzer Division in Oldenburg, Germany, and then served as Director General for Forces Policy in the German Federal Ministry of Defence from 2018 to 2020. Laubenthal was then the Deputy Inspector General of the Bundeswehr from 2020 to 2024, before being appointed as chief of staff of Supreme Headquarters Allied Powers Europe.

== Personal life ==
Laubenthal is married and has a daughter.

Military offices
Preceded by André Bodemann	Commander of the 12th Panzer Brigade; 2012–2014	Succeeded by Stephan Thomas
Preceded by	Chief of Staff of United States Army Europe; 2014–2017	Succeeded by Kai Rohrschneider
Preceded by Johann Langenegger	Commander of the 1st Panzer Division; 2017–2018	Succeeded by Jürgen-Joachim von Sandrart
Preceded by Joachim Rühle	Deputy Inspector General of the Bundeswehr; 2020–2024	Succeeded by Andreas Hoppe
Preceded by Joachim Rühle	Chief of Staff of Supreme Headquarters Allied Powers Europe; 2024–present	Incumbent
