= 4th Panzergrenadier Division (Bundeswehr) =

Coordinates: 49.005871°N 12.114093°E

- 4. Panzergrenadierdivision
- 4th Panzergrenadier Division insignia
- Active: July 1956 – 31 March 1994
- Country: West Germany (1956-1990); Germany (1990-1994)
- Type: Panzergrenadier
- Role: Mechanized infantry
- Part of: German II Corps
- Garrison/HQ: Regensburg

The 4th Panzergrenadier Division (4. Panzergrenadierdivision) was a West German mechanized infantry formation. It was part of the II Corps of the Bundeswehr, which also incorporated in 1979 the 1st Mountain Division and 1st Airborne Division, and the 10th Panzer Division. II Corps was part of NATO's Central Army Group (CENTAG), along with the Bundeswehr's III Corps and the American V and VII Corps. In the wake of military restructuring brought about by the end of the Cold War, the 4th Panzergrenadier Division was disbanded in 1994 with some of its forces being used to form the Airmobile Forces Command /4th Division.

The division was constituted from federal border police troops in July 1956 as the 4th Grenadier Division as part of the II Corps (then called "Army Staff II") of the Bundeswehr. At that time, it commanded the "A4" and "B4" battle-groups. In 1958 it received a third battle-group, "C4". The battle-groups later became the 12th Panzer, 11th Panzergrenadier, and 10th Panzergrenadier Brigades. From 1958 to 1959, the 30th Panzer Brigade was part of the division before it was subordinated to the 10th Panzergrenadier (later Panzer) Division. As part of an army reorganization in 1959, the division was renamed the 4th Panzergrenadier Division. Division headquarters was quartered at Regensburg.

In 1970, the division was renamed the 4th Jäger (light infantry) Division. The division once again became the 4th Panzergrenadier Division in 1980. Following the end of the Cold War, elements of the 4th Panzergrenadier and 1st Airborne Divisions were combined and designated Airmobile Forces Command /4th Division.

== Commanders ==
Nr.	Name	Start of command	End of command
14	Generalmajor Jürgen Reichardt	1989	1994
13	Generalmajor Kurt Barthel	1985	1989
12	Generalmajor Wolfgang Odendahl	1982	1985
11	Generalmajor Gerhard Wachter	1980	1982
10	Generalmajor Gert Kohlmann	1974	1980
9	Generalmajor Rüdiger von Reichert	1971	1974
8	Brigadegeneral Joachim-Frithjof Lindner	1970	1971
7	Generalmajor Helmut Schönefeld	1968	1970
6	Generalmajor Helmut Grashey	1966	1968
5	Generalmajor Johannes Härtel	1964	1966
4	Generalmajor Friedrich Alfred Übelhack	1959	1964
3	Generalmajor Hellmuth Laegeler	1957	1959
2	Generalmajor Kurt Spitzer	1956	1957
1	Brigadegeneral Hans Höffner	1956	1956
