= Franco-German Brigade =

Special military brigade of the Eurocorps

Coordinates: 47°48′58.61″N 7°37′16.27″E

- French: Brigade Franco-Allemande; German: Deutsch-Französische Brigade
- Coat of arms of the Franco-German Brigade
- Active: 2 October 1989 – present
- Country: France; West Germany (1989–1990); Germany (1990–present)
- Branch: French Army; German Army
- Type: Mechanized infantry
- Size: 1 brigade (5,980)
- Part of: 1st Division and 10th Panzer Division
- Garrison/HQ: Müllheim, Baden-Württemberg, Germany
- Mottos: Le devoir d'excellence Dem Besten verpflichtet ("Devoted to excellence")

Commanders
- Current commander: Brigadier General François-Xavier Elias

The Franco-German Brigade (French: Brigade Franco-Allemande; German: Deutsch-Französische Brigade) is a special military brigade of the Eurocorps, founded in 1989, jointly consisting of units from both the French Army and the German Army.

== History ==
The Brigade was formed in 1987 following a summit between President Mitterrand of France and Chancellor Kohl of Germany. The Brigade became operational on 2 October 1989, under the command of General Jean-Pierre Sengeisen. Currently, the FGB is stationed at Müllheim, Metz, Donaueschingen, Illkirch-Graffenstaden, Sarrebourg, and Stetten am Kalten Markt as part of the Eurocorps.

In February 2009 it was announced that a German battalion of the force was to be moved to Illkirch near Strasbourg, the first time a German unit had been stationed in France since the German occupation of World War II.

On 31 October 2013, France announced that in 2014 it would inactivate the 110th Infantry Regiment based in Donaueschingen and thus withdraw around 1000 men from Germany. This would leave the brigade with 4000 men, but would put an end to each country having a major presence in the other, France would be left with ~500 troops in Germany and vice versa.

Since 2016, French units are part of 1st Division and German units are part of 10th Panzer Division.

== Organisation ==
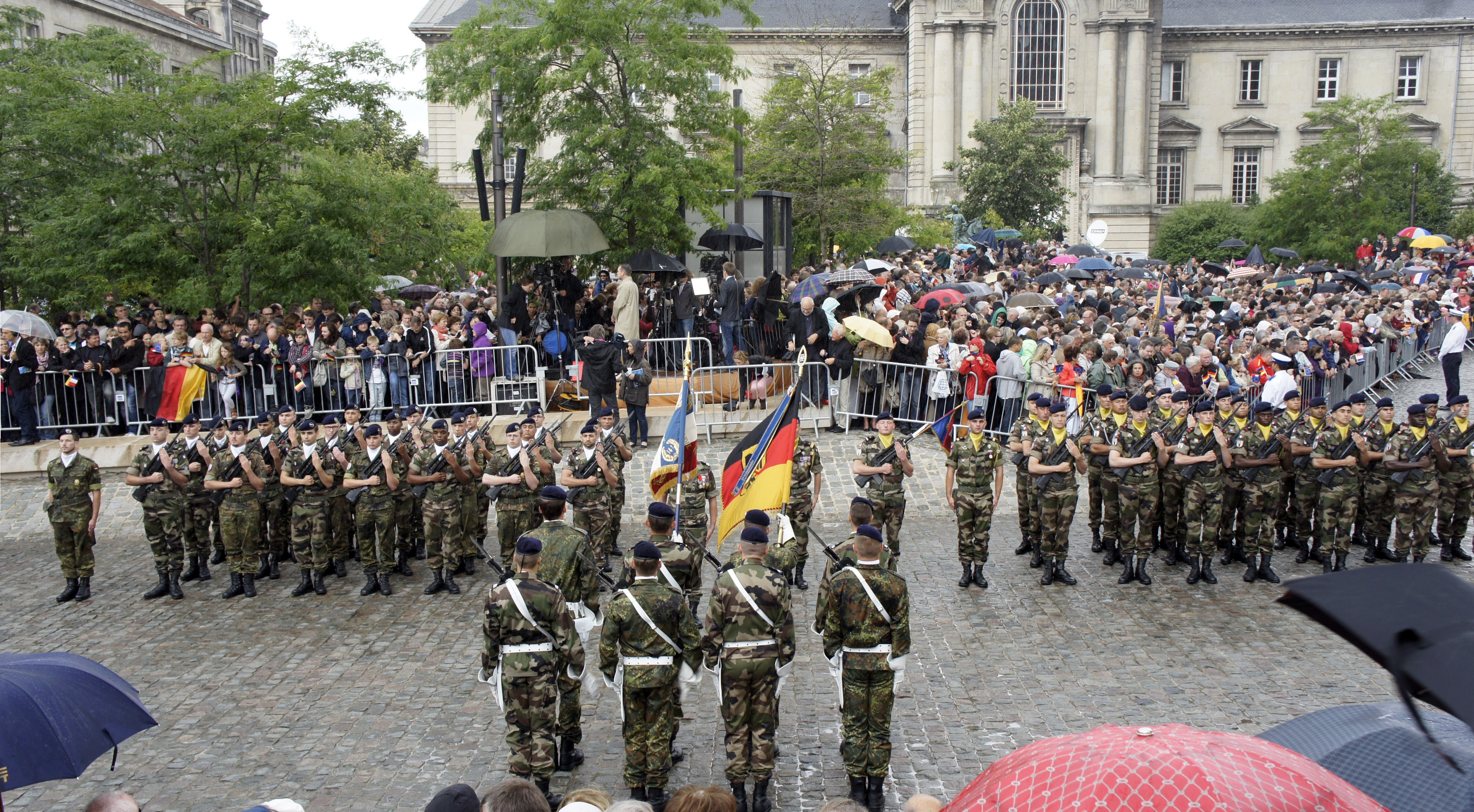
The Franco-German Brigade parade in Reims in honor of the 50th anniversary of Franco-German friendship

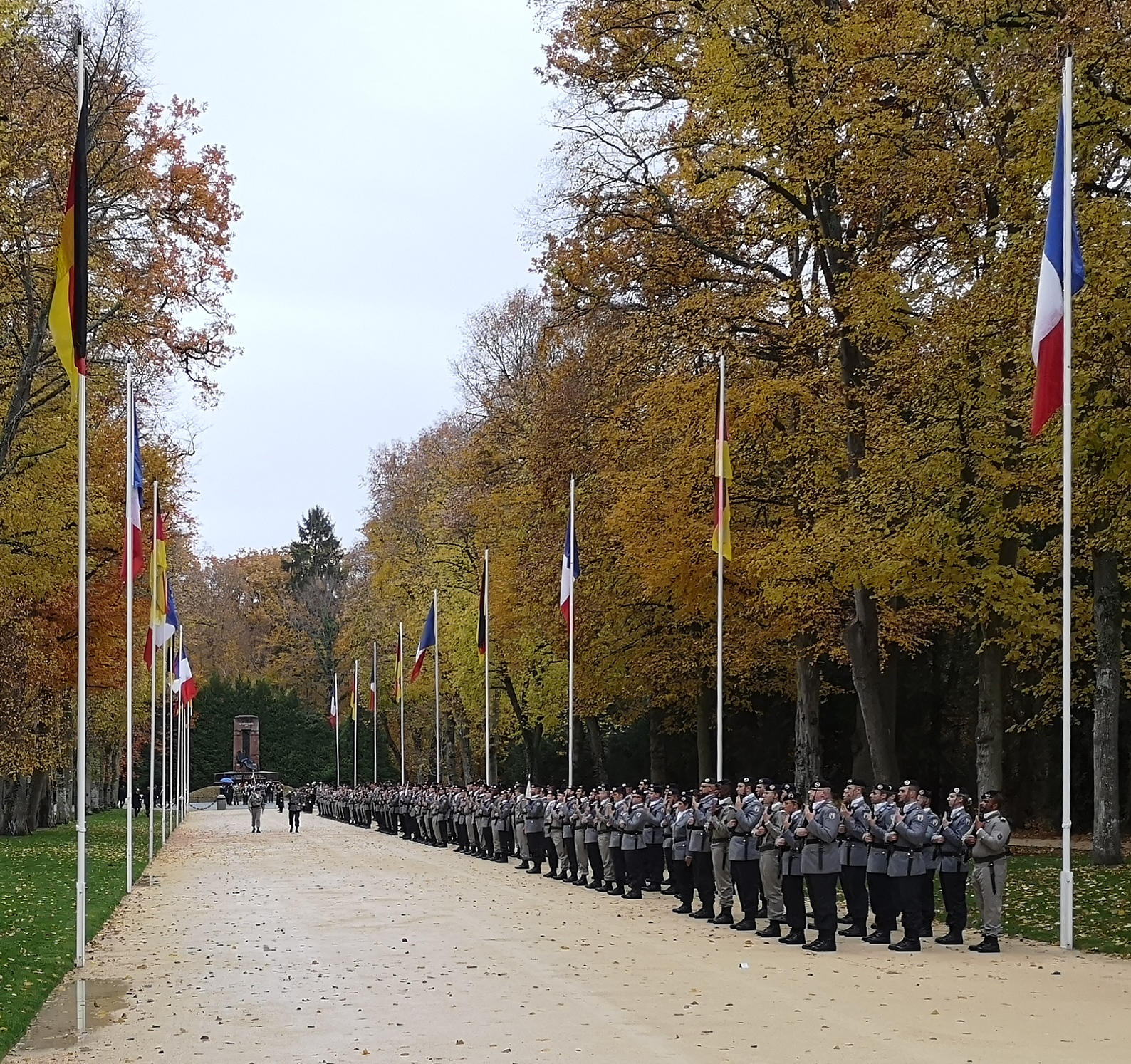
Franco-German brigade at the Glade of the Armistice

The Franco-German brigade can be described as a mechanised formation; its combat units are an armoured reconnaissance regiment, three infantry battalions, and an artillery regiment. The logistical support unit and the brigade's HQ have mixed complements drawn from both countries.

- (France) (Germany) Staff, in Müllheim (D)
- (France) 3e Régiment de Hussards (3e RH) (3rd Hussards Regiment), barracks Séré-de-Rivières in Metz (F)
  - 1st Reconnaissance Company
  - 2nd Reconnaissance Company
  - 3rd Reconnaissance Company
  - 4th Light Reconnaissance and Anti-Armour Company
  - 5th Supply and Support Company
  - 6th Combat Service Support Company
- (France) 1^{er} Régiment d'Infanterie (1^{er} RI) - Infantry Regiment in Sarrebourg (F)
  - 1st Infantry Company
  - 2nd Infantry Company
  - 3rd Infantry Company
  - 4th Reconnaissance and Combat Support Company
  - 5th Supply and Support Company
  - 6th Combat Service Support Company
- (Germany) Jägerbataillon 291 (291st Light Infantry Battalion), in Illkirch-Graffenstaden (F)
  - 1st HQ & Supply Company
  - 2nd Light Infantry Company
  - 3rd Light Infantry Company
  - 4th Reconnaissance Company
- (Germany) Jägerbataillon 292 (292nd Light Infantry Battalion), in Donaueschingen (D)
  - 1st HQ & Supply Company
  - 2nd Light Infantry Company
  - 3rd Light Infantry Company
  - 4th Light Infantry Company
  - 5th Heavy Infantry Company (8x 120mm Mortars, and 8x TOW Anti-Tank, 8x MK20 Fire Support and 6x Reconnaissance Wiesel Armoured Weapons Carriers)
  - 6th Combat Service Support Company
- (Germany) Artilleriebataillon 295 (295th Artillery Battalion), in Stetten am kalten Markt (D)
  - 1st HQ & Supply Battery
  - 2nd Self-Propelled Howitzer Artillery Battery with PzH 2000
  - 3rd Self-Propelled Howitzer Artillery Battery with PzH 2000
  - 4th Rocket Artillery Battery with MLRS
  - 5th Target Acquisition Battery with radars (COBRA), UAV (KZO) and weather platoon.
  - 6th basic training company
- (Germany) Panzerpionierkompanie 550 (550th Armoured Engineer Company), in Stetten am kalten Markt (D)
- (France) (Germany) Logistic Battalion (French: Bataillon de Commandement et de Soutien German: Deutsch-Französisches Versorgungsbataillon), in Müllheim (D)
  - 1st HQ & Supply Company (bi-national)
  - 2nd Supply Company (bi-national)
  - 3rd Maintenance Company (bi-national)
  - 4th Transport Company (German)
  - Combat Service Support Company (French)
  - Staff Company Franco-German Brigade (bi-national)

== See also ==
- 1st Parachute Chasseur Regiment
- Combined Joint Expeditionary Force (CJEF)
- Eurocorps
- Franco-British Defence and Security Cooperation Treaty and Downing Street Declaration
- French Foreign Legion
- List of French paratrooper units
- NATO
- European army
