= 12th Panzer Brigade =

- Panzerbrigade 12
- Coat of Arms
- Active: 1 July 1956 – Present
- Country: West Germany (1956-1990); Germany (1990-Present)
- Branch: German Army
- Type: Mechanized brigade
- Size: 5,000 troops
- Part of: 4th Panzergrenadier Division (1956-1994); 13th Panzergrenadier Division (2001-2006); 10th Panzer Division (2006-Present)
- Garrison/HQ: Cham, Germany
- Nickname: Upper Palatinate
- Engagements: Kosovo War: Prizren incident; War in Afghanistan
- Website: https://www.bundeswehr.de/de/organisation/heer/organisation/10-panzerdivision/panzerbrigade-12

Commanders
- Current commander: Colonel Jörg Stenzel
- Notable commanders: Fritz von Korff

Insignia
NATO Map Symbol
12
10

The 12th Panzer Brigade, also known as 12th Panzer Brigade "Upper Palatinate", is a Mechanized brigade of the German Army.

== History ==
=== Cold War ===
The 12th Panzer Brigade was formed on 1 July 1956 in Amberg. It was attached to the 4th Panzergrenadier Division.

=== After German reunification ===
In 1993, the German Federal Minister of Defense awarded the brigade the nickname "Upper Palatinate." On 6 November 2023, the 122nd Panzergrenadier Battalion was transferred to Lithuania in preparation for the formation of the 45th Panzer Brigade. On 11 September 2024, the 131st Panzer Artillery Battalion was transferred to the 12th Panzer Brigade

== Organization ==
As of 2026, 12th Panzer Brigade's current structure is as follows:

- Panzer Brigade 12 (Panzerbrigade 12), in Cham
  - Staff and Support Company Panzer Brigade 12 (Stabs- und Unterstützungskompanie Panzerbrigade 12), in Cham
  - Reconnaissance Battalion 8 (Aufklärungsbataillon 8), in Freyung with Fennek reconnaissance vehicles and KZO drones
  - Mountain Panzer Battalion 8 (Gebirgspanzerbataillon 8), in Pfreimd (Reserve unit, 1 of 3 tank companies active in peacetime and assigned to Panzer Battalion 104)
  - Panzer Battalion 104 (Panzerbataillon 104), in Pfreimd with 44x Leopard 2A6 main battle tanks
  - Panzer Battalion 363 (Panzerbataillon 363), in Hardheim with 44x Leopard 2A6 main battle tanks
  - Panzergrenadier Battalion 112 (Panzergrenadierbataillon 112), in Regen with 44x Puma Infantry fighting vehicles
  - Panzer Artillery Battalion 131 (Panzerartilleriebataillon 131), in Weiden in der Oberpfalz with 16x PzH 2000 155mm self-propelled howitzers, 8x M270 MLRS multiple rocket launch systems, KZO drones and 2x Euro-Art COBRA counter-battery radars — will move to Oberviechtach in 2027
  - Panzer Engineer Battalion 8 (Panzerpionierbataillon 8), in Ingolstadt
  - Supply Battalion 4 (Versorgungsbataillon 4), in Roding
  - Signal Company Panzer Brigade 12 (Fernmeldekompanie Panzerbrigade 12), in Cham
