= Šatrininkai Eldership =

Šatrininkai Eldership Šatrininkų seniūnija
- Eldership
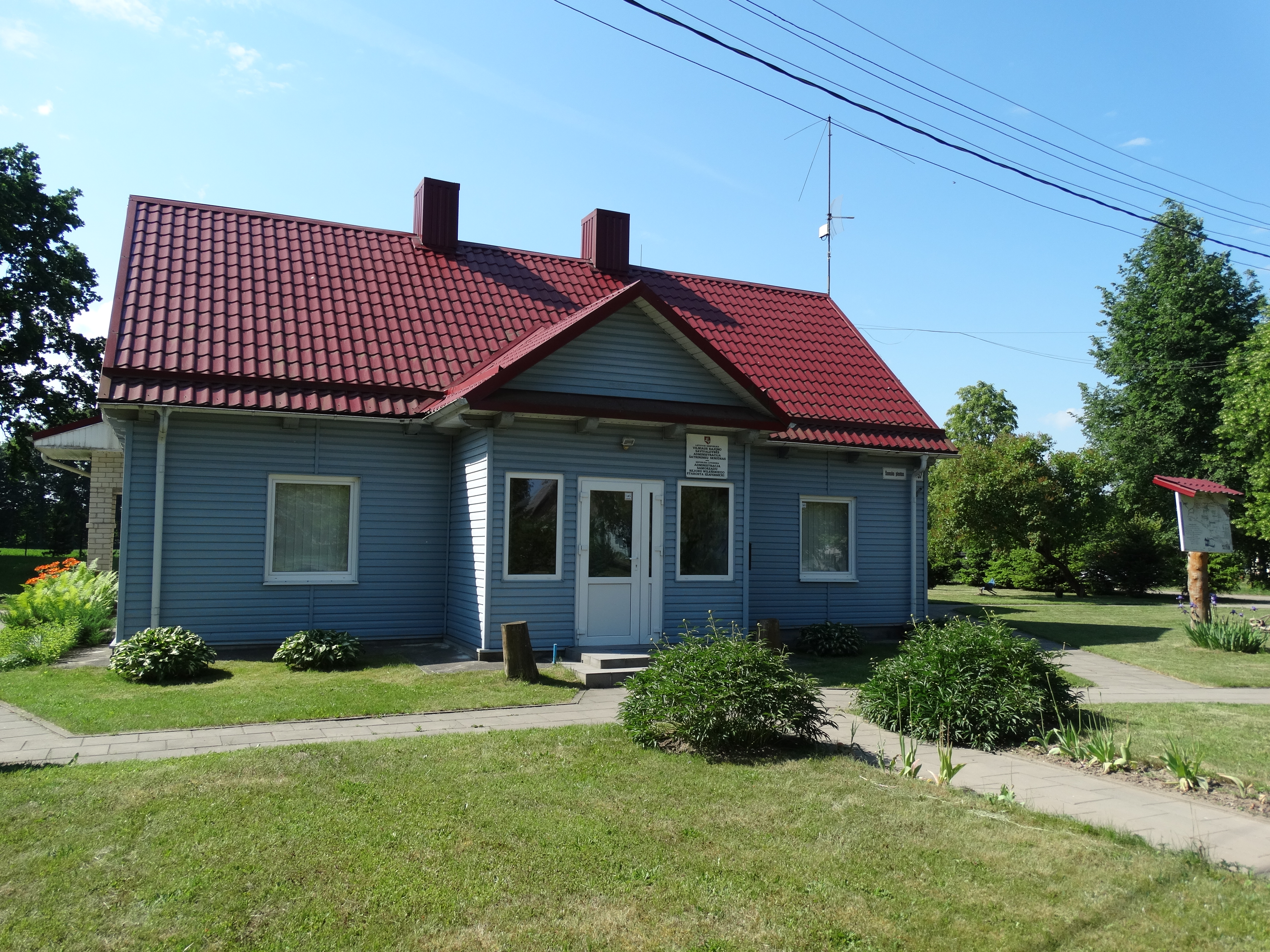
- Administration building

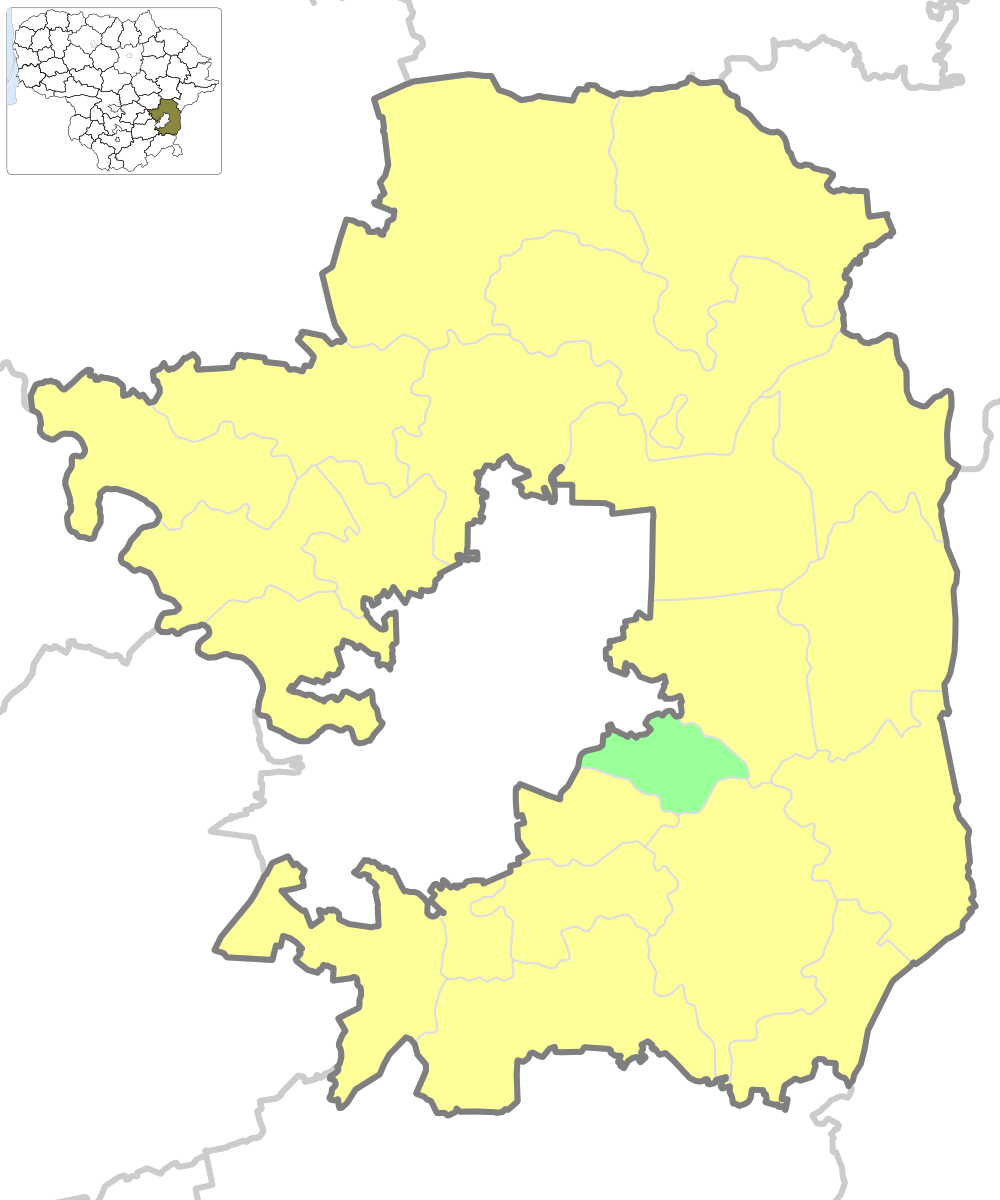
- Location of Šatrininkai Eldership
- Country: Lithuania
- Ethnographic region: Dzūkija
- County: Vilnius County
- Municipality: Vilnius District Municipality
- Administrative centre: Vėliučionys

Area
  - Total: 35 km^{2} (14 sq mi)

Population
  - Total: 2,881
  - Density: 82/km^{2} (210/sq mi)
- Time zone: UTC+2 (EET)
  - Summer (DST): UTC+3 (EEST)
- Website: https://www.vrsa.lt

Šatrininkai Eldership (Lithuanian: Šatrininkų seniūnija) is an eldership in Lithuania, located in Vilnius District Municipality, east of Vilnius.

== Geography ==
- Rivers: Vilnia, Kyvė, Murlė, Šatrininkai;
- Reservoirs: Kyviškės reservoir, Grigaičiai reservoir;

== Ethnic composition ==
According to 2021 National Census data, the ethnic composition was as follows:

- Poles – 60.2% (1734)
- Lithuanians – 22.5% (647)
- Russians – 8% (231)
- Belarusians – 5.4% (157)
- Number of inhabitants: 2881

According to 2011 National Census data, the ethnic composition was as follows:

- Poles – 63.8%
- Lithuanians – 17.3%
- Russians – 9.6%
- Belarusians – 6.8%
- Number of inhabitants: 3213

== Military camp ==
On 24 August 2022 construction works started for a new military base in Rokantiškės with the main purpose of serving as a NATO basecamp in protecting the city of Vilnius. The project consists of an army base with permanent living spaces for soldiers, medical buildings, leisure and sports complexes, and military training rooms and garages for military vehicles. Camp will serve as headquarters for Duke Vaidotas Mechanised Infantry Brigade.

On 5 February 2024 the military camp officially was opened by Defence Minister Arvydas Anušauskas and Prime Minister Ingrida Šimonytė.
