= 10th Panzer Division (Bundeswehr) =

Coordinates: 48°05′28.46″N 9°14′55.04″E

- 10. Panzerdivision
- 10th Panzer Division Shoulder Insignia
- Active: 1 April 1959–present
- Country: Germany; Netherlands
- Type: Panzer
- Size: 20,000 soldiers
- Part of: German Army
- Garrison/HQ: Veitshöchheim
- Nicknames: Lion's division Löwendivision; The Tenth; Die Zehnte
- Mottos: Reliable, mobile, quick! Zuverlässig – beweglich – schnell!
- March: Fridericus-Rex-Grenadiermarsch
- Anniversaries: 1 April 1959
- Engagements: War in Bosnia; Civil war in Albania; Kosovo War; War in Afghanistan

Commanders
- Current commander: Major General Ruprecht Horst von Butler
- Notable commanders: Lieutenant General Leo Hepp General Johann Adolf Graf von Kielmansegg; General Günter Kießling; Lieutenant General Josef Moll Major General Erhard Bühler

The 10th Panzer Division (German: 10. Panzerdivision) is an armoured division of the German Army, part of the Bundeswehr. Its staff is based at Veitshöchheim. The division is a unit of the German Army's stabilization forces and specializes in conflicts of low intensity.

== History ==
This division was founded as the 10. Panzerdivision of the new German Army in 1959. The 10th Panzer Division is a part of Germany's permanent contribution to Eurocorps, the other being the German contribution to the Franco-German Brigade which was subordinate to the division until 2006.

After 1993 troops of this division participated in numerous overseas deployments. Among them were the first out-of-area land deployment operations for the Bundeswehr (in fact of any German military unit after World War II). Troops were deployed to Somalia (UNOSOM II) from 1993 to 1994 and to Bosnia and Herzegovina (IFOR) from 1995 to 1996 and stayed in this country until 1998 (SFOR). Soldiers of the 10th Panzer Division's SFOR contingent were also involved in the Bundeswehr's first combat operation in 1997 (Operation Libelle). In 2000, the 10th Panzer Division deployed more than 8,000 personnel to the Balkans. Between 2002 and 2003, it deployed to various operations in the Balkans and in Afghanistan.

In 2017, the 4th Rapid Deployment Brigade of the Czech Land Forces started to ″work closely″ with the division.

Since April 2024, the 10th Panzer Division provides the manoeuvre contingent for the Kosovo Force. The Franco-German Brigade provides the 200 soldiers from the division.

In April 2025, the 10th Panzer Division assumed command of the newly established 45th Panzer Brigade “Litauen” stationed permanently in Lithuania. The brigade is structured as a heavy mechanized formation and includes Panzerbataillon 203 and Panzergrenadierbataillon 122, both scheduled to deploy from Germany by 2026. It also integrates NATO’s Enhanced Forward Presence battlegroup in Lithuania. This marks the division’s first operational command of a permanently stationed force outside Germany.

== Organization ==
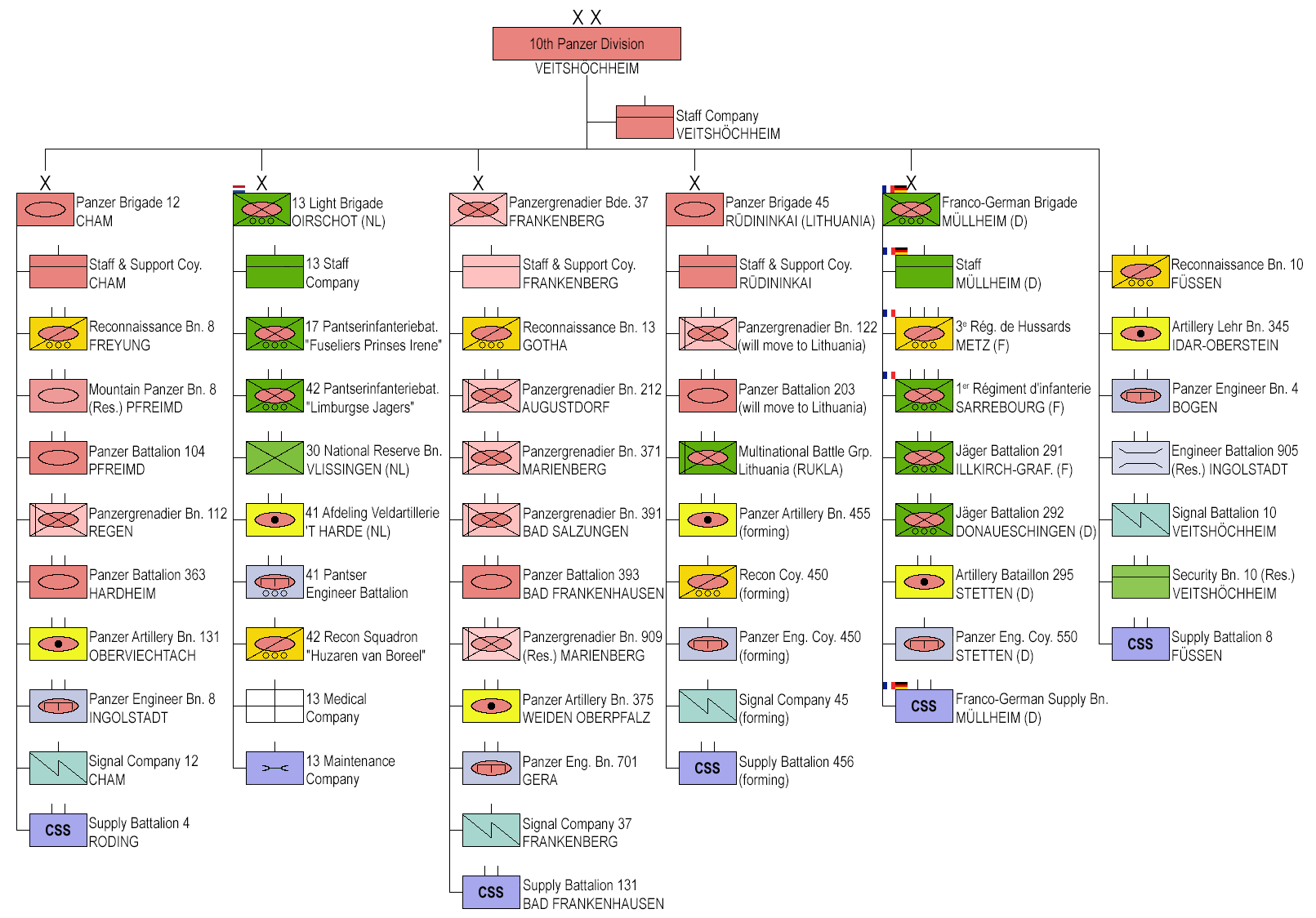
10th Panzer Division with integrated Dutch units 2025

- 10th Panzer Division (10. Panzerdivision), in Veitshöchheim
  - Panzer Brigade 12 (Panzerbrigade 12), in Cham
  - 13 Light Brigade (13 Lichte Brigade), in Oirschot (Netherlands)
  - Panzergrenadier Brigade 37 (Panzergrenadierbrigade 37), in Frankenberg
  - Panzer Brigade 45 (Panzerbrigade 45), in Rūdninkai (Lithuania) — activated on 1 April 2025 and initially consist of the Panzergrenadier Battalion 122 and Panzer Battalion 203.
  - Franco-German Brigade (Deutsch-Französische Brigade), in Müllheim (administrative control of the brigade's German units)
  - Reconnaissance Battalion 10 (Aufklärungsbataillon 10), in Füssen with Fennek reconnaissance vehicles and KZO drones
  - Artillery Lehr Battalion 345 (Artillerielehrbataillon 345), in Idar-Oberstein with 24x PzH 2000 155 mm self-propelled howitzers, 8x M270 MLRS multiple rocket launch systems, 12x 120 mm mortars, KZO drones and 2x Euro-Art COBRA counter-battery radars
  - Panzer Engineer Battalion 4 (Panzerpionierbataillon 4), in Bogen
  - Engineer Battalion 905 (Pionierbataillon 905), in Ingolstadt (Reserve unit)
  - Signal Battalion 10 (Fernmeldebataillon 10), in Veitshöchheim
  - Security Support Battalion 10 (Sicherungsbataillon 10), in Veitshöchheim (Reserve unit)
  - Supply Battalion 8 (Versorgungsbataillon 8), in Füssen

== Geographic Distribution ==
10th Panzer Division locations 2025:
Units: Panzer Panzergrenadier Jäger
Reconnaissance Artillery Engineers Logistics Signals
Reserve formations are in Italics
The 13 Light Brigade based in Oirschot in the Netherlands and the Panzer Brigade 45 based in Rūdninkai in Lithuania are off map.

== See also ==
- German Army
- Eurocorps
