= 45th Panzer Brigade =

- Panzerbrigade 45
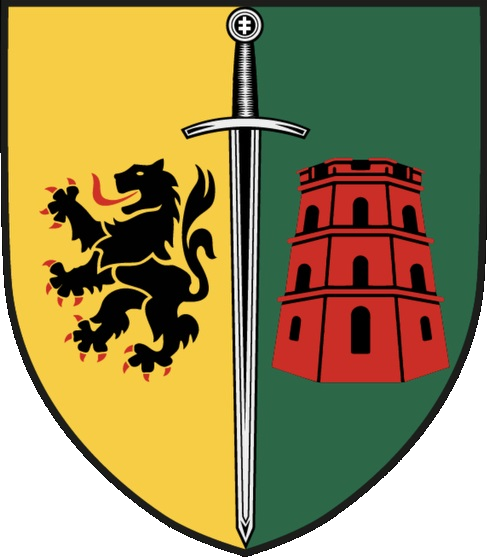
- Coat of Arms
- Active: 1 April 2025 – Present
- Country: Germany
- Branch: German Army
- Type: Heavy mechanized brigade
- Size: ~4,800 troops and 200 civilian staff (planned)
- Part of: 10th Panzer Division
- Locations: Rūdninkai Training Area; Rukla (both in Lithuania)
- Nickname: Litauenbrigade (Lithuania Brigade)

Commanders
- Current commander: Brigadegeneral Christoph Huber

Insignia
NATO Map Symbol
45
10

The 45th Panzer Brigade (German: Panzerbrigade 45, abbreviated PzBrig 45), also known as Lithuania Brigade (German: Litauenbrigade) in German public discourse, is a brigade of the German Armed Forces (Bundeswehr). Once its formation is complete, the brigade will consist of 4,800 troops and 200 civilian staff members. The brigade is subordinated to the 10th Panzer Division, whose headquarter is in Veitshöchheim in Germany. The unit is classified as a heavy mechanized brigade and will be equipped with main battle tanks and infantry fighting vehicles.

The brigade was activated on 1 April 2025 in Lithuania. Notably, it is the first German brigade-sized unit to be based abroad permanently since World War II.

== History ==
The primary purpose of the armoured brigade is to deter Russia from violating the territorial integrity and sovereignty of the Baltic States (Estonia, Latvia, and Lithuania), all of whom are NATO member states. Lithuania is vulnerable both because of its land border with Russia's ally Belarus and the Russian exclave of Kaliningrad Oblast. Only a tight land corridor in between, called the Suwałki Gap, connects the Baltic states to the rest of NATO territory, making Lithuania particularly exposed in case of a Russian attack.

In the aftermath of the Russian annexation of Crimea in 2014, NATO established the Enhanced Forward Presence and deployed the multinational battlegroups to the Baltic states in 2017. The battlegroup in Lithuania consisted of roughly 1600 soldiers from various NATO member states on a rotational basis. Germany has been the lead nation, contributing about 1000 troops. After the Russian invasion of Ukraine in 2022, Germany had pledged to keep one combat brigade at higher combat readiness, ready to deploy to Lithuania within 10 days. Lithuania repeatedly requested a robust, permanent German deployment, which the German government initially declined to commit to. However, in June 2023, German Minister of Defense Boris Pistorius announced that Germany would form a new combat brigade and permanently deploy it to Lithuania.

In December 2023, Lithuanian Minister of Defense Arvydas Anušauskas and his German counterpart Boris Pistorius signed a formal agreement on the planned deployment. In April 2024, an advance team of 20 officials arrived in the Lithuanian capital to organize preparatory work. The brigade was formally established on 1 April 2025, being planned to reach full operational capability in 2027.

45th Panzer Brigade was inaugurated on 22 May 2025 with a military parade on the Cathedral Square in Vilnius. German chancellor Friedrich Merz and Lithuanian president Gitanas Nausėda attended the inauguration along with the defense ministers of both countries, Boris Pistorius and Dovilė Šakalienė.

== Deployment ==
The brigade is expected to comprise 4800 soldiers and 200 civilian staff. Further, a third of the German soldiers are expected to bring their families to Lithuania, requiring not only military infrastructure, but also civilian facilities such as German-language kindergartens and schools.

The bulk of the brigade will be stationed in Rūdninkai Training Area, a densely forested military facility. It currently sees major construction to prepare for the arrival of the German brigade. Lithuanian officials estimate the Rūdninkai base alone to cost over €1 billion (roughly $1.1 billion). Facilities will include accommodation as well as dedicated storage, maintenance, and firing ranges for main battle tanks.

There were reports on financial disagreements about the cost splitting between the Lithuanian and German governments. Whereas the German side expected Lithuania to provide all infrastructure associated with accommodating the German soldiers, Lithuania appeared unwilling to pay for the establishment of schools and kindergartens, or for parts of the accommodation, citing higher expected standards and hence costs compared to common conditions locally.

The deployment is also expected to put a significant strain on the German defense budget. Its officials estimate the cost to their taxpayers to range between €6 billion to €9 billion, with annual operating costs of the base being €800 million. One-time expenses include equipment acquisitions for the new brigade, such as main battle tanks of the type Leopard 2A8.

In May 2025, around 400 troops were deployed to Lithuania as part of the brigade, a number that rose to 500 by the end of 2025, with the initial focus on command structure development, in-theatre training, and force integration. In February 2026, the existing NATO Enhanced Forward Presence (eFP) battlegroup (led by Germany) was integrated into the brigade, thus raising the brigade's headcount to around 1,800 troops, with the aim of reaching 2,000 German personnel by mid-2026.

== Organization ==
The brigade is planned to be organized as follows:

- Panzer Brigade 45 (Panzerbrigade 45), in Rūdninkai and Rukla (Lithuania)
  - Staff and Support Company Panzer Brigade 45 (Stabs- und Unterstützungskompanie Panzerbrigade 45), in Nemenčinė
  - Panzergrenadier Battalion 122 (Panzergrenadierbataillon 122), in Oberviechtach with 44x Puma Infantry fighting vehicles — will move to Lithuania in 2026
  - Panzer Battalion 203 (Panzerbataillon 203), in Augustdorf with 44x Leopard 2A7 main battle tanks — will move to Lithuania in 2026
  - Multinational Battle Group Lithuania, in Rukla
  - Panzer Artillery Battalion 455 (Panzerartilleriebataillon 455; formed 19 November 2026, will move to Lithuania before the second half of 2027)
  - Supply Battalion 456 (Versorgungsbataillon 456; formed 19 November 2026, will move to Lithuania before the second half of 2027)
  - Reconnaissance Company 450 (Aufklärungskompanie 450; formed 19 November 2026, will move to Lithuania before the second half of 2027)
  - Panzer Engineer Company 450 (Panzerpionierkompanie 450; formed 19 November 2026, will move to Lithuania before the second half of 2027)
  - Signal Company Panzer Brigade 45 (Fernmeldekompanie Panzerbrigade 45), in Rokantiškės

=== Commanders ===
The following officers have commanded the brigade or its advance team:

No.	Name	Start of appointment	End of appointment
2	Brigadier General Christoph Huber (commander activation staff)	23 September 2024
1	Colonel André Hastenrath (commander activation staff)	8 April 2024	23 September 2024

== See also ==
- Tank Battalions of the German Army 1956–2008
