= Rokantiškės, Šatrininkai =

Rokantiškės
- Village
- Location of Rokantiškės
- Coordinates: 54°39′50.4″N 25°23′24″E
- Country: Lithuania
- County: Vilnius County
- Municipality: Vilnius District Municipality
- Eldership: Šatrininkai Eldership

Population (2021)
  - Total: 25
- Time zone: UTC+2 (EET)
  - Summer (DST): UTC+3 (EEST)

Rokantiškės is a village in the Vilnius District Municipality, 1 kilometre (0.62 miles) from Grigaičiai. National road KK101 passes through the village territory.

== History ==
Historical western part of the village was detached and integrated into Vilnius city to form Rokantiškės district of Vilnius.

== Military camp ==
On 24 August 2022 constructions works started for new military base in Rokantiškės. Project consists of army base with permanent living spaces for soldiers, medical buildings, leisure and sports complexes, military training rooms, garages for military vehicles. This will serve as headquarters for Duke Vaidotas Mechanised Infantry Brigade.

On 5 February 2024 the military camp officially was opened by Defence Minister Arvydas Anušauskas and Prime Minister Ingrida Šimonytė.

== Demography ==
Historical population

Year	Pop.	±% p.a.
1931	142	—
1959	273	+2.36%
1970	310	+1.16%
1979	313	+0.11%

Year	Pop.	±% p.a.
1989	219	−3.51%
2001	15	−20.02%
2011	13	−1.42%
2021	25	+6.76%

Source: 1902, 1923, 1959 & 1970, 1979, 1989, 2001, 20112021
