= Pabradė Training Area =

Military facility in Lithuania

Coordinates: 55.02206°N 25.78961°E

Pabradė Training Area (Lithuanian: Pabradės poligonas) is a major military facility of the Lithuanian Armed Forces located near Pabradė, Lithuania. It was established in 1904. It has an area of 17,514 ha (43,280 acres) and can be used for training at a battalion level. Since 2014, the official name of the facility is General Silvestras Žukauskas Training Area, but colloquially it remains known as Pabradė Training Area.

Within the Pabradė Training Area is the US military camp Camp Herkus where US forces were deployed on 30 August 2021, its main purpose is to house US Army Soldiers in Lithuania. As of now, Camp Herkus is a temporary base for US soldiers to reside in while military officials consider a more permanent base close to Belarus and Kaliningrad. Camp Herkus contains ~500 members of the 1st Infantry Division along with several dozen M1 Abrams tanks, Bradley Fighting Vehicles, and other support equipment. Camp Herkus exists to train US troops in Lithuania following Belarusian military exercises near the border with Lithuania.

In March 2025, four United States soldiers and one M88A2 Hercules were reported missing during an exercise. After several days of complex search and recovery operation, the armoured vehicle weighing over 60 tonnes and four deceased soldiers were pulled out of a deep swamp on 1 April 2025.

== Gallery ==
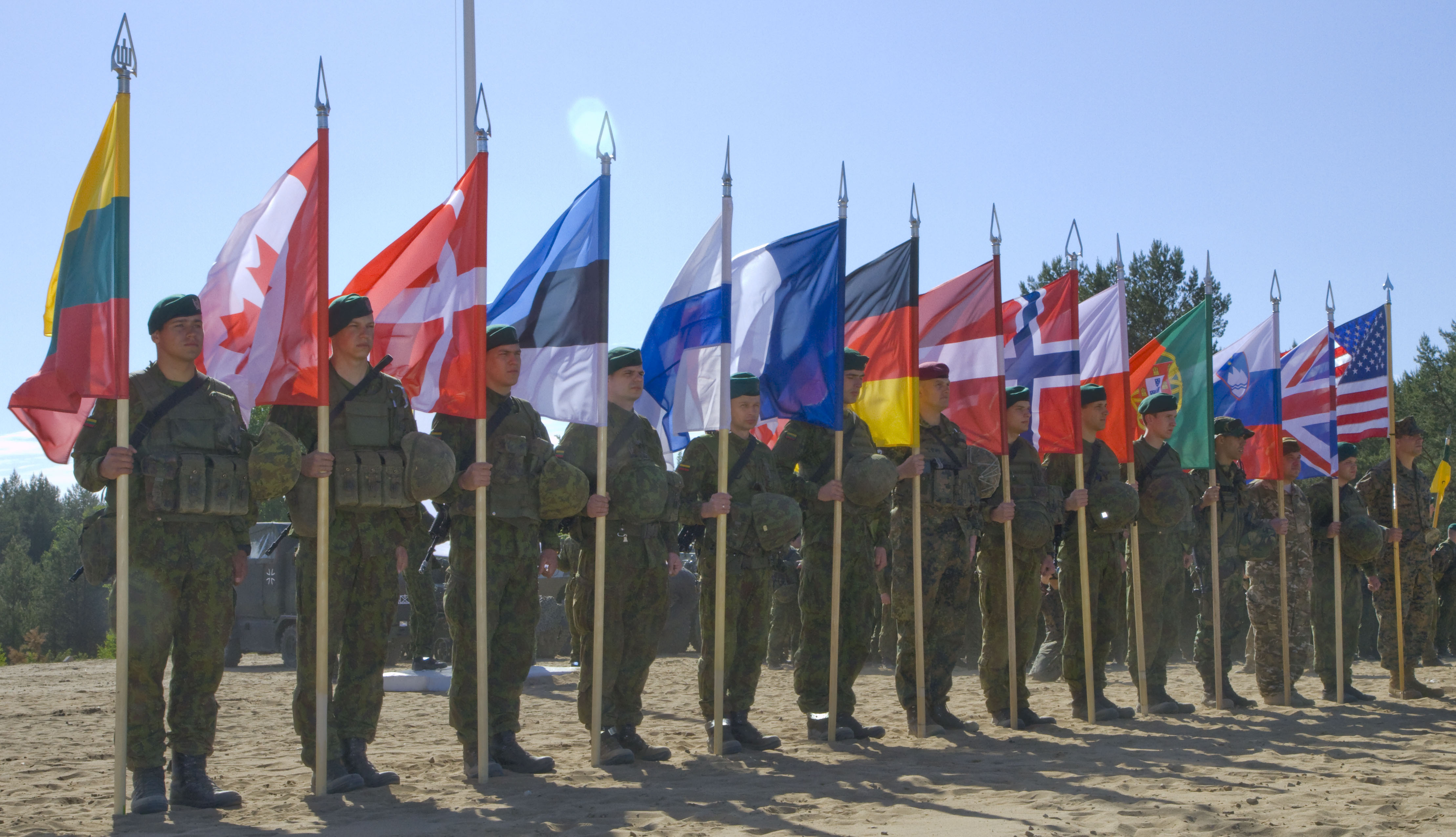

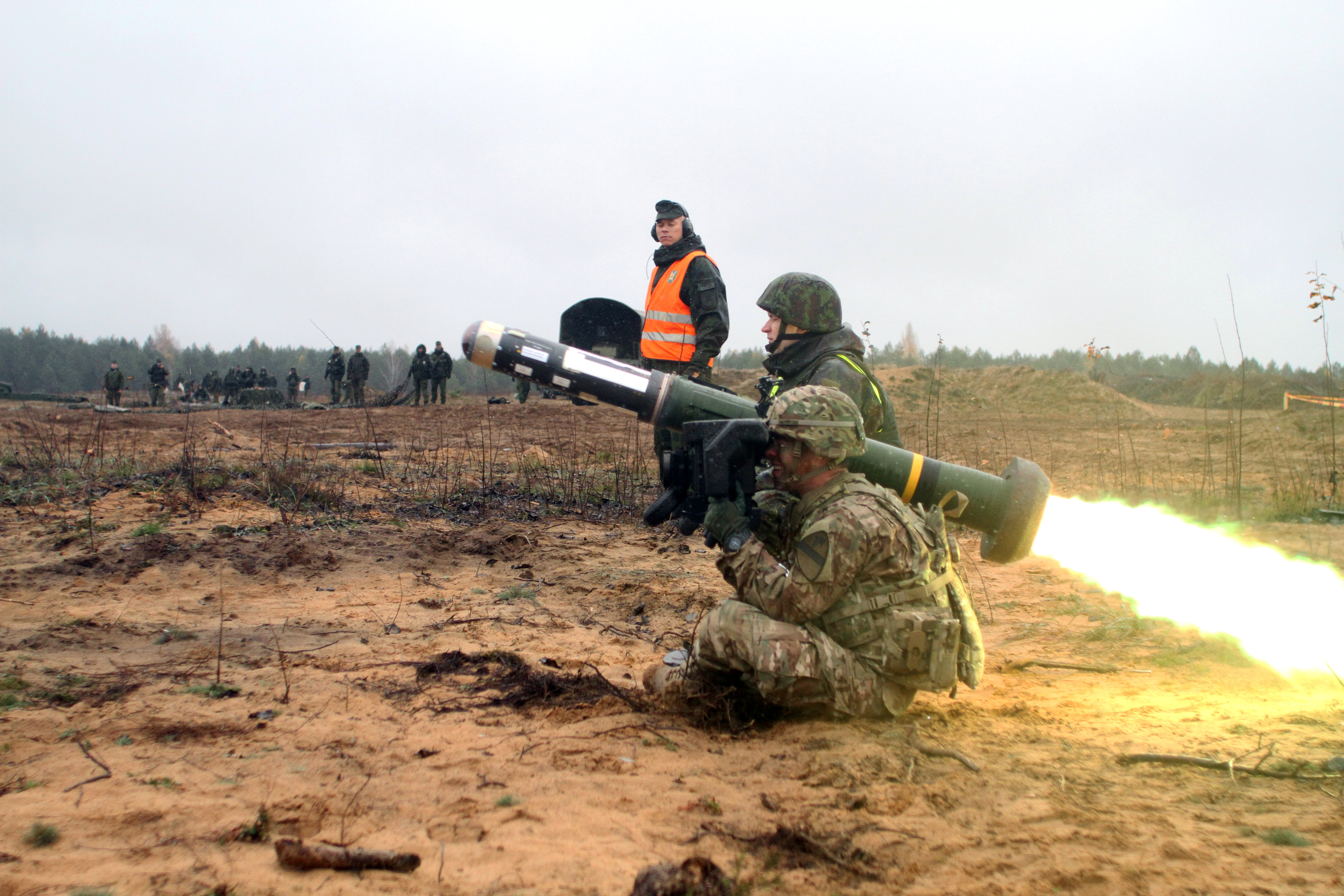

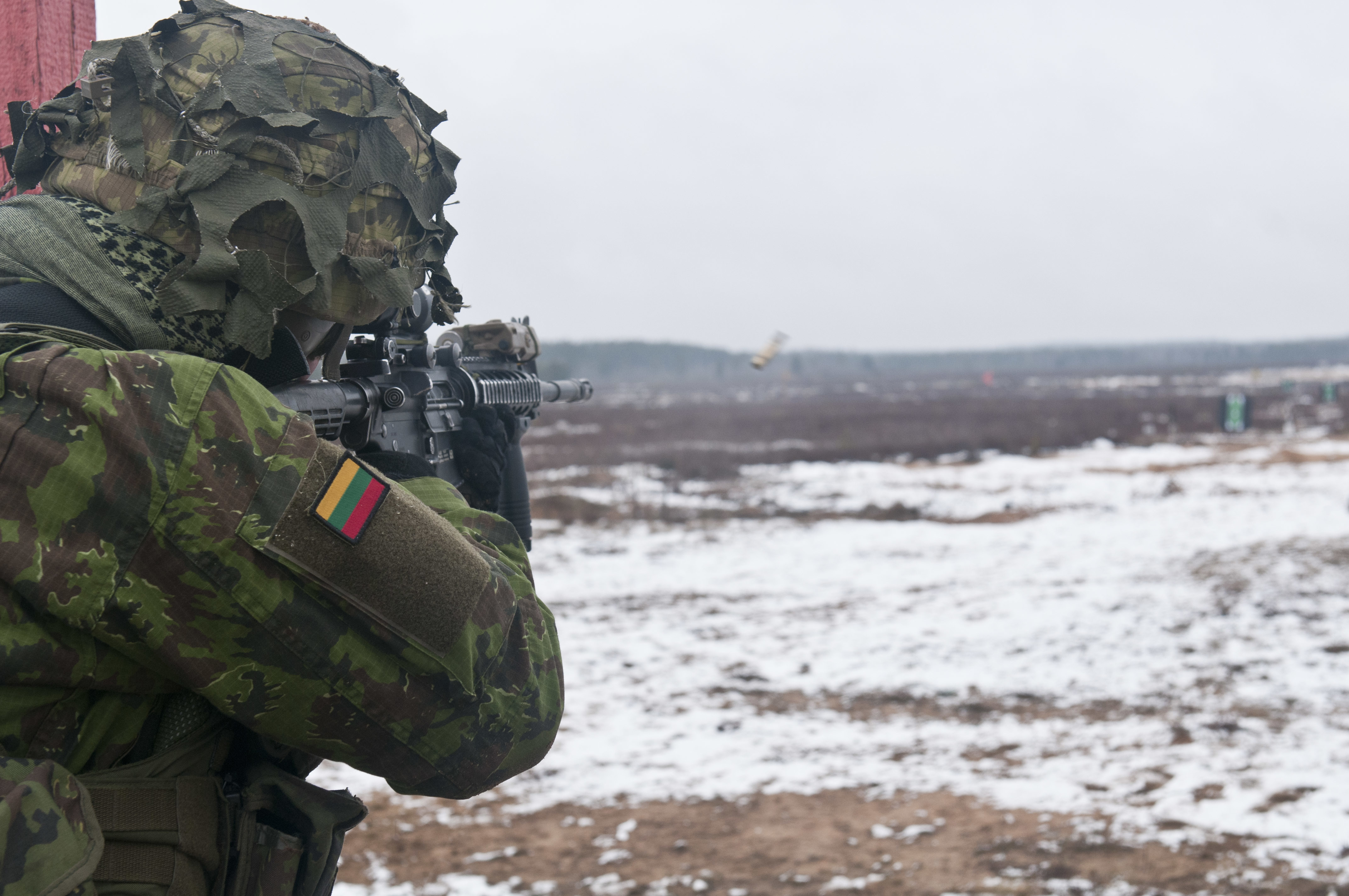

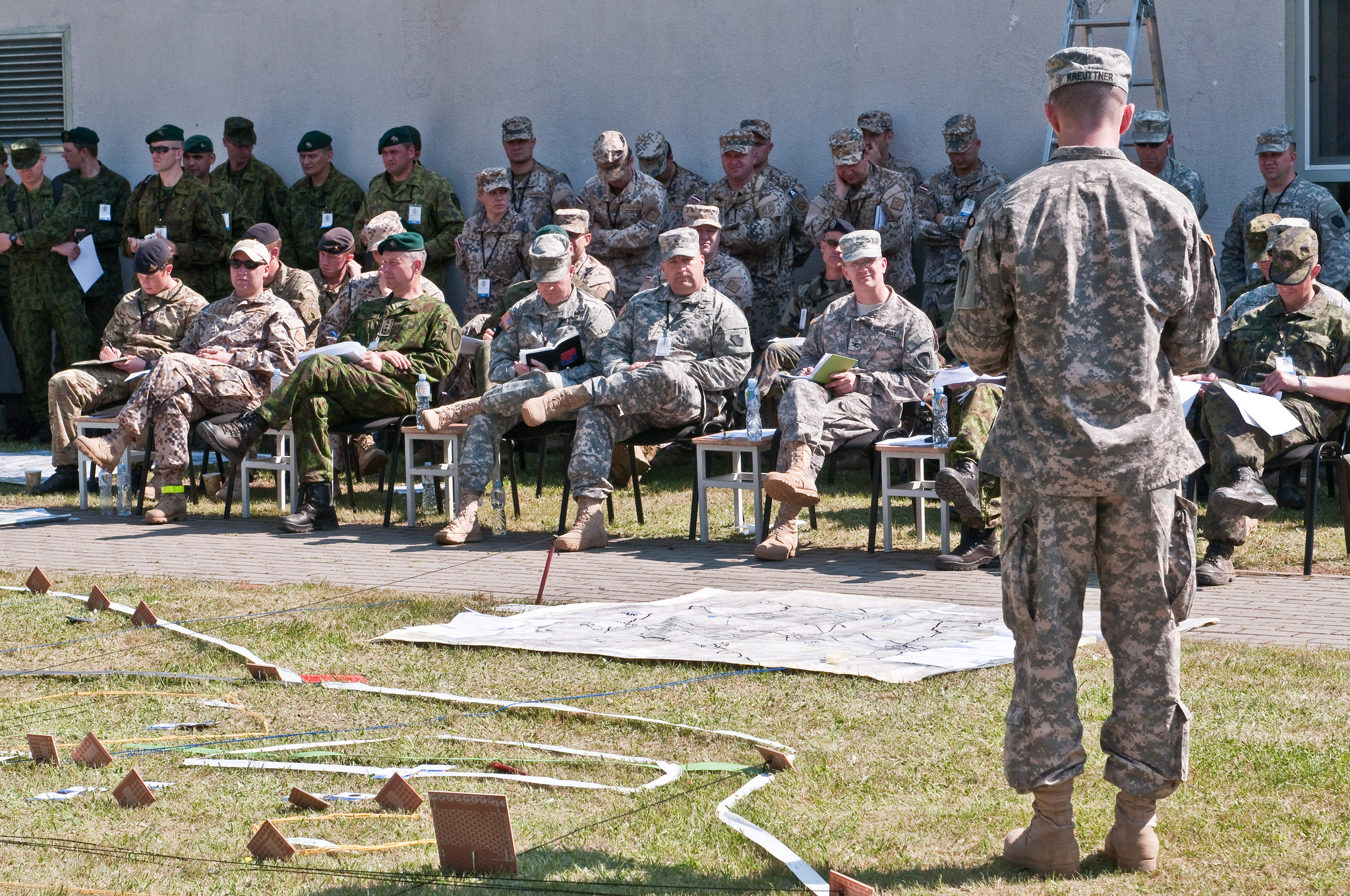

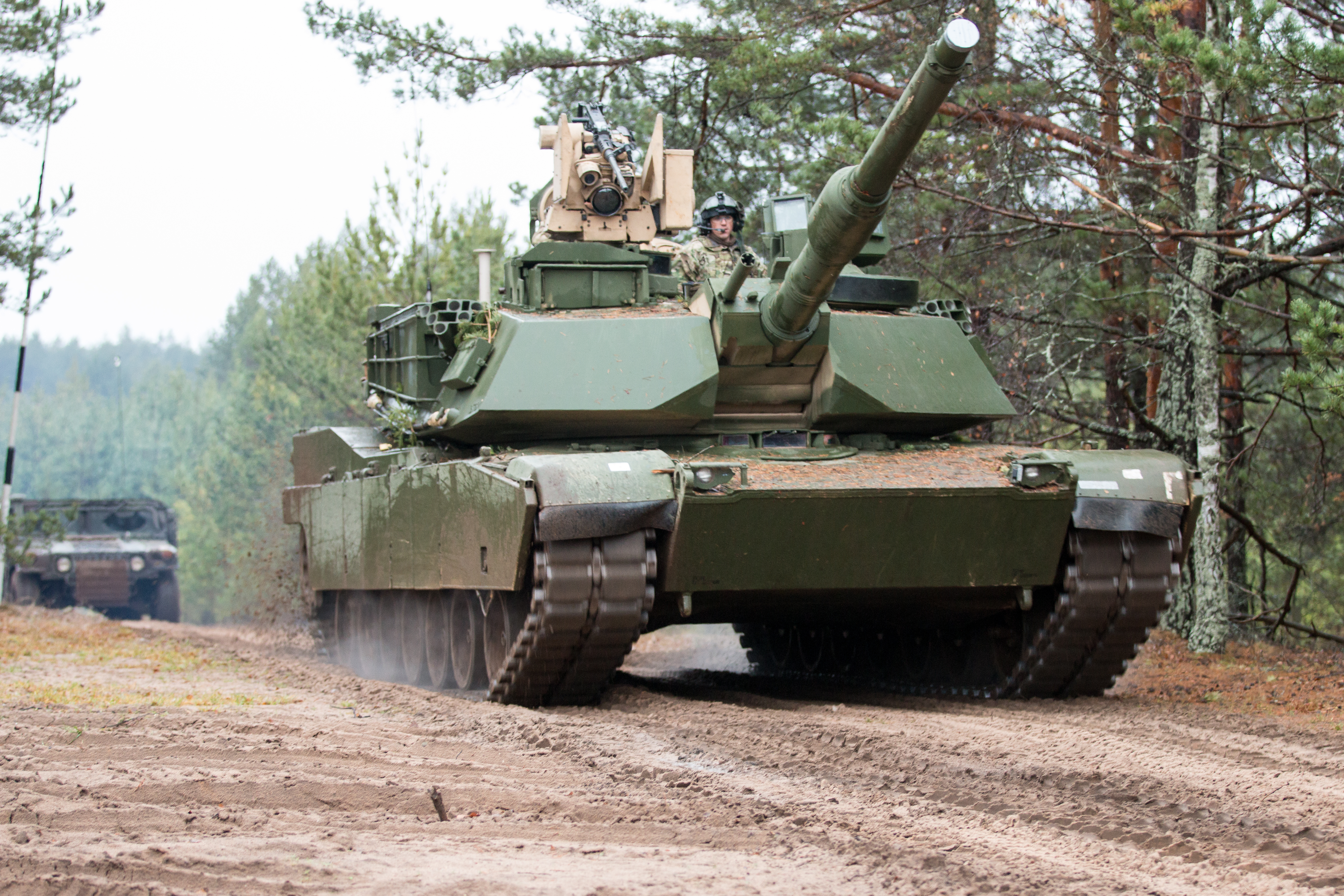

== See also ==
- Rūdninkai Training Area
- Gaižiūnai
- Rukla
