= Rūdninkai Training Area =

Military facility in Lithuania

Coordinates: 54°23′18″N 025°5′42″E

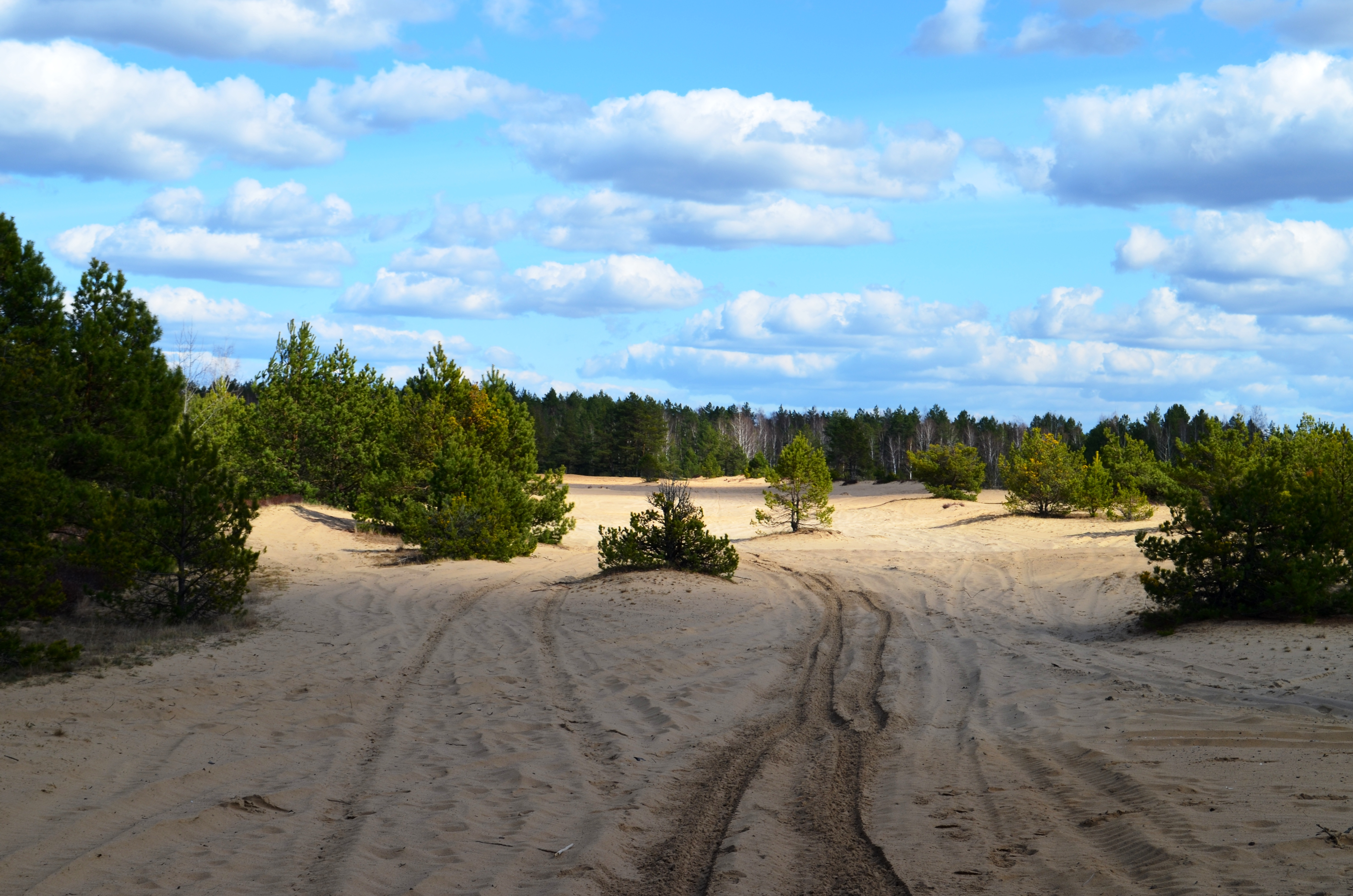
Terrain in Rūdninkai Training Area

Rūdninkai Training Area (Lithuanian: Rūdninkų karinis poligonas) is a military facility in Lithuania, located 36 km (22 mi) southwest of Vilnius and 16 km (10 mi) from the border with Belarus. It is surrounded by Rūdninkai Forest, the fifth largest forest in Lithuania. It is part of a larger training complex encompassing about 100 km^{2} (40 mi^{2}).

== History ==
Established in 1948, during the Soviet occupation, the area was used for training bomber crews. The facility was closed in 1993. Unexploded ordnance (UXO), usually air-dropped bombs weighing 50–100 kg (110–220 lb), are still discovered in the facility. The largest bomb, detonated in 2007, weighed 3,000 kg (6,600 lb). In 2008, Rūdninkai training area was the largest territory of 222 areas in Lithuania, covering a total of 250 km^{2} (97 mi^{2}), that were still contaminated by unexploded ordnance.

The training area was re-established in 2022. From 2025, the Lithuanian Armed Forces will begin hosting the German 45th Panzer Brigade (Bundeswehr) in Rūdninkai Training Area. In June 2025, the European Investment Bank approved €540 million loan for the construction of a new military base in Rūdninkai.

== See also ==
- Pabradė Training Area
- Gaižiūnai
- Rukla
