= Wachregiment =

In German military tradition, a Wachregiment ("guard regiment") is a regiment that also performs guard of honor duties. It is not to be confused with a Guards unit in Soviet military tradition.

Wachregimente include:

- Wachregiment Berlin (Weimar Republic)
- Wachregiment "Feliks E. Dzierzynski" (East Germany)
- Wachregiment "Friedrich Engels" (WR-1) (East Germany)
- Wachregiment "Hugo Eberlein" (WR-2) (East Germany)

== See also ==
- Wachbataillon - the West German and later unified Germany equivalent.
