= Großer Wachaufzug =

Military ceremony in Berlin, Germany

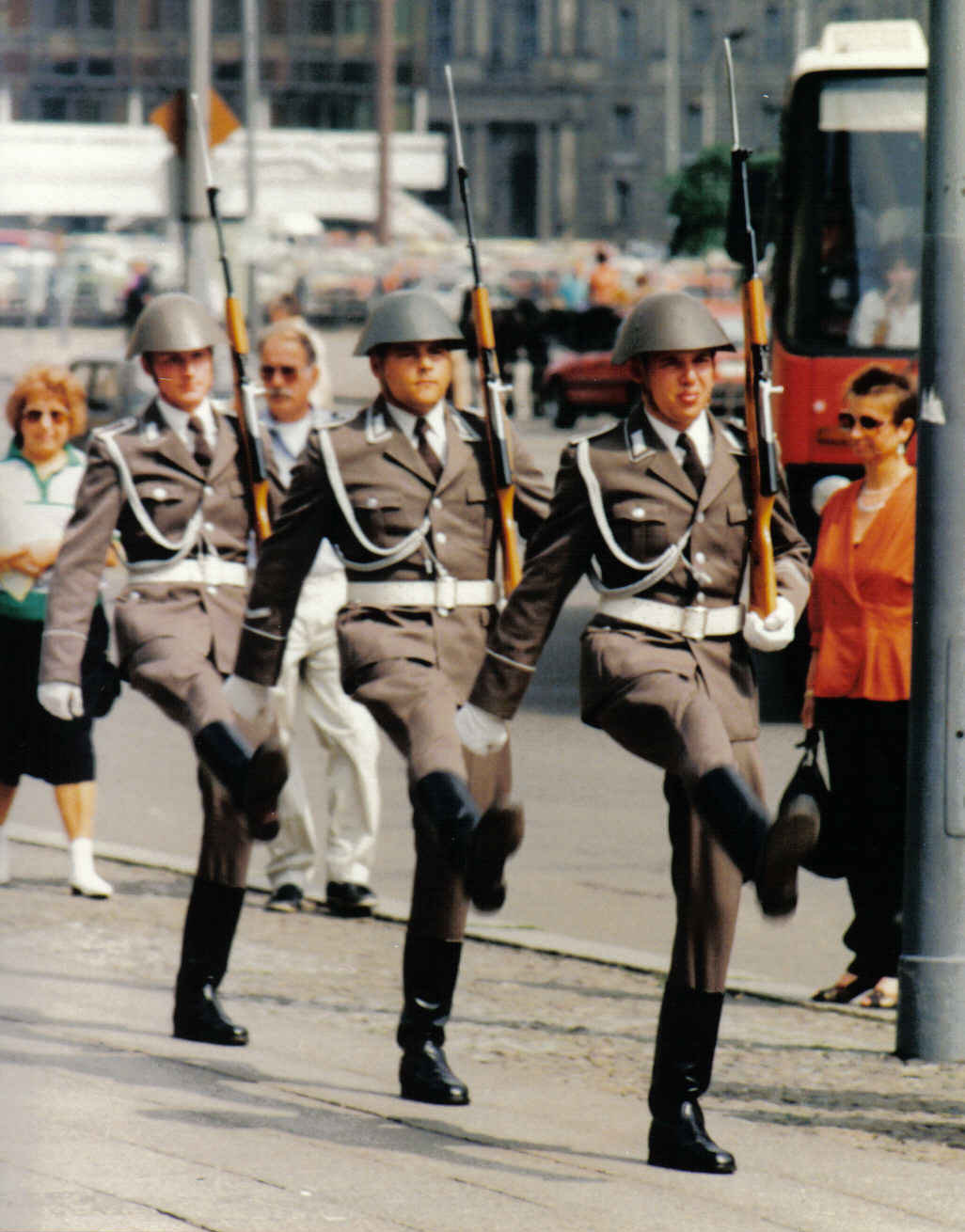
The changing of the guard in 1990.

The Großer Wachaufzug ("Grand Guard Mounting") was a military ceremony and guard mounting in Berlin, the capital Germany, held on certain occasions at the Neue Wache. The building has been the center of guard duties performed since 1931.

== History ==
=== Before 1945 ===
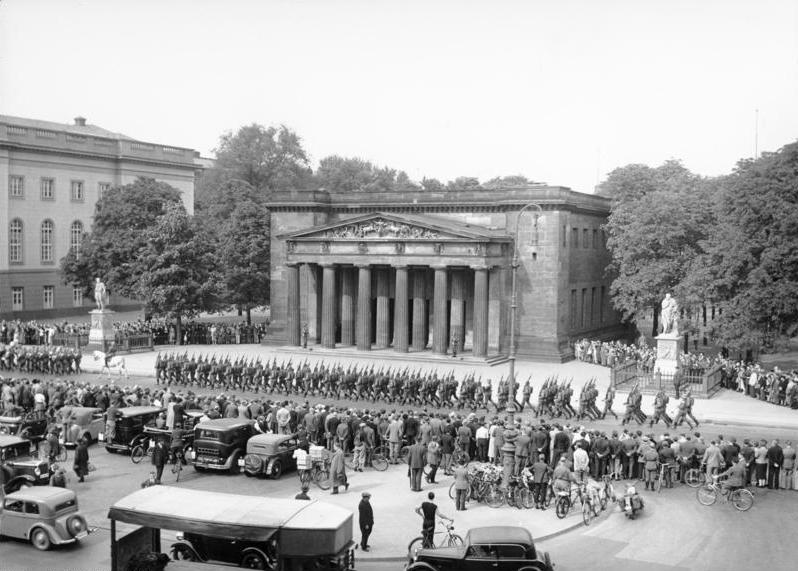
The ceremony in 1938.

It was introduced on 18 September 1818 on occasion of the state visit of Tsar Alexander I of Russia, with the Prussian 1st Guards Grenadiers mounting the first guard. It took place for 100 years until the end of the Prussian monarchy in November 1918. The event ended with a concert by the respective regimental military band in the Kastanienwäldchen. The Weimar Republic had initially abolished ceremony until the Reichswehr formed the Berlin Guard in 1921. It was not until 1925 that Reich President Paul von Hindenburg reintroduce the ceremony, being a ceremony held twice a week. It consisted of a band leading a guard through the Brandenburg Gate, across Pariser Platz into Unter den Linden. On May 31, the anniversary of the Battle of Jutland, the Reichsmarine (German navy) served as guards. On 12 March 1933, the German government under the Nazi Party reintroduced the "Wachaufzug unter den Linden", after a two-year hiatus. It was mounted by the Infantry Regiment Großdeutschland, and later by the Luftwaffe Guard Battalion under the command of a lieutenant on horseback. Up until the Battle of Berlin in the last weeks of the Second World War, the ceremony was moved across the linden trees in front of the Neue Wache.

=== 1945-1990 ===
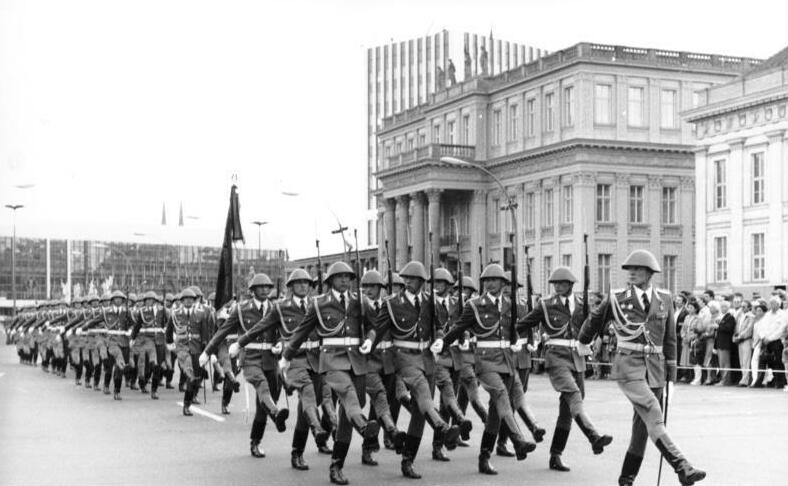
The ceremony during the 40th anniversary VE Day celebrations in 1985.

During the division of Germany in the Cold War, the National People's Army of East Germany resumed the ritual on International Workers' Day in 1962, the memorial at this point being dedicated to the victims of fascism and militarism. Two soldiers from the Friedrich Engels Guard Regiment served as permanent honor guards, with a ceremony being held every Wednesday and Saturday, causing it to become a major tourist attraction. It was broadcast directly from the Berliner Rundfunk. The ceremony route in communist Germany, saw the honor guards depart from Friedrich Engels Barracks on Kupfergraben, with the regimental band and corps of drums leading the formation. This military ritual, originally that of old Prussia, developed into an attraction for Berlin tourists in the GDR.

=== Since unification ===
The last ceremony was held on 26 September 1990, a few days before German reunification. The united Federal Republic of Germany did not continue the tradition of the Great Guard.

== See also ==
- Großer Zapfenstreich
- Sunset Parade
- Ceremony of the Flags
