= Military Music Service of the National People's Army =

- Militärischer Musikdienst der Nationale Volksarmee
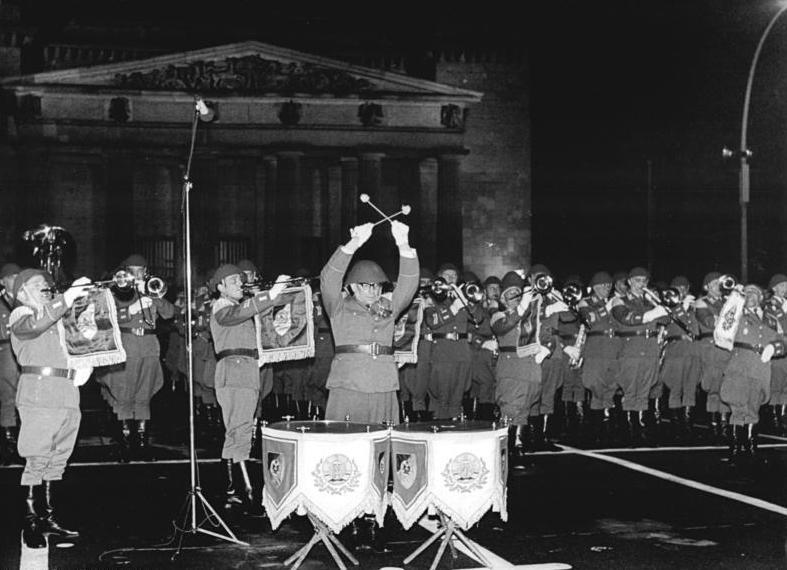
- The band at Großer Zapfenstreich
- Active: 1956; 70 years ago
- Disbanded: 2 November 1990; 35 years ago
- Country: East Germany
- Branch: National People's Army (NPA)
- Type: Military Band
- Headquarters: East Berlin

Commanders
- Final Generalmusikdirektor (General Music Director): Colonel Heinz Häcker

The Military Music Service of the National People's Army (Militärischer Musikdienst der Nationale Volksarmee in German) was made up of the Military Bands of the Nationale Volksarmee and the Corps of Drums of the Military Music Service.

== Constituent bands ==
=== Central Band of the NPA Land Forces ===
The Central Band of the NVA Land Forces (also known as the Central Band of the NPA, Zentralorchester der NVA) was no reorganization such as the Stabsmusikkorps of the Bundeswehr, but it was taken over in 1956 by the KVP and at this time could look back on a seven -year history as a symphony orchestra or symphonic wind band. Of all the active bands, it was the most senior band of the entire NPA.

The development of the Band ran until 1959 in normal tracks and without special features. Then Major Gerhard Baumann, former director of the Schwerin People's Police Band, came to Berlin via Leipzig and took over the leadership of the ZO from the hands of Major Hans-Helmut Hunger. In the "era Baumann", which lasted until 1983, the Central Band of the NVA became a term for solid military music and an extraordinary ensemble of sound. However, the uniqueness of the orchestra was not based solely on its position as the largest and most important music corps of military music of the NVA, because the official music - up to extraordinary representative performances - was, as with all top brass corps of a state, integrated into predetermined framework conditions, albeit Here, of course, his style and the treatment of the profession not only make the connoisseur sit up. In 1983, Colonel Gerhard Baumann handed over the baton to Heinz Häcker, who led the ZO until the time of reunification.

The fate of the ZO was ultimately no different than that of the NVA as a whole. As a full blown Bundeswehr band in its final months the central band was disbanded under its last director, Major Bernd Zivny, who performed the band's final Berlin concert on 2 November 1990, the only time it performed wearing Bundeswehr uniforms as part of the unification of the band services of the former two Germanies, it was rebadged briefly as the local band for the now reunified Berlin city garrison.

=== Band of the National People's Navy ===
The Band of the National People's Navy (Musikkorps der Volksmarine) was the only band supporting the ceremonial activities of the Volksmarine.

=== Central Band of the National People's Army Air Forces ===
The Central Band of the National People's Army Air Forces (Orchester der Luftstreitkräfte der Nationalen Volksarmee) supported the ceremonial activities of the Air Forces of the National People's Army, and reported thus to the Kommando LSK/LV in East Berlin.

=== Band of the Border Troops ===
The Band of the Border Troops of the German Democratic Republic (Orchester der Grenztruppen der DDR) was the official band supporting the ceremonial activities of the Border Troops of the German Democratic Republic, a directly reporting agency of the Ministry of National Defense. It was affiliated to the MMS-NPA owing to its status as a former service branch of the NVA itself from 1961 to 1973.

=== Regimental Band and Corps of Drums of the Friedrich Engels Guard Regiment ===
The Regimental Band and Corps of Drums of the Friedrich Engels Guard Regiment (Musikkorps und Spielmannszug der Wachregiment Friedrich Engels) also known in an official capacity as the Stabsmusikkorps Kommandantur Berlin (Staff Band of the Commandant of Berlin) was the official regimental band of the Friedrich Engels Guard Regiment, the official guard of honour regiment of the NVA, which served during ceremonial occasions like state visits, guard mountings at the Neue Wache, military parades, oath taking ceremonies of new conscripts, the Großer Zapfenstreich and wreath laying ceremonies. It also supported the activities of the Guard Regiment Hugo Eberlein, the non-public duties guard unit of the Ministry of National Defence.

=== Central Band of the Ministry of Internal Affairs ===
The Central Band of the Ministry of Internal Affairs (Zentrales Orchester des Ministeriums des Innern) supported the ceremonial activities of the Ministry of the Interior of the GDR.

=== Regimental Band and Corps of Drums of the Felix Dzerzhinsky Guards Regiment ===
The Band and Corps of Drums of the Felix Dzerzhinsky Guards Regiment (Musikkorps und Spielmannszug des Wachregiments "Feliks Dzierzynski") was the official regimental band of the Felix Dzerzhinsky Guards Regiment, the armed internal security regiment within the Ministry for State Security.

=== Erich-Weinert-Ensemble ===
The Erich-Weinert-Ensemble, named after communist writer Erich Weinert, was a professional army ensemble of in the NVA that was the equivalent to the Alexandrov Ensemble in the Soviet Union and the Representative Ensemble of the Bulgarian People's Army. Originally a unit of the Kasernierte Volkspolizei in 1950, it was transferred to the NVA 6 years later and was transferred to the Bundeswehr in 1989, defunct by 1994. It consisted of a male choir, a ballet, an orchestra, and a theatre troupe, all of which were based in Berlin-Biesdorf.

== Common repertoire ==
- Präsentiermarsch der Nationale Volksarmee (Inspection March)
- Parademarsch № 1 der Nationalen Volksarmee (Parade March)
- Präsentiermarsch des Wachregiment "Feliks Dzierzynski" (Inspection March)
- Präsentiermarsch der Volksmarine (Inspection March)
- Unsere Volksmarine
- Paradefanfare
- Parademarsch "7 Oktober"
- Marsch "Oktoberparade"

== Generalmusikdirektors ==
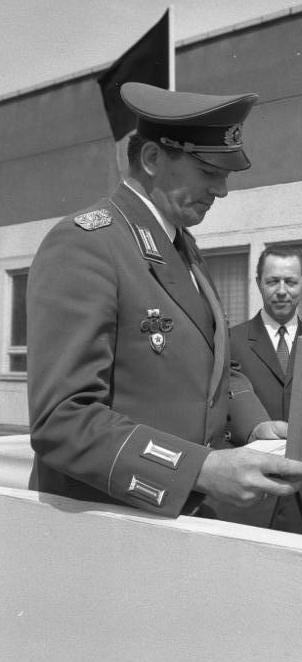
Gerhard Baumann in 1971.

The band has been led by 3 Generalmusikdirektors (General Music Directors) over its more than 30-year history.

- Major Hans-Helmut Hunger (1949 - 4 October 1973)
- Colonel Gerhard Baumann (4 October 1973 - 18 November 1983)
- Colonel Heinz Häcker (18 November 1983 - 2 November 1990)

=== Notable commanders ===
- Major Bernd Zivny (Central Band of the NPA Land Forces)
- Captain Ludwig Schmidt (Band of the National People's Navy)
- Helmut Sommer (Central Band of the Ministry of Internal Affairs)

== Gallery ==
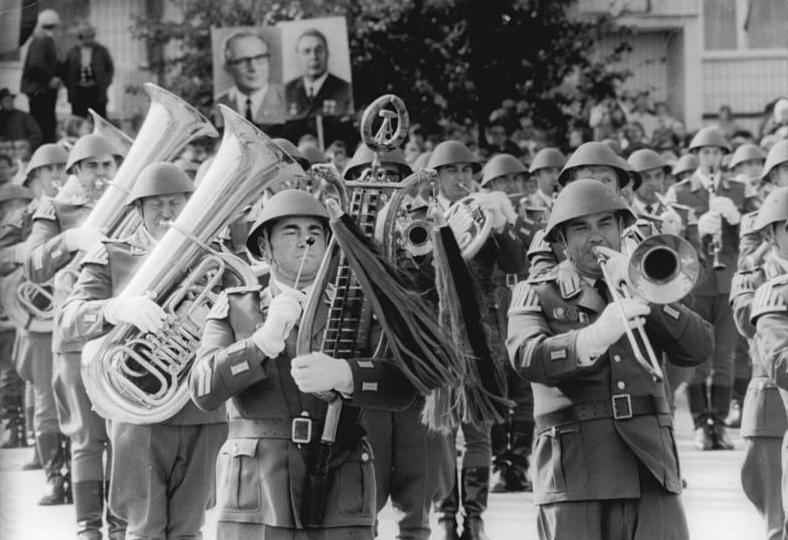

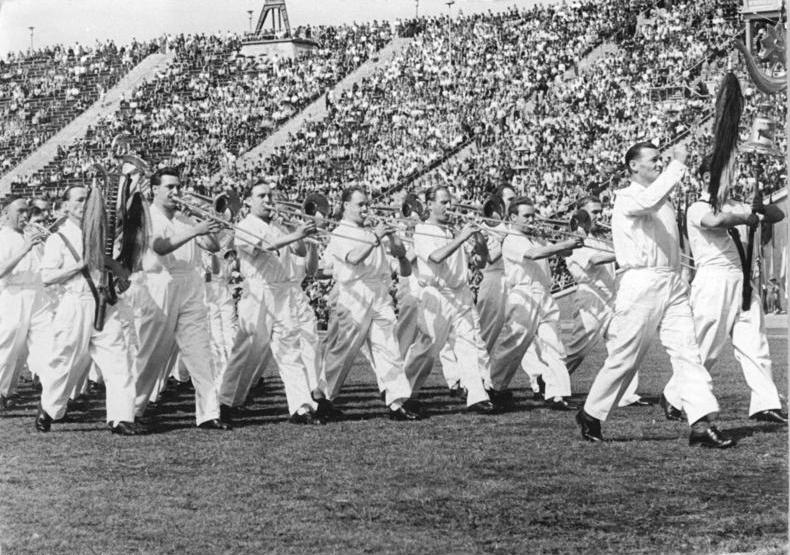
The band in sports uniforms.

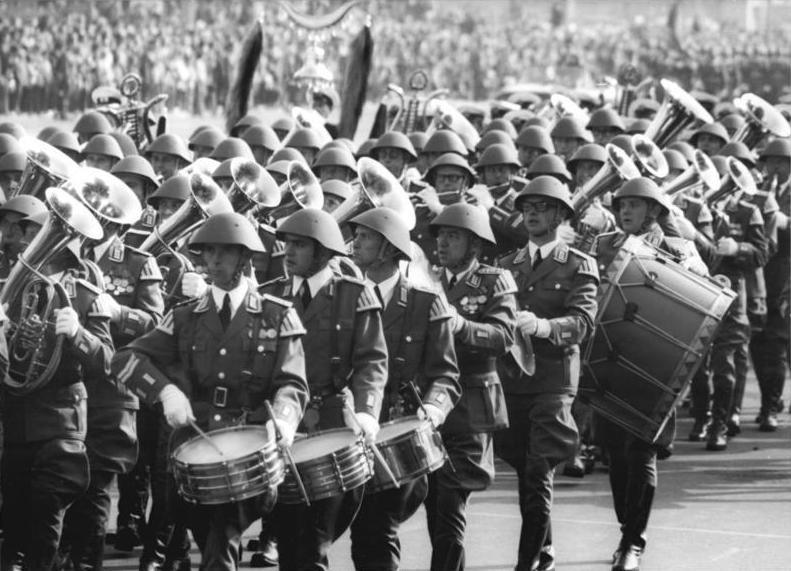

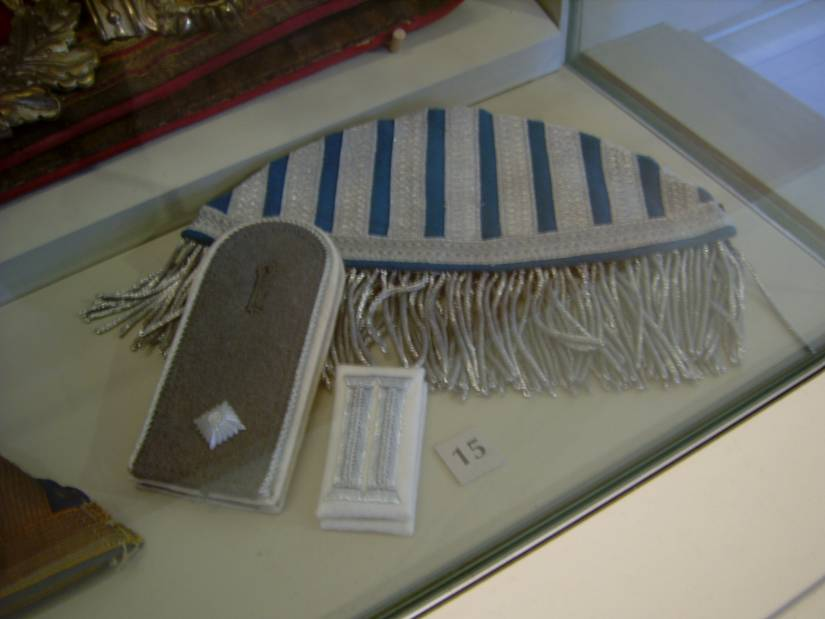
The Epaulette of the band.

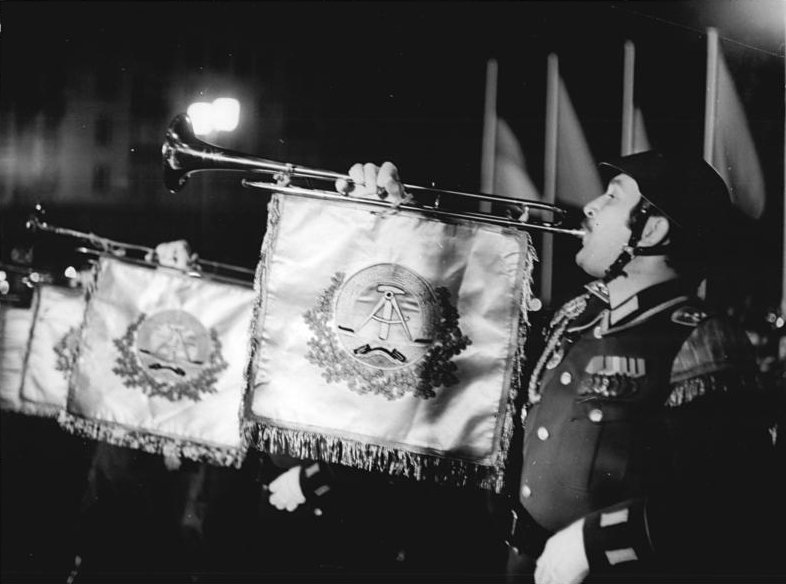
A fanfarist of the Regimental Band of the Friedrich Engels Guard Regiment.
