= Yorckscher Marsch =

German Military March

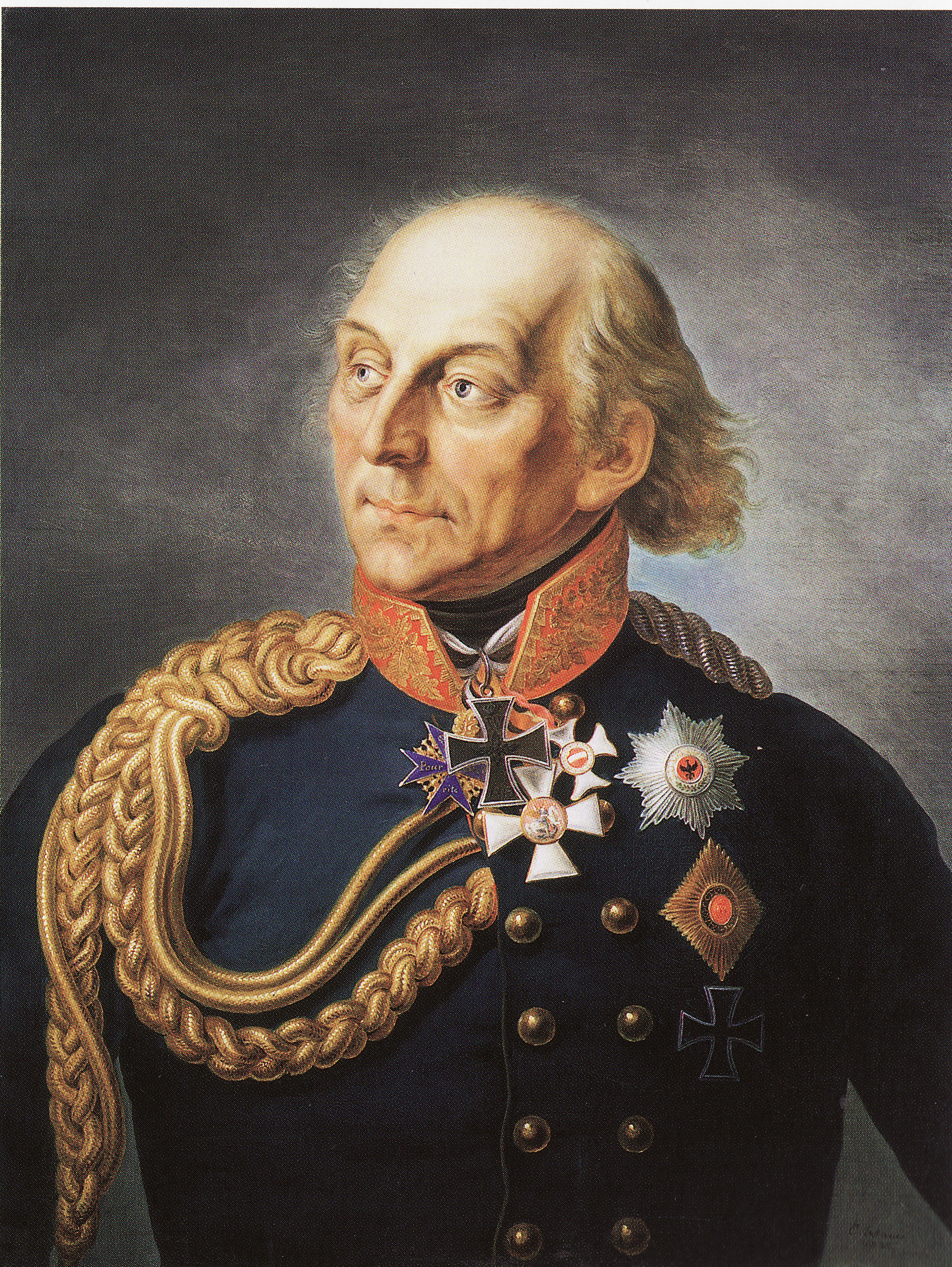
Ludwig Yorck von Wartenburg

"Yorckscher Marsch"
The "Yorckscher Marsch", performed by the United States Marine Band in 2007.

"Yorckscher Marsch" was written by Ludwig van Beethoven in 1808 or 1809 as a march for the Bohemian militia. It was the first of four military marches written by Beethoven.

== History ==
From the name of the Prussian General Yorck, Beethoven's march is also known as Marsch des Yorck'schen Korps (Armeemarschsammlung II, 103, Bundeswehr (Armeemarschsammlung II, 37, Königlich Preußisch) and Heeresmarsch II, 5), was composed in 1808 in F major as a "Marsch für die böhmische Landwehr".

Since Prussia and the Prussian Army played a paramount role in the German states, the march is often played and is one of the most important German military marches. It is the traditional march of the Wachbataillon, the German Bundeswehr's elite drill unit, and is also played as the first march at the Grand Tattoo (Großer Zapfenstreich) and it was a march of the East German armed forces.

Outside of Germany, this march is also played in the Cuban Revolutionary Armed Forces.

== See also ==
- List of compositions by Ludwig van Beethoven
