= Bundeswehr traditions regulations =

Series of regulations by the Bundeswehr

The Bundeswehr regulations on traditions (Traditionserlass) are a series of regulations by the Bundeswehr developed in the 1950s that until today with revisions (1982, 2017), all in respect to the German military traditions that have had been upheld by its predecessor services before and the traditions in force today by the current service.

== Legal basis ==
The name Bundeswehr was first proposed by the former Wehrmacht general and centre-right politician Hasso von Manteuffel.

When the Bundeswehr was established in 1955, its founding principles were based on developing a completely new military force for the defence of West Germany. In this respect the Bundeswehr did not consider itself to be a successor to either the Reichswehr (1921–1935) of the Weimar Republic or Hitler's Wehrmacht (1935–1946). Neither does it adhere to the traditions of the National People's Army. Its official ethos is based on three major themes:

- the aims of the military reformers at the beginning of the 19th century such as Scharnhorst, Gneisenau, and Clausewitz
- the conduct displayed by members of the military resistance against Adolf Hitler, especially the attempt of Claus von Stauffenberg and Henning von Tresckow to assassinate him
- its own traditions since 1955

Thus, as a mark of having a separate tradition separate from its predecessor armed forces, the Traditional Regulations were enacted in 1965 in order that it would maintain only a few of the military traditions of the former armed services of Germany while at the same time keeping its own in the face of the changing world. The regulations were drafted by no less than Wehrmacht veteran and then Minister of Defense Kai-Uwe von Hassel.

== Traditions permitted to be upheld by the Bundeswehr ==
- Flag of Germany
- Coat of arms of Germany
- Deutschlandlied (National Anthem)
- Iron Cross
- Badge of Honour of the Bundeswehr
- Ich hatt' einen Kameraden
- Grand Tattoo Ceremony
- Ceremonial pledge taking
- Flag of Europe and Anthem of Europe

== See also ==
- Bundeswehr
