= Guard Regiment Hugo Eberlein =

- Regimental Insignia
- Active: 1956–1990
- Country: East Germany
- Branch: Land Forces of the National People's Army
- Type: Infantry
- Role: Mechanized Infantry
- Size: see Organization below
- Regimental Centre: Strausberg, Barnim-Kaserne

The Guard Regiment Hugo Eberlein, officially Wachregiment "Hugo Eberlein" and also known as NVA Wachregiment 2, was a military unit which provided security to the East German Ministry of National Defence. It was formed in 1956 as the Wachregiment der Hauptverwaltung Ausbildung ("Guard regiment of the Main Administration for Training"). It had its location at the East German Ministry of National Defence in Strausberg suburb near Berlin. The regiment was named after the Communist Hugo Eberlein, a victim of Stalin's purges.

Last commander of the Guard Regiment was in September 1990, Colonel Steinkopf.

== Mission ==
Unlike the Friedrich Engels Guard Regiment, the Hugo Eberlein regiment did not serve in protocol functions such as state visits, but provided for the security of installations and buildings of the Ministry of National Defence in Strausberg-Nord. Until 1962, this included guarding other properties in Berlin. Later there were troops that were part of three so-called honor companies. These were removed in 1962 and used to form Friedrich Engels Guard Regiment, which assumed these protocol duties.

== Organization ==
The guard regiment was organized as follows:

- Stabszug (Staff Platoon) with about 50 men, plus about 60 civilian employees
- I. Guard battalion with three companies of 100 men each, plus staff group
- II. Guard battalion with three companies of 100 men each, plus staff group
- Sicherstellungskompanie (Security Company) with about 100 men,
- Flugabwehr Abteilung (FlaAbt) (anti-aircraft group) of four batteries, each containing 36 men,
- Pionier Platoon with 30 men and
- Unteroffizierausbildungskompanie (NCO training company) (UAK), with about 120 men

== Uniforms ==
Its uniforms were nearly identical to those of those of National People's Army (NVA) and were distinguished primarily by the honorary cuffband on the left sleeve bearing the regiment's name.

== Equipment ==
Each guard battalion was equipped with 27 BTR-60 armored personnel carriers and an FlaKAbt (Anti-aircraft Detachmant with 27x 23mm ZPU-2 twin barreled 23mm antiaircraft guns.

== See also ==
- Wachbataillon – the Bundeswehr equivalent
- Felix Dzerzhinsky Guards Regiment – the Guard unit of the Stasi
