= Großer Zapfenstreich =

German military ceremony

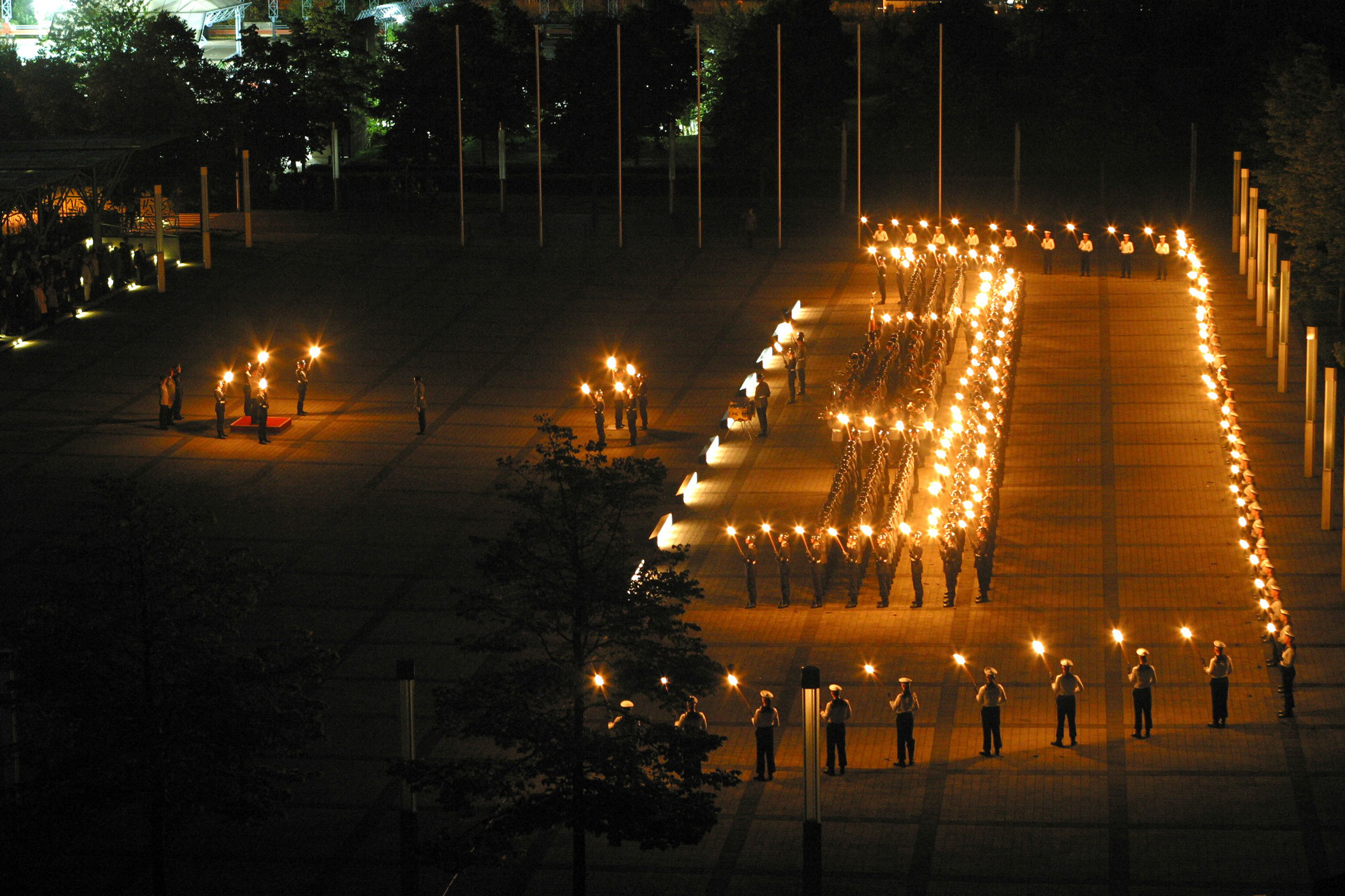
Soldiers of the Bundeswehr's Wachbataillon executing a Großer Zapfenstreich in Bonn (2002).

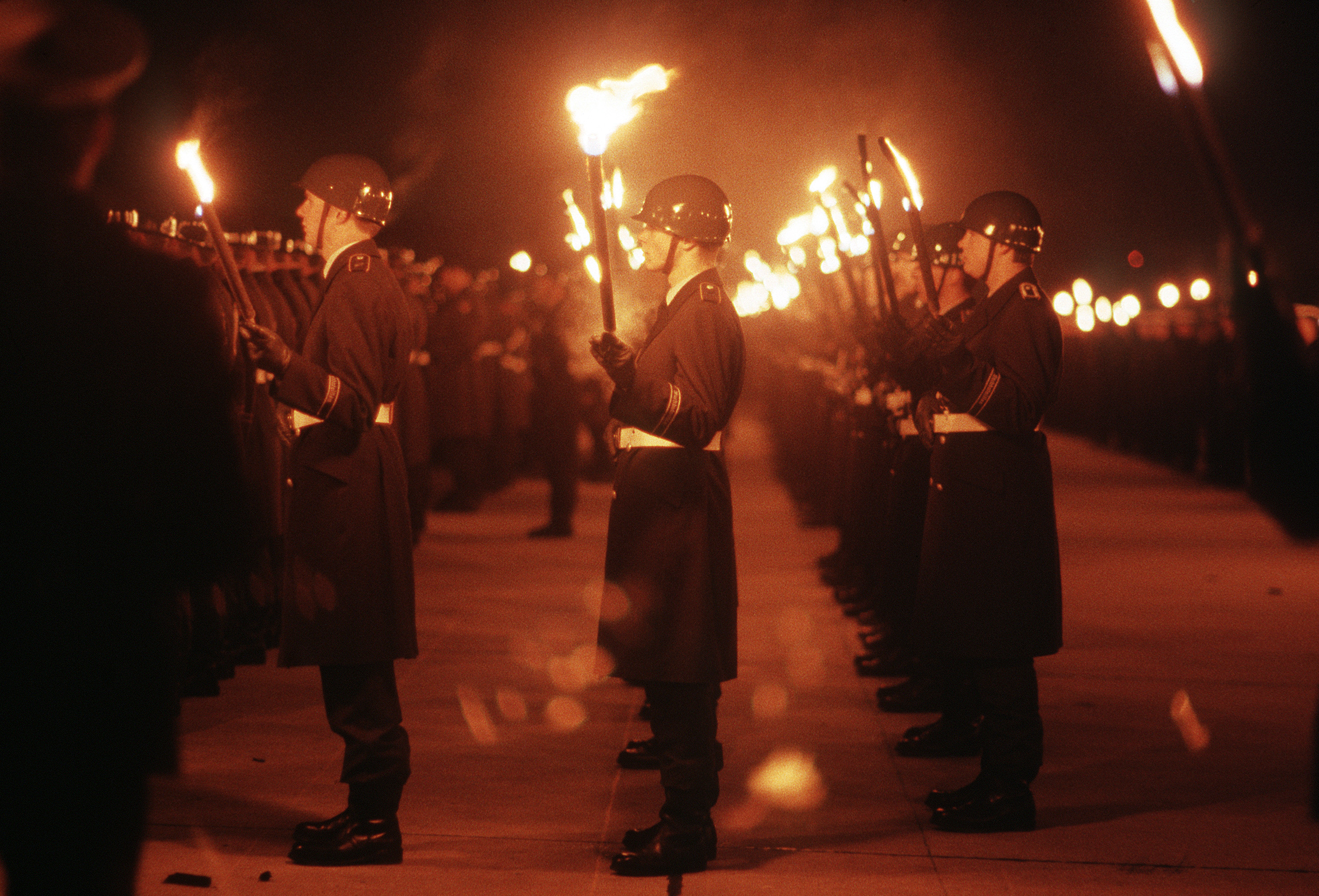
Großer Zapfenstreich Uniforms

The Großer Zapfenstreich ("Grand Tattoo", "Beating Retreat") is a military ceremony performed in Germany and Austria. It is similar to the military tattoo ceremony performed in English-speaking countries, and is the most important ceremonial act executed by the German federal armed forces, the Bundeswehr, and by the Austrian federal armed forces Bundesheer. The Zapfenstreich is performed only during national celebrations and solemn public commemorations, to honour distinguished persons present at such special events. Examples are the farewell ceremony for a German federal president, or at the conclusion of large military exercises. It takes place in the evening hours and consists of a military formation of at least one military band, two platoons of armed infantrymen, and two lines of soldiers carrying torches, in total about 400 men.

When foreign heads of state or military units are honoured, their respective national anthems are played.

== History ==
The Zapfenstreich originated in the military as a sign of the end of daily activities in both field and garrison. The term was mentioned for the first time in 1596. The Saxon major Hans von Fleming described this military custom for the first time in detail in his book Der vollkommene deutsche Soldat (The Perfect German Soldier, 1726). The Zapfenstreich was a trumpet signal to end the selling of liquor in the military quarters and to prepare for lights out. To underline that order, the sergeant major walked across the military camp and struck the taps of the casks with a stick. The word Zapfenstreich ("tap strike") is similar to the Dutch "tap toe", from which the English word tattoo comes. Like the tattoo military ceremony, the Zapfenstreich signifies completion of the day's work.

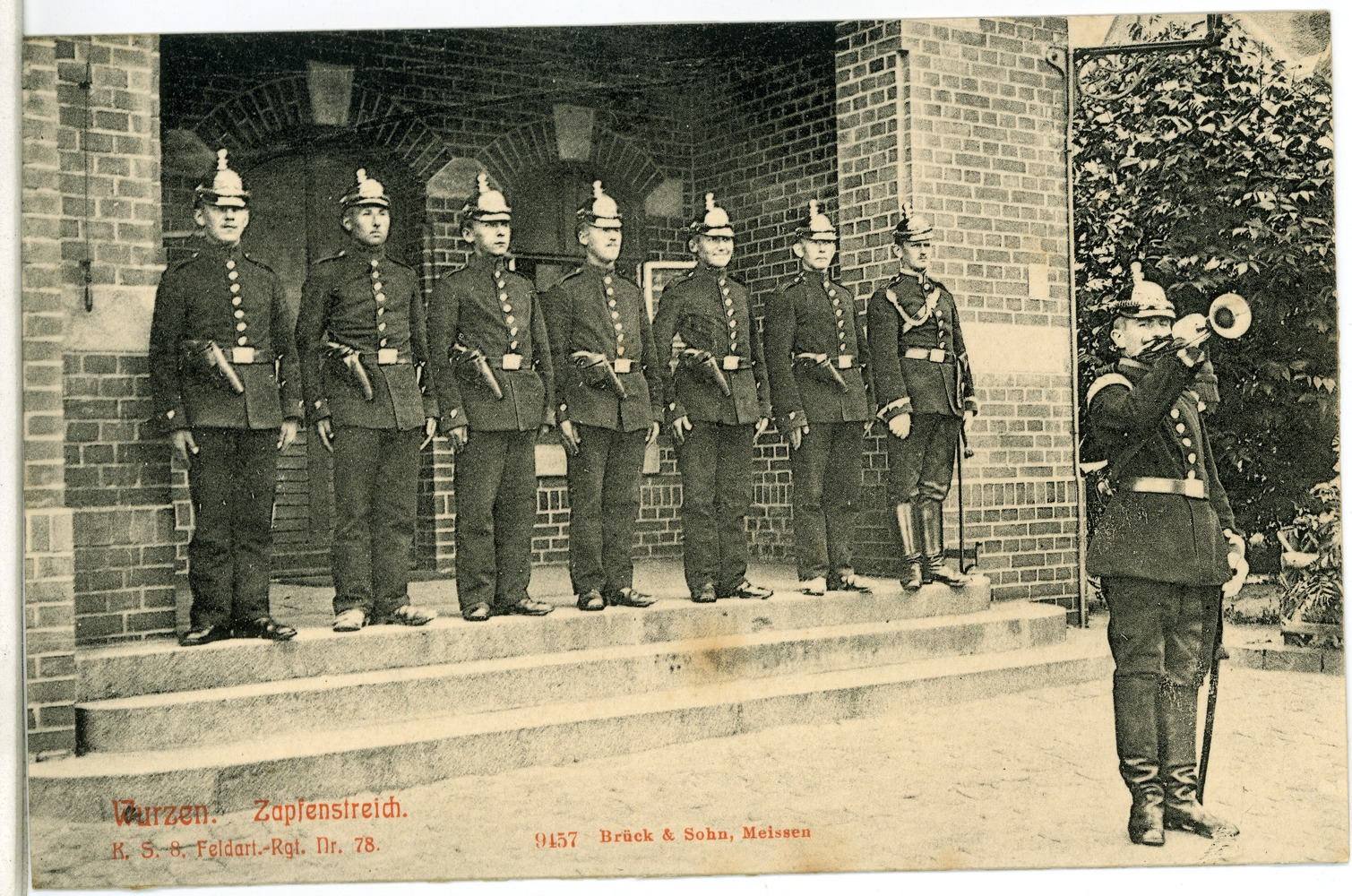
Brück & Sohn postcard depicting the ceremony in the German Empire.

In 1813 the Prussian king Friedrich Wilhelm III witnessed the evening ceremony of the Russian army after the battle of Großgörschen near Berlin. He was deeply impressed by the religious parts of the ceremony, especially the hymn How Glorious Our Lord composed by the Russian Royal musician Dmitry Bortniansky and a uniquely Russian tattoo march. The king ordered that a similar ritual be incorporated in the Prussian Zapfenstreich. In 1838, a Zapfenstreich in nearly its present form was prepared by Wilhelm Wieprecht, director of music of the bands of the Prussian Guard Corps, who arranged a great ("monstre") outdoor concert for the king and his guest, Tsar Nicholas I of Russia, in Potsdam. On 12 May over 1,000 musicians performed the newly rearranged Russian tattoo signals for a corps of drums, the rearranged Russian tattoo march, a newly composed set of cavalry tattoo signals, and the Russian church hymn, now retitled into German as "Ich bete an die Macht der Liebe" ("I pray to the power of love"), with newly commissioned text by Gerhard Tersteegen. After the founding of the German Reich in 1871, the emperor's hymn Heil Dir im Siegerkranz became part of the Zapfenstreich, but only when the emperor was present at the ceremony. Following the German Revolution the new national anthem, the "Deutschlandlied" by Hoffmann von Fallersleben, replaced the old imperial hymn in 1922.

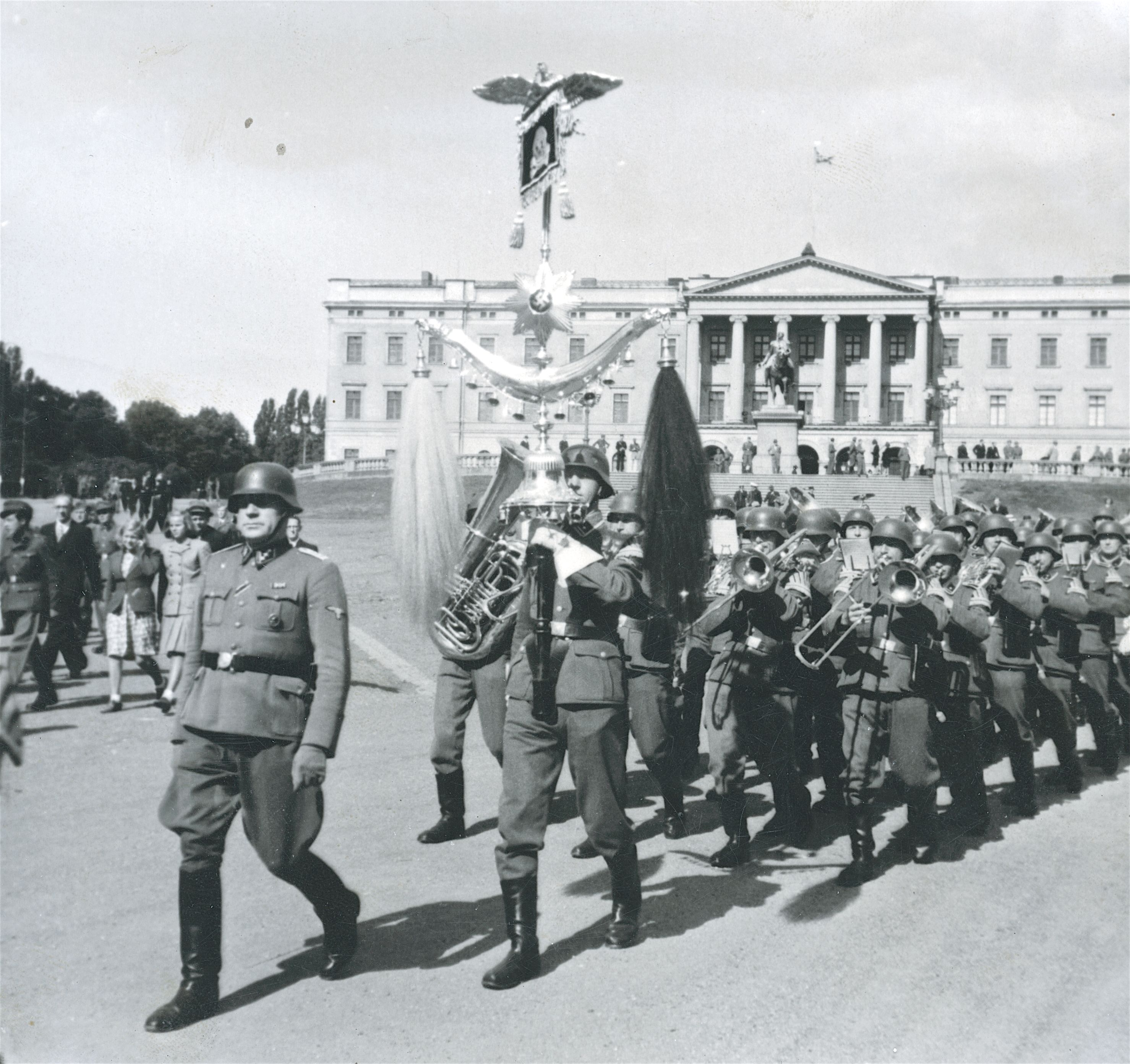
German Schutzstaffel and Norwegian volunteers of the Germanic SS participating in a ceremony in front of the Royal Palace in Oslo.

Due to the militaristic nature of Nazi Germany, the Großer Zapfenstreich was used extensively during the Third Reich, especially by the Wehrmacht and Schutzstaffel. The practice was also expanded to the German Police, when in 1938 Wilhelm Schierhorn composed Großen Zapfenstreich der Deutschen Polizei and it was renamed Großer Abendruf der Deutschen Polizei in 1940. The performance was intended only for use of police bands and military bands of the Allgemeine-SS.

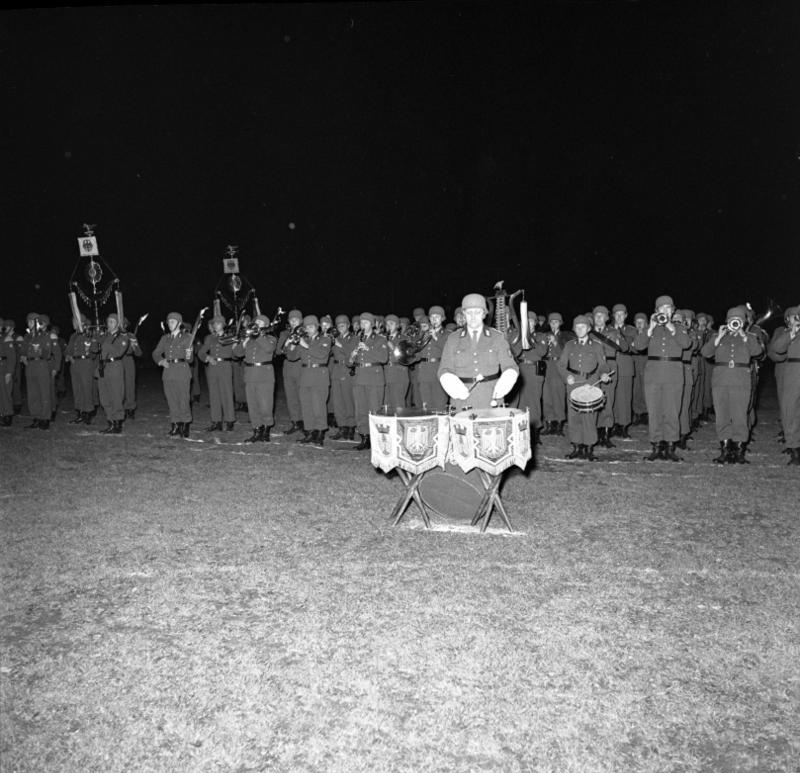
The ceremony in the early Federal Republic of Germany.

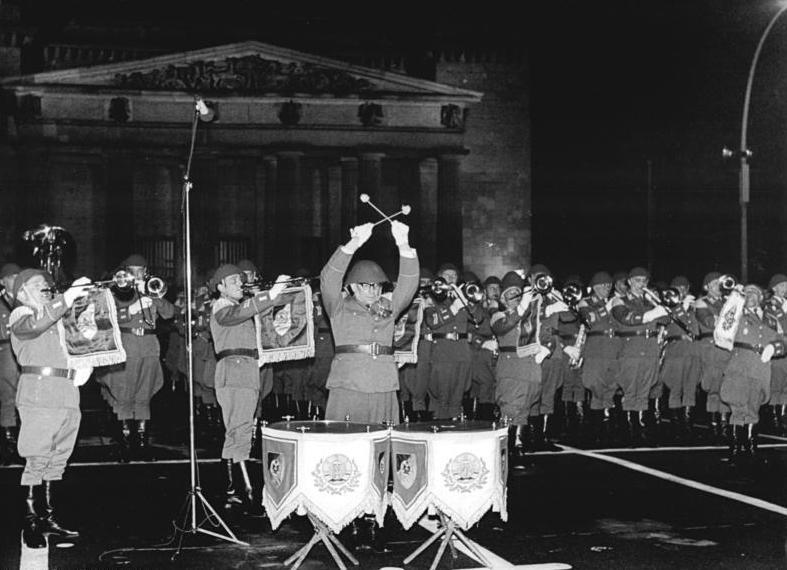
The Großer Zapfenstreich ceremony in the German Democratic Republic.

The German Democratic Republic reinstated the Großer Zapfenstreich in 1962 in an updated version, supplementing the traditional German ceremony with music based on "elements of the progressive military inheritance" including the song "For the Peace of the World" by Soviet composer Dmitri Shostakovich and a medley of songs and marches drawn from the German and international working-class movements. The hymn was replaced by a Russian funeral march honoring the martyrs of the Russian and German revolutions. The GDR national anthem replaced the Deutschlandlied. Other elements of the traditional Prussian ceremony—especially the torchlight procession, flourishes, and the Zapfenstreich March—were retained. The additions were an opening fanfare, inspection report of the unit commander, with the unit at present arms and eyes right, the presentation of the National People's Army Colors by the unit color guard, two fanfare calls by the fanfare section and kettle drummers, and a parade march past of the unit present in front of the honored guests after the reformation of the torchbearers and of the parade unit. The GDR's version, made official in 1981 and performed on March 1, NVA Day, and October 7, the GDR's National Day, and on several other occasions when needed, was made possible due to the support of longtime Director of Music of the NVA itself, Colonel Gerhard Baumann, who arranged some of the pieces that were used in the ceremony.

The practice spread to Austria: the first ever Großer Österreichischer Zapfenstreich for the Bundesheer was performed in 1965.

=== Composition of the Military Grand Tattoo ===
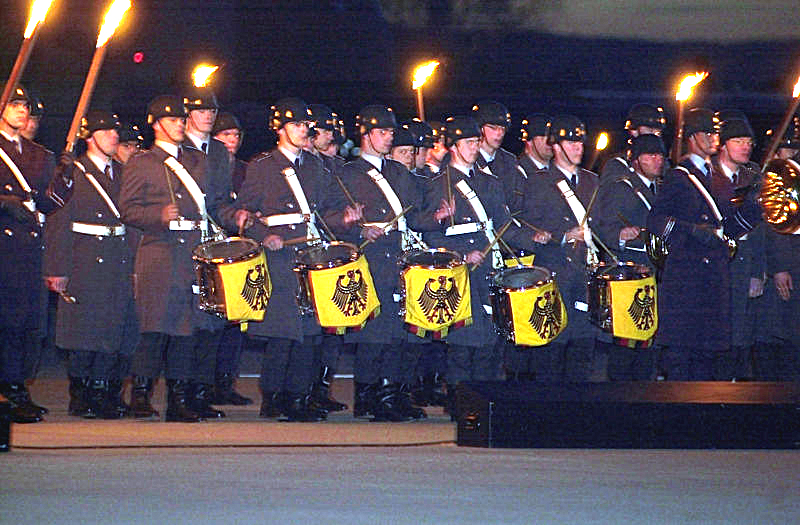
A corps of drums during a Zapfenstreich

West Germany/Germany (1952-53-present)

- Staff Band of the Bundeswehr (with 4 fanfare trumpeters and timpani)
- Corps of drums
- Two escort platoons of the Bundeswehr Wachbataillon or another deputized unit of the Bundeswehr
- Torchbearers (if drawn from the Wachbataillon, uniforms of the Luftwaffe are worn)
- Perlenkette (torchbearers forming a row and wearing uniforms of the navy if drawn from the Wachbataillon)

East Germany (1962–89)

- Central Band of the NVA (with fanfare section and 2 Timpani)
- Corps of Drums
- Honor battalion from the Friedrich Engels Guard Regiment of the National People's Army
- Sailors company from the Volksmarine
- Colour guard of the NVA
- Torchbearers

Austria

- Gardemusik Wien (in Vienna) or any regional band of the Austrian Armed Forces (two trumpet soloists from the band play during the ceremony)
- Two escort companies from the Austrian Armed Forces
- Color party
- Flag lowering section
- Torchbearers

== Performance ==
=== Modern German ===
The German Großer Zapfenstreich consists of various components today:

- Marching-up of the formation, the military band plays the Yorckscher Marsch by Ludwig van Beethoven
- Forming up and dressing the formation, post march of the torchbearers
- Report of the commanding officer formally opening the ceremony
- "Serenade": up to three or four songs chosen by the honoured person (in case of the Zapfenstreich performed at a dismissal), otherwise chosen by the acting military band
- Großer Zapfenstreich proper:
  - Locken zum Zapfenstreich (Announcing the tattoo proper) by the drummers and fifers
  - Preußischer Zapfenstreichmarsch (Prussian Tattoo March) by the band and the drummers
  - Retraite mit drei Posten (Retreat with three posts, i.e. traditional old cavalry signals) by the band and timpanist
  - Ruf zum Gebet (Calling to prayer) by the drummers and fifers
  - Gebet: "Ich bete an die Macht der Liebe" ("Kol Slaven" by Dmytro Bortniansky) by the band, timpanist and the drummers
  - Ruf nach dem Gebet (Call after the prayer) by the drummers and fifers and the band and timpanist
  - National anthem of Germany by the band, timpanist and the drummers
- Report for conclusion of the ceremony, return post march of the torchbearers
- Reformation into full parade order
- Marching out of the formation, the military band plays the Prussian Tattoo March again (in some civil bands, the Lockmarsch is used to signal the march-off and march past, and the Tattoo March is played optionally, instead another march is played by the band)

The Großer Zapfenstreich is the highest honour that the German Federal Armed Forces can render to a civilian. Two of the most impressive "Großen Zapfenstreiche" were those to mark farewell to the allied troops in Berlin in 1994 and on the occasion of the departure from office of the German chancellor Helmut Kohl in Speyer in 1998.

People who are entitled to be honoured with a "Großer Zapfenstreich" are:

- The President of Germany
- The Chancellor of Germany
- The Minister of Defence of Germany
- Generals and Lieutenant Generals (Admirals and Vice Admirals) of the Bundeswehr
- Supreme Allied Commander Europe (SACEUR)
- Chair of the NATO Military Committee (CMC)

Participants in the Großer Zapfenstreich involve at least a military band (with a timpanist and a minimum of 4-6 fanfare trumpeters) with an additional Corps of Drums of drummers and fifers, two escort platoons or companies, and an honor formation of torch carriers.

There may be regional variations by state. For example, the performance of the "Großer Zapfenstreich" in Bavaria differs slightly from the above: instead of the "Prussian Tattoo March" the "Bavarian Tattoo March" is played, and instead of the "Gebet: Ich bete an die Macht der Liebe" the "Bavarian Military Prayer" by Johann Caspar Aiblinger is played. The Saxon variant march, the "Saxon Tattoo March" is played when a Grand Tattoo is held in Saxony. In each case the state anthem is played before the German national anthem on state level occasions.

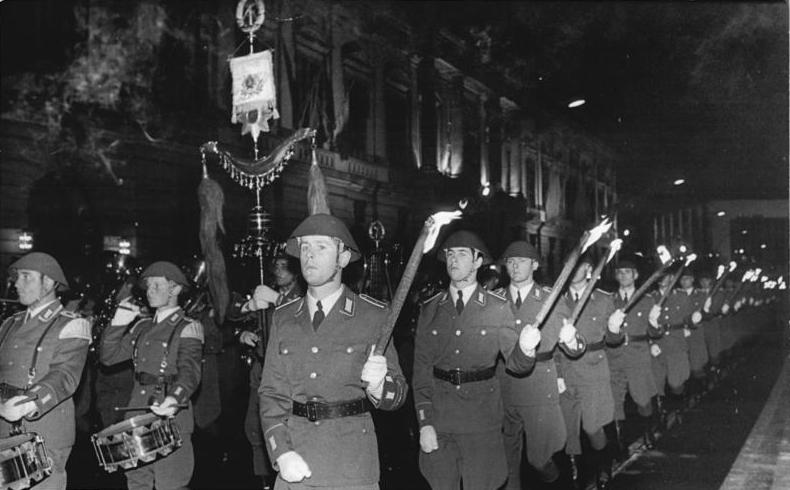
The band and torchbearers during a 1974 Großer Zapfenstreich to celebrate the 25th anniversary of the NVA.

=== East German ===
The East German Großer Zapfenstreich, although using the Prussian practice, was different in all respects. Its components, when summarized, are as follows:

- Formation march in, the military band plays the NVA Parade March no.1
- Formation halts in place, torchbearers post march followed by the formation turning into lines
- Formation then stands at ease, then falls in to be dressed
- Opening fanfare by the military band, fanfare section and timpanists
- Report of the commanding officer for the beginning of the ceremony proper
- Großer Zapfenstreich proper:
  - Locken zum Zapfenstreich (Announcing the tattoo) by the drummers and fifers
  - Preußischer Zapfenstreichmarsch (Prussian Tattoo March) by the band and the drummers and fifers
  - Festliche Zapfenstreichmusik (Festive Zapfenstreich Medley) by the band, Corps of Drums, fanfare section and timpanists. The medley is a potpourri of the various German and international socialist songs arranged for the band.
  - First fanfare by the fanfare trumpeters and timpanists
  - Ehrung der Opfer des Faschismus und Militarismus (Honors to the victims of Fascism and Militarism): the color guard marches in slow time to the center, then when it halts the color is then lowered to the tune of the Russian revolutionary funeral march "You Fell Victim" by the military band in honor of all those who died during the first German Communist revolutions of 1918-19, the Nazi regime and the subsequent resistance during the Second World War, and after the color is recovered the color guard marches off in quick time back to its place to the tune of the Corps of Drums
  - Second fanfare by the fanfare trumpeters and timpanists
  - Nationalhymne der DDR (National Anthem of the German Democratic Republic - Auferstanden aus Ruinen) by the band, fanfare section and timpanists
  - Zapfenstreichfinale (Grand finale of the Zapfenstreich) by the military band, fanfare section and timpanists - "For the Peace of the World" by Soviet composer Dmitri Shostakovich
- Reformation of the torchbearers
- Parade falls in attention and forms again into parade order
- March off and march past, the military band plays the Yorckscher Marsch as the parade marches past the dignitaries and when it marches off

=== Austrian ===
The Austrian version is different from the German one in many respects, and is more modern (the ceremony was first done in 1965). The ceremony is as follows:

- March in of the formation
- Forming up and dressing the formation, post march of the torchbearers
- Report of the commanding officer formally opening the ceremony
- Serenade by the band
- Großer Zapfenstreich proper
  - Opening fanfare and drumroll
  - Old Austro-Hungarian Zapfenstreich
  - Fanfare call by trumpeters
  - Drummer's Call
  - Retreat by the Band
  - Marches
  - Feu de Joie
  - Call to prayer
  - Evening Hymn
  - Prelude to the National Anthem
  - Performance of the National Anthem, Land der Berge, Land am Strome, Ode to Joy and the relevant state anthem, fife and drum sections omitted (including the lowering of the national flag)
  - Finale
- Final report of the commanding officer
- Formation into parade order
- March off of the formation

== Adaptation on civil events and occasions ==
The Grosser Zapfenstreich is also performed on civil occasions, or else called for by event organisers. In Germany, the difference is that civilian marching bands and civilian Corps of Drums are separated but play together during the ceremony. Fanfare bands (the German Fanfarenzug and Fanfarenkorps) are optional participants in the ceremony. They also have torchbearer formations, just as in the military version, when the ceremony is held in the evening or nighttime, but daytime ceremonies have none or have an optional use for the torchbearers. Only a civilian marching band does the Austrian version during civil events.

Some ceremonies call for armed civilian companies, while others opt for unarmed escorts. Special uniforms are worn by the civilian escort companies for the ceremony. In several German towns and cities, colours guards are also a part of the ceremony, with the Flag of Germany and the Flag of Europe as first in precedence among all the flags, together with organisational flags and guidons. The same is true in some Austrian towns and cities, as the Flag of Austria takes precedence over the other flags if there are any.

=== Composition of the Civilian Grand Tattoo ===
- Military band/Marching band/Brass band (with timpani and optional fanfare trumpeters, Germany only)
- Corps of Drums (Germany only)
- Fanfare band (Germany only)
- Civilian Escort Company/Battalion/Brigade (armed or unarmed)
- Colour/Colours Guards
- Colour party (if any, Austria only)
- Torchbearers

The full performance order of the ceremony is very much the same as in the military version, but a Feu de joie and an entrance of colours would be added in some cases (if these are present they are to be lowered when Ich bete an die Macht der Liebe (only in Germany) and the National Anthem are played). For the German civil ceremony the report to the reviewing officer or the guest of honour would optionally also have musical accompaniment by the band and the Corps of Drums, playing the Preussischer Präsentiermarsch if appropriate, in keeping with tradition.

== See also ==
- Bundeswehr
- National People's Army
- Austrian Armed Forces
- Sunset Parade
