= Neue Wache =

Historic memorial in Berlin, Germany

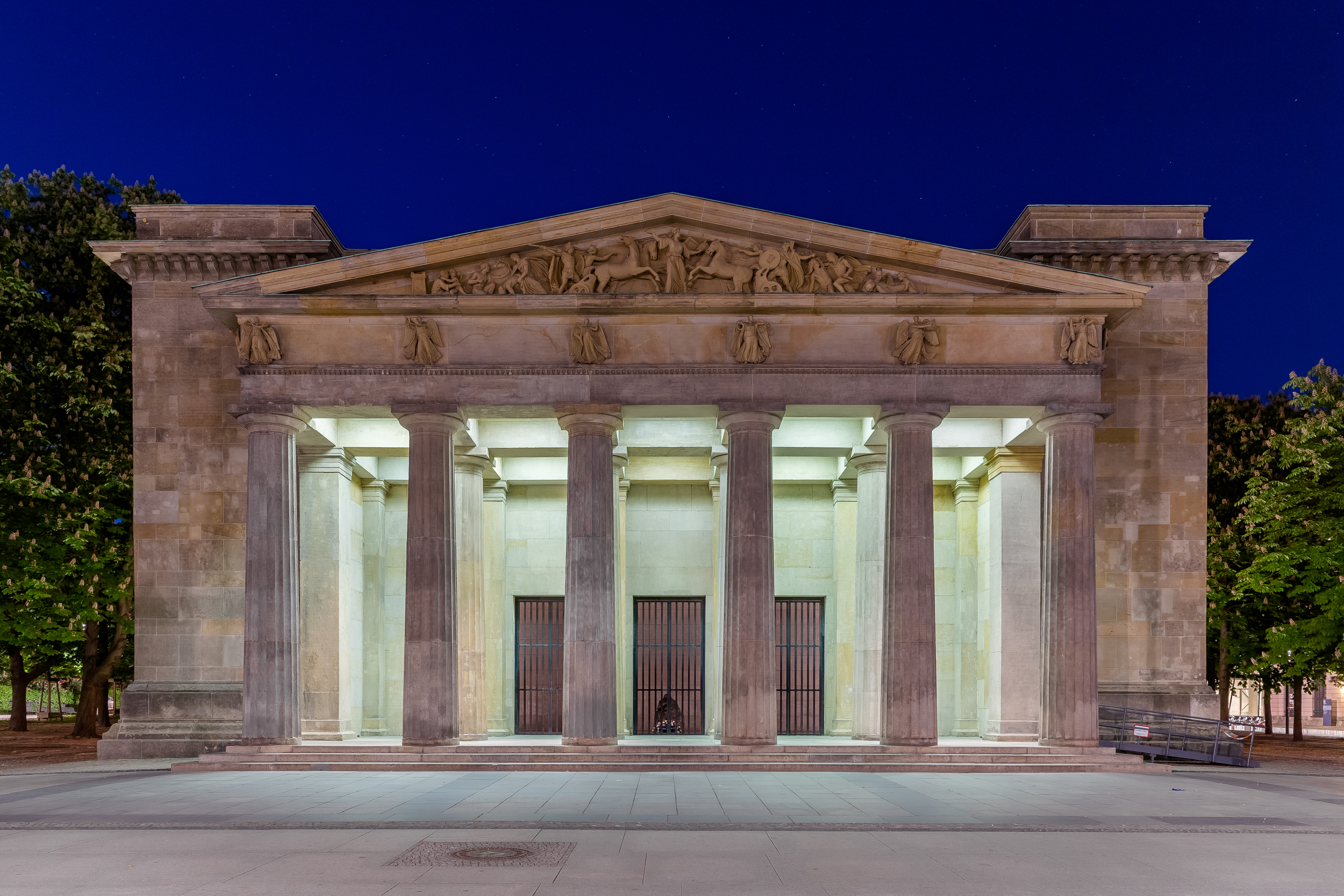

- Location within Berlin Location within Germany
- 52°31′03″N 13°23′44″E
- Location: Berlin, Germany

History
- Built: 1816-1818

Site notes
- Architect: Karl Friedrich Schinkel
- Architectural style: Greek Revival

The Neue Wache (lit. 'New Watchhouse') is a listed building on Unter den Linden boulevard in the historic centre of Berlin, Germany. Erected from 1816 to 1818 according to plans by Karl Friedrich Schinkel as a guardhouse for the Royal Palace and a memorial to the Liberation Wars, it is considered a major work of Prussian Neoclassical architecture. A Victoria pedimental sculpture by Johann Gottfried Schadow and five General statues by Christian Daniel Rauch, referring to the Warrior statues on Schlossbrücke, also belong to the ensemble. Since 1931, it has held Germany's Tomb of the Unknown Soldier and national memorial for the First World War. Following German Reunification, the site has also been, since 1993, the Central Memorial of the Federal Republic of Germany to the Victims of War and Tyranny.

Neue Wache is famous for its changing of the guard ceremony, which went unchanged throughout the 20th century despite radical changes to the German political system. Neue Wache, though, no longer has a regular honor guard except during special events. The modern changing of the guard lacks the goose step once continued by the East German Army, but is otherwise nearly identical to the old ceremony.

== History ==
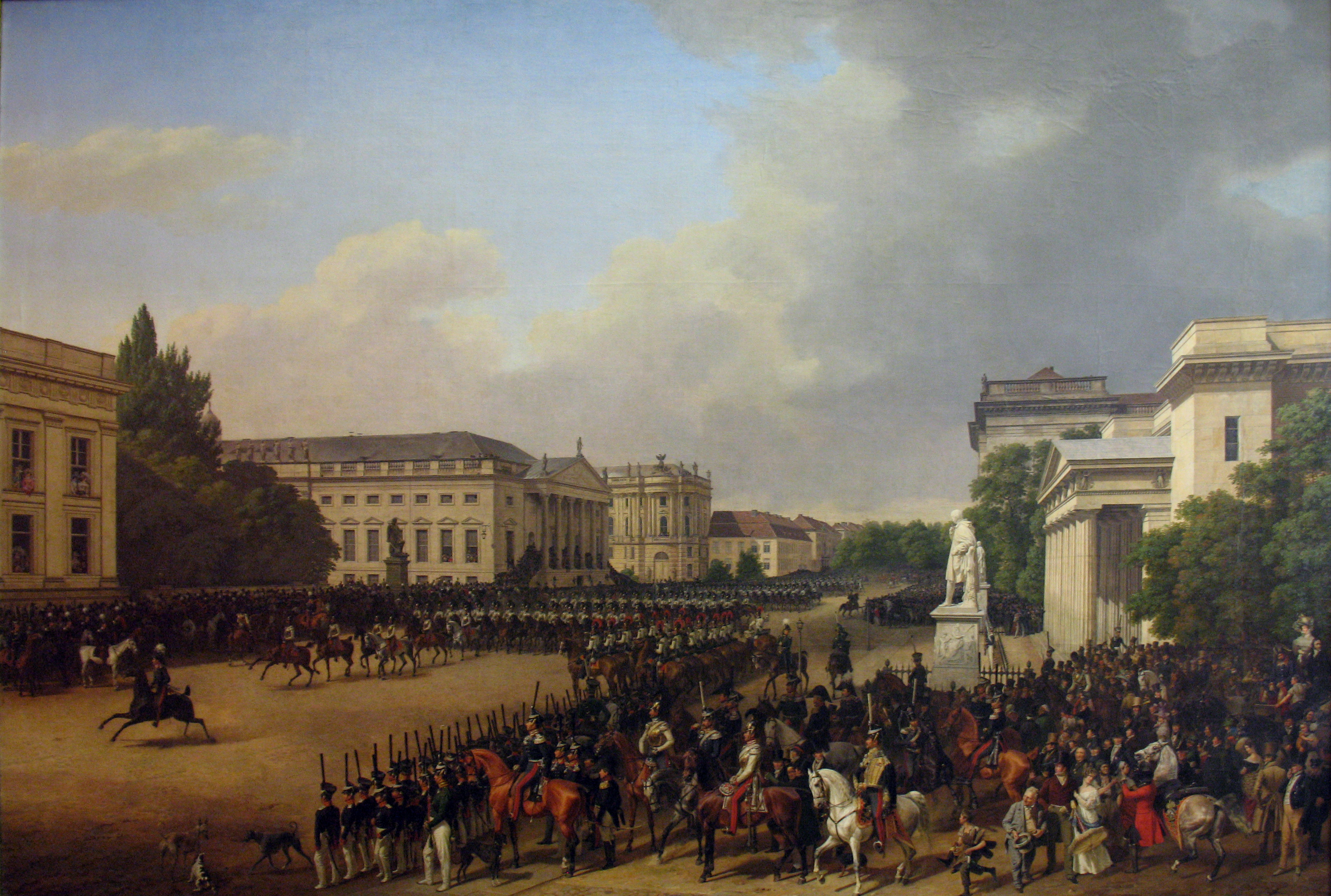
Parade in the Opernplatz in Berlin by Franz Krüger, 1830. The Neue Wache is on the right.

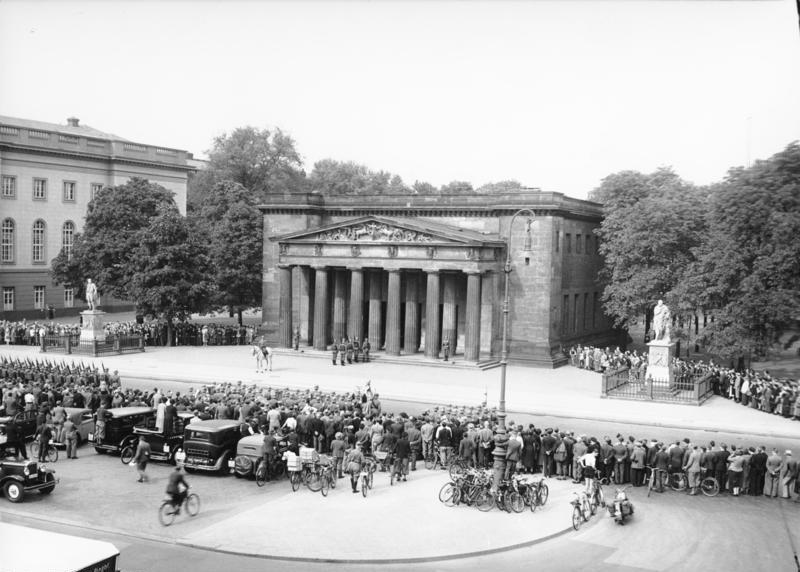
Original view of the Neue Wache with flanking statues of von Scharnhorst and von Bülow, 1938

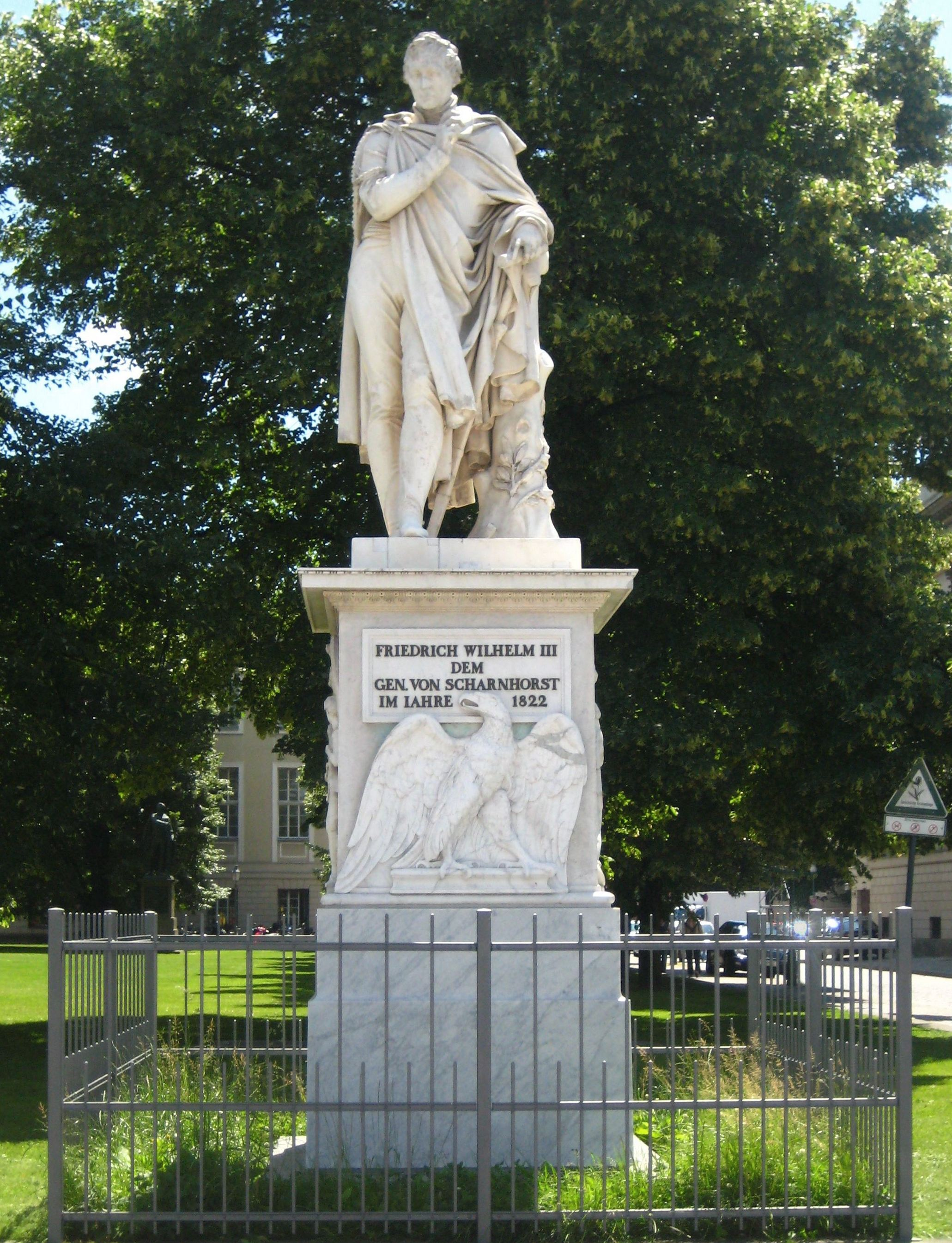
Scharnhorst statue, originally erected next to the Neue Wache

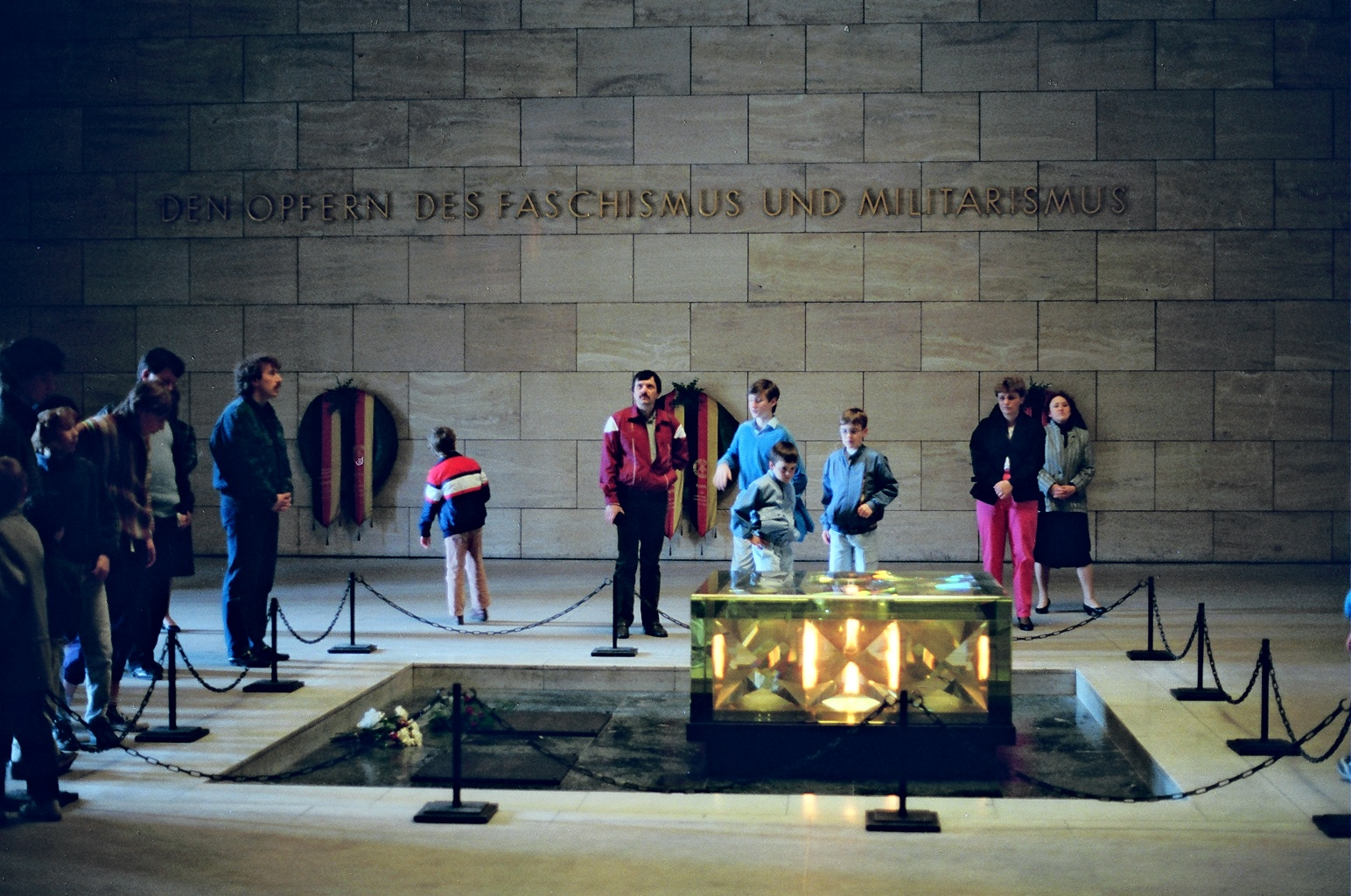
The glass prism (with eternal flame) in 1987

King Frederick William III of Prussia ordered the construction of the Neue Wache as a guardhouse for the Königliches Palais (Royal Palace), his palace across the road, to replace the old Artillery Guardhouse. He commissioned Schinkel, the leading exponent of Neoclassical architecture, to design the building: this was Schinkel's first major commission in Berlin. The Neue Wache was inaugurated on 18 September 1818 by the Prussian 1st Guards Grenadiers on occasion of the official visit of Tsar Alexander I of Russia.

Located between the Zeughaus and the Humboldt University, the plain building is characterised by four massive corner risalits and a portico of Doric columns, of the original Greek form, without bases. Schinkel wrote of his design: "The plan of this completely exposed building, free on all sides, is approximately the shape of a Roman castrum, thus the four sturdier corner towers and the inner courtyard." The statuary in the tympanum is intended as a memorial to Prussia's role in the Napoleonic Wars, whose final stage is known in Germany as the Wars of Liberation. It shows Nike, the goddess of victory, deciding a battle. The triglyphs and guttae of the Doric order are omitted. The Jewish architect Salomo Sachs (1772–1855) describes in his autobiography that his architectural designs for the Neue Wache, submitted in 1806 for the Academy Exhibition in Berlin, served as the basis for Schinkel's executed plans.

Here I cannot fail to point out how the basic features of the building complex up to the new guardhouse, as it stands there now, correspond to mine. At first I had put this building on aligned, not with the armoury but with the university. The peculiarity of my construction was that the façade was actually formed by the rear front (high wall), in that the roof was to have its waste only towards the rear. In addition, two short side wings, connected by a Blinding-Masonry at the back and enclosing a small courtyard, were placed in such a way that the whole was a closed square. Finally, the façade was decorated with 6 Doric columns and two pavilions on each side. I hope that nobody will take offence at the comparison I am making here between Schinkel's design and my earlier project of one and the same building, because I am not talking about Schinkel's elaborate decoration of the building, but only about the adaptation of the execution and the construction.

— Salomo Sachs, My fifty year of services and literary Work A contribution to the thematic illumination of the question "Are Jews for state service are suitable?" (For the benefit of the Berlin poor) Berlin, 1842 printed by F. Weidle

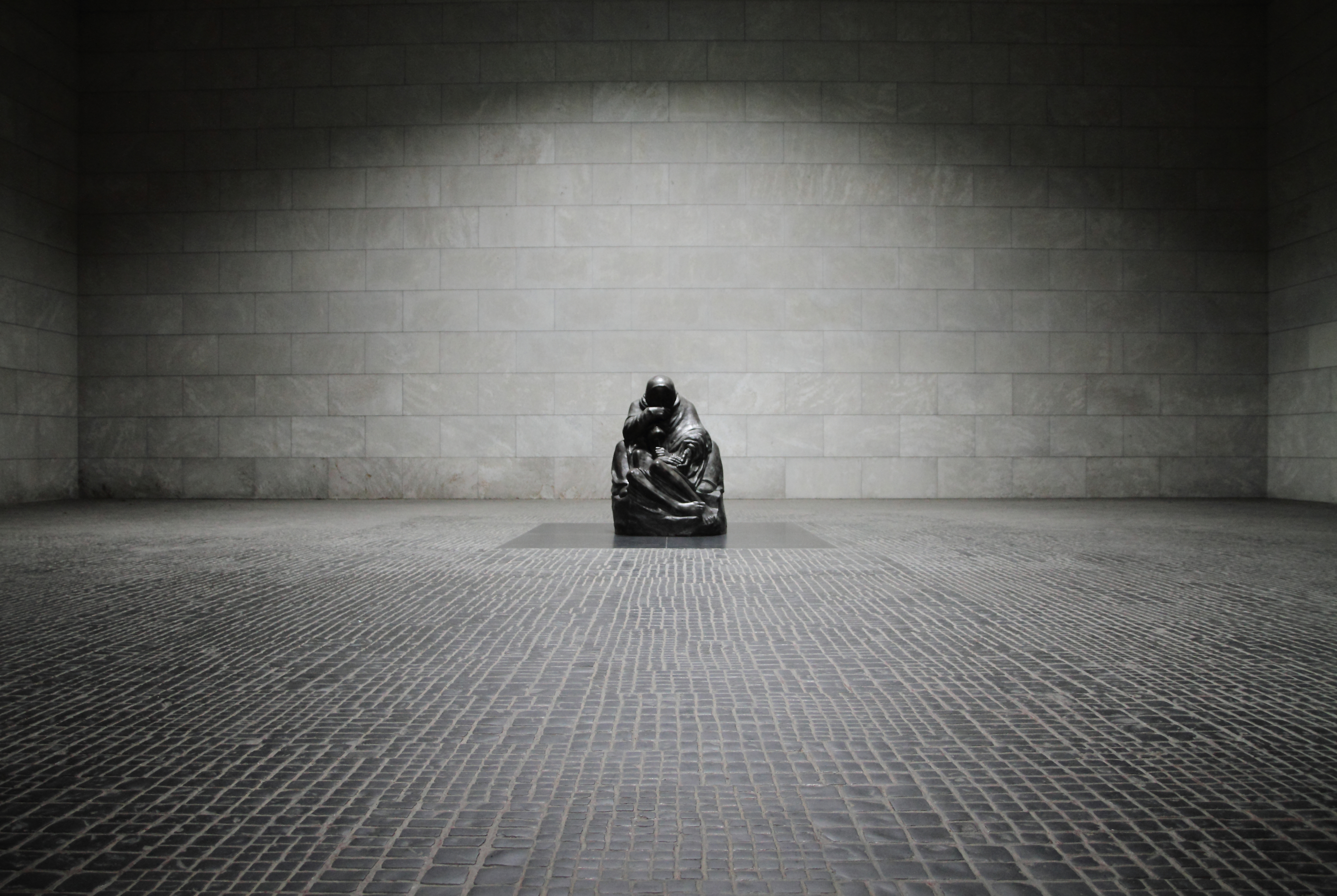
Today's interior of the Neue Wache with Käthe Kollwitz's statue Mother with her dead son

The building served as a royal guard house until the end of World War I and the fall of the monarchy in the German Revolution of 1918–19. In 1931 the architect Heinrich Tessenow was commissioned by the Free State of Prussia to redesign the building as a war memorial to commemorate those who died in the Great War. Tessenow converted the interior into a memorial hall centered around a black granite block with an oak wreath designed by the sculptor Ludwig Gies, situated under an oculus (circular skylight). The Neue Wache was then known as the Memorial of the Prussian State Government. After the Nazi Party took power, the building played a vital role as the site of the annual Heroes' Memorial Day celebrations held by the Nazis and the Nazi German armed forces. The Neue Wache was heavily damaged by bombing and by artillery fire during the Battle of Berlin in the last months of World War II.

After the war, the Mitte district was located within the Soviet sector of Allied-occupied Berlin and from 1949 was part of East Berlin, the de facto, but not de jure, capital of East Germany. Prior to the 1951 communist World Festival of Youth and Students, the East German leader Walter Ulbricht had two neoclassical marble statues of Gerhard von Scharnhorst and Friedrich Wilhelm Bülow by Christian Daniel Rauch removed from the sides of the portico (positioned on the south side of Unter den Linden since 2002). From 1957 the East German authorities had the Neue Wache rebuilt and reopened in 1960 as a Memorial to the Victims of Fascism and Militarism. In 1969, the 20th anniversary of the East German state, a glass prism structure with an eternal flame was placed in the centre of the hall. The remains of an Unknown Soldier and of a nameless Nazi concentration camp victim were enshrined in the building. Two soldiers of the Friedrich Engels Guard Regiment served as permanent honor guards and a guard mounting ceremony was held every Wednesday and Saturday, becoming a major tourist attraction.

After German reunification, the Neue Wache was again rededicated in 1993 as the Central Memorial of the Federal Republic of Germany for the Victims of War and Tyranny. At the personal suggestion of the Federal Chancellor of Germany Helmut Kohl, the East German memorial piece was removed and replaced by an enlarged version of Käthe Kollwitz's sculpture Mother with her Dead Son. The pietà-style sculpture is directly placed under the oculus, and so is exposed to the rain, snow and cold of the Berlin climate, symbolizing the suffering of civilians during and after both World Wars. In addition, there has also been discussion about returning the neoclassical statues back to their original places (next to and opposite the Neue Wache) from where they had been removed by order of Walter Ulbricht.

== See also ==
- List of tourist attractions in Berlin
- La Madeleine, Paris (Paris, France)
- Kazan Cathedral, Saint Petersburg (Saint Petersburg, Russia)
- Palais Bourbon (Paris, France)
- Palais Brongniart (Paris, France)
