= Wachbataillon =

Guard unit of the German Bundeswehr

Coordinates: 52°33′23.68″N 13°19′09.84″E

Guard Battalion at the Federal Ministry of Defence
- Wachbataillon beim Bundesministerium der Verteidigung
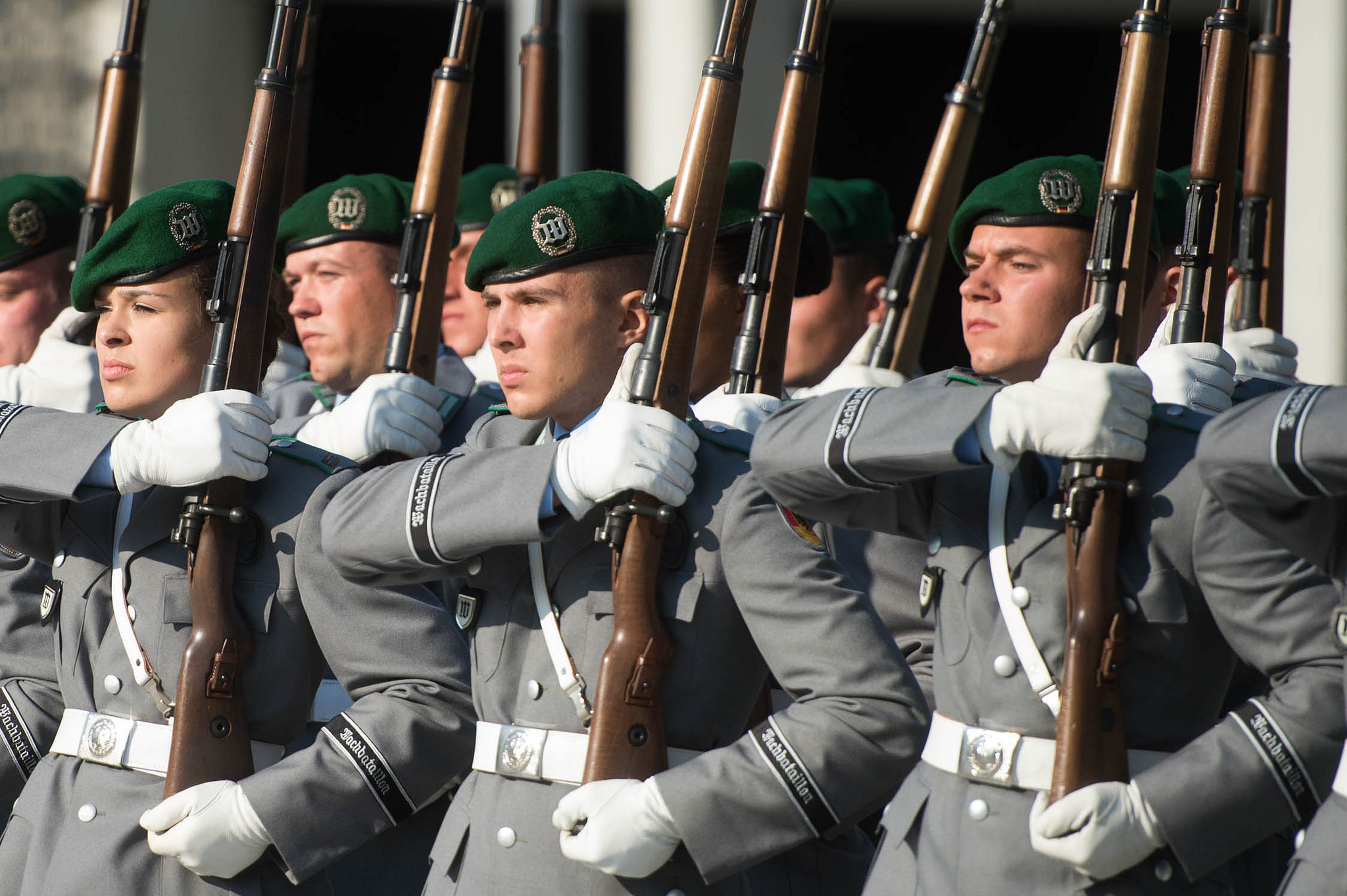
- Wachbataillon members shoulder arms in formation at the Defense Ministry in Berlin.
- Active: 15 February 1957 - present
- Country: Germany (West Germany to 1990)
- Branch: Streitkräftebasis Bundeswehr
- Type: Army, Navy, Air Force, Jägertruppe (Army part)
- Role: Drill, ceremonial and guarding and security duties
- Size: 7 active companies
- Part of: Bundeswehr Military Police Command
- Garrison/HQ: Berlin
- Nickname: Protter or Protokollsoldaten
- Motto: Semper talis (always the same/great)
- March: Yorckscher Marsch

Commanders
- Current commander: Oberstleutnant Maik Teichgräber

Insignia
- Shoulder sleeve insignia of the Wachbataillon

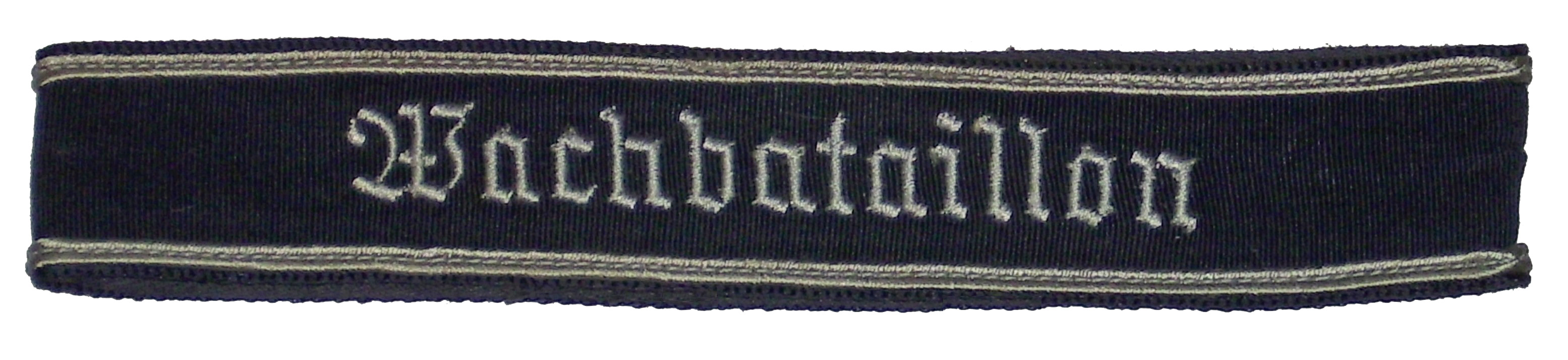
- Cuff title of the Wachbataillon

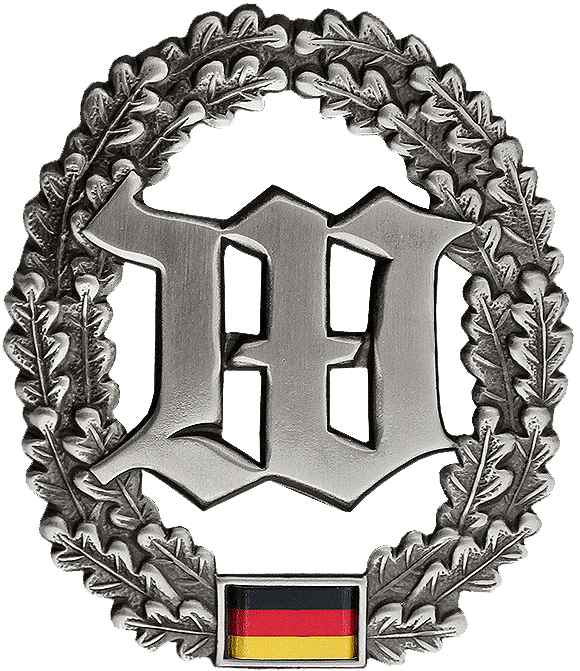
- Beret badge of the Wachbataillon

The Wachbataillon (full name: Wachbataillon beim Bundesministerium der Verteidigung [WachBtl BMVg], lit. 'Guard Battalion at the Federal Ministry of Defence') is an infantry unit of the Bundeswehr.

Its two missions are providing military honors—for both the Federation and the Bundeswehr—and protecting the facilities and official seats of the Federal Government and the Federal President during state of tension or state of defence.

It consists of seven active companies (see list below) and belongs to the Streitkräftebasis (Joint Service Support Command) of the Bundeswehr. The soldiers of the Wachbataillon often refer to themselves as Protter or Protokollsoldaten, meaning protocol soldiers.

== Mission ==
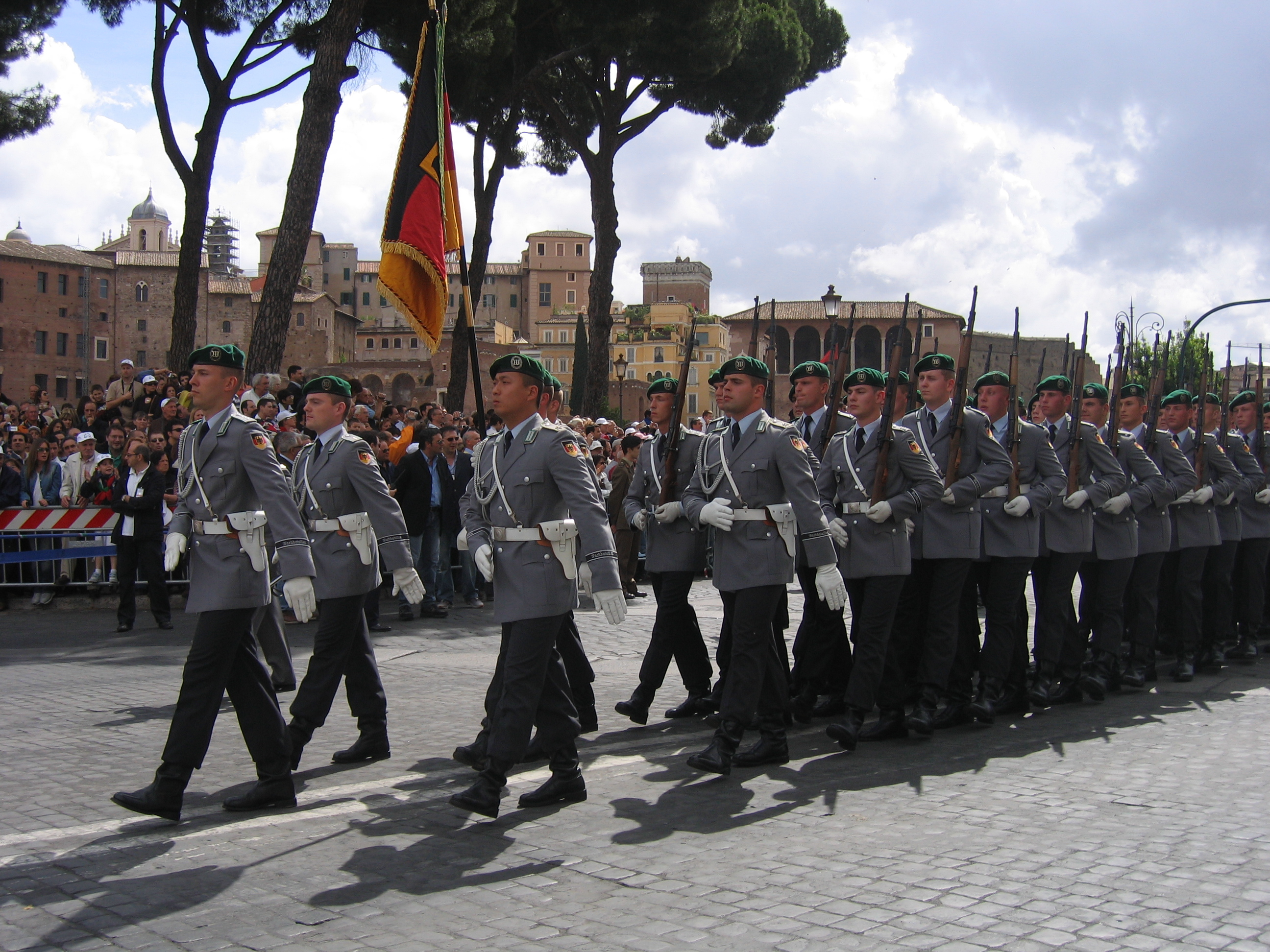
German Wachbataillon soldiers on parade in Rome

The primary mission of the Wachbataillon is to perform the military honours for the German president, the German Chancellor, the Federal Minister of Defence and the Inspector General of the Bundeswehr during state visits or on comparable occasions.

The Wachbataillon executes the Großer Zapfenstreich ("Grand Tattoo") on special occasions (for example on the 50th anniversary of the Bundeswehr in front of the Reichstag in Berlin on the night of 26 October, 2005) or takes part in events like the ceremonial oath of the Bundeswehr ceremony, parades, state funerals, military tattoos and shows with its drill team which is the best trained special unit of the battalion.

A secondary mission is to perform (ceremonial) guard duty at the Ministry of Defence and other high-profile public places and to protect and guard members of the German government and the Ministry of Defence.

Another secondary mission is to secure and defend the alternate seat of the federal German government in conjunction with the Federal Police forces. Therefore, all soldiers of the Wachbataillon are trained as infantrymen and do regular exercises on military training areas (Truppenübungsplatz) in addition to their protocol duties.

== Recruitment ==
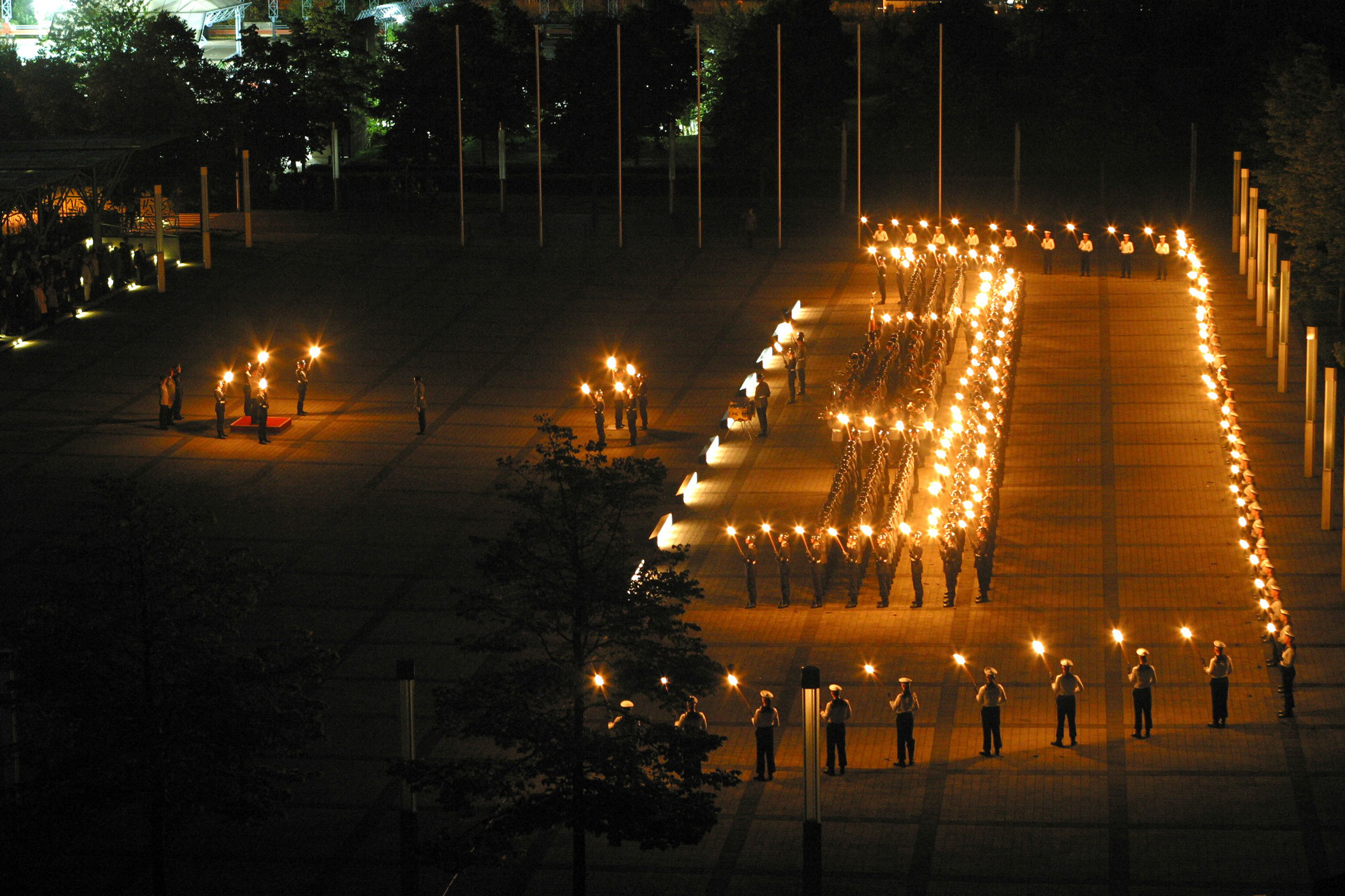
Wachbataillon personnel executing a Großer Zapfenstreich

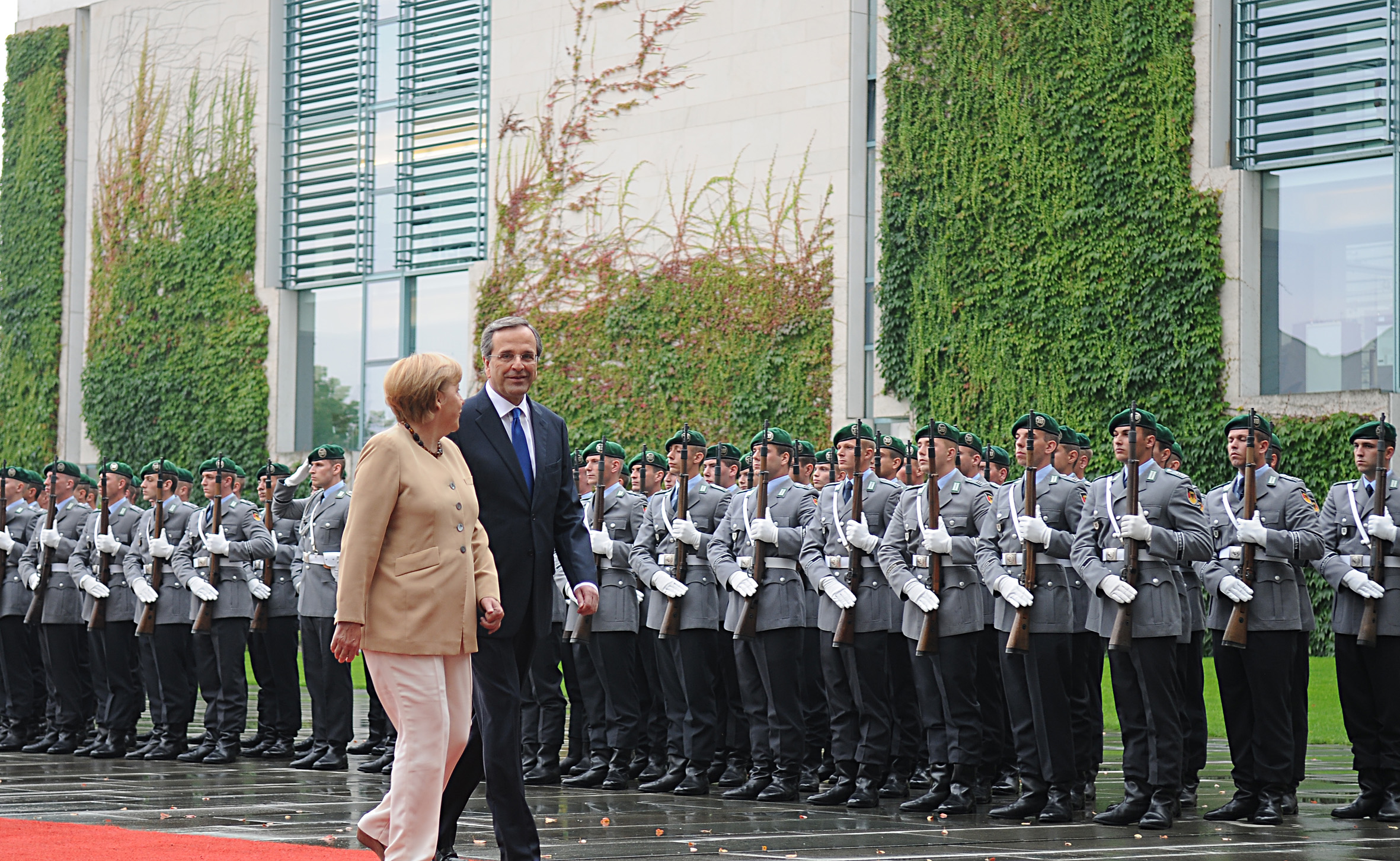
Wachbataillon personnel in Army uniforms perform the military honours for the German Chancellor Angela Merkel and Greek Prime Minister Antonis Samaras on 24 August 2012.

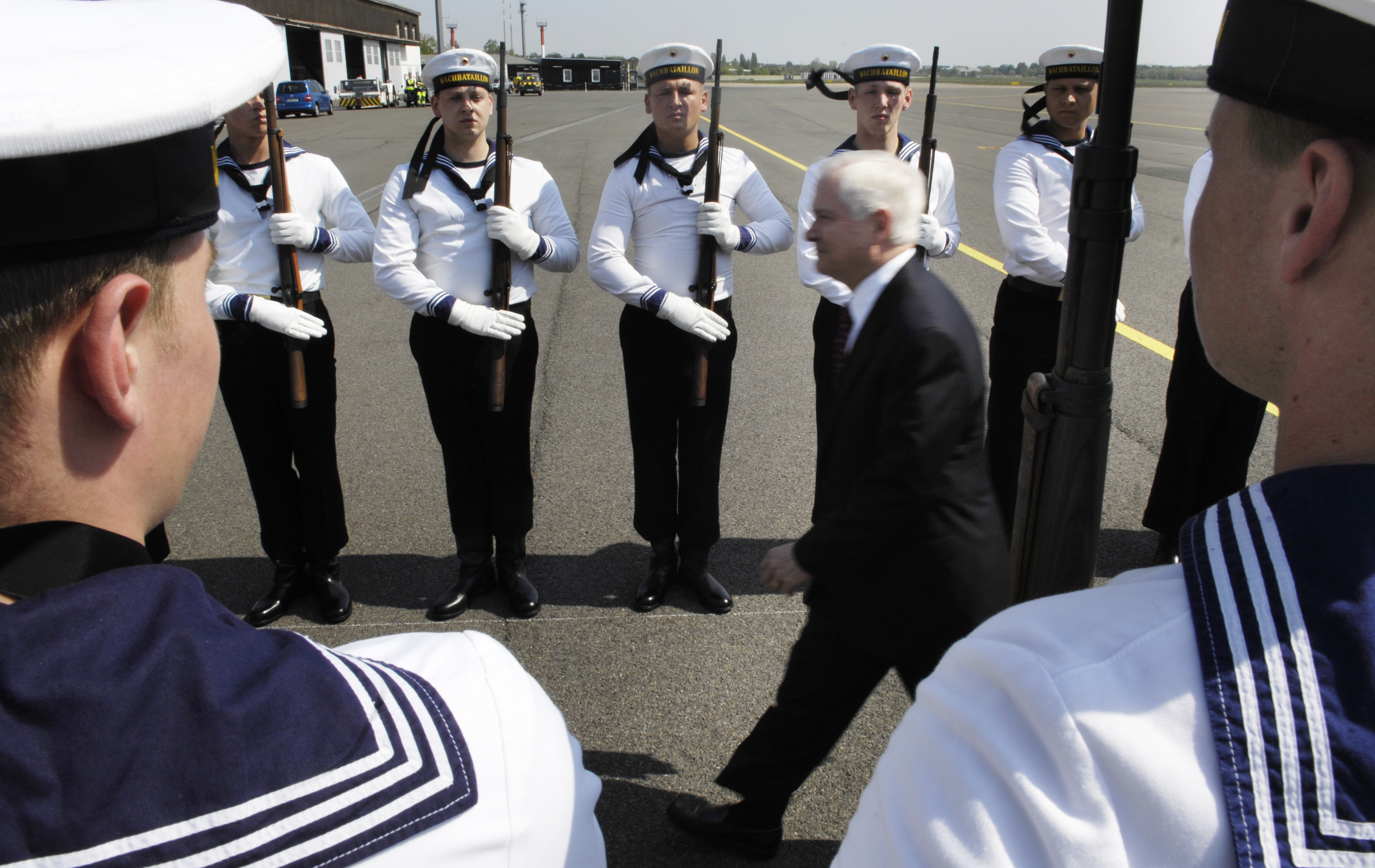
Wachbataillon personnel in Navy uniforms greet U.S. Defense Secretary Robert M. Gates as he arrives in Berlin on 25 April 2007.

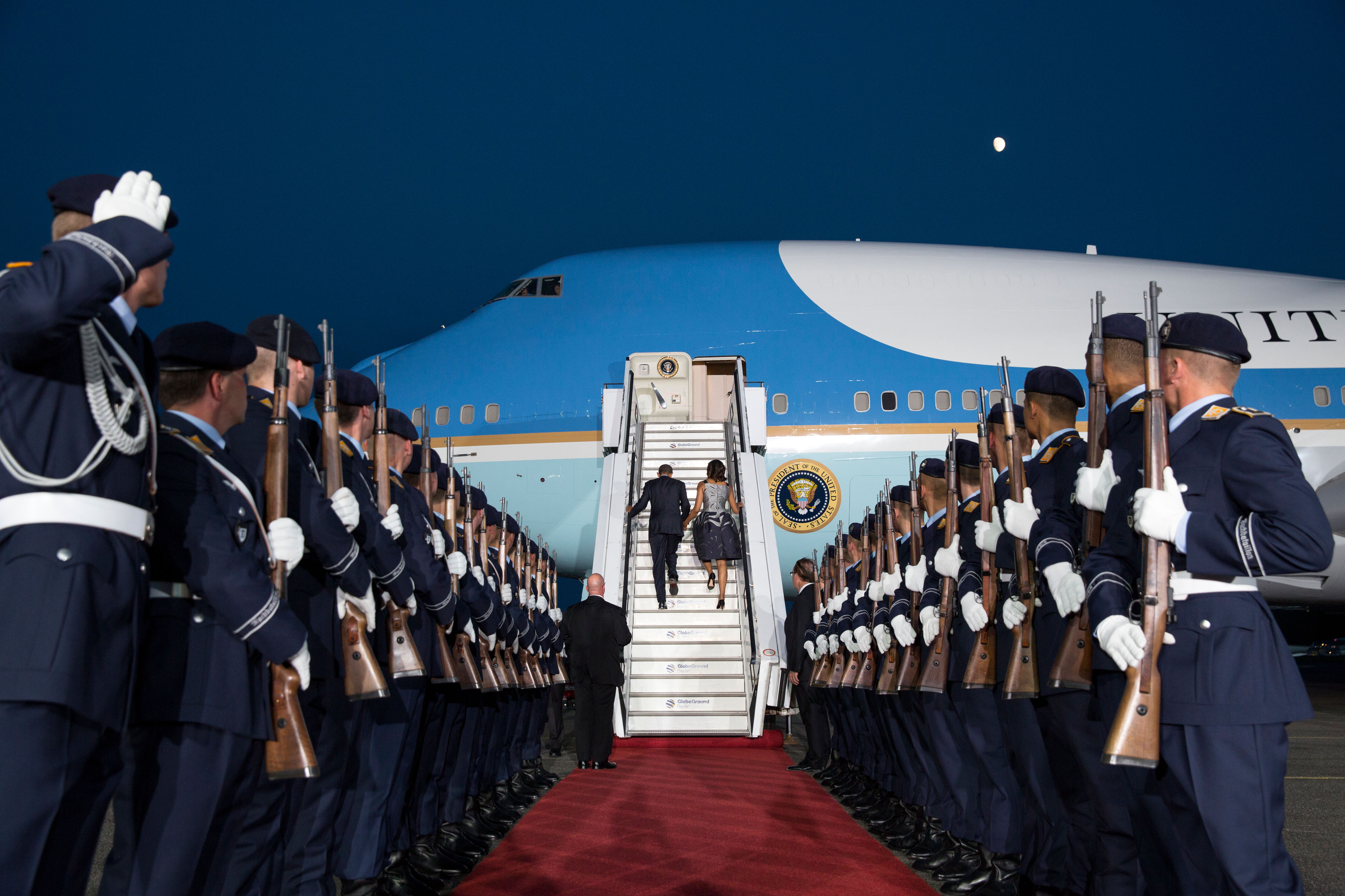
Wachbataillon personnel in Air Force uniforms at the boarding of U.S. President Barack Obama and Michelle Obama on Air Force One at the end of their visit to Germany on 19 June 2013.

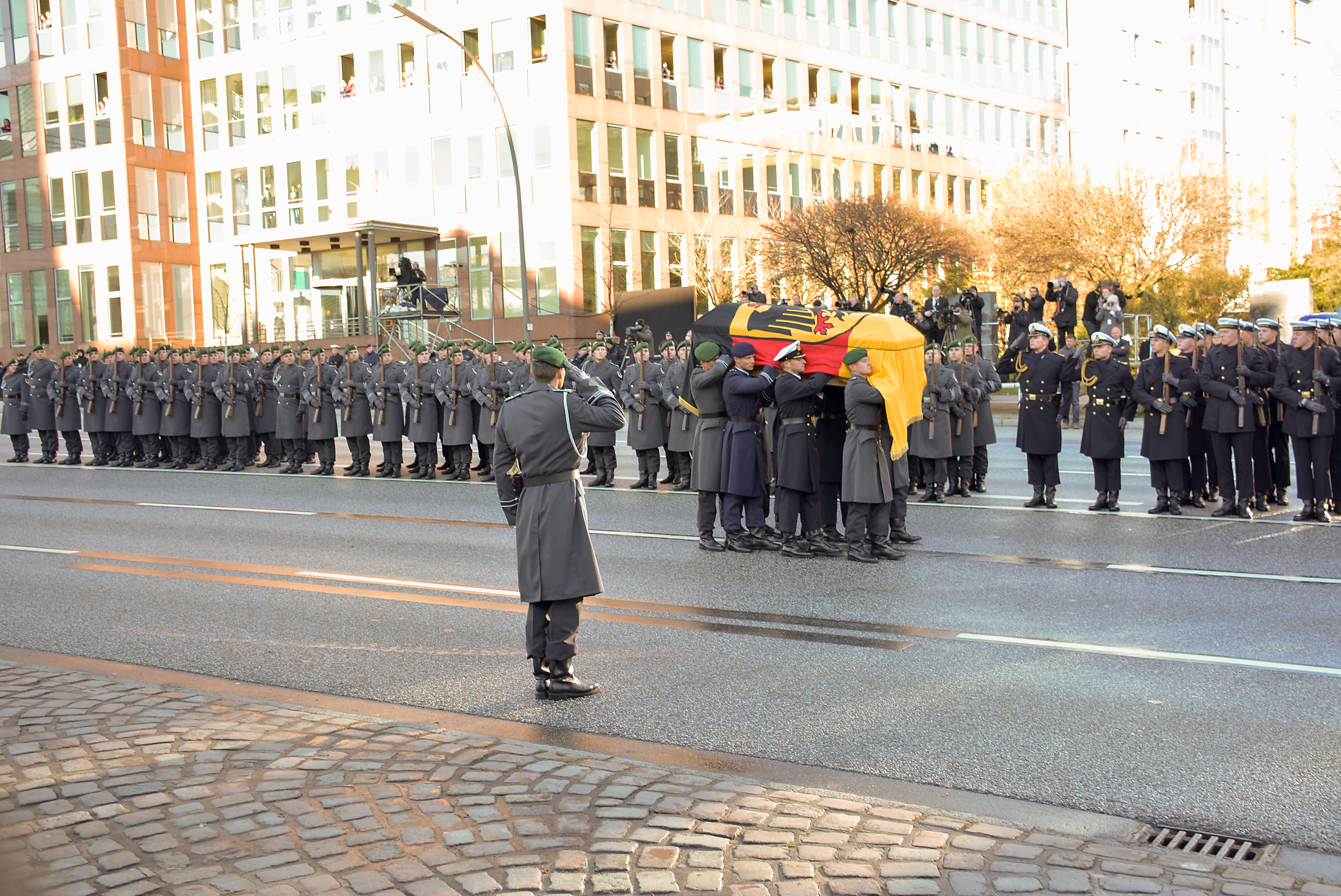
Wachbataillon personnel executing a Großes Ehrengeleit at the state funeral of former Chancellor of West Germany Helmut Schmidt on 23 November 2015.

Until recently, the Wachbataillon protocol- and security companies only admitted male personnel that had a body height ranging from 1.79 meters (5 ft 10 in) up to 1.93 meters (6 ft 4 in), normal eyesight and body weight and are generally in good health. Wachbataillon personnel (especially protocol soldiers) still are not allowed to grow beards or moustaches as well as wearing glasses or being overweight (Bierbauch). These are internally known as the "three forbidden B's" (verbotene drei Bs – keine Brille, kein Bart, kein Bauch). At the "Ehrengeleit" (escort of honor) after the death of the well known and veteran politician Wolfgang Schäuble several soldiers were seen with beards. Since 2024 beards are officially allowed in the Wachbataillon.

Since 2009, the 1./WachBtl BMVg staff- and supply company has admitted female personnel. In the Großer Zapfenstreich for Karl-Theodor zu Guttenberg in March 2011, the first female soldier performed the role of torchbearer. Until the end of conscription in Germany in July 2011, about 80 per cent of Wachbataillon's personnel were conscripts. The requirements for Wachbataillon personnel were relaxed to a body height ranging from 1.75 meters (5 ft 9 in) up to 2.00 meters (6 ft 7 in), no visible visual aids and having a good general fitness. In March 2012 the first female officer took command of a platoon of the Wachbataillon.

The soldiers of the Wachbataillon are from all three German armed services (i.e. army, navy and air force) and have the uniforms from all forces at their disposal to be able to perform any drill mission on every occasion. Green berets are used for army uniform, the (dark) blue beret for air force and the navy wears traditionally the sailor suit (Matrosenanzug). The beret badge for army and air force uniform shows the letter "W" as an abbreviation for Wachbataillon.

== Equipment ==
For reasons of tradition the Wachbataillon is the only unit of the Bundeswehr still using the Karabiner 98k bolt action rifle because the traditional Prussian rifle drills can be executed better with that historical weapon. In 1995 remaining swastikas and other Nazi-era markings were removed from these rifles, after criticism regarding the presence of such symbols on Wachbataillon kit by the SPD parliamentary party. As of 29 October 2011 women are allowed to participate in the drill training with the Karabiner 98k.

During normal duty the Wachbattalion uses the Heckler & Koch G36 assault rifle and other kit like the other units of the Bundeswehr. Since 2006 the 1./WachBtl BMVg is the last unit in the Bundeswehr using ten Feldhaubitze 105 mm guns in the role of salute guns.

== Tradition ==
The Wachbataillon has been granted exemption of the Traditionserlass and is thus continuing the traditions of the 1st Foot Guards and the Infantry Regiment 9 Potsdam, the only unit in the Bundeswehr to officially have such ties. Veterans of these regiments are joined with active and former members of the Wachbataillon in the Semper Talis Union.

== Structure ==
The Wachbataillon is stationed at the Julius Leber Barracks in the centre of Berlin. Since 2001 the Wachbataillon is part of the Streitkräftebasis. The battalion is organized into seven active companies (four of them honour guard companies) and two inactive military reserve companies.

=== List of Wachbataillon's companies ===
Company	Duty of company	Arm
1./WachBtl BMVg	Staff and supply company	Army
2./WachBtl BMVg	Protocol and security company	Army: Jägertruppe
3./WachBtl BMVg	Protocol and security company	Army: Jägertruppe
4./WachBtl BMVg	Protocol and security company	Navy
5./WachBtl BMVg	Protocol and security company	Air Force
6./WachBtl BMVg	Security company	Army: Jägertruppe
7./WachBtl BMVg	Military training company	Army: Jägertruppe
8./WachBtl BMVg	Security company (inactive)	Army: Jägertruppe non-commissioned personnel
9./WachBtl BMVg	Security company (inactive)	Army: Jägertruppe non-commissioned personnel

== See also ==
- Beijing Garrison Honor Guard Battalion, China
- Cuirassiers Regiment, Italy
- Kremlin Regiment, Russia
- Republican Guard, France
- Representative Regiment of the Polish Armed Forces, Poland
- Friedrich Engels Guard Regiment, East Germany
- SS-Verfügungstruppe, Nazi Germany
