= Friedrich Engels Guard Regiment =

East German military unit

- Wachregiment „Friedrich Engels“
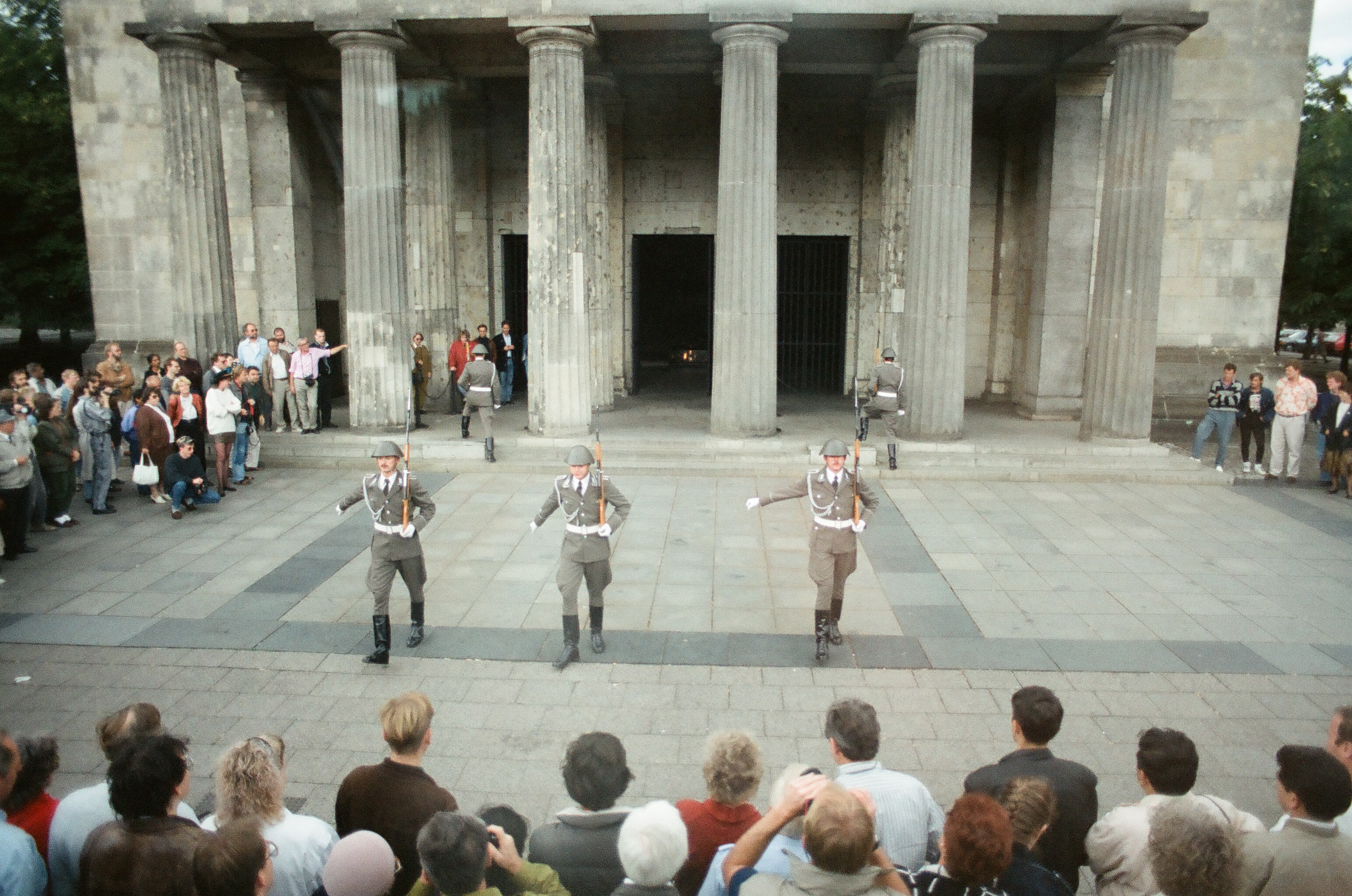
- Friedrich Engels Guard Regiment changing of the guard (1990)
- Active: 1962 to October 2, 1990
- Country: East Germany
- Allegiance: Ministry of National Defence
- Branch: National People's Army
- Type: Infantry
- Role: Drill, ceremonial and guarding and security duties
- Size: 7 active companies
- Part of: Land Forces of the National People's Army; Commandant of the Soviet Sector of Berlin
- Garrison/HQ: Friedrich Engels Barracks, East Berlin
- Nickname: NVA Guard Regiment 1
- March: Präsentiermarsch der Nationalen Volksarmee (slow); Parademarsch № 1 der Nationalen Volksarmee (quick)

Insignia
- Regimental Colors

The Friedrich Engels Guards Regiment (German: Wachregiment „Friedrich Engels“; also known as NVA Guard Regiment 1) was a special guard unit of the Land Forces of the National People's Army. The regiment was named after Friedrich Engels, the German socialist that collaborated with Karl Marx in systematizing Marxism.

== Mission ==
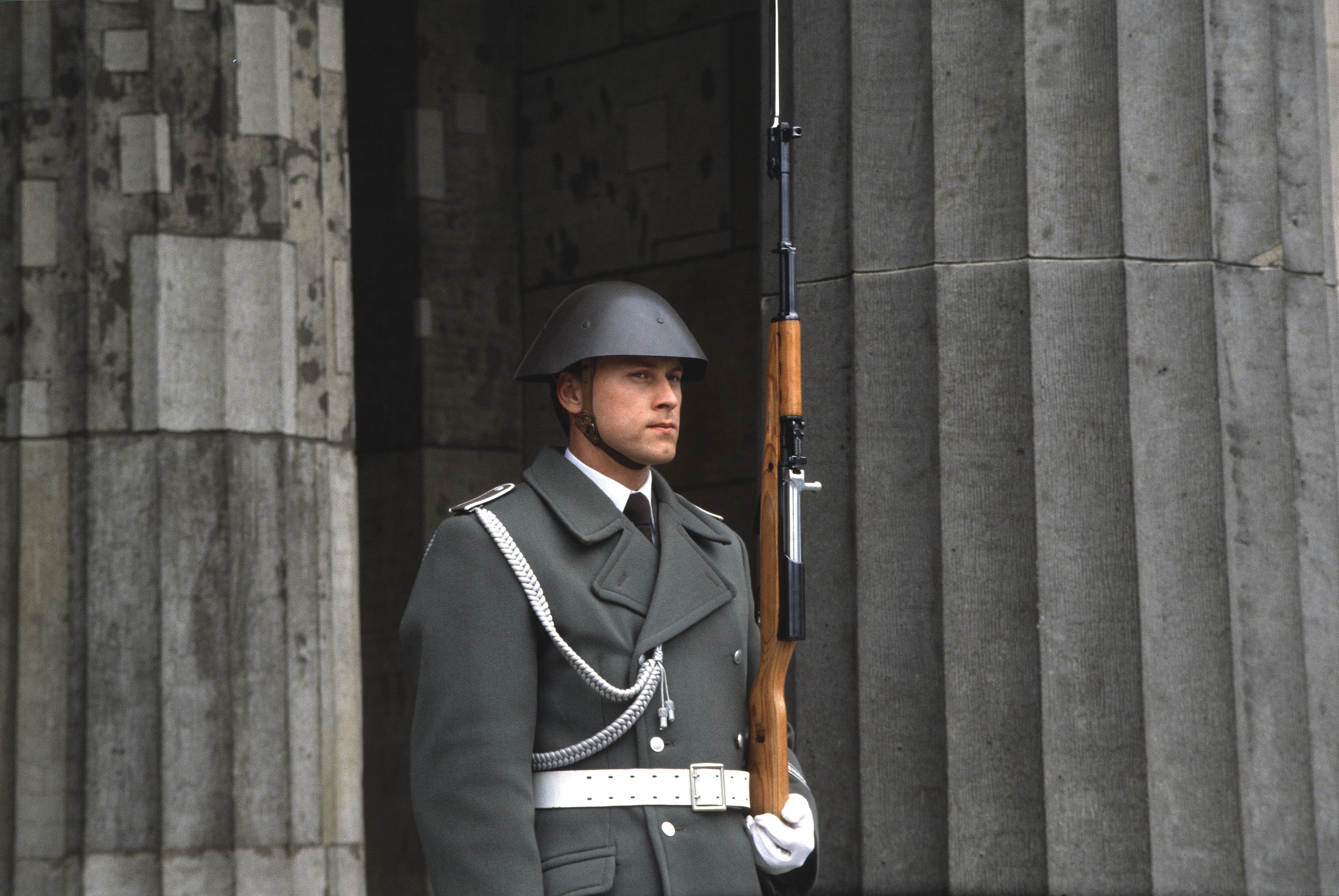
A member of the regiment in a winter greatcoat (April 1989)

It served representative purposes and for surveillance of various landmarks in NVA East Berlin, including the City headquarters, the office of the Ministry of National Defense of the GDR in East Berlin, and the branch office of the Administration of MND Intelligence in Berlin-Köpenick.

The regiment's headquarters was with the patrol commander of the town in Friedrich-Engels-Kaserne, Am Kupfergraben 1 stationed in Berlin. It had seven companies, most of which were made up of conscripts.

Three companies were honor guard companies for the protocol service, the honor guard at the "Memorial to the Victims of Fascism and Militarism" in the Neue Wache and the Great Wachaufzug held weekly on Wednesday at 14:30 was the Guards Parade.

Four companies were guard companies, one of which consisted of reservists.

== History ==
The guard regiment was formed by order No. 99/62 of the Minister of National Defense, Army General Heinz Hoffmann. Its duties were guard duty, guard of honor, honor parade (Ehrenparade), and implementation of the military ceremony.

The guard regiment was established in 1962 from parts of the Hugo Eberlein Guards Regiment but wasn't given the title "Friedrich Engels" until 1970. As only Allied troops could be stationed in Berlin due to the special status of the city, the regiment was formally subordinate to the garrison commander.

The main tasks were the ceremonial presentation of the honor guard at the memorial on Unter den Linden (New Guard) and the Greater Changing of the Guard held every Wednesday and was always quite a spectacle. In addition, the honor companies as formations honor to welcome state guests from the GDR were used. Special duties by the regiment were also performed at the Great Tattoo, other guards of honor, honor companies at funerals of senior figures and wreath-laying ceremonies.

The soldiers of the guard regiment "Friedrich Engels" were generally conscripts who served for 18 months. The presentation weapon was the SKS rifle - in the army under the name "S carabiner led". Each soldier of honor companies had two carbines, a training and a performance carbine. The honor guard at the Unter den Linden was equipped with their own rifles whose bolt and bayonet were chromed.

The Regiment was dissolved along with the rest of the NVA in 1990.

With the dissolution of the National People's Army (NVA) in 1990, the Bundeswehr Command East became its legal successor. The barracks in the historical center of Berlin were converted and, under the name Museumshöfe (Museum Courtyards), are part of the Museum Island complex. Since 2018, the Pergamon Panorama of the National Museums in Berlin has also been located here .

== Commanders ==
name	rank	time
? Pagel	Lieutenant Colonel	1963–1971
? Wölke	Lieutenant Colonel	1971–1983
? Gierth	Colonel	1983–1984
? Otto	Colonel	1984–1989
? Franke	Lieutenant Colonel	1989–1990

== Uniforms ==
Its uniforms were nearly identical to those of those of National People's Army (NVA) and were distinguished primarily by the honorary cuffband (Ärmelstreife) on the left sleeve bearing the regiment's name.

== Gallery ==
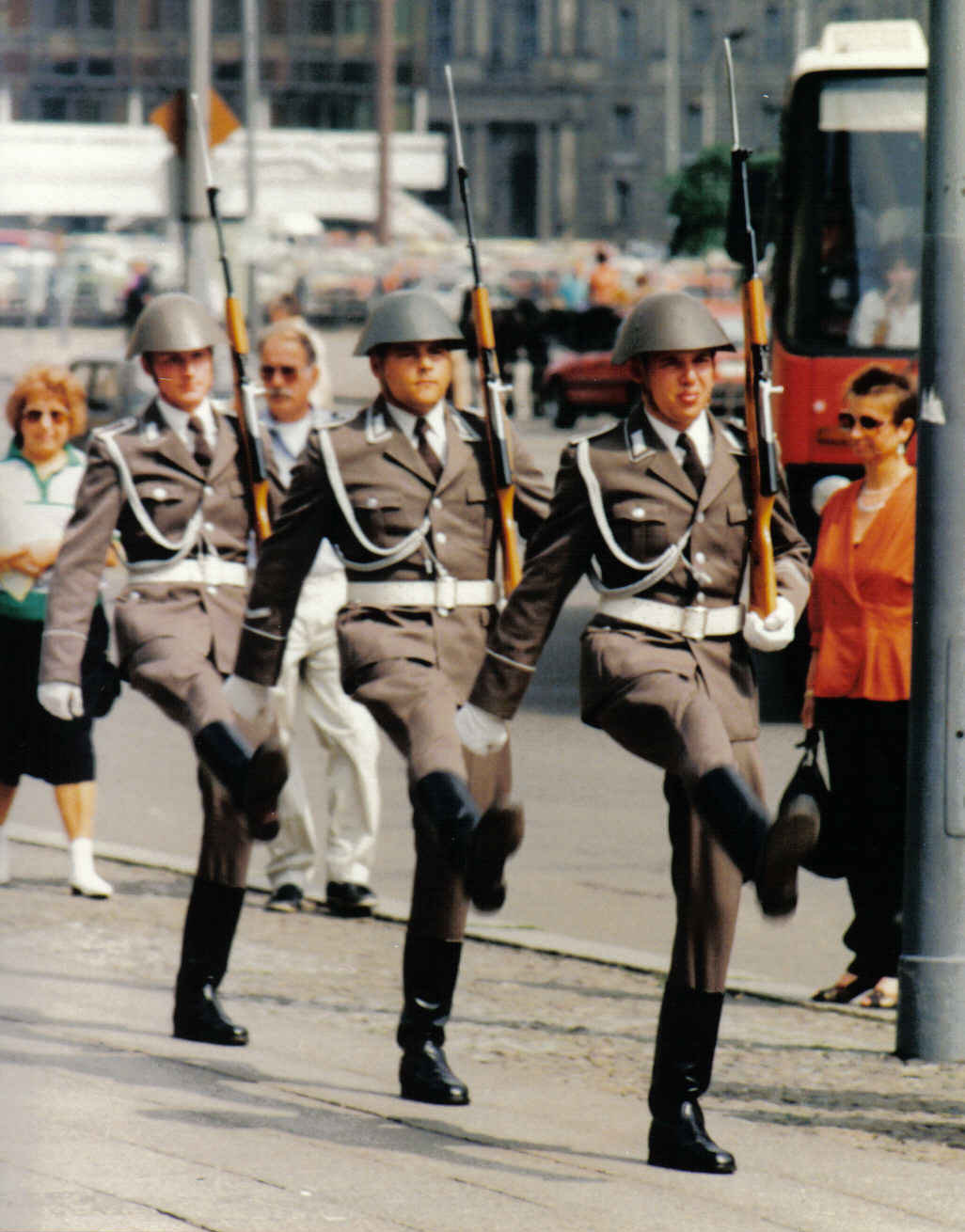
Honor parade of the NVA in front of the "Neue Wache" in Berlin on "Unter den Linden" in 1990

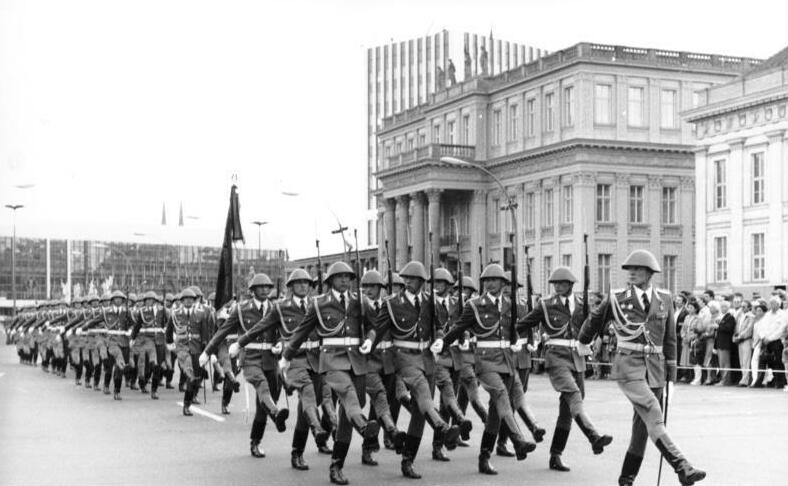
The NVA's "Great Wachaufzug" during the celebrations for the "40th Anniversary of victory and liberation from Hitler-fascism" in 1985

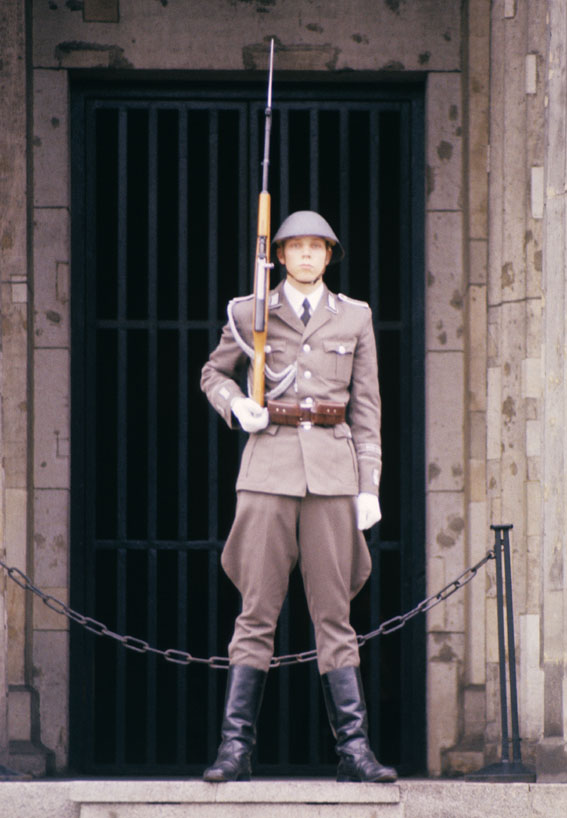
Soldier of the NVA's guard of honor in 1977

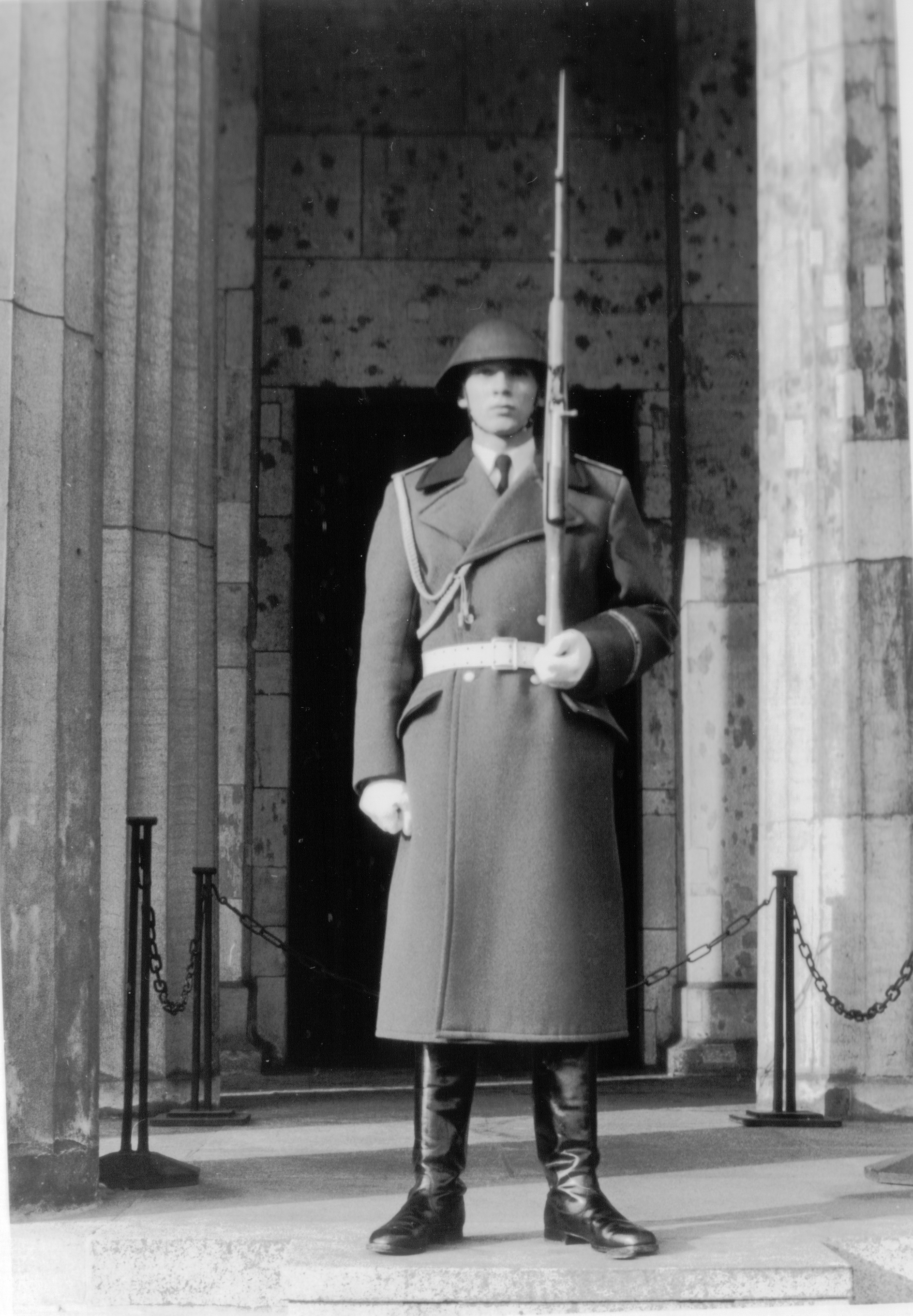
Soldier of the NVA's guard of honor in 1986, winter uniform

== See also ==
- Wachbataillon – the West German equivalent
- Guard Regiment Hugo Eberlein – The guard unit of the GDR MinDef
- Felix Dzerzhinsky Guards Regiment – The Guard unit of the MfS
