= Military Music Center of the Bundeswehr =

Coordinates: 50.7070°N 7.1386°E

- Zentrum Militärmusik der Bundeswehr
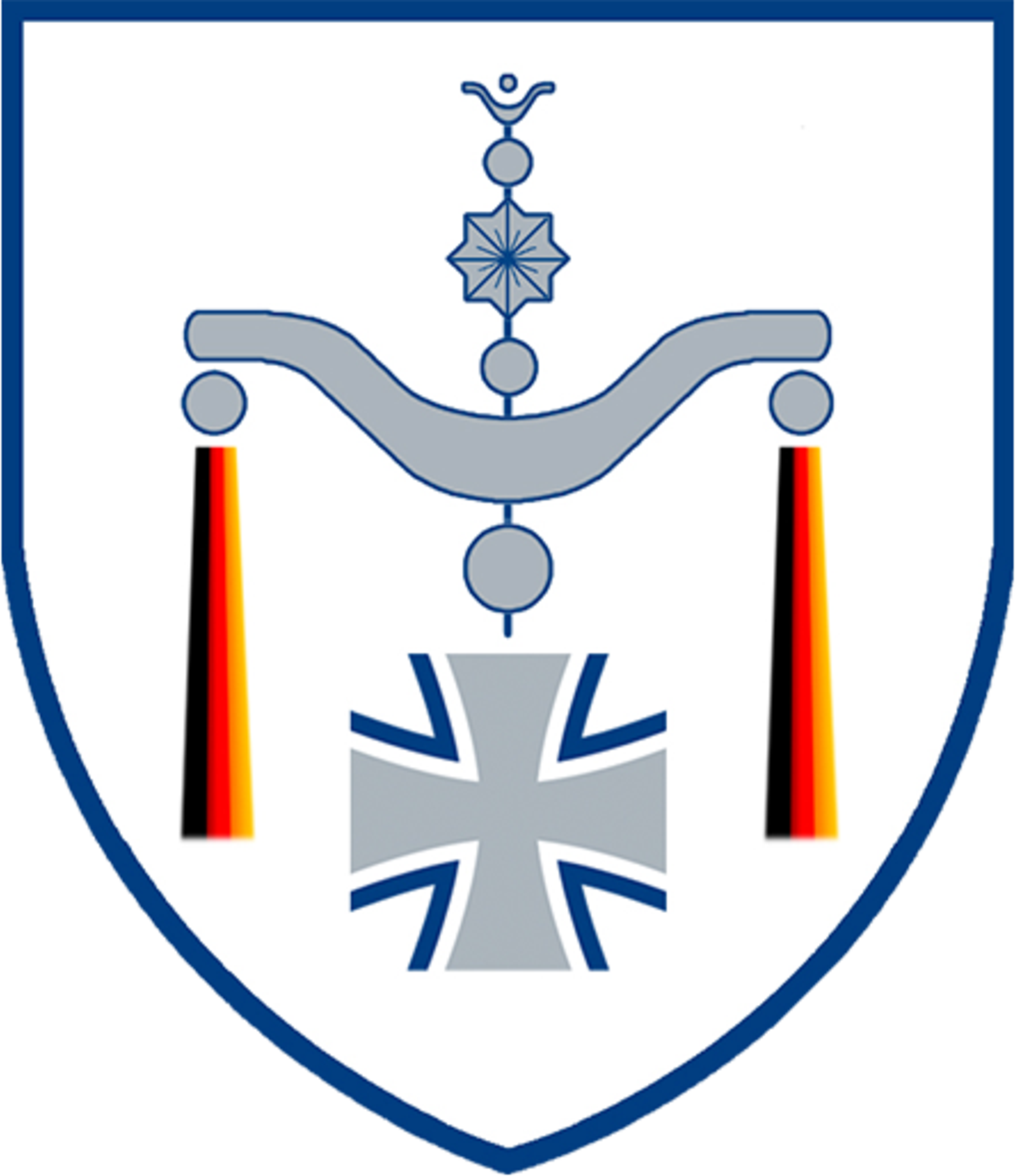
- Insignia
- Founded: 25 August 2009
- Country: Germany
- Branch: Streitkräftebasis
- Type: Command
- Role: Military music
- Size: 30 personnel
- Part of: Streitkräfteamt
- Location website: Bonn

Commanders
- Current commander: Colonel Thomas Klinkhammer
- Deputy Commander: Lt Col Christoph Scheibling

The Military Music Center of the Bundeswehr (German: Zentrum Militärmusik der Bundeswehr, ZMilMusBw) is the office in charge of managing the military bands of the Bundeswehr. It was established on 25 August 2009 as part of a restructuring of the Bundeswehr, to replace the specialist branch of service that existed for military musicians before it.

== Function ==
The Central Task of The Center is the functional management of all music Ensembles of the Bundeswehr as well as professional advisement of the Ministry of Defence (MoD) in Military Music affairs. In addition, it controls and plans the operations of all music units in the Bundeswehr, both domestically and abroad. It is also responsible for the approval of music productions by Members of the Armed Forces.

== Organization ==
- Bundeswehr Military Music Center, in Bonn
  - Bundeswehr Staff Band (Stabsmusikkorps der Bundeswehr), in Berlin
  - Bundeswehr Band (Musikkorps der Bundeswehr), in Siegburg
  - Bundeswehr Big Band (Big Band der Bundeswehr), in Euskirchen
  - Bundeswehr Mountain Band (Gebirgsmusikkorps der Bundeswehr), in Garmisch-Partenkirchen
  - Army Band Hannover (Heeresmusikkorps Hannover), in Hanover
  - Army Band Kassel (Heeresmusikkorps Kassel), in Kassel
  - Army Band Koblenz (Heeresmusikkorps Koblenz), in Koblenz
  - Army Band Neubrandenburg (Heeresmusikkorps Neubrandenburg), in Neubrandenburg
  - Army Band Ulm (Heeresmusikkorps Ulm), in Ulm
  - Army Band Veitshöchheim (Heeresmusikkorps Veitshöchheim), in Veitshöchheim
  - Air Force Band Münster (Luftwaffenmusikkorps Münster), in Münster
  - Air Force Band Erfurt (Luftwaffenmusikkorps Erfurt), in Erfurt
  - Navy Band Kiel (Marinemusikkorps Kiel), in Kiel
  - Navy Band Wilhelmshaven (Marinemusikkorps Wilhelmshaven), in Wilhelmshaven
  - Bundeswehr Training Band (Ausbildungsmusikkorps der Bundeswehr), in Hilden
