= Kalisch Review =

1835 military manoeuvres in modern-day Poland

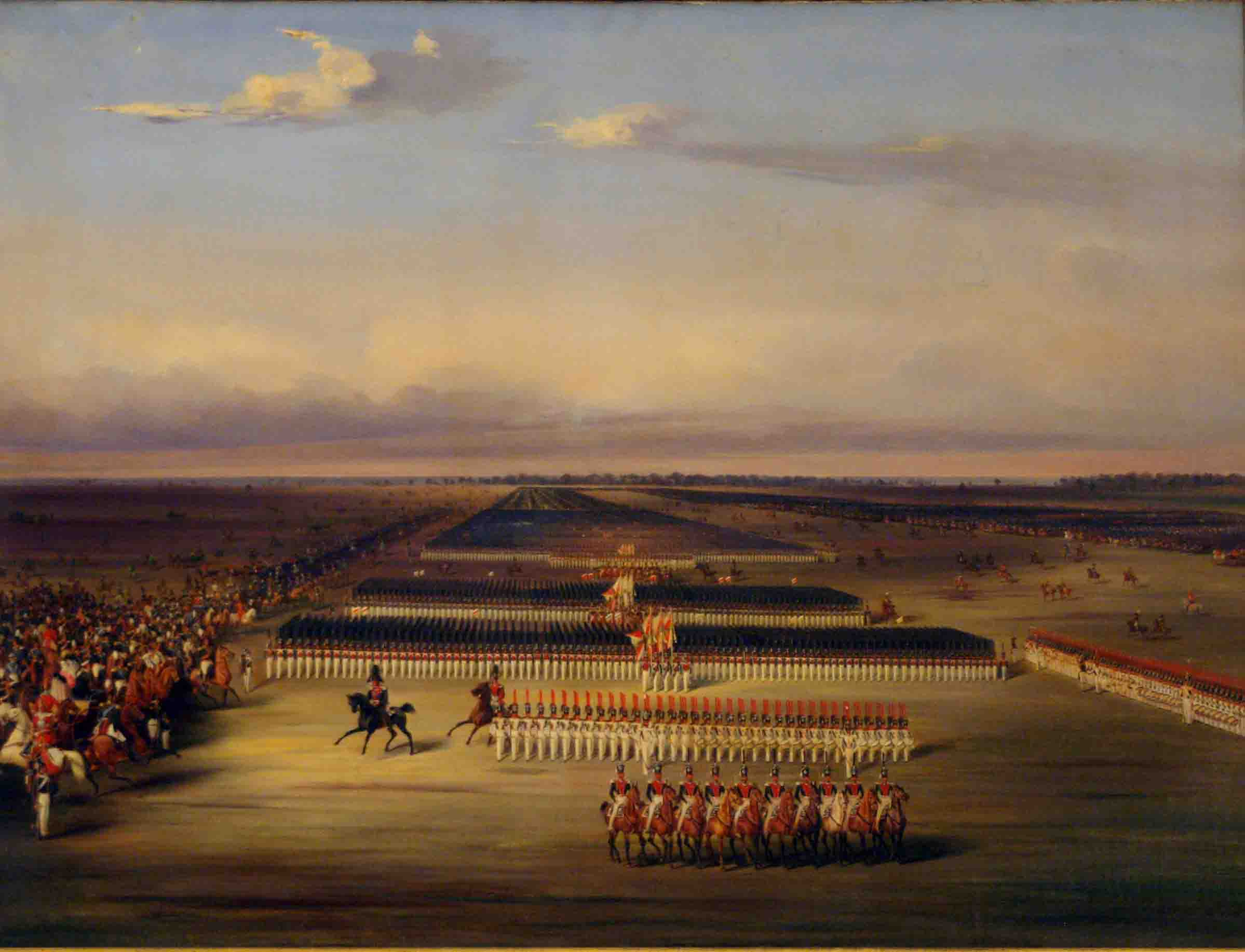
The Prussian troops' arrival at Kalisch

The Kalisch Review was a set of military manoeuvres held at Kalisz (then in the Congress of Poland) from 12 to 22 September 1835. It included the Prussian Army and the Russian Imperial Army. Its motto was "Aus inniger Vereinigung entsteht wirkliche Kraft" (From intimate union arises real power). 60,000 troops, over 7,000 horses and over 136 artillery-pieces were involved. This included over 4,500 Prussian soldiers.

In the aftermath of the November Uprising of 1830-31, the two countries felt they needed to make a major public display to the rest of Europe of their continuing close political ties. Kalisch was chosen due to its links with the 1813 Treaty of Kalisch between the two countries, which paved the way for the joint Prussian-Russian pursuit of Napoleon as he retreated from Moscow. It involved both countries' officers practising manoeuvres at army and corps level, though it did not include mock-battles. Specialist troops from both sides also demonstrated their skills, most notably Cossack and Circassian horsemen. The Prussians were commanded by the future William I and the supreme commander of the Review was Nicholas I of Russia.

The high-point of the review was on 18 September, with over 2,000 military musicians performing a concert, including the premiere of the previously-lost Preussischer Präsentiermarsch written by Frederick William III of Prussia when he was only ten - it was later adopted as a presentation-march by most of the Prussian regiments and is still played by Germany's Bundeswehr. The Review concluded with a huge firework display, costing 100,000 Taler and involving 45,000 rockets and 12,000 pounds of gunpowder - the largest rockets were three-pounders.
