= Treaty of Kalisz =

Treaty of Kalisz may refer to

- Treaty of Kalisz (1343), between the Teutonic Knights and Poland
- Treaty of Kalisz (1813), between Prussia and Russia against Napoleonic France
