= GMK =

GMK may refer to:

- Godzilla, Mothra and King Ghidorah: Giant Monsters All-Out Attack, a 2001 kaiju film abbreviated as “GMK”
- Good Morning Kuya, a Philippine morning news-talk program
- GMK (producer), Nigerian record producer
- Gud Morning Kapatid, a Philippine morning TV show
- Guido Maria Kretschmer (born 1965), German fashion designer and television personality
- Mountain Band of the Bundeswehr (or GebMusKorpsB, or GMK), a German military band
- GM Korea, a South Korean automobile manufacturer
- GMK Boulevard, a street in Mersin, Turkey
