= Military bands of the Bundeswehr =

Special service of the Bundeswehr

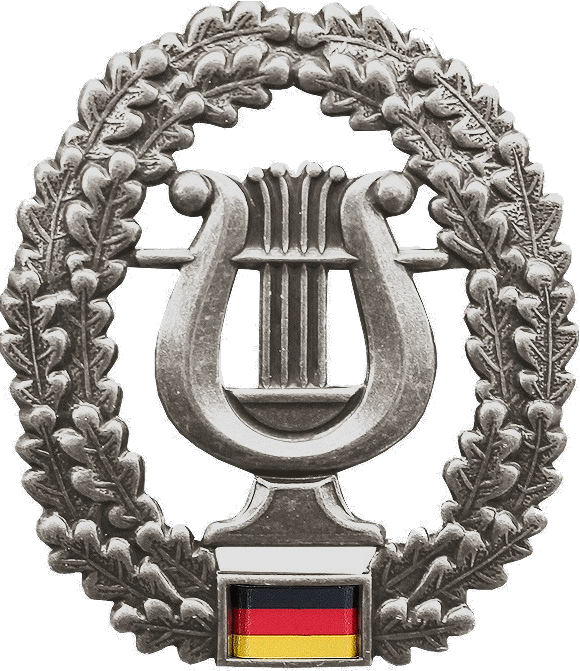
The beret badge of Bundeswehr military musicians

There are 15 military bands of the Bundeswehr, including those of the German Army, Air Force, Navy, and joint bands. Before 2009, the military musicians of the Bundeswehr constituted a joint specialist service, the Military Music Service (German: Militärmusikdienst), subordinate to the Armed Forces Office (German: Streitkräfteamt). In 2009, as part of a larger reorganisation of the Bundeswehr, the organization of the Military Music Service was replaced by the new Military Music Center of the Bundeswehr (German: Zentrum Militärmusik der Bundeswehr) in Bonn, and several bands were disbanded. The bands of the Bundeswehr provide music for official ceremonies such as the Großer Zapfenstreich and the swearing-in of new recruits. In addition to their traditional military music repertoire, they perform concert band and light music, as well as genres such as jazz, rock, and pop.

== Structure ==
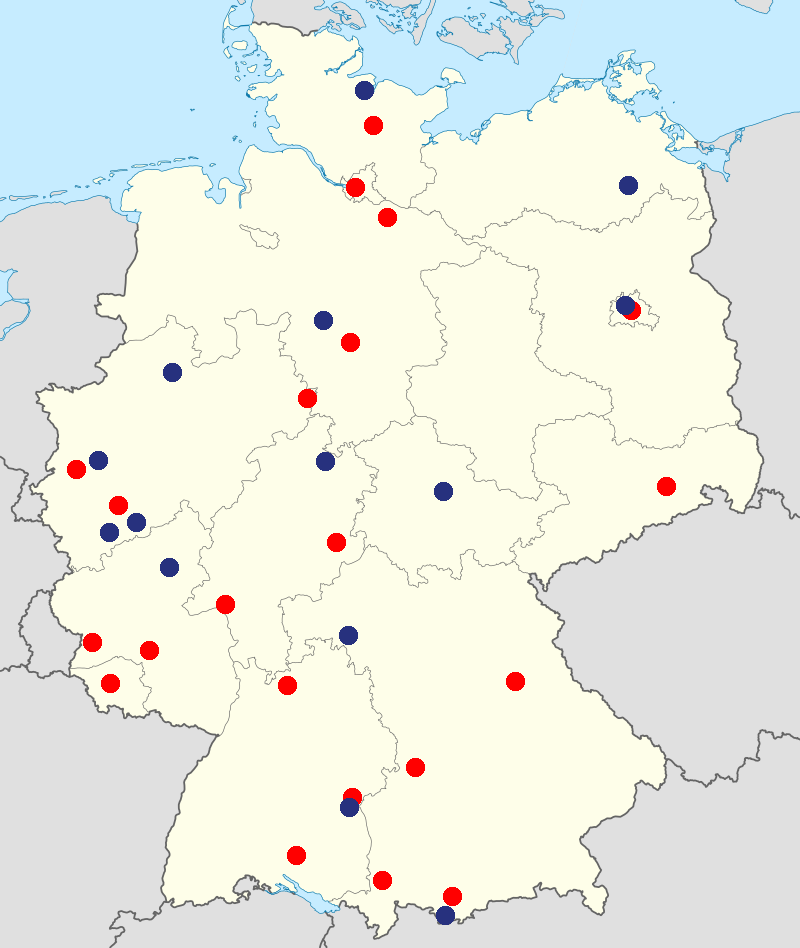
A map of German military bands across the country.

The professional management of all the military bands of the Bundeswehr lies with the director of the Military Music Center of the Bundeswehr. Since 2016, Colonel Christoph Lieder has held this position. The individual bands may be subject to military divisions or regional commands as well.

=== Joint bands ===
There are four joint service bands in the Bundeswehr that are part of the Armed Forces Office, a component of the Joint Support Service. There also are two bands associated with military districts, which used to be Army bands. Although these bands primarily use German Army uniforms, they are not officially subordinate to the Army.

Insignia	Name	Location	Date established	Notes
	Staff Band of the Bundeswehr; Stabsmusikkorps der Bundeswehr	Berlin	1 April 1991	Part of the Berlin Garrison Command, responsible for protocol in Berlin
	Bonn Band of the Bundeswehr; Musikkorps der Bundeswehr	Siegburg	16 February 1957	Tours within Germany and internationally, and responsible for protocol in the Bonn area
	Big Band of the Bundeswehr; Big Band der Bundeswehr	Euskirchen	29 March 1971	Big band ensemble
	Training Band of the Bundeswehr; Ausbildungsmusikkorps der Bundeswehr	Hilden	1999	Responsible for training new musicians; planned to be moved to Düsseldorf
	Army Band Neubrandenburg; Heeresmusikkorps Neubrandenburg	Neubrandenburg	1 April 1991	Established as Army Band 80, later Army Band 14, and Military District Band I
	Mountain Band of the Bundeswehr; Gebirgsmusikkorps der Bundeswehr	Garmisch-Partenkirchen	1 July 1956	Established as the band of the 1st Mountain Division, now associated with Military District IV

=== Army ===
Insignia	Name	Location	Date established	Notes
	Army Band Hannover; Heeresmusikkorps Hannover	Hannover	1 July 1956	Established as Musikkorps II A, later Army Band 1; associated with the 1st Panzer Division
	Army Band Kassel; Heeresmusikkorps Kassel	Kassel	1 July 1956	Established as Musikkorps IV A, later Army Band 2
	Army Band Koblenz; Heeresmusikkorps Koblenz	Koblenz	1 July 1956	Established as Musikkorps IV B, later Army Band 300
	Army Band Veitshöchheim; Heeresmusikkorps Veitshöchheim	Veitshöchheim	1 May 1962	Formed as Air Force Band 5, later Army Band 13, and Army Band 12
	Army Band Ulm; Heeresmusikkorps Ulm	Ulm	1 July 1956	Established as Musikkorps V B, later Army Band 10

In addition to the professional Army bands, there are several amateur marching bands made up of reservists.

=== Air Force ===
Insignia	Name	Location	Date established	Notes
	Air Force Band Münster; Luftwaffenmusikkorps Münster	Münster	11 July 1956	Established as Air Force Band 1, later Air Force Band 3; in March 2014 the other three air force bands were merged with it
	Air Force Band Erfurt; Luftwaffenmusikkorps Erfurt	Erfurt	15 March 1991	Established as Army Band 70, later Military District Band III

=== Navy ===
Insignia	Name	Location	Date established	Notes
	Navy Band Kiel; Marinemusikkorps Kiel	Kiel	1956	Previously Navy Band Baltic Sea, before it was merged with Navy Band North Sea in March 2014
	Navy Band Wilhelmshaven; Marinemusikkorps Wilhelmshaven	Wilhelmshaven	2019	It was officially established in October 2019 as the direct successor to Navy Band North Sea, which was disestablished in March 2014.

== History ==
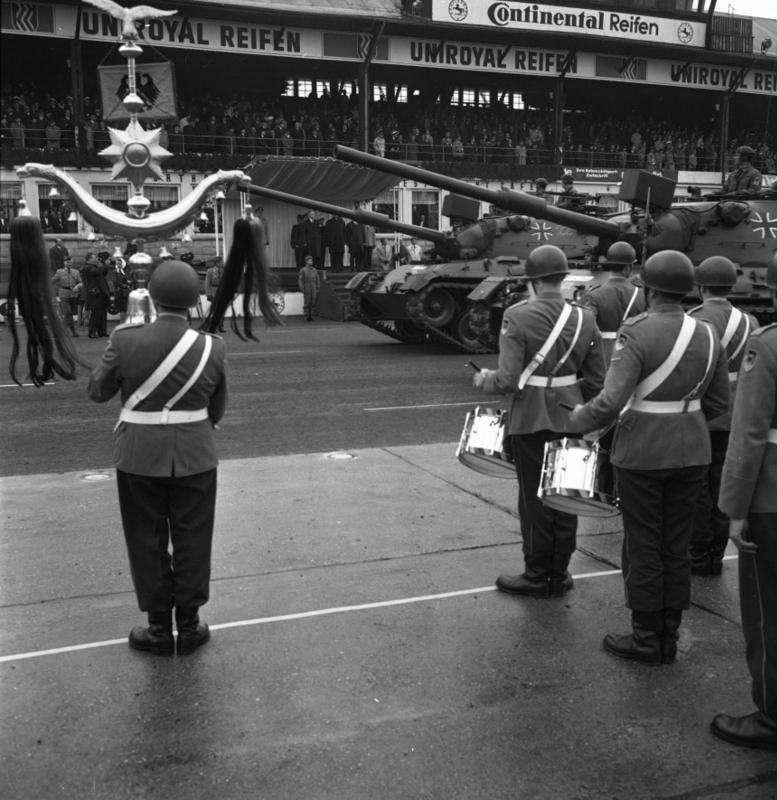
A Bundeswehr band during a parade in 1969 celebrating 20 years of NATO

While the formation of the Bundeswehr was being prepared in the 1950s, then-Chancellor Konrad Adenauer is said to have placed great importance on the formation of military bands. He demanded at least one band be formed during the Bundeswehr's first year of existence; and, indeed, six bands were formed. The first band of the Bundeswehr was established on 2 January 1956, Musikkorps III A in Andernach (later Army Band 7). The bands of the Bundeswehr have gone through many phases of reduction, growth and change since then. For some time each Army division had its own band (some of these bands, like the Gebirgsmusikkorps, survive today in some form), and the Navy and Air Force have had more than their current two bands for most of their history. These serve as the link of the armed forces to the long years of the German military music tradition.

As a general rule the Armeemarschsammlung forms part of the band repertory music, which include ceremonial marches for parades.

== Personnel ==
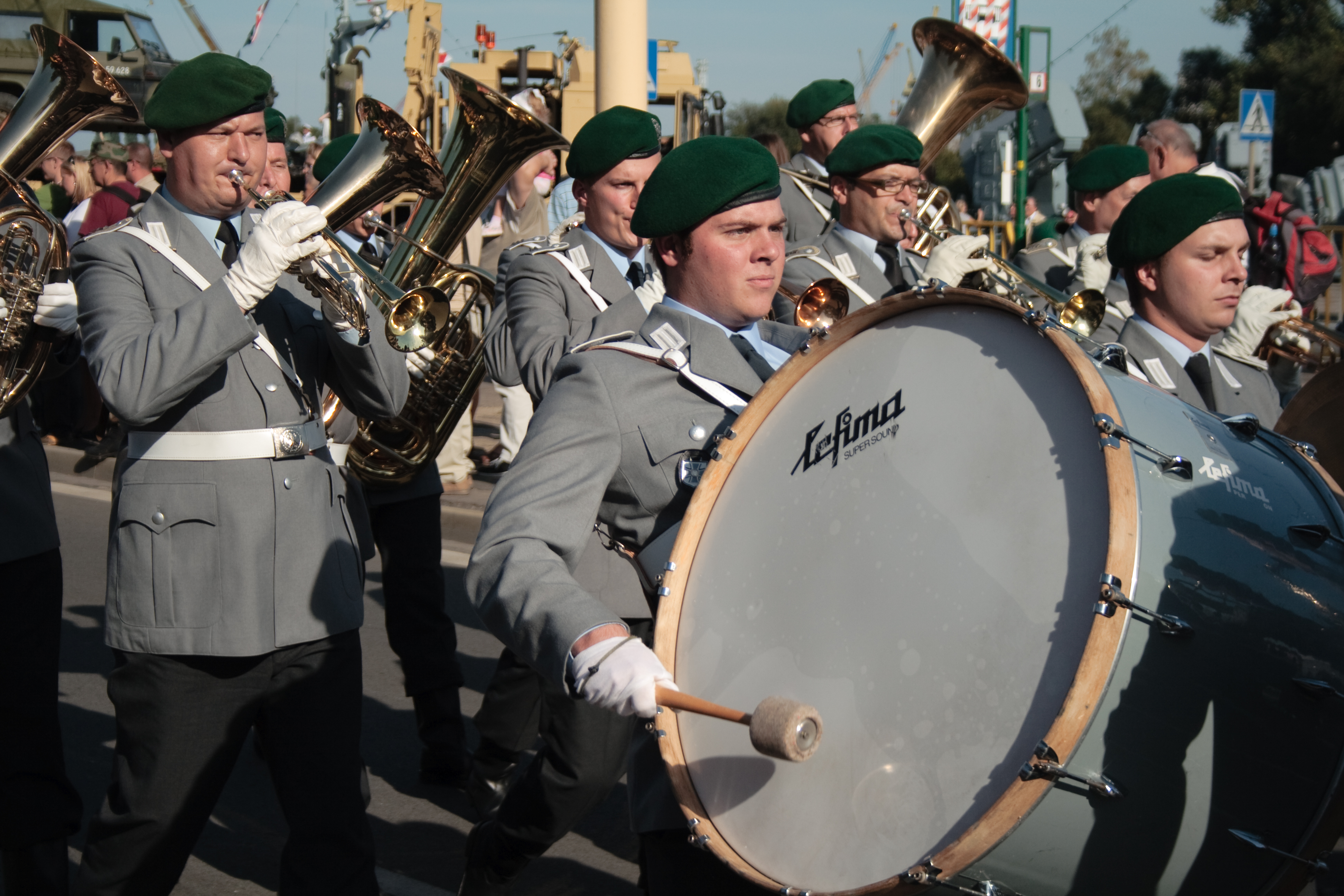
Musicians of the Staff Band of the Bundeswehr

The enlisted personnel of Bundeswehr bands are drawn from those who initially volunteer for two years of service in the Bundeswehr (and formerly conscripts). Unteroffiziere (junior NCOs) used to be allowed to enlist for a minimum of four years. Feldwebel (senior NCOs) enlist for a minimum of twelve years of service, including a four-year undergraduate degree in music at the Robert Schumann Hochschule. Commissioned officers earn a Diplom degree as Kapellmeisters and commit to a minimum of fifteen years of service. Senior NCOs and commissioned officers go through their advanced training as members of the Training Band of the Bundeswehr.

In the case of war, military musicians will serve in the Joint Medical Service. In addition to musical training, every musician receives some form of medical training, including study at the Medical Academy of the Bundeswehr (German: Sanitätsakademie der Bundeswehr) for senior personnel.
