= Convention of Tauroggen =

1812 armistice between Prussia and Russia

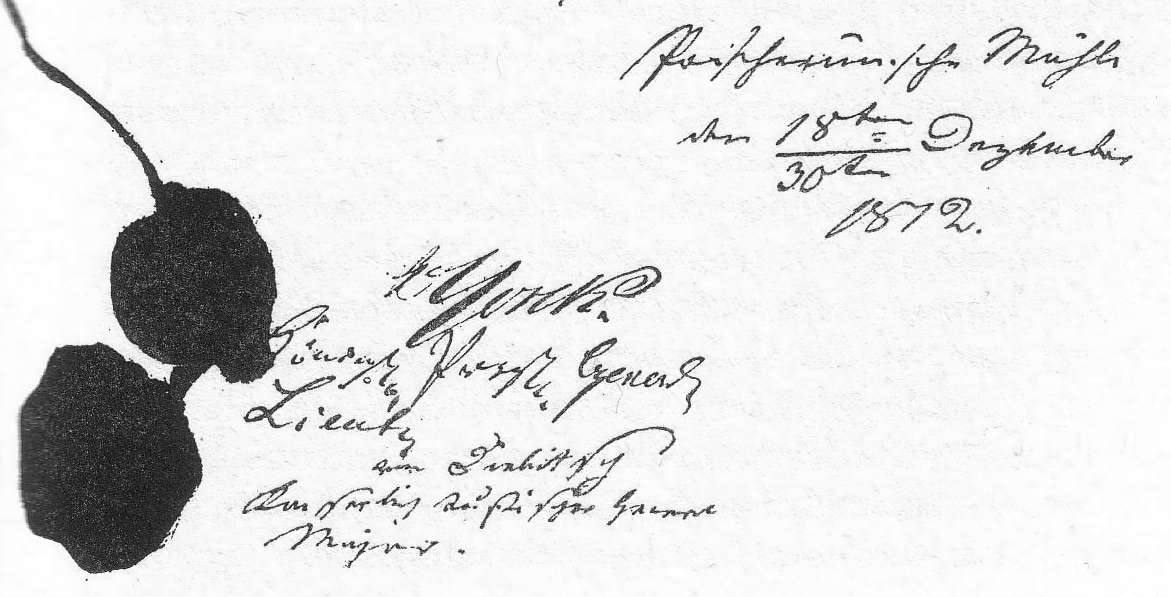
Signatures of General Ludwig Yorck and General Hans Karl von Diebitsch under the Tauroggen Convention of 30 December 1812

The Convention of Tauroggen was an armistice signed 30 December 1812 at Tauragė (now Lithuania) between General Ludwig Yorck on behalf of his Prussian troops and General Hans Karl von Diebitsch of the Imperial Russian Army. Yorck's act is traditionally considered a turning point of Prussian history, triggering an insurgency against Napoleon in the Rheinbund. At the time of the armistice, Tauroggen was situated in the Russian Empire, 40 kilometres (25 mi) east of the Prussian border.

== Background ==
According to the Treaty of Paris, French-occupied Prussia had to support Napoleon's invasion of Russia by lending him an army corps. This resulted in some Prussian officers leaving their army to avoid serving the French. Among them was Carl von Clausewitz, who then joined the Russian service as a Lieutenant Colonel. Between October and December, Yorck received numerous Russian requests to switch sides. He forwarded these to Berlin, but received no instructions.

When Yorck's immediate French superior, Marshal Étienne Macdonald, retreated from the siege of Riga (1812) before Diebitsch's corps, Yorck found himself isolated and eventually surrounded. As a soldier his duty was to break through, but as a Prussian patriot his position was more difficult. He had to judge whether the moment was favorable for starting a Prussian war of liberation over the cautious King Frederick William III's objections. Whatever might be the enthusiasm of his junior staff-officers, Yorck had no illusions as to the safety of his own head should he miscalculate. Clausewitz, in Russian uniform, passed secretly behind French lines and managed to convince Yorck to negotiate with the Russian high command. While negotiations were ongoing at Tauragė on 26 December, Yorck sent the king's adjutant, Major Wilhelm Henckel von Donnersmarck, back to Berlin via Königsberg, there to inform General Friedrich Wilhelm von Bülow about the impending Russian truce. On 29 December, Donnersmarck told Bülow that Yorck had separated his forces from the French and that an agreement with Russia was at hand. Therefore, the French should be treated as enemies. In fact, the French headquarters were also at Königsberg and the French commander, Joachim Murat, informed Bülow of Yorck's "treason" on 1 January. Later that day a letter arrived by messenger from Yorck himself.

== Terms ==
The Convention of Tauroggen, signed by Diebitsch and Yorck, "neutralized" the Prussian corps without consent of their king. It also left the East Prussian border completely undefended. The news was received with the wildest enthusiasm in Prussia, but the Prussian court dared not yet throw off the mask, and an order was dispatched suspending Yorck from his command pending a court-martial. Diebitsch refused to let the bearer pass through his lines, and the general was finally absolved when the Treaty of Kalisz definitely ranged Prussia on the side of the Allies.

== Aftermath ==
Between 1 January, when Murat moved his headquarters west to Elbing, and 3 January, when Marshal MacDonald, Yorck's superior, arrived in Königsberg, Bülow worked feverishly to move his supplies to Graudenz and about 5,000 men to Kreuzberg, where he arrived on 2 January. On 9 January he retreated west across the Vistula, ceding East Prussia to the retreating French and advancing Russians. On 5 January, Yorck had sent his last messenger to Berlin. On 8 January, he arrived at Königsberg with the Russian general Ludwig Adolf von Wittgenstein. Yorck reaffirmed his commitment to the armistice, but refused Wittgenstein's demand that he fight the French. That day, however, the king's messengers arrived to dismiss Yorck from his command and repudiate his armistice. Yorck refused and in a letter to Bülow on 13 January, he questioned if he had "sunk so deep that he fears to break the chains of slavery, the chains that we have meekly carried for five years?" He declared it "the time to regain our freedom and honour" and protested that he was "a true Prussian".

Yorck was finally absolved when the Treaty of Kalisz, signed on 28 February, placed Prussia on the side of the Allies. His veterans formed the nucleus of the forces of East Prussia, and Yorck himself took the final step in public by declaring war on Napoleon as the commander of those forces. On 17 March 1813, Yorck made his entry into Berlin in the midst of the wildest exuberance of patriotic joy. On the same day, the king declared war on France.

As a result of these developments and the resulting War of the Sixth Coalition, Prussia—which had lost half of its territory and population after its conquest by France 1806–07—was restored as a Great Power and would later go on to found the Second German Empire.

== External sources ==
- rbbonline (2021). "30. Dezember 1812: Tauroggen — Ein Hochverrat wird Fanal nationaler Erhebung" (in German). Archived from the original on 26 September 2007.
- Hentrich, Martin. "Konvention von Tauroggen" (in German).
