= Frederick William III =

King of Prussia from 1797 to 1840

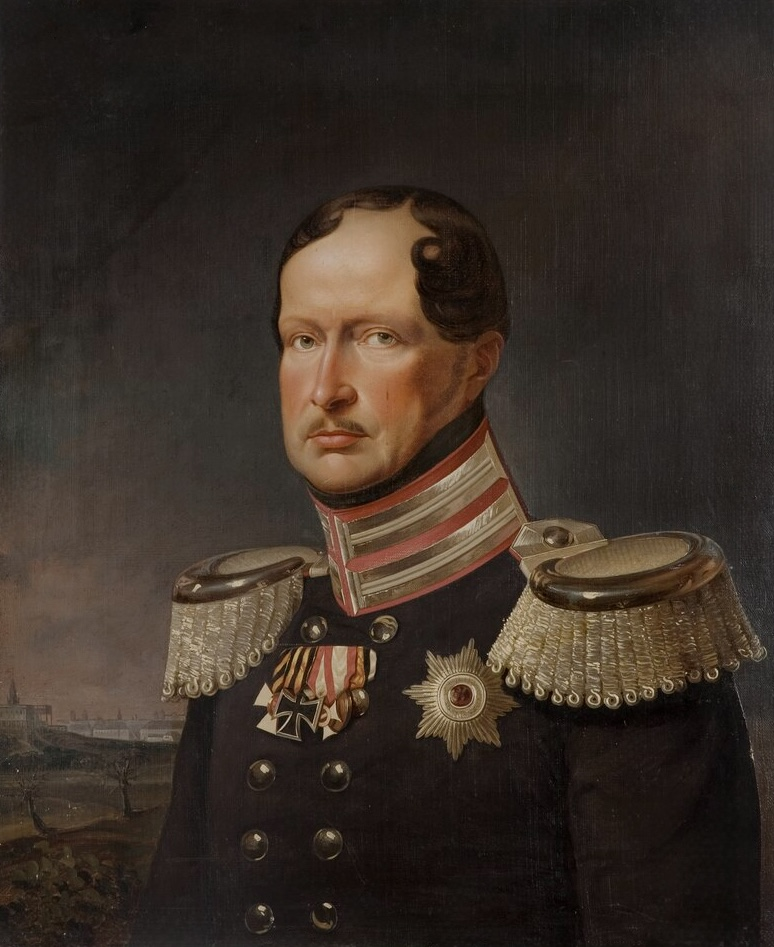
- Portrait of Frederick William III, after an original by Franz Krüger, c. 1830s

King of Prussia
- Reign: 16 November 1797 – 7 June 1840
- Predecessor: Frederick William II
- Successor: Frederick William IV

Elector of Brandenburg
- Reign: 17 November 1797 – 6 August 1806
- Predecessor: Frederick William II
- Successor: Electorate abolished
- Born: 3 August 1770; Potsdam, Prussia, Holy Roman Empire
- Died: 7 June 1840 (aged 69); Berlin, Prussia
- Burial: Mausoleum at Charlottenburg Palace
- Spouses: Louise of Mecklenburg-Strelitz (m. 1793; died 1810) Auguste von Harrach (morganatic) (m. 1824)
- Issue see details...: Frederick William IV, King of Prussia; Wilhelm I, German Emperor; Charlotte, Empress of Russia; Princess Frederica; Prince Charles; Alexandrine, Grand Duchess of Mecklenburg-Schwerin; Prince Ferdinand; Princess Louise of the Netherlands; Prince Albert
- House: Hohenzollern
- Father: Frederick William II of Prussia
- Mother: Frederica Louisa of Hesse-Darmstadt
- Religion: Calvinist (until 1817); Prussian United (after 1817)

Frederick William III (German: Friedrich Wilhelm III.; 3 August 1770 – 7 June 1840) was King of Prussia from 16 November 1797 until his death in 1840. He was concurrently Elector of Brandenburg in the Holy Roman Empire until 6 August 1806, when the empire was dissolved.

Frederick William III ruled Prussia during the times of the Napoleonic Wars. The king reluctantly joined the Sixth Coalition against Napoleon in the German campaign of 1813. Following Napoleon's defeat, he took part in the Congress of Vienna, which assembled to settle the political questions arising from the new, post-Napoleonic order in Europe. His primary interests were internal – the reform of Prussia's Protestant churches. He was determined to unify the Protestant churches to homogenize their liturgy, organization, and architecture. The long-term goal was to have fully centralized royal control of all the Protestant churches in the Prussian Union of Churches.

The king was said to be extremely shy and indecisive. He led a powerful group that included Baron Heinrich Friedrich Karl vom und zum Stein, Prince Karl August von Hardenberg, Gerhard von Scharnhorst, and Count August Neidhardt von Gneisenau. They set about reforming Prussia's administration, churches, finance, and military. He was the dedicatee of Beethoven's Ninth Symphony in 1824.

== Early life ==
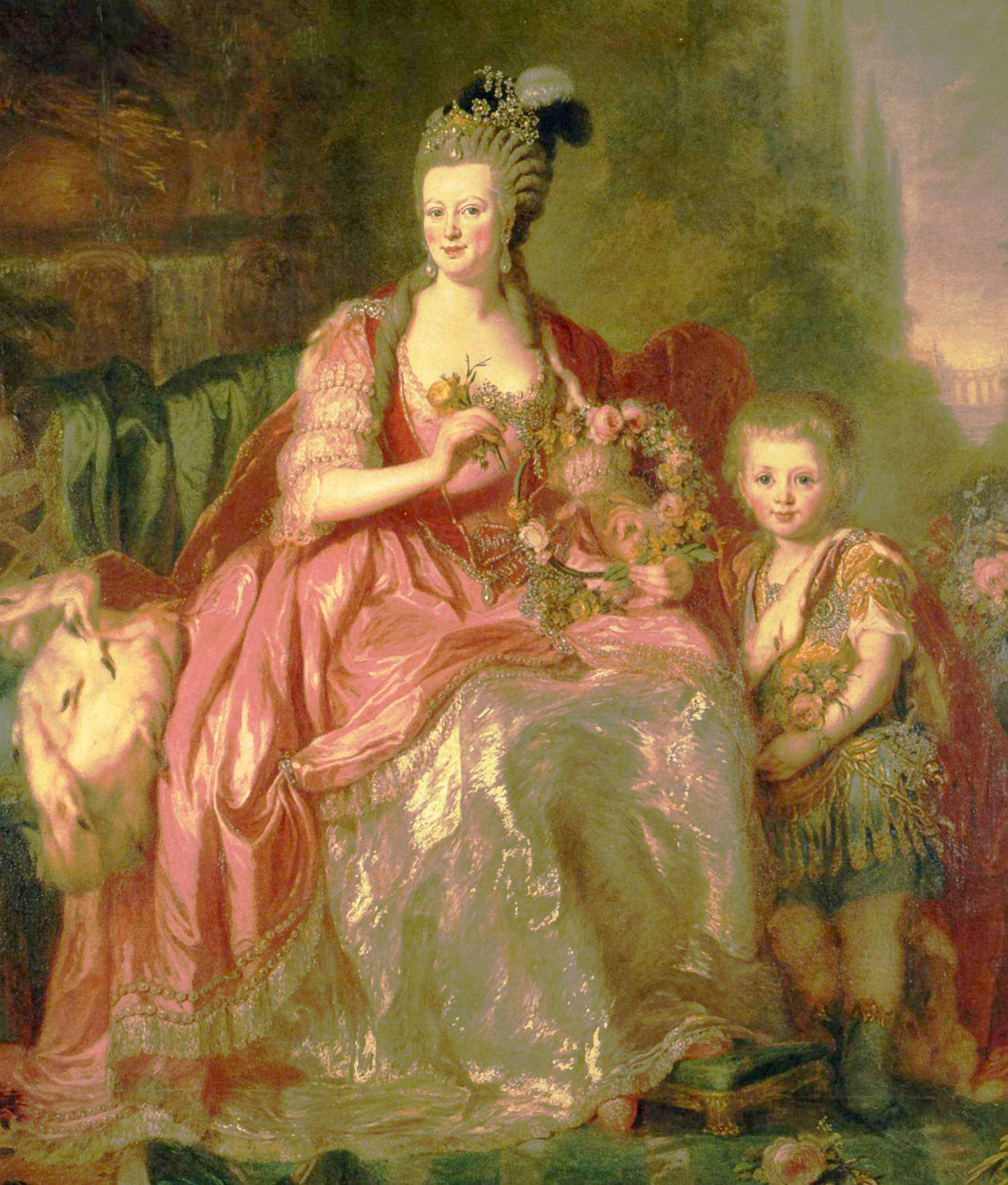
Frederick William and his mother (1775)

Frederick William was born in Potsdam on 3 August 1770 as the son of Frederick William II of Prussia and Frederica Louisa of Hesse-Darmstadt. He was considered to be a shy and reserved boy, which became noticeable in his particularly reticent conversations, distinguished by the lack of personal pronouns. This manner of speech subsequently came to be considered entirely appropriate for military officers. He was neglected by his father during his childhood and suffered from an inferiority complex his entire life.

As a child, Frederick William's father (under the influence of his mistress, Wilhelmine Enke, Countess of Lichtenau) had him handed over to tutors, as was quite normal for the period. He spent part of the time living at Paretz, the estate of the old soldier, Count Hans von Blumenthal, who was a tutor and guardian of his brother, Prince Henry. They thus grew up partly with the count's son, who accompanied them on their Grand Tour in the 1780s. Frederick William was happy at Paretz, and for this reason, in 1795, he bought it from his boyhood friend and turned it into an important royal country retreat. He was a melancholy boy, but he grew up pious and honest. His tutors included the dramatist Johann Jakob Engel.

As a soldier, he received the usual training of a Prussian prince, obtained his lieutenancy in 1784, became a lieutenant colonel in 1786, a colonel in 1790, and took part in the campaigns against France of 1792–1794. On 24 December 1793, Frederick William married Louise of Mecklenburg-Strelitz, with whom he had ten children. In the Kronprinzenpalais (Crown Prince's Palace) in Berlin, Frederick William lived a civil life with a problem-free marriage, which did not change even when he became King of Prussia in 1797. His wife Louise was particularly loved by the people of Prussia, which boosted the popularity of the whole House of Hohenzollern, including the King himself.

== Reign ==
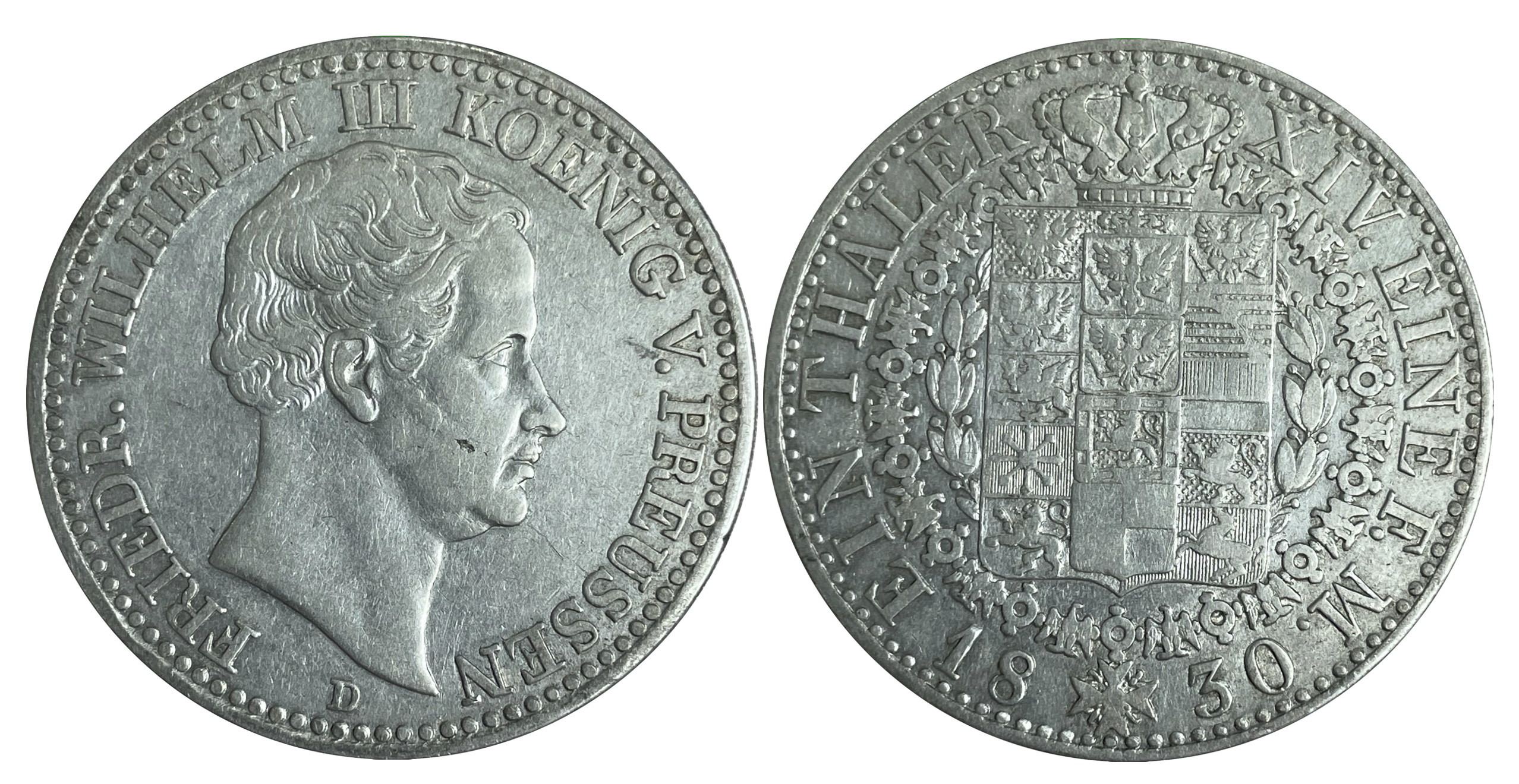
Silver coin: 1 thaler Wilhelm III, 1830

Frederick William succeeded to the throne on 16 November 1797. He also became, in personal union, the sovereign prince of the Principality of Neuchâtel (1797–1806 and again 1814–1840). At once, the new king showed that he was earnest of his good intentions by cutting down the royal establishment's expenses, dismissing his father's ministers, and reforming the most oppressive abuses of the late reign. He had the Hohenzollern determination to retain personal power but not the Hohenzollern genius for using it. Too distrustful to delegate responsibility to his ministers, he greatly reduced the effectiveness of his reign since he was forced to assume the roles he did not delegate. This is the main factor of his inconsistent rule.

Disgusted with his father's court (in both political intrigues and sexual affairs), Frederick William's first and most successful early endeavor was to restore his dynasty's moral legitimacy. The eagerness to restore dignity to his family went so far that it nearly caused sculptor Johann Gottfried Schadow to cancel the expensive and lavish Prinzessinnengruppe project, which was commissioned by the previous monarch Frederick William II. He was quoted as saying the following, which demonstrated his sense of duty and peculiar manner of speech:

Every civil servant has a dual obligation: to the sovereign and the country. It can occur that the two are not compatible; then, the duty to the country is higher.

At first, Frederick William and his advisors attempted to pursue a neutrality policy in the Napoleonic Wars. Although they succeeded in keeping out of the Third Coalition in 1805, eventually, Frederick William was swayed by the queen's attitude, who led Prussia's pro-war party and entered into the war in October 1806. On 14 October 1806, at the Battles of Jena-Auerstädt, the French effectively decimated the Prussian Army's effectiveness and functionality; led by Frederick William, the Prussian army collapsed entirely soon after. Napoleon occupied Berlin in late October. The royal family fled to Memel, East Prussia, where they fell on the mercy of Emperor Alexander I of Russia.

Alexander, too, suffered defeat at the hands of the French, and at Tilsit on the Niemen France made peace with Russia and Prussia. Napoleon dealt with Prussia very harshly, despite the pregnant queen's interview with the French emperor, which was believed to soften the defeat. Instead, Napoleon took much less mercy on the Prussians than what was expected. Prussia lost many of its Polish territories and all territory west of the Elbe and had to finance a large indemnity and pay French troops to occupy key strong points within the kingdom.

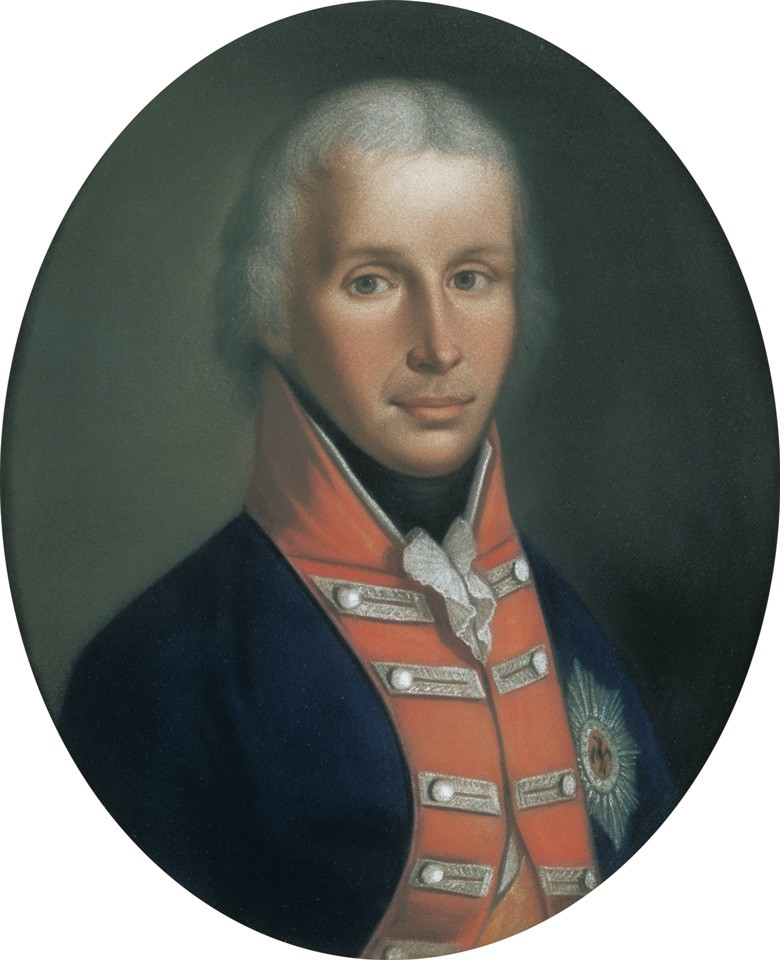
Frederick William III during his early reign, by Nikolaus Lauer, c. 1797–98

Although the ineffectual king himself seemed resigned to Prussia's fate, various reforming ministers, such as Heinrich Friedrich Karl vom und zum Stein, Prince Karl August von Hardenberg, Gerhard Johann David von Scharnhorst, and Count August von Gneisenau, set about reforming Prussia's administration and military, with the encouragement of Queen Louise (who died, greatly mourned, in 1810). After bereavement, Frederick William fell under the influence of a 'substitute family' of courtiers, among whom included Friedrich Ancillon, a Huguenot preacher that provided the king with strong ideological support against political reforms that might restrain monarchical power, Sophie Marie von Voß, an older woman with conservative views and Prince Wilhelm zu Sayn-Wittgenstein-Hohenstein.

In 1813, following Napoleon's defeat in Russia and pressured by the Convention of Tauroggen, Frederick William turned against France and signed an alliance with Russia at Kalisz. However, he had to flee Berlin, still under French occupation. Prussian troops played a crucial part in the victories of the allies in 1813 and 1814, and the king himself traveled with the main army of Karl Philipp Fürst zu Schwarzenberg, along with Alexander of Russia and Francis of Austria.

At the Congress of Vienna, Frederick William's ministers succeeded in securing significant territorial increases for Prussia. However, they failed to obtain the annexation of all of Saxony, as they had wished. Following the war, Frederick William turned towards political reaction, abandoning the promises he had made in 1813 to provide Prussia with a constitution.

=== Prussian Union of Churches ===
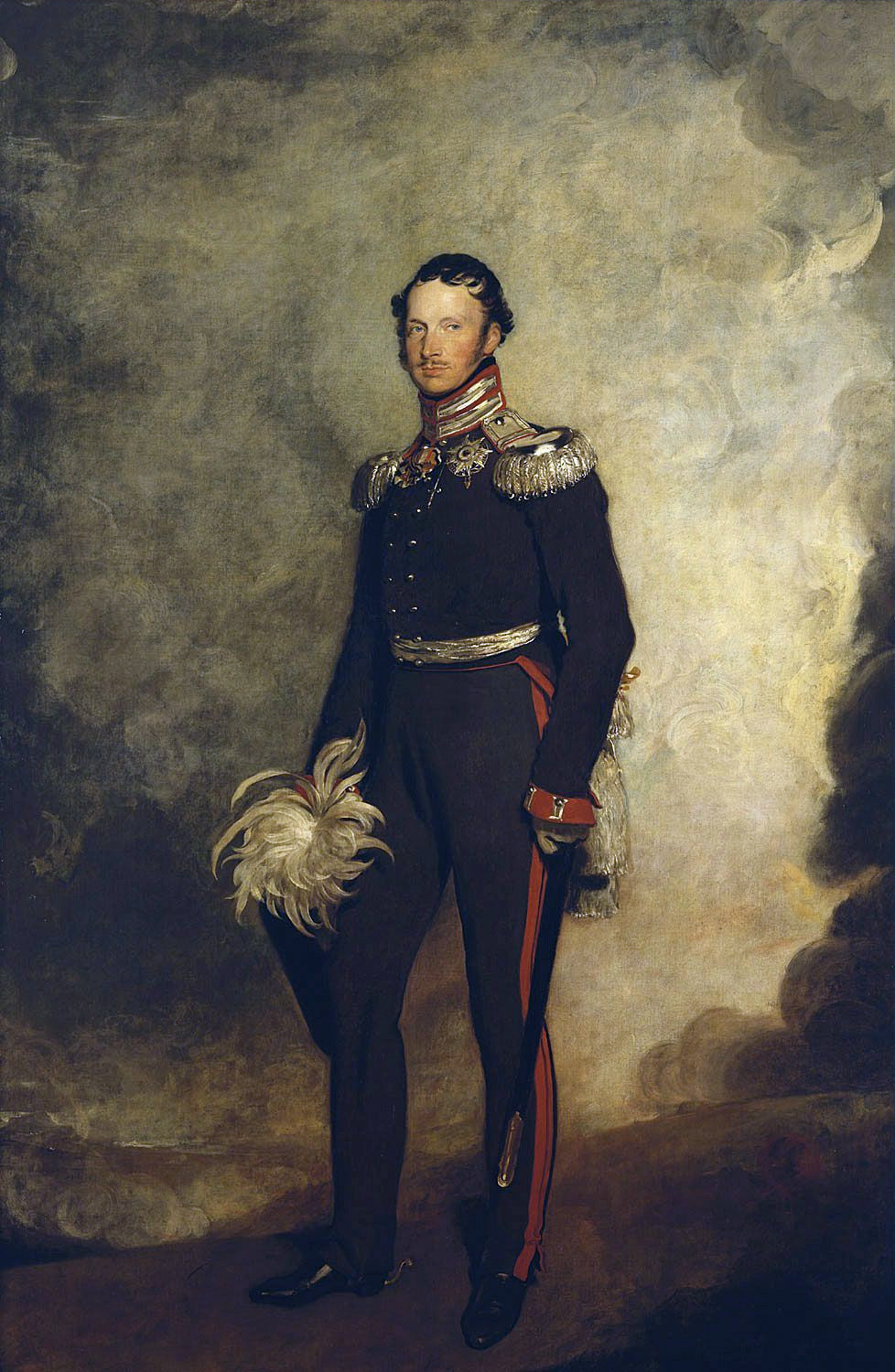
Portrait of Frederick William III of Prussia by Thomas Lawrence, c. 1814–18

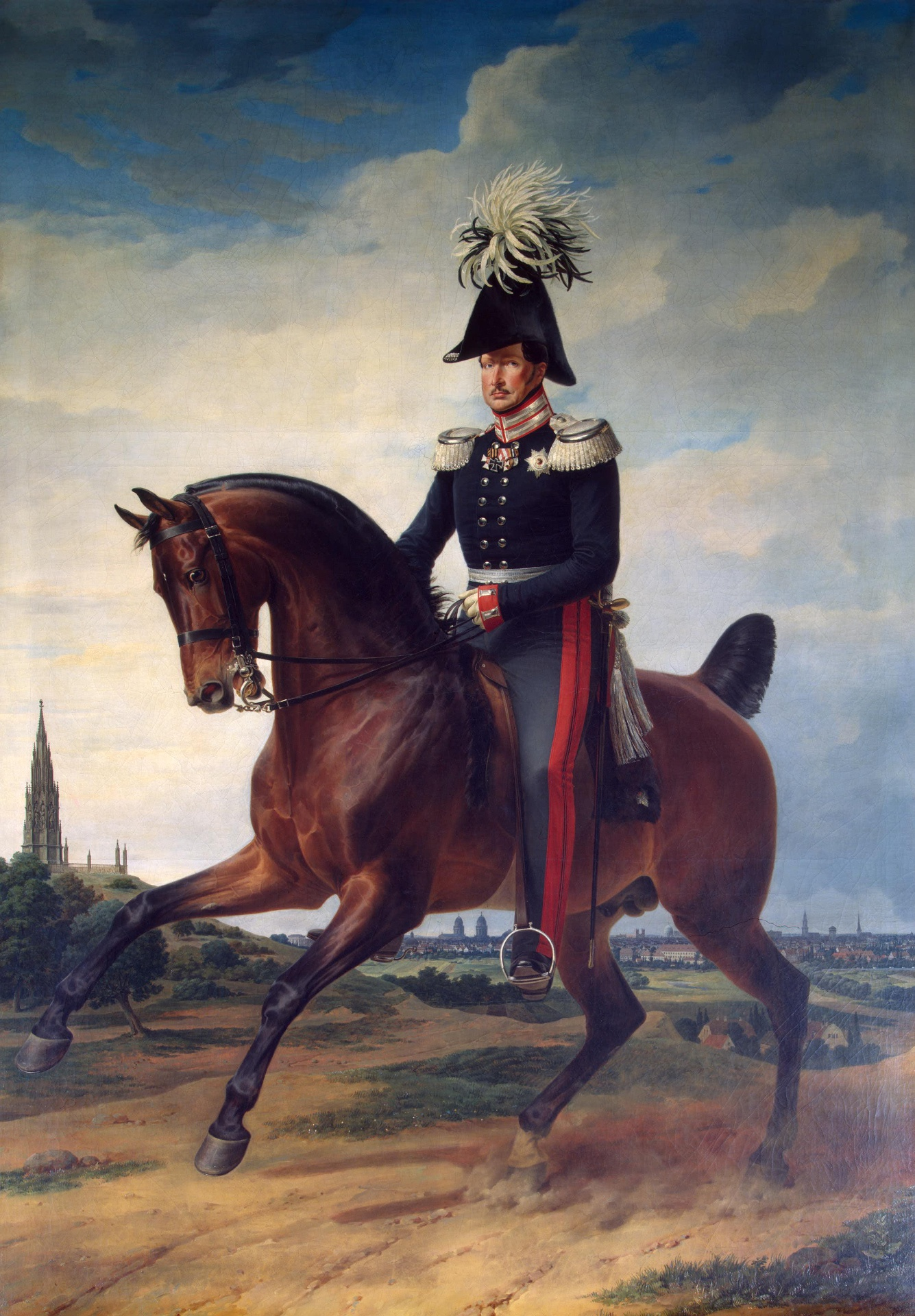
Equestrian portrait of Frederick William III by Franz Krüger (1831)

Frederick William was determined to unify the Protestant churches to homogenize their liturgy, organization, and architecture. The long-term goal was to have fully centralized royal control of all the Protestant churches in the Prussian Union of Churches. The merging of the Lutheran and Calvinist (Reformed) confessions to form the United Church of Prussia was highly controversial. Angry responses included a large and well-organized opposition. Especially the "Old Lutherans" in Silesia refused to abandon their liturgical traditions. The crown responded by attempting to silence protest. The stubborn Lutheran minority was coerced by military force, their churches' confiscation, and their pastors' imprisonment or exile. By 1834 outward union was secured based on common worship but separate symbols—the opponents of the measure being forbidden to form communities of their own. Many left Prussia, settling in South Australia, Canada, and the United States. The king's unsuccessful counterattack worsened tensions at the highest levels of government. The crown's aggressive efforts to restructure religion were unprecedented in Prussian history. In a series of proclamations over several years, the Church of the Prussian Union was formed, bringing together the majority group of Lutherans and the minority group of Reformed Protestants. The main effect was that the government of Prussia had full control over church affairs, with the king himself recognized as the leading bishop.

In 1824 Frederick William III married for the second time, to Countess Auguste von Harrach zu Rohrau und Thannhausen. At the time of their marriage, the House of Harrach was still not recognized as equal to other European royal families for dynastic purposes. The marriage was therefore morganatic and she was created Princess of Liegnitz. They had no children.

In 1838 the king distributed large parts of his farmland at Erdmannsdorf Estate to 422 Protestant refugees from the Austrian Zillertal, who built Tyrolean style farmhouses in the Silesian village.

=== Death ===
Frederick William III died on 7 June 1840 in Berlin, from a fever, survived by his second wife. His eldest son, Frederick William IV, succeeded him. Frederick William III is buried at the Mausoleum in Schlosspark Charlottenburg, Berlin.

== Issue ==
| Name | Birth | Death | Notes |
|---|---|---|---|
| (daughter, no name) | 1 October 1794 | 1 October 1794 | stillborn |
| Frederick William IV of Prussia | 15 October 1795 | 2 January 1861 | married Elisabeth Ludovika of Bavaria (1801–1873), no issue. |
| Wilhelm I, German Emperor | 22 March 1797 | 9 March 1888 | married Princess Augusta of Saxe-Weimar-Eisenach (1811–1890), had issue. |
| Princess Charlotte of Prussia | 13 July 1798 | 1 November 1860 | married Nicholas I of Russia (1796–1855), had issue including the future Alexander II of Russia |
| Princess Frederica of Prussia | 14 October 1799 | 30 March 1800 | died in childhood |
| Prince Charles of Prussia | 29 June 1801 | 21 January 1883 | married Princess Marie of Saxe-Weimar-Eisenach (1808–1877), had issue. |
| Princess Alexandrine of Prussia | 23 February 1803 | 21 April 1892 | married Paul Friedrich, Grand Duke of Mecklenburg-Schwerin (1800–1842), had issue. |
| Prince Ferdinand of Prussia | 13 December 1804 | 1 April 1806 | died in childhood |
| Princess Louise of Prussia | 1 February 1808 | 6 December 1870 | married Prince Frederik of the Netherlands (1797–1881), had issue. |
| Prince Albert (Albrecht) of Prussia | 4 October 1809 | 14 October 1872 | married Princess Marianne of the Netherlands (1810–1883), had issue; married second to Rosalie von Rauch (1820–1879), Countess of Hohenau, had issue. |

== Honours ==
- Prussia:
  - Knight of the Black Eagle, 11 September 1772
  - Founder of the Iron Cross, 10 March 1813
  - Founder of the Order of Louise, 13 August 1814
- Russian Empire:
  - Knight of St. Andrew, 29 January 1780
  - Knight of St. Alexander Nevsky, 29 January 1780
- Sweden:
  - Knight of the Seraphim, 23 December 1797
  - Grand Cross of the Sword, 1st Class, 6 February 1814
- France:
  - French Empire: Grand Eagle of the Legion of Honour, March 1805
  - Kingdom of France:
    - Knight of the Holy Spirit, 1815
    - Knight of St. Michael, 1815
- Austrian Empire: Knight of the Military Order of Maria Theresa, 1813
- Spain: Knight of the Golden Fleece, 30 May 1814
- United Kingdom: Knight of the Garter, 9 June 1814
- Denmark: Knight of the Elephant, 31 August 1814
- Netherlands: Grand Cross of the Military William Order, 9 July 1821
- Saxe-Weimar-Eisenach: Grand Cross of the White Falcon, 1 March 1823
- Baden:
  - Grand Cross of the House Order of Fidelity, 1823
  - Grand Cross of the Zähringer Lion, 1823
- Kingdom of Portugal: Grand Cross of the Sash of the Three Orders, 30 August 1825
- Kingdom of Bavaria: Knight of St. Hubert, 1826
- Kingdom of Sardinia: Knight of the Annunciation, 6 May 1833
- (Saxe-Coburg and Gotha) (Duchy of Saxe-Altenburg) (Saxe-Meiningen) Ernestine duchies: Grand Cross of the Saxe-Ernestine House Order, November 1834
- Kingdom of Saxony: Knight of the Rue Crown, 1836
- Grand Duchy of Hesse: Grand Cross of the Ludwig Order
- Two Sicilies:
  - Knight of St. Januarius
  - Grand Cross of St. Ferdinand and Merit
- Württemberg: Knight of the Golden Eagle

Torgauer Marsch is a German march dedicated to Frederick William III, it was written by a local residence in Torgau for his royal visit on 24 June 1817.

== Ancestry ==
Ancestors of Frederick William III

8. Frederick William I of Prussia
4. Prince Augustus William of Prussia
9. Princess Sophia Dorothea of Hanover
2. Frederick William II of Prussia
10. Ferdinand Albert II, Duke of Brunswick-Wolfenbüttel
5. Duchess Luise of Brunswick-Wolfenbüttel
11. Princess Antoinette of Brunswick-Wolfenbüttel
1. Frederick William III of Prussia
12. Louis VIII, Landgrave of Hesse-Darmstadt
6. Louis IX, Landgrave of Hesse-Darmstadt
13. Countess Charlotte of Hanau-Lichtenberg
3. Princess Frederica Louisa of Hesse-Darmstadt
14. Christian III, Count Palatine of Zweibrücken
7. Countess Palatine Caroline of Zweibrücken
15. Countess Caroline of Nassau-Saarbrücken

== Siblings ==
- Frederica Charlotte (1767–1820), who became Duchess of York by her marriage to Frederick, Duke of York
- Christine (1772–73)
- Louis Charles (1773–96)
- Frederica Louisa Wilhelmina (1774–1837), wife of William of Orange, afterward King William I of the Netherlands
- Augusta (1780–1841), wife of William II, Elector of Hesse
- Henry (1781–1846)
- William (1783–1851)

== Works ==
=== Marches ===
- Marsch I. Bataillon Garde, 1806
- Preussischer Präsentiermarsch

Frederick William III House of Hohenzollern Born: 3 August 1770 Died: 7 June 1840
Regnal titles
| Preceded by Frederick William II | Prince of Neuchâtel; 1797–1806 | Succeeded by Louis Alexandre Berthier |
| Preceded by Frederick William II | Elector of Brandenburg; 1797–1806 | Annexed by Prussia |
| Preceded by Frederick William II | King of Prussia; 1797–1840 | Succeeded by Frederick William IV |
| New creation | Grand Duke of Posen; 1815–1840 | Succeeded by Frederick William IV |
| Preceded by Louis Alexandre Berthier | Prince of Neuchâtel; 1814–1840 | Succeeded by Frederick William IV |
