= Training Band of the Bundeswehr =

Branch of the German army concerned with military music

- Ausbildungsmusikkorps der Bundeswehr
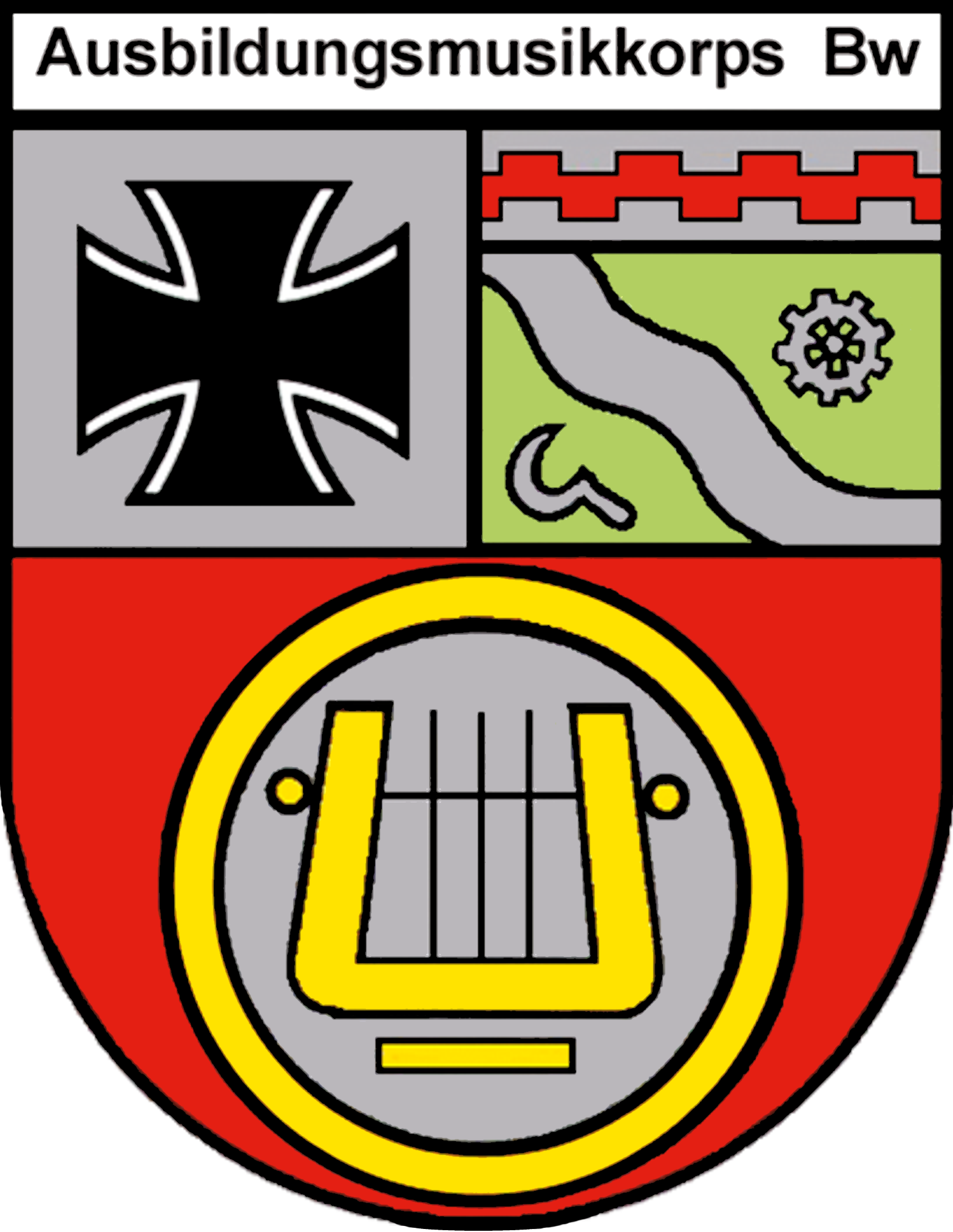
- Active: 1 July 1960; 64 years ago
- Country: Germany
- Branch: Bundeswehr
- Type: Military Band
- Size: 150 men and women
- Part of: Joint Support Service
- Garrison/HQ: Hilden

Commanders
- Head Conductor: Lieutenant Colonel Michael Euler

The Training Band of the Bundeswehr (German: Ausbildungsmusikkorps der Bundeswehr, AustMusKorpsBw) is the Bundeswehr's training music corps. It is responsible for training new musicians. It was created in Siegburg on 1 July 1960 and has been stationed in Hilden since 1969. It is subordinate to the other 13 music bands of the Bundeswehr and the Military Music Center of the Bundeswehr in Bonn. Every year the training band goes on a concert tour to demonstrate the success of their training. The task of the training band is to pave the way for young musicians to become professionals and to prepare them for future service in the Bundeswehr. Many members of the vand come from the Robert Schumann Hochschule in Düsseldorf. It consists of a teaching staff, three officers and one bandmaster, which coordinate and manage the training company, which offers can accommodate up to 150 musicians.

== History ==
Lieutenant Colonel Friedrich Deisenroth, known as a composer and arranger of numerous pieces of music and, in 1947, founder of the Hilchenbach Folk Music School, a predecessor of the South Westphalia Philharmonic, developed the concept for the military musical institution of the Bundeswehr in Siegburg. He created it on 1 July 1960. That November, Captain Ludwig Kühlechner became head of the training platoon and in December the first concerts took place under his leadership and that of his senior deputy, Sergeant Major Joseph Hoser. The following year, contracts were established with what is now the Hochschule für Musik und Tanz Köln. On 5 May 1969, the band was moved from Siegburg to the Waldkaserne in Hilden. The first music officer cadets were trained in the band in 1978 and completed their studies at the music academy in Düsseldorf. Colonel Michael Schramm (later the head of the Military Music Service of the Bundeswehr) was the first graduate of the school. The first female soldiers began their training in Hilden in 1991.

The construction of a new training center in Hilden necessitated a temporary relocation of the band until April 2018 to the Bergische Kaserne in the Hubbelrath district, which was then in the process of being disbanded. Two new building is located on approximately 6,400 square meters of space, which includes, among other things, 140 accommodation rooms, 68 practice rooms and 34 classrooms A special feature is the polygonal part of the building in the middle of the building complex with two rehearsal rooms and sound studio.

== Chiefs ==
- Captain Ludwig Kühlechner (1960–1962)
- Captain Ernst Müller and Captain Joseph Hoser (1962-1967)
- Lieutenant Colonel Fritz Wintermann (1967-1975)
- Lieutenant Colonel Bernhard Höfele (1976–1978)
- Lieutenant Colonel Andreas Lukacsy (1978–1980)
- Lieutenant Colonel Ulrich Hollmann (1980-1991)
- Major Michael Schramm (1991-1995)
- Major Walter Ratzek (1995-2001)
- Lieutenant Colonel Robert Kuckertz (2001–2007)
- Lieutenant Colonel Reinhard Kiauka (2007–2008)
- Lieutenant Colonel Michael Euler (Since 2008)

== See also ==
- Military bands of the Bundeswehr
- Royal Military School of Music
- Canadian Forces School of Music
