= Preussischer Präsentiermarsch =

German military march

The Preußischer Präsentiermarsch (Prussian Inspection March), also known as the Präsentiermarsch "Friedrich Wilhelms III.", is a German military march composed by Frederick William III of Prussia at his young age, inspired by the Hautboist corps in the late 18th century. This have been forgotten soon and the sheet music was rediscovered in 1835. Then it was performed in the Kalisch Review. In 1841, Frederick William IV ordered including this march in Armeemarschsammlung. As a traditional inspection march used in every German military since the mid-19th century, this is the traditional inspection and colors presentation march of the German Federal Armed Forces, the Bundeswehr. It is also played during visits by foreign leaders to Germany by the Staff Band of the Bundeswehr (German: Stabsmusikkorps der Bundeswehr) during arrival honors ceremonies. It is also a favorite piece of German marching bands, played in civil functions and parades. In Bolivia this has become the standard marchpast piece of the Bolivian Navy, but adapted in slow time.
