= Air Force Band Erfurt =

- Luftwaffenmusikkorps Erfurt
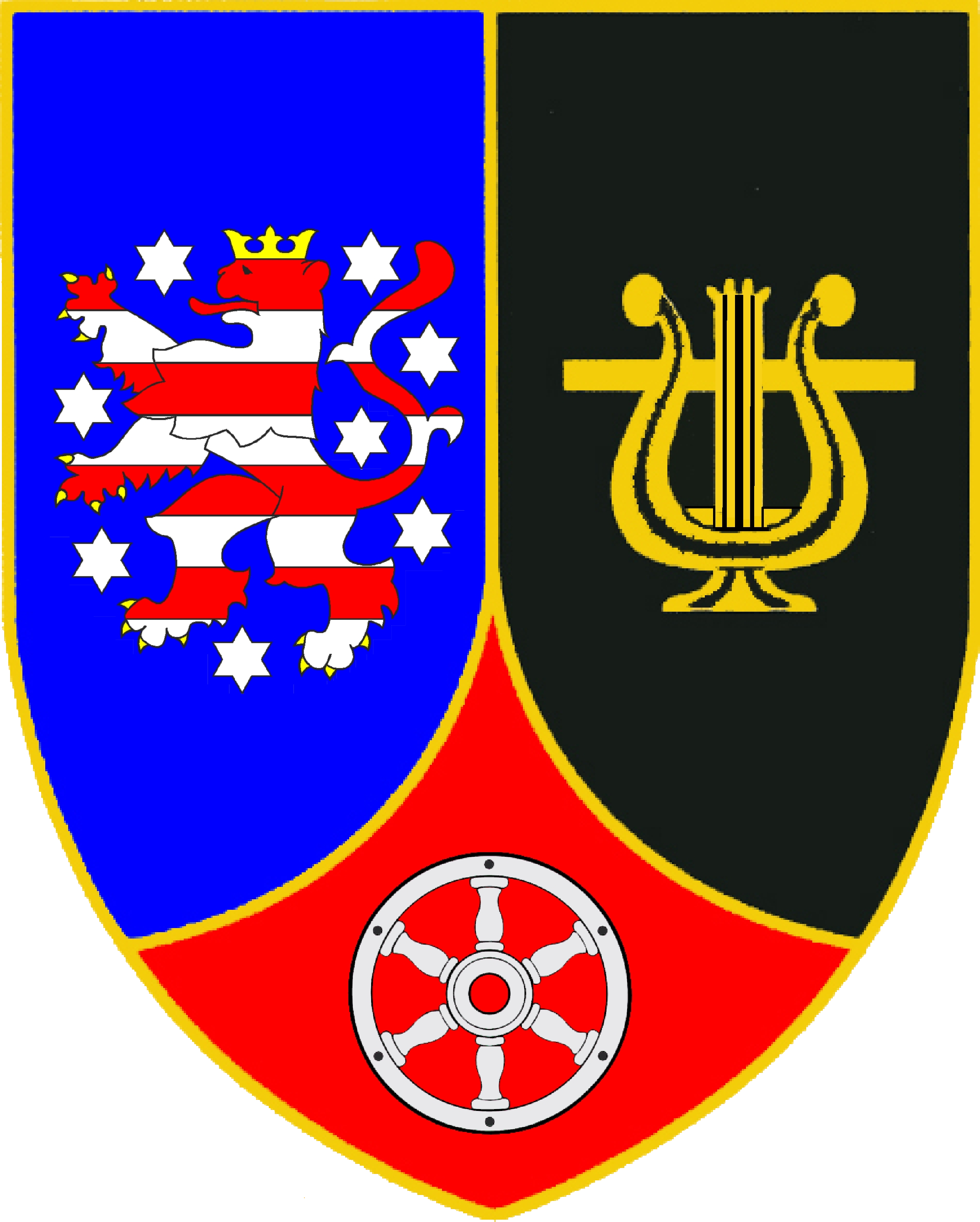
- Active: 15 March 1991 - Present
- Country: Germany
- Allegiance: Bundeswehr
- Branch: German Air Force
- Type: Air force band of the Bundeswehr
- Role: Musical Support/Raising the esprit de corps (morale)
- Size: 56 members
- Garrison/HQ: Erfurt
- Colors: Blue, Grey and White

Commanders
- Current commander: Lieutenant Colonel Tobias Wunderle (Since July 2018)

The Air Force Band Erfurt (German: Luftwaffenmusikkorps Erfurt) is a German Air Force (Luftwaffe) military band founded in 1991 to provide musical support to the city of Erfurt and the German Air Force. Its area of responsibility spans across the German states of Thuringia, Saxony, Saxony-Anhalt, Brandenburg and northern Bavaria. The 56 member band has travelled internationally to concerts in Belgium, France, Great Britain, Canada, Poland, and the United States. Its scope of duties include protocol operations such as state visits and military parades, as well as other events such as charity concerts.

The band has 6 ensembles:

- Concert band
- Egerland band
- Brass quintet
- Saxophone quartet
- Clarinet quartet
- Woodwind Trio

It emerged from the Central Band of the National People's Army Air Forces of the Military Music Service of the NPA In March–April 1991 as the Army Band 70 in Erfurt. It was renamed to the Heeresmusikkorps in July 1994 and the Military District Band III in October 2001. until the end of March 2015, it appeared as a military band music corps III. Since 1 April 2015, it has been called Air Force Band Erfurt. Just under a year earlier, on 30 July 2014, Defense Minister Ursula von der Leyen announced that the northern Thuringian Garnisonstadt Sondershausen military bands will be preserved in Erfurt and the resolution planned for 2017 will not be pursued.

== Conductors ==
- Captain Georg Nitsche (1991–1993)
- Lieutenant Colonel Bernd Männel (1993–2006)
- Captain Christian Prchal (2006–2007)
- Lieutenant Colonel Roland Kahle (2007–2015)
- Lieutenant Colonel Burkard Zenglein (2015–2018)
- Lieutenant Colonel Tobias Wunderle (1 July 2018–Present)
