= Air Force Band Münster =

Air Force Band Münster — LwMusKorps Münster —
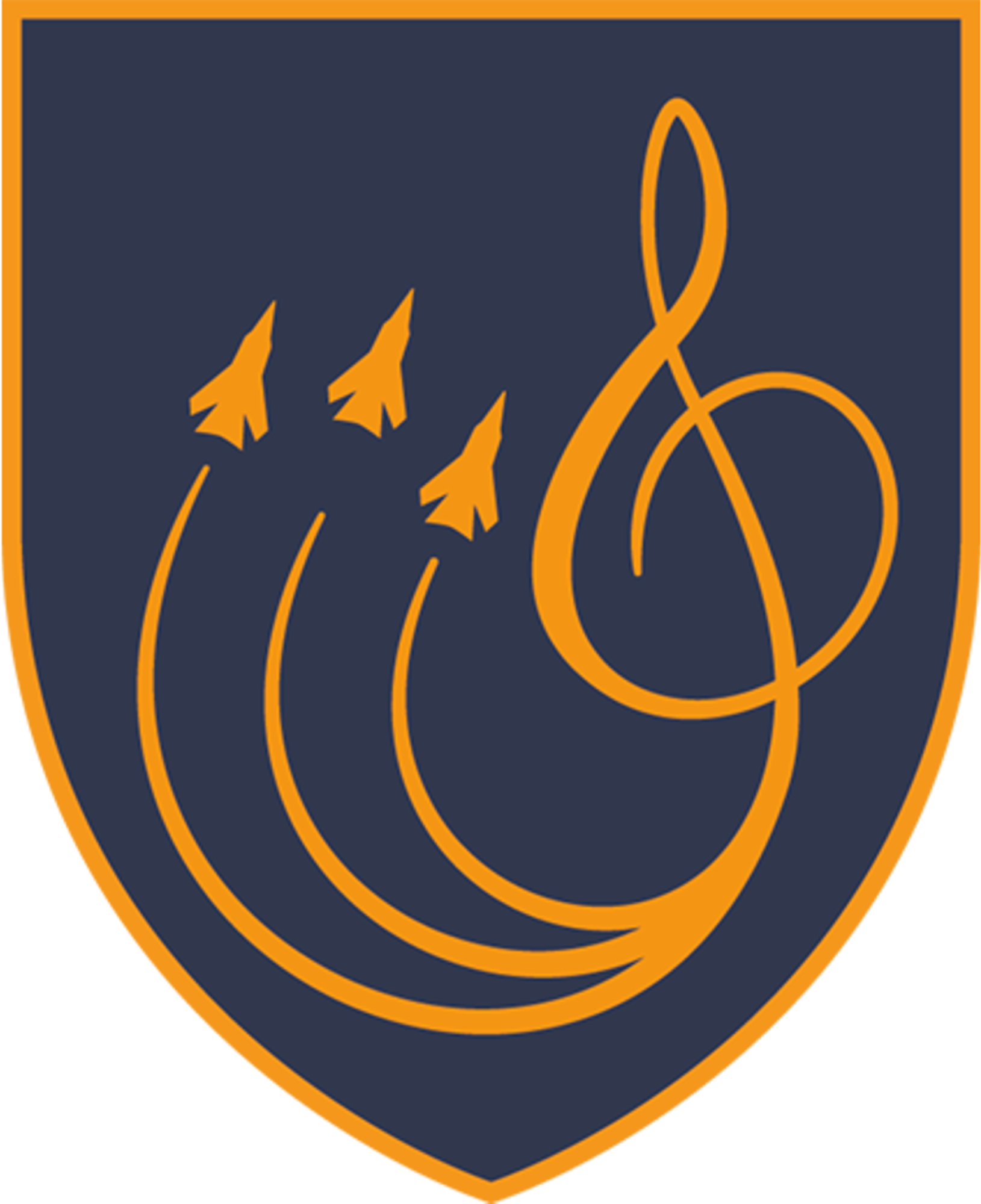
- Coat of Arms for Air Force Band Münster
- Active: 1958 - Present
- Country: Germany
- Allegiance: Bundeswehr
- Branch: Luftwaffe
- Type: Military Band
- Size: ~60 Men
- Garrison/HQ: Münster
- Website: www.luftwaffenmusikkorps.de

Commanders
- Current commander: Major Alexander Kalweit

Air Force Band Münster (Luftwaffenmusikkorps Münster) was founded in 1958 to serve as a military band for the German Air Force. It was initially formed in Uetersen as a single unit, Air Force Band 1. Two more were created in March 1959. Following this, the three units were garrisoned in Karlsruhe, Münster, and Neubiberg. On 26 October 2011, the merging of the three bands was announced by the Federal Minister of Defence in the course of a planned reform. On 24 March 2014, the three Air Force Bands combined to form Air Force Band Münster, or Air Force Band 3.

== History ==
The original three Air Force Bands shadowed the Bundeswehr in Upper Bavaria, Swabia, Franconia and Upper Palatinate during military ceremonies. They often operated beyond German borders as part of public relations. This included numerous excursions abroad, namely concerts in Italy, France, Japan, the Netherlands, Hungary, and Canada, missions in the US, UK, Switzerland, Turkey, Portugal, Belgium, the Czech Republic, Romania, Austria, Uzbekistan, Oman, and Afghanistan. Many of the concerts were charity events, with proceeds being donated to a specific cause or charitable organization. Following the unification of the three bands, nearly all public concerts serve as charity events.

Naturally, the majority of Air Force Band's tasks were in Germany. These included providing music for the 1972 Olympic Games in Munich, their appearance as "The Merry Musicians" on ZDF, as well as the NATO Music Festival in Kaiserslautern and Mönchengladbach. They played many concerts, including ones in Karlsruhe, Bremen, Hamburg, Kiel, Braunschweig, Stuttgart, and in 1998 at the Olympiastadion in Berlin, which marked the 50th anniversary of the end of the Berlin blockade. Unification of the three bands has not changed their repertoire; Air Force Band Münster still performs regularly. Along with traditional concerts, their activities now include recording for television and CD production.

== Directors ==
- Johannes Schade (11 July 1956 – 1 May 1964)
- Ottomar Fabry (2 May 1964 – 22 September 1987)
- Simon Dach (23 September 1987 – 30 September 1992)
- Hans Orterer (1 October 1992 – 30 June 1996)
- Lutz Bammler (1 July 1996 – 31 March 2003)
- Christian Blüggel (1 April 2003 – 29 Juli 2003)
- Michael Wintering (30 July 2003 – 21 April 2010)
- Martin Kötter (22 April 2010 – 31 December 2011)
- Timor Oliver Chadik (1 January 2012 – 31 December 2014)
- Christian Weiper (1 January 2015 - 21 February 2022)
- Alexander Kalweit (22 February 2022)
