= Staff Band of the Bundeswehr =

- Stabsmusikkorps der Bundeswehr
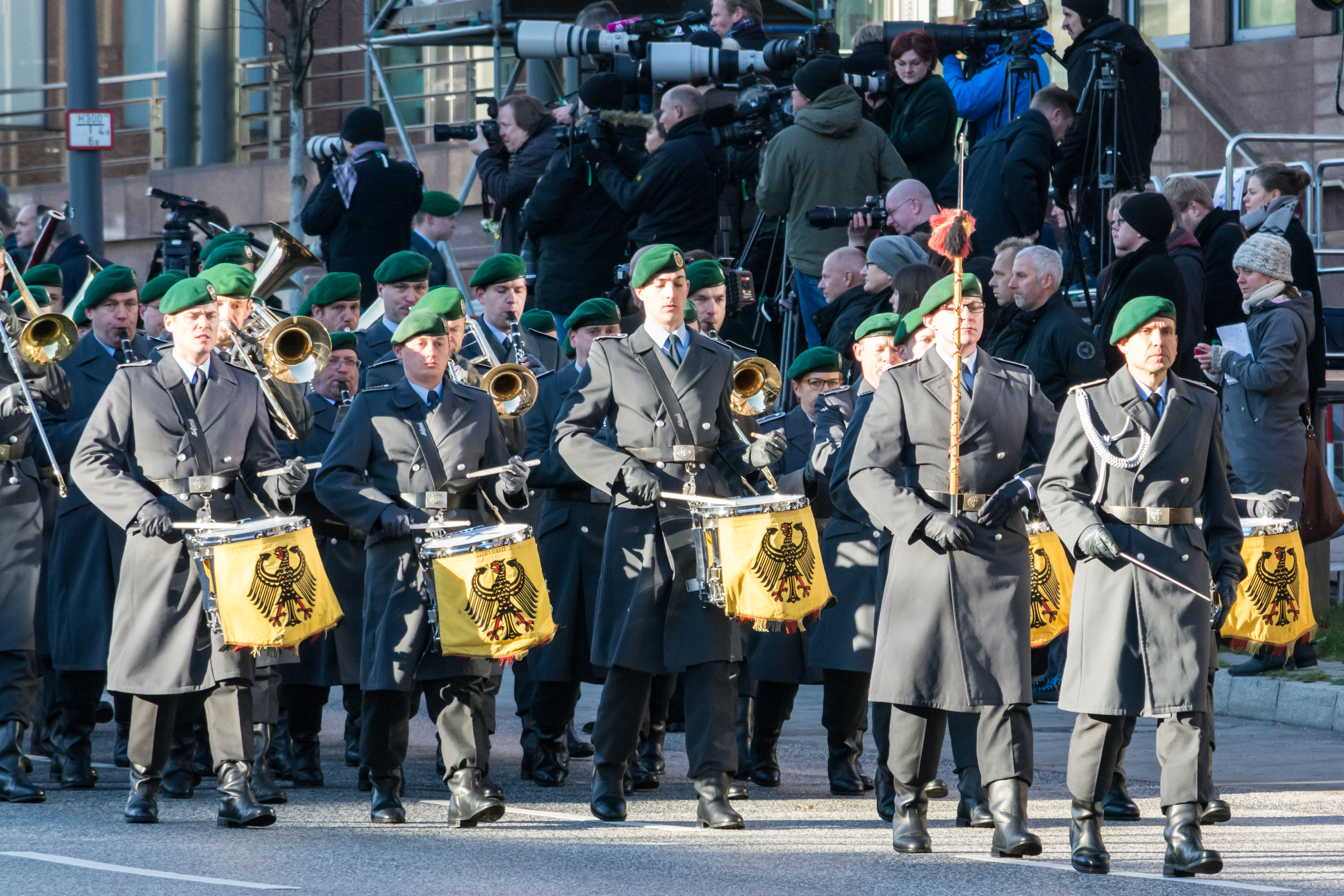
- The Staff Band of the Bundeswehr during the funeral of Chancellor Helmut Schmidt in 2015.
- Active: 1 April 1991; 35 years ago
- Country: Germany
- Branch: Bundeswehr
- Type: Military Band
- Part of: German Army
- Garrison/HQ: Berlin
- Nickname: StMusKorps

Commanders
- Senior Director of Music Bundeswehr/Head Conductor Staff Band: Lieutenant Colonel Reinhard Kiauka

Insignia
- Identification symbol

The Staff Band of the Bundeswehr (German: Stabsmusikkorps der Bundeswehr) is the main representative brass band of the Bundeswehr, stationed in Berlin. It works together with the Wachbataillon in the Berlin Garrison Command, having responsibility for protocol during state receptions of the Federal President, Chancellor and the Minister of Defense. The band is responsible for performing pieces such as the anthems of foreign countries as well as the Preussischer Präsentiermarsch during arrival honors ceremonies for visits by foreign leaders to Germany. It is among 6 other German military bands that fall under the command of the Joint Support Service.

== History ==
The Stabsmusikkorps der Bundeswehr was created on 16 February 1957 under the official training designation as the Lehrmusikkorps, based at Rheinbach near Bonn with 16 musicians initially. On 16 June, Hauptmann Friedrich Deisenroth took over with command duties and increased the musical strength to 50 bandsmen. Their first duties included performing in public alongside the drill and ceremony oriented Wachbataillon in the new West German capital in September. In November 1957, the Stabsmusikkorps had performed in its maiden studio recording, which would be one of its last acts before it was dissolved by the government.

The new Staff Band was founded on 1 April 1991 as the Eastern Army Band in Potsdam. In January 1994 it was renamed to the Heeresmusikkorps and was relocated to Berlin on 1 April 1995. On 1 July 2000, the Stabsmusikkorps in its current form was established. The Staff Band of the Bundeswehr has been led by Lieutenant Colonel Reinhard Kiauka since 2014.

== Gallery ==
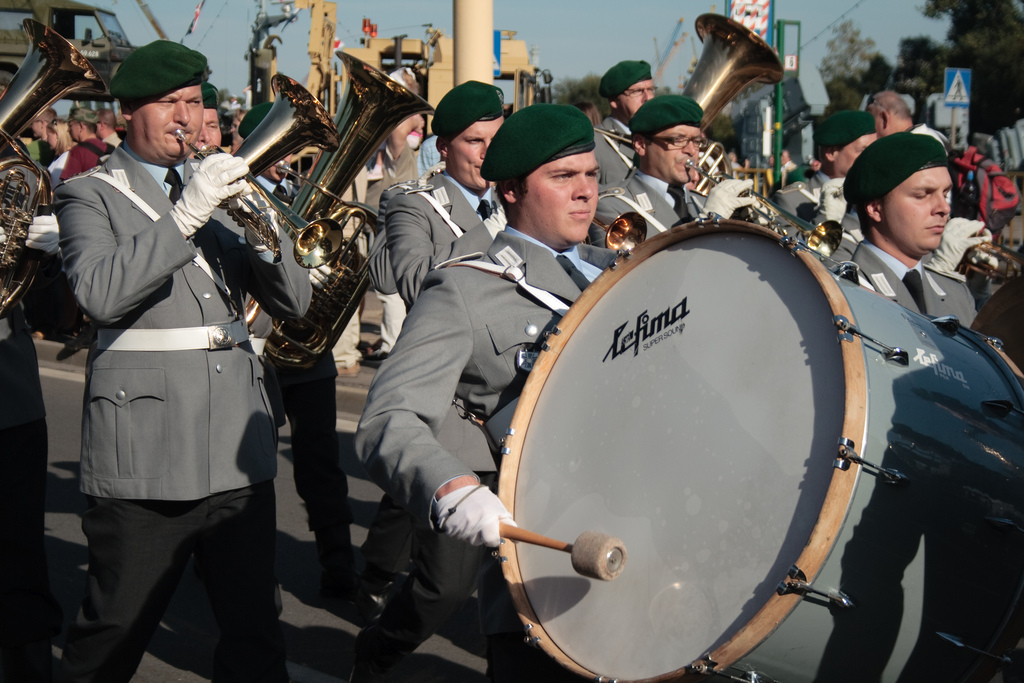

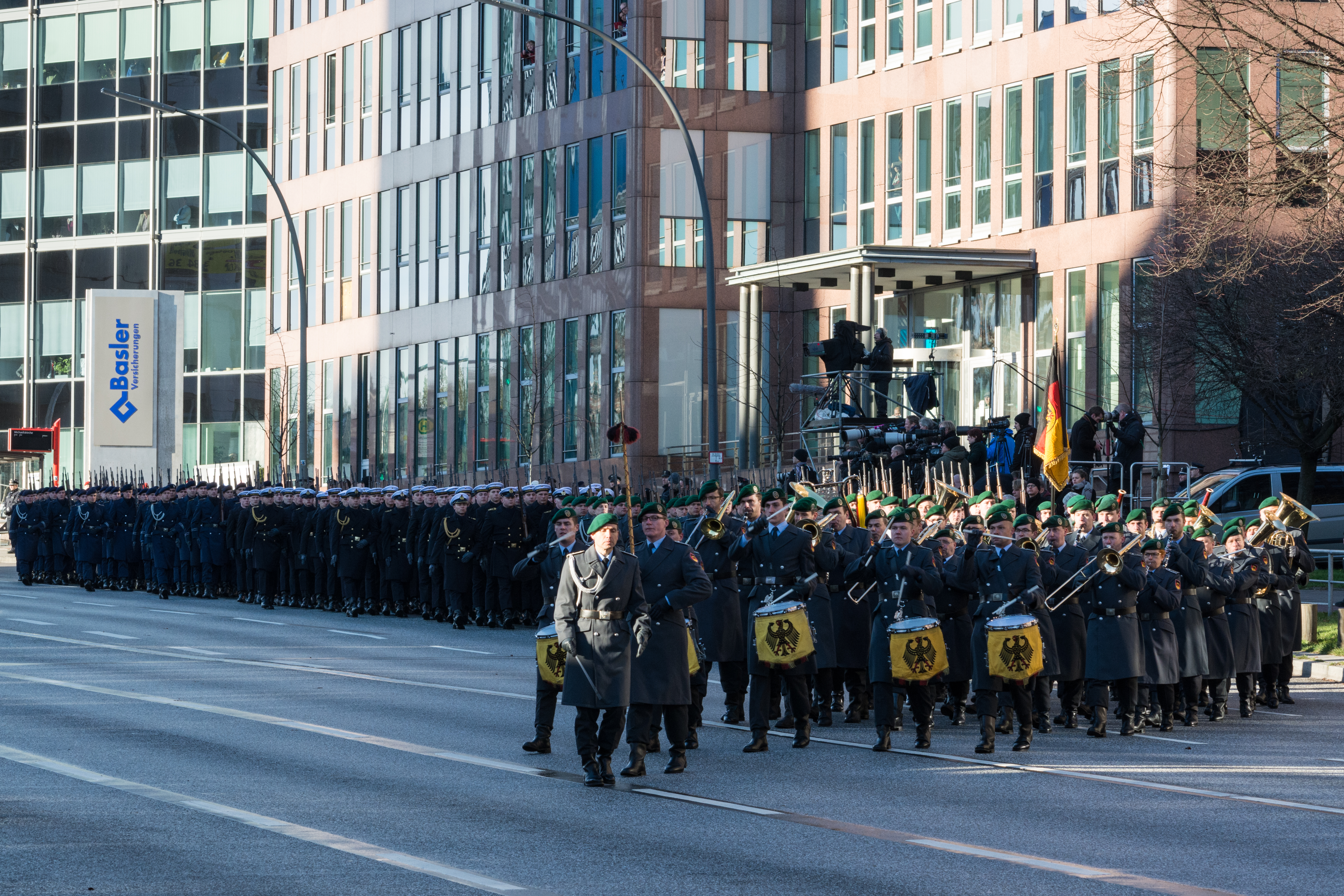

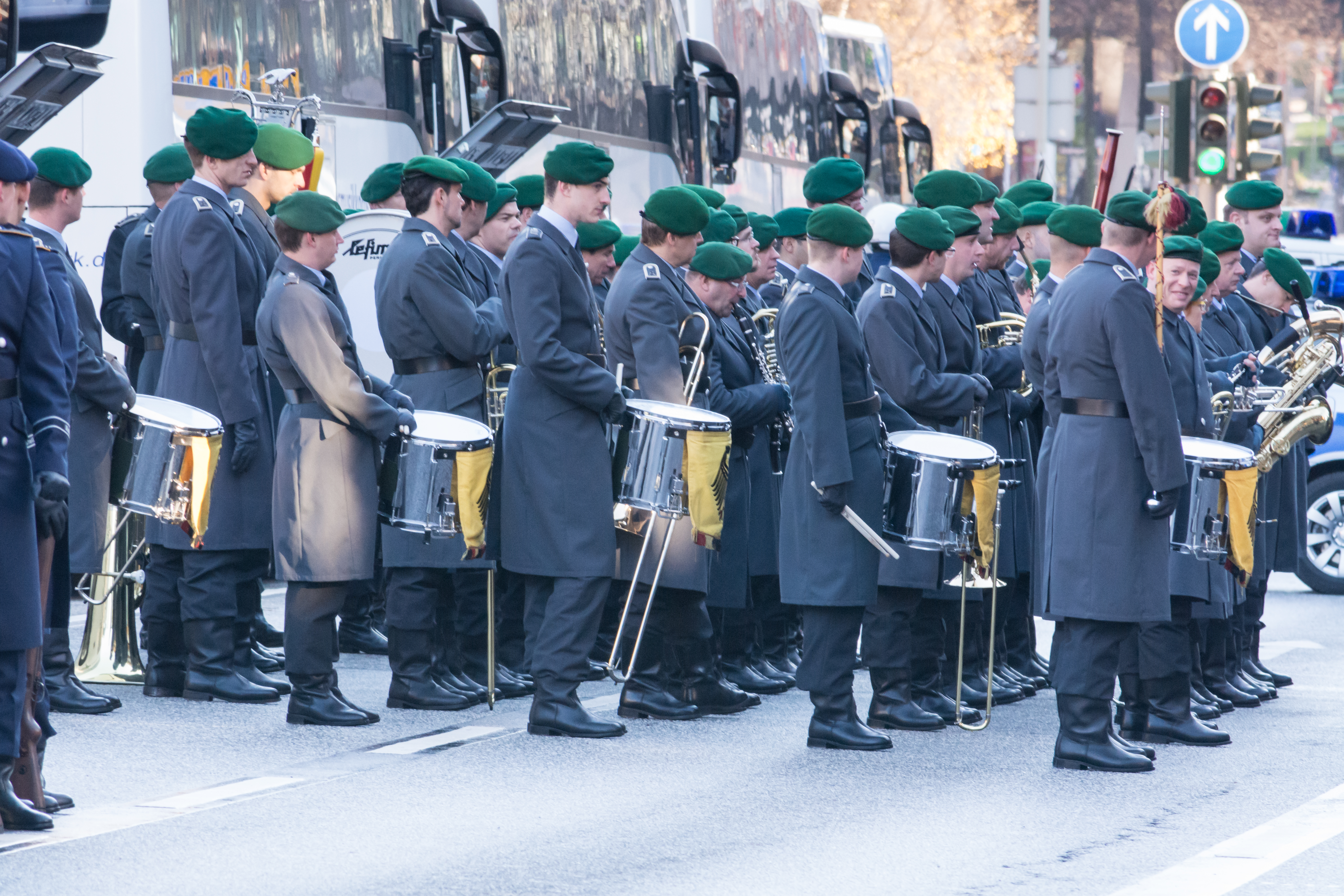

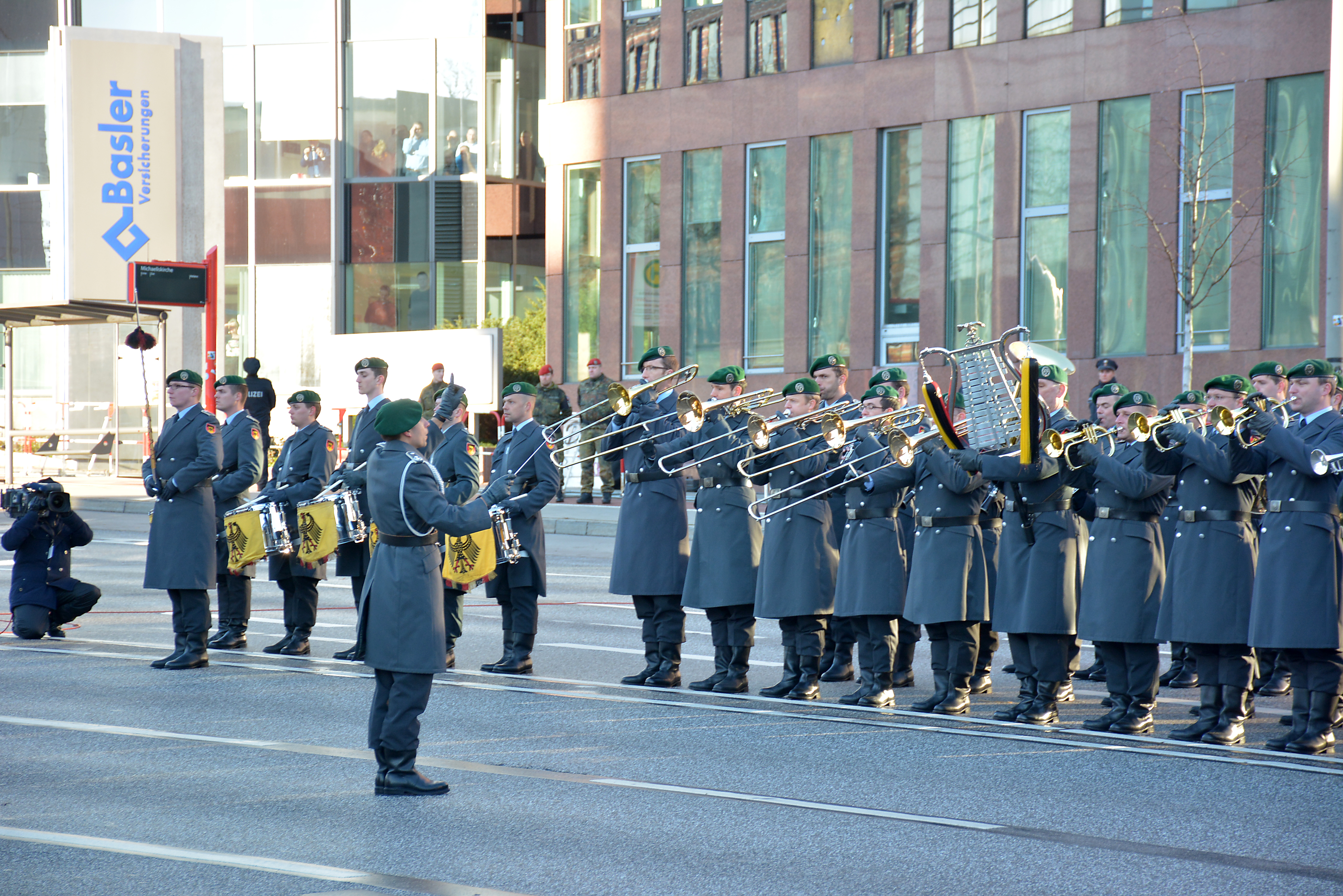

== See also ==
- Military band
- German Heer
- Army Band Hannover
- Military bands of the Bundeswehr
- Military Music Service of the National People's Army
