= Navy Band Kiel =

- Marinemusikkorps Kiel
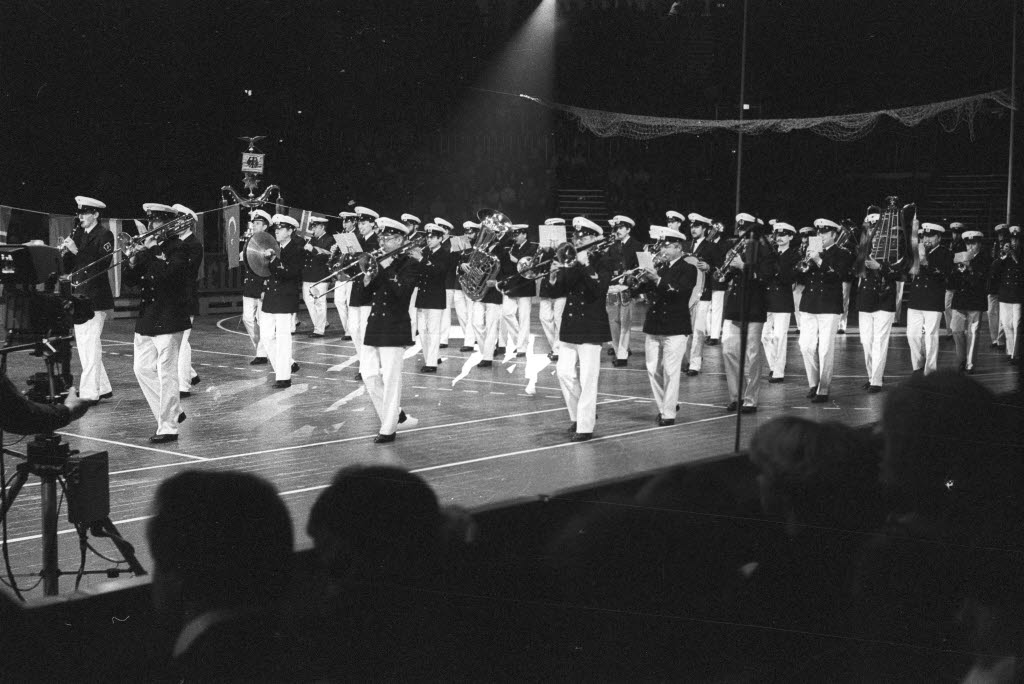
- The band at Sportpressefest, 20 January 1984.
- Active: 1 June 1956 – Present
- Country: Germany
- Allegiance: Bundeswehr
- Branch: German Navy
- Type: Military band of the Bundeswehr
- Role: public duties
- Size: 50 professional musicians
- Part of: Joint Support Service
- HQ: 14 Greifswalder Street, Kiel

Commanders
- Director: Lieutenant Commander Inga Hilsberg (since February 2022)
- Deputy Director: Lieutenant Andreas Siry

Insignia
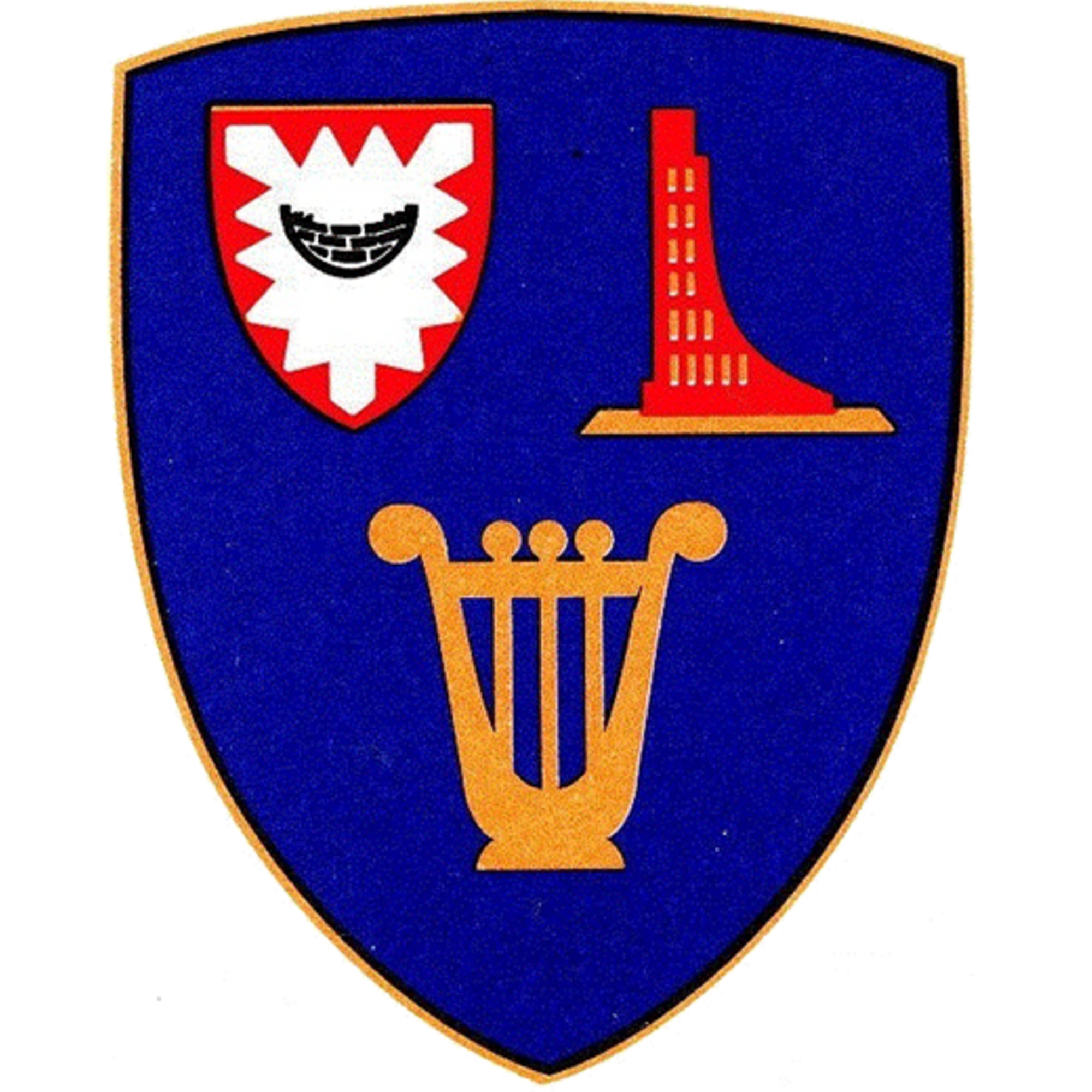
- Insignia

Navy Band Kiel (German: Marinemusikkorps Kiel) is a military band of the German Navy responsible for raising the esprit de corps or morale of personnel of the Navy. The 50 professional musicians has an area of responsibility for the northern German state of Schleswig-Holstein. It also covers the entire coastal region of Germany on the North and Baltic Seas, with the states of Lower Saxony and Mecklenburg-Vorpommern as well as the cities of Bremen and Hamburg.

The band has 6 ensembles:

- Concert band
- Egerland band
- Nighttime-Band
- Brass quintet
- Clarinet quartet
- Brass quartet
- Woodwind quintet
- Ocean´s 12 (12 woodwinds and brass incl. drums)

The task of the band is mainly in troop support, all of which includes the ceremonial entry and exit of ships and the swearing-in of sailors. An important part is also public relations with residents of the Kiel area and northern Germany. concerts at home and abroad. As part of the public relations work, the band performs at numerous charity concerts. In recent years, more than 3.2 million euros have been made in donations.

== Brief history ==
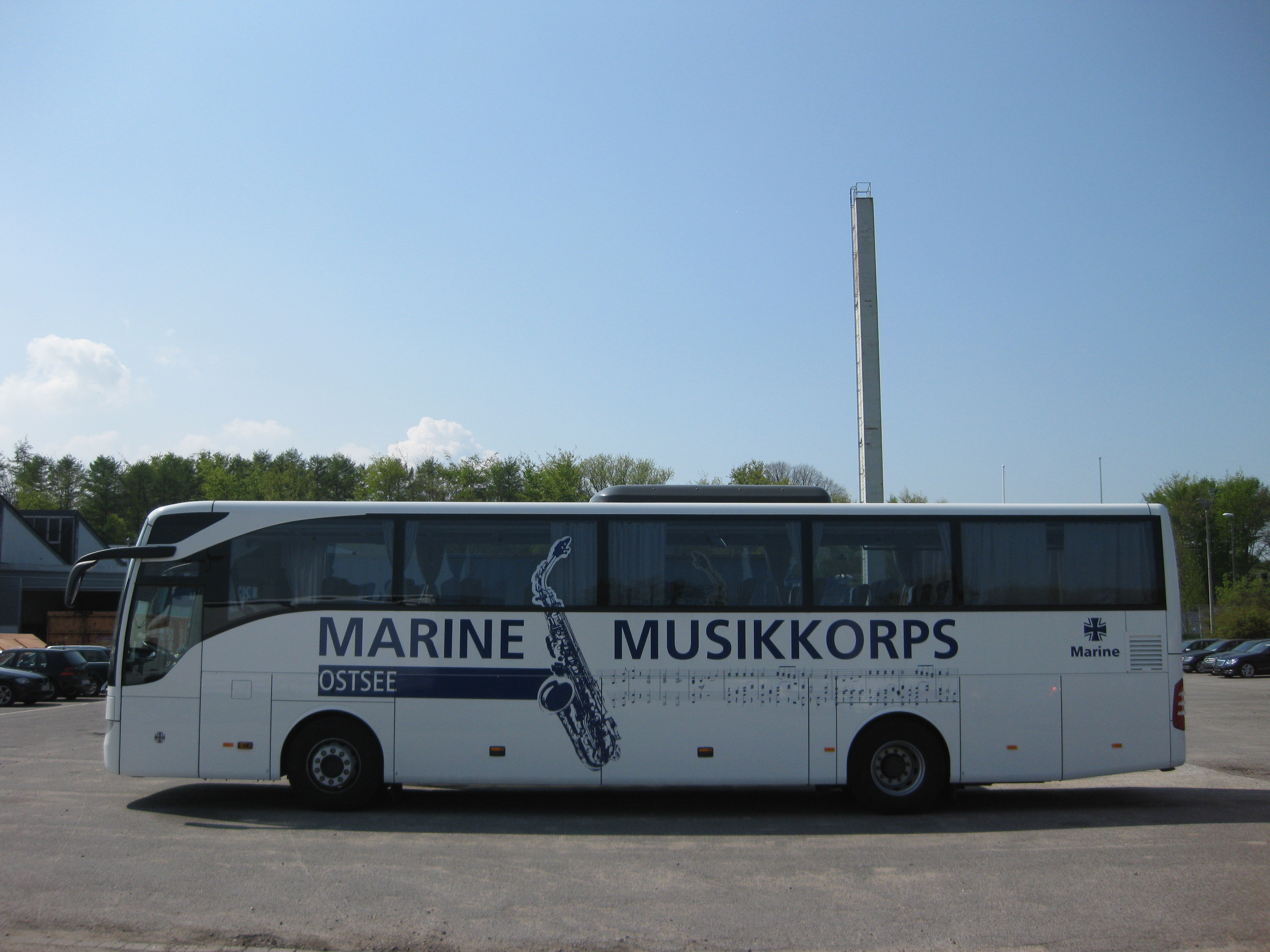
The tour bus of the band in April 2014.

Navy Band Kiel was set up on 1 June 1956 under the designation Navy Band Ostsee (Baltic Sea) in Eckernförde. At the same time, Navy Band North Sea in Wilhelmshaven was established, and was affiliated to the Ostsee Band and was housed in the band's base at Kiel Airport. At first, there was a lack of personnel and instruments, so the ability to continue operated depended solely on cooperation between the two bands. In July 1957, cooperation ended and Navy Band North Sea was able to return to its intended location in Wilhelmshaven. In March 2014, the band in Wilhelmshaven was dissolved and merged with the Baltic Sea Band to become Navy Band Kiel, which became the sole official band of the Navy until 2019, when Navy Band North Sea was reinstated with the new name of Navy Band Wilhelmshaven.

== Directors ==
- Lieutenant Hermann Schäfer (July 1956 – December 1959)
- Frigate Captain Johannes Schäfer (December 1959 – April 1973)
- Corvette Captain Horst Wenzel (April 1973 – May 1986)
- Frigate Captain Manfred Peter (June 1986 – June 2008)
- Frigate Captain Friedrich Szepansky (July 2008 – February 2022)
- Lieutenant Commander Inga Hilsberg (February 2022 - Present)
