= Army Band Hannover =

- Heeresmusikkorps Hannover
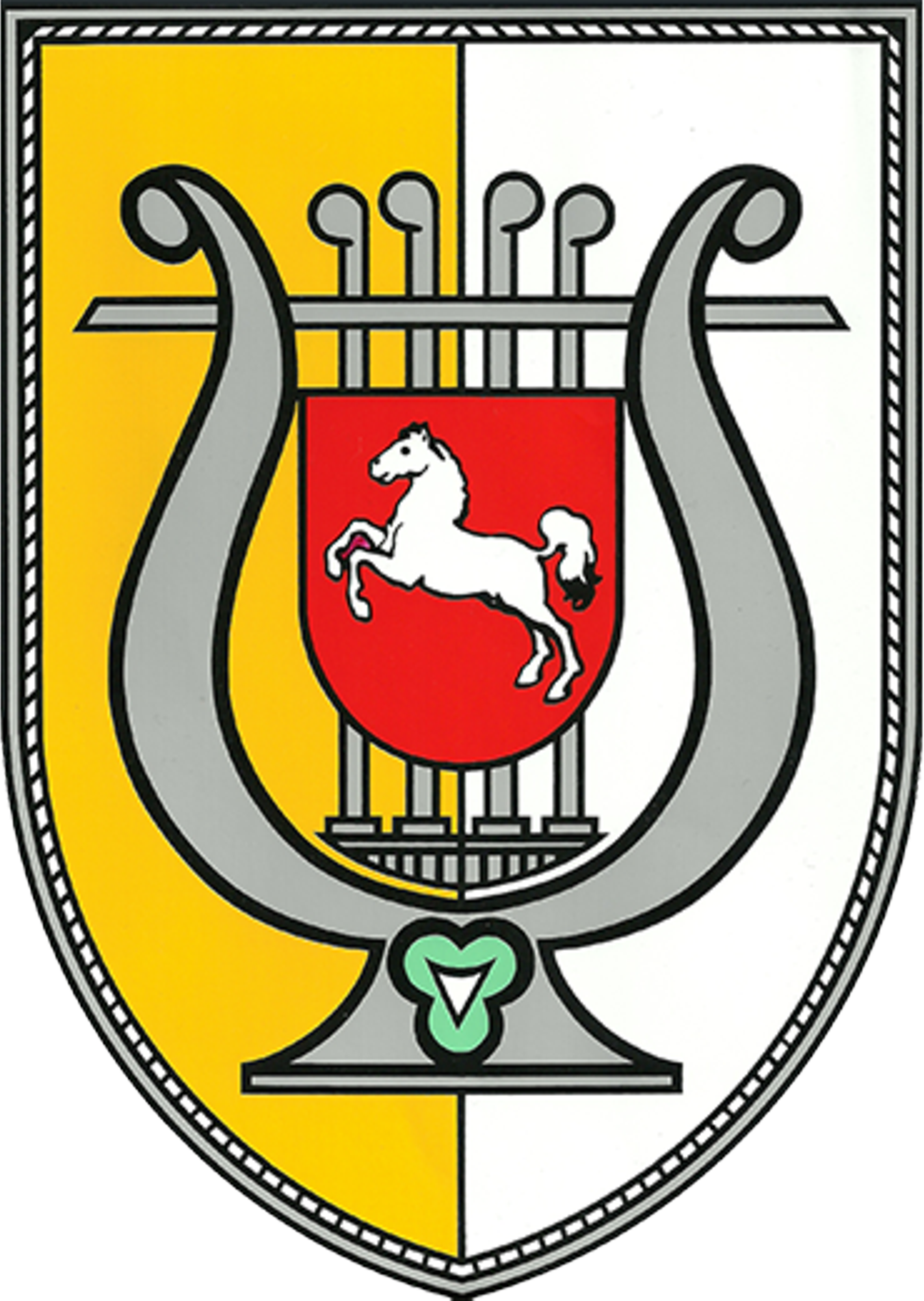
- Insignia
- Founded: 1 July 1956
- Country: Germany
- Branch: Streitkräftebasis
- Type: Command
- Role: Military music
- Size: 60 personnel
- Part of: 1st Panzer Division (Bundeswehr)
- Location: Hannover

Commanders
- Director of Music: Lieutenant Colonel Martin Wehn
- Ceremonial chief: Captain Harald Sandmann

The Army Band Hannover (German: Heeresmusikkorps Hannover) is a musical band unit of the German Army based in Hannover, Lower Saxony.

== Description ==
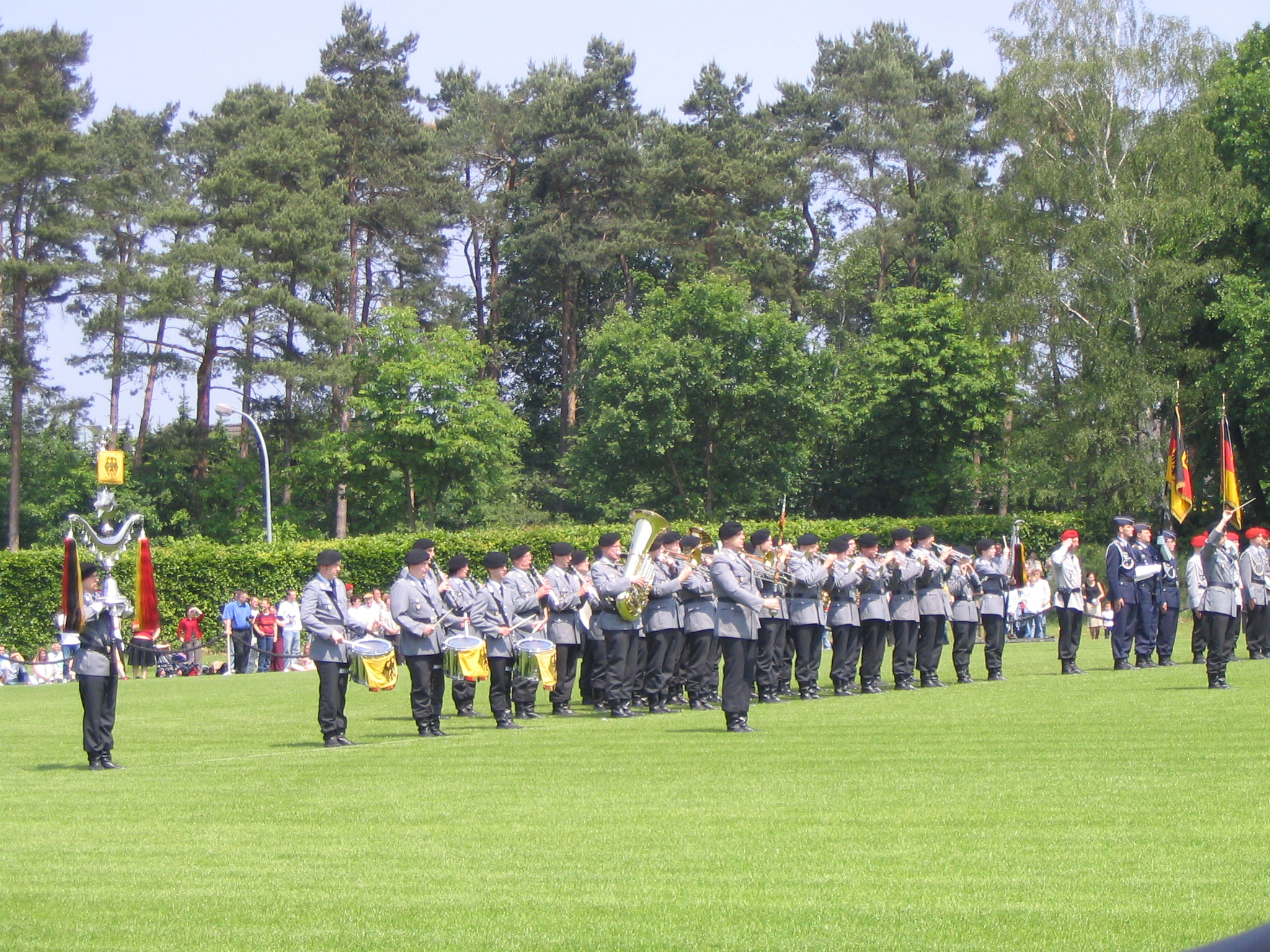
The band during the taking of the Ceremonial oath of the Bundeswehr in 2006.

It was established as Musikkorps II A on 1 July 1956. Its founding came at a time when military bands of East Germany and West Germany were being founded, with then-Chancellor Konrad Adenauer of West Germany placing significant importance to the founding of similar army bands during the development period of the German Heer. It later on was given the name "Army Band 1" in 1959, following its joining with the 1st Panzer Division that year. Army Band 1 published in 1967 its first official record which was called the "Great Concert of the Bundeswehr". Since then, the band has produced numerous CDs of its music, with the most one being made in January 2011. Like the Staff Band of the Bundeswehr, the band is responsible for the musical aspect of the ceremonial protocol events that take place in the federal states of Lower Saxony and North Rhine-Westphalia.

Besides serving in its area of responsibility, the Army Band Hannover also takes part in other national and international events with a professional background. These include appearances on local and national radio and television stations such as Bremen Vier and Vodafone Deutschland. The band also has had a history of taking part in military music festivals and international events such as the 1972 Summer Olympics in Munich.

== Ensembles ==
- Ceremonial Band
  - Corps of Drums
- Concert Band
- Dance Band
- Woodwinds Ensemble
- Brass Ensemble
- Wind quartet

== List of conductors ==
- 1956-1966 Major Martin Kothe
- 1966-1978 Lieutenant Colonel Hans Herzberg
- 1978-1987 Lieutenant Colonel Eberhard von Freymann
- 1987-1991 Lieutenant Colonel Robert Kuckertz
- 1991-1996 Lieutenant Colonel Martin Kötter
- 1996-2008 Lieutenant Colonel Friedrich Szepansky
- 2008-2014 Lieutenant Colonel Manfred Peter
- 2014-today Lieutenant Colonel Martin Wehn
