= Treaty of Kalisz (1813) =

1813 treaty between Russia and Prussia

The Treaty of Kalisz was signed in Kalisz (German: Kalisch, Russian: Kalish/Калиш) on 28 February 1813, between Russia and Prussia against Napoleon I. It marked the final changeover of Prussia onto the side against Napoleon.

The events that led to this alliance date back to 30 December 1812, at Tauroggen when Lieutenant-General Ludwig Yorck von Wartenburg, on behalf of his Prussian troops, and General Hans Karl von Diebitsch of the Russian Army signed the Convention of Tauroggen. The Convention of Tauroggen armistice, signed by Diebitsch and Yorck, "neutralised" the Prussian corps without consent of their king. The news was received with the wildest enthusiasm in Prussia, but the Prussian Court dared not throw off the mask yet, and an order was dispatched suspending Yorck from his command pending a court-martial. Two months later, the Prussians officially switched sides when Prussia and Russia signed the treaty and agreed to establish an alliance against Napoleon known as the Kalisz Union.

The treaty is also an interesting example of the predominance of the French language at this time. The text of the treaty was written in French, even though it was intended to arrange hostilities against France.

== See also ==
- War of the Sixth Coalition
- Convention of Tauroggen
- List of treaties
- Kalisch Review
