= Mountain Band of the Bundeswehr =

- Gebirgsmusikkorps der Bundeswehr
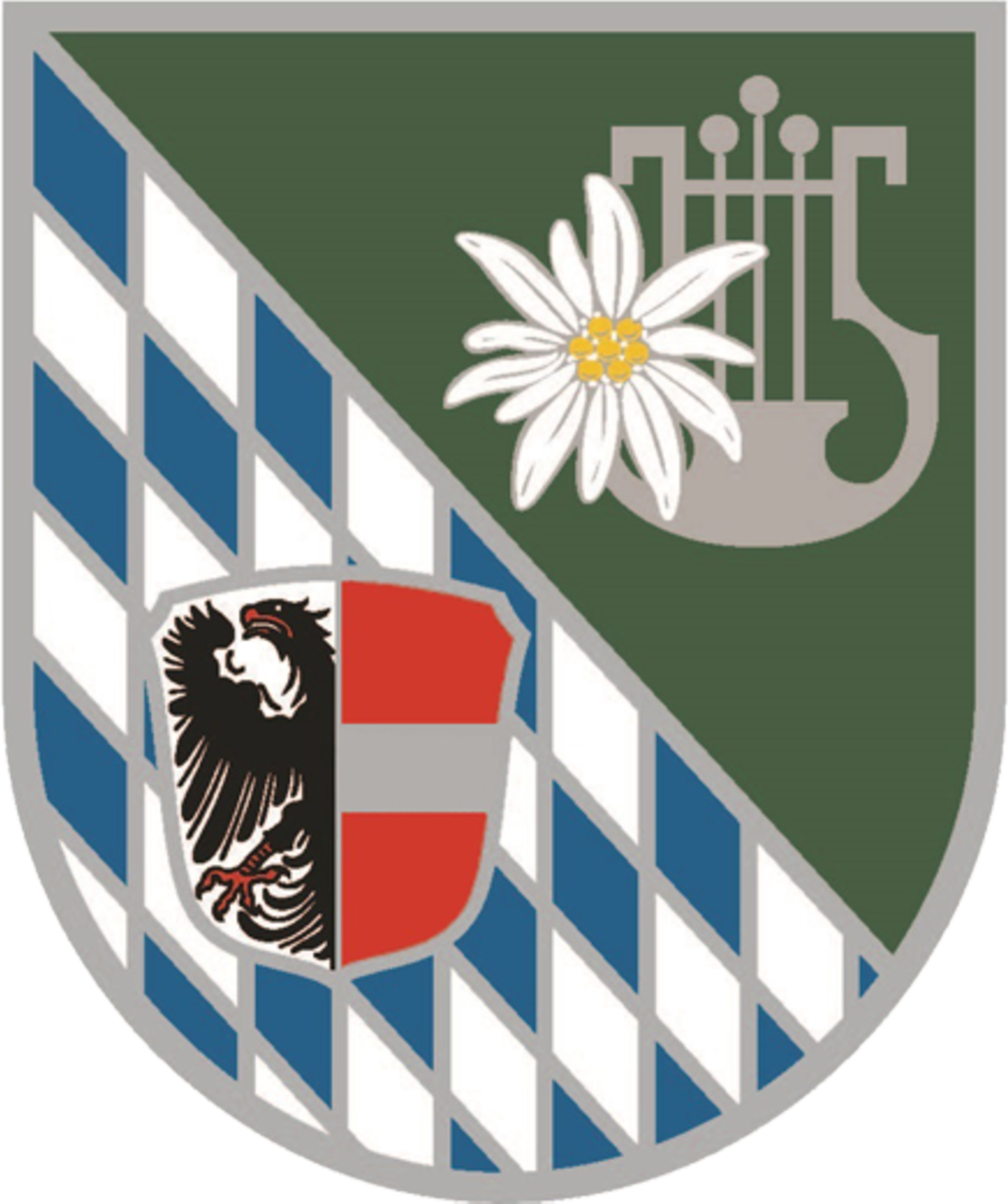
- Active: 1 July 1956; 69 years ago
- Country: Germany
- Branch: Bundeswehr
- Type: Military Band
- Size: 60
- Part of: Joint Support Service
- Garrison/HQ: Garmisch-Partenkirchen

Commanders
- Head Conductor: Major Rudolf Piehlmayer

The Mountain Band of the Bundeswehr (German: Gebirgsmusikkorps der Bundeswehr, GebMusKorpsB) is a military band in the German Bundeswehr. It is based in Garmisch-Partenkirchen, a mountain resort in Bavaria, southern Germany. It was originally established in 1956 as the band of the 1st Mountain Division in Sonthofen and is now associated with Military District IV. After being temporarily stationed in Munich and Mittenwald, it finally was permanently based in Garmisch-Partenkirchen in 1963.

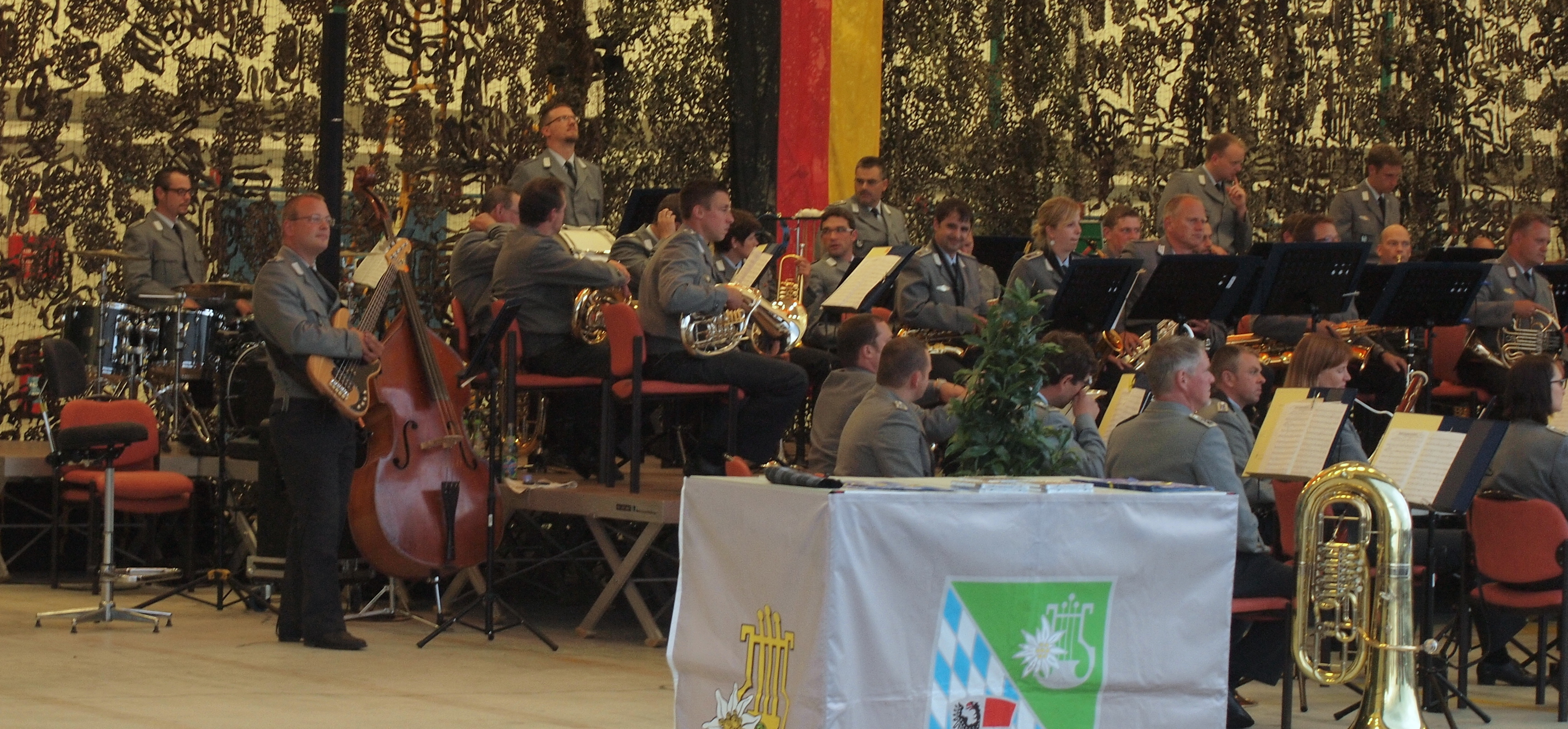
The band performing on 1 July 2014.

== Concert Band ==
The core of the band is the large symphonic concert band. It takes place part in approximately 160 missions per year, most of which primarily take place in the Bavarian region. It has also taken part in international military music festivals in Canada, the United States, Finland, Switzerland and the United Kingdom with other international missions in seeing it go to Kabul (Afghanistan and Termez (Uzbekistan). One of the most famous appearances of the band includes the participation in the 1972 Summer Olympics and the participation in military tattoos in Halifax in 1989 and 1998. In 2004, it visited Budapest as a German congratulatory event in honor of Hungary's entry into the European Union. In 2011, it took part in the Virginia International Tattoo and the Royal Edinburgh Military Tattoo. Folklore tunes can be heard from the Oberkrainer and brass section. The "Alphorngruppe", the "Hüttn-Musi" and the "Stubn Musi" provide typical Alpine music from within the band.

== Directors ==
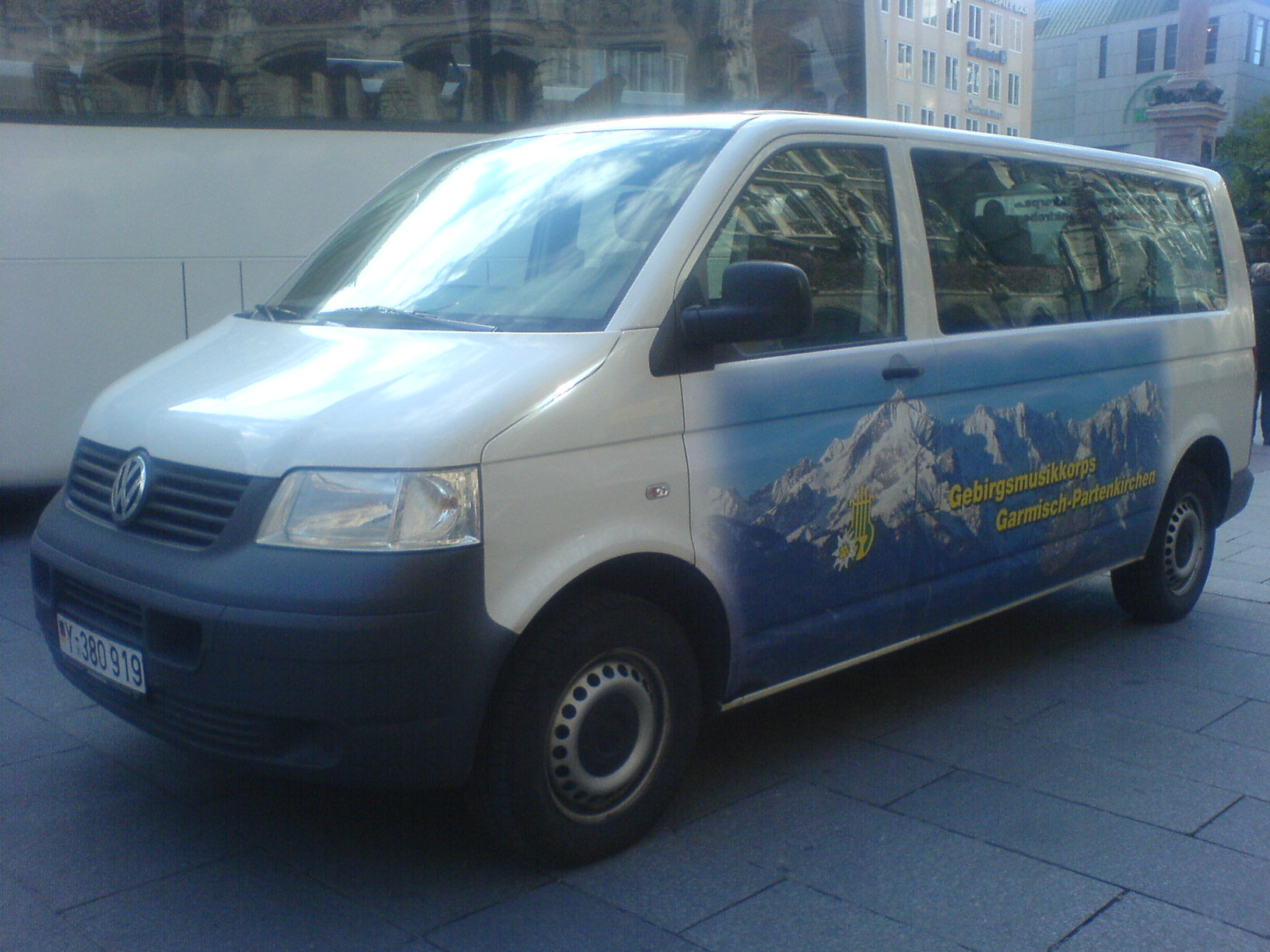
The official band van in October 2010.

Nine conductors have served as heads of the band:

- Hauptmann Adalbert Muhs (5 April-1 November 1956)
- Lieutenant Colonel Werner Zimmermann (1 November 1956 – 1 April 1978)
- Lieutenant Colonel Heinz Dieter Paul (1 April 1978 – 1 April 1987)
- Captain Christoph Lieder (1 April 1987 – 1 December 1992)
- Lieutenant Colonel Michael Euler (1 December 1992 – 1 October 2001)
- Lieutenant Colonel Christoph Scheibling (1 October 2001 – 1 April 2007)
- Lieutenant Colonel Martin Kötter (1 April 2007 – 26 March 2010)
- Lieutenant Colonel Christian Prchal (26 March 2010 – 20 May 2014)
- Lieutenant Colonel Karl Kriner (20 May 2014 - August 2022)
- Major Rudolf Piehlmayer (August 2022 as Reservist- Present)

== See also ==
- Military bands of the Bundeswehr
- Fanfare du 27e Bataillon de Chasseurs Alpin
- Italian Army Music Band
