= Militärischer Führungsrat =

The Militärischer Führungsrat (MFR, English: Military Leadership Council) is a German military body established in 1955 to discuss matters of fundamental importance to the Bundeswehr under the chairmanship of the Inspector General. Its aim is to reach a consensus across the armed forces as a basis for the Inspector General's military advice, although the Council does not possess formal decision-making authority. The council is located within the Federal Ministry of Defence. Its members include the Inspector General, his deputy, the inspectors general of the individual branches of the armed forces, the commander of the Bundeswehr Operational Command, and, depending on the topic, the commander of the Central Medical Services, who serves as the military medical advisor to the leadership of the Ministry of Defence. The Council may be expanded to include additional members at the discretion of the Inspector General. It is comparable to the Joint Chiefs of Staff.

== Composition ==
Position	Picture	Name	Flag
Inspector General of the Bundeswehr (chairman)	Generalinspekteur Carsten Breuer	General Carsten Breuer	
Deputy Inspector General of the Bundeswehr		Generaloberstabsarzt Nicole Schilling	
Inspector of the Army		Generalleutnant Christian Freuding	
Inspector of the Air Force		Generalleutnant Holger Neumann	
Inspector of the Navy		Vizeadmiral Jan Christian Kaack	
Inspector of the Cyber Force		Vizeadmiral Thomas Daum	
Commander of the Operational Command		Generalleutnant Alexander Sollfrank	
Commander of the Central Medical Services		Generaloberstabsarzt Ralf Hoffmann	

== History ==
The first Inspector General of the Bundeswehr, Adolf Heusinger, was appointed chairman of the newly established Military Leadership Council on November 22, 1955. This council was intended to serve as an advisory body to the civilian leadership of the newly formed Federal Ministry of Defense. Shortly thereafter, on December 8, 1955, the Military Leadership Council convened for its first meeting and from then on had the following tasks:

Its task was to study future warfare, with particular consideration of the use of nuclear weapons in the areas of overall warfare, tactical command, and the review and coordination of the tactical command regulations of the armed forces. Furthermore, it was to develop proposals for the deployment of the new West German armed forces for the defense of Western Europe and their integration into NATO structures. Within the scope of this work, it was also to consider and could address proposed changes to NATO's military system or provide opinions on such proposals. In addition, the organization, training, and operational readiness of the armed forces were to be planned and coordinated with the respective military departments. To establish a national defense, proposals were also to be made regarding the demands placed on the economy and transportation system of the young Federal Republic. This area also included the conceptualization of ground-based defense, its tasks, structure, and deployment, as well as personnel and equipment reinforcements. Finally, the Military Leadership Council addressed the planning of the training of future general staff officers, including proposals for their selection, training program, and subsequent deployment.

Following the reorganization of the military departments into command staffs, the members of the Military Leadership Council were the Inspector General of the Bundeswehr, the Inspectors General of the Armed Forces, and the Inspector General of the Medical and Health Services. The Deputy Inspector General also participated in the meetings of the Military Leadership Council.

The Military Leadership Council's position within the organization of the Ministry of Defense was initially only provisional. This was stipulated by Defense Minister Helmut Schmidt (SPD) in the "Blankenese Decree" of March 21, 1970. Three years later, on June 20, 1973, his successor, Georg Leber (SPD), decreed that the Deputy Inspector General would be a full member of the Military Leadership Council.

The Inspector General has always chaired the Military Leadership Council and also sets the agenda. Following the establishment of the Joint Support Service in 2000, the Inspector of the Joint Support Service, who was also the Second Deputy Inspector General, became a member of the Military Leadership Council. With the creation of the new military organizational area of Cyber and Information Domain on April 1, 2017, the Inspector of Cyber and Information Domain also became a member.

Most recently, the so-called "Osnabrück Decree" of 2024 defined the tasks and composition of the Military Leadership Council.
