= Operation Summer Rain (Cold War) =

- Part of Soviet–Afghan War and the Cold War
- Type: Covert operation
- Locations: Democratic Republic of Afghanistan; Hindu Kush
- Planned by: West Germany
- Commanded by: Helmut Schmidt (Chancellor of West Germany, until 1982); Helmut Kohl(Chancellor of West Germany from 1982); Hans-Georg Wieck (President of the Secret Services)
- Target: (Soviet Union) Soviet Armed Forces
- Date: 1981–1990 (9 years)
- Executed by: (West Germany) Federal Intelligence Service (BND) and the Special units of the German Armed Forces; Supported by: Afghan Mujhideens
- Outcome: Operation successful: Warsaw Pact weapons technology was captured
- Casualties: None

Operation Summer Rain (German: Operation Sommerregen), was a highly classified joint mission involving the Federal Intelligence Service (BND) and special units of the German Armed Forces during the Cold War-era Soviet–Afghan War in the 1980s. The primary objective of the operation was to gather intelligence on the weapons systems used by Soviet forces.

During the Cold War, the West, particularly the United States, aimed to contain Soviet influence in Afghanistan. Intelligence agencies pursued a strategy of supporting the Mujahideen by providing weapons, equipment, and training. This approach aimed to give the Soviet forces a costly experience while gaining insights into Soviet military technology.

== Background and approval ==
Operated under the utmost secrecy by the 16A department of the BND, responsible for the "Near and Middle East" region, Operation "Summer Rain" aimed to secure Soviet military technology deployed in Afghanistan. Notably, the Bundestag was not involved in the approval process, with the operation receiving the green light from the respective German governments.

=== Collaboration with Mujahideen Forces ===
BND agents from Pullach collaborated over several years with Afghan Mujahideen fighters, working together to obtain weaponry from the Soviet forces. The agents focused on acquiring a range of military assets, including new armor, ammunition types, night vision devices, and navigation technology used by the Soviet Red Army.

== Analysis and transportation of Soviet weaponry ==
The BND agents transported the acquired Soviet weaponry to Pakistan, where a container, cleverly disguised as a mobile medical station, served as the hub for analysis. The materials were meticulously examined, with a former BND employee recalling the X-ray assessments, particularly on the ammunition, to gauge its potential danger.

== Return to West Germany and testing ==
The Soviet weaponry was regularly transported back to Germany, where it underwent disassembly, testing, and further examination. Some of the Soviet ammunition reportedly found its way to military training grounds in Germany, where it was tested, including firing anti-tank ammunition at a Marder (infantry fighting vehicle), as recounted by an ex-BND agent.

=== Secrecy and controversies ===
The BND maintained a veil of secrecy around Operation "Summer Rain," with former BND President Hans-Georg Wieck confirming the agency's active involvement. The operation raises questions about the government's withholding of information and the extent to which it was used to support the Islamist resistance in Afghanistan during the Cold War. As the Taliban's power reemerges, calls for a comprehensive investigation into the BND's activities in Afghanistan from the 1980s to the present emphasize the need for both scientific and political scrutiny.
