= Einsatzführungskommando =

Badge of the headquarters

The Operational Command of the Bundeswehr (Einsatzführungskommando der Bundeswehr) (EinsFüKdoBw) in Schwielowsee (district Geltow) near Potsdam was a Bundeswehr headquarters responsible for operational missions that was directly subordinate to the Federal Ministry of Defence, and has been directly subordinate to the Inspector General of the Bundeswehr (armed forces chief) from April 1, 2012 to March 30, 2025. It was established in 2001 and was disbanded in 2025 when it and the Territorial Command (Territoriales Führungskommando, TerrFüKdoBw) were replaced by the newly established Operatives Führungskommando ((OpFüKdoBw) to which all functions of both commands were transferred.

== Mission ==
The EinsFüKdoBw basically plans and leads all foreign missions of the German armed forces - whether in a national or multinational context. During planning, the military mission and the forces and resources required for it are coordinated. Management includes uniform responsibility for personnel and material in the respective area of operation.

The EinsFüKdoBw is the operational command of the Bundeswehr and is the only department that issues national instructions to the contingent leaders in the operational areas. These usually receive their orders from multinational headquarters. The operational command ensures that the deployment of German forces is carried out in accordance with the mandate and that the legal norms of the Federal Republic of Germany are not violated. The commander of EinsFüKdoBw is responsible to the Inspector General of the Bundeswehr for the leadership of the operational forces subordinate to him.

The command was established on July 1, 2001. The staff of the disbanded IV Corps under the leadership of Brigadier General Bernd Hogrefe was used to build it up. A few weeks after its formation, it had its first major challenge due to the terrorist attacks of September 11. The command was given the leadership of the German contingents of Operation Enduring Freedom (OEF) and the International Security Assistance Force (ISAF). Elements of the Kommando Spezialkräfte were sent to Afghanistan working under command of Task Force K-Bar.

The special forces operations command (Kommando Führung Operationen von Spezialkräften), which was already based on site, was integrated into a new special operations department in April 2012 and assigned to the EinsFüKdoBw commander.

On May 11, 2017, the staff and telecommunications battalion was disbanded. Its tasks and personnel were partly taken over by the newly established headquarters.

The Bundeswehr's Territorial Command (de:Territoriale Führungskommando der Bundeswehr) has been leading domestic operations since September 2022.

== Missions ==
NATO missions and operations:

- Kosovo Force (KFOR) – protection troops in Kosovo – since June 1999
- Operation Active Endeavour (OAE) – terrorism prevention in the Mediterranean region – since November 2001
- NATO Support Aegean – Supporting the Greek and Turkish Coast Guards and Frontex in maritime surveillance – since February 2016

Missions and operations of the European Union:

- Operation Atalanta – combating piracy off the coast of Somalia – since December 2008
- EUCAP Nestor – training mission to build constitutional structures and combat piracy in the Horn of Africa – since August 2012
- EUTM Mali – Training mission in Mali – since April 2013
- EUTM Somalia – basic military training of Somali security forces – since April 2014
- EUFOR RCA – European Union military mission in the Central African Republic – since April 2014
- EU NAVFOR Med European Union military mission to prevent human trafficking and crime in the Mediterranean - since June 2015

Missions and operations of the United Nations:

- United Nations Assistance Mission in Afghanistan – United Nations support mission for the government of Afghanistan in establishing and expanding constitutional structures – since March 2002
- United Nations Interim Force in Lebanon - monitoring the coast of Lebanon - since October 2006
- UNMISS – Peacekeeping in South Sudan – since July 2011
- United Nations Mission for the Referendum in Western Sahara (MINURSO) - observer mission of the United Nations in Western Sahara - since October 2013

Former missions

- United Nations Multidimensional Integrated Stabilization Mission in Mali (MINUSMA) – conflict resolution mission in Mali – July 2013 - 2023
- UNAMID – conflict resolution in the Darfur region in Sudan – since November 2012
- Operation Active Fence - January 2013 - November 2015

== Commanders ==
Commander
No.	Name	from	until	Remark
7	Lieutenant General Bernd Schütt	2021-12-16	2025-04-09	Command disestablished
6	Lieutenant General Erich Pfeffer	2015-11-04	2021-12-16	
5	Lieutenant General Hans-Werner Fritz	2013-04-23	2015-11-04	
4	Rainer Glatz, Leutnant General	2009-04-22	2013-04-23	
3	Karlheinz Viereck, Leutnant General	2006-03-16	2009-04-22	
2	Holger Kammerhoff, Leutnant General	2004-09-01	2006-03-16	
1	Friedrich Riechmann, General	2001-07-01	2004-09-01	
