= Fo(u)r Peace Central Europe =

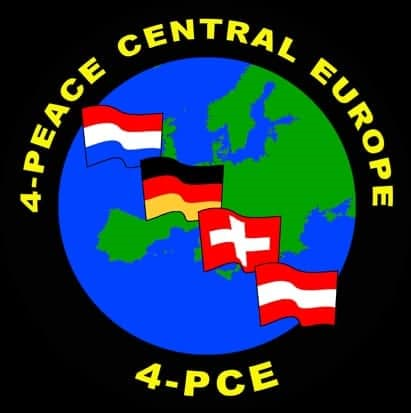
The common 4 PCE logo

Fo(u)r Peace Central Europe, occasionally, especially in informal correspondence, on logos, patches or similar 4 Peace Central Europe or 4-PCE or 4PCE (pronounced fōr-pī-cī-ī) refers to a military cooperation between military training centers in Germany, the Netherlands, Switzerland and Austria. The stylisation is supposed to unite two things in one term: both the statement that there are four nations and that they act for peace in Central Europe or shoulder to shoulder from Central Europe for world peace (in which the four nations, the Netherlands in a broader sense, geographically and culturally are). The exercise and training centers are the:

- United Nations Training Center of the Bundeswehr
- Austrian Armed Forces International Centre (AUTINT
- Dutch School "for Peace Operations" (NLD SPO)
- Swiss training Centre "International Command" (TC SWISSINT)

In principle, this quadrilateral cooperation encompasses all areas of training offered by the above-mentioned centres, but the focus is on the cooperation in carrying out the "Military Expert on Mission" (UNMEoM) course for officers that qualifies them to military observers.

== Cooperation in the course "military expert on mission" (unmeom) ==
The UNMEoM (formerly or in some countries even still called "United Nations Military Observer Course", UNMOC) is basically a three-week course that is standardized by UN standards. Training centers, such as those in the 4-PCE network, can have this course certified by the responsible Department for Peace Operations (DPO / ITS). A prerequisite is a transparent, modern and up-to-date implementation of the training that is absolutely identical to the specifications. The course at the German UN training center was certified for the first time in 2007 by the responsible Department for Peace Operations (DPO) of the UN, the SWISSINT course was certified for the first time in 2008. This is the case with all four training centers mentioned. Course participants are usual officers from senior lieutenant to major in principle from all member nations of the United Nations that have armed forces. The UNMEoM initially includes theoretical parts and practical training at the respective location and then concludes with a so-called "Blue Flag" exercise. The cooperation between the four partner nations is beneficial to everyone through synergy effects, since, for example, the respective assignment of trainers also promotes the exchange of experience and knowledge and the resource personnel is used more efficiently. In addition, the courses gain internationality and authenticity through trainers with individual and concrete UN experience.

== Development of cooperation ==
The military cooperation between the training centers began, initially with purely bilateral agreements, in 1993 and initially mainly involved the exchange of instructors. This was particularly important for the German Forces, since Germany, unlike the other armies mentioned in the Cold War phase, was unable to gain direct operational experience from the United Nations through the provision of military observers. Over the years, this has developed into a quadrilateral cooperation agreement. As a platform for coordination, a Commanders´ Conference (CC) with the four commandants / commanders takes place every six months, and in preparation for these a so-called Chief Instructure Meeting (CIM) with the four training managers, alternating between one of the four Partner countries instead. In the meantime, in order and following the law of the number "4", it has become established that in "odd" years the CC and the CIM take place in spring in Austria and in autumn in the Netherlands, in "even" years in spring in Switzerland and autumn in Germany. Cooperation between UN training centers is not unusual. However the way of this in the 4-PCE partner nations, with a timed MEoM course in the respective country and subsequent joint final exercise, is unique worldwide.
