= German special forces =

Special forces units of Germany

The German special forces include the Special Operations Forces (Kommando Spezialkräfte, KSK) of the German Army and the Naval Special Forces Command (Kommando Spezialkräfte der Marine, KSM) of the German Navy. Both are regular units and fully integrated into the branches of the German Armed Forces (Bundeswehr).

During operations, special forces personnel are under the command of the special operations division of the Einsatzführungskommando der Bundeswehr (Armed Forces Operations Command) in Potsdam, a branch of the Joint Support Service (Streitkräftebasis).

Besides the KSK and KSM, numerous specialized units can support special forces operations.

== Special Forces ==
=== Army Special Forces ===
A large majority of German special forces are part of the Kommando Spezialkräfte (KSK). The unit was founded in 1996 to adapt Germany's response to new offensive tasks, including the development of crisis response forces. Until then, the German Armed Forces (Bundeswehr) primarily served as a territorial defence force, in line with its self-image and primary orientation.

The specific reason for the establishment of the Kommando Spezialkräfte (KSK) was the evacuation of German citizens by Belgian Para-Commandos during the Rwandan genocide in 1994. This task was carried out by special forces of the Para-Commando Brigade from Belgium, the former colonial power, as agreed upon in advance by NATO partners. The German government chose not to intervene directly because neither the Federal Border Protection (Bundesgrenzschutz) GSG 9 unit, established in 1972 after the Munich Massacre, nor the German Army Paratrooper Companies B1 (Commando) were trained for guerrilla warfare situations. Additionally, the necessary technical means for transporting and carrying out the task were lacking.

The KSK is a brigade-level unit that is stationed in Calw, Baden-Württemberg. The unit is under the command of the Rapid Response Forces Division (Division Schnelle Kräfte) and is made up of around 1,500 soldiers. Most of them serve in the support forces department.

- Kommando Spezialkräfte
  - HQ KSK
    - Psychological Service
    - Language Service
  - Force Development Group
  - Operational Forces
    - 1st Commando Company
    - 3rd Commando Company
    - 4th Commando Company
    - Special Commando Company
    - Training Centre
  - Support Forces
    - HQ & Support Company
    - Signal Company
    - Support Company
    - Medical Centre

=== Naval Special Forces ===
The Kommando Spezialkräfte Marine (KSM) was founded in 2014 and was based upon the Commando Frogmen Company (Kampfschwimmerkompanie), one of Germany's oldest special operations units. The KSM is based in Eckernförde and is part of the 1st Flotilla (Einsatzflottille 1) in Kiel.

- Kommando Spezialkräfte Marine
  - HQ KSM
    - S1 - Personnel
    - S2/6 - Intelligence/Communications
    - S3 - Operations
    - S4 - Logistics
      - Operations Support Team Air (Einsatzgruppe Luft)
      - Diver Depot
      - Vehicle Repair Squad
    - Analysis & Development Group
    - Special Operation Medical Support Team (SOMST)
  - Commando Frogmen Company
    - Commando Frogmen Teams (Kampfschwimmereinsatzteams, KSET)
    - Operations Support Team Sea (Einsatzgruppe See)
  - Tactics and Training Group (Gruppe Grundlagen, Verfahren, Taktik und Ausbildung, GVTA)

=== Special Forces Aviation ===
The KSK is currently supported by the German Army Aviation Corps and - since the reorientation of the Bundeswehr in 2010 - by the helicopter force of the German Air Force. In 2015, the KSK got its aviation component made up of 15 EC645 T2 utility helicopters. They will be part of the Helicopter Wing 64 at the Holzdorf Air Base.

The KSM is supported by the Naval Air Wing 5 in Nordholz which operates the Westland Lynx and NH90.

== Specialized Forces ==
=== Special Operations Training Centre ===
Originally established in 1979 as an international school for long-range reconnaissance patrol team, the Ausbildungszentrum Spezielle Operationen is responsible for the initial and further training of special and specialized forces. The centre has the size of a regiment, is subordinate to Army Training Commando and based in Pfullendorf.

=== Specialized Forces Army ===
To close the gap between the KSK and regular infantry, the German Army developed a concept of specialized forces (Specialized Forces of the Army with Expanded Basic Qualifications for Special Operations, EGB - Spezialierte Kräfte des Heeres mit erweiteter Grundgefähigung für spezielle Operationen, EGB). This includes numerous army SOF units, mostly airborne forces. A distinction is made between the main operational forces and support forces. All of them are independent units respectively part of regular formations.

In 2013, the operational forces consisted of:

- 4 x Fallschirmjäger Commando companies with each 4 platoons
- 4 x Fallschirmjäger pathfinder platoons
- 1 x Long Range Reconnaissance Patrol Company
- 2 x airborne engineer platoons
- 2 x HUMINT HQ Squads
- 4 x HUMINT Squads

The support force is made up of:

- 2 x airborne reconnaissance companies
- 4 x K9 platoons of the Fallschirmjäger
- 4 x Fallschirmjäger Joint Fire Support Coordination Teams
- 4 x Fallschirmjäger Joint Fire Support Teams
- 1 x electronic warfare platoon
- several units, e.g. medics and PSYOPS

=== Fleet Protection Forces ===
From 1997 until spring 2014, both naval special forces (commando frogmen) and naval specialized forces (mine clearance divers and boarding trained naval infantrymen) were organized into the Naval Specialized Deployment Forces, a battalion-sized unit with four companies. The idea was to combine all specialized skills into one single formation. In the beginning, it was planned to create a force protection company beside the Boarding Company to support the operations of the commando frogmen.

Through the reorientation of the Bundeswehr, the commando frogmen got their battalion while naval infantry (including HUMINT experts) and mine clearance divers were summarized into the Naval Force Protection Battalion (Seebataillon) in Eckernförde. The formation is often described as the "multi-tool of the German Navy". So, the battalion can support special forces operations.

=== Counter-Terrorism ===
GSG 9 der Bundespolizei (GSG 9 of the Federal Police), formerly Grenzschutzgruppe 9 or GSG 9 (Border Protection Group 9) of the Federal Border Protection (Bundesgrenzschutz) from 1972 to 2005, has continued to be the specialized police tactical unit of the German Federal Police for counter-terrorism since 2005. Established as a counter-terrorism unit by the Bundesgrenzschutz in 1972 following the Munich Massacre, the GSG 9 served as a model for the formation and alignment of the Kommando Spezialkräfte (KSK) in 1996.

Their counterpart at the state police level (Landespolizei) is the Spezialeinsatzkommandos (SEK).

== Historical ==
The Brandenburgers were a special forces unit of Nazi Germany's Wehrmacht during World War II. Formed in 1939, they were initially part of the Abwehr, the military intelligence service. The unit was created by Theodor von Hippel, who envisioned small, highly trained groups capable of sabotage and infiltration behind enemy lines.

The Brandenburgers were known for their ability to blend in with local populations, often using their proficiency in foreign languages and knowledge of local customs to carry out their missions. They operated in various theatres, including Eastern Europe, North Africa, and the Middle East.
