= Commando Companies (Germany) =

Fallschirmjägerkompanien B1 (Paratrooper Companies B1)
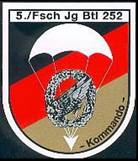
- Uniform patch of the 252nd Paratrooper Battalion (Commando)
- Active: 1989 (Provisional basis); 1990 (Full establishment) – 1996
- Country: Germany
- Branch: German Army (Heer)
- Type: Commando
- Size: Company
- Garrison/HQ: Nagold, Lebach, Iserlohn, and Varel

Insignia
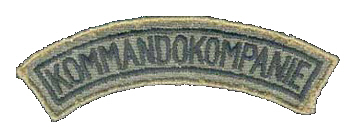
- Unit identification tab

The Fallschirmjägerkompanien B1 (English: Paratrooper Companies B1), also known as Kommandokompanien (Commando Companies), were specially trained paratrooper commando units of the German Army (Heer) and served as the predecessors of the German Army's current special operations unit, the Kommando Spezialkräfte (KSK).

== History ==
In 1989, the German Army (Heer) began planning the establishment of specialised airborne commando units capable of conducting isolated operations against high‑value military targets.

In 1992, each of the three Army corps was assigned one Commando Company through its airborne brigade. These were:

- 5th Company / 252nd Paratrooper battalion in Nagold, assigned to Airborne Brigade LLBrig 25
- 5th Company / 261st Paratrooper battalion in Lebach, assigned to Airborne Brigade LLBrig 26
- 5th Company / 271st Paratrooper battalion in Iserlohn, assigned to Airborne Brigade LLBrig 27 (dissolved in 1993)

After the dissolution of 5./271 in 1993, the following company took over its role:

- 5th Company / 313th Paratrooper battalion in Varel, assigned to Airborne Brigade LLBrig 31 (replaced 5./271 as the third Commando Company)

In 1996, all existing Commando Companies were dissolved and merged into the newly established Kommando Spezialkräfte (KSK), together with the Fernspählehrkompanie 100 and Fernspählehrkompanie 300 (Long Range Reconnaissance Patrol Companies), among others.

== Mission and training ==
The mission of Paratrooper Companies B1 Commando was to operate independently—either as single commando teams or grouped together—throughout the entire area of responsibility and interest of a corps, conducting commando operations against targets of operational significance. Specifically, this included:

- Direct combat operations, including independent commando missions in enemy rear areas aimed at eliminating targets of operational significance such as command posts, communications nodes, and supply facilities
- Sabotage of bridges and other logistical routes
- Long‑range reconnaissance
- Destruction of air‑defence systems and area‑effect weapons

Following advanced training conducted in close cooperation with American and British special forces and with GSG 9 of the former Federal Border Guard (Bundesgrenzschutz, BGS), the mission profile of the commando companies was expanded to include:

- Evacuation and extraction of German citizens abroad
- Counter‑terrorism
- Hostage rescue
- Crisis and conflict management

This advanced training occurred between 1994 and 1996, before the commando companies were dissolved and integrated into the newly formed KSK.

== Equipment ==
The equipment of the Commando Companies consisted mainly of the standard equipment of the German Army of that time. Firearms included:

- Walther P1 or Heckler & Koch P8 pistol
- Uzi MP2A1 submachine gun (with folding metal stock)
- Heckler & Koch G3A4 rifle (with retractable stock)
- Heckler & Koch G3A3ZF sniper rifle (later also the G22)
- MG 3 machine gun
- Heckler & Koch HK69A1 40 mm grenade pistol (GP)

In addition, the following special weapons were available:

- MP5A3, MP5SD3, MP5K submachine guns (Heckler & Koch MP5 family)
- HK53 assault rifle
- PSG1, MSG90, and Remington M24 sniper rifles
- HK21 (G8) machine gun
- Mossberg 590 and Remington 870 shotguns

In addition to Bundeswehr and NATO weapons, foreign weapons from Warsaw Pact states—such as the AK-47 and AK-74, Wieger StG-940, Dragunov sniper rifle, Skorpion, Makarov, and their variants—were also fielded, particularly after German reunification, when former East German (National People's Army, NVA) weapons stocks became available.

== Insignia ==
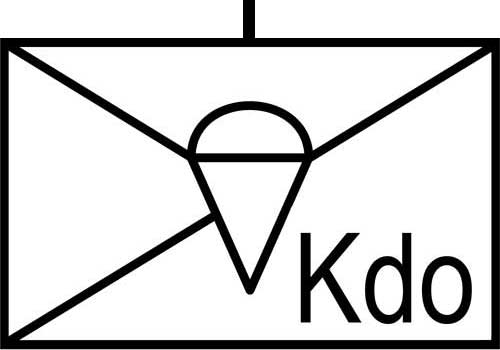
NATO joint military symbol of the Paratrooper Commando Companies B1

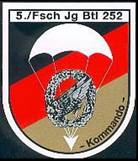
Internal unit insignia of the Commando Company, Paratrooper Battalion 252

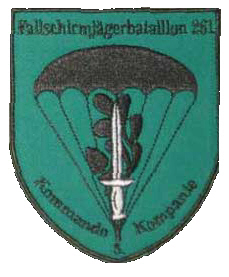
Internal unit insignia of the Commando Company, Paratrooper Battalion 261

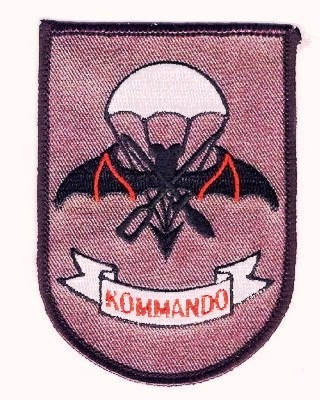
Internal unit insignia of the Commando Company, Paratrooper Battalion 271

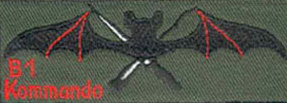
Internal unit insignia of the Commando Company, Paratrooper Battalion 313
