= Tanja Kreil =

German electrician

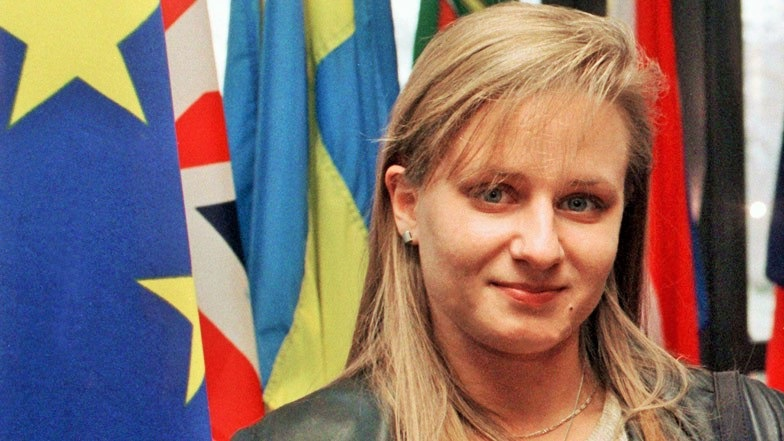
Tanja Kreil

Tanja Kreil (born 1977) is a German electronic engineer notable for filing a lawsuit against the German government that resulted in the German military opening up all trades to women. Previously, women were only permitted to serve in the medical and music corps on a voluntary basis.

Following the ruling, the German government removed the limitations on trades for women serving, and by 2001 the first female volunteers were undergoing training. However, Tanja Kreil did not join the armed forces after winning the lawsuit.

Unlike men, after the ruling women were still not subject to conscription, which did not go into abeyance until 2011.

== See also ==
- Conscription in Germany
