= Verena von Weymarn =

German general

Verena Merethe von Weymarn (born July 16, 1943, in Riga, Latvia) is a retired German medical officer and the first woman in German military history ever to be promoted to general officer rank.

== Early life ==
She was born Verena von Stritzky, daughter of historian Karl-Christoph von Stritzky and his wife. Her father died in the German invasion of the Soviet Union prior to her birth. After the end of World War II she grew up in Germany and studied medicine at Göttingen and Munich universities from 1964 to 1971.

== Military career ==
Von Weymarn became a medical officer in the Luftwaffe in September 1976 and served in the Bundeswehr for more than twenty years, receiving special training at San Antonio, Texas airforce base and NATO college in Rome. She became Generalarzt der Luftwaffe ("Surgeon General of the Air Force") in Siegburg-Heide, North Rhine-Westphalia on March 23, 1994, being the first woman ever to reach the rank of general in the armed forces of Germany.

Von Weymarn retired from service on August 1, 2004.

== Personal life ==
She is the widow of the Baltic German architect Alexander von Weymarn (1920–1998).
