= Bundeswehr Operational Command =

- Operatives Führungskommando der Bundeswehr
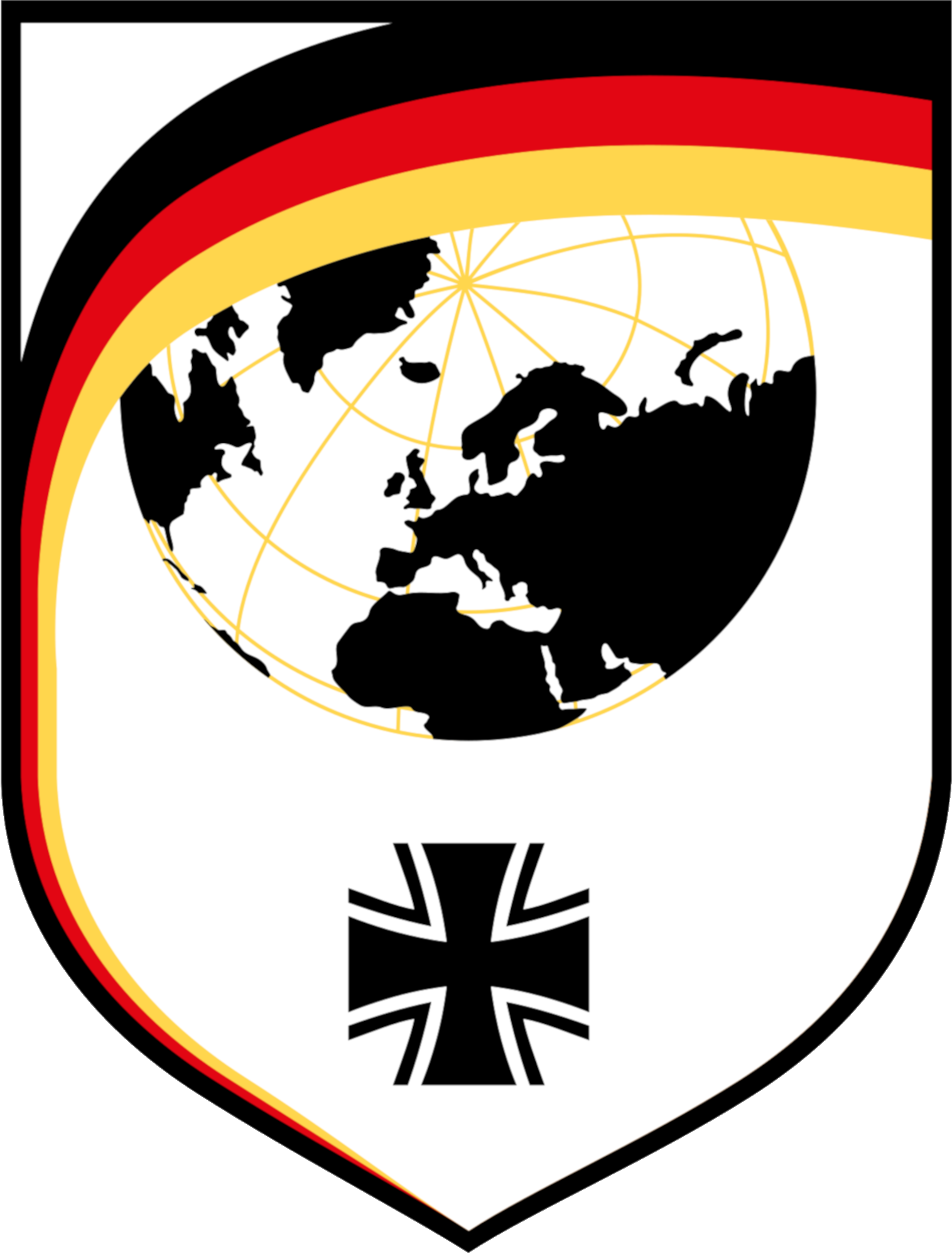
- Active: 1 April 2025
- Country: Germany
- Branch: Bundeswehr
- Type: High command
- Garrison/HQ: Julius Leber Barracks

Commanders
- Current commander: Lieutenant general Alexander Sollfrank

The Bundeswehr Operational Command (German: Operatives Führungskommando der Bundeswehr) (known in it acronym OpFüKdoBw) is a higher command authority of the Bundeswehr. The command was established on October 1, 2024, primarily by merging the Bundeswehr Territorial Command and the Bundeswehr Operations Command. It is stationed in at the Julius Leber Barracks in Berlin and Schwielowsee (Henning von Tresckow Barracks). The command reached full operational readiness by April 1, 2025, and will comprise 1,400 positions. Its commander is Lieutenant General Alexander Sollfrank, and its deputy is Lieutenant General André Bodemann.

== History ==
The establishment of the Bundeswehr Operational Command was officially announced by Federal Minister of Defense Boris Pistorius on April 4, 2024. The roll call took place on April 9, 2025, in the presence of Federal Minister of Defense Boris Pistorius, President of the Federal Council Anke Rehlinger, and Inspector General of the Bundeswehr Carsten Breuer at the Julius Leber Barracks in Berlin.

== Unit Badge ==
The unit badge of the Bundeswehr Operational Command symbolically unites the two agencies that were involved in establishing the command. The black, red, and gold ribbon underscores the soldiers' oath of service to loyally serve the Federal Republic of Germany and bravely defend the freedom of the German people. It symbolizes the Bundeswehr's identity: We serve Germany. At the same time, it embodies the territorial responsibilities of protecting the country. With a view to Europe and the NATO countries, the stylized globe represents the core mission of the Operational Command as the primary interface with NATO and the European Union. The unifying element is the Iron Cross, which, as the national emblem of the German armed forces, stands for bravery, love of freedom, and chivalry.

== Position within the armed forces ==
The Osnabrück Decree, which came into force on May 1, 2024, regulates the mission and position of the Operational Command. Accordingly, once established, the command is capable and tasked with carrying out the "national operational planning and command" of the armed forces. The command prioritizes the deployed forces and allocates necessary support forces, while the services retain responsibility for tactical command. Based on its planning, support forces such as medical, logistics, NBC defense, or military police are assigned to the services. At the same time, it is "a single point of contact for the armed forces for national authorities at the federal and state levels, international partners, and multinational actors." This establishment is intended to "systematically separate the strategic, operational, and tactical levels from one another."

Within the scope of the "special area of responsibility of operational planning and operational command," the Commander of the Bundeswehr Operational Command is "superior to the inspectors of the services as well as the responsible commanders and commanders in the area of the Bundeswehr Support Command" according to Section 3 of the Superiors Ordinance.

== Structure ==
The Bundeswehr Operational Command, which reports directly to the Ministry of Defense, has an internationally comparable J-structure. At the head of the command is the Commander, along with his deputy and the Chief of Staff. The Commander is also the National Territorial Commander.
