= United Nations Training Center of the Bundeswehr =

German training centre for UN military operations

Coordinates: 50°05′26″N 9°54′08″E

- Insignia
- Active: 27 October 1999–present
- Country: Germany
- Branch: German Army
- Role: Specialist training
- Part of: Infantry School
- Headquarters: Hammelburg

The United Nations Training Center of the Bundeswehr (German: Vereinte Nationen Ausbildungszentrum der Bundeswehr, VN AusbZ Bw) in Hammelburg was founded in October 1999 and is the training center of the Bundeswehr for preparing military and civilian personnel for UN operations within the framework of international conflict prevention and crisis management.
