= Cyber and Information Domain Service =

Electronic warfare branch of the German Armed Forces

Cyber and Information Domain Service (CIDS)
- Cyber- und Informationsraum (CIR)
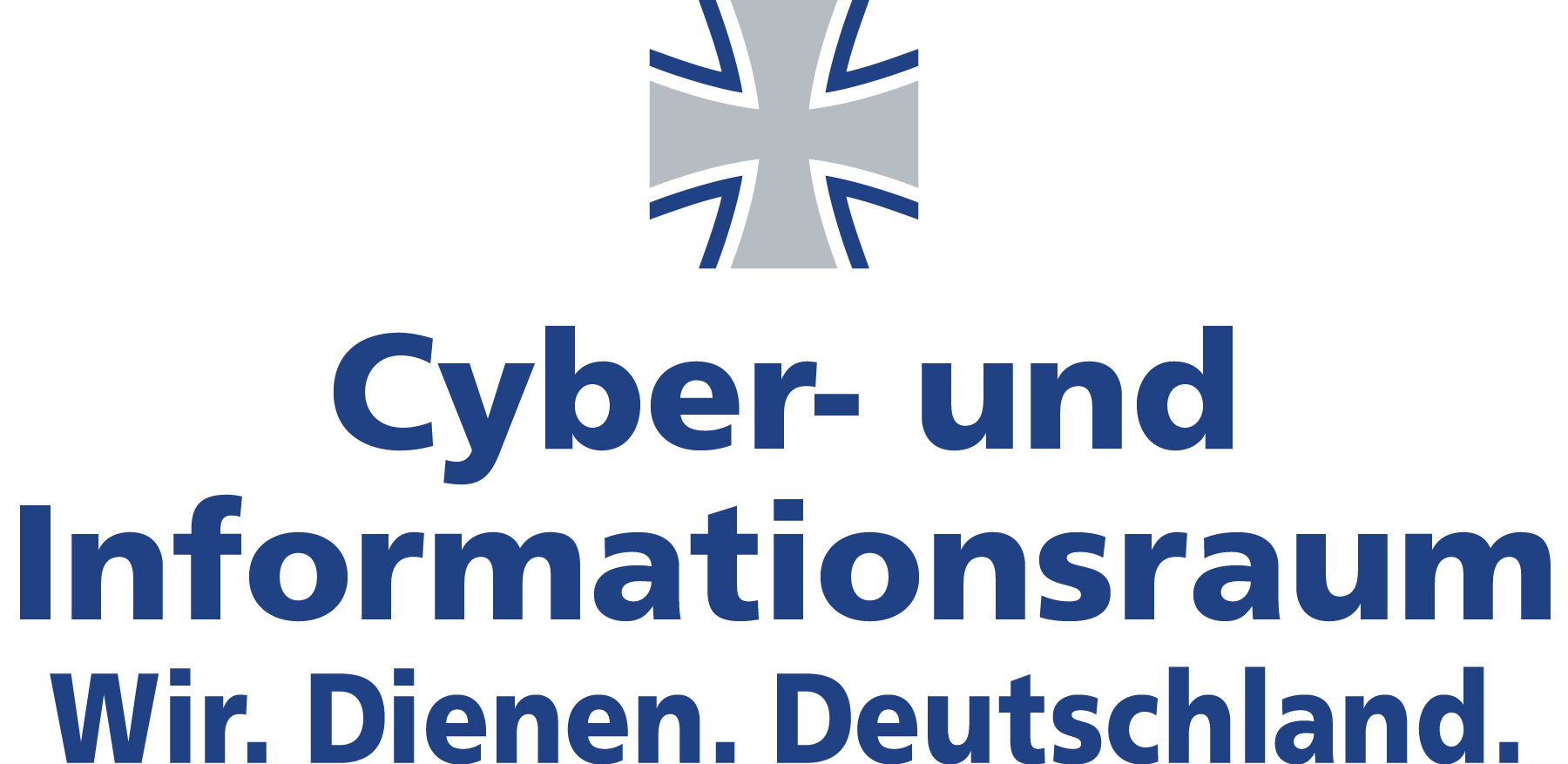
- Insignia
- Active: 1 April 2017 – present
- Country: Federal Republic of Germany
- Type: Signals and Electronic Warfare
- Size: 15,659 (June 2025)
- Garrison/HQ: Bonn
- March: Cyber-March
- Website: Official website

Commanders
- Inspector of CIR: Vice Admiral Thomas Daum
- Vice Inspector of CIR: Major General Jürgen Setzer

The Cyber and Information Domain Service (CIDS; German: Cyber- und Informationsraum, lit. 'Cyber and Information space', pronounced [ˈsaɪbɐ ʔʊnt ʔɪnfɔʁmaˈtsi̯oːnsʁaʊm]; CIR) is the youngest branch of the German Armed Forces, the Bundeswehr. The decision to form an organizational unit was presented by Defense Minister Ursula von der Leyen on 26 April 2016, becoming operational on 1 April 2017. It is headquartered in Bonn.

== History ==
In November 2015, the German Ministry of Defense activated a Staff Group within the ministry tasked with developing plans for a reorganization of the Cyber, IT, military intelligence, geo-information, and operative communication units of the Bundeswehr.

On 26 April 2016, Defense Minister Ursula von der Leyen presented the plans for the new military branch to the public and on 5 October 2016 the command's staff became operational as a department within the ministry of defense. On 1 April 2017, the Cyber and Information Domain Service (CIDS) was activated as a "military organizational unit" (Organisationsbereich), indicating its status below a full service branch. The CIDS Headquarters took command of all existing electronic warfare (Fernmeldetruppe EloKa), signals (Fernmeldetruppe, FmTr and Truppe für Operative Kommunikation OpKom), IT, military intelligence, geoinformation (Geoinformationswesen, GeoInfo), and psychological operations units.

As part of a wider restructuring of higher command in the Bundeswehr in 2024, it was decided to upgrade it from a military organizational unit to the fourth full military service branch, alongside Heer (army), Luftwaffe (air force) and Deutsche Marine (navy).

Since 2025, the CIR has been establishing its own small, company-sized drone unit. This unit is intended to support the CIR specific reconnaissance and protection tasks. The initial personnel are stationed with the Electronic Warfare Battalion at the CIR’s Northern Intercept Center in Stadum (Schleswig-Holstein). There, experiments are being conducted regarding UAV jamming capabilities and hardening against jamming. UAVs are also being tested for use as UHF/VHF relay stations.

== Organisation ==
The CIDS is commanded by the Chief of the Cyber and Information Domain Service (Inspekteur des Cyber- und Informationsraum InspCIR), a three-star general position, based in Bonn. As of April 2023, it is structured as follows:

- Cyber and Information Domain Service Command (Kommando Cyber- und Informationsraum KdoCIR), in Bonn
  - Reconnaissance and Effects Command (Kommando Aufklärung und Wirkung KdoAufkl/Wirk), in Gelsdorf
    - 911th Electronic Warfare Battalion
    - 912th Electronic Warfare Battalion, mans the Oste-class SIGINT/ELINT and reconnaissance ships
    - 931st Electronic Warfare Battalion
    - 932nd Electronic Warfare Battalion, provides airborne troops for operations in enemy territory
    - Cyber-Operations Centre (Zentrum Cyber-Operationen ZSO)
    - Central Imaging Reconnaissance (Zentrale Abbildende Aufklärung ZAbbAufkl), operating the SAR-Lupe satellites
    - Central Bundeswehr Investigation Authority for Technical Reconnaissance (Zentrale Untersuchungsstelle der Bundeswehr für Technische Aufklärung ZU-StelleBwTAufkl)
    - Signals Reconnaissance Centre North (Fernmeldeaufklärungszentrale Nord FmAufklZentr NORD)
    - Signals Reconnaissance Centre South (Fernmeldeaufklärungszentrale Süd FmAufklZentr SÜD)
  - Information Technology Services Command (Kommando Informationstechnik-Services der Bundeswehr KdoIT-SBw), in Bonn
    - 281st Information Technology Battalion
    - 282nd Information Technology Battalion
    - 292nd Information Technology Battalion
    - 293rd Information Technology Battalion
    - 381st Information Technology Battalion
    - 383rd Information Technology Battalion
  - Bundeswehr Geoinformation Centre (Zentrum für Geoinformationswesen der Bundeswehr), in Euskirchen
  - Bundeswehr Cyber-Security Centre (Zentrum für Cyber-Sicherheit der Bundeswehr ZCSBw)
  - Bundeswehr Software Digitalisation Centre (Zentrum Digitalisierung der Bundeswehr und Fähigkeitsentwicklung Cyber- und Informationsraum ZDigBw)
  - Bundeswehr Operational Communications Centre (Zentrum Operative Kommunikation der Bundeswehr ZOpKomBw)
  - Training Centre CIDS (Ausbildungszentrum CIR AusbZ CIR)

== See also ==
- List of cyber warfare forces
