= Kommando Spezialkräfte =

German special forces command

Coordinates: 48°42′30″N 8°46′19″E

Special Operations Forces
- Kommando Spezialkräfte (KSK)
- KSK unit badge
- Active: 20 September 1996
- Country: Germany
- Branch: German Army
- Type: Unified combatant command
- Size: above 1,500
- Part of: Rapid Forces Division
- Garrison/HQ: Calw, Baden-Württemberg, Germany
- Mottos: Der Wille entscheidet; Facit Omnia Voluntas (“The will decides”)
- Engagements: Yugoslav Wars; NATO intervention in Bosnia; Kosovo War; Operation Enduring Freedom; War in Afghanistan; Battle of Tora Bora; TF K-Bar; Operation Anaconda; Northern Afghanistan; 2021 Kabul airlift
- Decorations: United States Navy Presidential Unit Citation (for service with Task Force K-Bar)
- Website: Bundeswehr: Special Operations Forces (Kommando Spezialkräfte)

Commanders
- Current commander: Brigadier General Alexander Krone

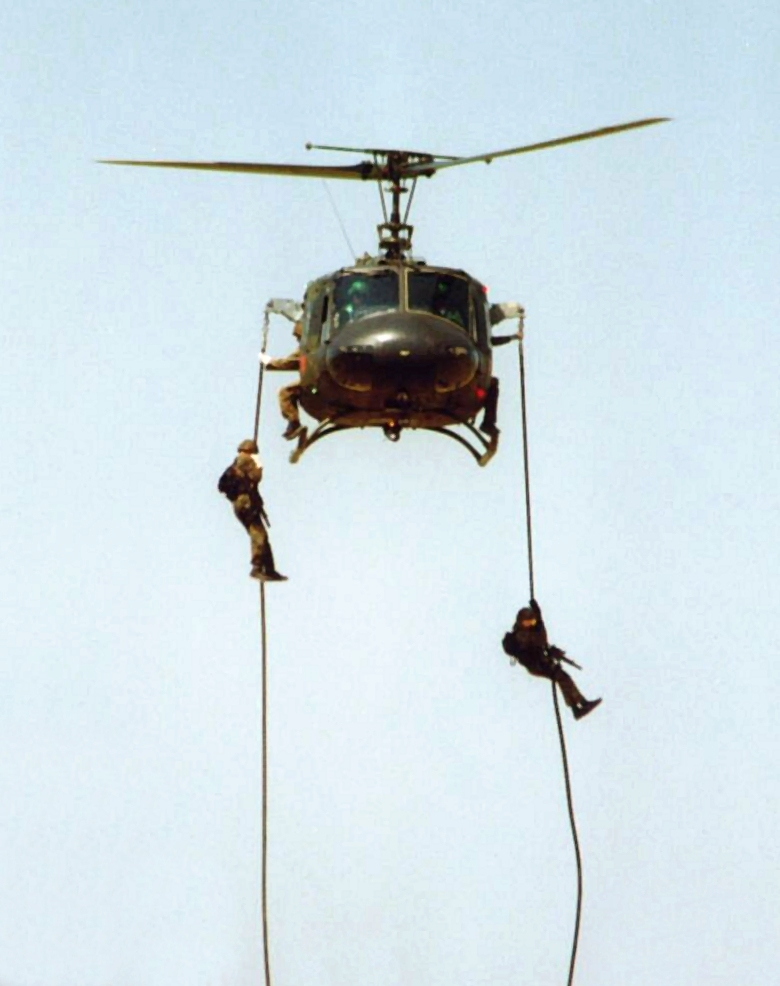
Heliborne training (2000 ILA Berlin Air Show)

The Kommando Spezialkräfte ('special operations forces', abbreviated to KSK in German) is the special forces command of the German Army (Heer).

Formed in 1996, it is a brigade-level unit responsible for covert operations, counterterrorism, hostage rescue, direct action, high-value target missions, irregular warfare, ISTAR, rapid response in military emergencies, and other special operations. The KSK is based at the Graf Zeppelin Barracks in Calw, Baden-Württemberg, and is subordinated to the Rapid Forces Division (Division Schnelle Kräfte, DSK).

The Special Air Service (SAS), the United States Special Operations Command (USSOCOM), and the German Federal Police's GSG 9 (Grenzschutzgruppe 9) of the former Federal Border Guard (Bundesgrenzschutz, BGS) served as models for the formation of the KSK.

The unit has received decorations and awards from NATO, the United States, and allied forces. KSK personnel have participated in joint counterterrorism operations, notably in the Balkans and the Middle East.

== History ==
From 1973 — when the Federal Republic of Germany (BRD) consisted only of West Germany — through reunification and until the establishment of the KSK in 1996, all counterterrorism, hostage-rescue crisis management, and other high‑risk special‑police operations were assigned to GSG 9 of the Federal Border Guard (Bundesgrenzschutz). Although a police formation, GSG 9 developed a distinctly paramilitary special‑operations profile, created in the aftermath of the Munich massacre during the 1972 Munich Olympic Games. Because the German Defence Forces (Bundeswehr) was constitutionally restricted from domestic intervention roles, these missions remained the responsibility of GSG 9, which also conducted overseas operations to protect German interests and respond to international hostage situations. The creation of the KSK added a dedicated military special‑operations (SOF) capability primarily intended for foreign deployments; like all Bundeswehr units, however, it may be employed domestically under the narrow constitutional conditions that permit military assistance to civilian authorities in extreme emergencies, without altering GSG 9's domestic mandate or its ability to operate abroad.

Before 1973, the army's Fernspählehrkompanie 200 (FSLK200) (Long Range Reconnaissance Patrol Company), the navy's Kampfschwimmer (KSM) (combat swimmers), and — until 1989 — the Special Weapons Escort Companies (Sonderwaffenbegleitkompanien) were the only military units comparable to anything that other nations may have regarded as dedicated special-forces units.

One political reason for the establishment of the KSK was the 1994 Rwandan genocide, during which German citizens had to be evacuated by the Belgian Para-Commando Brigade. This operation was carried out by special-operations forces of Belgium, the former colonial power, under arrangements previously agreed upon by NATO partners. The Federal Government of Germany chose not to intervene directly, judging that neither the Federal Border Guard's GSG 9 counterterrorism and hostage‑rescue unit nor the German Army's Paratrooper Commando Companies B1 possessed the specialized training, equipment, or deployable capability required for irregular‑warfare operations in an overseas crisis environment, and noting a lack of the necessary transport assets. Several Belgian soldiers were killed during the mission. The political pressure that followed made clear the need for Germany to field its own military forces capable of conducting special operations within NATO.

Following the KSK's activation on 20 September 1996, soldiers were primarily recruited from former members of the Paratrooper Commando Companies B1 of the airborne brigades. Although not structured or equipped for full‑scale irregular‑warfare missions abroad, these troops already possessed extensive training in air‑assault and airborne operations, commando‑style missions, long‑range penetration, counter‑irregular warfare, and other special‑operations tasks. After 1994, as the German Defence Forces (Bundeswehr) mandate expanded to include special‑operations tasks in overseas deployments — such as counterterrorism‑related missions, hostage‑rescue in crisis zones, and broader crisis‑management roles — these capabilities were developed and later integrated into the KSK during restructuring. Additional personnel from Fernspählehrkompanie 100 and 300 (Long Range Reconnaissance Patrol Companies), disbanded in 1996, also joined the KSK and remain regarded as the unit's most experienced members due to their veteran status.

Other soldiers came to the KSK from areas known as the Army's "green assignments", such as airborne forces (Fallschirmjäger), light infantry (Jäger), and mountain infantry (Gebirgsjäger). Specialists from other branches of the Bundeswehr were also occasionally recruited. The integration took place with new equipment adapted to the largely new operational profile of "crisis prevention and crisis management" and was supplemented by equipping the KSK with its command, communications, and support staff.

Like all German military units, KSK deployments require authorization from the German Bundestag (Federal Assembly). The unit has engaged in numerous anti-terror campaigns both in Europe and abroad; known engagements include operations inside Kosovo, Bosnia and Herzegovina, and most recently in Afghanistan.

During the War in Afghanistan, although nominally under Operation Enduring Freedom (OEF) command, the KSK worked under International Security Assistance Force (ISAF) command since 2005, carrying out numerous operations in the vicinity of the German deployment in Kabul, including a successful raid on an al-Qaeda safe house for suicide bombers in October 2006. KSK operators have commented in the German media about the restrictions placed on them by their national caveats and stated a preference for working directly for the Americans as part of Operation Enduring Freedom in Afghanistan (OEF-A) as they had done as part of Task Force K-Bar.

As is to be expected with such units, specific operational details such as success and casualty rates are considered to be top secret and withheld even from the highest-ranking members of the Bundestag. This practice has elicited some serious concerns, resulting in an agreement to increase both transparency and accountability, by disclosing mission details to selected members of the Bundestag, about the future deployments of KSK forces.

On 4 May 2013, the KSK reported its first casualty. First Sergeant Daniel Wirth was fatally shot in Baghlan Province, Afghanistan during operation "Maiwand". US Army forces were part of the attempted rescue mission.

In 2018, the German Federal Criminal Police Office uncovered a plot involving unknown KSK soldiers to murder prominent German politicians such as Claudia Roth, Heiko Maas and Joachim Gauck among others, and carry out attacks against immigrants living in Germany. Also, earlier that same year in a separate investigation, the State prosecutors in the city of Tübingen investigated whether neo-Nazi symbols were used at a "farewell" event involving members of KSK.

In June 2020, German defence minister Annegret Kramp-Karrenbauer announced that the unit would be partially disbanded due to growing far-right extremism within the ranks. The KSK had become partially independent from the chain of command, with a toxic leadership culture. One of the force's four companies where extremism is said to be the most rife was to be dissolved and not replaced.

In 2025, it was reported that the KSK is using the Multitarn camo pattern, a copy of the famous MultiCam pattern

== Commanders ==
- 1996–1998: Brigadier General Fred Schulz
- 1998–2000: Brigadier General Hans-Heinrich Dieter
- 2000–2003: Brigadier General Reinhard Günzel
- 2003–2005: Brigadier General Carl-Hubertus von Butler
- 2005–2007: Brigadier General Rainer Hartbrod
- 2007–2010: Brigadier General Hans-Christoph Ammon
- 2010–2013: Brigadier General Heinz Josef Feldmann
- 2013–2017: Brigadier General Dag Knut Baehr
- 2017–2018: Brigadier General Alexander Sollfrank
- 2018–2021: Brigadier General Markus Kreitmayr
- 2021–2024: Brigadier General Ansgar Meyer
- 2024–present: Brigadier General Alexander Krone

† Brigadier general Dag Baehr has previously served twice as a field officer in the KSK: First, under the command of Brigadier General Schulz, when it was founded from 1996 until 1999 and then again between 2004 until 2007 under the command of Brigadier General Hartbrod.

== Structure ==
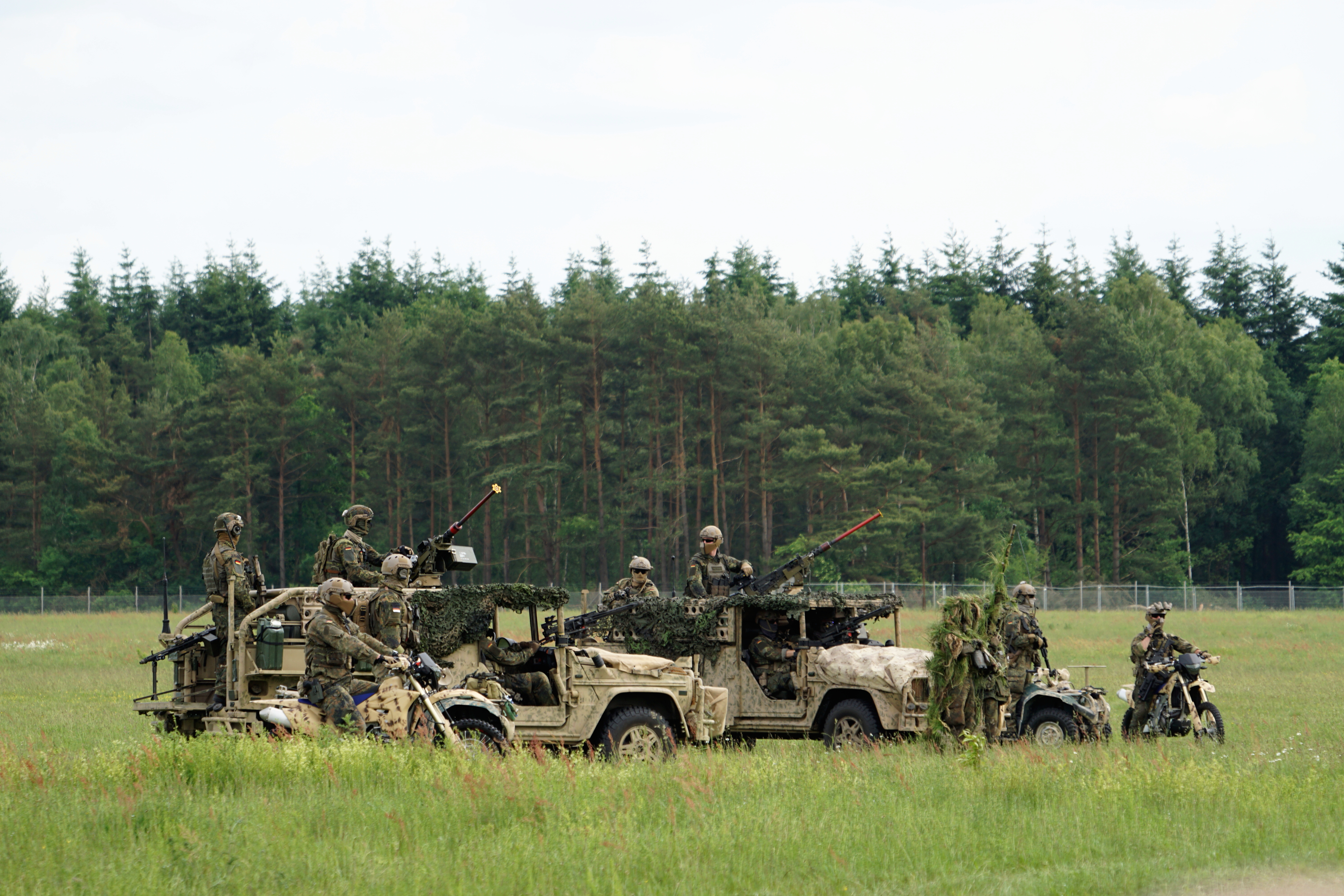
KSK land based training operations (2017)

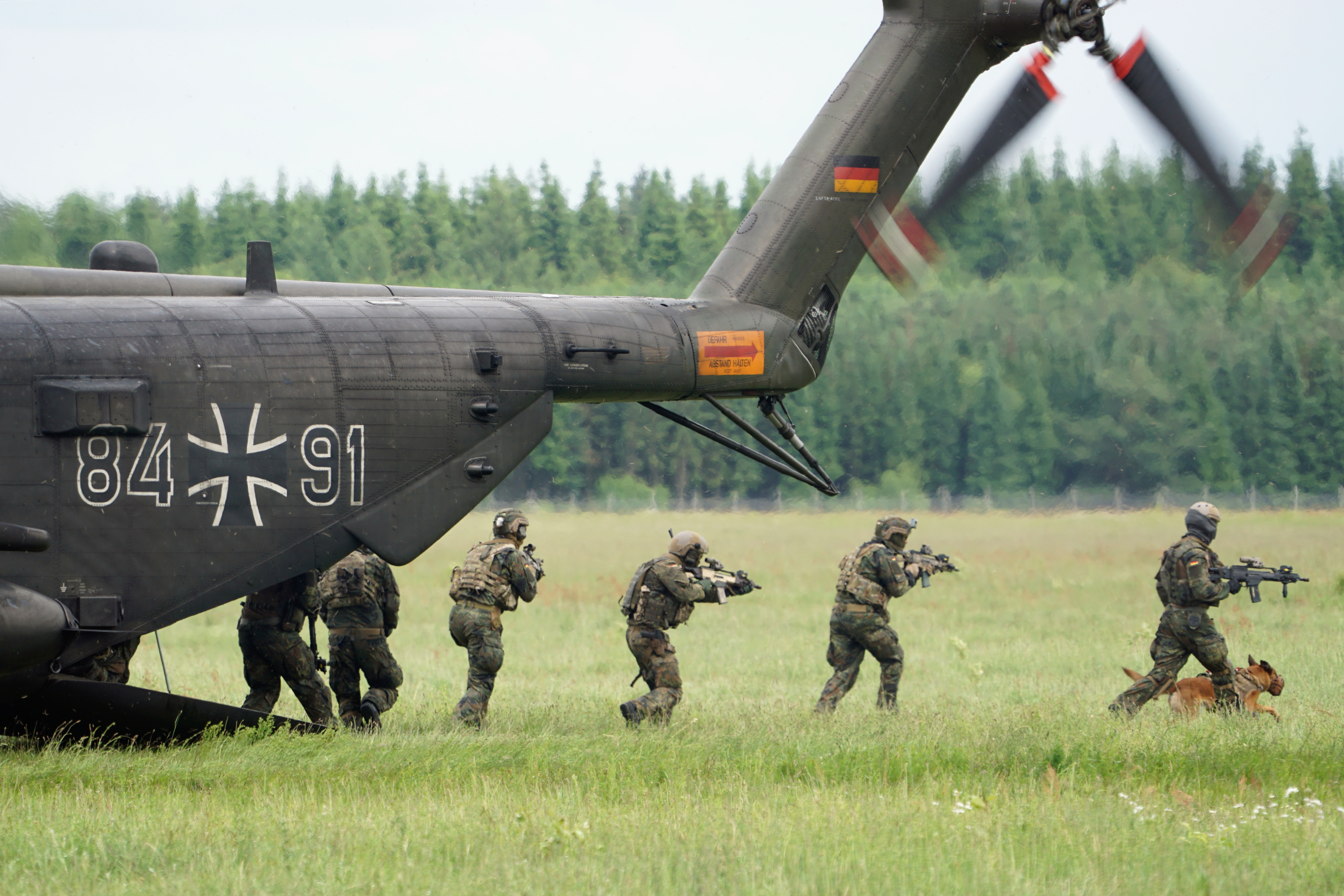
KSK air insertion training (2017)

The KSK is a brigade-level unit of the regular army divided into two battalion-sized departments Operational Forces and Support Forces and the HQ and the Development Group.

=== Organization ===
- Kommando Spezialkräfte
  - KSK Staff
    - Psychological Service
    - Language Service
  - Staff and Command Support Company
  - 1st Commando Company
  - 3rd Commando Company
  - 4th Commando Company
  - Special Commando Company
  - Special Reconnaissance Company
  - Signal Company
  - Support Company
    - Quartermaster/ Handling Platoon
    - Maintenance Platoon
    - Parachutes/ Air Handling Platoon
  - Medical Center
  - Training Department
  - Development Department

In 2020 the 2nd Commando Company was dissolved "after an accumulation of incidents and a notable build-up of right-wing extremists in the unit".

=== Operational forces ===
Combat-ready units are divided into three commando companies of approximately one hundred men. Each of the three commando companies has five specialized platoons, each with a unique specialty and ability that can be adapted to both the terrain and situation, depending on type action(s) required:

- Command Platoons
- 1st Platoon: vehicle insertion
- 2nd Platoon: airborne insertion
- 3rd Platoon: amphibious operations
- 4th Platoon: operations in special geographic or meteorological surroundings (desert, jungle, mountain, or arctic regions)
- 5th Platoon: reconnaissance, intelligence operations and sniper/counter-sniper operations

There are four commando squads in every platoon. Each of these squads consists of four equally skilled members who have been hand-picked from the German Army into the platoon that best suits their abilities. Each squad member is specially trained as a weapons expert, medic, combat engineer, or communications expert, respectively. Additionally, some groups may contain other specialists, such as heavy weapons or language experts.

=== Special Commando Company ===
The special commando company was established in 2004. This company is staffed with specially trained KSK personnel in the fields of Joint terminal attack controller, IED disposal or handling of military working dogs which may support operations of the commando companies as required. KSK personnel serving in the special commando company are commonly seasoned hands having previously served in one of the three commando companies.

=== Special Reconnaissance Company ===
The Special Reconnaissance Company is staffed with KSK members and further personnel specialised in reconnaissance. This company may support the operations of the three commando companies with reconnaissance and surveillance abilities, for instance with the use of UAVs. Female members may also operate as Female Engagement Teams if the task is required.

=== Support forces ===
The HQ & Support Company is responsible for supply duties in Germany. For that, the unit is made up of:

- HQ Platoon
- Material Platoon
- Supply Echelon
  - Catering Section
  - Transport Platoon
  - Ammunition and Refueling Platoon

The Signal Company consists of three signal platoons.

While the HQ & Support Company supports the KSK in Germany the Support Company takes supply duties during operations. Therefore, the company is organized in:

- Repair Platoon
- Supply Platoon
- Parachute Equipment Platoon

== Insignia ==
=== Beret and badge ===
Members of the KSK wear maroon berets as a symbol of their roots in airborne units. A metal badge is worn which consists of a sword surrounded by oak leaves. The flag of the Federal Republic of Germany is depicted on the bottom of the sword.

=== Kommandoabzeichen ===
The Kommandoabzeichen (commando badge) is a cloth patch worn on the right pouch of the uniform. The commando badge's design is similar to the metal badge worn on the beret. It depicts a silver sword on a light green background surrounded by oak leaves. The badge was permitted to be worn in 2000 by Federal President Johannes Rau.

=== Waffenfarbe ===
KSK units wear green as their Waffenfarbe, similar to infantry units. Before becoming an independent military force, the KSK was a part of infantry units.

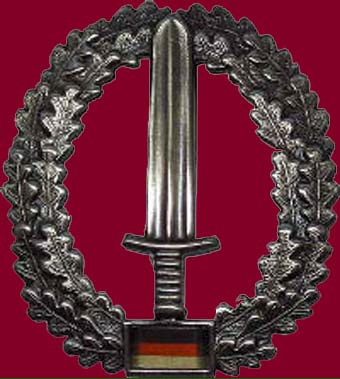
Badge worn on beret

Green Waffenfarbe worn by infantry units

== Selection and training ==
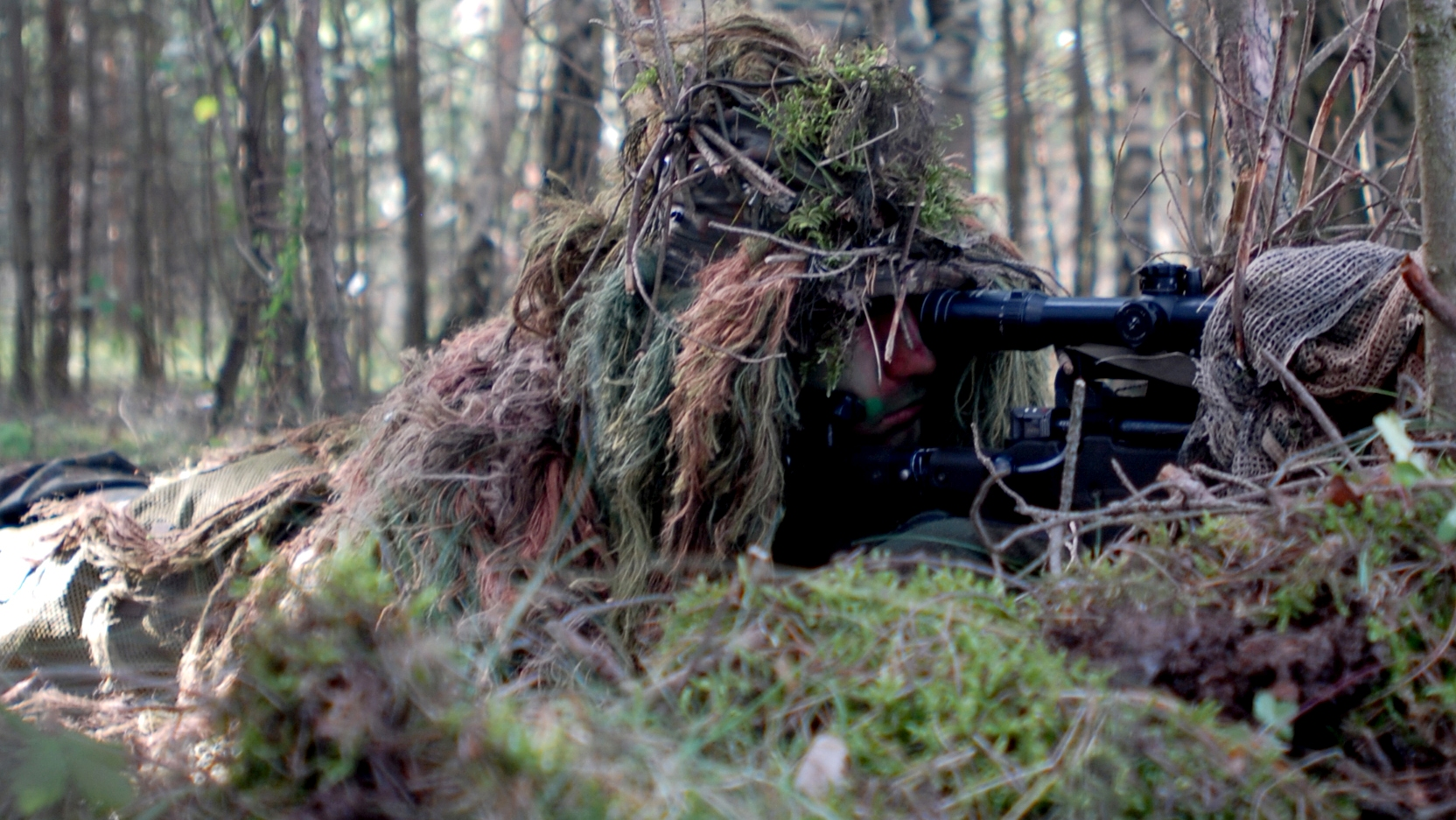
Sniper training (2006)

Initially, only officers and non-commissioned officers of the Bundeswehr could apply for service with the KSK and the subsequent evaluation period. As a prerequisite for entry, the Bundeswehr Commando Course (Einzelkämpferlehrgang) must have been completed by the applicant. Since 2005, however, applications have also been opened to civilians and enlisted personnel who must complete an 18-month Long Range Surveillance training cycle before the intense KSK selection process begins.

The selection process for the combat positions is divided into two phases: a three-week-long physical and psychological training regimen (normally having a 40% pass rate), and later a three-month-long physical endurance phase (normally with an 8–10% pass rate). During latter phase, the KSK use the Black Forest as their proving grounds for prospective operators. In this time, candidates must undergo a grueling 90-hour cross-country run, followed by a three-week international Combat Survival Course at the German-led multinational Special Operations Training Center (formerly the International Long Range Reconnaissance School) in Pfullendorf.

Upon successful completion of the selection process, candidates may be allowed to start their 2–3-year training cycle with the KSK. This training includes roughly twenty courses at over seventeen schools worldwide: in Norway for Arctic terrain, Austria for mountainous terrain; El Paso, Texas, or Israel for desert and/or bush training; San Diego for amphibious operations; and Belize for jungle experience.

According to press releases from May 2008, the Bundeswehr aims to advance the attractiveness of service in the KSK to women. This is partially because the KSK was previously unable to reach its targeted number of troops. The KSK was no longer restricted to male troops after the Bundeswehr opened all units to women in 2001. As of 2021, women occupied auxiliary positions in KSK.

The KSK is known to regularly participate in joint training exercises and personal exchange programs with SOFs from Allied nations which includes:

- Australian - 2nd Commando Regiment
- Danish - Jaeger Corps
- British - Special Air Service
- Canadian - Joint Task Force 2
- Irish - Army Ranger Wing
- Polish - JW GROM
- United States - Delta Force

== See also ==
- German special forces
- Special Operations Command (SOCOM) – U.S. equivalent command
