= Bundeswehr =

Combined military forces of Germany

Federal Defence Forces
- Bundeswehr
- Motto: Wir. Dienen. Deutschland. ("We. Serve. Germany.")
- Founded: 12 November 1955; 71 years ago
- Current form: 3 October 1990; 36 years ago
- Service branches: German Army; German Navy; German Air and Space Force; Cyber and Information Domain Service
- Headquarters: Berlin, Bonn, and Potsdam
- Website: www.bundeswehr.de/en

Leadership
- Commander-in-Chief: Federal Minister of Defence (during peacetime); Chancellor of Germany (during war)
- Chancellor: Friedrich Merz
- Defence Minister: Boris Pistorius
- Inspector General: Carsten Breuer

Personnel
- Military age: 17
- Conscription: No (conscription suspended since July 2011 by law)
- Active personnel: 190,600 (2026) (ranked 26th)
- Reserve personnel: ≈ 860,000 (2025)
- Deployed personnel: 3,000

Expenditure
- Budget: €108,2 billion (2026) (US$124 billion); Incl. 4th tranche of special assets
- Percent of GDP: 2.69% (2026)

Industry
- Domestic suppliers: Airbus; Rheinmetall; Howaldtswerke-Deutsche Werft; KNDS Deutschland; Hensoldt; MBDA Deutschland GmbH; Heckler & Koch; Diehl Defence; Carl Walther GmbH
- Foreign suppliers: United States; Sweden; United Kingdom; Netherlands; Switzerland; Canada; Italy; Belgium; Poland; Croatia; Austria; Norway; France; Israel; China; Greece
- Annual imports: US$85 million (2014–2022)
- Annual exports: US$1.53 billion (2014–2022)

Related articles
- History: Military history of Germany; Warfare directory of Germany; Wars involving Germany; Battles involving Germany
- Ranks: Rank insignia of the Bundeswehr

The Bundeswehr (German: [ˈbʊndəsˌveːɐ̯], lit. Federal Defence) are the armed forces of the Federal Republic of Germany. The Bundeswehr is divided into a military part (armed forces or Streitkräfte) and a civil part. The military part consists of the four armed forces: German Army, German Navy, German Air and Space Force and Cyber and Information Domain Service, which are supported by the Bundeswehr Joint Support Command.

As of 31 October 2026, the Bundeswehr had a strength of 190,600 active-duty military personnel and 83,200 civilians, placing it among the 30 largest military forces in the world, and making it the second largest in the European Union behind France. In addition, the Bundeswehr has approximately 860,000 reserve personnel (2025). With the German military budget at $127 billion (€108.2 billion) for 2026, the Bundeswehr is the fourth-highest-funded military in the world. Germany's defence spending had averaged approximately 1.2% of GDP over the preceding decade, well below the NATO guideline of 2%, which Germany first met in 2024. NATO's revised spending guidelines call for 3.5% of GDP allocated to defence and an additional 1.5% to critical infrastructure resilience, a threshold endorsed at the 2025 Hague summit. Germany is aiming to expand the Bundeswehr to around 203,000 soldiers by 2031 to better cope with increasing responsibilities.

Following concerns from the Russian invasion of Ukraine, Germany announced a major shift in policy, pledging a €100 billion ($116.344 billion) special fund for the Bundeswehr – to remedy years of underinvestment – along with raising the budget to above 2% GDP. In 2025, the German constitution was amended, exempting military and intelligence spending above 1% GDP from the Schuldenbremse (debt limit).

== History ==
=== Founding principles ===
The name Bundeswehr was first proposed by former Wehrmacht general and Liberal politician Hasso von Manteuffel. The Iron Cross (Eisernes Kreuz), a symbol that has a long association with the military of Germany, is its official emblem. The Schwarzes Kreuz is derived from the black cross insignia of the medieval Teutonic knights; since 1813 the symbol has been used to denote a military decoration for all ranks.

When the Bundeswehr was established in 1955, its founding principles were based on developing a completely new military force for the defence of West Germany. In this respect the Bundeswehr did not consider itself to be a successor to either the Reichswehr (1921–1935) of the Weimar Republic or Hitler's Wehrmacht (1935–1945), and did not adhere to the traditions of any former German military organization. Its official ethos is based on three major themes:

- The aims of the military reformers at the beginning of the 19th century such as Scharnhorst, Gneisenau, and Clausewitz
- The conduct displayed by members of the military resistance against Adolf Hitler, especially the attempt of Claus von Stauffenberg and Henning von Tresckow to assassinate him.
- Its own military traditions set in 1955.

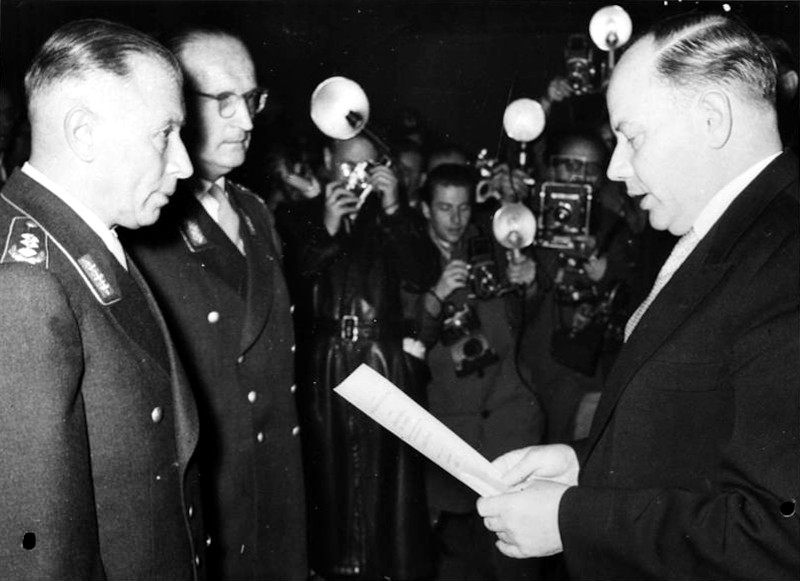
Generals Adolf Heusinger and Hans Speidel being sworn into the newly founded Bundeswehr by Theodor Blank on 12 November 1955

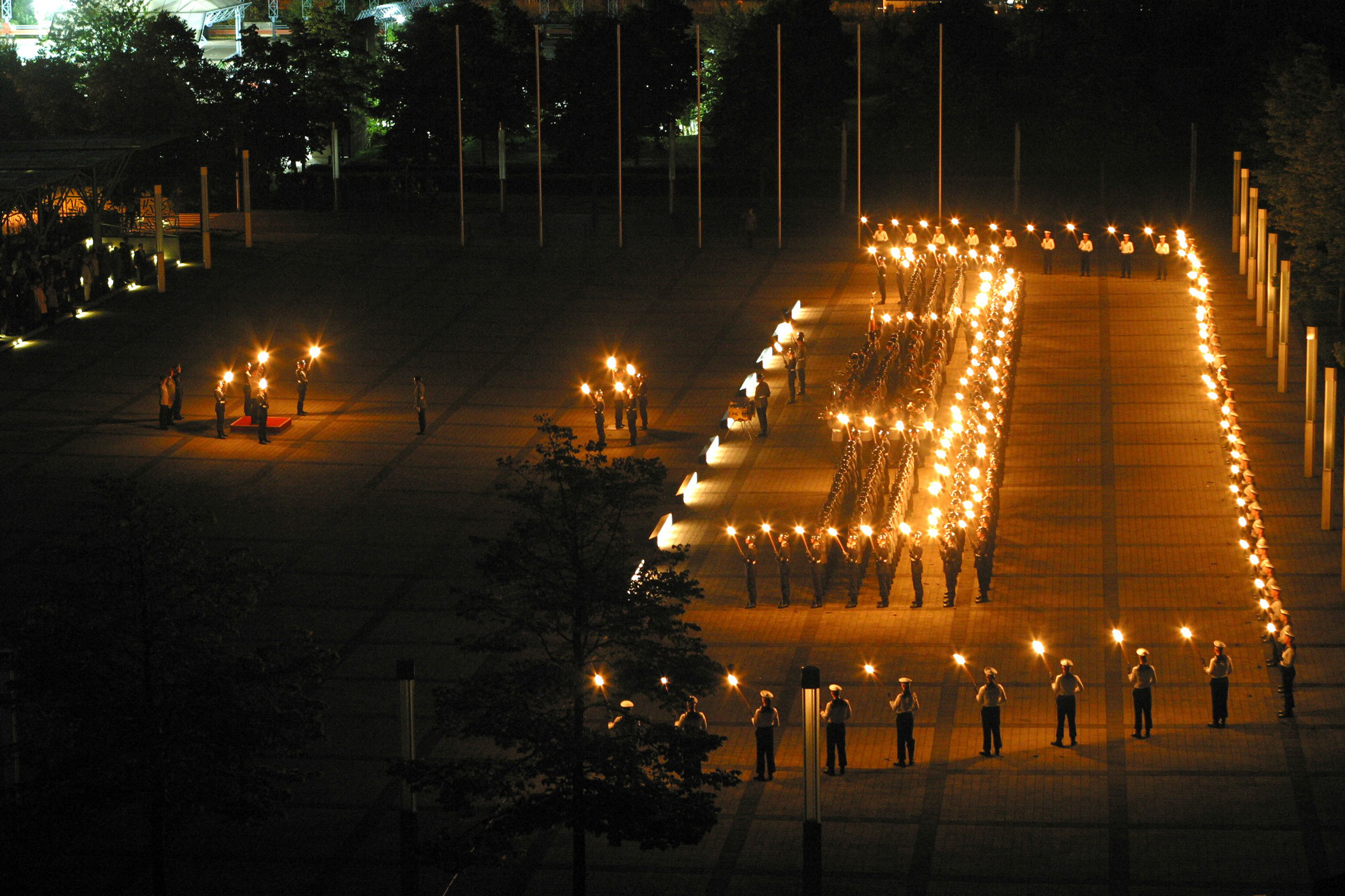
A Großer Zapfenstreich at the Federal Ministry of Defense in Bonn in 2002

One of the most visible traditions of the modern Bundeswehr is the Großer Zapfenstreich. This is a form of military tattoo that has its origins in the landsknecht era. The FRG reinstated this formal military ceremony in 1952, three years before the foundation of the Bundeswehr. Today it is performed by a military band with 4 fanfare trumpeters and timpani, a corps of drums, up to two escort companies of the Bundeswehr's Wachbataillon (or another deputized unit) and torchbearers. The Zapfenstreich is only performed during national celebrations or solemn public commemorations. It can honour distinguished persons present such as the German Federal President, or provide the conclusion to large military exercises.

Another important tradition in the modern German armed forces is the Gelöbnis: the solemn oath made by serving professional soldiers, and recruits (and formerly conscripts) during basic training. There are two kinds of oath: a pledge for recruits, and a solemn vow for full-time personnel.

The pledge is made annually on 20 July, the date on which a group of Wehrmacht officers attempted to assassinate Adolf Hitler in 1944. Recruits from the Bundeswehr's Wachbataillon make their vow at the Bendlerblock in Berlin. This was the headquarters of the resistance and also where the officers were summarily executed following the failure of the assassination attempt on Hitler. National commemorations are held nearby within the grounds of the Reichstag. Similar events also take place across the German Republic. Since 2011, when conscription was suspended, the wording of the ceremonial vow for full-time recruits and volunteer personnel is:

"Ich gelobe, der Bundesrepublik Deutschland treu zu dienen und das Recht und die Freiheit des deutschen Volkes tapfer zu verteidigen."

"I pledge to serve the Federal Republic of Germany loyally and to defend the right and the freedom of the German people bravely."

Serving Bundeswehr personnel replace "Ich gelobe, ..." with "Ich schwöre, ..." ("I swear...").

=== Cold War: 1955–1990 ===
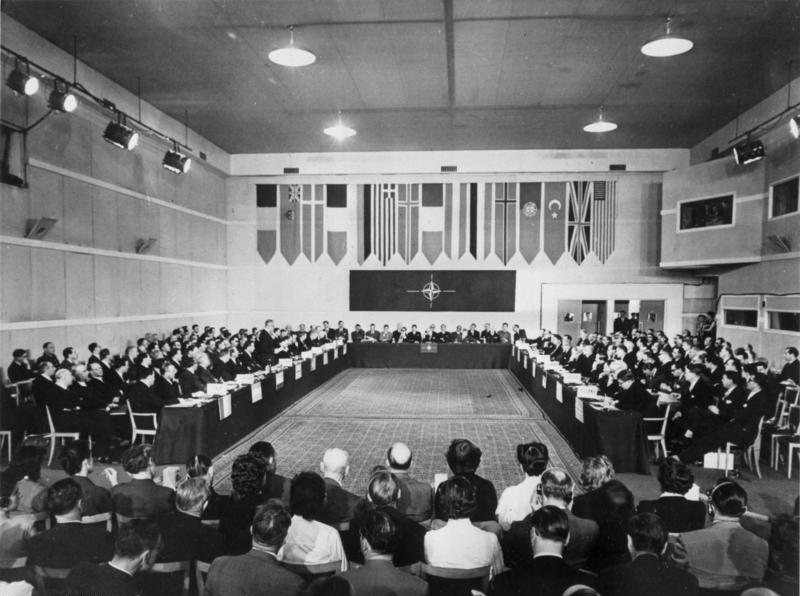
The Federal Republic of Germany joined NATO in 1955.

After World War II the responsibility for the security of Germany as a whole rested with the four occupying Allied Powers: the United States, the United Kingdom, France and the Soviet Union. Germany had been without armed forces since the Wehrmacht was dissolved following World War II. When the Federal Republic of Germany was founded in 1949, it was without a military. Germany remained completely demilitarized and any plans for a German military were forbidden by Allied regulations.

Some naval mine-sweeping units such as the German Mine Sweeping Administration (Deutscher Minenräumdienst) continued to exist, but they remained unarmed and under Allied control and did not serve as a national defence force. The Federal Border Protection (Bundesgrenzschutz), a mobile, lightly armed police force of 10,000 men, was formed on 14 March 1951 and expanded to 20,000 men on 19 June 1953. A proposal to integrate West German troops with soldiers of France, Belgium, the Netherlands, Luxembourg and Italy in a European Defence Community was proposed but never implemented.

There was a discussion among the United States, the United Kingdom and France over the issue of a revived (West) German military. In particular, France was reluctant to allow Germany to rearm in light of recent history (Germany had invaded France twice in living memory, in World War I and World War II, and also defeated France in the Franco-Prussian War of 1870/71). However, after the project for a European Defence Community failed in the French National Assembly in 1954, France agreed to West German accession to NATO and rearmament.

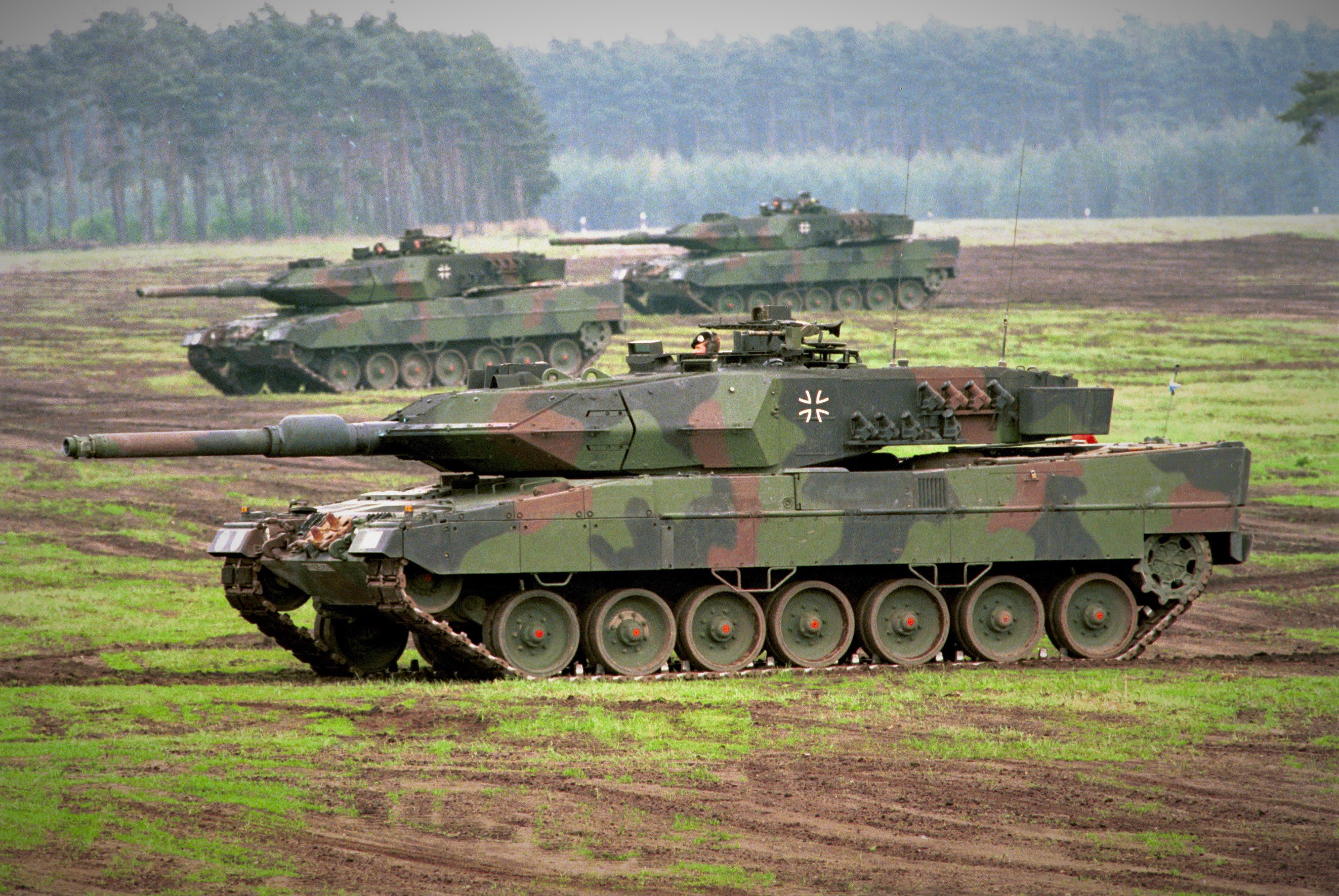
Leopard 2 tanks

With growing tensions between the Soviet Union and the West, especially after the Korean War, this policy was to be revised. While the German Democratic Republic (East Germany) was already secretly rearming, the seeds of a new West German force started in 1950 when former high-ranking German officers were tasked by Chancellor Konrad Adenauer to discuss the options for West German rearmament. The results of a meeting in the monastery of Himmerod formed the conceptual base to build the new armed forces in West Germany.

The Amt Blank (Blank Agency, named after its director Theodor Blank), the predecessor of the later Federal Ministry of Defence, was formed the same year to prepare the establishment of the future forces. Hasso von Manteuffel, a former general of the Wehrmacht and Free Democratic Party politician, submitted the name Bundeswehr for the new forces. This name was later confirmed by the West German Bundestag.

The Bundeswehr was officially established on the 200th birthday of Scharnhorst on 12 November 1955. In personnel and education terms, the most important initial feature of the new German armed forces was to be their orientation as citizen defenders of a democratic state, fully subordinate to the political leadership of the country. A personnel screening committee was created to make sure that the future colonels and generals of the armed forces were those whose political attitude and experience would be acceptable to the new democratic state. There were a few key reformers, such as General Ulrich de Maiziere, General Graf von Kielmansegg, and Graf von Baudissin, who reemphasised some of the more democratic parts of Germany's armed forces history in order to establish a solid civil-military basis to build upon.

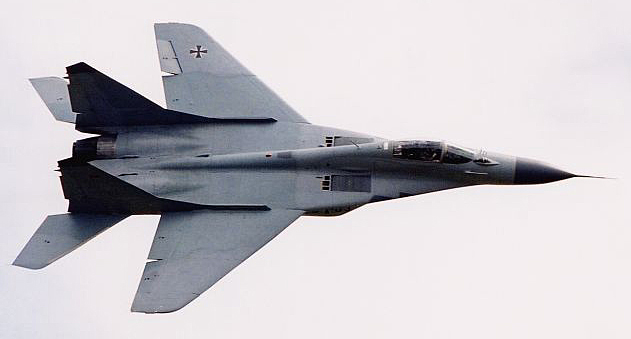
The Bundeswehr was the first NATO member to use the Soviet-built MiG 29 jet, taken over from the former East German Air Force after reunification.

After an amendment of the Basic Law in 1955, West Germany became a member of NATO. The first public military review took place at Andernach, in January 1956. In 1956, conscription for all men between the ages of 18 and 45 was reintroduced, later augmented by a civil alternative with longer duration (see Conscription in Germany). In response, East Germany formed its own military force, the Nationale Volksarmee (NVA), in 1956, with conscription being established only in 1962. The Nationale Volksarmee was eventually dissolved with the reunification of Germany in 1990. Compulsory conscription was suspended – but not completely abolished as an alternative – in January 2011.

During the Cold War the Bundeswehr was the backbone of NATO's conventional defence in Central Europe. It had a strength of 495,000 military and 170,000 civilian personnel. Although Germany had smaller armed forces than France and the United States, Cold War historian John Lewis Gaddis assesses the Bundeswehr as "perhaps (the) world's best army". The Army consisted of three corps with 12 divisions, most of them heavily armed with tanks and APCs. The Luftwaffe owned significant numbers of tactical combat aircraft and took part in NATO's integrated air defence (NATINAD). The Navy was tasked and equipped to defend the Baltic Approaches, to provide escort reinforcement and resupply shipping in the North Sea and to contain the Soviet Baltic Fleet.

During the Soviet–Afghan War in the 1980s, German special forces of the Bundeswehr were deployed as part of a covert operation. During this time, Operation Summer Rain played a significant role. The German Federal Intelligence Service (BND) conducted this secret mission, where special forces were infiltrated from West Germany to Pakistan and then into Afghanistan.

The primary task of these special units was to clandestinely acquire Soviet weapon technology, including armor for combat helicopters, vehicles, landmines, modern ammunition such as uranium rounds, rocket warheads, night vision devices, and navigation technology. Collaboration with the insurgent Mujahideen was central to this covert operation.

During this time the Bundeswehr did not take part in combat operations. However, there were a number of large-scale training exercises resulting in operational casualties. The first such incident was in June 1957, when 15 paratroop recruits drowned in the Iller river, Bavaria.

=== German Reunification 1990 ===
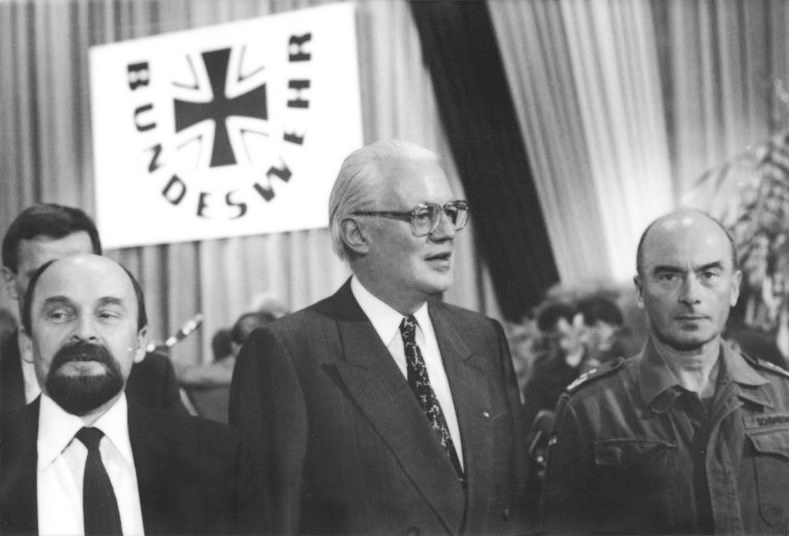
At a festive event on German Unity Day, Federal Defense Minister Gerhard Stoltenberg takes over command of the armed forces of the former GDR.

At the time of reunification, the German military boasted a manpower of some 585,000 soldiers. As part of the German reunification process, under the Treaty on the Final Settlement with Respect to Germany (Two-Plus Four Treaty), which paved the way for reunification, the Bundeswehr was to be reduced to 370,000 personnel, of whom no more than 345,000 were to be in the Army and Air Force. This would be Germany's contribution to the Treaty on Conventional Armed Forces in Europe, and the restrictions would enter into force at the time the CFE treaty would. As a result, the Bundeswehr was significantly reduced, and the former East German Nationale Volksarmee (NVA) was disbanded at the moment of German reunification, with a portion of its personnel and materiel being absorbed into the Bundeswehr.

A Eurofighter Typhoon of the Luftwaffe

About 50,000 Volksarmee personnel were integrated into the Bundeswehr on 2 October 1990. This figure was rapidly reduced as conscripts and short-term volunteers completed their service. A number of senior officers (but no generals or admirals) received limited contracts for up to two years to continue daily operations. Personnel remaining in the Bundeswehr were awarded new contracts and new ranks, dependent on their individual qualification and experience. Many were granted and accepted a lower rank than previously held in the Volksarmee.

In general, the unification process of the two militaries – under the slogan "Armee der Einheit" (or "Army of Unity") – has been seen publicly as a major success and an example for other parts of the society.

With the reduction, a large amount of the military hardware of the Bundeswehr, as well as of the Volksarmee, had to be disposed of. Most of the armoured vehicles and fighter jet aircraft (the Bundesluftwaffe – due to reunification – was the only air force in the world that flew both Phantoms and MIGs) were dismantled under international disarmament procedures. Many ships were scrapped or sold, often to the Baltic states or Indonesia (the latter received 39 former Volksmarine vessels of various types).

With reunification, all restrictions on the manufacture and possession of conventional arms that had been imposed on the Bundeswehr as a condition for West German rearmament were lifted.

Since 1996, Germany also has its own special forces, the Kommando Spezialkräfte (Special Forces Command). It was formed after German citizens had to be rescued from the Rwandan genocide by Belgian Para-Commandos as the Special Commands of the Federal Police were not capable of operating in a war zone.

=== Reorientation ===
A major event for the German military was a series of defense spending cuts and the suspension of the compulsory conscription for men in 2011. These were introduced by Chancellor Angela Merkel and Finance Minister Wolfgang Schäuble as part of austerity measures in response to the Great Recession and the European debt crisis. In 2011/12, a major reform of the Bundeswehr was announced under Thomas de Maizière, further limiting the number of military bases and soldiers. The land forces of the Bundeswehr would have three large units at divisional level. There are currently five. The number of brigades decreased from eleven to eight.

German military expenditures are lower than comparable countries such as the United Kingdom, or countries of the European Union such as France, especially when taking into account Germany's larger population and economy. This discrepancy is often criticized by Germany's NATO allies, as far back as Obama-era US Secretary of Defense Robert M. Gates.

As one result of the 2014 NATO Wales summit which was attended by both Merkel and Ursula von der Leyen in September 2014, the Bundeswehr acknowledged in October chronic equipment problems that rendered its armed forces "unable to deliver its defensive NATO promises". Among the problems cited were dysfunctional weapons systems, armored vehicles, aircraft, and naval vessels unfit for immediate service due to a neglect of maintenance, and serious equipment and spare parts shortages. The situation was so dire in 2016 that it was acknowledged that most of Germany's fighter aircraft and combat helicopters were not in deployable condition, although the Air Force had almost 38,000 soldiers, and von der Leyen's daycare system.

In 2015, as a result of the Annexation of Crimea by the Russian Federation, Germany announced what was termed "a major increase" in defense spending. In May 2015, the German government approved an increase in defense spending, at the time 1.3% of GDP, by 6.2% over the following five years, allowing the Ministry of Defense to fully modernize the army. The 2015 reform set a required strength of 185,000 soldiers. Plans were also announced to significantly expand the tank fleet to a potential number of 328, order 131 more Boxer armored personnel carriers, increase the submarine fleet, and to develop a new fighter jet to replace the Panavia Tornado. Germany considered increasing the size of the army, and in May 2016 it announced it would spend €130 billion on new equipment by 2030 and add nearly 7,000 soldiers by 2023 in the first German military expansion since the end of the Cold War. In February 2017, the German government announced another expansion, which would increase the number of its professional soldiers by 20,000 by 2024.

As of May 2025, the Bundeswehr is permanently stationing a full armored brigade abroad for the first time in its postwar history. The 45th Panzer Brigade "Litauen" based in Lithuania, is part of Germany's broader Zeitenwende strategy to reinforce NATO's eastern flank and transition from rotational deployments to structural forward presence. The brigade is expected to include 2,000 personnel by 2026, with additional supporting infrastructure provided jointly with Lithuania.

=== Coordination with European partners ===
As a consequence of improved Dutch-German cooperation, since 2014 two of the three Royal Netherlands Army Brigades are under German Command. In 2014, the 11th Airmobile Brigade was integrated into the German Division of fast forces (DSK). The Dutch 43rd Mechanized Brigade will be assigned to the 1st Panzer Division of the German army, with the integration starting at the beginning of 2016, and the unit becoming operational at the end of 2019. In February 2016 it was announced that the Seebatallion of the German Navy would start to operate under Royal Dutch Navy command. The Dutch-German military cooperation was seen in 2016 by von der Leyen and Dutch Minister of Defence Jeanine Hennis-Plasschaert as an example for setting up a European defense union.

According to a policy dictated by von der Leyen in February 2017, the Bundeswehr is to play a greater role as "anchor army" for smaller NATO states, by improving coordination between its divisions and smaller members' Brigades.

A further proposal by Minister of Defence Ursula von der Leyen, to allow non-German EU nationals to join the Bundeswehr, was met in July 2016 by strong opposition, even from her own party.

It was announced in February 2017 that the Czech Republic's 4th Rapid Deployment Brigade and Romania's 81st Mechanized Brigade would be integrated into Germany's 10 Armoured Division and Rapid Response Forces Division. The 4 RDB-10 PD link is not an isolated Czech–German initiative. It sits beside:

- Netherlands – three brigades integrated into German divisions since 2016.
- Romania – 9th Mechanised Brigade tied to the Bundeswehr's Rapid Response Forces Division.
- Lithuania (2025) – standing up Panzer Brigade 45 under 10 PD for the new German permanent brigade in Rūdninkai.

Taken together, Germany is slowly contributing to a pre-integrated divisional structure.

=== Consequences of 2022 Russian invasion of Ukraine ===
As of 31 December 2022, the number of active military personnel in the Bundeswehr was 183,051. Military expenditure in Germany was at $52.8 billion in 2020, roughly 1.3% of the country's GDP.

At the end of February 2022, in light of Russia's invasion of Ukraine, chancellor Olaf Scholz announced a plan to increase the power of the German military, pledging €100 billion ($112.7 billion) of the 2022 budget for the armed forces and repeating his promise to reach the 2% of gross domestic product spending on defense in line with (as editorialized by Deutsche Welle) NATO requirements.

According to information from defense politicians of the federal German parliament, representatives of the armaments industry and other experts, in October 2022 the Bundeswehr only had enough ammunition in stock for one or two days during wartime. A report made by the Ministry of Defence revealed problems in the Bundeswehr such as limited preparedness and lack of equipment. In the letter accompanying the report which was sent to the federal German parliament, the Minister of Defence noted that the situation would improve but "closing the gaps takes time".

In 2025, the new government under Chancellor Friedrich Merz passed laws to further significantly expand the Bundeswehr, both in materiel and personnel. The annual military budget of Germany is to grow from ~2% of its GDP in 2025 to 3.5% in 2029. In October 2025, the Federal Ministry of Defence consolidated its procurement planning into a single framework totalling approximately €377 billion across roughly 320 programmes spanning air, naval, land, air defence, ammunition, and C4ISR domains. A new push to gain more volunteers and mechanisms for compulsory drafting in case these efforts are insufficient ("Nordic model") have been announced to come into force on 1 January 2026. The goal is to reach a number of 260,000 of active Bundeswehr personnel, a 30% increase from its 2025 number.

In April 2026, Germany unveiled its first standalone military strategy since the Second World War, titled "Verantwortung für Europa" (Responsibility for Europe), presented by Defence Minister Boris Pistorius on 22 April. The strategy package included a new capability profile, a personnel growth plan, a revised reserve strategy, and an administrative reform agenda of 153 concrete measures. Russia was identified as the primary threat, and the strategy adopted a "one theatre approach" treating NATO territory, the Middle East, and the Indo-Pacific as interconnected security spaces.

== Organisation ==
=== History of organisation ===
With the growing number of missions abroad it was recognized that the Bundeswehr required a new command structure. A reform commission under the chairmanship of the former President Richard von Weizsäcker presented its recommendations in spring 2000.

In October 2000 the Joint Support Service, the Streitkräftebasis, was established to concentrate logistics and other supporting functions such as military police, supply and communications under one command. 2025, the Joint Support Service was dissolved and its commands and departments reassigned to the Joint Support Command. Medical support was reorganised with the establishment of the Joint Medical Service. In 2016, the Bundeswehr created its youngest branch the Cyber and Information Space Command.

=== Senior leadership ===
The Minister of Defence is supported by the Chief of Defense (CHOD, Generalinspekteur) and the service chiefs (Inspekteure: Inspector of the Army, Inspector of the Air Force, Inspector of the Navy) and their respective staffs in his or her function as commander-in-chief. The CHOD and the service chiefs form the Military Command Council (Militärischer Führungsrat) with functions similar to those of the Joint Chiefs of Staff in the United States. Subordinate to the CHOD is the Armed Forces Operational Command (OpFüKdoBw). For smaller missions one of the service HQs (e.g. the Fleet Command) may exercise command and control of forces in missions abroad. The Bundestag must approve any foreign deployment by a simple majority. This has led to some discontent with Germany's allies about troop deployments e.g. in Afghanistan since parliamentary consent over such issues is relatively hard to achieve in Germany.

=== Combat forces ===
The combat forces of the Army are organised into three combat divisions and participate in multi-national command structures at the corps level. The Air and Space Force maintains three divisions and the Navy is structured into two flotillas. The Joint Support Command and the Joint Medical Service are both organized in four regional commands of identical structure. All of these services also have general commands for training, procurement, and other general issues.

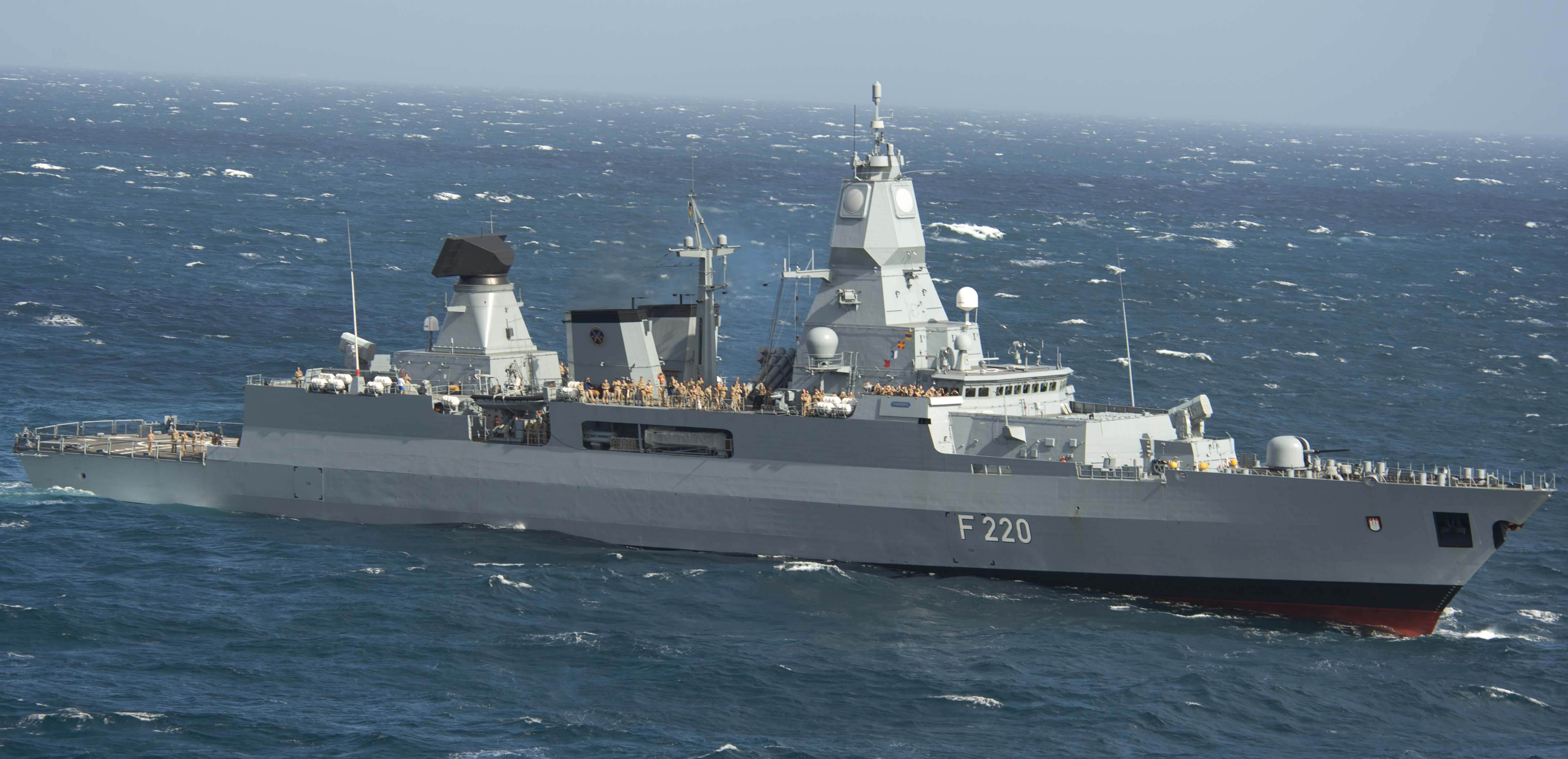
A German Navy Sachsen-class frigate

=== Operational Command ===
The Armed Forces Operational Command (Einsatzführungskommando der Bundeswehr) is the only joint military command of the Bundeswehr. It controls all missions abroad. The command is located at Henning von Tresckow Kaserne (Schwielowsee) near Potsdam and is headed by a Generalleutnant (3-star general).

=== Mission ===
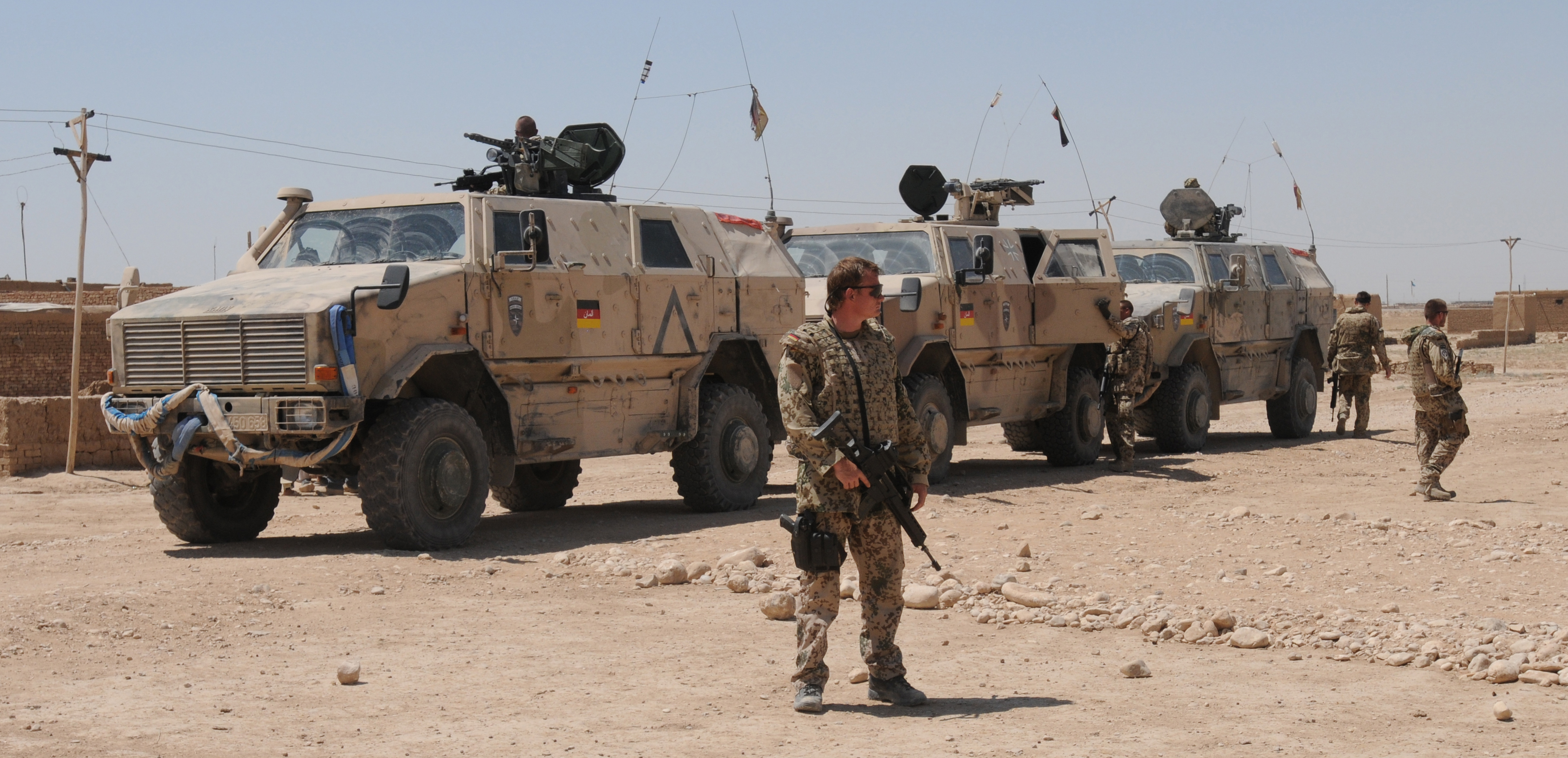
German Army soldiers in Afghanistan in front of Dingo infantry mobility vehicles, 2009

The role of the Bundeswehr is described in the Constitution of Germany (Art. 87a) as absolutely defensive only. Its only active role before 1990 was the Katastropheneinsatz (disaster control). Within the Bundeswehr, it helped after natural disasters both in Germany and abroad. After 1990, the international situation changed from east–west confrontation to one of general uncertainty and instability.

After a ruling of the Federal Constitutional Court in 1994 the term "defence" has been defined to not only include protection of the borders of Germany, but also crisis reaction and conflict prevention, or more broadly as guarding the security of Germany anywhere in the world. According to the definition given by Defence Minister Peter Struck (2002 to 2005), it may be necessary to defend Germany even at the Hindu Kush. This requires the Bundeswehr to take part in operations outside of the borders of Germany, as part of NATO or the European Union and mandated by the UN.

=== Military spending ===
	1990	1991	1992	1993	1994	1995	1996	1997	1998	1999
Yearly budget (in % of the GDP)	2.4%	2.12%	1.98%	1.8%	1.65%	1.59%	1.56%	1.5%	1.48%	1.48%
	2000	2001	2002	2003	2004	2005	2006	2007	2008	2009
Yearly budget (in % of the GDP)	1.44%	1.41%	1.41%	1.4%	1.35%	1.33%	1.27%	1.24%	1.28%	1.39%
	2010	2011	2012	2013	2014	2015	2016	2017	2018	2019
Yearly budget (in billion €)	€31.14B	€31.55B	€31.87B	€33.3B	€32.4B	€32.97B	€34.3B	€37B	€38.5B	€43.2B
Yearly budget (in % of the GDP)	1.35%	1.28%	1.31%	1.22%	1.16%	1.16%	1.18%	1.21%	1.23%	1.32%
	2020	2021	2022	2023	2024	2025	2026	2027	2028	2029
Yearly budget (in billion €)	€45.65B	€46.9B	€53B	€58.5B (€8.4B special fund)	€71.75B (€19.8B special fund)	€86.31B (€24.06B special fund)	€108.2B (€25.51B special fund)	€139.7B (€30.0B special fund)	€153.9B	€162.9B
Yearly budget (in % of the GDP)	1.49%	1.43%	1.46%	1.6%	2%	2.22%	2.69%	3%	—	> 3.5%

Budget confirmed for the following year
Expected budget

==== Representation of the budget since 2010 ====
Base budget (in Euros)
Special fund (in Euros)

Military spending in % of GDP

== Operations ==
Since the early 1990s the Bundeswehr has become more and more engaged in international operations in and around the former Yugoslavia, and also in other parts of the world like Cambodia or Somalia. After the 11 September 2001 attacks, German forces were employed in most related theaters except Iraq.

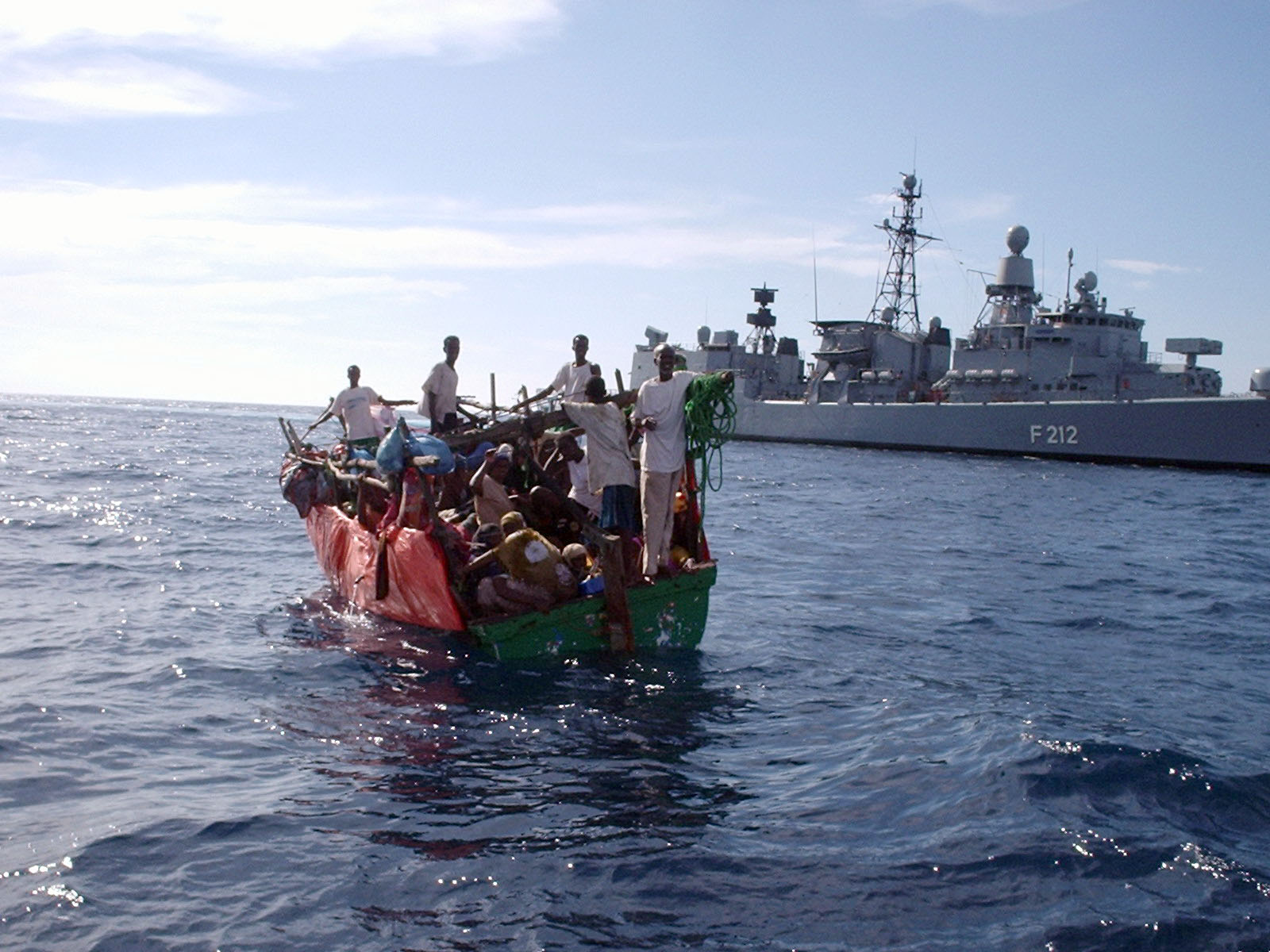
Frigate Karlsruhe of the German Navy rescuing shipwrecked people off the coast of Somalia where it is patrolling

Currently (1 April 2024) there are 1,084 Bundeswehr soldiers deployed in:

- Kosovo
  - KFOR
    - 100 personnel
- South Sudan
  - UNMISS
    - 14 personnel
- Lebanon
  - UNIFIL
    - 226 personnel
- Mediterranean Sea
  - Operation Sea Guardian
    - 42 personnel
- Mediterranean Sea
  - Operation Irini
    - 16 personnel
- Syria / Iraq
  - Operation Counter Daesh
    - 293 personnel
- Western Sahara
  - MINURSO
    - 3 personnel

In addition to the numbers above, 51 soldiers are on permanent stand-by for medical evacuation operations around the world in assistance of ongoing German or coalition operations (STRATAIRMEDEVAC).

In support of Allied stabilization efforts in Iraq, the Bundeswehr is also training the new Iraqi security forces in locations outside Iraq, such as the United Arab Emirates and Germany.

Since 1994, the Bundeswehr has lost about 100 troops in foreign deployments, including in Afghanistan.

In 2025, the Bundeswehr undertook its first permanent foreign deployment since World War II, establishing the 45th Panzer Brigade in Lithuania. This brigade is expected to reach 5,000 troops by 2027.

== Equipment ==
=== Lists of equipment ===
==== Equipment of the army ====
See also:

- List of small arms of the Bundeswehr
- List of Bundeswehr ammunition
- List of wheeled vehicles of the Bundeswehr
- List of tracked vehicles of the Bundeswehr

==== Equipment of the air force ====
See also:

- List of aircraft of the Bundeswehr
- Equipment of the German Air Force

===== Equipment of the navy =====
See also:

- List of aircraft of the Bundeswehr

=== Planned investments ===
As of October 2025, the Federal Ministry of Defence manages a consolidated procurement framework totalling approximately €377 billion across roughly 320 programmes. Of this, approximately €83 billion in contracts were expected to be signed by end-2026; the remainder represents programmatic intent dependent on future parliamentary appropriations. Estimated allocations by domain include:

- Combat vehicles: €52.5 billion
- Munitions: €70.3 billion
- Vehicles and accessories: €20.8 billion
- Communications equipment: €15.9 billion
- Field and logistics material: €20.9 billion
- Aircraft and missiles: €34.2 billion
- Satellite communications: €13.3 billion
- Naval vessels and other equipment: €36.6 billion

== Appearance ==
=== Uniforms ===
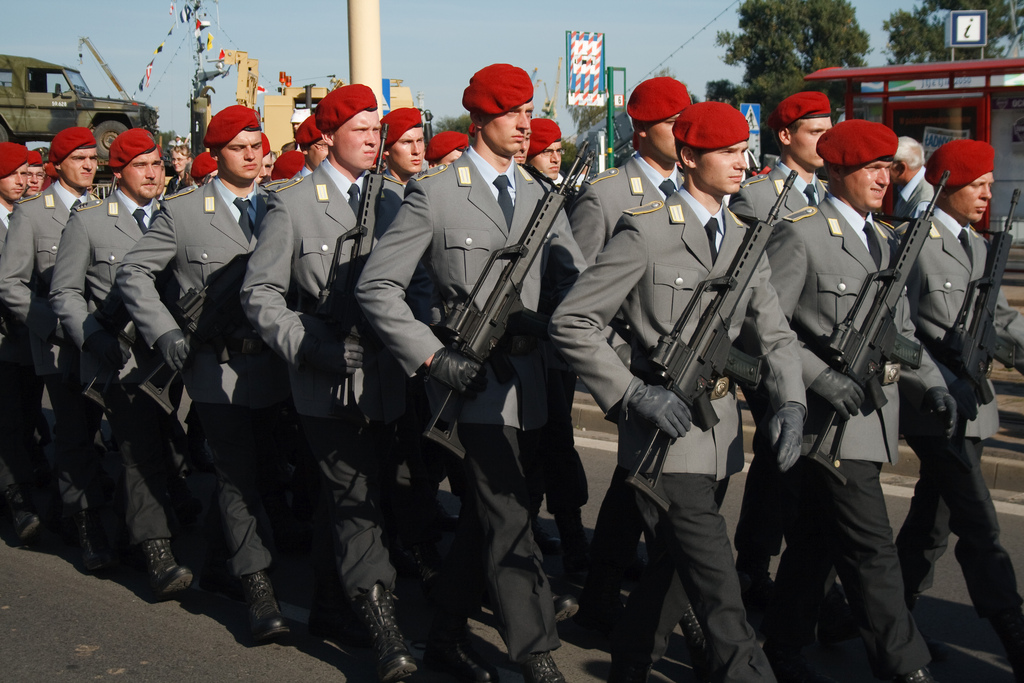
German Army signallers in service uniforms

The service uniform is theoretically the standard type of Bundeswehr uniform for general duty and off-post activity, but is most associated with ceremonial occasions. The army's service uniform consists of a light grey, single-breasted coat and darker grey trousers, worn with a light blue shirt, black tie, and black shoes. The peaked, visored cap has been replaced by the beret as the most common form of headgear. Dress uniforms featuring dinner jackets or double-breasted coats are worn by officers for various social occasions.

The battle and work uniform consists of Flecktarn camouflage fatigues, which are also worn on field duty. In practice, they are also used for general duty and off-post at least at barracks where there is also field duty even by others, and for the way home or to the post, and generally regarded as the Heer uniform. In all three services, light sand-coloured uniforms are available for duty in warmer climates. In 2016 a new Multitarn pattern was launched, similar to the MultiCam uniforms of the British Army or US Army.

A different, traditional variety of the service uniform is worn by the Gebirgsjäger (mountain infantry), consisting of ski jacket, stretch trousers, and ski boots. Instead of the beret, they wear the grey "mountain cap". The field uniform is the same, except for the (optional) metal Edelweiss worn on the forage cap.

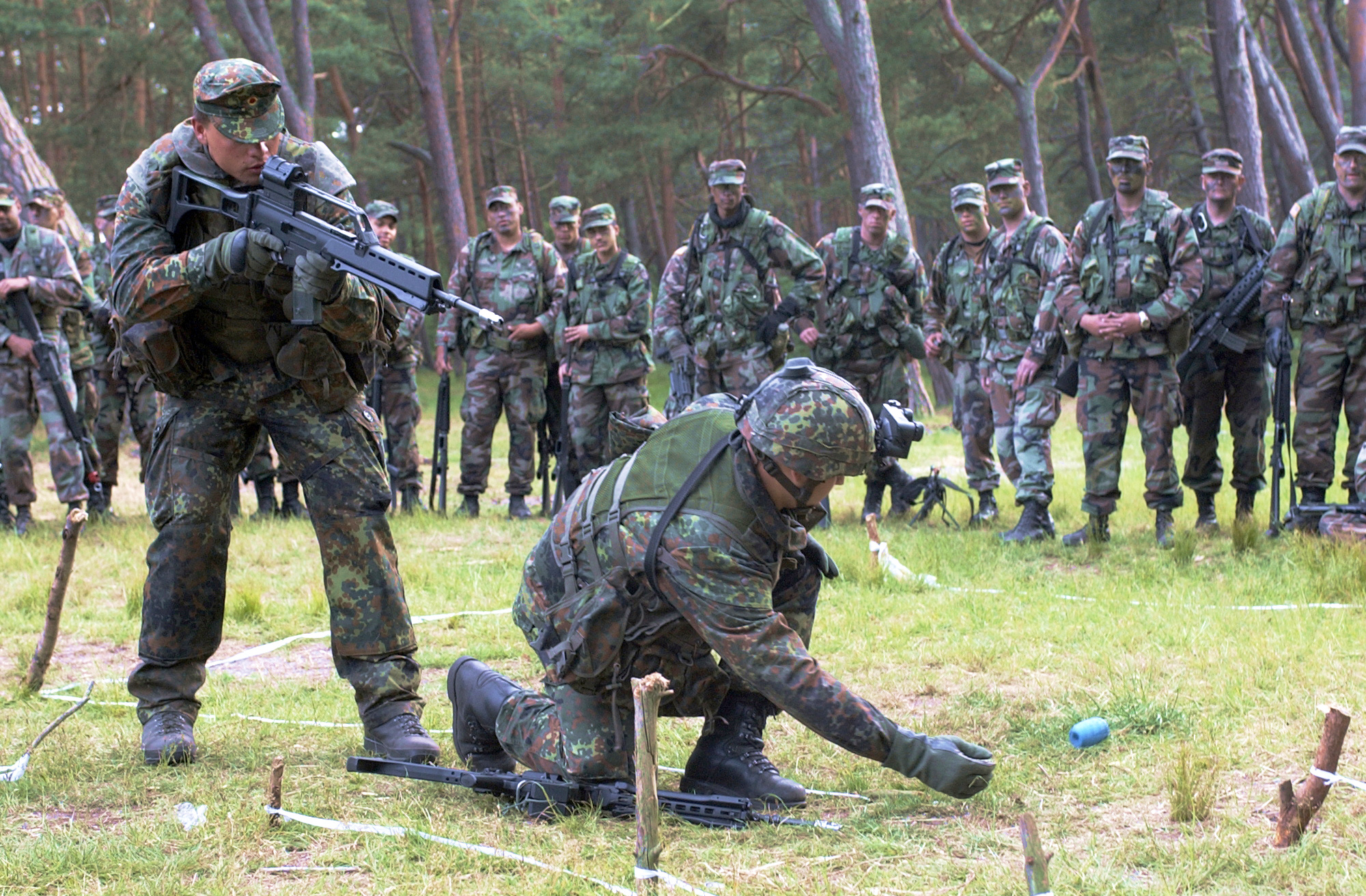
A German infantryman stands at the ready with his Heckler & Koch G36 during a practice exercise in 2004 as U.S. troops watch in the background. All rifles in the photo are equipped with blank firing adapters.

The traditional arm-of-service colours appear as lapel facings and as piping on shoulder straps. Generals wear an inner piping of gold braid; other officers wear silver piping. Lapel facings and piping are maroon for general staff, green for infantry, red for artillery, pink for armour, black for engineers, yellow for communications, dark yellow for reconnaissance and various other colors for the remaining branches. Combat troops wear green (infantry), black (armour), or maroon (airborne) berets. Logistics troops and combat support troops, such as artillery or engineers, wear red berets. A gold or silver badge on the beret denotes the individual branch of service.

The Navy wear the traditional navy blue, double-breasted coat and trousers; enlisted personnel wear either a white shirt or a navy blue shirt with the traditional navy collar. White uniforms provide an alternative for summer. The officer's dress cap is mounted with a gold anchor surrounded by a wreath. The visor of the admiral's cap bears a double row of oak leaves. U-boat captains wear the traditional white hat.

The Air and Space Force service uniform consists of a blue jacket and trousers with a light blue shirt, dark blue tie, and black shoes. Olive battle dress similar to the army fatigue uniform is worn in basic training and during other field duty. Flying personnel wear wings on their right breast. Other Air and Space Force personnel wear a modified wing device with a symbol in its centre denoting service specialisation. These Tätigkeitsabzeichen come in bronze, silver, or gold, depending on one's length of service in the specialty. Wings, superimposed over a wreath, in gold, silver, or bronze, depending on rank, are also worn on the service or field cap.

Service uniform of the German Army (Heer)

Service uniform of the German Air and Space Force (Luftwaffe)

=== Ranks ===
In general, officer ranks are those used in the Prussian and pre-1945 German armies. Officer rank insignia are worn on shoulder straps or shoulder boards. Army (Heer) and Air and Space Force (Luftwaffe) junior officers' insignia are four pointed silver stars while field grade officers wear silver (black or white on camouflage uniforms) stars and an oak wreath around the lowest star. The stars and wreath are gold for general officers. In the case of naval (Marine) officers, rank is indicated by gold stripes on the lower sleeve of the blue service jacket and on shoulder boards of the white uniform.

Soldier and NCO ranks are similar to those of the Prussian and pre-1945 German armies. In the army and air force, a Gefreiter corresponds to the NATO rank OR-2 and Obergefreiter as well as Hauptgefreiter to OR-3, while OR-4 stands for Stabsgefreiter and Oberstabsgefreiter. An Unteroffizier is the lowest-ranking sergeant (OR-5), followed by Stabsunteroffizier (also OR-5), Feldwebel and Oberfeldwebel (OR-6), Hauptfeldwebel (OR-7/8), Stabsfeldwebel (OR-8) and Oberstabsfeldwebel (OR-9). Ranks of army and air and space force enlisted personnel are designated by stripes, chevrons, and "sword knots" worn on rank slides.

Naval enlisted rank designations are worn on the upper (OR 1–5) or lower (OR-6 and above) sleeve along with a symbol based on an anchor for the service specialization (rating). Army and air force officer candidates hold the separate ranks of Fahnenjunker (OR-5), Fähnrich (OR-6) and Oberfähnrich (OR-7/8), and wear the appropriate rank insignia plus a silver cord bound around it. Officers candidates in the navy Seekadett (sea cadet; equivalent to OR-5) and Fähnrich zur See (midshipman second class; OR-6) wear the rank insignia of the respective enlisted ranks but with a gold star instead of the rating symbol, while an Oberfähnrich zur See (midshipman first class; OR-7/8) wears an officer type thin rank stripe.

Medical personnel of all three services wear a version of the traditional caduceus (staff with entwined serpents) on their shoulder straps or sleeve. The officers' ranks have own designations differing from the line officers, the rank insignias however are basically the same.

=== Women ===
Women have served in the medical service since 1975. From 1993 they were also allowed to serve as enlisted personnel and non-commissioned officers in the medical service and the army bands. In 2000, in a lawsuit brought up by Tanja Kreil, the European Court of Justice issued a ruling allowing women to serve in more roles than previously allowed. Since 2001 they can serve in all functions of service without restriction, but they are not subject to conscription. There are presently around 25,417 women on active duty and a number of female reservists who take part in all duties including peacekeeping missions and other operations. In 1994, Verena von Weymarn became Generalarzt der Luftwaffe (Surgeon General of the Air Force), the first woman ever to reach the rank of general in the armed forces of Germany.

For women, lower physical performance requirements are required in the basic fitness test, which must be completed at the time of recruitment and later on annually.

=== Rank structure ===
Officers

NATO code	OF-10	OF-9	OF-8	OF-7	OF-6	OF-5	OF-4	OF-3	OF-2		OF-1
German Army
German Army		General	Generalleutnant	Generalmajor	Brigadegeneral	Oberst	Oberstleutnant	Major	Stabshauptmann	Hauptmann	Oberleutnant	Leutnant
German Navy
German Navy		Admiral	Vizeadmiral	Konteradmiral	Flottillenadmiral	Kapitän zur See	Fregattenkapitän	Korvettenkapitän	Stabskapitänleutnant	Kapitänleutnant	Oberleutnant zur See	Leutnant zur See
German Air Force
German Air Force		General	Generalleutnant	Generalmajor	Brigadegeneral	Oberst	Oberstleutnant	Major	Stabshauptmann	Hauptmann	Oberleutnant	Leutnant
NATO code	OF-10	OF-9	OF-8	OF-7	OF-6	OF-5	OF-4	OF-3	OF-2		OF-1

NCOs and enlisted

NATO code	OR-9	OR-8	OR-7	OR-6		OR-5		OR-4				OR-3		OR-2	OR-1
German Army
German Army	Oberstabsfeldwebel	Stabsfeldwebel	Hauptfeldwebel	Oberfeldwebel	Feldwebel	Stabsunteroffizier	Unteroffizier	Stabskorporal	Korporal	Oberstabsgefreiter	Stabsgefreiter	Hauptgefreiter	Obergefreiter	Gefreiter	Soldat
German Army (Officer designate)
German Army (Officer designate)			Oberfähnrich	Fähnrich		Fahnenjunker
German Navy															No insignia
German Navy	Oberstabsbootsmann	Stabsbootsmann	Hauptbootsmann	Oberbootsmann	Bootsmann	Obermaat	Maat	Stabskorporal	Korporal	Oberstabsgefreiter	Stabsgefreiter	Hauptgefreiter	Obergefreiter	Gefreiter	Matrose
German Navy (Officer designate)
German Navy (Officer designate)			Oberfähnrich zur See	Fähnrich zur See		Seekadett
German Air Force
German Air Force	Oberstabsfeldwebel	Stabsfeldwebel	Hauptfeldwebel	Oberfeldwebel	Feldwebel	Stabsunteroffizier	Unteroffizier	Stabskorporal	Korporal	Oberstabsgefreiter	Stabsgefreiter	Hauptgefreiter	Obergefreiter	Gefreiter	Flieger
German Air Force (Officer designate)
German Air Force (Officer designate)			Oberfähnrich	Fähnrich		Fahnenjunker
NATO code	OR-9	OR-8	OR-7	OR-6		OR-5		OR-4				OR-3		OR-2	OR-1

== Recruitment ==
With the suspension of compulsory military service in 2011 and the reorientation of the Bundeswehr, the military district recruiting offices were dissolved effective 30 November 2012. Their tasks were taken over by the newly created career centers of the Bundeswehr. The career centers of the Bundeswehr are the armed forces main way of presenting itself as a nationwide employer for both military and civilian careers.

In the structure of the Bundeswehr's personnel recruitment organization adopted in 2019, there are five large career centers in Hanover, Mainz, Düsseldorf, Munich and Berlin with assessment centers. There are 16 smaller, regional career centers, of which only those in Wilhelmshaven, Stuttgart and Erfurt have an assessment center. The 110 career counseling offices belonging to the career centers are combined with 86 location teams of the career development service to form 113 counseling offices. The Bundeswehr offers numerous career paths:

- Voluntary military service (FWD) in Germany is an employment relationship for soldiers in a career of the lower rank Bundeswehr personnel. It lasts at least 7 and at most 23 months. Its legal status is similar to that of conscripts.
- A temporary soldier (abbreviated SaZ, colloquially called Zeitsoldat) is a soldier who voluntarily agrees to perform military service for a limited time. A SaZ can enter all three categories (enlisted, non-commissioned officers and officers). SaZ recruited as NCOs and officers undergo general military, career and specialty training. The regular commitment period is a minimum of 2 and a maximum of 25 years, but may not extend beyond the age of 62.
- Professional soldiers for life (Berufssoldat) are selected from the group of temporary soldiers. In contrast to temporary soldiers, professional soldiers don't have contractual commitment periods but serve until retirement. The age of retirement varies with rank. It is possible for a professional soldier to ask for early discharge or to revert to temporal service.
- Career in the Reserve: There are multiple career paths in the reserve of the armed forces for officers, NCOs, and enlisted personnel, as well as for civilians who have no prior military training.

== Awards ==
- Badge of Honour of the Bundeswehr
- Combat Action Medal of the Bundeswehr
- German Armed Forces Badge of Marksmanship
- German Armed Forces Badge for Military Proficiency
- German Armed Forces Service Medal
- German Flood Service Medal (2002)
- German Flood Service Medal (2013)
- German Parachutist Badge

== See also ==
- Controversy over Erwin Rommel as Bundeswehr's role model
- Day X plot, alleged conspiracy of Bundeswehr soldiers to murder left-leaning politicians
- Lists of military equipment of Germany
- Order of Merit of the Federal Republic of Germany
- Reichswehr
- Reservist Association of Deutsche Bundeswehr
- United Nations Training Center of the Bundeswehr
- Wehrmacht
