= Bundeswehr Joint Support Command =

Joint support of the Bundeswehr

Bundeswehr Support Area
- Unterstützungsbereich der Bundeswehr
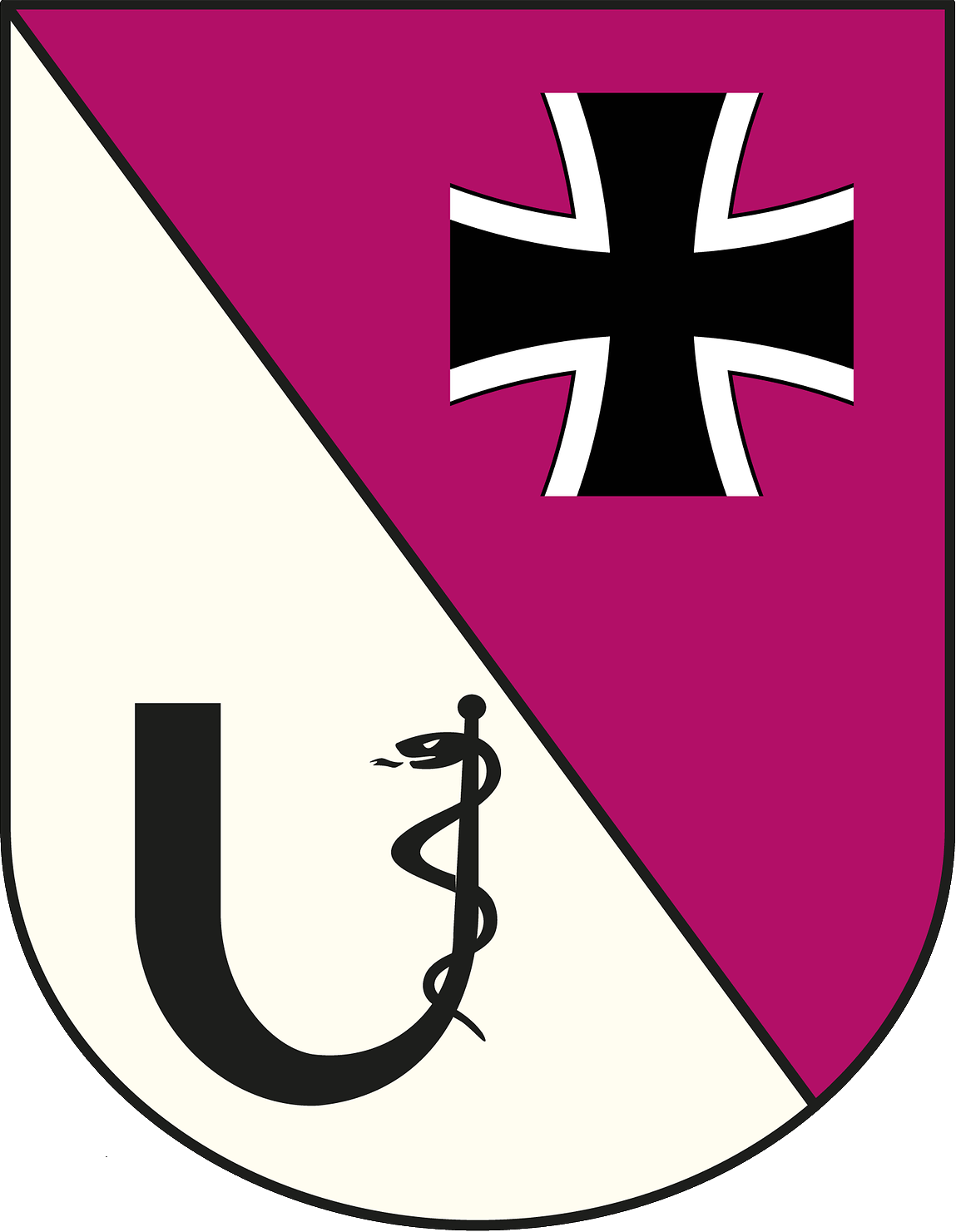
- Bundeswehr Joint Support Command (Unterstützungskommando der Bundeswehr) insignia
- Active: 1 October 2024
- Country: Germany
- Allegiance: Bundeswehr
- Type: Joint
- Size: 55,000
- Garrison/HQ: Hardthöhe, Bonn

Commanders
- Commander of the Joint Support Command: Generalleutnant Gerald Funke (German Air Force)
- Deputy Commander of the Joint Support Command and Commander of the Health Services Command of the Bundeswehr, BMVg Chief medical officer: Generaloberstabsarzt Dr. med. Ralf Hoffmann (Medical Service)

The Bundeswehr Support Area (German: Unterstützungsbereich der Bundeswehr, lit. 'Support area') is a support formation of the German Bundeswehr activated on 1 October 2024. The Bundeswehr Support Area and its Command provide logistical, medical, CBRN defence, and military police support to Bundeswehr's four armed forces: Army, Navy, Air Force, and the Cyber and Information Domain Service. The Area is also responsible for the strategic development of the capabilities of the Bundeswehr, for civil-military cooperation, the multinational integration into NATO and the European Union, military music, sports promotion, the conceptual development of the reserve as well as tasks related to the Bundeswehr's veterans. On 1 April 2025, the Area took command of the units of the dissolved Joint Support Service and Joint Medical Service.

== Organization ==
The Bundeswehr Support Area consists of the following commands and units:

- Bundeswehr Support Command (Unterstützungskommando der Bundeswehr), in Bonn
  - Health Care Command (Kommando Gesundheitsversorgung), in Koblenz
    - Medical Operational Support Command (Kommando Sanitätsdienstliche Einsatzunterstützung), in Weißenfels
      - Medical Service Rapid Response Forces Command (Kommando Schnelle Einsatzkräfte Sanitätsdienst), in Leer
      - Medical Regiment 1 (Sanitätsregiment 1), in Weißenfels and Berlin
      - Medical Regiment 2 (Sanitätsregiment 2), in Rennerod and Koblenz
      - Medical Regiment 3 (Sanitätsregiment 3), in Dornstadt
      - Medical Regiment 4 (Sanitätsregiment 4), in Rheine
      - Medical Training Regiment (Sanitätslehrregiment), in Feldkirchen
      - Medical Materiel Supply and Maintenance Center Blankenburg (Versorgung- und Instandsetzungszentrum für Sanitätsmaterial Blankenburg), in Blankenburg
      - Medical Materiel Supply and Maintenance Center Pfungstadt (Versorgung- und Instandsetzungszentrum für Sanitätsmaterial Pfungstadt), in Pfungstadt
      - Medical Materiel Supply and Maintenance Center Quakenbrück (Versorgung- und Instandsetzungszentrum für Sanitätsmaterial Quakenbrück), in Quakenbrück
    - Regional Medical Support Command (Kommando Regionale Sanitätsdienstliche Unterstützung), in Diez
      - Bundeswehr Center for Sport Medicine (Zentrum für Sportmedizin der Bundeswehr), in Warendorf
      - Medical Support Center Augustdorf (Sanitätsunterstützungszentrum Augustdorf), in Augustdorf
      - Medical Support Center Berlin (Sanitätsunterstützungszentrum Berlin), in Berlin
      - Medical Support Center Cochem (Sanitätsunterstützungszentrum Cochem), in Cochem
      - Medical Support Center Erfurt (Sanitätsunterstützungszentrum Erfurt), in Erfurt
      - Medical Support Center Hammelburg (Sanitätsunterstützungszentrum Hammelburg), in Hammelburg
      - Medical Support Center Kiel (Sanitätsunterstützungszentrum Kiel), in Kiel
      - Medical Support Center Cologne (Sanitätsunterstützungszentrum Köln-Wahn), in Cologne
      - Medical Support Center Kümmersbruck (Sanitätsunterstützungszentrum Kümmersbruck), in Kümmersbruck
      - Medical Support Center Munich (Sanitätsunterstützungszentrum München), in Munich
      - Medical Support Center Munster (Sanitätsunterstützungszentrum Munster), in Munster
      - Medical Support Center Neubrandenburg (Sanitätsunterstützungszentrum Neubrandenburg), in Neubrandenburg
      - Medical Support Center Stetten am kalten Markt (Sanitätsunterstützungszentrum Stetten am kalten Markt), in Stetten am kalten Markt
      - Medical Support Center Wilhelmshaven (Sanitätsunterstützungszentrum Wilhelmshaven), in Wilhelmshaven
    - Bundeswehr Medical Academy (Sanitätsakademie der Bundeswehr), in Munich
      - Bundeswehr Institute for Pharmacology and Toxicology (Institut für Pharmakologie und Toxikologie der Bundeswehr), in Munich
      - Bundeswehr Institute for Microbiology (Institut für Mikrobiologie der Bundeswehr), in Munich
      - Bundeswehr Institute for Radiobiology (Institut für Radiobiologie der Bundeswehr), in Munich
    - Multinational Medical Coordination Center/European Medical Command, in Koblenz
    - Bundeswehr Medical Service Central Institute Kiel (Zentrales Institut des Sanitätsdienstes der Bundeswehr Kiel), in Kiel
    - Bundeswehr Medical Service Central Institute Munich (Zentrales Institut des Sanitätsdienstes der Bundeswehr München), in Munich
    - Bundeswehr Institute for Preventive Medicine (Institut für Präventivmedizin der Bundeswehr), in Andernach
    - Medical Service Public-legal Tasks Monitoring Post – North (Überwachungsstelle für öffentlich-rechtliche Aufgaben des Sanitätsdienstes – Nord), in Kronshagen
    - Medical Service Public-legal Tasks Monitoring Post – South (Überwachungsstelle für öffentlich-rechtliche Aufgaben des Sanitätsdienstes - Süd), in Munich
    - Medical Service Public-legal Tasks Monitoring Post – West (Überwachungsstelle für öffentlich-rechtliche Aufgaben des Sanitätsdienstes – West), in Koblenz
    - Medical Service Public-legal Tasks Monitoring Post – East (Überwachungsstelle für öffentlich-rechtliche Aufgaben des Sanitätsdienstes – Ost), in Potsdam
  - Bundeswehr CBRN-defence Command (ABC-Abwehrkommando der Bundeswehr), in Bruchsal
    - CBRN-defence Regiment 1 (ABC-Abwehrregiment 1), in Strausberg
    - CBRN-defence Battalion 7 (ABC-Abwehrbataillon 7), in Höxter
    - CBRN-defence Battalion 750 (ABC-Abwehrbataillon 750), in Bruchsal
    - CBRN-defence and Legal Protection Tasks School (Schule ABC-Abwehr und Gesetzliche Schutzaufgaben), in Sonthofen and Stetten am kalten Markt
  - Bundeswehr Logistic Command (Logistikkommando der Bundeswehr)
    - Logistic Regiment 1 (Logistikregiment 1), in Burg bei Magdeburg
      - Logistic Battalion 161 (Logistikbataillon 161), in Delmenhorst
      - Logistic Battalion 163 (Logistikbataillon 163), in Delmenhorst
      - Logistic Battalion 171 (Logistikbataillon 171), in Burg bei Magdeburg
      - Logistic Battalion 172 (Logistikbataillon 172), in Beelitz
    - Logistic Regiment 4 (Logistikregiment 4), in Volkach
      - Logistic Battalion 461 (Logistikbataillon 461), in Walldürn
      - Logistic Battalion 467 (Logistikbataillon 467), in Volkach
      - Logistic Battalion 471 (Logistikbataillon 471), in Osterheide
      - Logistic Battalion 472 (Logistikbataillon 472), in Kümmersbruck
    - Special Engineer Regiment 164 (Spezialpionierregiments 164), in Husum
    - Bundeswehr Logistic School (Logistikschule der Bundeswehr), in Osterholz-Scharmbeck
    - Bundeswehr Logistic Center (Logistikzentrum der Bundeswehr), in Wilhelmshaven
    - Bundeswehr Motor Vehicles Center (Zentrum Kraftfahrwesen der Bundeswehr), in Mönchengladbach
  - Bundeswehr Military Police Command (Kommando Feldjäger der Bundeswehr), in Hanover
    - Military Police Regiment 1 (Feldjägerregiment 1), in Berlin
      - 1× Staff/Supply Company and 9× Feldjäger companies located in Berlin, Brandenburg, Saxony, Saxony-Anhalt, Mecklenburg-Vorpommern, Hamburg, and Schleswig-Holstein
    - Military Police Regiment 2 (Feldjägerregiment 2), in Hilden
      - 1× Staff/Supply Company and 8× Feldjäger companies located in Bremen, Hesse, Lower Saxony, North Rhine-Westphalia, Rhineland-Palatinate, and Saarland
    - Military Police Regiment 3 (Feldjägerregiment 3), in Munich
      - 1× Staff/Supply Company and 8× Feldjäger companies located in Bavaria, Baden-Württemberg, and Thuringia
    - Guard Battalion at the Federal Ministry of Defence (Wachbataillon beim Bundesministerium der Verteidigung), in Berlin
    - School for Military Police and Staff Service (Schule für Feldjäger und Stabsdienst), in Hanover
  - Armed Forces Office (Streitkräfteamt), in Bonn
    - Bundeswehr Command USA and Canada (Bundeswehrkommando USA und Kanada), in Reston, Virginia
    - German Delegation Netherlands (Deutsche Delegation Niederlande), at the Allied Joint Force Command Brunssum in Brunssum, Netherlands
    - George C. Marshall Center (German Part) (George C. Marshall Center (Deutscher Anteil)), in Garmisch-Partenkirchen
    - Senior German Officer/German Part NATO School Oberammergau (Dienstältester Deutscher Offizier/Deutscher Anteil NATO School Oberammergau), in Oberammergau
    - Integrated SASPF Specialisation and Training Center (Integriertes Fach- und Ausbilderzentrum SASPF (Standard-Anwendungs-Software-Produkt-Familien)), in Aachen
    - Bundeswehr School for Service Dogs (Schule für Diensthundewesen der Bundeswehr), in Ulmen
    - Bundeswehr Sport School (Sportschule der Bundeswehr), in Warendorf
    - Bundeswehr Public Relations Center (Zentrum Informationsarbeit Bundeswehr), in Strausberg
    - Bundeswehr Military Music Center (Zentrum Militärmusik der Bundeswehr), in Bonn
    - Bundeswehr Center for Verification Tasks (Zentrum für Verifikationsaufgaben der Bundeswehr), in Geilenkirchen
    - Bundeswehr Technical Information Support (Fachinformationsunterstützung der Bundeswehr), in Bonn
  - Multinational Operations Command / Multinational Joint Headquarters Ulm (Multinationale Kommando Operative Führung / Multinational Joint Headquarters Ulm), in Ulm
  - Civil-Military Cooperation Command (Kommando Zivil-Militärische Zusammenarbeit), in Nienburg
  - Bundeswehr Office for Defence Planning (Planungsamt der Bundeswehr), in Berlin
  - Federal Academy for Security Policy (Bundesakademie für Sicherheitspolitik), at the Schönhausen Palace in Berlin
