= Wolfram Kühn =

German Navy vice admiral (born 1952)

- Born: 7 November 1952 (age 73); Bad Schwartau, Schleswig-Holstein, West Germany
- Military career
- Allegiance: West Germany (to 1990); Germany
- Branch: German Navy
- Service years: 1972–2012
- Rank: Vizeadmiral
- Commands: Deputy Inspector General of the Bundeswehr; Inspector of the Joint Support Service; CS Armed Forces Staff
- Awards: Cross of the Order of Merit of the Federal Republic of Germany

Wolfram Kühn (born 7 November 1952) is a retired German Navy vice admiral. He served as Deputy Inspector General of the Bundeswehr and Inspector of the Joint Support Service from 2006 to his retirement in 2012.

== Military career ==
Kühn entered the Bundeswehr in 1972. After basic naval officer training, he studied Economics and Business Administration at the University of the Bundeswehr Munich. After graduating in 1977, he served on the Destroyer Schleswig-Holstein as a CIC officer. In 1979, he was promoted to Kapitänleutnant (captain lieutenant) and assigned to the Territorial Command of Schleswig-Holstein as Adjutant of the commander, who was also the highest German responsible within NATO's Allied Forces Northern Europe (AFNORTH). From 1982 to 1984, Kühn served as department head of the supply department on Frigate Rheinland-Pfalz. Selected for the Admiral Staff Officer Course at the Führungsakademie der Bundeswehr it was during this course that he was promoted to Korvettenkapitän (corvette captain).

From 1986 to 1987, Kühn served as an instructor and company commander at the Navy Supply School in List (Sylt). From 1988 to 1989, he again was posted at the Territorial Command of Schleswig-Holstein, this time as a logistics staff officer (G4). Later he served at the Ministry of Defense in Bonn until 1991. From 1991 until 1993, Kühn was assigned to the Navy Supply School as Division Commander and Vice Commander of the school. During the next two years he again served at the Ministry of Defense within the Navy Staff and was responsible for general issues, logistics and procurement. In 1994, he studied at the Defence Resources Management Institute (DRMI) of the Naval Postgraduate School in Monterey, California.

Back in Germany from 1994 to 1997, he served as Chief Financial Officer in the Navy Support Command in Wilhelmshaven. From 1997 to 1998, he studied at the National War College in Washington, D.C. and gained a Master of Science in National Security Strategy. From 1998 to 2001, he was assigned to the Federal Ministry of Defence as a section chief. From 2001 to 2002, Kühn served as Chief of Staff of the Joint Support Command. From 2002 to 2002, he was Staff Department Chief in the Navy Staff. In 2004, he was Chief of Staff of the Inspector General of the Bundeswehr. In 2006, he was promoted to Vizeadmiral (vice admiral) and appointed Inspector of the Joint Support Service and Deputy Inspector General of the Bundeswehr. On 28 March 2012, Kühn handed over his post to Manfred Nielson, his retirement from military service marked by a Großer Zapfenstreich.
