= Armed Forces Staff (Germany) =

Formerly one of the five staff headquarters of the German Bundeswehr

Coordinates: 50.699203°N 7.040541°E

- Führungsstab der Streitkräfte (Fü S) im BMVg
- Formation sign of the Fü S
- Active: November 1955–October 2012
- Country: Germany
- Allegiance: Bundeswehr
- Type: Dept. of Inspector General of the Bundeswehr
- Size: 300
- Location: Hardthöhe, Bonn, North Rhine-Westphalia
- Website: www.bmvg.de

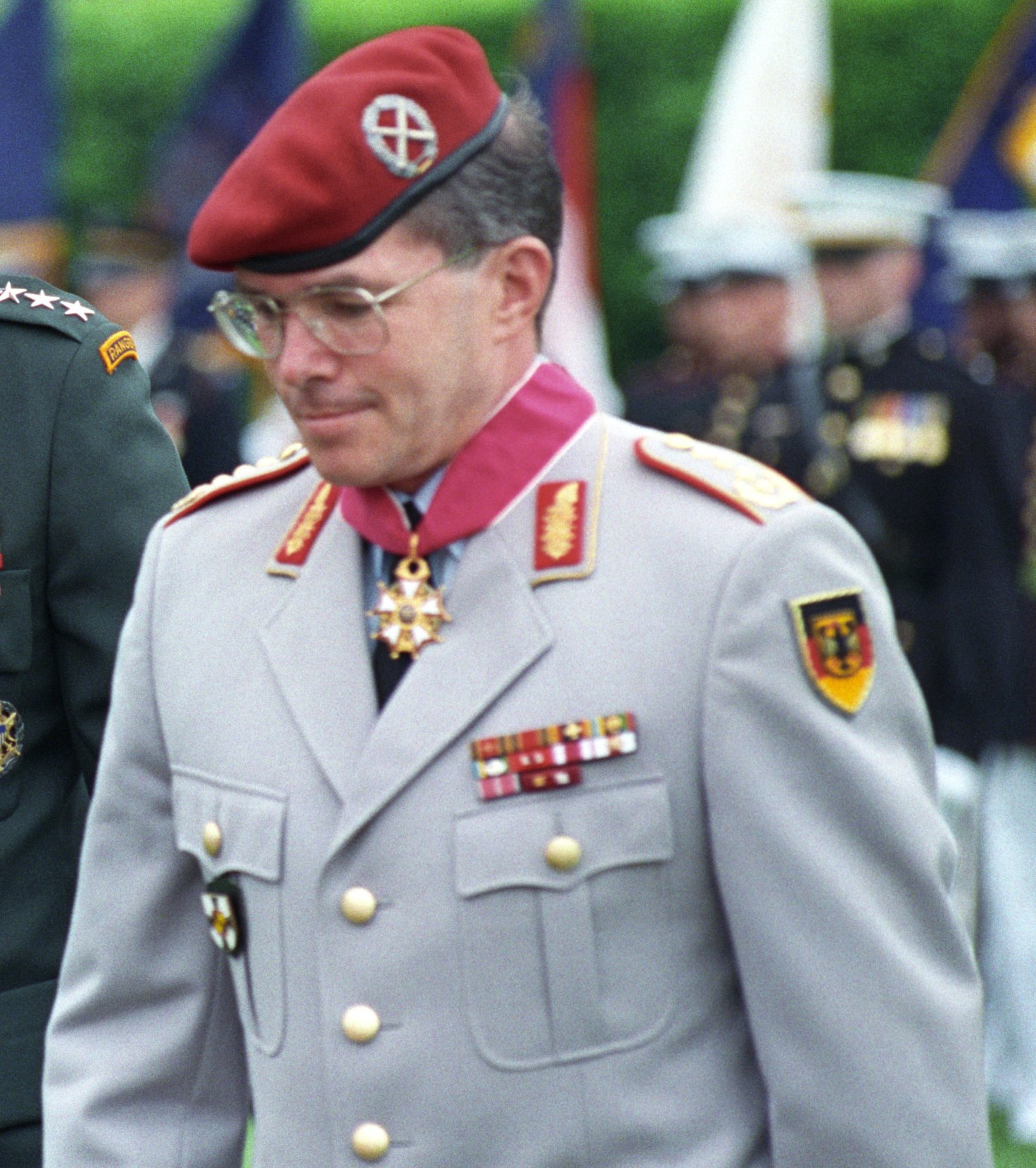
General Naumann with Formation sign Fü S und cuff sign.

The Armed Forces Staff, in the meaning of General staff, of the German Bundeswehr (German: Führungsstab der Streitkräfte - Fü S; literal: Command staff of the armed forces) was the central department of the Federal Ministry of Defence (MOD) in direct subordination to the Inspector General of the Bundeswehr (en: Chief of Staff of the Federal Armed Forces) and one of the five staff headquarters in the military command of the German Bundeswehr.

The Armed Forces Staff was thus at the same time a supreme military command authority and the top level ministerial staff organisation, authorised, mandated and competent to overall military defence planning, basics and concepts of military policy, planning of operational command and control, as well as to plans a policy of personnel education and training.

In 2012, there existed supreme military command authorities in the MOD as follows:

- Armed Forces Staff (Führungsstab der Streitkräfte – Fü S; General Staff of the Armed Forces)
- Army Staff (Führungsstab des Heeres – Fü H; Army General Staff)
- Air Force Staff (Führungsstab der Luftwaffe – Fü L; Air Force General Staff)
- Navy Staff (Führungsstab der Marine – Fü M)
- Medical Staff (Führungsstab des Sanitätsdienstes – Fü San; Medical Service Staff)

Parts of these top-level staff authorities were merged in order to establish the new high command authorities of the German Bundeswehr as follow:

- Army Command (Kommando Heer – Kdo Heer)
- Air Force Command (Kommando Luftwaffe – Kdo Luftwaffe)
- Navy Command (Kommando Marine – Kdo Marine)

In line to the new Bundeswehr command structure, the remaining staff elements were used on the MOD level to form:

- a Planning Division
- an Armed Forces Command and Control Division and
- a Strategy and Operations Division.

== History ==
After World War II 1945 and in accordance with the Potsdam Agreement the establishment of autonomous German armed forces, including headquarters on general staff level, were forbidden. However, in line to the re-armament from Mai 5, 1955, in the new established Bundeswehr the designation Generalstab (general staff) was not more used, thus there existed tasks and missions on general staff level. This was the reason to establish the Armed Forces Staff as top level command organization in the MOD.

== Mission ==
The Armed Forces Staff received tasks and orders direct from the Inspector General of the Bundeswehr. In addition, it was within its responsibility to handle command and control specific affairs, related to the Armed forces basic. This characterised the Armed Forces Staff as supreme military command authority.

== Command ==
The Inspector General of the Bundeswehr (German: Generalinspekteur der Bundeswehr, GenInspBw), a four-star rank (general or admiral), commanded the Armed Forces Staff. The Chief of Staff coordinated the staff work. According to the so-called Bundeswehr planning he was authorised to issue directives to the Inspectors General of the services Army, Air Force, and Navy, as well as to Inspector of the Joint Support Service Staff and Medical Service Staff.

June 1, 2003, the Armed Forces Staff and Joint Support Service Staff' were combined into a common staff authority in the MOD.

== Organisation ==
The Armed Forces Staff consisted of seven staff divisions (7 Stabsabteilungen) with a total number of 42 branches (42 Referate).

- Staff division Fü S I – The chief of that particular division was Deputy Chief of Staff – Civic education and leadership, personnel, training, with the branches:
  - Fü S I/1 – Principles of manning requirements
  - Fü S I/2 – Basics of personnel planning, personnel situation, and recruitment situation of civil and military personnel of the armed forces, reserve component issues
  - Fü S I/3 – Internal and social situation of the armed forces
  - Fü S I/4 – Civic education and leadership
  - Fü S I/5 – Basic training affairs of the armed forces
- Staff division Fü S II – Military intelligence of the Bundeswehr, with the branches:
  - Fü S II/1 – Basic affairs and concept of military intelligence
  - Fü S II/2 – Strategic reconnaissance; security officer of signal, electronic, and special reconnaissance; control authority of the Chief of Air Force Staff to military intelligence
  - Fü S II/3 – National risk evaluation; situation of other states; control authority of the Chief of Army Staff to military intelligence
  - Fü S II/4 – Military security of the Bundeswehr; control authority of the Chief of Navy Staff to military intelligence
  - Fü S II/5 – Foreign military attachés; situation of other states
  - Fü S II/6 – Geographic information system of the Bundeswehr; navigation in the Bundewehr
- Staff division Fü S III – Military policy and armament control, with the branches
  - Fü S III/1 – Basics of military policy; bilateral relations
  - Fü S III/2 – Basics of military strategy; German-French working group on military cooperation; studiesFA 01
  - Fü S III/2 – NATO; Euro Atlantic Partnership Council (EAPC); basic questions of military representation of the interest in organizations; Partnership for Peace (PfP)
  - Fü S III/3 – European Union; Western European Union; basic questions of military representation of the interest in these organizations; European control officer of MOD Germany
  - Fü S III/4 – Arms control; disarmament; non-distribution
  - Fü S III/5 – Military political basics on operations and exercises
- Staff division Fü S IV – Logistics, ABC-Defence and security tasks
  - Fü S IV/1 – Basic matters of logistics of the Bundeswehr; logistic control of the Bundeswehr; international logistic cooperation
  - Fü S IV/2 – Material / supply management of the Bundeswehr
  - Fü S IV/3 – ABC-Defence and security tasks of the Bundeswehr; training areas and local training facilities
  - Fü S IV/4 – Mobility and transport logistic of the Bundeswehr
  - Fü S IV/5 – Planning of the Bundeswehr; armament and in service support management of the armed forces; authorized representative of IAGFA
- Staff division Fü S V – Commitment (also: engagement or mission) of the Bundeswehr; from June 1, 2008, reorganised to Operations Control Staff of the Federal Ministry of Defence (Einsatzführungsstab des Bundesministeriums der Verteidigung) in direct subordination to the Inspector General of the Bundeswehr and not any more part of the Armed Forces Staff
- Staff division Fü S VI – Planning, with the branches:
  - Fü S VI/1 – Basic affairs and controlling Bundeswehr planning, process responsibility main process Bundeswehr planning, BRH-affairs Armed Forces Staff / Joint Support Service (Fü S / SKB)
  - Fü S VI/2 – Conception of the Bundeswehr, transformation CD&E
  - Fü S VI/3 – Capability analysis
  - Fü S VI/4 – Bundeswehr planning
  - Fü S VI/5 – Contributions to the budget and finance planning of the armed forces/Joint Support Service; coordination management of the armed forces
  - Fü S VI/6 – Multinational armed forces planning, capability development, interoperability/standardisation;
  - Fü S VI/7 – Basics/further development of the armed forces
- Staff division Fü S VII – Organisation, deployment, infrastructure, operations support, with the branches:
  - Fü S VII/1 – Basic affairs of the military organisation; business dealings, correspondence or exchange of letters in the armed forces; regulations and standardisation agreements
  - Fü S VII/2 – Organisation of the Joint Support Service
  - Fü S VII/3 – Coordination of the deployment of the Bundeswehr and utilisation of premises; deployment of the armed forces basis; enquiry group optimizing of locations and premises
  - Fü S VII/4 – Basic affairs of infrastructure of the armed forces; infrastructure requirements and – planning of the armed forces
  - Fü S VII/5 – Information and communication technology; radio frequency spectrum prerogative affairs

== List Chiefs of Staff ==
The Chief of staff did normally have the OF7-rank of a Generalmajors or Konteradmiral.

N°	Rank name	Time in office	
N°	Rank name	Start	End
25	Generalmajor Peter Bohrer	July 1, 2010	March 31, 2012
24	Konteradmiral Manfred Nielson	February 21, 2008	July 1, 2010
23	Generalmajor Manfred Engelhardt	April 20, 2006	February 20, 2008
22	Konteradmiral Wolfram Kühn	February 12, 2004	April 20, 2006
21	Generalmajor Egon Ramms	October 1, 2000	February 12, 2004
20	Konteradmiral Jörg Auer	October 1, 1999	September 30, 2000
19	Generalmajor Hartmut Moede	October 1, 1997	September 30, 1999
18	Generalmajor Benno Ertmann	December 16, 1994	September 29, 1997
17	Konteradmiral Hans Frank	April 1, 1992	December 15, 1994
16	Generalmajor Peter Haarhaus	October 1, 1989	Märch 31, 1992
15	Generalmajor Dr. Jürgen Schnell	1. October 1, 1987	September 30, 1989
14	Generalmajor Siegfried Storbeck	October 1, 1986	September 30, 1987
13	Konteradmiral Klaus Rehder	April 1, 1983	September 30, 1986
12	Konteradmiral Rudolf Arendt	April 1, 1980	March 31, 1983
11	Konteradmiral Helmut Kampe	January 10, 1977	March 31, 1980
10	Generalmajor Lothar Domröse	October 1, 1975	January 9, 1977
9	Generalmajor Ernst-Dieter Bernhard	April 1, 1973	September 30, 1975
8	Generalmajor Harald Wust	May 1, 1971	March 31, 1974
7	Generalmajor Bernd Freytag von Loringhoven	April 1, 1971	April 30, 1971
6	Konteradmiral Günter Reeder	October 1, 1968	March 31, 1971
5	Konteradmiral Albrecht Obermaier	April 1, 1967	September 30, 1968
4	Generalmajor Herbert Büchs	July 1, 1964	March 31, 1967
3	Generalmajor Gustav-Adolf Kuntzen	October 1, 1962	June 30, 1964
2	Generalmajor Albert Schnez	April 1, 1960	September 30, 1962
1	Generalmajor Werner Panitzki	January 10, 1958	March 31, 1960
