= Kommando Zivil-Militärische Zusammenarbeit =

Coordinates: 52.61313°N 9.25338°E

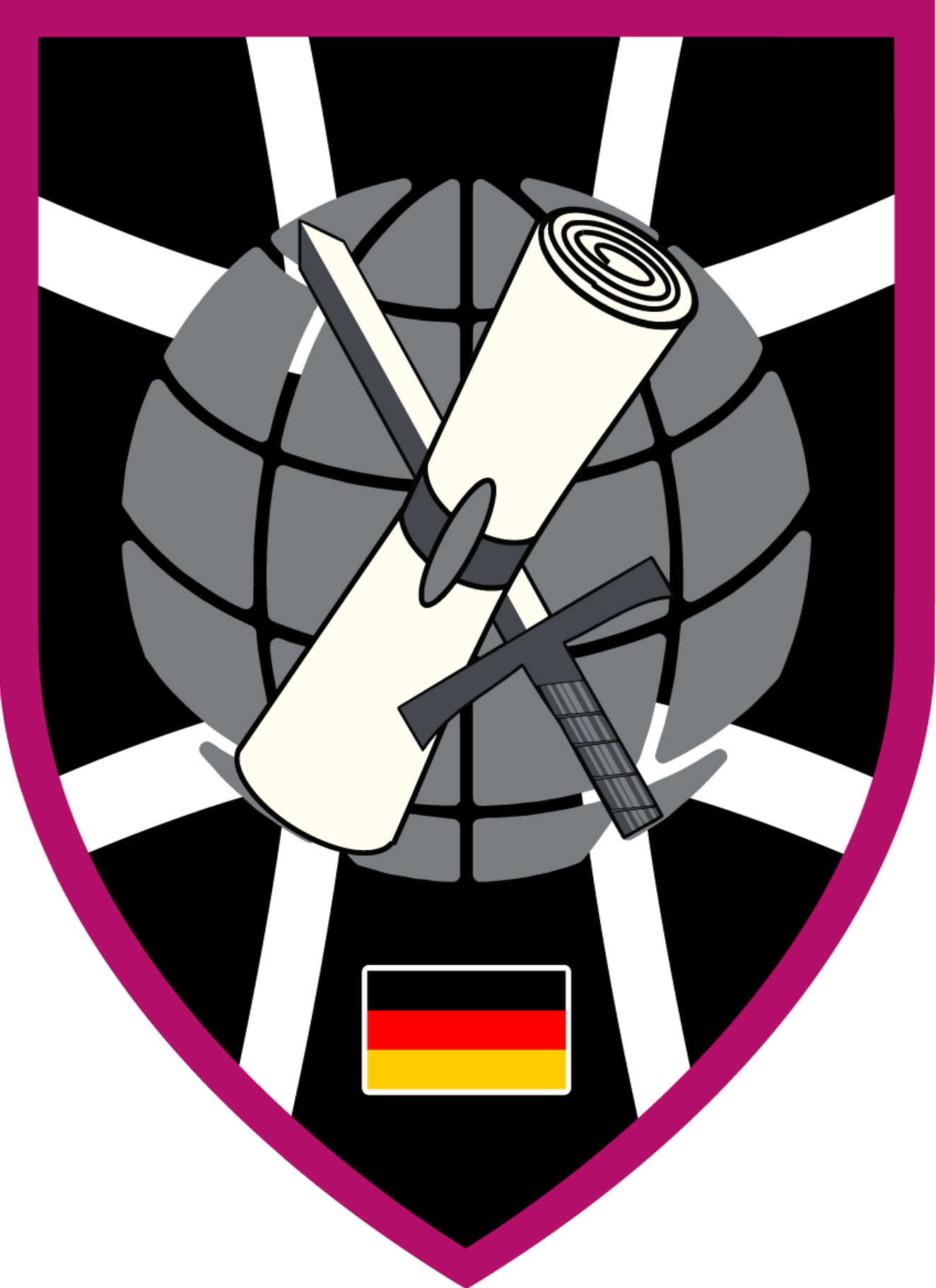
- Coat of Arms Multinational Civil-Military Cooperation Command
- Active: 2003/2006/2013/2019/2025, active
- Country: Germany
- Branch: SuccessorJoint Support Service
- Type: Training Centre, Deployment of CIMIC-Forces
- Role: Civil-military co-operation
- Size: 200
- Part of: German Army
- Engagements: ISAF and Resolute Support (RS), KFOR, European Training Mission Somalia (EUTM SOM) and European Forces Republic Central Africa, plus Missions in the Balkans

Commanders
- Current commander: Colonel Stefan Hofmaier

The Kommando Zivil-Militärische Zusammenarbeit (short: KdoZMZBw), ger. for Command Civil Military Cooperation, is the fifth generation of Civil-military co-operation of the Bundeswehr. The first predecessor was already formed in 2001 out of parts of the German Army (Heer), the German Air Force (Luftwaffe) and the German Navy (Deutsche Marine) as part of the Joint Support Service (Streitkräftebasis) at the Clausewitz-Barracks in Nienburg, Lower Saxony. In 2017 it employs around 200 soldiers and Civil Servants Additional to this the centre receives support by the local state commands (Landeskommando) of the States of Germany (Bundesländer) and the academy of the Federal Office for Civil Protection and Disaster Assistance in Bad Neuenahr.

== History ==
=== First Generation: CIMIC Battalion (CIMIC Bataillon) (founded 28. März 2003) ===
During the SFOR mission in Bosnia and Herzegovina it became clear that future missions will involve the civil population, NGOs and GOs. This was a major difference to Cold War-scenarios in which the population was considered to be evacuated. This challenge lead to the foundation of CIMIC Bataillon 100, which concentrated the expertise. The gravity point lay on the resettlement of refugees and rebuilding the infrastructure.

=== Second Generation: CIMIC-Centre (CIMIC-Zentrum) (founded: 4. Mai 2006) ===
The task of the CIMIC-Zentrum was tied close to the necessities of the missions abroad. The gravity point moved away from building infrastructure towards a better assessment of the military situation and a better counseling of the military leaders as well as civil organisations, which is in accordance to the three core-tasks of CIMIC in the definition of NATO. Additional to this the training of experts in the Zentrum began. The development remained until its liquidation at the Joint Service Command (Streitkräfteunterstützungskommando, short SKUKdo) when it moved to the CIMIC-Zentrum.

=== Third Generation: Centre for Civil-Military Cooperation of the Bundeswehr (Zentrum Zivil-Militärische Zusammenarbeit der Bundeswehr) (founded: 26. November 2013) ===
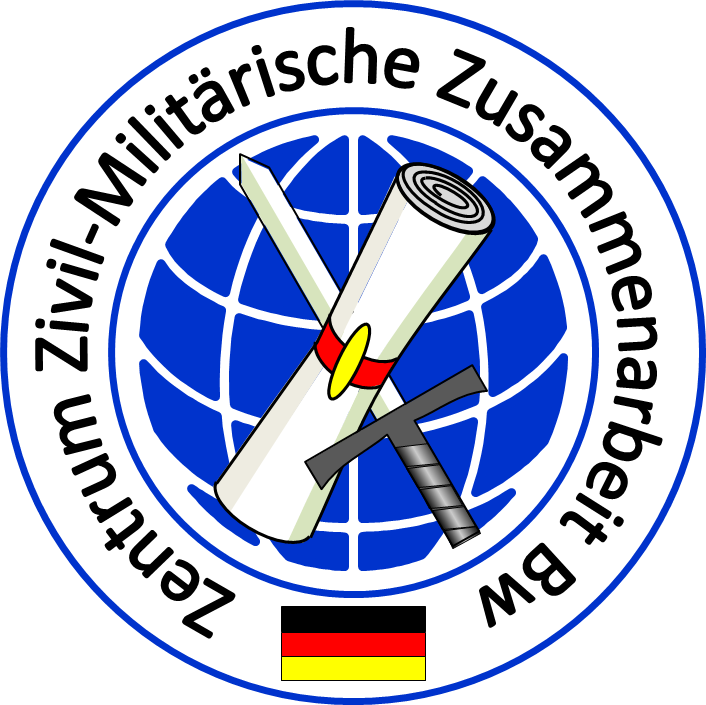
Coat of Arms Zentrum ZMZ

The Zentrum Zivil-Militärische Zusammenarbeit der Bundeswehr (ZentrZMZBw) is the centre of CIMIC and under the leadership of the Bundeswehr Territorial Tasks Command (Kommando Territoriale Aufgaben der Bundeswehr, KdoTerrAufgBw). The field of action widened to the civil-military cooperation in Germany itself. The methods are getting improved by scientific research. Furthermore, the Zentrum cooperates with comparable international organisations like the Civil-Military Cooperation Centre of Excellence of NATO in The Hague. Since 2009 it is annually hosting NATOs biggest CIMIC exercise Joint Cooperation which is conducted in Nienburg district and neighboring counties. In 2017 about 350 soldiers out of 23 Nations trained at the Zentrum together with German Emergency Management units and a big number of role players who mainly played their real live tasks.

=== Fourth Generation: Multinational CIMIC Command (founded: 30. September 2019) ===
On September 30, 2019, the ZentrumZMZBw was regrouped to Multinational CIMIC Command (MN CIMIC Cmd) which will concentrate even stronger on common missions with EU and NATO and will furthermore include international parts. The backgrounds were, that the Framework Nations Concept (FNC) foresaw Germany as leadnation in CIMIC, the ZentrumZMZBw already conducted multinational courses and hosted the JOINT COOPERATION which is the biggest CIMIC-Exercise worldwide, so that there already were the necessary backgrounds.

=== Fifth Generation: Kommando Zivil-Militärische Zusammenarbeit (founded: 01. April 2025) ===
On April 1, 2025 the Command was transformed concerning the reorganisation of the Bundeswehr.
