= Albrecht Obermaier =

German naval officer (1912–2004)

- Born: 9 July 1912; Freising, Bavaria, German Empire
- Died: 1 August 2004 (aged 92) Feldafing, Bavaria, Germany
- Allegiance: Nazi Germany; West Germany
- Branch: Kriegsmarine; German Navy
- Service years: 1933–1945; 1956–1971
- Rank: Vizeadmiral
- Commands: CS Armed Forces Staff; 6th Fast Attack Craft Flotilla; Zerstörer 5; Naval Command North Sea; Naval Central Command; Navy Office; Naval Forces Baltic Approaches
- Conflicts: World War II

Albrecht Obermaier (9 July 1912 – 1 August 2004) was a German naval officer who served in the Kriegsmarine in World War II, and in the postwar Navy of West Germany. He reached the rank of Vizeadmiral (vice admiral), serving as the first chief of the Navy Office, and as commander of Naval Forces Baltic Approaches for NATO.

== Career ==
Obermaier began his education in the German merchant marine in 1931, and twice circumnavigated twice Cape Horn in a sailing ship. In 1933, he joined the new Kriegsmarine of Nazi Germany. During World War II, he was an officer in fast attack craft units, reaching the rank of Korvettenkapitän (lieutenant commander). From March 1941 to July 1944, he commanded the 6th Fast Attack Craft Flotilla (German: 6. Schnellbootsflottille), which was used in the North Sea and the English Channel. After the war he worked as a sales representative, and served as an advisor to the Egyptian Navy.

In 1956, Obermaier joined the new Bundesmarine. Initially, he served at the Federal Ministry of Defence. In 1959, he was made head of the command responsible for commissioning of naval craft, and in 1960 he became the first commander of Zerstörer 5 (the former U.S. Navy destroyer Dyson), which he led until the end of 1961. In January 1964, he was promoted to Flottillenadmiral (flotilla admiral) and made commander of the Naval Command North Sea (German: Marineabschnittskommando Nordsee).

In October 1964, Obermaier was promoted to Konteradmiral (rear admiral), and made commander of Naval Central Command (German: Zentrales Marinekommando), serving until September 1965. In March 1966, he was appointed the first head of the Navy Office. In December 1966, he was appointed Deputy Commander of the Fleet, and from April 1967 to September 1968 he was the Chief of Staff of the German Defence Staff, serving under Inspector General Ulrich de Maizière. In October 1968, Obermaier was promoted to Vizeadmiral (vice admiral) and took up the command of Commander, Naval Forces Baltic Approaches, based at Karup in Denmark. He served in this position until his retirement in 1971.

Military offices
New title	Chief of the Navy Office; 1 October 1965–31 March 1966	Succeeded by Konteradmiral Günter Kuhnke
