= Kommando Territoriale Aufgaben der Bundeswehr =

Coordinates: 52.558338°N 13.321864°E

„Kommando Territoriale Aufgaben der Bundeswehr — KdoTerrAufgBw — ("Bundeswehr Territorial Tasks Command")
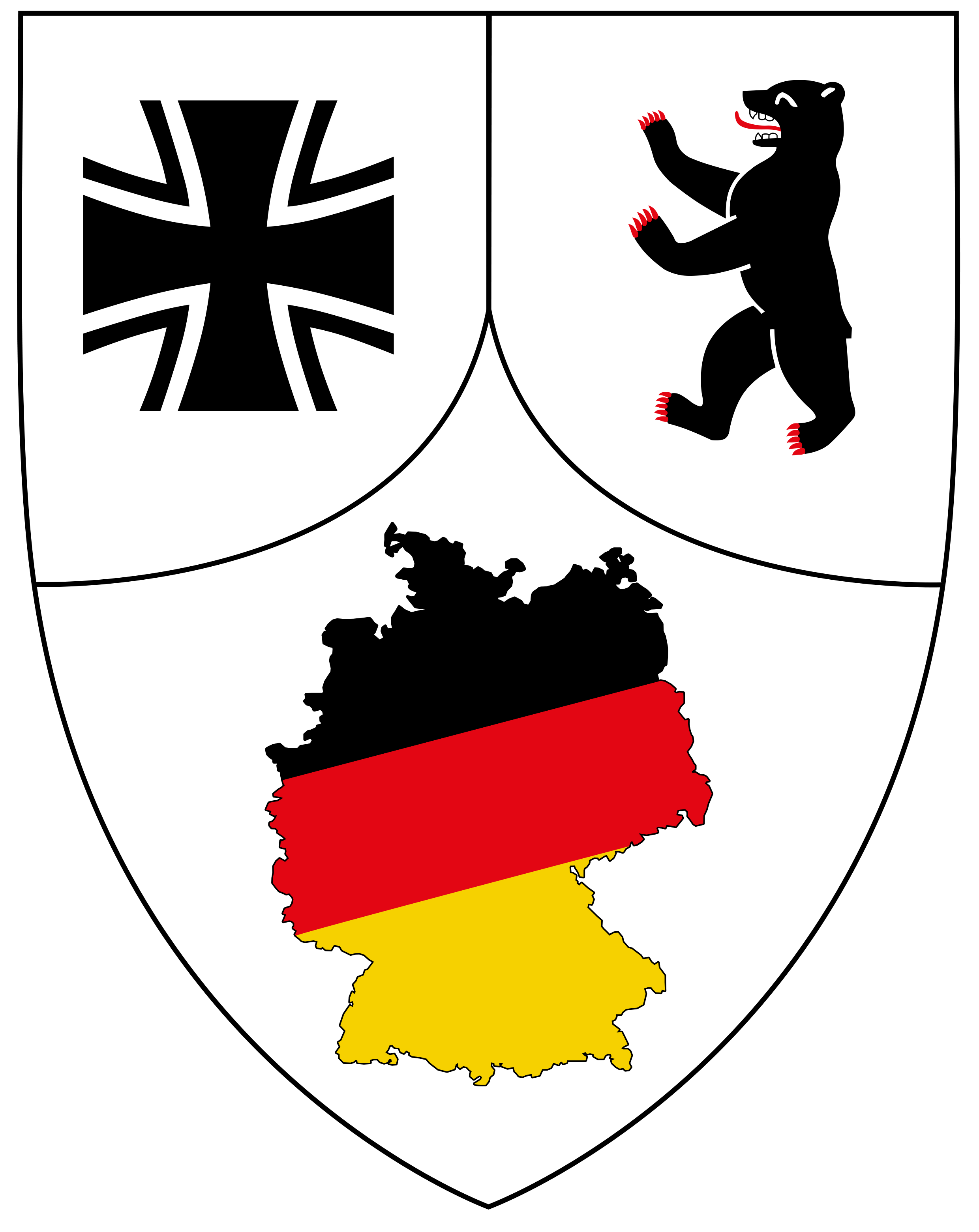
- Active: January 24th, 2013
- Country: Germany
- Branch: Joint Support Service
- Type: Territorial Command
- Size: 200
- Part of: German Army
- Garrison/HQ: Julius Leber Barracks

The Kommando Territoriale Aufgaben der Bundeswehr short (KdoTerrAufgBw) "Bundeswehr Territorial Tasks Command" of the Bundeswehr is based in the Julius Leber Barracks in Berlin-Wedding was founded in 2013 and is in charge of all territorial tasks of the forces as well as for the support of the civil administration.

== Organisation ==
The Kommando Territoriale Aufgaben der Bundeswehr is under the command of the Streitkräftebasis (SKB) (Joint Support Service) and leads the following tasks on its behalf:

- 16 Landeskommandos (LKdo) (including, in Bayern, Landesregiment Bayern)
  - Local reservist companies (de:Regionale Sicherungs- und Unterstützungskräfte (RSUKr))
  - Professional Sportsmen of the Bundeswehr (SpFördGrpBw)
- Multinational CIMIC Command (MN CIMIC CMD) in Nienburg/Weser
- Wachbataillon (WachBtl BMVg)
- Proving grounds of the Bundeswehr (TrÜbPl)

The Kommando Territoriale Aufgaben der Bundeswehr besides the Führungsunterstützungskommando der Bundeswehr and the Logistikkommando der Bundeswehr one of three new established Ability-Commands of the Joint Support Service (SKB). It is an equivalent to a Division.
