= Hardthöhe (barracks) =

- Hardthöhe district, Bonn

Site information
- Type: Military headquarters
- Controlled by: Germany

Site history
- In use: 1955–present
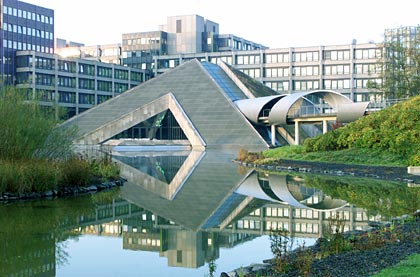
- Interactive map of Hardthöhe
- Coordinates: 50°42′4″N 7°2′45″E
- Country: Germany
- City: Bonn

Population
  - Total: 5,000

Hardthöhe in Bonn is the primary headquarters of the Federal Ministry of Defense of Germany. The secondary headquarters is the Bendlerblock in Berlin. The Hardthöhe property is located in the Bonn district of Hardthöhe, whose entire area it occupies. The barracks were built starting in 1956. Approximately 1,500 Federal Ministry employees work there, including subordinate offices totaling approximately 5,000 in 113 buildings. The main entrance to the Hardthöhe property is the North Guard Station on Fontainengraben. Additional entrances include the South Guard Station on Brüser Damm and the East Guard Station on Pascalstraße. The streets and squares on the site have been named after German cities since the fall of 1990.

== History ==
The rearmament of West Germany was organized by Konrad Adenauer from the “Amt Blank”, named after its boss Theodor Blank. The staff was initially housed in the Ermekeil barracks in the south of Bonn. From 1956 onwards, a modern barracks for around 1,000 people was built for the new ministry on a hill in the Hardtberg district. From the 1960s onwards, additional buildings and office buildings were built on the 80 hectare area to accommodate the increasing number of employees. The large central area alone covers an area of around 50,000 square meters.

On June 7, 1955, the so-called "Blank Office" was transformed into the Federal Ministry of Defense. Around the same time, planning began for the construction of buildings for the ministry on Hardthöhe. This site had previously been a military training area. Initially, the ministry still used the rooms used by the Blank Office in the Ermekeil Barracks in Bonn, making this barracks the first headquarters of the Ministry of Defense. The plans for the new buildings on Hardthöhe met with criticism from the opposition. In early 1956, the SPD called for a halt to the construction of new administrative buildings. According to SPD MP Heinrich Ritzel, the federal buildings in Bonn had assumed a larger scale than originally planned, and in the event of a government move to Berlin, a subsequent use for these buildings was unclear. The Food, Beverages and Catering Union stated that 750 new apartments could be built in place of the barracks. However, the government under Konrad Adenauer pushed through the start of work.

=== 1,000-Man Barracks ===
Starting in 1956, a barracks complex with two- and three-story buildings with gable roofs was initially built. Due to its planned capacity, this complex was designated the 1,000-Man Barracks by the government. It was the first post-war barracks in the Federal Republic of Germany. The complex, located at Fontainengraben 150, is now a listed building. Due to the layout of the buildings, it was also called the "Wagenburg" (Wagon Train), probably also because the complex lacked a hierarchy: The decentralized layout of the buildings, without special structures for military ranks, and the U-shaped layout with a central green area, created a barracks complex that demonstrated the efforts of the young Federal Republic to implement "the newly acquired understanding of democracy in individual, urbanistically and architecturally relaxed orders". This construction method was used for the first time in a German barracks complex and set the standard for other new barracks construction in Germany. An addendum to the federal budget for 1956 estimated the total cost of the complex at DM 16.2 million (Title: 751).

The complex, which was constructed at great expense, was inaugurated by the then Minister of Defense, Theodor Blank, in June 1956. At that time, Hardthöhe still belonged to Duisdorf; its incorporation into Bonn only took place in 1969. The barracks buildings were not used by the troops, but only as offices for some outsourced departments of the Ministry of Defense.

=== Federal Ministry of Defense ===
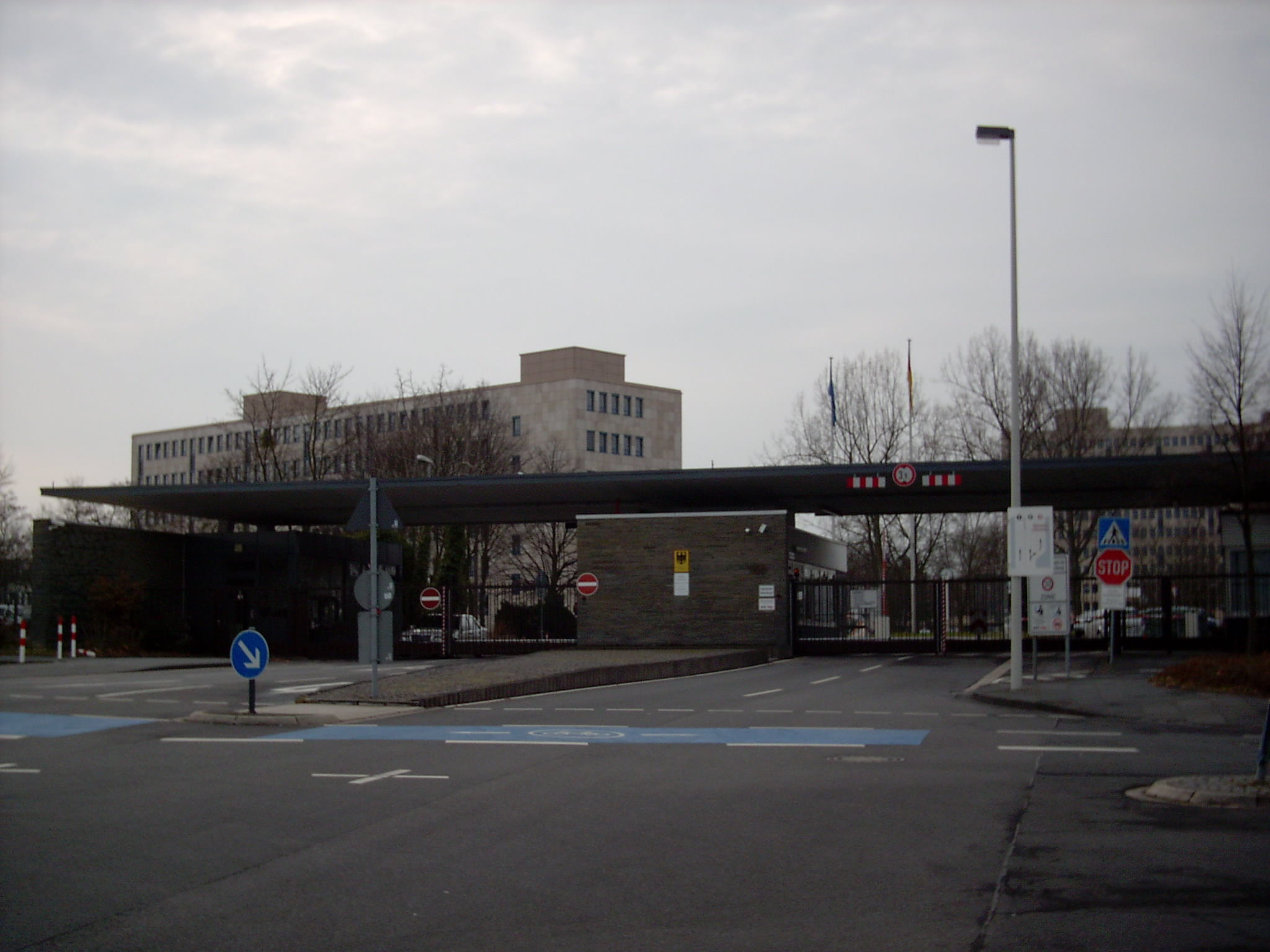
North guard of Hardthöhe (condition before the renovation completed in 2011)

In 1960, the Ministry began relocating from the Ermekeil Barracks to the Hardthöhe. Additional buildings were built alongside the existing ones. The move took place in 1960 under Defense Minister Franz Josef Strauss.

When the Federal Ministry of Defense began planning its relocation from the Ermekeil Barracks to the Hardthöhe in 1960, a former military training area and a barracks designed like a settlement already existed there. This "1,000-man" barracks, also known as the "Wagenburg," was built in 1956 and adjacent to four office buildings with gable roofs. By the mid-1960s, the Federal Building Directorate had built five six-story, interconnected office buildings ("200 Buildings"), a ten-story high-rise, a three-story so-called "Minister Building," a casino building, and a two-story conference hall building for a total of approximately 3,500 employees. From 1966 to 1968, the then main office of the Mechanical Engineering Reporting Department was built in the south, and from 1967 to 1968, a medical center was built in the west (architects: Ernst van Dorp, among others). The central entrance and guard building (North Guard) was built in 1969 in the north of the site. In 1971, the troop area for the Staff and Supply Battalion was expanded.

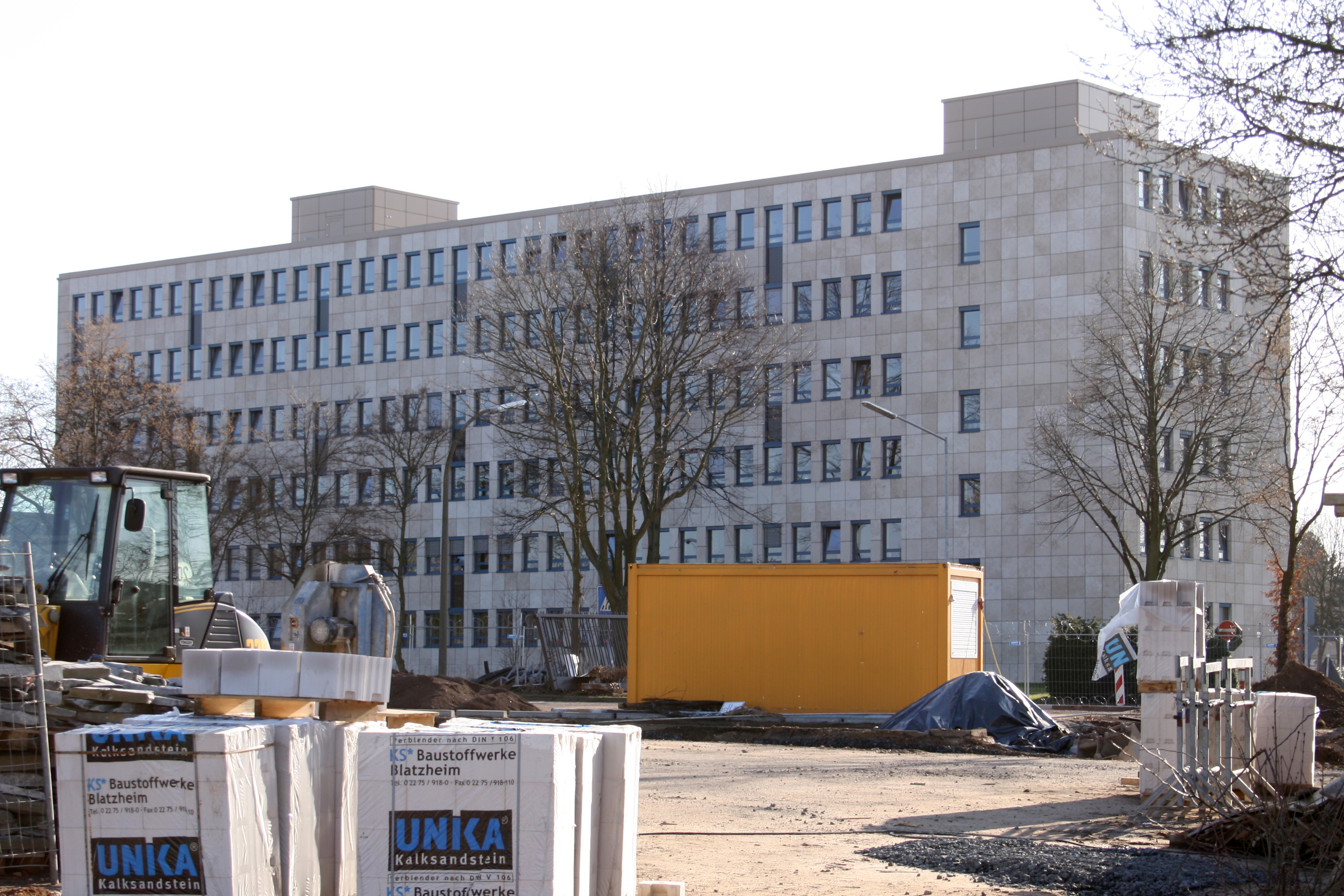
Ministry of Defense headquarters

The Hardthöhe property underwent extensive expansion from 1979 to 1987 following a building construction competition announced in 1973, when 50,000 square meters of office space was added to the existing buildings, including the Internal Services building (until 1983) and the so-called Central Office (until 1987). The planning group Groth and Lehmann-Walter, which won first place in the competition, was responsible for these buildings. In a further construction phase, based on a renewed architectural competition in 1986, the new ministerial building and a pyramid-shaped southern casino, designed by Bad Nauheim architect Johannes Peter Hölzinger, followed in 1997. In the 1990s, the renovation of the buildings from the 1950s and 1960s, some of which are listed, began. Buildings from the 1950s were restored to their original design.

In March 1997, construction began on a new direct road connection to the previously provisionally connected South Guard Station, which opened in April 1998. In 2000, the shooting rang on Hardthöhe was closed. From 2000 to 2002, the Bundeswehr's outdated medical center was expanded with a new building, and the existing building was also renovated by 2006.

The "1000-Man Barracks" was renovated again from 2004 to 2006 by the Federal Office for Building and Regional Planning. The redesign of the outdoor facilities is intended to honour the aesthetic and functional approach of the 1950s. The buildings as well as supply and disposal routes were modernized based on extensive inventories and analytical assessments with a view to improving the ecological quality of the facility. Paving was partially installed in the parking area. Surface water from the parking spaces and roof water has since been channelled into modelled infiltration basins.

The so-called North Watch (Nordwache) was renovated in 2006–08 and 2010–11. At the beginning of 2013, the Federal Office for Infrastructure, Environmental Protection and Services of the Bundeswehr moved from the Ermekeil Barracks to the Hardthöhe. From 2018 to 2020, a new government canteen was built to replace the dilapidated North Casino, which had long since been replaced by a temporary structure. From 2018 to 2021, the Bundeswehr-operated daycare center, located outside the military security area, also received a new building.
