= Civil–military co-operation =

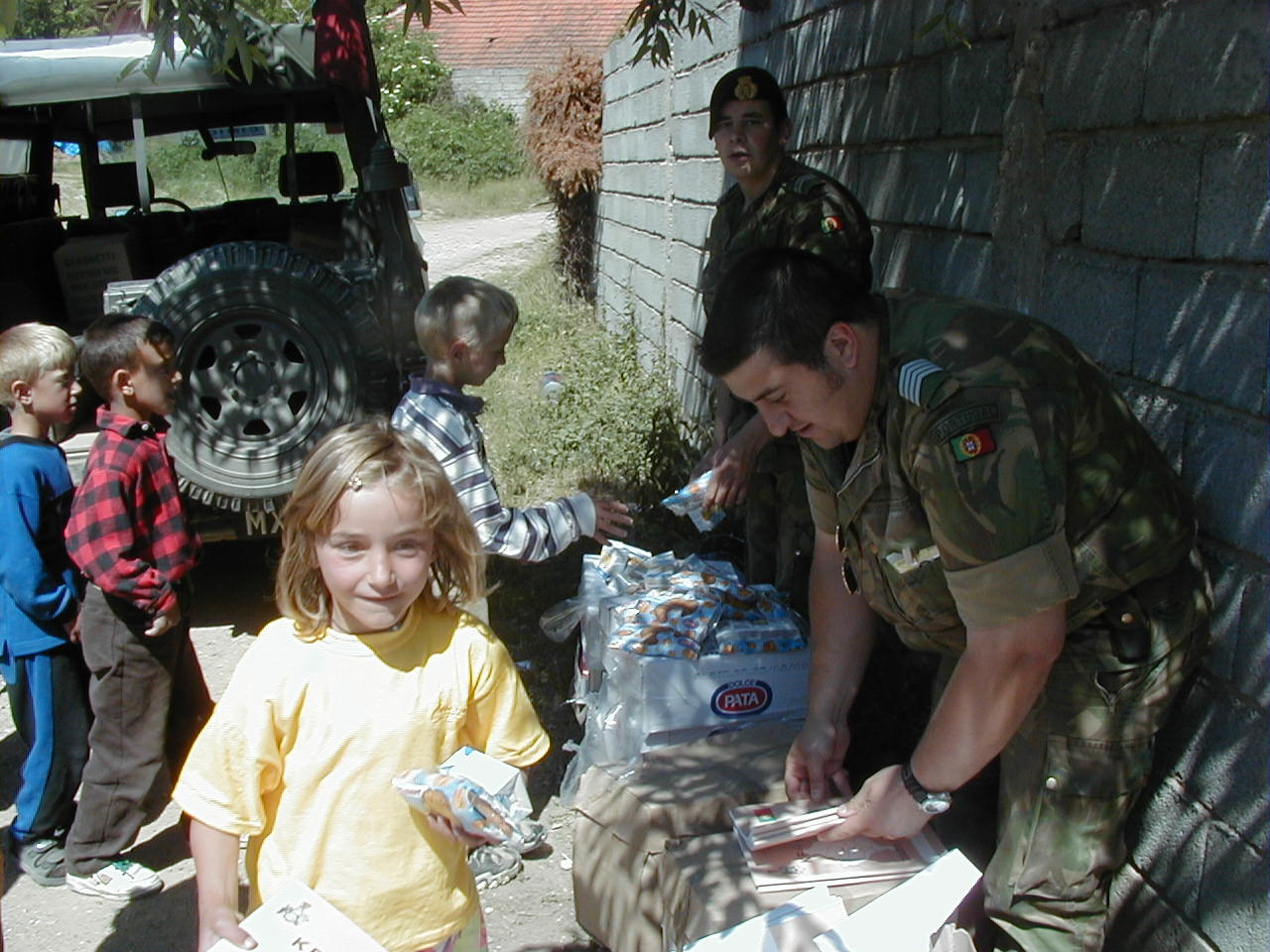
Portuguese Army soldiers in a CIMIC action in Pristina, Kosovo.

Civil–Military Cooperation (CIMIC) involves military commanders establishing connections with civilian agencies in operational theaters.

== History ==
The U.S. Army has maintained civil affairs units since WWII. Part of their function includes CIMIC tasks. However, they have a much broader function and a different focus from most other CIMIC organizations. In the mid-1990s most NATO members began developing their own CIMIC structures, which lead to the establishment of the Civil–Military Cooperation Centre of Excellence in The Hague in 2001. Germany maintains its own centre.

== See also ==
- Civil–military operations
- Peace Support Training Centre
