= Federal Academy for Security Policy =

German military academy

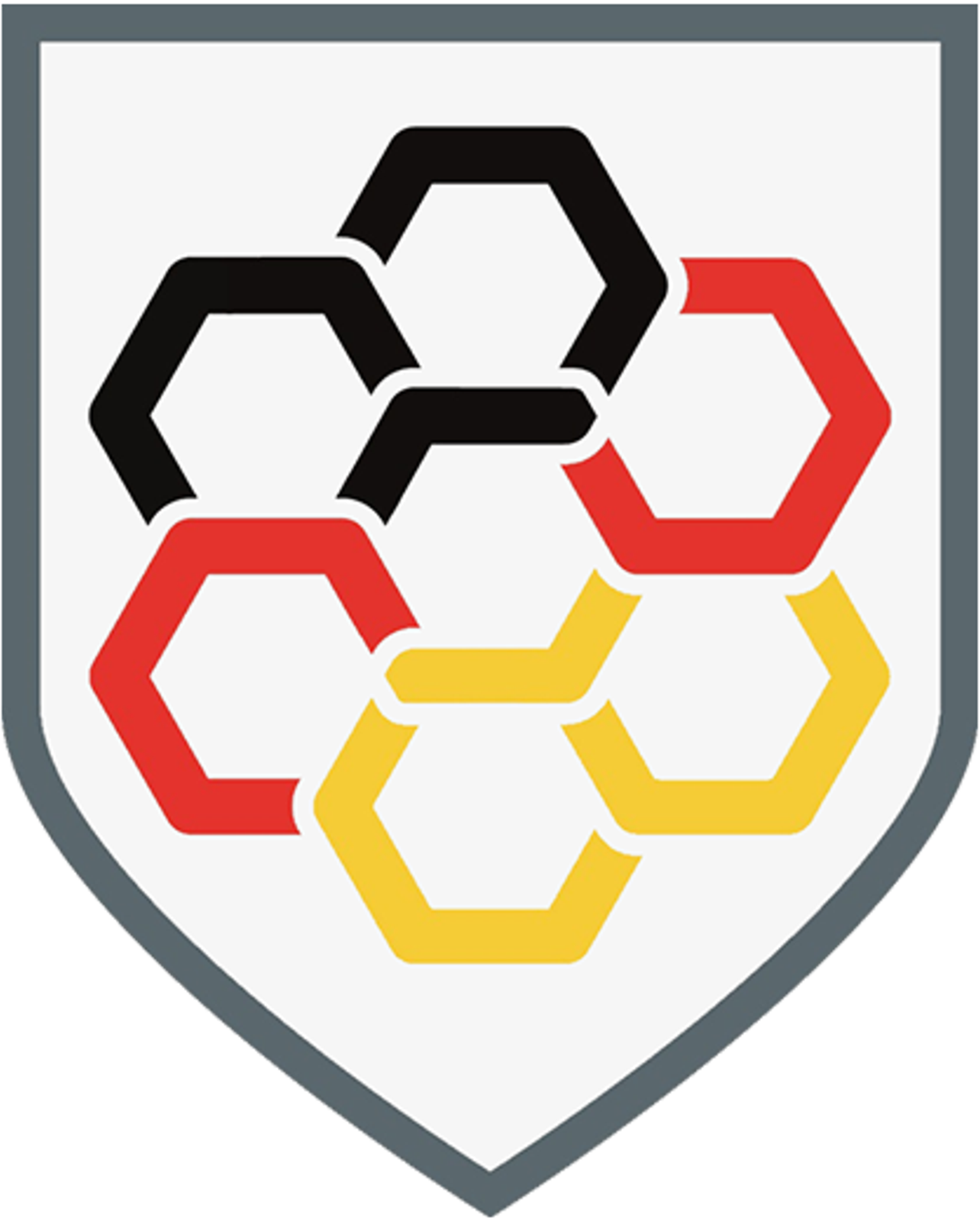
- Active: 1992
- Country: Germany
- Allegiance: Bundeswehr
- Branch: Joint Support Service
- Part of: Joint Support Service Command
- Garrison/HQ: Berlin-Niederschönhausen
- Website: http://www.baks.bund.de

Commanders
- President: Dr. Karl-Heinz Kamp
- Vice President: Wolfgang Rudischhauser

The Federal Academy for Security Policy (German: Bundesakademie für Sicherheitspolitik, BAKS) is the Federal Republic of Germany’s interministerial institution for advanced studies, education and training in security policy in the remit of the Federal Ministry of Defence. It has its seat in a complex of buildings on the premises of Schönhausen Palace in Berlin-Niederschönhausen, which was built in the 1950s for the former East German Government.

== Tasks and objectives ==
The Federal Academy for Security Policy is responsible for providing comprehensive advanced training beyond ministerial bounds for current and future executive personnel both from federal and state institutions and from private sectors of relevance to security policy. It covers all areas of security policy and government and personal action. It is also responsible for establishing a network between the above groups of people. The Federal Academy for Security Policy sees itself as a forum for discussing security policy interests and in this function it supports Germany’s role within the international community and international organisations of all kinds, with the objective of establishing a consensus in security policy issues.

The core event of the academy’s programme is its annual six-month Senior Course on Security Policy which is attended by about thirty people from federal and states ministries, the business sector and the scientific community. It is sometimes also attended by people from foreign ministries and supranational organisations.

== History ==
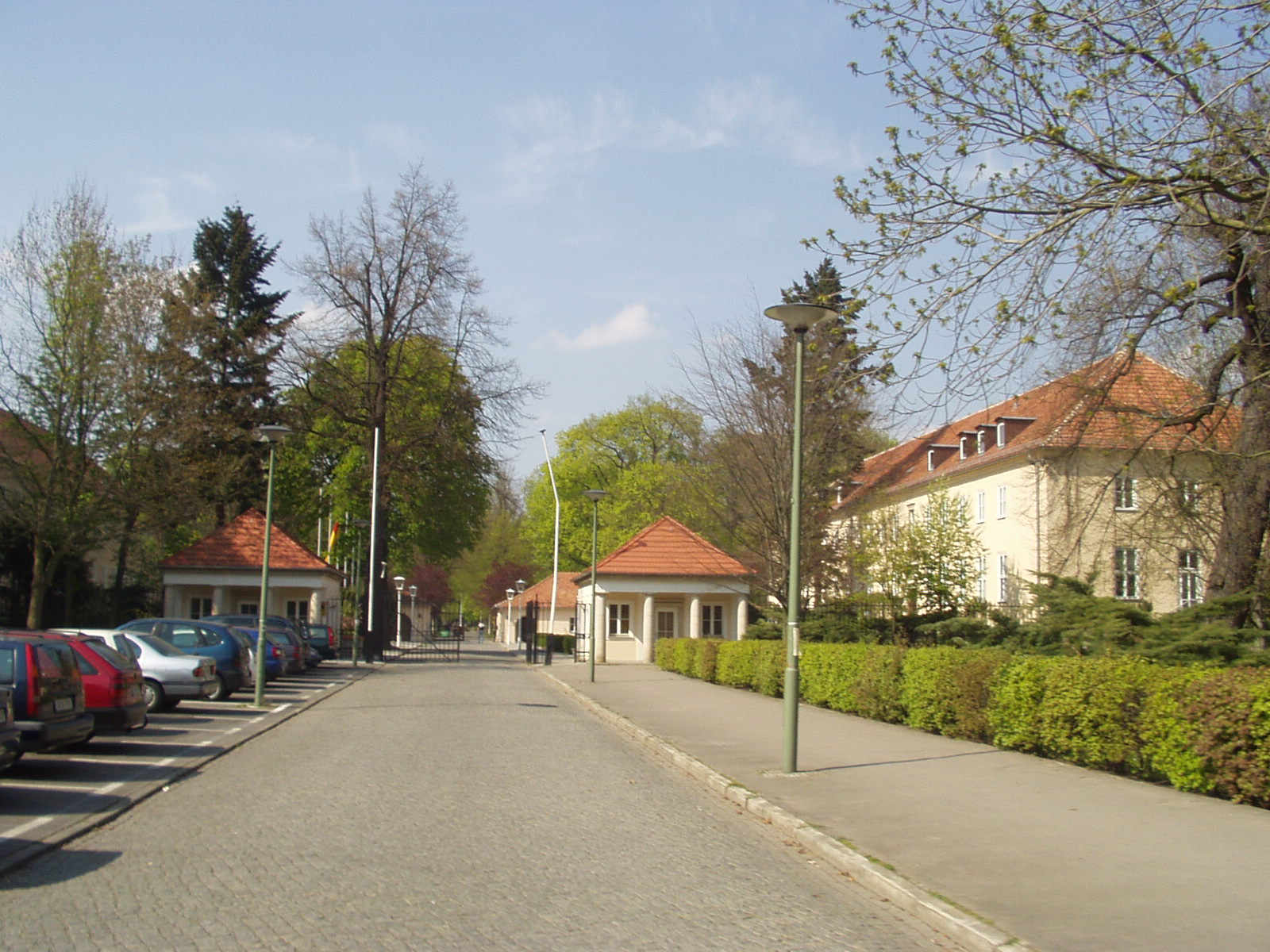
BAKS - main entrance

In the mid-1980s, debate arose about the establishment of a national training institution for discussing and disseminating information on security policy issues similar to institutes that already existed in other countries (such as the National Defense University in Washington, the Institut des Hautes Etudes de Défense Nationale in Paris or the Royal College of Defence Studies in London).

In the summer of 1987, the Federal Security Council for the first time discussed the possibility of establishing such an institution and formulated the following fundamental requirements:

- “Germany’s many and varied international commitments raise the need for professionally trained executive personnel who are capable of representing national interests effectively at international level.”
- “This requires security policy and a general strategy to extend beyond the bounds of the ministries and be based on a common understanding of national German interests.”
- “Acceptance of Germany’s security policy by the general public is a vital element of security itself. The intensified public debate on security issues requires competent executive personnel within the government, the business sector, the scientific community and the media who are able to take the necessary lead in the formation of opinion.”
- “The wish for increased cooperation on security issues with our European allies demands German officials and officers to undergo international standard preparatory training at national level.”

An interministerial committee then addressed the issue and recommended the establishment of an appropriate institution for meeting these fundamental requirements. In 1988, the Federal Security Council endorsed the recommendation of the committee and commissioned it to draw up a curriculum for the institution, which was approved by the committee in the summer of 1989.

In February 1990, the Federal Security Council approved the curriculum, deciding to establish an institution within the remit of the Federal Ministry of Defence. In the summer of that year, the Federal Cabinet agreed on the establishment of the Federal Academy for Security Policy and the Federal Security Council was to form the Board of Trustees of the academy.

The academy began its work in 1992, its first president being Admiral (ret.) Dieter Wellershoff, at its temporary home, the “Rosenburg” in Bonn. At the same time, an advisory board was established to assist the academy in its work, primarily by issuing recommendations regarding its curriculum.

On the recommendation of the Advisory Board and the academy, the board of trustees in 2002 decided to permanently relocate the institution to Berlin. Following extensive building and restoration work, the college moved into its new building on the premises of Schönhausen Palace in Berlin Pankow in March 2004.

Since March 2004, the Federal Academy for Security Policy has been located in its own complex, featuring auditoriums, conference rooms and offices, nestled in the park of the premises of Schönhausen Palace in Berlin Pankow.

== Organisation and Staff ==
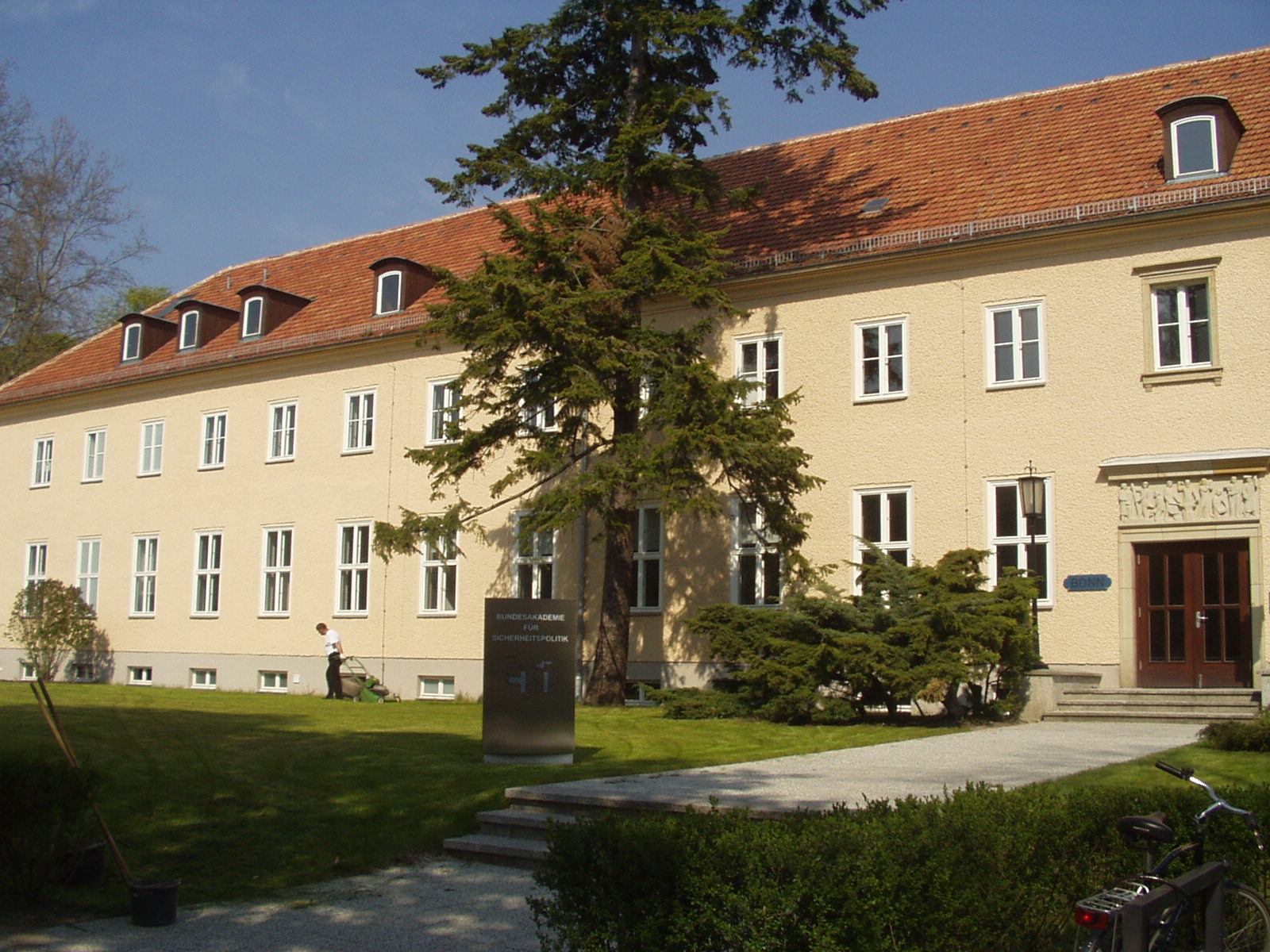
House "Bonn" as viewed from the front

The Federal Foreign Office and the Federal Ministry of Defence take turns in nominating the president and vice president of the Federal Academy for Security Policy. In addition to the presidency, the Federal Academy for Security Policy consists of an Academic Department and a Supporting Department. The academic staff comes from the ministries represented in the Federal Security Council (the Federal Foreign Office, the Federal Ministry of the Interior, the Federal Ministry of Justice, the Federal Ministry of Finance, the Federal Ministry of Economics and Technology, the Federal Ministry of Defence and the Federal Ministry for Economic Cooperation and Development). The support staff comes from the Federal Ministry of Defence.

The Federal Academy’s Board of Trustees is made up of the members of the Federal Security Council and chaired by the Federal Chancellor and decides on general issues concerning teaching practices and activities at the college. An Advisory Board issues recommendations to the Board of Trustees regarding the college’s curriculum.

Presidents

Nr.	Name	Beginning of term	End of term	Title/Rank
6	Hans-Dieter Heumann	August 2011	--	Ambassador
5	Kersten Lahl	April 2008	August 2011	Lieutenant General (ret.)
4	Dr. Rudolf Adam	April 2004	March 2008	
3	Hans Frank	1999	March 2004	Vice Admiral (ret.)
2	Dr. Günter Joetze	1995	1999	Ambassador
1	Dieter Wellershoff	1992	1995	Admiral (ret.)

== Publications ==
The Federal Academy for Security Policy releases publications on security issues and awards the Karl Carstens Prize, which was named after the former Federal President Carstens. The prize is awarded to people who have rendered outstanding services in promoting security policy matters within the German-speaking area as well as conveying security policy issues to the public on a broad scale". The prize is awarded on a rotational basis with the Manfred Wörner speech. Its aim is to uphold the tradition of Memorial Speeches and honour the former Federal Minister of Defence and NATO Secretary General Manfred Wörner as well as to promote the discourse on security policy. A second supplementary issue of the compendium “New dimensions in security policy” was published by the Mittler Verlag in June 2009. In addition, the attendees of the Senior Course on Security Policy each year develop a thesis on specific security policy issues for the Federal Chancellery. In 2010, the title of this so-called General Seminar Task was “European Security and Russia – Options from the German Perspective”.
