= Manfred Nielson =

German Admiral and Deputy Supreme Allied Commander Transformation

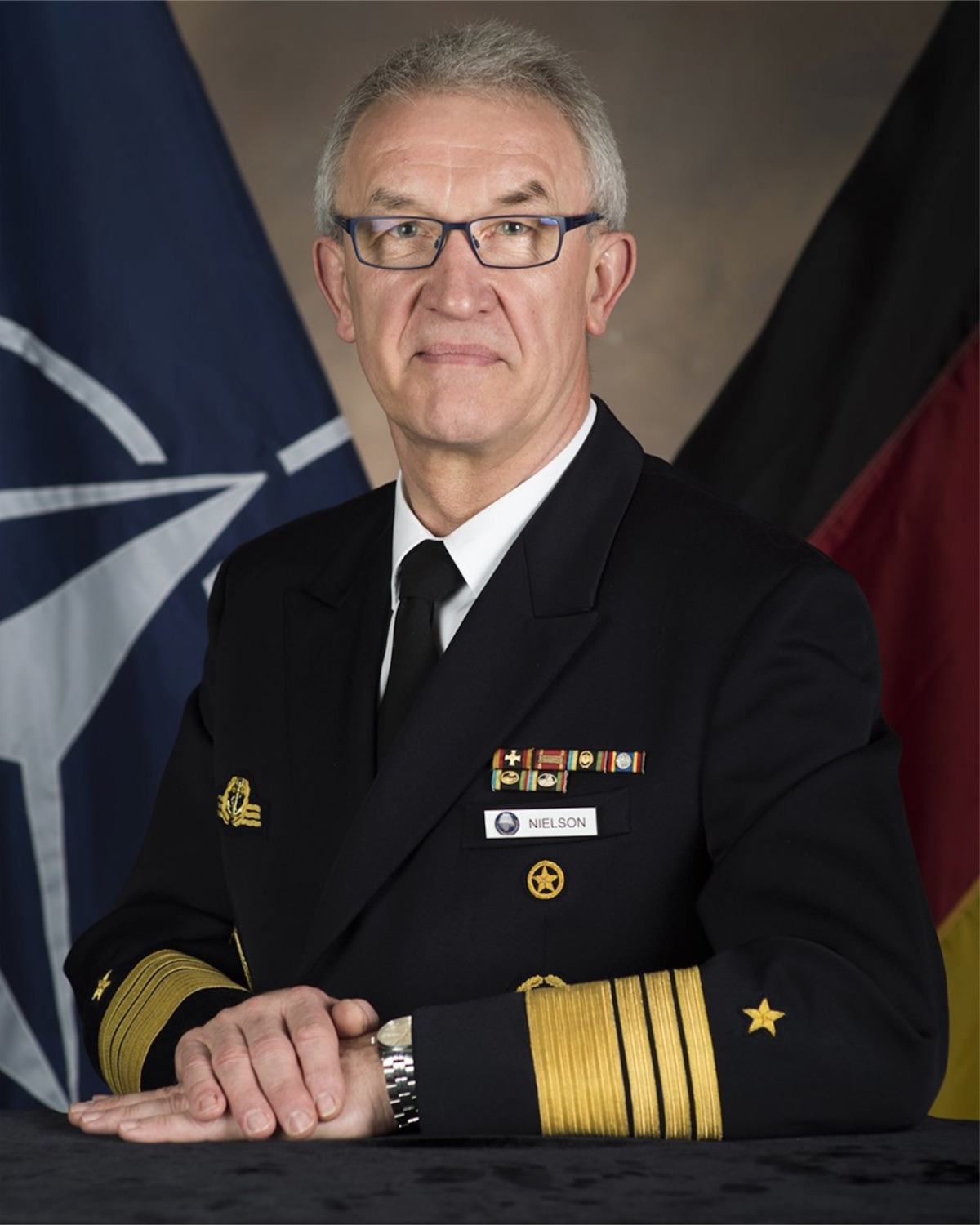
- Born: February 25, 1955 (age 71); Dorsten, West Germany
- Allegiance: Germany
- Branch: German Navy
- Service years: 1973–2019
- Rank: Admiral
- Commands: Armed Forces Staff; Joint Support Service Command

Manfred Nielson (born February 25, 1955) is a retired admiral of the German Navy who last served as Deputy Supreme Allied Commander Transformation in Norfolk, Virginia.

== Career ==
=== Education and first assignments ===
After finishing his A-levels in 1973, Nielson entered the West German navy as reserve officer candidate. From 1974 to 1975 he served as Watch officer on the coastal minesweeper Koblenz and Wetzlar with the 6th minesweeping squadron in Wilhelmshaven. Beginning in 1975 he studied economics at the Helmut Schmidt University of the Bundeswehr in Hamburg and graduated in 1978 with a master's degree. After graduating he returned to the German Fleet and served as watch officer on board of the minehunter Flensburg, Cuxhaven and Koblenz. From 1980 to 1981 he completed a special training course related to the application of submerged weapons at the Navy weapon school in Eckernförde. He subsequently took over command of the minehunters Tübingen in 1983 and Paderborn in 1985. In 1985, Nielson released his command and was redeployed to the West German defense staff in Bonn where he served as junior adviser.

=== Staff officer assignments ===
From 1986 to 1988 he successfully joined the 28th Command and General staff course at the Führungsakademie der Bundeswehr of the Bundeswehr in Hamburg and was promoted to the rank of corvette captain. In 1988 Nielson became the operations officer and deputy commander of the 6th minesweeping squadron in Wilhelmshaven. In 1990 he returned to the Federal German Ministry of Defense in Bonn where he served as adviser in the Directorate-General for Personnel. From 1994 to 1997 he was the special assistant to the Director-General for Personnel of the Ministry of Defense. In 1997 he took over command of the 6th minesweeping squadron in Wilhelmshaven. A further redeployment in 1998 brought Nielson back to the German Ministry of Defense where he became Branch Chief Central Affairs within the Directorate-General for Plans and Policy by simultaneously being promoted to the rank of captain. In 2000 he changed his post within the same Directorate and served as Branch Chief Personnel. From 2002 to 2002 Nielson was Director of the personal office of the Deputy Secretary of Defense Klaus-Günther Biederbick.

=== Flag assignments ===
In 2003, Nielson was promoted to the rank of rear admiral (lower half). He took command of the German Naval Academy in Flensburg and was in charge of the education of all prospective German naval officers. From May till October 2003 he was deployed to the Horn of Africa where he served as Commander Combined Task Force 150 with the Operation Enduring Freedom. In 2005 he was once again redeployed to the Ministry of Defence where he acted as Division Chief of the Directorate-General for Personnel.

In 2008, Nielson was promoted to rear admiral (upper half). He served as Chief of Staff of the German Defense Staff within the Ministry of Defense under the command of the German Chiefs of Defense Wolfgang Schneiderhan and Volker Wieker. On July 1, 2010, he was promoted to vice admiral and became Commander of the German Fleet Command in Glücksburg. During that tour of duty vice admiral Nielson was selected by the Secretary of Defense Thomas de Maizière to become Director of a special staff that was created to prepare the intended restructuring process of the Bundeswehr. In June 2011 he was selected as Special Director for the audit of all running and planned procurement projects of the Bundeswehr under the scope of the restructuring process. This job was followed by the order to prepare the establishment of a new Directorate-General for Planning within the Ministry of Defense in Berlin. In April 2012 he took command of the Joint Support Service Command of the German Forces in Bonn leading over 43,000 personnel. Nielson took over his new assignment within NATO as Deputy Supreme Allied Commander Transformation in Norfolk, Virginia on March 24, 2016. He is the fifth German naval officer since 1955 to hold the rank of a full admiral.

== Awards and decorations ==
- Badge of Honour of the Bundeswehr (Ehrenkreuz der Bundeswehr in Gold)
- German Armed Forces Deployment Medal (Einsatzmedaille Operation Enduring Freedom)
- German Flood Service Medal (2013) (Einsatzmedaille Fluthilfe 2013)

== Private life ==
Nielson is married with two children, now adults.
