= Armed Forces Office (Germany) =

Coordinates: 50.6987°N 7.0444°E

Armed Forces Office — XX —
- Active: 1959–
- Country: Germany
- Branch: Joint Support and Enabling Service
- Type: High command
- Part of: Kommando Streitkräftebasis
- Location: Bonn
- Website: www.kommando.streitkraeftebasis.de

Commanders
- Current commander: Brigadegeneral Franz Weidhüner

The Armed Forces Office or Joint Support Office (German: Streitkräfteamt, SKA) is an agency of the German armed forces, the Bundeswehr, responsible for administering various joint components of the Bundeswehr. It is based in Bonn, and since the restructuring of the Bundeswehr in 2013 has been directly subordinate to the Streitkräftebasis (Joint Support and Enabling Service). Its commander is a Generalmajor or Konteradmiral.
