= Joint Support Service (Germany) =

Logistics branch of the Bundeswehr

Joint Support and Enabling Service
- Streitkräftebasis
- Logo of the Joint Support and Enabling Service
- Active: 1 October 2000
- Disbanded: 31 March 2025
- Country: Germany
- Allegiance: Bundeswehr
- Branch: Multi-service
- Type: Joint
- Role: Military logistics
- Size: 28,000 (2023)
- Part of: Kommando Streitkräftebasis
- Garrison/HQ: Hardthöhe
- March: Marsch der Streikräftebasis
- Website: www.streitkraeftebasis.de

Commanders
- Inspector: Generalleutnant Martin Schelleis (German Air Force)
- Deputy Inspector: Generalleutnant Peter Bohrer (German Air Force)
- Chief of Staff: Generalmajor Jürgen Setzer (German Army)
- Notable commanders: Manfred Nielson, Wolfram Kühn

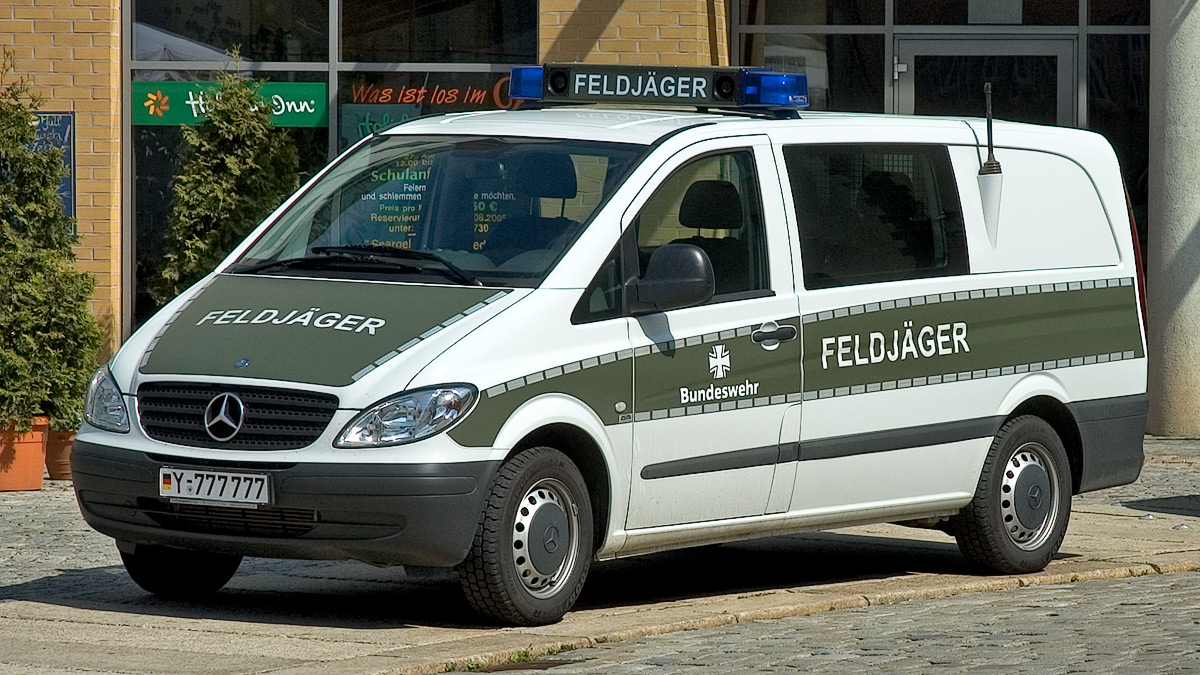
A Feldjäger MP patrol vehicle

The Joint Support and Enabling Service (German: Streitkräftebasis, pronounced [ˈʃtʁaɪ̯tˌkʁɛftəˌbaːzɪs], abbreviated: SKB, pronounced [ɛskaːˈbeː]; literally Armed Forces Foundation) was a branch of the German Bundeswehr established in October 2000 as a result of major reforms of the Bundeswehr. It handled various logistic and organisational tasks of the Bundeswehr. The SKB was one of six components of the Bundeswehr, the other five being the Army, Navy, Air Force, the Joint Medical Service, and the Cyber and Information Domain Service. As of April 2020, the force is composed of 27,840 personnel. In May 2021 the minister of defense Annegret Kramp-Karrenbauer together with inspector general Eberhard Zorn published a plan to dissolve the Joint Support and Enabling Service and to reintegrate its units into the army, navy, airforce and cyber command. It was dissolved and replaced by the Bundeswehr Joint Support Command in March 2025.

== Structure ==
Unlike the similar British Defence Logistics Organisation and the Australian Department of Defence's Support Command Australia, a number of combat-associated commands were allotted to the SKB, principally the small German territorial defence structure embodied in the four Wehrbereichskommandos (Military District Commands), and the national supervision of active German military operations beyond the NATO area, performed by the Armed Forces Operations Command (the Einsatzführungskommando der Bundeswehr), which is headquartered in Potsdam.

The WBK headquarters were in Kiel (WBK I); Mainz (WBK II); Erfurt (WBK III); and Munich (WBK IV). Each Military District Command controlled several Landeskommandos (State Commands) due to the federal structure of Germany. Previously this function was carried out by the Verteidigungsbezirkskommandos (VBKs) or Military Region Commands (Defence District Commands). These commands were in charge of all military facilities in their area of responsibility and of several supporting regiments. The SKB headquarters was formed on the basis of the former IV (German) Corps headquarters. Most of its remaining elements have been reassigned from the Central Military Agencies of the Bundeswehr, encompassing a wide range of logistics agencies, schools, and other support units.

The top command authorities are the Kommando Streitkräftebasis (Joint Support and Enabling Service Command) which is in charge of numerous of command and control roles. The Streitkräfteamt (Armed Forces Office) directs all schools, training and research centres, the Militärischer Abschirmdienst (Military Counterintelligence Service), and the Bundeswehr's higher academies and universities.

In April 2012 as part of the major reorganisation that ended conscription, the Armed Forces Operations Command (Einsatzführungskommando) was resubordinated directly to the Inspector of the Bundeswehr.

In September 2022 another reorganisation created the Territorial Operations Command (Territoriales Führungskommando) from parts of the JJoint Support and Enabling Service, which also was subordinated directly to the Inspector of the Bundeswehr.

- Joint Support and Enabling Service Headquarters, in Bonn
  - Military Studies Office, in Munich
  - Federal Security Policy Academy, in Berlin
  - German Military Representative at NATO & EU, in Brussels

=== Logistic Command ===
- Bundeswehr Logistic Command, in Erfurt
  - 1st Logistic Regiment, in Burg bei Magdeburg
    - 161st Logistic Battalion, in Delmenhorst
    - 163rd Logistic Battalion, in Delmenhorst
    - 171st Logistic Battalion, in Burg bei Magdeburg
    - 172nd Logistic Battalion, in Beelitz
  - 4th Logistic Regiment, in Volkach (activated 12 October 2023)
    - 461st Logistic Battalion, in Walldürn
    - 467th Logistic Battalion, in Volkach
    - 471st Logistic Battalion, in Osterheide (will go active 1 October 2024)
    - 472nd Logistic Battalion, in Kümmersbruck
  - 164th Special Pioneer Regiment, in Husum
  - Bundeswehr Logistic School, in Osterholz-Scharmbeck
  - Bundeswehr Logistic Center, in Wilhelmshaven
  - Bundeswehr Motor Vehicles Center, in Mönchengladbach

=== Military Police Command ===
- Bundeswehr Military Police Command, in Hanover
  - Military Police and Staff Service School, in Hanover
  - 1st Military Police Regiment, in Berlin
  - 2nd Military Police Regiment, in Hilden
  - 3rd Military Police Regiment, in Munich

=== CBRN-defense Command ===
- Bundeswehr CBRN-defense Command, in Bruchsal
  - CBRN-defense and Legal Protection Tasks School, in Sonthofen
  - 1st CBRN-defense Regiment, in Strausberg
  - 7th CBRN-defense Battalion, in Höxter
  - 750th CBRN-defense Battalion "Baden", in Bruchsal

=== Armed Forces Office ===
- Armed Forces Office, in Bonn
  - Bundeswehr Verification Tasks Centre, in Geilenkirchen
  - Bundeswehr Service Dog School, in Ulmen
  - Bundeswehr Public Relations Centre, in Strausberg
  - Bundeswehr Military Music Centre, in Bonn
  - Bundeswehr Sport School, in Warendorf
