= Kümmersbruck =

- Municipality
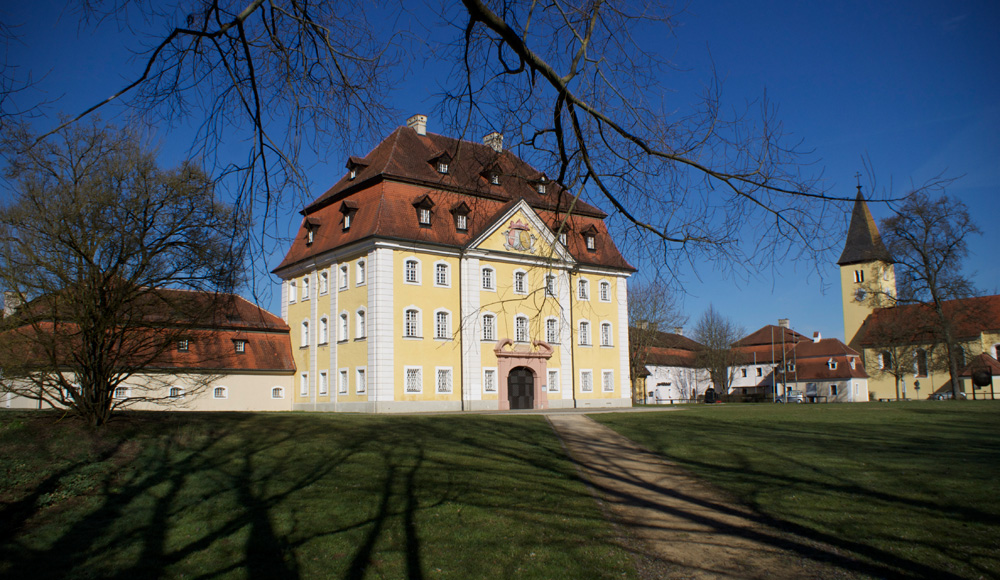
- Theuern Castle

- Coat of arms

- Location of Kümmersbruck within Amberg-Sulzbach district
- Interactive map of Kümmersbruck
- Location within Germany Location within Bavaria
- Coordinates: 49°25′N 11°53′E
- Country: Germany
- State: Bavaria
- Admin. region: Oberpfalz
- District: Amberg-Sulzbach

Government
  - Mayor (2020–26): Roland Strehl (CSU)

Area
  - Total: 47.3 km^{2} (18.3 sq mi)
- Elevation: 370–490 m (1,210–1,610 ft)

Population (2025-12-31)
  - Total: 9,833
  - Density: 208/km^{2} (538/sq mi)
- Time zone: UTC+01:00 (CET)
  - Summer (DST): UTC+02:00 (CEST)
- Postal codes: 92245
- Dialling codes: 09621, 09624 (Theuern)
- Vehicle registration: AS
- Website: www.kuemmersbruck.de

Kümmersbruck (German pronunciation: [ˈkʏmɐsbʁʊk]) is a municipality in the Amberg-Sulzbach district, in the state of Bavaria, Germany. It is situated 3 km southeast of Amberg. A division of the German Military is stationed here. Kümmersbruck is split up in 7 districts: Kümmersbruck, Haselmühl, Gärmersdorf, Moos, Haidweiher, Penkhof, Lengenfeld and Engelsdorf. The river Vils crosses the municipality.

== Geography ==
Apart from Kümmersbruck the municipality consists of the following villages:

- Engelsdorf
- Gärmersdorf
- Haidweiher
- Haselmühl
- Köfering
- Lengenfeld
- Moos
- Penkhof
- Theuern

== Town twinnings ==
Kümmersbruck is twinned with:

- Campbeltown, Argyll, Scotland
- Holýšov, Czech Republic

== Notable people ==
- Andreas Schillinger (born 13 July 1983 in Kümmersbruck) is a German former cyclist
