= Hardthöhe =

District in Bonn, Germany

- Ortsteil of Bonn
- Interactive map of Hardthöhe
- Location within Germany Location within North Rhine-Westphalia
- Coordinates: 50°41′57″N 7°02′25″E
- Country: Germany
- State: North Rhine-Westphalia
- District: Urban district
- Town: Bonn
- Time zone: UTC+01:00 (CET)
  - Summer (DST): UTC+02:00 (CEST)

Hardthöhe is a district at the western edge of Bonn, Germany. The districts contains mostly the headquarters of the Federal Ministry of Defense (BMVg) since 1960 and Hardthöhe is the synonym for the German Political command structures. The second BMVg-office is the Bendlerblock in Berlin and Bundeswehr Operational Command is located close to Potsdam.

Hardthöhe area was not part of Bonn before 1969 and belonged to the Amt Duisdorf. In 1969, Hardthöhe, together with Duisdorf and Lengsdorf, were assigned to the municipal district of Hardtberg, Bonn.

The rearmament of West Germany was organized by Konrad Adenauer from the “Amt Blank”, named after his boss Theodor Blank. The staff was initially housed in the Ermekeil barracks in the south of Bonn. From 1956 onwards, a modern barracks for around 1,000 people was built for the new ministry on a hill in the Hardtberg district.

At the beginning of 2013 the Bundeswehr Federal Office for Infrastructure, Environmental Protection and Services moved from the Ermekeilil barracks to the Hardthöhe.
