= Hardtberg =

City district of Bonn, Germany

- Borough of Bonn
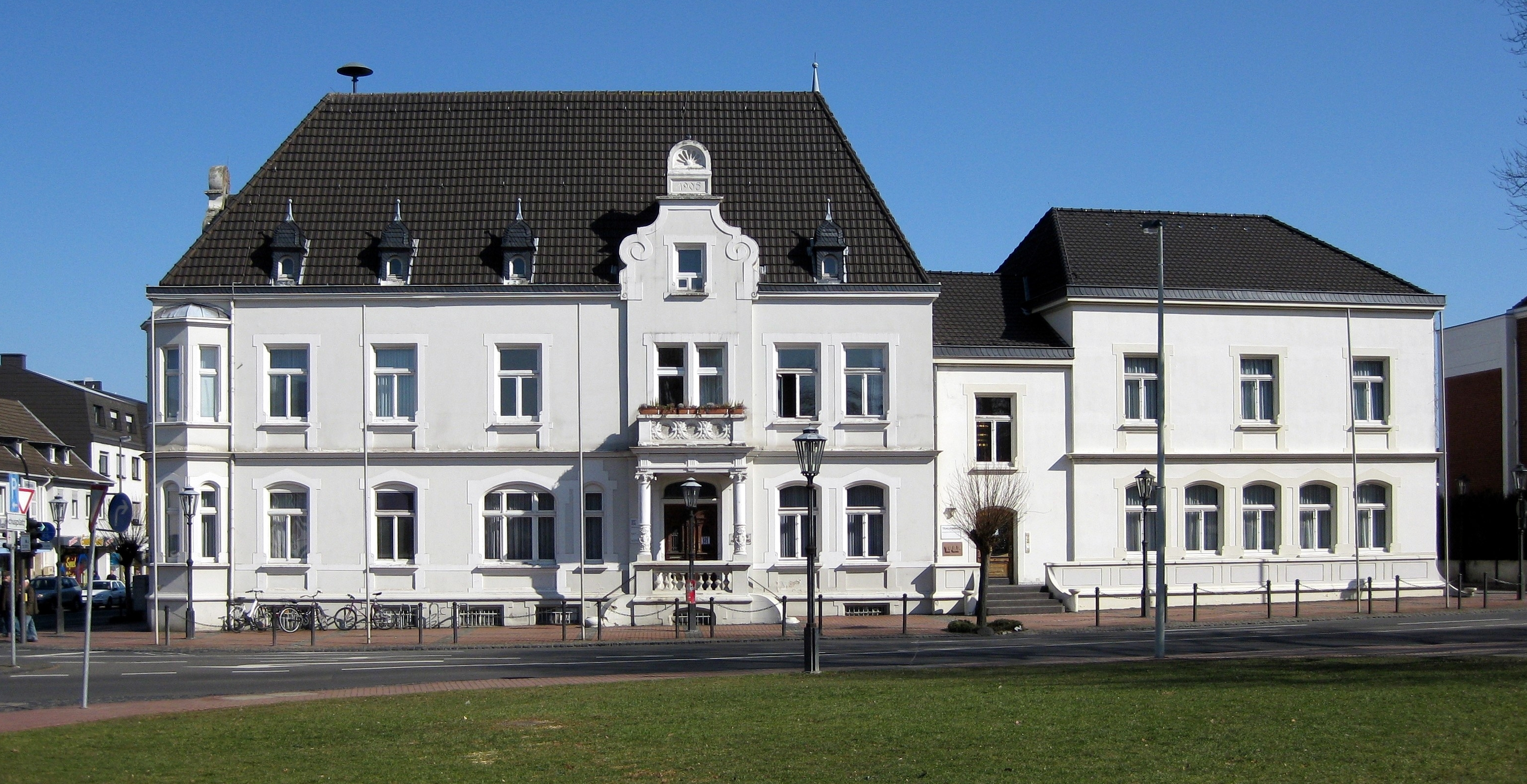
- Hardtberg Town Hall

- Flag Coat of arms

- Hardtberg within Bonn
- Interactive map of Hardtberg
- Location within Germany Location within North Rhine-Westphalia
- Coordinates: 50°42′49″N 7°03′14″E
- Country: Germany
- State: North Rhine-Westphalia
- Admin. region: Cologne
- District: Urban district
- City: Bonn

Area
  - Total: 11.9 km^{2} (4.6 sq mi)
- Elevation: 71–162 m (233–531 ft)

Population (2020-12-31)
  - Total: 34,576
  - Density: 2,910/km^{2} (7,530/sq mi)
- Time zone: UTC+01:00 (CET)
  - Summer (DST): UTC+02:00 (CEST)
- Dialling codes: 0228
- Vehicle registration: BN

Hardtberg (Ripuarian: Hardtbersch) is a borough (Stadtbezirk) of Bonn, Germany. It has a population of 34,576 (2018).

== Twin towns – sister cities ==
Hardtberg is twinned with:

- Villemomble, France (1967)
