= Federal Ministry of Defence (Germany) =

Federal ministry of the Federal Republic of Germany

- Bundesministerium der Verteidigung

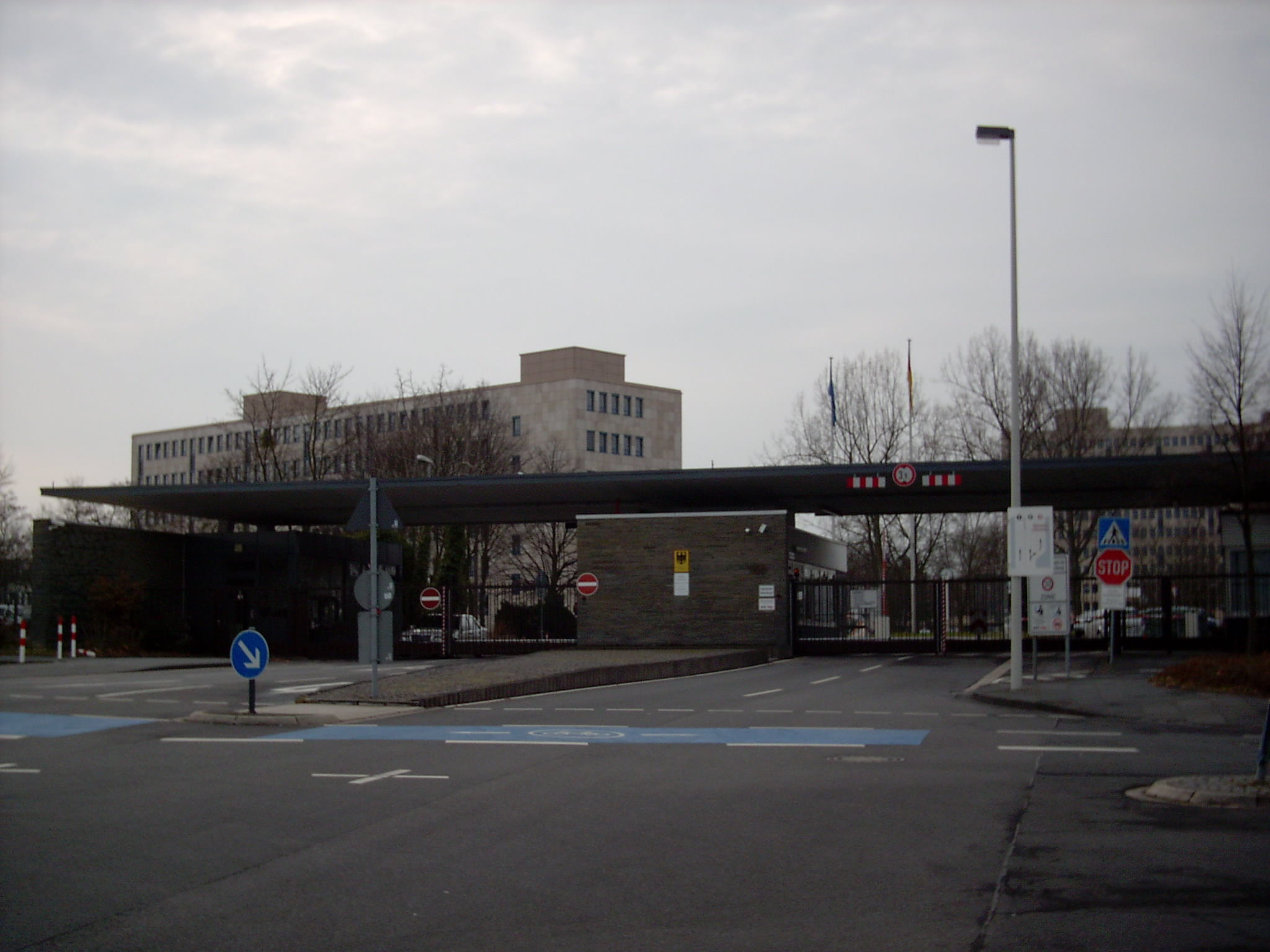
- Entrance to the Hardthöhe, Bonn

Agency overview
- Formed: 1919^{1}/1955^{2}
- Jurisdiction: Cabinet of Germany
- Headquarters: Hardthöhe, Bonn, Germany; 50°41′57″N 7°2′25″E
- Annual budget: €53 billion (2021)
- Minister responsible: Boris Pistorius, Federal Minister of Defence
- Agency executives: Nils Schmid, Parliamentary Secretary of State; Sebastian Hartmann, Parliamentary Secretary of State
- Website: www.bmvg.de

Footnotes
- 1: As the Ministry of the Reichswehr, succeeding the Ministry of War of Prussia, the Ministry of War of Saxony, the Ministry of War of Bavaria, the Ministry of War of Württemberg and the Imperial Naval Office; 2: As the Ministry of Defence (Bundesministerium für Verteidigung) in West Germany

The Federal Ministry of Defence (German: Bundesministerium der Verteidigung, pronounced [ˈbʊndəsminɪsˌteːʁiʊm deːɐ̯ fɐˈtaɪdɪɡʊŋ]; abbreviated BMVg) is a top-level federal agency, headed by the Federal Minister of Defence as a member of the Cabinet of Germany. The ministry is headquartered at the Hardthöhe barracks itself located at the Hardthöhe district in Bonn and has a second office in the Bendlerblock building in Berlin, which is occasionally used as a metonym to denote the entire Ministry.

According to Article 65a of the German Constitution (Grundgesetz), the Federal Minister of Defence is Commander-in-chief of the Bundeswehr, the German armed forces, with around 260,953 active soldiers and civilians. Article 115b decrees that in the state of defence, declared by the Bundestag with consent of the Bundesrat, the command in chief passes to the Chancellor. The ministry currently has approximately 2,000 employees.

== Organization ==
On April 1, 2012, the Federal Ministry of Defence (DEU MOD) changes its organization to the following general structure:

=== Senior Management Level ===
- Federal Minister of Defence (acts as High Commander of the German armed forces in peacetime)
  - 2 Parliamentary Secretaries of State
  - 2 Secretaries of State
- subordinated to the Senior Management
  - Support Office
  - Press & Information Office
  - Politics Directorate

=== Directorates ===
- Secretary of State #1
  - Equipment Directorate (lost the Cyber & IT branch in 2016)
  - Cyber & IT Directorate (founded 2016)
- Secretary of State #2
  - Financial & Controlling Directorate
  - Personnel Directorate
  - Infrastructure, Antipollution & Administrative Services Directorate
  - Legal Directorate
- Inspector General of the Bundeswehr
  - Plans & Policies Directorate
  - Strategy & Operations Directorate
  - Armed Forces Command & Control Directorate

=== Departments of the Federal armed forces ===
The Bundeswehr is divided into a military part (armed forces or Streitkräfte) and a civil part with the armed forces administration (Wehrverwaltung) and consists of 11 Departments/Services:

- Armed Forces
  - German Army (Heer)
  - German Navy (Marine)
  - German Air Force (Luftwaffe)
  - Bundeswehr Joint Medical Service (Zentraler Sanitätsdienst)
  - Joint Support Service (Streitkräftebasis) including the Center for Military History and Social Sciences of the Bundeswehr
  - Cyber- and Information Domain Service (Cyber- und Informationsraum)(founded in 2017 from parts of the Joint Support Service)
- Armed Forces Administration
  - Personnel Management (Personal)
  - Information Technology & In-Service Management (Ausrüstung, Informationstechnologie und Nutzung)
  - Infrastructure, Antipollution & Administrative Services (Infrastruktur, Umweltschutz und Dienstleistungen)
  - Judicature (Recht)
  - Military Chaplaincy (Militärseelsorge)

=== Directly subordinated Offices & Agencies ===
- Armed Forces Operational Command (Einsatzführungskommando der Bundeswehr)
- Office for Military Aviation (Luftfahrtamt der Bundeswehr)
- Office for Plans & Policies (Planungsamt der Bundeswehr)
- Command & Control Academy (Führungsakademie der Bundeswehr)
- Center of Leadership Culture (Zentrum Innere Führung)
- Military Counter-intelligence Service (Bundesamt für den Militärischen Abschirmdienst)

== History ==
=== 19th century ===
From the Unification of Germany in 1871 until the end of World War I, the German Empire did not have a national Ministry of War. Rather, the larger German states (such as the kingdoms of Prussia, Bavaria, Saxony and Württemberg), insisting on their autonomy, each had their own war ministry. According to the military agreements the Prussian minister-president Otto von Bismarck had forged with the South German states on the eve of the Franco-Prussian War, the major states were also responsible for the defence of the smaller states. However, the Imperial Navy from 1889 was overseen by a federal department, the Imperial Naval Office.

=== Weimar and Nazi Germany ===
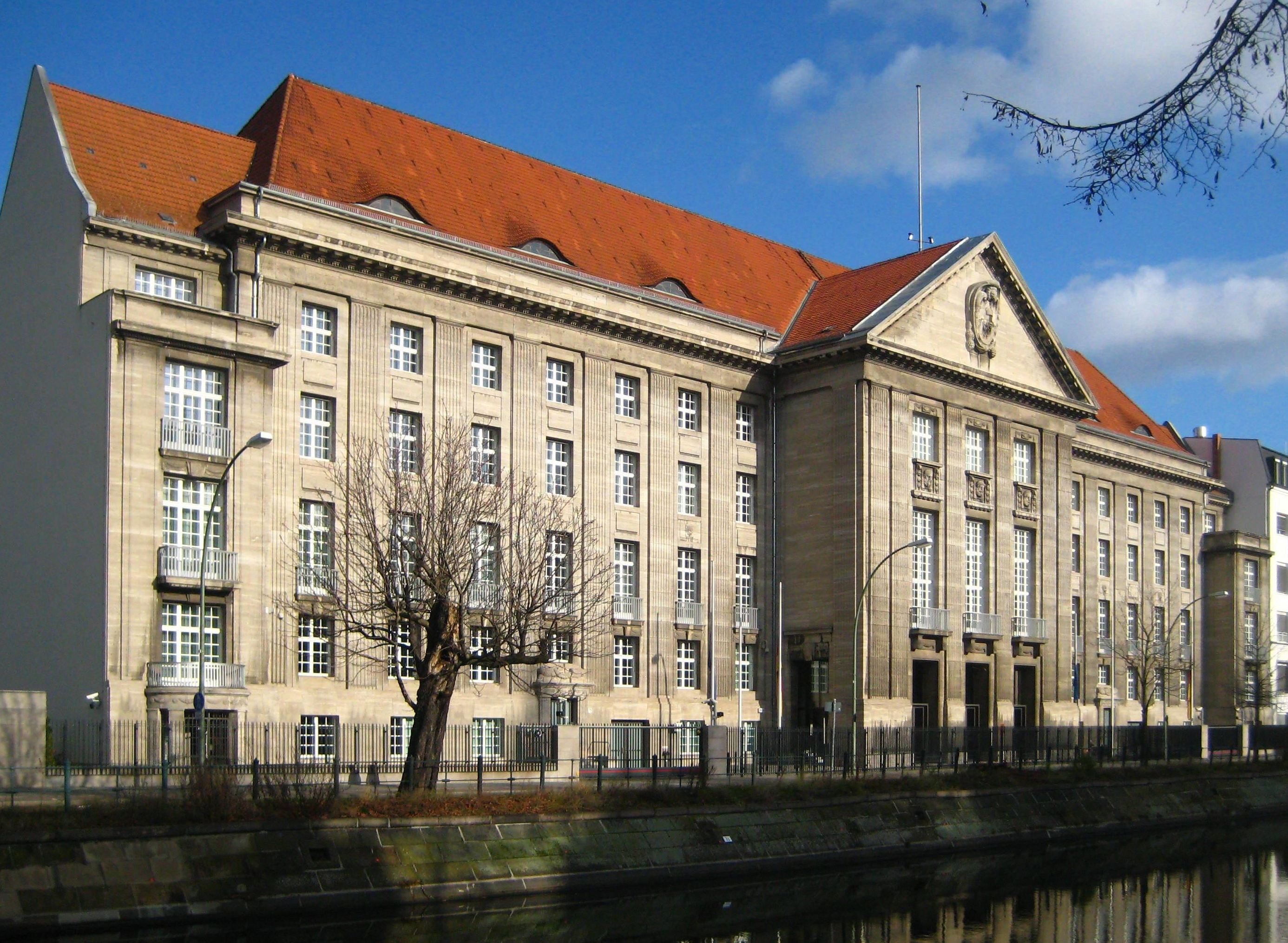
Bendlerblock, Berlin-Tiergarten, secondary seat since 1993

After the war and the German Revolution of 1918–19, the Weimar Constitution provided for a unified, national ministry of defence, which was created largely from the Prussian Ministry of War and the Imperial Naval Office. The Ministry of the Reichswehr was established in October 1919, and had its seat in the Bendlerblock building.

In the context of the Treaty of Versailles and the "Law for the Creation of a provisional Reichswehr" of March 1919, the Reichspräsident became the Commander-in-Chief of the armed forces, whilst the Reich Minister of Defence exercised military authority. Only in the Free State of Prussia did military authority remain with the State Minister of War. After the Weimar Constitution came into force, the remaining war ministries in the states of Bavaria, Saxony, Württemberg and Prussia were abolished and military authority was concentrated in the Reich Minister of Defence. Command was exercised respectively by the Chief of the Heeresleitung (Army Command) and the Chief of the Marineleitung (Navy Command, see Reichsmarine). In 1929 a third office was established: the Ministerial Office, whose Chief functioned as the political representative of the Minister. The role of the General Staff was filled by the Truppenamt.

The Social Democratic politician Gustav Noske became the first Minister of Defence of Germany. After the Nazi Machtergreifung, when the Reichswehr was recreated as the Wehrmacht in 1935, the ministry was renamed Reichskriegsministerium (Reich Ministry of War); also, the Heeresleitung became the Oberkommando des Heeres (OKH), the Marineleitung became the Oberkommando der Marine (OKM) and the Oberkommando der Luftwaffe (OKL) was newly created. The Ministeramt (Ministerial Office) was renamed the Wehrmachtsamt.

In 1938, following the Blomberg-Fritsch Affair, Hitler himself exercised the functions of the Reich War Minister. The Wehrmachtsamt was turned into the Oberkommando der Wehrmacht (OKW; High Command of the Armed Forces), which formally existed until the end of World War II. The High Command was not a government ministry, but a military command, however.

=== Post-WW2 ===
After World War II, West Germany started with preparations for rearmament (Wiederbewaffnung) in 1950, as ordered by Chancellor Konrad Adenauer. After the outbreak of the Korean War, the United States called for a West German contribution to the defence of Western Europe (against the Soviet Union). Initially Gerhard Graf von Schwerin, a former Wehrmacht General, advised the Chancellor on these issues and led the preparations, but after Count Schwerin had talked to the press about his work, he was replaced by Theodor Blank, who was appointed as "Special Representative" of the Chancellor. As the rearmament plans met with harsh opposition by a wide circle within the West German population and contradicted the occupation statute, the government office responsible for the rearmament acted secretly, unofficially known as Amt Blank. By 1955, the number of employees had surpassed 1,300. On 7 June 1955 the office became the Ministry of Defence, or Bundesministerium für Verteidigung in German. The Bundeswehr was established and Germany joined the NATO the same year. In 1956, Germany reintroduced conscription, and the German military force quickly became the largest conventional military force in Western Europe. To confirm the ministry's importance, it was renamed Bundesministerium der Verteidigung on 30 December 1961, similar to the German names of the "classic" ministries of Finance, the Interior and Justice — though the federal minister is still denoted as Bundesminister für Verteidigung in Article 65a of the German Constitution.

Until 1960, the ministry had its seat in the Ermekeil barracks in Bonn. From 1960 onwards, it was moved to a new building complex at Hardthöhe.

=== Post-reunification ===
After German reunification, the Bendlerblock, former seat of its Weimar Republic predecessor, became the secondary seat of the ministry in 1993. The German military has become increasingly engaged in international operations since the early 1990s, and saw combat in the 1999 Kosovo War.

=== 21st century ===
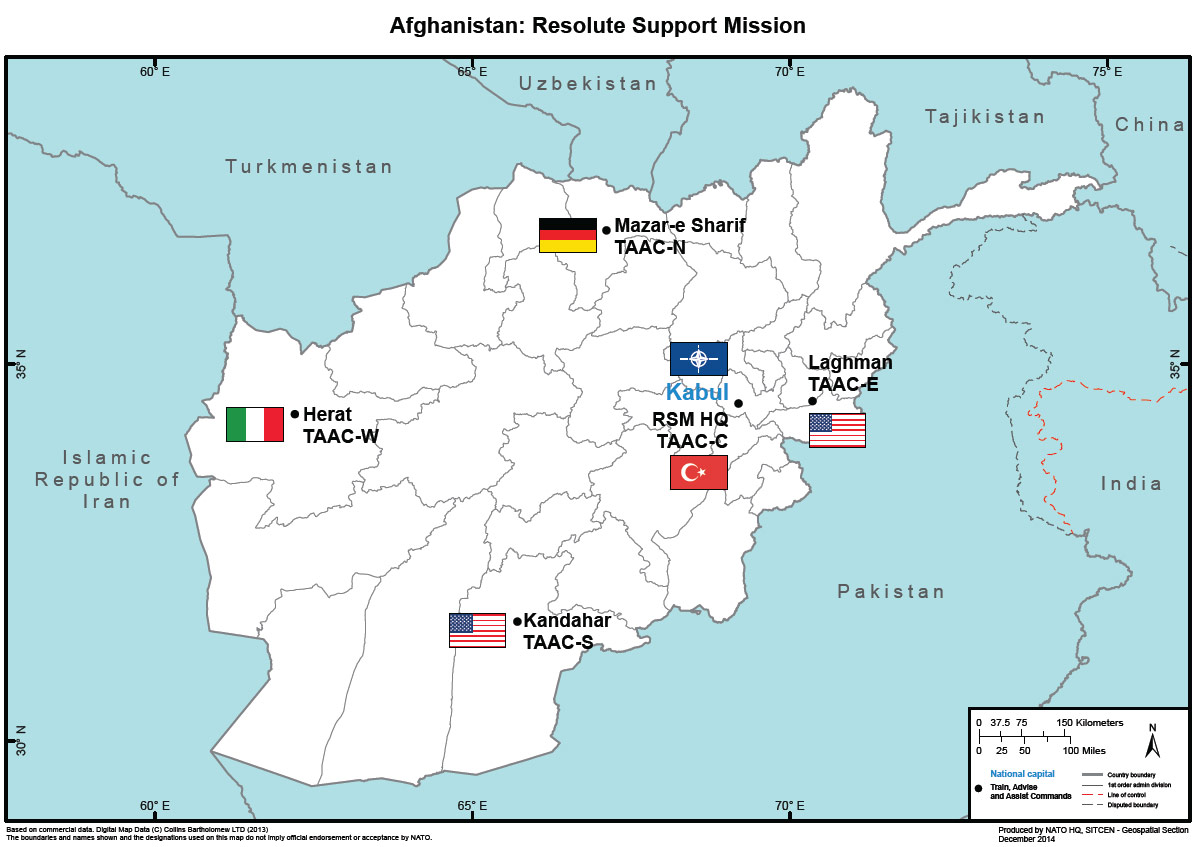
Map of Resolute Support Mission that documents the partition of responsibilities between allies: TAAC – Capital, TAAC – North, TAAC – South, TAAC – East, TAAC – West

Until the Fall of Kabul in August 2021, Germany deployed for nearly 20 years its armed forces in Afghanistan as part of the International Security Assistance Force (2001-2015) and later the Resolute Support Mission (2015-2021). German forces withdrew on 29 June.

== List of Federal Ministers of Defence (since 1955) ==
Political Party: CDU/CSU SPD

Name (Born-Died)		Portrait	Party	Term of Office		Duration	Chancellor (Cabinet)
Federal Minister for Defence (1955–1961) Federal Minister of Defence (1961–present)
1	Theodor Blank (1905–1972)		CDU	7 June 1955	16 October 1956	1 year, 131 days	Adenauer (II)
2	Franz Josef Strauß (1915–1988)		CSU	16 October 1956	9 January 1963	6 years, 85 days	Adenauer (II • III • IV)
3	Kai-Uwe von Hassel (1913–1997)		CDU	9 January 1963	1 December 1966	3 years, 326 days	Erhard (I • II)
4	Gerhard Schröder (1910–1989)		CDU	1 December 1966	21 October 1969	2 years, 324 days	Kiesinger (cabinet)
5	Helmut Schmidt (1918–2015)		SPD	22 October 1969	7 July 1972	2 years, 259 days	Brandt (I)
6	Georg Leber (1920–2012)		SPD	7 July 1972	16 February 1978	5 years, 224 days	Brandt (I • II); Schmidt (I • II)
7	Hans Apel (1932–2011)		SPD	17 February 1978	1 October 1982	4 years, 226 days	Schmidt (II • III)
8	Manfred Wörner (1934–1994)		CDU	4 October 1982	18 May 1988	5 years, 227 days	Kohl (I • II • III)
9	Rupert Scholz (born 1937)		CDU	18 May 1988	21 April 1989	338 days	Kohl (III)
10	Gerhard Stoltenberg (1928–2001)		CDU	21 April 1989	31 March 1992	2 years, 345 days	Kohl (III • IV)
11	Volker Rühe (born 1942)		CDU	1 April 1992	26 October 1998	6 years, 208 days	Kohl (IV • V)
12	Rudolf Scharping (born 1947)		SPD	27 October 1998	19 July 2002	3 years, 265 days	Schröder (I)
13	Peter Struck (1943–2012)		SPD	19 July 2002	22 November 2005	3 years, 126 days	Schröder (I • II)
14	Franz Josef Jung (born 1949)		CDU	22 November 2005	28 October 2009	3 years, 340 days	Merkel (I)
15	Karl-Theodor zu Guttenberg (born 1971)		CSU	28 October 2009	3 March 2011	1 year, 126 days	Merkel (II)
16	Thomas de Maizière (born 1954)		CDU	3 March 2011	17 December 2013	2 years, 289 days	Merkel (II)
17	Ursula von der Leyen (born 1958)		CDU	17 December 2013	17 July 2019	5 years, 212 days	Merkel (III • IV)
18	Annegret Kramp-Karrenbauer (born 1962)		CDU	17 July 2019	8 December 2021	2 years, 144 days	Merkel (IV)
19	Christine Lambrecht (born 1965)		SPD	8 December 2021	19 January 2023	1 year, 42 days	Scholz (cabinet)
20	Boris Pistorius (born 1960)		SPD	19 January 2023	Incumbent	3 years, 306 days	Scholz (cabinet)
20	Boris Pistorius (born 1960)		SPD	19 January 2023	Incumbent	3 years, 306 days	Merz (cabinet)

== See also ==
- List of German defence ministers
