= Joint Support Service Command (Germany) =

High command of the Joint Support Service of the Bundeswehr

Coordinates: 50.7008°N 7.0454°E

Joint Support Service Command — XXXX —
- Kommando Streitkräftebasis (KdoSKB)
- Insignia
- Active: 2012–2025
- Country: Germany
- Branch: Joint Support Service
- Type: High command
- Headquarters: Bonn
- Website: www.kommando.streitkraeftebasis.de

Commanders
- Current commander: Lieutenant General Martin Schelleis
- Current deputy commander: Lieutenant General Jürgen Weigt
- Current chief of staff: Major General Wilhelm Grün

The Joint Support Service Command (German: Kommando Streitkräftebasis, KdoSKB) was the high command of the Joint Support Service of the German armed forces, the Bundeswehr. The command was responsible for management and administration of the units and elements of the Joint Support Service, and for ensuring operational readiness across the armed services. Formed on 29 September 2012 as part of the restructuring of the Bundeswehr, it was based in Bonn. Its commander and deputy commander each had the rank of lieutenant general or vice admiral. It was dissolved in late April 2025 and replaced by the new Bundeswehr Joint Support Command.
