= German Armed Forces casualties in Afghanistan =

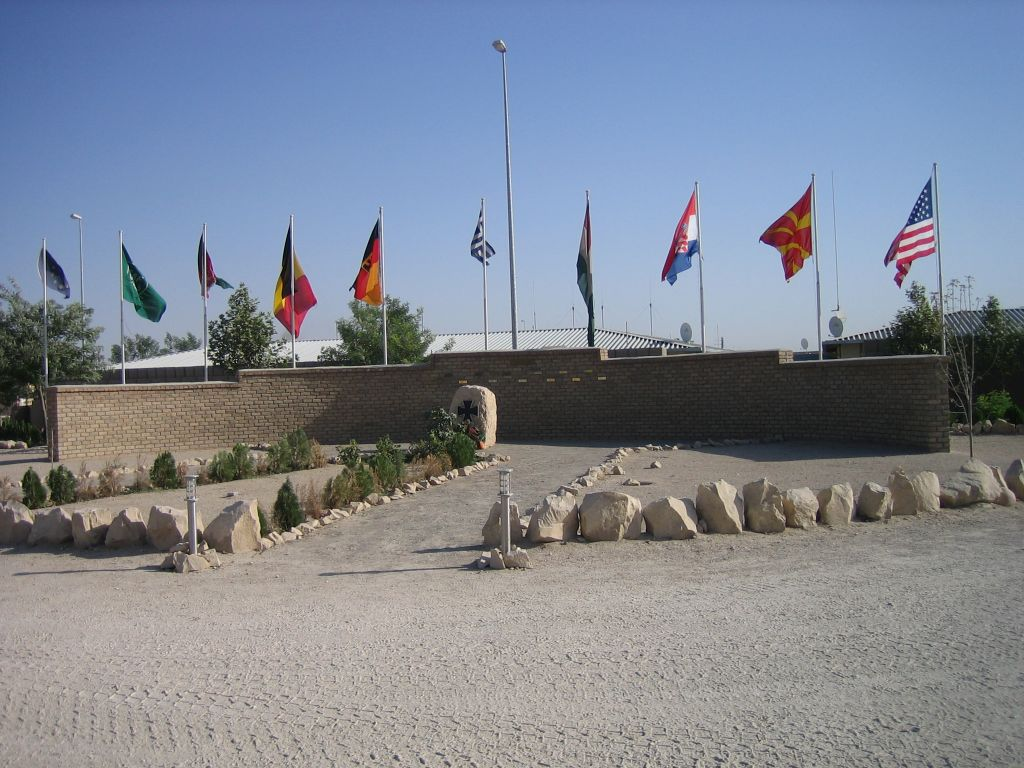
The memorial to the fallen and otherwise deceased German ISAF soldiers in the German camp at Kunduz

With over 150,000 soldiers from 2002 to 2021 deployed in the country, Germany was the second largest contributor of troops to coalition operations in Afghanistan. Although German troops mainly operated in the comparatively quiet north of the country, the Bundeswehr suffered a number of casualties during participation in the International Security Assistance Force mission in Afghanistan.

== Overview ==
As of June 29, 2021, 59 German soldiers and 3 policemen died in Afghanistan, with 35 being killed in combat. Among them were the first German reservists and policemen to fall to combat in deployment abroad since World War II. In addition to these fatalities, 245 German soldiers and 4 police officers suffered injuries of varying degrees caused by hostile activity.

== Controversy ==
The number of casualties caused public outcry in Germany as it was highest figure of all deployments abroad that the German army since World War II. Participation in the ISAF marks the first time since World War II that German ground troops have fought an organized enemy. Prior to 2002, the Bundeswehr had sustained only 5-7 deaths connected to hostile activity, including their first peacekeeping death, an army medic with United Nations troops in Cambodia who was killed in 1993.

As a direct result of the number of deaths, German Federal Minister of Defence, Franz Josef Jung, presented plans to establish a central memorial for fallen soldiers in Berlin on June 17, 2007. Furthermore, the Bundeswehr has unveiled a new order which is to honour acts of heroism achieved in deployments abroad: the Cross of Honour for Bravery.

An incident that occurred on June 26, 2005, which was at first declared an accident by the Cabinet of Germany turned out to have been an attack with a remote-controlled device.

An anonymous soldier, a staff sergeant, was found dead in his barracks in Mazar-i-Sharif. German officials classified the incident as a suicide.

In a statement published on February 2, 2008, Herr Jung mentioned a number of 26 German soldiers who had been killed in Afghanistan.

In a 2010 interview, Special Forces Command (KSK) commander Hans-Christoph Ammon said that no KSK soldiers had so far been killed in action. However, a press release from the US European Command confirmed that at least one KSK soldier was wounded in action in Afghanistan sometime between June and October 2005.

== Chronology of incidents ==
=== 2002 ===
Date	Location	Nature of incident	Circumstances	Situation Note: Ranks and unit names are listed in English for better understanding	Casualties
2002-02-15	Kabul, Ghazi Stadium	Hostile	Riots	Riots during a soccer match left five German and Austrian soldiers injured. Locals had tried to storm an overcrowded soccer stadium and attacked the soldiers who tried to block their way.	3 WIA
2002-03-06	Kabul	Non-hostile	Accidental explosion	Two German and three Danish soldiers died when the defusing of a S-125 Neva/Pechora Surface-to-Air-Missile failed. The missile had accidentally exploded due to a defect. Fatalities: Staff Sergeant Thomas Kochert, EOD Company 11; Staff Sergeant Mike Rubel, EOD Company 11	2 Killed
2002-12-21	Kabul	Non-hostile	Accidental helicopter crash	A CH-53GS helicopter crashed in Kabul. The exact reason for the crash, which was first thought to be enemy fire, turned out to be a mechanical failure concerning the Swashplate of the aircraft. Seven servicemen died. Fatalities: Captain Friedrich Deininger, Army Aviation Regiment 25; 1st Lieutenant Uwe Vierling, Army Aviation Regiment 15; Sergeant First Class Heinz-Ullrich Hewußt, Army Aviation Regiment 15; Sergeant First Class Thomas Schiebel, Army Aviation Regiment 25; Sergeant First Class Bernd Kaiser, Army Aviation Regiment 15; Sergeant Frank Ehrlich, Technical Center of the Air Force No.3; Private First Class Enrico Schmidt, Army Aviation Regiment 25	7 killed

=== 2003 ===
Date	Location	Nature of incident	Circumstances	Situation Note: Ranks and unit names are listed in English for better understanding	Casualties
2003-02-20	Kabul	Non-hostile	Natural causes	Fatality: Captain Holger Nippus, 1st German-Dutch Corps	1 dead
2003-05-17	Kabul	Non-hostile	Natural causes	Fatality: Major Alexander Hofert, Fighter Wing 33	1 dead
2003-05-29	South of Kabul	Hostile	Landmine	One serviceman died and one suffered injuries when the vehicle (Wolf) they were travelling in struck a landmine. They had been on a reconnaissance tour in the south of Kabul Fatality: Specialist Stefan Kamins, AMILGEO	1 KIA, 1 WIA
2003-06-07	Kabul, Kabul International Airport	Hostile	Suicide bomber attack	Four soldiers died and 29 suffered serious injuries when a suicide bomber in a taxi rammed the bus they were travelling in. The bus was not armoured. The soldiers were scheduled to leave Kabul on that day after a six-month deployment to Afghanistan. Fatalities: Sergeant First Class (Officer Cadet) Andreas Beljo, Signals Intelligence Regiment 940; Staff Sergeant Carsten Kühlmorgen, Signals Regiment 320; Staff Sergeant Helmi Jimenez-Paradis, Signals Regiment 320; Sergeant Jörg Baasch, Signals Intelligence Regiment 940	4 KIA, 31 WIA

=== 2004 ===
Date	Location	Nature of incident	Circumstances	Situation Note: Ranks and unit names are listed in English for better understanding	Casualties
2004-01-28	Kabul	Hostile	Bomb attack	Alleged Taliban-militants carried out simultaneous bomb attacks on British and German positions in Kabul. One British serviceman died and four British and German soldiers as well as five civilian contractors suffered injuries when the explosives were detonated.	2 WIA
2004-05-11	Kabul	Hostile	Rocket attack	A German soldier suffered injuries in a rocket attack in Kabul.	1 WIA
2004-09-26	Kunduz	Hostile	Mortar attack	Three German and two Swiss soldiers suffered injuries in an indirect fire mortar attack on their base in Kunduz; The base was heavily damaged. Local police repelled the attackers.	3 WIA
2004-10-17	Kunduz	Non-hostile	Suicide	Fatality: Private First Class Silvio Schattmann, Mechanized Infantry Battalion 371.	1 dead
2004-11-26	Kunduz	Hostile	IED	Three Germans suffered injuries when a IED exploded near their convoy on its route to Kunduz.	3 WIA

=== 2005 ===
Date	Location	Nature of incident	Circumstances	Situation Note: Ranks and unit names are listed in English for better understanding	Casualties
unknown	Khost province	Hostile	unknown	A special forces soldier with Kommando Spezialkräfte was wounded in action.	1 WIA
2005-06-25	Rustaq	Hostile	Bomb attack	Two German soldiers and six local helpers died when explosives they had seized were detonated by hostile forces. Fatalities: Sergeant First Class Andreas Heine, Engineer Regiment 100; Staff Sergeant Christian Schlotterhose, Engineer Regiment 100	2 KIA
2005-08-07	Kabul	Non-hostile	Vehicle accident	One serviceman died when the vehicle he was travelling in accidentally overturned. Fatality: Private First Class Boris Nowitzki, Artillery Training Battalion 345	1 killed
2005-11-14	Kabul	Hostile	Suicide bomber attack	A suicide bomber killed a German Army Reserve lieutenant colonel. He was the highest ranking Bundeswehr officer and first reservist to fall in Afghanistan. Two other German soldiers suffered injuries. A couple of attackers provoked a traffic accident with the Mercedes-Benz G-class in which the three soldiers were travelling so they were forced to leave their unarmoured vehicle. The suicide bomber then detonated the explosives in his Toyota Corolla, killing himself, the officer and wounding the two other soldiers. Fatality: Lieutenant Colonel (Reserve) Armin Franz, Reserve Battalion 901	1 KIA, 2 WIA

=== 2006 ===
Date	Location	Nature of incident	Circumstances	Situation Note: Ranks and unit names are listed in English for better understanding	Casualties
2006-02-22	Kunduz Area	Hostile	IED	An IED attack on a German patrol injured one soldier and resulted in the total loss of a Mercedes-Benz G-class.	1 WIA
2006-04-07	Kunduz Area	Hostile	IED	An IED attack against a German convoy on its route in Kunduz province injured three German soldiers and killed one bystander.	3 WIA
2006-04-07	Fayzabad Area	Hostile	Direct fire	A Monitoring and Observation Liaison Team (MOLT) of PRT Faizabad was ambushed during a night patrol halt. The attackers were repelled in an exchange of fire. The ambush left three Germans wounded.	3 WIA
2006-06-26	Kabul area	Hostile	Suicide bomber attack	A suicide bomb attack on a US convoy in Kabul killed several bystanders. A German vehicle within the convoy was heavily damaged, its driver suffering from minor injuries.	1 WIA
2006-06-28	Kunduz area	Hostile	Direct fire	An attack with small arms and RPGs on a German night patrol in Kunduz Province injured three German servicemen. During the firefight, a Fennek LSG and two other vehicles were lost due to damage. Several attackers were wounded or killed.	3 WIA
2006-12-17	Masar -e Sharif	Non-hostile	Accidental explosion	One soldier was killed when handling live ammunition. Fatality: Staff Sergeant Christian Kopp, Artillery Reconnaissance Battalion 121	1 killed

=== 2007 ===
Date	Location	Nature of incident	Circumstances	Situation Note: Ranks and unit names are listed in English for better understanding	Casualties
2007-05-19	Kunduz	Hostile	Suicide bomber attack	A suicide bomber killed ten people in a crowded market in Kunduz, including three German servicemen conducting a patrol. Furthermore, five other soldiers and 13 civilians suffered varying injuries. Fatalities: Captain (Reserve) Matthias Standfuß, Federal Office of Defense Administration; Staff Sergeant (Reserve) Michael Neumann, Navy Arsenal Kiel; Staff Sergeant (Reserve) Michael Diebel, Army Depot Darmstadt	3 KIA, 5 WIA
2007-08-15	Road to Jalalabad	Hostile	IED	An attack with a roadside bomb (IED) against a German convoy killed three policemen assigned to the German mission in Kabul. Together with colleagues they had been on their way to a shooting range. One of them was a member of the Federal Police elite unit GSG 9. Another had been the bodyguard of Chancellor Angela Merkel in Germany and was shortly to return to this position Fatalities: Police Inspector Jörg Ringel, Federal Criminal Investigation Office; Police Sergeant Alexander Stoffels, Federal Police; Police Sergeant Mario Keller, Federal Police	3 KIA, 1 WIA
2007-08-31	Kabul	Hostile	Suicide bomber attack	Two Afghan soldiers died and five Belgian and German soldiers suffered injuries when a suicide bomber attacked a German Military Police convoy at the main entrance of Kabul International Airport. Two armoured vehicles were damaged	2 WIA
2007-09-08	Mazar-i-Sharif	Non-hostile	Suicide	A serviceman was found dead in his barracks in Mazar-i-Sharif; The cause of death is very likely suicide. Fatality: Staff Sergeant, anonymous	1 killed
2007-10-05	Kunduz	Hostile	Suicide bomber attack	A suicide bomb attack against a German patrol near Kunduz injured three German soldiers, one of them seriously, and their Afghan interpreter. The assassin detonated himself next to a Wolf lightly armoured vehicle.	3 WIA

=== 2008 ===
Date	Location	Nature of incident	Circumstances	Situation Note: Ranks and unit names are listed in English for better understanding	Casualties
2008-03-27	Kunduz area	Hostile	IED	A Dingo Patrol Vehicle was turned over by a roadside bomb. Three soldiers suffered serious injuries.	3 WIA
2008-06-30	Kunduz province	Hostile	IED	An attack with an IED on a German patrol in Kunduz province injured three soldiers. One vehicle was damaged beyond repair.	3 WIA
2008-07-06	Kunduz province	Hostile	Suicide bomber attack	Three German police officers and several local people suffered injuries of varying degree when a suicide bomber in a car struck the vehicle in which they were travelling.	3 WIA
2008-08-06	Kunduz province	Hostile	Suicide bomber attack	A suicide bomber on a motorcycle wounded three Germans when he attacked an ISAF-patrol 35 miles south of Kunduz. One paratrooper died of the long-term effects of his injuries on 10/05/2009. Fatality: Specialist Patric Sauer, Paratrooper Battalion 263	1 KIA, 2 WIA
2008-08-15	Fayzabad province	Hostile	IED	An attack with an IED on a German patrol in Fayzabad province wounded two Germans.	2 WIA
2008-08-25	Termez, ISAF-base in Uzbekistan	Non-hostile	Natural cause	A serviceman was found dead in his barracks in Termez. His death was not attributed to external force. Fatality: Sergeant First Class Christian Cemnitz,	1 dead
2008-08-27	Kunduz Province	Hostile	IED	An attack with an IED killed one German soldier and wounded three others. Fatality: Sergeant First Class Mischa Meier, Paratrooper Battalion 263	1 KIA, 3 WIA
2008-09-23	Kunduz	Hostile	Suicide bomber attack	A suicide bomber in a car attacked a German patrol in Kunduz. Two vehicles were seriously damaged and one soldier suffered minor injuries.	1 WIA
2008-10-20	Kunduz	Hostile	Suicide bomber attack	Seven people were killed and several wounded when a suicide bomber attacked a German patrol. Two German soldiers were killed and two were wounded Fatalities: Sergeant Patrick Behlke, Paratrooper Battalion 263; Specialist Roman Schmidt, Paratrooper Battalion 263	2 KIA, 2 WIA
2008-11-15	Baghlan	Hostile	IED	Two German soldiers were wounded and several bystanders died when a German patrol was attacked with an IED.	2 WIA
2008-11-17	Faizabad	Hostile	IED	Four German soldiers were wounded and several bystanders were hurt when a German patrol was attacked with an IED.	4 WIA
2008-12-15	Kunduz	Hostile	Direct fire	Troops of PRT Kunduz were ambushed with RPGs and small arms fire. Three soldiers were wounded.	3 WIA
2008-12-24	Kunduz	Hostile	Direct fire	Troops of PRT Kunduz were ambushed with RPGs and small arms fire. One vehicle was lost to damage. Five soldiers suffered minor injuries.	5 WIA

=== 2009 ===
Date	Location	Nature of incident	Circumstances	Situation Note: Ranks and unit names are listed in English for better understanding	Casualties
2009-02-11	Mazar-i-Sharif	unknown	unknown	A German officer died from "mission-related causes" in Mazar-i-Sharif. Fatality: 2nd Lieutenant Alexander Janelt, Medical Regiment 32	1 killed
2009-03-14	Fayzabad	Non-hostile	Traffic accident	A German soldier died in a traffic accident in Fayzabad. Fatality: Private 1st Class Conrad Hötzel, Mechanized Infantry Battalion 371	1 dead, 2 injured
2009-04-29	Kunduz area	Hostile	Suicide bomber attack	Troops of PRT Kunduz were attacked by a suicide bomber in a car. One Dingo armoured personnel carrier was heavily damaged.	5 WIA
2009-04-29	Kunduz area	Hostile	Direct fire	Troops of PRT Kunduz were ambushed with RPG and small arms fire NW of Kunduz. One German soldier was killed in the firefight. Fatality: Private First Class Sergej Motz, Light Infantry Battalion 292	1 KIA, 10 WIA
2009-05-06 to 2009-05-07	Fayzabad Area	Hostile	Combat	German Special Forces Kommando Spezialkräfte conducted a clean and sweep operation 60 km SW of Fayzabad with the objective of arresting suspected Taliban leader Abdul Razeq. Abdul was taken prisoner after a chase through the mountains. One German soldier was injured during this mission.	1 WIA
2009-06-07	Kunduz	Hostile	Direct fire	Troops of PRT Kunduz were ambushed with IED followed by small arms fire and RPGs south of Kunduz. One Taliban fighter was killed, two others were wounded. Two coalition soldiers were wounded. One Dingo was damaged.	2 WIA
2009-06-23	Kunduz	Hostile	Combat	German and Afghan troops battled the Taliban in Kunduz. During this operation, three Germans were killed and three others were wounded in action when their vehicle slid down a bank and turned over. Three Taliban fighters were also killed. Fatalities: Private First Class Alexander Schleiernick, Paratrooper Battalion 263; Private First Class Oleg Meiling, Mechanized Infantry Battalion 391; Private First Class Martin Brunn, Mechanized Infantry Battalion 391	3 KIA,3 WIA
2009-08-03	Sheberghan	Non-hostile	Traffic accident	Six soldiers were wounded when their Dingo was involved in an accident during a patrol	6 WIA
2009-08-07	Kunduz	Hostile	Direct fire	A German unit was ambushed about 4 km NW of Kunduz. The attackers were repelled. One soldier was wounded.	1 WIA
2009-08-15	Kunduz	Hostile	Direct fire	Troops of PRT Kunduz were ambushed with RPGs and small arms fire near of Kunduz. One Soldier was wounded.	1 WIA
2009-09-03	Kunduz	Hostile	Combat	Troops of PRT Kunduz were ambushed with RPGs and small arms fire. German Troops returned fire, killing at least three Taliban. During the firefight four German soldiers were wounded and several vehicles were damaged, one vehicle was lost.	4 WIA
2009-09-05	Kunduz	Hostile	SVBIED attack	An attack with an SVBIED on a German patrol 3 km NE of Kunduz resulted in five wounded German soldiers	5 WIA
2009-09-16	Kunduz	Hostile	Combat	Troops of the PRT Kunduz were ambushed with RPGs and small arms fire 12 km S of Kunduz. One Fuchs was damaged. due to a RPG hit. Eight (one seriously) German soldiers were wounded during the two hour battle.	8 WIA
2009-11-11	Kunduz	Hostile	Direct fire	German and Afgahn National Army (ANA) troops were ambushed with small arms 5 km SW of Kunduz. One German serviceman was wounded during the fight.	1 WIA
2009-12-05	Mazar-i-Sharif	Non-hostile	Accidental explosion	Three Bundeswehr soldiers were injured by an explosion in their camp.	3 injured
2009-12-14	Eshkashem	Non-hostile	Accident	Five soldiers got carbon monoxide poisoning caused by a damaged heating device.	5 injured
2009-12-16	Kunduz	Hostile	Combat	During a joint operation of German soldiers with Afghan and Belgian forces west of Kunduz, German troops were attacked with small arms and RPGs by insurgents. Two German soldiers were wounded during the fighting, as well as one member of the Afghan security forces. One of the German soldiers rejoined the operation after medical treatment at the scene, the other one was seriously wounded by RPG shrapnel and had to be taken to the field-hospital in Kunduz. The fighting lasted for several hours.	2 WIA

=== 2010 ===
Date	Location	Nature of incident	Circumstances	Situation Note: Ranks and unit names are listed in English for better understanding	Casualties
2010-01-28	Chahar Darreh District	Hostile	Direct fire	German forces, alongside Afghan and Belgian troops, were repeatedly attacked with small arms by insurgents SW of PRT Kunduz. The allied forces returned fire. No German troops or allies were harmed during the incident. A short time later that day, German infantry was attacked by insurgents with small arms and RPGs, this time one German soldier was seriously wounded. He was taken to Mazar-I-Sharif for medical treatment.	1 WIA
2010-02-17	Kunduz / Isa Khel	Hostile	Direct fire	A German patrol was attacked with small arms and RPGs by insurgents about 5 km W of PRT Kunduz. German troops returned fire. Three German soldiers were slightly wounded during the incident.	3 WIA
2010-03-05	Kunduz	Hostile	Direct fire	German forces were attacked with small arms and RPGs by insurgents about five kilometres SW of PRT Kunduz. The German troops returned fire and called in close air support. One soldier was wounded in combat and received medical treatment in the field from a mobile medical team.	1 WIA
2010-04-02	Kunduz	Hostile	Combat	Three German soldiers were killed in action and eight others wounded (4 of them severely), when they were ambushed by a large number of insurgents 6 km west of Kunduz during the Good Friday Battle. One Dingo APC was badly damaged and had to be destroyed. Fatalities: Sergeant First Class Nils Bruns, Paratrooper Battalion 373; Specialist Robert Hartert, Paratrooper Battalion 373; Private First Class Martin Kadir Augustyniak, Paratrooper Bataillon 373	3 KIA, 8 WIA
2010-04-15	Route to Baghlan	Hostile	IED Blast / Mortar Attack	Four German soldiers were killed and five wounded during a series of attacks in Kunduz province. One patrol vehicle hit an IED and an ambulance vehicle suffered a direct hit from a mortar round. The wounded were flown to the base in Mazar-e Sharif for medical treatment Fatalities: Major Jörn Radloff, Non-Commissioned Officer School of the Army; Major (medical officer) Thomas Broer MD, Army Hospital Ulm; Sergeant First Class Marius Dubnicki, Mountain Engineer Battalion 8; Sergeant Josef Kronawitter, Mountain Engineer Battalion 8	4 KIA, 5 WIA
2010-05-20	Kunduz	Hostile	IED	German forces were attacked with an IED north of Kunduz. One German soldier was lightly wounded and one Dingo APC damaged in the incident.	1 WIA
2010-06-09	Kunduz	Hostile	IED	German forces were attacked with two IEDs and an RPG about 9 km SW of Kunduz. One German soldier was slightly wounded.	1 WIA
2010-06-13	Kunduz	Hostile	IED	German forces were attacked with an IED about 11 km west of Kunduz. Two German soldiers were wounded, one severely. One vehicle was damaged in the incident.	2 WIA
2010-06-19	Feyzabad	Hostile	IED	German forces were attacked with an IED about 60 km south of PRT Feyzabad. Three German soldiers and one Afghan interpreter were wounded. One soldier sustained severe injuries. One Dingo vehicle was severely damaged in the incident.	3 WIA
2010-06-20	Kunduz	Hostile	IED / Direct fire	German forces were attacked with an IED about 8 km NW of PRT Kunduz. One Dingo vehicle was damaged. in the incident. When German troops tried to recover the damaged vehicle two hours later, they were attacked with another IED blast, small arms fire and RPGs. The soldiers returned fire and called in Close-Air-Support. In this second incident, two German soldiers were wounded by the IED explosion.	2 WIA
2010-07-10	Kunduz	Hostile	IED	German forces were attacked with an IED about 12 km W of PRT Kunduz. When reinforcements arrived a second IED detonated and the troops were attacked with small arms fire, too. Two German soldiers were lightly wounded during the incidents and two vehicles were damaged. A recently deployed PzH2000 in Kunduz fired its first rounds in combat to provide support for the troops.	2 WIA
2010-07-19	Kunduz	Hostile	IED	A joint German and Afghan patrol was attacked with an IED about 12 km SW of PRT Kunduz. A Fuchs was damaged. and four German soldiers were slightly wounded.	4 WIA
2010-07-31	Pol-e-Khomri	Hostile	Direct fire	A joint ANA and Bundeswehr patrol was attacked with small arms fire by insurgents about 12 km N of Pol-e-Khomri. The fighting lasted several hours. One German soldier was lightly wounded while trying to reach a covered position.	1 WIA
2010-09-14	Kunduz	Hostile	IED	German soldiers were attacked with an IED about 11 km NW of PRT Kunduz. One German soldier, who was lightly wounded, was brought to the medical centre at PRT Kunduz for further medical treatment. Reports say that while investigating the scene of the attack German ISAF forces were fired upon with small arms, RPGs and mortars. The soldiers returned fire and continued their mission. No soldiers were harmed in the second attack.	1 WIA
2010-10-07	Baghlan Province	Hostile	Suicide bomber attack	German ISAF forces were attacked by a suicide bomber north of PRT Pol-e-Khomri, near Aka-Khel. One German soldier was killed and six were wounded, two seriously. While securing the site of the suicide attack, the German forces were attacked with mortar and small arms fire. German forces returned fire. The fighting continued for some time during which eight more German soldiers were wounded. Three of the casualties had to be treated at Mazar-e Sharif field hospital. Fatality: Staff Sergeant Florian Pauli, Paratrooper Battalion 313	1 KIA, 14 WIA
2010-10-11	Baghlan Province	Accident	Traffic Accident	Six German soldiers were slightly injured in a traffic accident in the Pol-e-Khomri area	6 injured
2010-10-17	Kunduz	Hostile	Direct fire	German soldiers were attacked about 10 km W of Kunduz. The soldiers returned fire with mortars, MARDER IFVs and their Milan missiles. They also had the PzH2000 firing in support from Kunduz. Air support was called in which used its cannons to fight enemy positions. The fighting lasted several hours. One German soldier was wounded in the engagement and had to be airlifted to the medical centre at PRT Kunduz and was then brought to Mazar-e Sharif trauma center. He had to be flown to Germany on a Med Evac Airbus A310 MRT for further medical treatment on October 18.	1 WIA
2010-10-26	Kunduz	Hostile	IED	German forces were attacked with an IED around 11 km west of PRT Kunduz. The partly dismounted troops were searching for hidden explosive devices when one IED went off under a FUCHS TPz vehicle. Two German soldiers were lightly wounded, one FUCHS vehicle was slightly damaged.	2 WIA
2010-10-31	Kunduz	Hostile	IED	German forces were fired on during an operation about 4 km W of PRT Kunduz. Later on in that operation, two German soldiers were lightly wounded and two vehicles slightly damaged by two IEDs about 7 km W of PRT Kunduz. The troops continued their operation and were repeatedly attacked by insurgents. Artillery support was called in. A third attack with an IED resulted in only a lightly damaged vehicle.	2 WIA
2010-11-03	Kunduz	Hostile	Direct fire	German forces are engaged in an offensive operation in the area west of PRT Kunduz since October 31. This operation was conducted with the ANA and other coalition forces. One German soldier was lightly wounded in an engagement with enemy forces.	1 WIA
2010-11-21	Kunduz	Hostile	IED	German forces were attacked with an IED around 6 km north of PRT Kunduz. Three German soldiers were wounded, and one LGS Fenneck was damaged but successfully recovered.	3 WIA
2010-12-06	Baghlan–i Jadid	Hostile	Direct fire	German forces were attacked with small arms fire and RPGs, 8 km NW of Pol-i Khomri. Two German soldiers were wounded, one Marder IFV was damaged.	2 WIA
2010-12-15	Kandahar	Hostile	Direct fire	German forces had a brief encounter with a militant sniper, Colonel Adolf Schrodinger was wounded.	1 WIA
2010-12-17	Baghlan–i Jadid	Non-hostile	Accidental discharge	A German soldier was killed by an accidental weapon discharge. Fatality: Private First Class Oliver Oertelt, Mountain Infantry Battalion 232	1 Killed

=== 2011 ===
Date	Location	Nature of incident	Circumstances	Situation Note: Ranks and unit names are listed in English for better understanding	Casualties
2011-01-11	Pol-e Khomri	Non-hostile	Accidental discharge	A German soldier was wounded by an accidental discharge.	1 injured
2011-01-29	Ghara, Kunduz Province	Hostile	IED	A German patrol struck a roadside bomb. One vehicle was damaged and two soldiers were wounded.	2 WIA
2011-02-13	Imam Sahib area, Kunduz Province	Hostile	IED	A German soldier was wounded when his APC struck an IED.	1 WIA
2011-02-18	Baghlan–i Jadid	Hostile	Direct fire	Three German soldiers were killed and six wounded when an Afghan soldier turned against the allies before being killed himself. Fatalities: Sergeant First Class Georg Missulia (30), Mechanized Infantry Battalion 112; Corporal Konstantin Menz (22), Mechanized Infantry Battalion 112; Private First Class Georg Kurat (21), Mechanized Infantry Battalion 112	3 KIA, 6 WIA
2011-05-03	Kunduz	Hostile	IED	Three different German patrols were struck by IEDs around the area of PRT Kunduz. Two IMV Dingo were damaged and five soldiers wounded.	5 WIA
2011-05-18	Taloqan	Hostile	violent Protest	German troops at a base in Talokan was attacked with hand grenades and Molotov Cocktails when protests in front of the base turned violent.	3 WIA
2011-05-25	14 km NW of Kunduz	Hostile	IED	A German Fuchs APC was involved in an IED explosion resulting in the death of one 33-year-old Captain from the German Special Operations Division, another German soldier was injured. An Afghan interpreter was also wounded in the blast. Fatality: Captain Markus Matthes (33), Special Operations Division	1 KIA, 1 WIA
2011-05-28	Taloqan, Takhar province	Hostile	IED	Two German soldiers were killed in a suicide bomb attack that also claimed the lives of Afghan police chief, General Mohammed Duad Duad and the Takhar Provincial Chief of Police. Five German soldiers were wounded - among them Bundeswehr General Markus Kneip, commander of the ISAF for Northern Afghanistan. Fatalities: Master Sergeant Tobias Lagenstein (31), Military Police Battalion 151; Major Thomas Tholi (43), Command Support Battalion 282	2 KIA, 5 WIA
2011-06-02	Kunduz, 36 km southbound of Kunduz	Hostile	IED	One German soldier was killed by an IED, five were wounded. Fatalities: Corporal Alexej Kobelew (23), Armoured Infantry Battalion 212, Armoured Brigade 21 Lipperland	1 KIA, 5 WIA
2011-06-08	1 km N of Camp Marmal, Masar-i Scharif	Non-hostile	Traffic Accident	Five German soldiers and one Afghan civilian were seriously injured after a traffic accident involving a German Fuchs APC and a civilian car.	5 WIA
2011-06-08	Near Chahar Dara District headquarters	Hostile	Assault	During a foot march, a German patrol was pelted with stones. One soldier suffered injuries to the head.	1 WIA
2011-06-19	3 km NW of PRT Kunduz	Hostile	IED	In the early morning an IED attack on German forces was carried out in the Kunduz area, killing several civilians and wounding two German servicemen. Two Dingo vehicles were damaged and had to be salvaged. Colonel Norbert Sabrautzki, the commanding officer of PRT Kunduz who was travelling in another vehicle of the convoy, remained unharmed.	2 WIA
2011-06-23	500 m outside PRT Kunduz	Non-hostile	Faulty equipment	Due to a technical fault in a Marder IFV three German soldiers were injured, one severely. The troops had come into contact with heated coolant that was leaking out of the vehicle.	3 injured
2011-06-28	Camp Hazrat-e Sultan, Samangan Province	Non-hostile	Accidental discharge	On 28 July one German soldier accidentally discharged his weapon into his foot. Two nearby soldiers suffered an acoustic shock.	3 injured
2011-08-23	Camp Marmal, Mazar-e-Sharif	Non-hostile	Accidental discharge	During a security check, a German soldier accidentally fired his weapon. Another soldier suffered severe head injuries, a third one suffered a shock.	2 injured
2011-08-25	6 km N of PRT Fayzabad	Non-hostile	Traffic accident	An Eagle IV armoured vehicle turned over while on a nightly patrol. The accident left three German soldiers wounded, another one was hurt during the salvage.	4 injured
2011-08-30	OP North	Non-hostile	Accident	During construction works, one German soldier was hurt at the head by a rock.	1 injured
2011-09-09	15 km W of Kunduz	Hostile	IED	On 9 September 2011 an IED attack on a German patrol was carried out. One German soldier was injured and one Enok patrol vehicle was damaged.	1 WIA
2011-09-15	OP North	Non-hostile	Accidental discharge	During a firearms training one soldier accidentally shot himself in the foot with his handgun.	1 injured
2011-09-15	38 km NE of Kunduz	Hostile	IED, combat	A German patrol was attacked with an IED causing a non-armoured vehicle to drive off the road and injured one soldier. At the same time, about a dozen insurgents where shooting at the patrol. The patrol returned the fire and ordered a "show of force" by close air support causing the insurgents to retreat. In the shooting, three more German soldiers sustained injuries.	4 WIA
2011-10-19	15 km NW of Pol-e Khomri	Hostile	IED	A German patrol was attacked with an IED. One soldier was wounded.	1 WIA
2011-11-23	35 km SW of PRT Kunduz	Hostile	IED	Two German soldiers were wounded by an IED.	2 WIA
2011-11-29	Baghlan	Hostile	IED	A joint patrol of German soldiers and ANA was attacked with an IED. One German soldier sustained injuries and one Fennek vehicle was damaged.	1 WIA
2011-12-02	E of Mazar-i-Sharif	Non-hostile	Traffic accident	Three German soldiers were lightly injured in a traffic accident.	3 injured
2011-12-12	Near PRT Kunduz	Non-hostile	Ricochet	One German soldier was hurt by a ricochet from a Heckler & Koch G36 rifle.	1 injured
2011-12-20	1 km off PRT Kunduz	Non-hostile	Traffic accident	On 20 December 2011 a German Dingo vehicle collided with an undisclosed American vehicle. The accident left three German and two American servicemen injured.	2 injured

=== 2012 ===
Date	Location	Nature of incident	Circumstances	Situation Note: Ranks and unit names are listed in English for better understanding	Casualties
2012-01-05	Camp Marmal	Non-hostile	Accident	A German soldier was injured by acid when a battery accidentally exploded.	1 injured
2012-03-13	PRT Kunduz	Non-hostile	Accidental discharge	Three German soldiers suffered an acoustic shock when a G36 rifle accidentally discharged inside a Dingo vehicle.	3 injured
2012-07-04	10 km S of Kunduz	Hostile	Combat	A German patrol was attacked with small arms and RPGs in an area 10 km south of Kunduz. The patrol returned fire and the resulting combat lasted for half an hour. Two soldiers were injured and one Dingo vehicle was damaged.	2 WIA

=== 2013 ===
Date	Location	Nature of incident	Circumstances	Situation Note: Ranks and unit names are listed in English for better understanding	Casualties
2013-05-04	Near OP North, Baghlan Province	Hostile	Combat	While supporting an Afghan operation against insurgents, German KSK special forces were attacked in Baghlan Province. One soldier was killed, another one was injured. According to the German Minister of Defence, Thomas de Maizière, this was the first KSK member that died in Afghanistan.	1 KIA, 1 WIA
2013-06-06	Camp Marmal, Mazar-e-Sharif	Non-hostile	Suicide	A soldier was found with a self-inflicted gunshot wound at Camp Marmal.	1 dead

=== 2015 ===
Date	Location	Nature of incident	Circumstances	Situation Note: Ranks and unit names are listed in English for better understanding	Casualties
2015-09-29	Camp Marmal, Mazar-e-Sharif	Non-hostile	Natural causes	A 49-year-old sergeant major was found dead in his room at Camp Marmal. According to initial findings, the Bundeswehr assumed a natural cause of death.	1 dead
2015-10-04	Germany	Non-hostile	Suicide	A soldier who was involved in operations in Afghanistan committed suicide in Germany.	1 dead

=== 2018 ===
Date	Location	Nature of incident	Circumstances	Situation Note: Ranks and unit names are listed in English for better understanding	Casualties
2018-01-14	Germany	Non-hostile	Suicide	A soldier who was involved in operations in Afghanistan committed suicide in Germany.	1 dead

=== 2019 ===
Date	Location	Nature of incident	Circumstances	Situation Note: Ranks and unit names are listed in English for better understanding	Casualties
2019-10-03	Camp Marmal, Mazar-e-Sharif	Non-hostile	Suicide	A soldier was found dead in his accommodation container at Camp Marmal. Fatality: Staff Sergeant Waldemar Zitzer	1 dead

== See also ==
- Operation Karez
