= Counterinsurgency in Northern Afghanistan =

Part of the War in Afghanistan (2001–2021)

- Part of the War in Afghanistan (2001–2021)
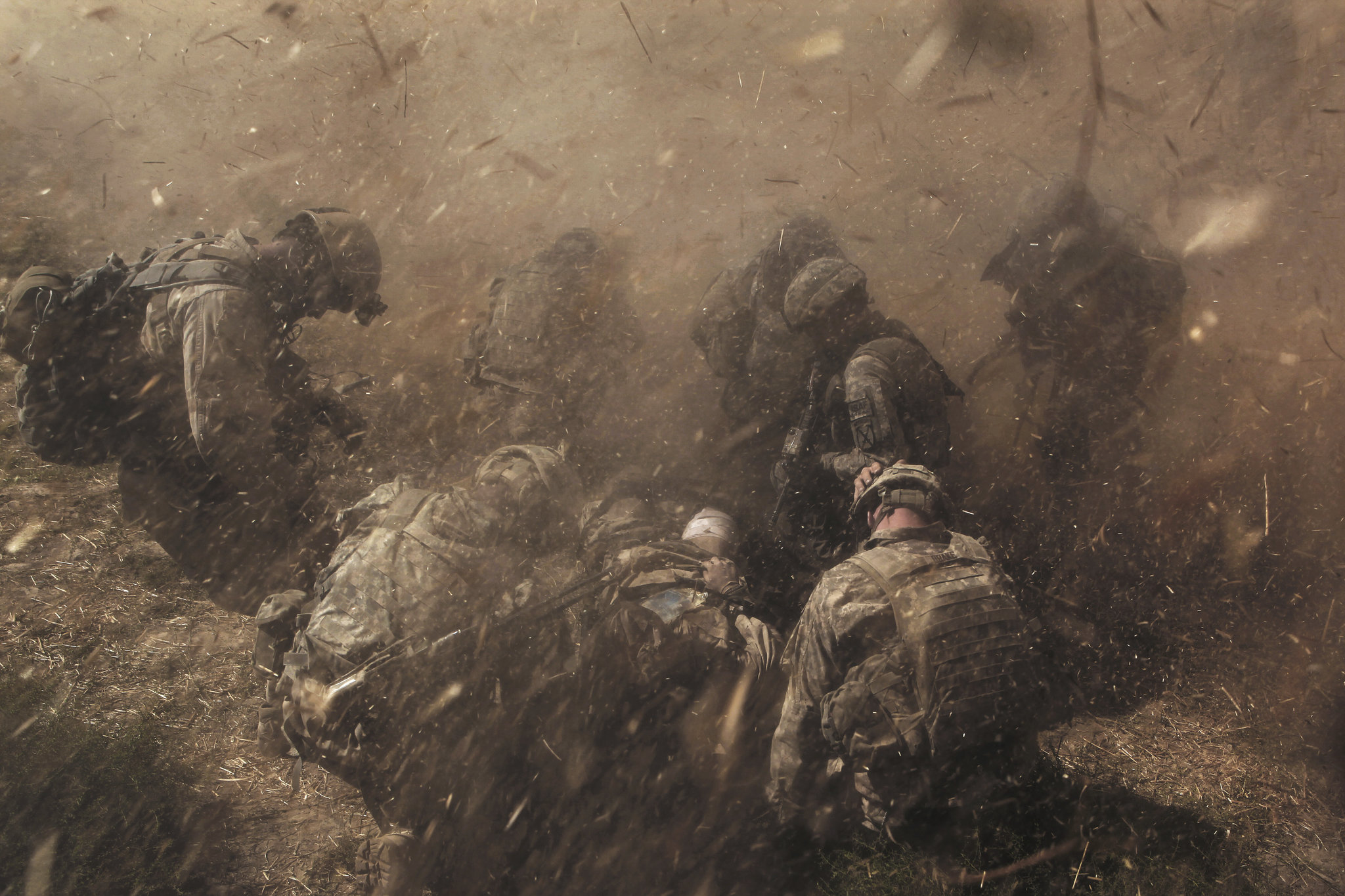
- 10th Mountain Division Soldiers tend to a wounded comrade as a MEDEVAC helicopter lands
Date	April 2009 – December 2014
Location	Northern Afghanistan
Result	Gradual "Afghanization" of combat operations during drawdown of ISAF forces; de facto status quo ante bellum

Belligerents
Coalition; Germany; United States; France; Afghanistan; Belgium; Sweden; Norway; Finland; Croatia	Insurgents; Taliban al-Qaeda; Hezb-e Islami Gulbuddin (Islamic Movement of Uzbekistan) Islamic Movement of Uzbekistan; Various foreign fighters

Commanders and leaders
Coalition (United States) John R. Allen (Germany) Jörg Vollmer (Islamic Republic of Afghanistan) Ali Murat (United States) Sean Mulholland (Norway) Joar Fjellstad (Belgium) Jacky Cabo (Sweden) Gustav Fahl Notable leadership (Germany) Markus Kneip (WIA) (Germany) Jörg Vollmer (Germany) Georg Klein (Germany) Jared Sembritzki (Germany) Michael Matz (Belgium) E. Goudemant	Insurgents (Taliban) Maulawi Shamsullah Notable leadership (Taliban) Qari Bashir Haqqani † (Taliban) Qari Sidiqullah † (Taliban) Mullah Ahsanullah † (Taliban) Mullah Bahador † (Taliban) Mullah Abdul Salam (#) (Taliban) Qari Wadoud (#)

Strength
Coalition exceeding 11,220 (United States) 5,000+ troops (Germany) 5,000+ troops (Sweden) 500 troops (Norway) 400 troops (Belgium) 400 troops (Islamic Republic of Afghanistan) 3 brigades, unknown number of militia and police	Insurgents up to 4,500 (Taliban) bulk of the force 500+ (Islamic Movement of Uzbekistan) 200+ (al-Qaeda) up to 50 Various foreign fighters up to 100

Casualties and losses
Coalition at least 570 (Islamic Republic of Afghanistan) 50+ KIA, 150+ WIA, several MIA (Germany) 35 KIA, 262 WIA (United States) 25 KIA, 105 WIA (Norway) 5 KIA, 34 WIA (Sweden) 5 KIA, 30 WIA; Others 3 KIA, 10 WIA	Insurgents; 3,500+ (Taliban) 1,935+ KIA, 855+ WIA, 350+ POW; 300+ KIA (al-Qaeda) 4 KIA (Islamic Movement of Uzbekistan) 26 KIA; Foreign Fighters 30+ KIA
- Civilian casualties at least 120 killed or wounded 3 contractors killed

German and Afghan troops advance into hostile territory

The following addresses the events in Northern Afghanistan between April 2009 and 2014. While this part of the country had long been relatively peaceful compared to the all-out war zones of the south and east, tensions would flare up again in 2008 when the German soldiers deployed to the area came under attack more often, leading to the deaths of several soldiers. Previously hindered by national caveats, the deteriorating security situation prompted the German-led Regional Command North to launch a series of operations to take on the rising insurgency. Concerted operations began after an insurgent attack on PRT Kunduz within minutes of German Chancellor Angela Merkel's departure from a visit. Within two years, the German presence would be doubled, along with a deployment by the United States Army's elite 10th Mountain Division. These additional reinforcements from ISAF were called in, which would set the pace for an extremely aggressive and bloody campaign of the war.

== Initial situation ==
When German troops took over nominal control over Afghanistan's north in 2003, the area was counted among the safest in the whole country, with places such as Kunduz earning the nickname "Bad Kundus" (roughly: Kunduz resort and spa) among German troops due to the notable absence of greater threats to peace and security. This misjudgment was partially a result of the caveat-ridden German military's approach to keeping the peace in the area, reaching out not far enough to actually meet resistance. However, with an increasing toll from suicide and roadside bomb attacks it soon became obvious that NATO's dangerously restrained and considerably under-strength forces in the area—especially from Germany and Hungary—were not able to maintain public order in rural areas. Moreover, a Pashtun minority in several regional "pockets" began to gradually change allegiance and support opposition movements against both foreign troops and other Afghan ethnicities. These conditions would eventually facilitate the insurgency's arrival in the north and threaten a crucial line of communications between the northern border of Afghanistan and Kabul, the capital. Due to similar problems in Regional Command West's area of responsibility, other insurgent groups and bands of criminals were able to get a foothold in the far west of Regional Command North as well.

Qari Bashir Haqqani, the Taliban commander for Kunduz province, had in 2008 already vowed to increase his men's efforts against the Germans. Reluctant to engage directly, the Taliban mainly relied on guerilla tactics, killing three Germans over the year and wounding more than thirty along with causing casualties among the mountain Afghan security forces. This trend continued until 2009 (hitherto German troops had only been involved in a handful of firefights with opposing forces). In mid-2009 though, the number of direct contacts had already exceeded the total of the prior seven years. A similar development struck Faryab province and the surrounding districts: having already taken action to rout the Taliban, the Norwegian forces of PRT Meymaneh saw themselves increasingly threatened by insurgent activities.

ISAF commander Stanley McChrystal expressed his concerns about Northern Afghanistan. He described Kunduz, Baghlan and the northwest of the country as places where security was deteriorating in a particularly worrying manner, requiring the concerted actions of all allies.

With casualties rising, Berlin agreed to revise its contingent's rules of engagement. The German military immediately began joint operations with Afghan security forces in accordance with ISAF's "Afghan-face" strategy in April 2009, and continued to conduct its own operations to improve security as well as supporting other allies in their operations. Halfway through the year, three major hotspots of anti-government and anti-ISAF activity had been identified: Kunduz's Chardara district with the adjacent road to Baghlan province, Baghlan province itself, and the western Faryab province.

Following the Kunduz airstrike against two captured fuel tankers in September 2009 which killed insurgents as well as scores of civilians who had gathered to steal fuel from a Taliban-captured fuel truck, the German government finally reclassified the Afghanistan deployment in February 2010 as an "armed conflict within the parameters of international law", allowing German forces to act without risk of prosecution under German law. While the German contingent had previously relied on lightly armoured and -armed infantry mobility vehicles such as the Dingo and the Fennek armoured reconnaissance vehicle (along with unarmoured utility vehicles), heavy weapons were now brought to the area. While addressing troops in the wake of a deadly attack on April 15, 2010, then Minister of Defence Karl-Theodor zu Guttenberg announced his decision to deploy Marder infantry fighting vehicles and Pzh2000 self propelled artillery to Kunduz in order to better protect troops and "max" their "punch". The military would also go on to acquire new weapons and vehicles better suited for combat in the hot and rugged Afghan countryside. Around the same time, US forces were called into Northern Afghanistan to reinforce the German contingent and provide Regional Command North with direly needed aviation and air mobility assets. ISAF's headquarters in Kabul decided to upgrade its northern presence and placed a German Major-General in command.

== Order of battle ==
Afghan government and allied forces

- Afghan National Army
  - 209th Corps (Afghanistan)
    - 3 brigades (12 battalions)
  - Operational Mentoring and Liaison Team (22 advisors)
- Afghan National Police
- Afghan militia
  - Governors' militias
  - Local self-defense groups
- United States Armed Forces
  - United States Army
  - 10th Mountain Division
  - Special Forces
  - Delta Force
  - 75th Ranger Regiment
  - United States Air Force
- Bundeswehr
  - Regional Command North (Regionalkommando Nord)

Insurgents

- Taliban
- al-Qaeda
- Islamic Movement of Uzbekistan
- Hezb-e Islami Gulbuddin
- Several other militant factions and militias

== Operations ==
Concerted operations began with numerous raids and "provocative patrols" into the Taliban heartland, already dubbed "Talibania" by German troops. Four insurgents and two ANA soldiers were killed in various engagements and more than 40 insurgents were captured, with large amounts of weapons and explosives seized. German troops tried to maintain a presence even in remote areas during these weeks and were frequently attacked in the face of an overall deteriorating situation in all RC-North: On April 17, 2010, a Norwegian officer was killed when his patrol struck a roadside bomb. On April 29, German troops made a concentrated advance into Chardara district and suffered 15 casualties when they were attacked by suicide bombers and came under heavy fire by an overwhelming insurgent force. A trooper of 2nd company, 292nd Light Infantry Battalion was killed in action, marking the first time since World War II that a German soldier would fall in combat. German troops were attacked regularly during the following weeks.

Another attempt to regain control over Chardara was initiated on May 7. By late noon, a large group of insurgents assaulted a German infantry detachment reconnoitering the district's borders. Responding reinforcements surrounded the attackers and battled them for more than a day in a fierce engagement which also involved allied close air support and Afghan forces, of whom one police officer was wounded in action. At least seven insurgents were killed, 14 more wounded and numerous captured. On the same day, troops of PRT Faizabad conducted an operation to detain notable leaders of the insurgency in Northern Afghanistan; A high-profile arrest was made when German special forces operatives arrested Abdul Razeq, the Taliban commander for Northeast Afghanistan. One KSK operative suffered minor wounds.

Additionally reinforcements were deployed to PRT Kunduz, almost doubling the garrison there. The security situation had turned notably worse. All girl schools in Chardara had to be closed for fear of imminent terrorist attacks. Manpower shortages did not allow German forces to uphold a permanent deterrence against armed militias, crippling the long-term effect of their actions. However, German and Afghan troops increased their efforts to take on the Taliban in different operations of various character. On May 15, ANSF killed Qari Sidiqulla, a Taliban district commander for Imam Sahib, in Imam Sahib's Sharawan region. Three of his fighters were also killed. In the same week, the Taliban tried to assassinate Mohammad Omar, the Governor of Kunduz. He and his bodyguard were slightly wounded. On July 1, four ANSF personnel were killed in Chahardara.

=== Operation Sahda Ehlm ===
On June 4, German forces including the quick reaction element of Regional Command North undertook another concentrated advance into rebellious Chardara district after a patrol had been ambushed close to a bordering wetlands. German troops encountered resistance and killed at least ten militants in heavy fighting. During the fighting, Master Sergeant Daniel Seibert, a squad leader with 2nd company, 212th mechanized infantry battalion and Master Sergeant Jan Hecht, a squad leader with 2nd Company, 391st Mechanized Infantry Battalion led a daunting counterattack to save the lives of a German recce party in distress and were later awarded Germany's highest military award. Later on, a German unit was ambushed at the same places as it tried to recover a vehicle disabled by hostile fire. Two Germans were wounded in the attack, while at least one attacker was killed and two were wounded. For having evacuated a critically wounded German while under hostile fire that day, Sergeant First Class Steffen Knoska, a squad leader with 2nd Company, 1st Air Assault Regiment would also be awarded for valor.

Prolonged fighting continued between the Taliban and various coalition forces. Two Afghan National Army soldiers were killed, and two Afghan soldiers and a Belgian soldier wounded in action. Four American soldiers were killed by a roadside bomb on June 7. A local Afghan official was murdered by the Taliban in Shir Khan on June 17.

Another heavy engagement took place on June 23 – this time only a few kilometres off the outskirts of Kunduz – when 2nd Company, 391st Mechanized Infantry Battalion and 1st Company, 263rd Airborne Battalion as well as Afghan troops clashed with insurgent forces. At least three Taliban were killed in action and three German soldiers were killed when their armored personnel carrier attempting to evade RPG fire slid down a bank, fell into an irrigation ditch and rolled over. Regular fighting and hostile attacks continued over the following days but resulted in few or no casualties among allied troops. PRT Kunduz and adjacent government facilities in Kunduz were now regularly attacked with mortars and unguided rockets. Potential disaster was only narrowly avoided when a 122 mm rocket hit the PRT's mess building, piercing a wall but failing to detonate.

=== Operation Oqab (Eagle) ===
"Thank God (...) the Marders came and suppressed the enemy."

- A German mechanized infantry soldier during the campaign's Operation Oqab, marking the first time ever the Marder IFV saw combat service.

July's joint Afghan-German efforts led to more fierce confrontations from July 18 onward. For the first time in the war, the Germans would deploy infantry fighting vehicles and artillery, killing a large number of insurgents on July 19; in addition to the heavy weaponry's first use in earnest, American A-10 Warthogs flew several close air support sorties. On one occasion a Belgian-mentored Afghan unit was trapped and had to be relieved by the German mechanized infantry; at least 16 Taliban were killed, 12 wounded and 14 captured. Fighting erupted once more on July 20 when two Afghan civilians, mistaken for hostile individuals, were also among the killed. The Taliban murdered approximately 20 civilians in two separate incidents as retaliation on July 22.

By the end of July, Chardara had almost been cleared of Taliban.

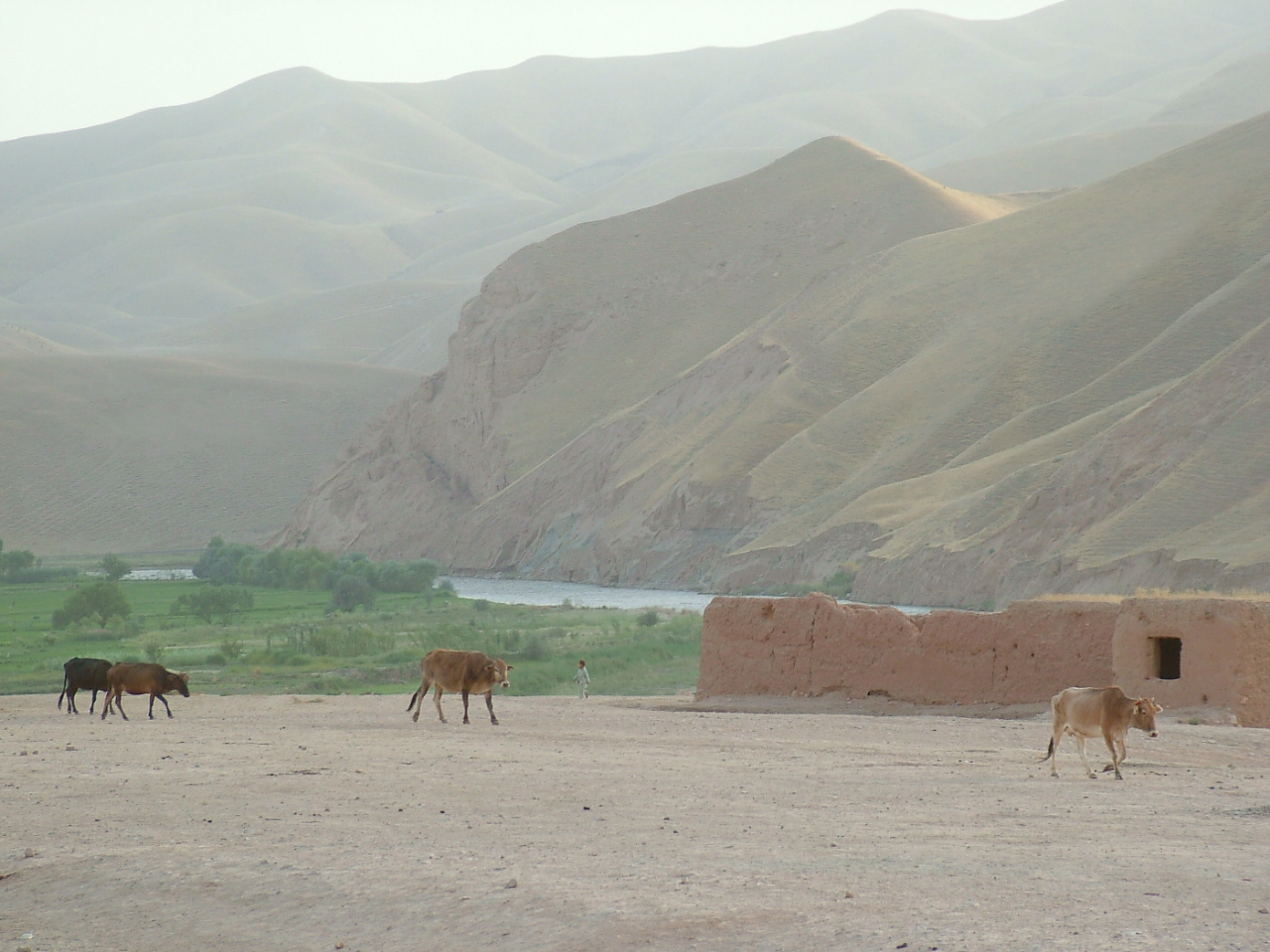
Surroundings of Kunduz where fierce fighting took place almost every day

The situation calmed down for about a week. Observers warned that the Taliban were not defeated and could return immediately to the disputed district, though. A rising number of hostile encounters in the first week of August confirmed their assumptions. One German soldier was shot in combat on August 7. Twelve insurgents and four Afghan security forces personnel were killed during a skirmish on August 12. Only 24 hours later, 20 insurgents were killed trying to assault a coalition outpost in Aliabad. The Taliban also began to attack supplies en route to the PRT on August 16, opening fire on a civilian-crewed fuel convoy. 2009's Presidential elections were expected to worsen the situation, however only a few attacks actually occurred while the turnout was in progress: Three police officers were killed and five kidnapped in Imam Sahib on August 19. Coalition forces killed 14 Taliban on August 26 and early August 27. Another seven Taliban and four foreign militants were killed by Afghan forces on August 28.

Heavy engagements lit up in the first week of September. A tactical victory was scored when German forces managed to rout a Taliban party from a battlefield in Imam Sahib. Eleven insurgents were killed and four wounded in action, but so were four Germans. Eight armoured fighting vehicles were lost to hostile fire.

=== Kunduz airstrike ===
On September 4, a devastating nighttime air raid struck a riverbank only 7 kilometres to the southwest of Kunduz. Taliban militants had hijacked civilian supply trucks with gasoline on a nearby road. After an attempt to bring the heavy vehicles across the Kunduz river had failed, the insurgents sent for nearby villagers to come and help unload the fuel. The German command center was aware of the incident, readied a quick reaction force and sent for close air support. Unbeknownst to them a considerable number of civilians had mixed with the insurgents and militant supporters in order to come by a free gallon of fuel. Fearing a truck bomb attack could be imminent if the trucks came unstuck, a German commander ordered a pair of American F-15s to attack the scene with bombs. A later German investigation concluded the attack caused up to 142 deaths, including an unknown number of civilians. The attack, though justified by several officials, caused considerable uproar in Germany and led to the resignation of senior officers and the Minister of Labour Franz-Josef Jung in October 2009. The German officers who orchestrated the bombing were later acquitted of all charges. German courts denied civilian casualties any form of compensation on the grounds that the involved military personnel were led to believe by a double agent among the insurgent party that no civilians were present at the scene.

Three German troopers were wounded in a vehicle-born suicide attack the following day. A further week-long series of engagements resulted in eight more German WIAs, among them the first female German soldier to be wounded in action. KSK operatives launched another successful raid in early October and captured 15 Taliban during a surprise attack. Three civilians were killed and 17 wounded during a Taliban attack on October 3. Six insurgents were detained by ISAF and ANSF forces on October 10 and more than 50 surrendered. One insurgent was killed when hostile forces attacked German soldiers during a humanitarian mission on October 20. A day later, two Taliban were killed and three ANSF officers wounded in Pul-e Alchhi. On November 2, seven insurgents were killed and eight arrested in an exchange of fire involving Afghan, German and Belgian troops.

=== Chardara battles of late 2009 ===
With the support of United States special forces and German troops, a third offensive was launched in the Gor Tepa region and spearheaded by Afghan forces on November 5. Heavy combat lasting until November 11 resulted in the deaths of 133 insurgents (including Qari Bashir Haqqani) and the capture of 25 others. One US soldier was killed and one Afghan and one German each wounded in action; furthermore a pair of German CH-53GS medium transport helicopters came under prolonged hostile fire and had to return to their base due to damages.

The year ended with almost daily hostile contacts for the German-American force. Civilians were caught in the crossfire once more as the Taliban attacked the Mischa Meier Bridge (named after a German soldier who was killed in action there) which extends across the Kunduz river to the southwest of the city. Five Taliban and three locals guarding the bridge were killed in action; other attacks on the same day resulted in the deaths of ten insurgents in Imam Sahib and Khanabad as well as in the capture of six others. An Afghan-German-American patrol killed five insurgents on the following day.

=== Intensifying warfare in 2010: Operation Gala-e Gorg (Wolf Pack) and the arrival of the 10th Mountain Division ===
In late December it was decided that Chardara would be lost to the insurgency once more if the coalition failed to maintain a permanent presence there as had been normal in other parts of the country, to the situation of which Chardara drew close. For this reason, a fourth and final offensive was launched on December 14, the first time ISAF's new counter insurgency strategy "clear – hold – build" should be put to test in Regional Command North's area of responsibilities. A joint force of 300 Afghan light infantry and police units and 300 German mechanized infantry was concentrated near Mischa Meier Bridge, their objective being to enter the rebellious district and set up a forward operating base there. This show of force was intended to win local support for the Afghan government.

Combat engineers along with troops of 4th Company, 391st Mechanized Infantry Battalion were attacked several times while rebuilding the partially destroyed bridge. Two Germans were wounded in action. Once the path into Chardara was secure, fierce fighting continued throughout the following days. A blow was dealt to the opposition forces by the killing of Taliban leader Mullah Ahsanullah on December 16.

In January 2010, the United States and Germany agreed to increase their efforts in Kunduz and Baghlan by raising troop and civilian numbers to 6,000. The US Army's elite 10th Mountain Division was deployed in early 2010 for a 14 month deployment. After the successful advance into Chardara in late December the next stage of the offensive was launched on January 28. 500 German soldiers from two infantry battalions and 120 Afghan troops advanced across country and set up numerous permanent checkpoints, road blocks and heavily fortified observation posts; by the end of January, the coalition's presence took on an air of permanence, with a strong forward operating base and a net of outposts. Trying to stop the Germans from further construction work, nine insurgents were killed in action.

A very serious situation unfolded during a firefight on February 5 when a routed group of Taliban in the process of being chased-down by German light infantry hid in a crowd of villagers, leading not only to their deaths but also to civilian casualties. Four days later an Afghan night patrol mistook a German patrol for opposing forces and opened fire. US special forces killed one insurgent and captured two more while searching for a Taliban commander in the far east of Afghanistan. On February 17, six insurgents were killed in clashes with German troops and 25 insurgents surrendered on February 22.

Several insurgents were eliminated during clashes in the first two weeks of March. Again, close air support and mortars were used. One German soldier was wounded in action on March 5. Two Swedish officers were killed in action. Engagements followed throughout the next weeks, and on March 24 a contracted helicopter carrying ISAF-troops was shot down by insurgents.

The largest battle yet since the fall of Kunduz to anti-Taliban forces in 2001 took place on April 2, the year's Good Friday, in the form of an attack by 200 insurgents. A platoon of 2nd Company, 373rd Airborne Battalion was caught in the open after a roadside bomb struck their patrol in the village of Isa Khel; simultaneously, the troops manning a nearby base situated in an Afghan police station came under fire as well. During nine hours of intense fighting, 20 soldiers out of the 36 strong German platoon trapped in Isa Khel were killed or wounded in action. Six Afghan troops were also killed by German friendly fire. Furthermore, coalition ground troops and responding US MEDEVAC helicopters belonging to the US Army's 158th Aviation Regiment sustained considerable combat damage in a hail of small arms fire. The American helicopters and the responding German forces saved the platoon from almost certain annihilation. The Battle of Isa Khel went down into German military history as the bloodiest engagement German troops have been involved in since the end of World War II. During the months to follow 21 soldiers were awarded for exceptional bravery. Three Germans were awarded with the nation's highest award for valor; 14 Americans were awarded with the second-highest award. News images of sandal-clad Taliban warriors rejoicing on the scarred wrecks of the most modern German military technology had a strong effect on the German public.

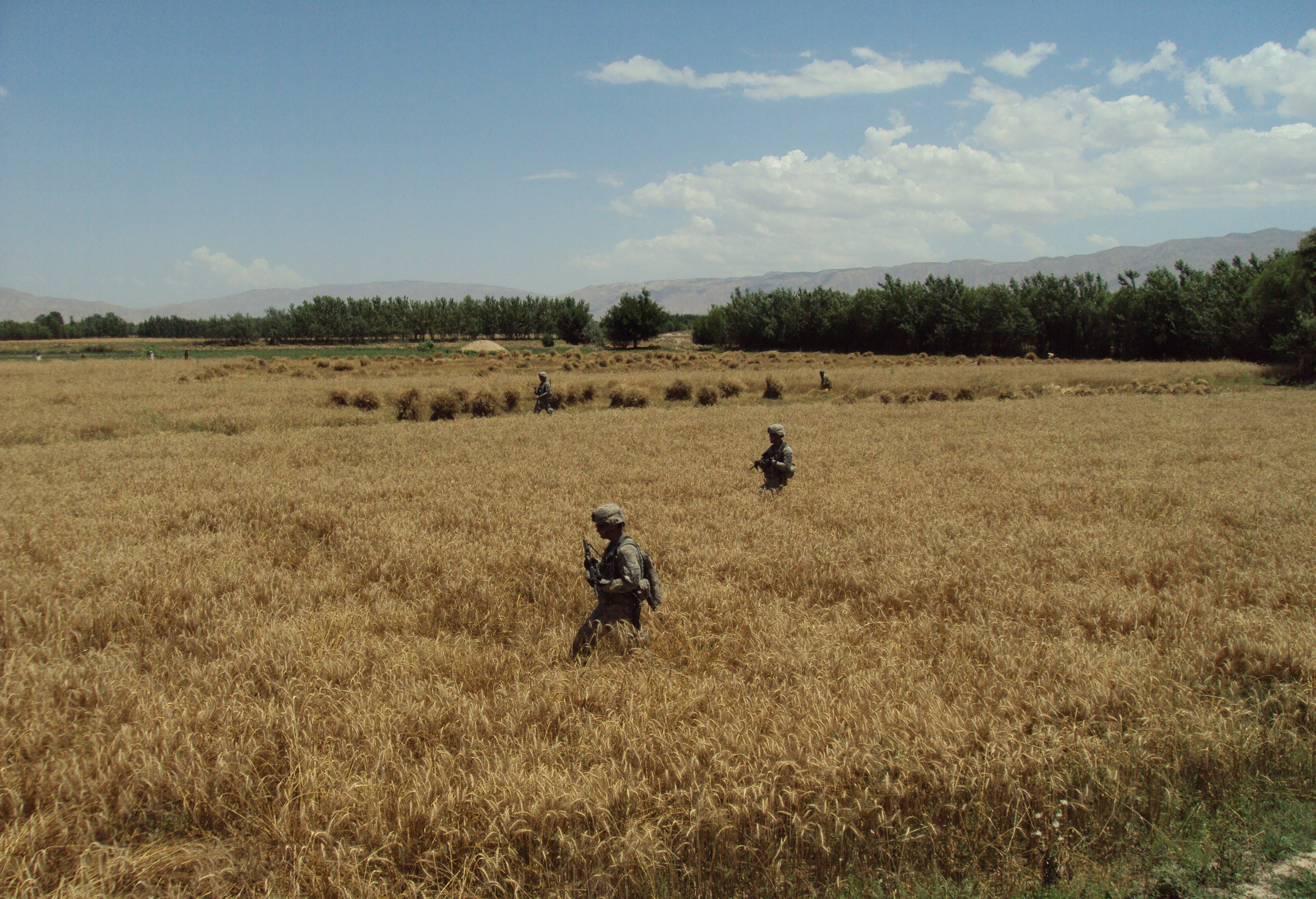
Blacksheep Company, 87th Infantry Regiment, 10th Mountain Division on patrol in Baghlan Province, Afghanistan

By early summer, the 10th Mountain Division had fully settled in and had an operationally high tempo of combat patrols. In Baghlan, 87th Infantry Regiment (United States), 10th Mountain Division Soldiers continued advancing on Taliban and Hezb-e Islami Gulbuddin forces. The following weeks saw daily clashes that killed two US Soldiers, with three others killed by a roadside bomb on June 16.

On June 27, four Norwegian troops were killed by a roadside bomb in the course of a series of operations aimed at increasing coalition and government presence in Ghowrmach, another hotspot in the northern allies' area of responsibility. The mission of the Norwegian forces was to provide mentoring and fire support for Afghan security forces which were initially poorly trained and lacked strength, equipment and leadership. The Norwegian forces killed 150 insurgents during the second half of the year, effectively putting a pressure upon insurgent militias in RC-North's comprehensive security approach to regain control over the entire north of Afghanistan.

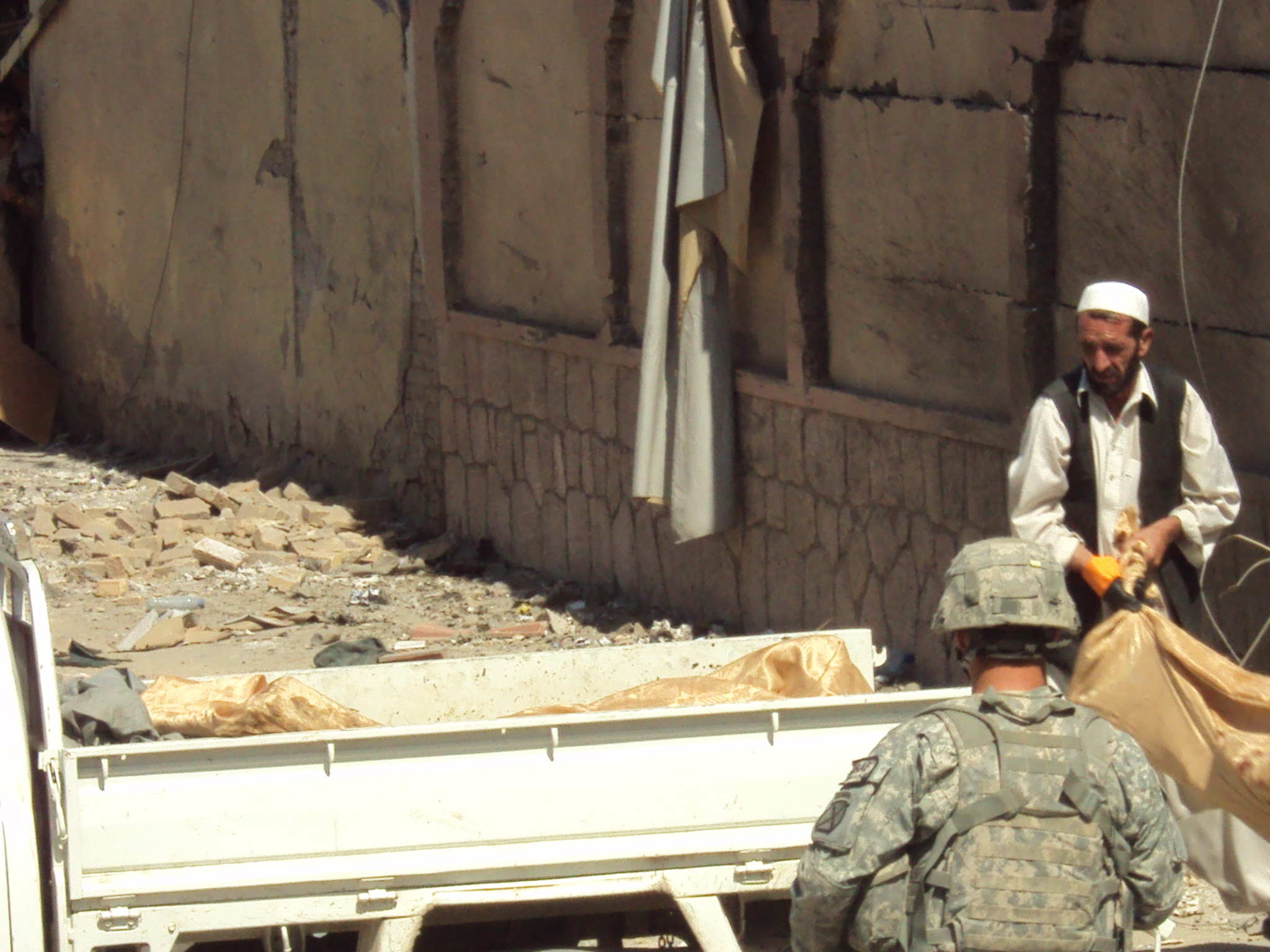
A 10th Mountain Soldier oversees the loading of bodies after a deadly attack on a USAID compound on 2 July 2010

On July 2, Taliban launched a coordinated suicide attack on a USAID compound in Kunduz. The Taliban claimed responsibility for the attack, which saw a suicide car bomb detonate in front of the multi-story building before five other attackers, armed with rifles, grenades, and wearing suicide vests, stormed inside. Four USAID security officers were killed, with an additional 23 people wounded. These wounded included responding Afghan police officers, other USAID personnel, and civilians. The battle raged for hours before nearby Blacksheep Company, 87th Infantry Regiment, 10th Mountain Division Soldiers responded, eliminating the rest of the fighters and securing the building.

In August, combat operations by the US Army intensified in Kunduz and Baghlan provinces. The 10th Mountain Division, along with various Special Operations Forces, conducted daily patrols and direct action missions. On August 4, Master Sergeant Jared N. Van Aalst was shot and killed during a raid in Kunduz. He was part of the US Army's Delta Force.

=== Operations Taohid I, II & III (Unity) ===
While coalition forces were gaining the upper hand in Kunduz and in Faryab, their commanders feared the recent victories were all but in vain if the insurgent presence in the adjacent Baghlan province was left to act at will. Later that month, a multi-national force launched a series of Operations dubbed Operation Taohid in order to drive insurgents out of the so-called Pashtun Corridor. On April 11, 2010, one American who was part of the Hungary-United States Operational Mentor and Liaison Team 9.3 was wounded in combat by an RPG while returning fire from his fighting position. Also one Afghan police officer was wounded in the back blast of an RPG being fired back at the Taliban. On April 15, four Germans were killed in action and five wounded when their armoured vehicle was hit by RPG fire during an ambush. At least 20 Taliban were also killed. Another 21 militants died in early May and 27 were captured. It was the first time that the Afghan military made use of their own aerial assets, raising hopes about the survivability of the local security forces. A sweep through Dahana-e-Ghuri District immediately afterwards was supposed to prevent remaining insurgents from hiding in neighboring provinces. At least nine Taliban were killed and 11 wounded. In late April two Americans were wounded in action by small arms, while retaking a captured police station on Main Supply Route Uranus.

The third phase of concerted operations in Baghlan-i Jadid began in late June. It was planned to build a set of combat outposts and increase coalition presence in areas until then held by armed militants. International troops were also able to distribute humanitarian aid to the population of these areas. Several hostile encounters occurred during the following weeks. However, allied forces were not able to maintain permanent security along the line of communications between Kunduz and Pol-e Khomri initially. Two Hungarian and a US soldier were killed in several incidents.

Throughout the summer of 2010, Blacksheep Company, 87th Infantry Regiment, conducted numerous raids on High-value targets (HVT) throughout Baghlan Province, which resulted in several Taliban leaders captured and killed. Many of these operations were Long-range reconnaissance patrols (LRRP) which led to numerous engagements. On one LRRP, Second Platoon was reconnoitering a village within Dahana-e-Ghuri when they confirmed the presence of a HVT, Abdul Jamil, the senior leader of that district. An airstrike was authorized and Jamil, along with the Juma Din, the Baghlan-e Markazi district leader, and 15 other fighters were killed.

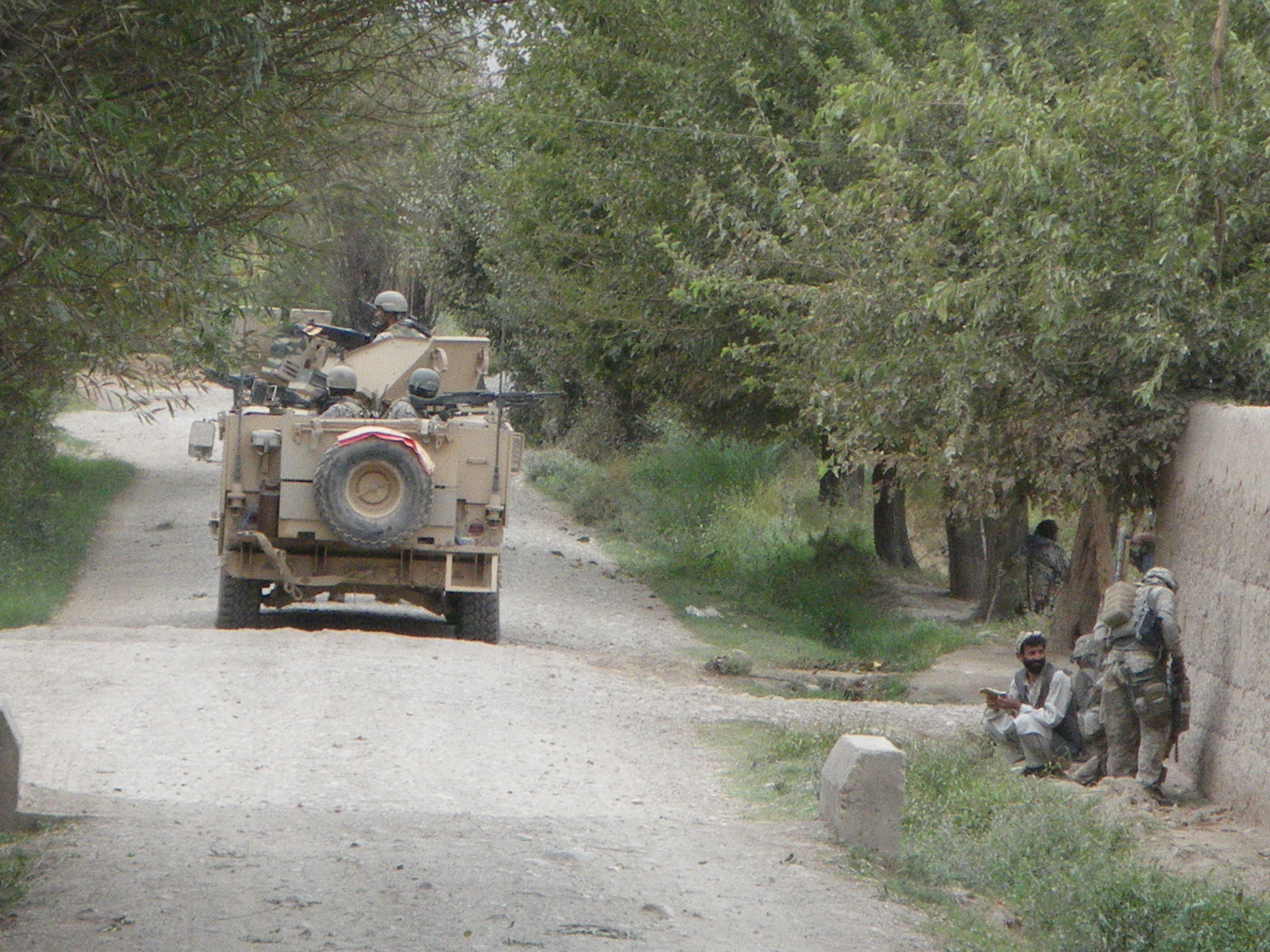
Members of Blacksheep Company during the Battle of Shahabuddin

The international forces undertook another advance into the disputed area, the so-called "Highway Triangle" or "Golden Triangle" to the north of Pol-e Khomri between September and October 2010. The battle for Highway Triangle lasted for multiple weeks and included a large mechanized force as well as close air support. The liberated area around Shahabuddin and Aka-Khel was supposed to be secured by local pro-government militias. Their outpost was overrun and taken by the Taliban, decimating the Afghan Peace & Reintegration Program troops that manned the outpost. Second Platoon, Blacksheep Company, from the US Army's 87th Infantry Regiment of the 10th Mountain Division, led an operation, along with a US Army ODA team from 7th Special Forces Group (United States), and German TF Kunduz, to assault the outpost and retake it in close combat. Three intense days of fighting, later named the Battle of Shahabuddin, became the largest battle of the German Army since WW2. An estimated 300 enemy fighters fiercely engaged the American led operation in the heaviest fighting of all of RC-North during the war. Multiple American, German, and Afghan soldiers were wounded, with over two dozen Afghan soldiers and police being killed in action. A German Marder IFV was disabled by recoilless rifle fire on the second day of the battle, which resulted in several Germand wounded in action.

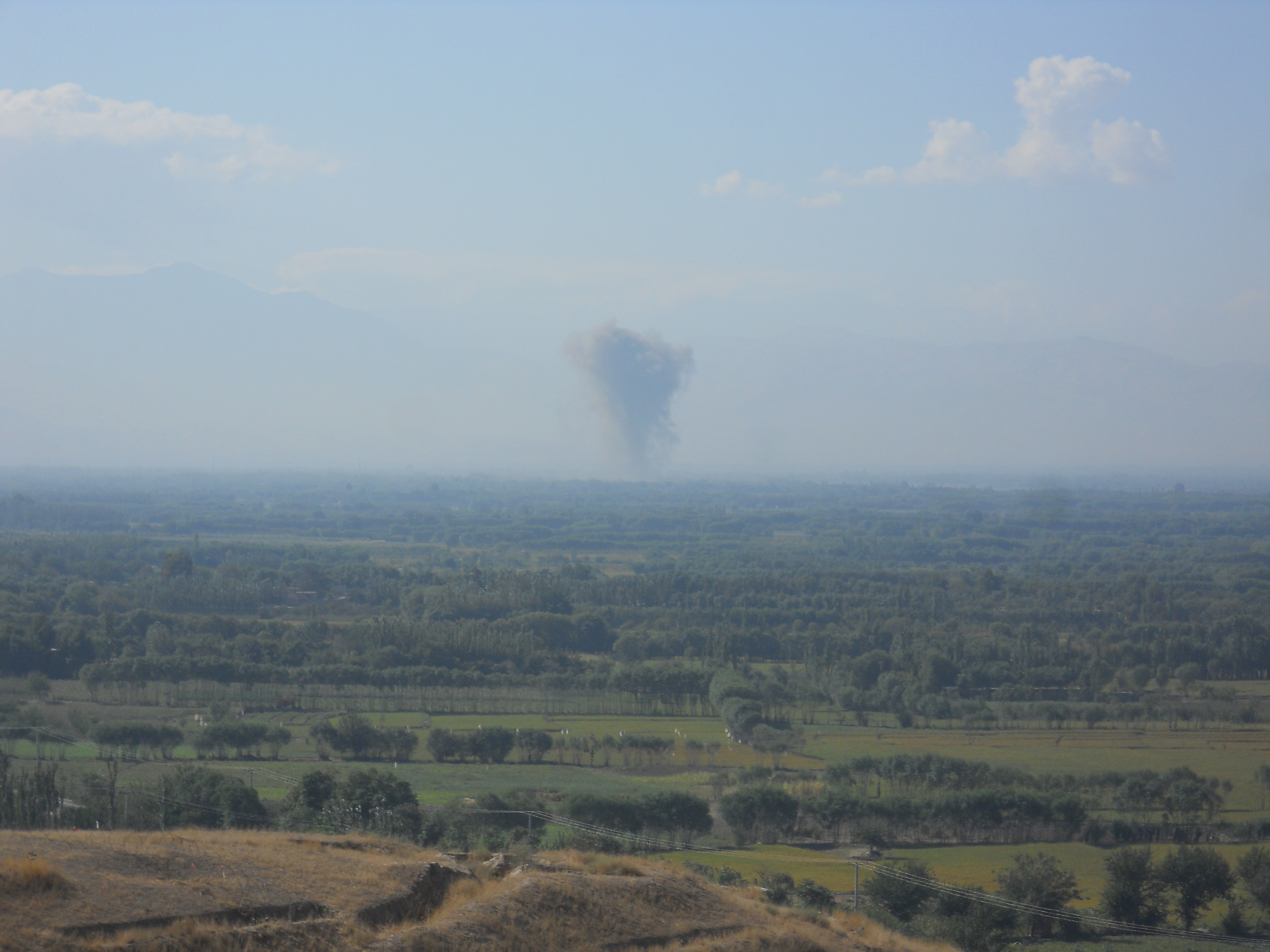
A B-1 drops a 2000lb JDAM for 10th Mountain Soldiers battling entrenched Taliban during the Battle of Shahabuddin

Estimates of 100+ enemy fighters were killed. For the first time in RC-North, Afghan National Army artillery was used to counter Taliban mortars during the battle. Additionally, American Air Force Rockwell B-1 Lancers dropped over a dozen bombs, as well as fire support from A-10s and AH-64s. The battle ended once coalition forces retook the Combat Outpost on the third day. All 26 APRP members that had been at the COP had been overrun and killed.

Following the Battle of Shahabuddin, Blacksheep company and the ODA team permanently moved into the old COP, rotating platoons on a weekly basis. Blood stains and damaged HESCO barriers from where the APRP platoon had been overrun and killed still remained. In mid-October, the Taliban launched a massive counter-attack, attempting to retake the COP. Second Platoon was on rotation at the time and defended the COP during a six-hour firefight. At least 75 enemy fighters were killed, including by the detonation of several claymores.

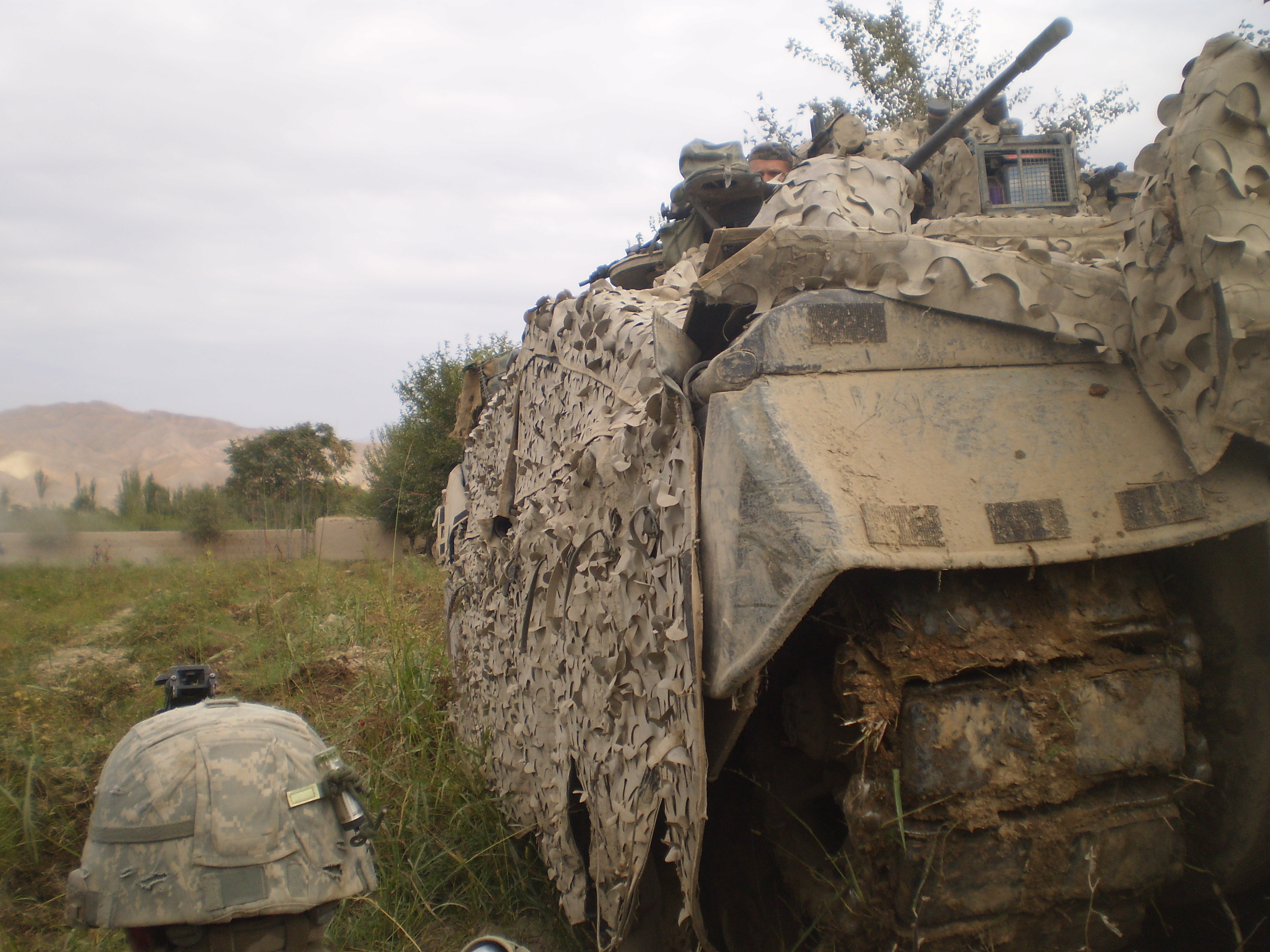
A US Army 10th Mountain Soldier next to a German Marder tank during intense fighting in Shahabuddin, Baghlan Province, Afghanistan

Coalition forces used their gains to maintain a presence in Shahabuddin until the end of combat operations in Afghanistan in 2014. On October 7, 2010, one German soldier was killed and 14 wounded in a series of attacks; it was also in this outpost on February 18, 2011, that a Taliban sleeper in an Afghan uniform turned against German troops, killing three and wounding six. Only a day afterwards the Taliban scored a major propagandistic victory by killing Mohammed Omar, governor of Kunduz province and the foreign forces main – albeit unreliable – ally in the north.

At the same time the Battle of Shahabuddin was ending in Baghlan, a US Army Delta Force raid was conducted just north in Konduz. During the nighttime raid on 18 September 2010, SFC Aaron Grider was killed by enemy machine gun fire, with several other Delta operators wounded.

=== Operation Halmazag (Lightning) ===
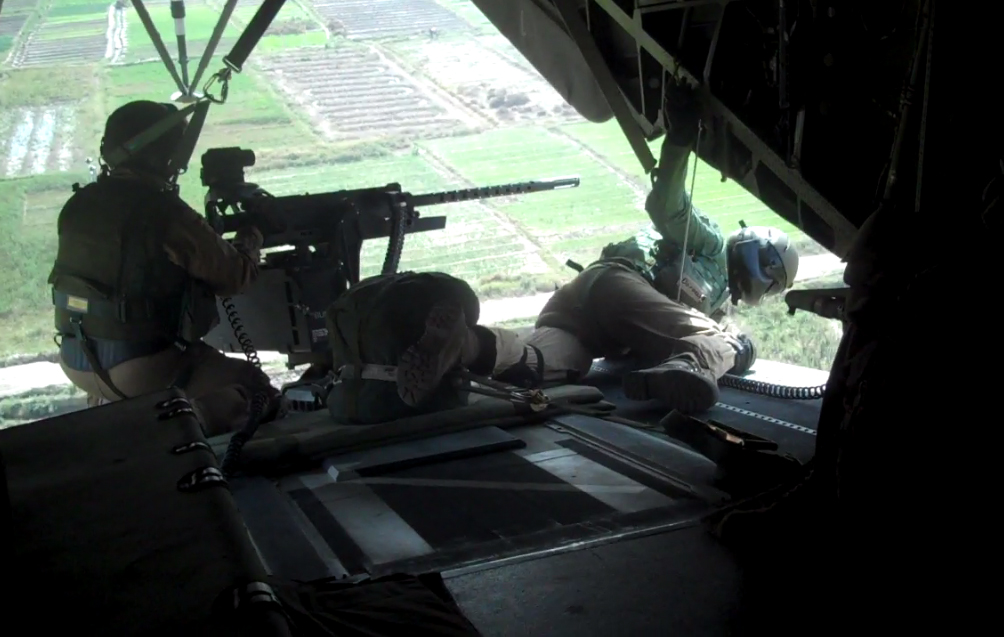
German Army CH-53G carrying a platoon of Blacksheep Company, 87th Infantry Regiment, 10th Mountain Division Soldiers prepares to land during an air assault operation in Baghlan Province, Afghanistan

From late October to mid-November 2010, German troops, with the support of American, Afghan and Belgian forces led Operation Halmazag, an offensive to establish a permanent ISAF presence around the village of Isa Khel and Quatliam, just 6 miles west of the main Coalition compound at Kunduz. Assisted by American close air support and suppressive fire from their PzH2000s, approximately 300 German paratroopers and further Afghan forces drove off the Taliban from the area on November 4, and had consolidated a credible coalition presence around Quatliam and Isa Khel by November 15. At least eight insurgents were killed in battle with the Germans and dozens captured while coalition forces sustained only minor wounds. Simultaneously, air assault operations led by the 10th Mountain Division just south in Baghlan ramped up, with significant action occurring within the Highway Triangle.

In late 2010, the 10th Mountain executed a precision air assault raid to kill or capture two HVTs, the Taliban Shadow Governor of Konduz, Mullah Salam, as well as his top deputy, Mullah Miraj. This air assault operation was the result of months of intelligence gathering by coalition forces. The raid resulted in the capture of Miraj, along with his security team, and the deaths of several enemy fighters. While the raid was successful, Salam was not present. After the raid, he fled to Pakistan, where he was eventually captured by the Pakistani military. He was imprisoned for several years until being released in 2016, when he was killed in a US airstrike.

== Post-Halmazag ==
In late 2010 it became soon clear that the coalition would end its offensive activities in Afghanistan no later than by the last quarter 2014. With five infantry battalions now at its disposal, RC-North proceeded to secure the gains scored thus far. Fierce fighting – though less frequent in total due to the now-strong coalition presence – continued throughout 2011, with the Taliban's focus of operations shifting towards Baghlan Province for a time until it came to a near-halt in late 2011. While this was regarded by some observers as a clear indication of the German and American success in the region, the insurgents continued to show their strength from time to time; perhaps their worst blow dealt to the Germans took place on May 28, 2011, when Major General Markus Kneip, NATO's highest-ranking officer in the northern part of Afghanistan, was seriously wounded in an attack. Two soldiers of Kneip's entourage and several Afghans were also killed that day. Kneip is the highest ranking WIA of the Afghanistan War.

A major operation into Dahana-e-Ghuri began in early December 2010 to eliminate the final Taliban stronghold in Baghlan. Lasting a month until early January, Blacksheep Company of the 10th Mountain led the operation, with the German Army's TF Kunduz, a KSK element, a Hungarian PRT, and an Afghan National Army battalion moved into the valley. Immediately, they were engaged by Taliban forces. Progress was slow, with IEDs dotting the single dirt road. Contact was daily, with the coalition force sustaining multiple casualties during the intense fighting. At the end of the operation in early January 2011, a Combat Outpost was established deep within the valley and the Taliban forces routed.

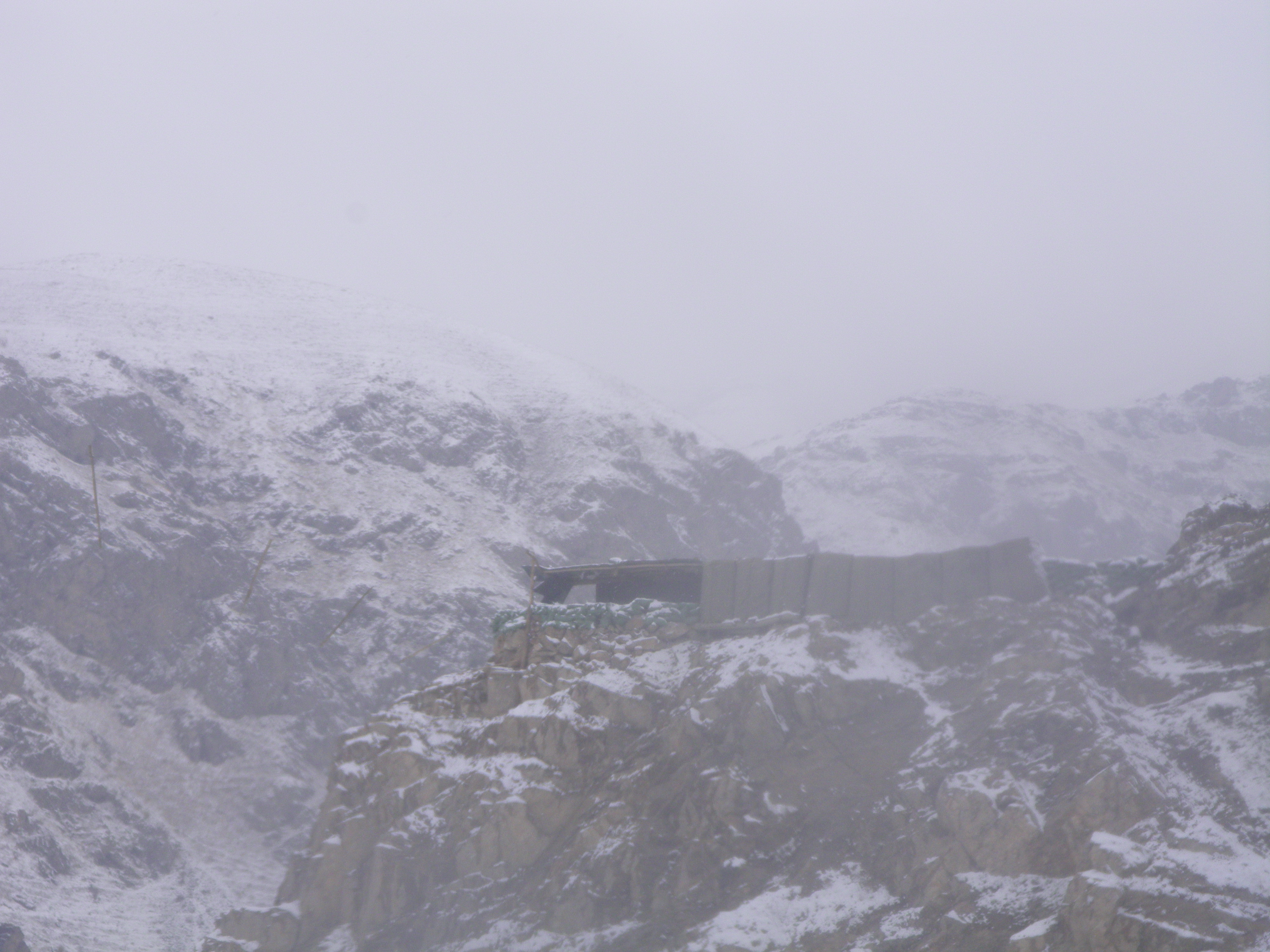
Blacksheep Company, 87th Infantry Regiment, 10th Mountain Division established numerous mountainous COPs to repel insurgent activity in the region.

As with much of the country, early 2011 saw a reduction in kinetic action due to the harsh winters of the Hindu Kush mountains in the northeast. At higher elevations with heavy snowfall, it made traditional movement by Taliban and HIG forces difficult. Nevertheless, attacks in Baghlan did continue, including an American Soldier killed by RPG fire on January 20th. Blacksheep Company established a series of mountainous Combat Outposts during the winter, with the intent of cutting off insurgent movement when the snow melted in the spring and the "fighting season" picked up.

The heaviest roadside bombing ever recorded in RC-North struck a German combat patrol on June 2. The approximately quarter ton explosive device tore apart a Marder infantry fighting vehicle, killing one soldier and critically wounding five. This was the only complete loss of a Marder to hostile activity.

Soon afterwards the last officially recognized full-scale Taliban assault on German forces took place at Shahabuddin. An insurgent force tried to take the German outpost there by surprise but was fought off with considerable losses not least due to the defending 231st Mountain Infantry Battalion's commander, Lieutenant colonel Jared Sembritzki. He was awarded with the Bundeswehr Cross of Honour for Valour on September 6.

A member of the German special forces (KSK) was killed in action and another wounded on June 6, 2013, the first combat losses in that unit's history. The Afghan unit meant to operate alongside the Germans fled combat twice, raising serious concerns about the ability of the Afghans to stand their ground on their own.

== Résumé ==
Regional Command North was redesignated as TAAC North on July 1, 2014. The German forces had to retreat to the training of Afghan troops and self-defense duties – with the Taliban set to retake Kunduz and undo the joint forces previous successes.

Indeed, the 2009–2011 period marked a U-turn in the rather pacifist military policy of Germany and also represented a crucial test for allied cooperation. The intensity of the fighting sparked a public debate in Germany whether German troops should even participate in a war. The only considerable support for the troops appeared in the form of a 2008 petition to restore a military award entirely reserved for valor; 22 soldiers were awarded with this Conspicuous Gallantry Cross. However, overall support for the military operation plunged down to an all-time low following the deadly September 2009 air strike, prompting observers to believe that ongoing combat operations would affect the general elections in 2009 and 2013 respectively (the only party to explicitly speak out against the war, Die Linke, failed to make noteworthy gains in these elections, though). Others regarded the unexpected move as a reaction to sharp criticism Germany long faced for opting out a more offensive role in the Afghanistan war.

== See also ==
- War in Afghanistan (2001–2021)
- International Security Assistance Force
- German Armed Forces casualties in Afghanistan
- Operation Harekate Yolo
- Operation Karez
- Operation Oqab
