= Bundeswehr Cross of Honour for Valour =

Bundeswehr Cross of Honour for Valour Ehrenkreuz der Bundeswehr für Tapferkeit
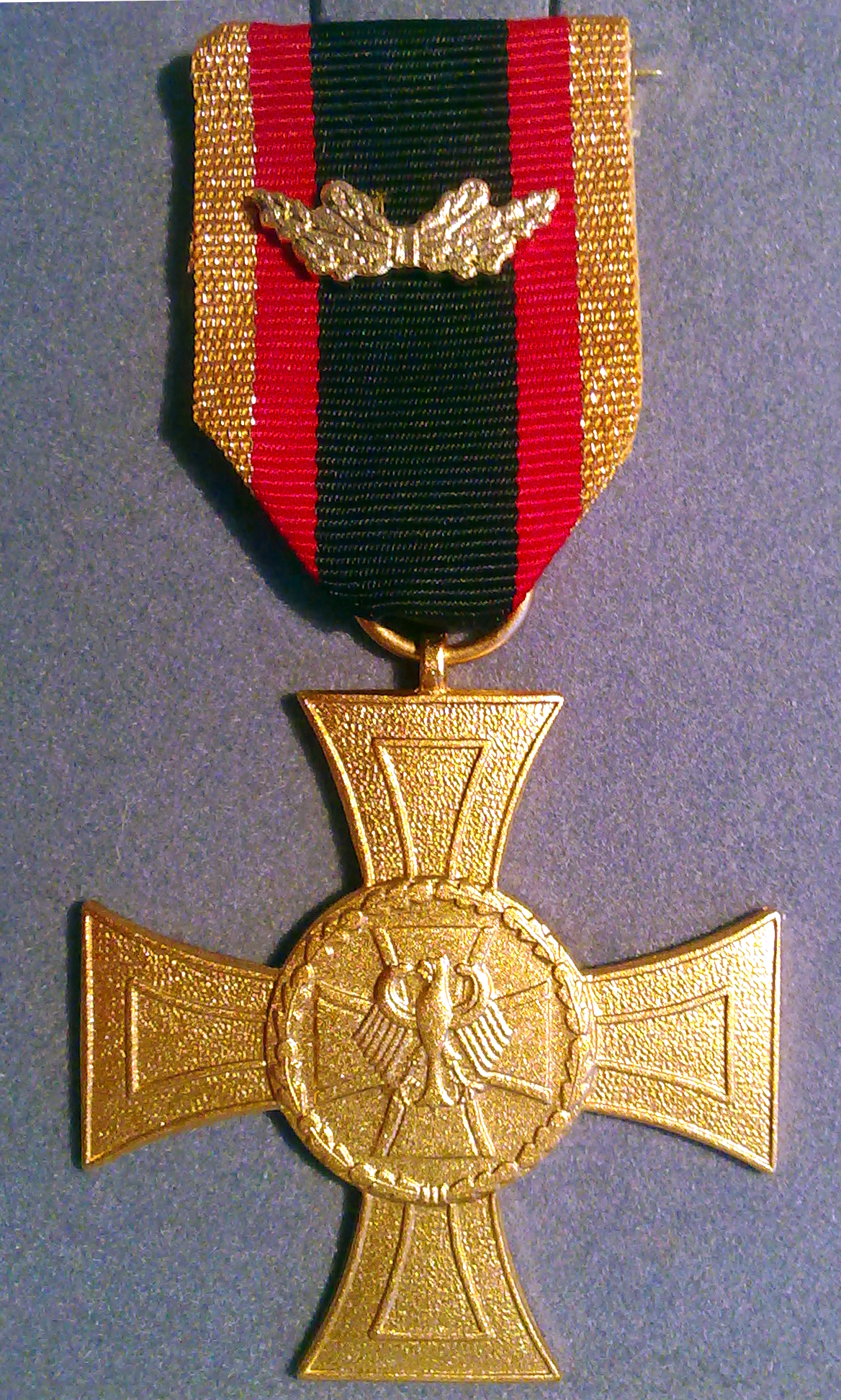
- The Bundeswehr Cross of Honour for Valour
- Type: Military decoration
- Awarded for: "An act of gallantry in the face of exceptional danger to life and limb whilst demonstrating staying power and serenity in order to fulfill the military mission in an ethically sound way."
- Country: Germany
- Presented by: Bundeswehr
- Status: Currently awarded
- Established: 13 August 2008
- First award: 1 July 2009
- Ribbon bar of the decoration

The Bundeswehr Cross of Honour for Valour (German: Ehrenkreuz der Bundeswehr für Tapferkeit) is the highest military decoration of the Bundeswehr. It is the highest class of the Bundeswehr Cross of Honour. The decoration is the first combat valour award presented by Germany since World War II.

== History ==
Since World War II, Germany has seen its military as a defensive force, but during the 1990s Germany began playing a bigger role with its military within the European Union. After the September 11 attacks on the United States, Germany joined ISAF in Afghanistan and has continued to deploy Bundeswehr troops to areas under combat conditions.

In 2007, the Petitions Committee of the Bundestag made a recommendation to create a decoration to recognize military personnel for valour. In 2008, Ernst-Reinhard Beck, the president of the German Reservists Association, suggested the reestablishment of the Iron Cross. From its establishment by the Kingdom of Prussia in 1813 until 1945, the Iron Cross had recognized valour by German soldiers. However, the historical connotations assigned to the Iron Cross from World War II provoked criticism from some groups. Federal Defence Minister Franz Josef Jung proposed a new level of the Bundeswehr Cross of Honour to recognize bravery and valour in combat on 13 August 2008. The President of Germany Horst Köhler granted authorization for this valour decoration on 18 September 2008. On 10 October 2008, the directive creating the Bundeswehr Cross of Honour for Valour became law upon being published in the Federal Law Gazette and the Federal Gazette.

The first recipients of the Cross of Honour for Valour were four soldiers caught up in a suicide attack by Taliban forces on 20 October 2008 southwest of Kunduz, Afghanistan. Two German soldiers were wounded and two were killed in the attack. Five Afghan children died, while one was injured. Disregarding the fact that their armored vehicle was on fire and munitions were exploding around them, these four soldiers rushed to the scene to try to help the wounded without regard for their own safety.

== Criteria ==
Members of the German Armed forces are statutorily, under Section 7 of the Legal Status of Military Personnel Act, required to be brave. Members swear to "bravely defend the rights and freedom of the German people." For this reason any conduct recognized by the Cross of Honour for Valour must be of an exceptionally brave nature. Recommendations must describe in great detail how this bravery is above that which is required and how it was "necessary to overcome fear and perform an act of gallantry in the face of exceptional danger to life and limb whilst demonstrating staying power and serenity in order to fulfill the military mission in an ethically sound way."

== Recipients ==
| Date of award | Name | Age | Rank when awarded | Unit at ceremony | Operation | Reason awarded | Source |
|---|---|---|---|---|---|---|---|
| 6 July 2009 | Jan Berges | 29 | Hauptfeldwebel (HptFw) | 1./Fallschirmjägerbataillon 263 | ISAF | On 20 October 2008, about five kilometers southwest of Kunduz, Afghanistan, they rescued their comrades and Afghan civilians who were victims of a suicide attack. In spite of burning vehicles and exploding ammunition these soldiers rushed to aid the victims of the attack. | |
| 6 July 2009 | Alexander Dietzen | 33 | HptFw | 1./Fallschirmjägerbataillon 263 | ISAF | On 20 October 2008, about five kilometers southwest of Kunduz, Afghanistan, they rescued their comrades and Afghan civilians who were victims of a suicide attack. In spite of burning vehicles and exploding ammunition these soldiers rushed to aid the victims of the attack. | |
| 6 July 2009 | Henry Lukács | 28 | HptFw | 1./Fallschirmjägerbataillon 263 | ISAF | On 20 October 2008, about five kilometers southwest of Kunduz, Afghanistan, they rescued their comrades and Afghan civilians who were victims of a suicide attack. In spite of burning vehicles and exploding ammunition these soldiers rushed to aid the victims of the attack. | |
| 6 July 2009 | Markus Geist | 28 | Oberfeldwebel (OFw) | Luftlande-/Lufttransportschule | ISAF | On 20 October 2008, about five kilometers southwest of Kunduz, Afghanistan, they rescued their comrades and Afghan civilians who were victims of a suicide attack. In spite of burning vehicles and exploding ammunition these soldiers rushed to aid the victims of the attack. | |
| 22 January 2010 | Daniel Seibert | 30 | HptFw | Gefechtsübungszentrum Heer | ISAF | On 4 June 2009, he led a reconnaissance patrol outside of Kunduz, Afghanistan. While on patrol they became engaged with a numerically superior enemy force. In the course of more than one-hour firefight, the attackers were repelled. | |
| 22 January 2010 | Steffen Knoska | 29 | OFw | Jägerregiment 1 | ISAF | On 7 June 2009, operating in the Kunduz area, and while trying to salvage a damaged vehicle during a battle, under heavy fire. Risking his own life and in spite of a helmet hit, along with his soldiers he rescued a wounded comrade from the field of fire. | |
| 4 May 2010 | Jan Hecht | 36 | HptFw | 2./Panzergrenadierbataillon 391 | ISAF | On 4 June 2009, HptFw Hecht and his platoon received the order to reinforce a patrol which had come under fire. During the approach, the platoon itself was ambushed near Basoz (Kunduz area). Facing utmost personal danger and displaying outstanding leadership, Hecht led his outnumbered platoon into combat, managed to break through and relieved the cut-off patrol. | |
| 29 November 2010 | Mario Kunert | 36 | HptFw | 3./Fallschirmjägerbataillon 373 | ISAF | On 2 April 2010 in Isa Khel (Kunduz Area), HptFw Kunert pressed forward with four soldiers to a patrol which has been ambushed and cut off. By his vigorous advance and his firm leadership, Kunert enabled the extrication of the wounded patrol commander. | |
| 29 November 2010 | Philipp Oliver Pordzik | 33 | HptFw | 4./Fallschirmjägerbataillon 313 | ISAF | On 2 April 2010 in Isa Khel (Kunduz Area), HptFw Pordzik rushed his platoon to the site where an APC Dingo had been destroyed by a remotely detonated IED. Facing mortal danger by intense and aimed enemy fire, Pordzik dismounted and enabled the rescue of the wounded Dingo-crew by purposeful leadership and resolute action. | |
| 29 November 2010 | Ralf Rönckendorf | 38 | HptFw | 3./Fallschirmjägerbataillon 373 | ISAF | On 2 April 2010 during an intense firefight in Isa Khel (Kunduz Area), OFw Rönckendorf, weapon in hand, fought his way through to and treated one of his comrades who was wounded and threatened to be overwhelmed by insurgents. Finally Rönckendorf himself was severely wounded by an IED-detonation, causing him to lose his eyesight. | |
| 29 November 2010 | Maik Mutschke | 24/25 | Stabsgefreiter (StGefr) | 3./Fallschirmjägerbataillon 373 | ISAF | On 2 April 2010 in Isa Khel (Kunduz Area), StGefr Mutschkes patrol was attacked and surrounded by insurgents, wounding the patrol leader. In the ensuing heavy engagement, Mutsche -alone and under constant enemy fire- crossed 300m of the village and made contact with friendly troops, enabling them to press up to his patrol. | |
| 29 November 2010 | Robert Hartert (posthumous - killed 2 April 2010) | 25 (†) | StGefr | 3./Fallschirmjägerbataillon 373 | ISAF | On 2 April 2010 in an intense engagement in Isa Khel (Kunduz Area), StGefr Hartert fought with conspicuous gallantry as a machinegunner in a forwardmost position and was eventually fatally wounded. Until this moment, his autonomous and continuous fire-support contributed immensely to the rescue of a wounded comrade from a dire situation. | |
| 29 November 2010 | Martin Kadir Augustyniak (posthumous - killed 2 April 2010) | 28 (†) | Hauptgefreiter (HptGefr) | 3./Fallschirmjägerbataillon 373 | ISAF | On 2 April 2010 in an intense engagement in Isa Khel (Kunduz Area), HptGefr Augustyniak took an essential role in the rescue of a wounded patrol leader. Despite being wounded twice during the heavy engagement, Augustyniak eventually provided covering fire by making use of his rifle and RPG for an APC Dingo which had its machinegun destroyed. Finally he was fatally wounded when the mentioned APC was destroyed by a remotely detonated IED. | |
| 12 April 2011 | Stefan Weinmüller | 42 | Stabsfeldwebel (StFw) | Luftlande-/Lufttransportschule | ISAF | On 19 July 2009 StFw Weinmüller und OFw Henken rescued a wounded ANA-Soldier during an engagement near Isa Khan / Chahar Darah, facing enemy fire. HptFw Mey, OFw Reichow and StGefr Müller distinguished themselves on 16 June 2010 as members of Quick Reaction Force 5 during an engagement in the Baghlan area. During the awarding-ceremony, minister of defence Thomas de Maizière mentioned that the soldiers "made themselves conspiciuous by their gallant conduct“. | |
| 12 April 2011 | Timo Henken | 31 | OFw | Luftlande-/Lufttransportschule | ISAF | On 19 July 2009 StFw Weinmüller und OFw Henken rescued a wounded ANA-Soldier during an engagement near Isa Khan / Chahar Darah, facing enemy fire. HptFw Mey, OFw Reichow and StGefr Müller distinguished themselves on 16 June 2010 as members of Quick Reaction Force 5 during an engagement in the Baghlan area. During the awarding-ceremony, minister of defence Thomas de Maizière mentioned that the soldiers "made themselves conspiciuous by their gallant conduct“. | |
| 12 April 2011 | Andreas Mey | 30 | HptFw | 4./Gebirgsjägerbataillon 231 | ISAF | On 19 July 2009 StFw Weinmüller und OFw Henken rescued a wounded ANA-Soldier during an engagement near Isa Khan / Chahar Darah, facing enemy fire. HptFw Mey, OFw Reichow and StGefr Müller distinguished themselves on 16 June 2010 as members of Quick Reaction Force 5 during an engagement in the Baghlan area. During the awarding-ceremony, minister of defence Thomas de Maizière mentioned that the soldiers "made themselves conspiciuous by their gallant conduct“. | |
| 12 April 2011 | Norman Reichow | 30 | OFw | 4./Gebirgsjägerbataillon 231 | ISAF | On 19 July 2009 StFw Weinmüller und OFw Henken rescued a wounded ANA-Soldier during an engagement near Isa Khan / Chahar Darah, facing enemy fire. HptFw Mey, OFw Reichow and StGefr Müller distinguished themselves on 16 June 2010 as members of Quick Reaction Force 5 during an engagement in the Baghlan area. During the awarding-ceremony, minister of defence Thomas de Maizière mentioned that the soldiers "made themselves conspiciuous by their gallant conduct“. | |
| 12 April 2011 | Valeri Müller | 21 | StGefr | 4./Gebirgsjägerbataillon 231 | ISAF | On 19 July 2009 StFw Weinmüller und OFw Henken rescued a wounded ANA-Soldier during an engagement near Isa Khan / Chahar Darah, facing enemy fire. HptFw Mey, OFw Reichow and StGefr Müller distinguished themselves on 16 June 2010 as members of Quick Reaction Force 5 during an engagement in the Baghlan area. During the awarding-ceremony, minister of defence Thomas de Maizière mentioned that the soldiers "made themselves conspiciuous by their gallant conduct“. | |
| 6 September 2011 | Jared Sembritzki | 42 | Oberstleutnant | Kdr Gebirgsjägerbataillon 231 | ISAF | During a heavy engagement for a combat-outpost near Shahabuddin, OTL Sembritzki as commander of the Quick Reaction Force 5, distinguished himself by showing bravery, leadership, resolution and selfless commitment. | |
| 6 September 2011, two more awards were presented | ? | ? | ? | ? | ? | ? | ? |
| 6 September 2011, two more awards were presented | ? | ? | ? | ? | ? | ? | ? |
| 22 November 2011 | Rene Fandrich | ? | HptFw | Gefechtsübungszentrum Heer | ? | ? | |
| 22 November 2011 | Jürgen Wölfl | 42 | HptFw | 3./Panzergrenadierbataillon 122 | ? | ? | |
| 22 November 2011 | Jan Bauer | ? | OStGefr | 2./Fallschirmjägerbataillon 313 | ? | ? | |
| 22 November 2011 | Tim Focken | 24/25 | OStGefr | 2./Fallschirmjägerbataillon 313 | ? | ? | |
| 22 November 2011 | Engin Imprammpasi | ? | StGefr | ? | ? | ? | |
| 31 March 2014 | Benjamin B. | | HptFw | Kommando Spezialkräfte | ISAF | | |
| 31 March 2014 | Jürgen E. | | HptFw | Kommando Spezialkräfte | ISAF | | |
