= Paratrooper Battalion 263 (Bundeswehr) =

Coordinates: 49°15′38″N 7°23′08″E

- Insignia of the Paratrooper Battalion 263
- Active: 1982– 2015
- Country: Germany
- Branch: German Army
- Type: Airborne
- Size: About 1,000 troops
- Part of: Airborne Brigade 26, Special Operations Division
- Garrison/HQ: Zweibrücken, Germany
- Mottos: Fortis et Fidus (Strong and loyal)
- Anniversaries: April 1
- Engagements: Somalian Civil War Bosnian Civil War; Kosovo War; Afghanistan War: Operation Harekate Yolo I; Operation Oqab; Congolese Civil War
- Decorations: 4 recipients of the Honour Cross for Bravery serve with Paratrooper Battalion 263

Commanders
- Current commander: Lieutenant Colonel Andreas Steinhaus

The Paratrooper Battalion 263 (Fallschirmjägerbataillon 263) was one of the three combat battalions of the German Army's Airborne Brigade 26, which is a part of the Special Operations Division. Paratrooper Battalion 263 was fully airmobile and could act both as air assault infantry or could be dropped by parachute into the area of operations.

== History ==
The battalion was activated as the third combat battalion of Airborne Brigade 26 on April 1, 1982. Since 1985, the headquarters of the battalion have been hosted in Zweibrücken. The unit temporarily belonged to the multiliteral AMF(L) Brigade. It has taken part in overseas operations since 1993 when large parts of the battalion deployed to Somalia. Since then, Paratrooper Battalion 263 has taken part in numerous operations all over the globe and spent much time in northern Afghanistan, as part of the Kunduz Province Campaign, battling the resurgent Taliban insurgency. In 2006, the battalion attracted attention when some of its infantrymen were involved in the desecration of an Afghan cemetery. Nonetheless, with four of the nation's highest awards for gallantry - among other - having been awarded to its members, Paratrooper Battalion 263 is the most decorated unit of the modern German Army. In 2008, the battalion's 2nd company suffered casualties to the amount of one quarter of its manpower.

Following a restructuring of the German armed forces, the battalion was integrated into the newly raised Paratrooper Regiment 26.

== Structure ==
- Paratrooper Battalion 263
  - Command- and support company
    - K9 platoon
    - Scout platoon
  - 2nd Parachute Infantry Company
  - 3rd Parachute Infantry Company
  - 4th Parachute Infantry Company
  - 5th Fire Support Company
  - 6th Parachute Infantry Company (Training and Force Protection)

== See also ==
- Fallschirmjäger
