= Good Friday Battle =

Deadly military ambush in Afghanistan in 2010

Good Friday Engagement
Date	April 2, 2010
Location	Near Isa Khel in Kunduz Province, Afghanistan
Result	Unknown

Belligerents
Germany; United States; Islamic Republic of Afghanistan	Taliban (al-Qaeda) Islamic Movement of Uzbekistan

Strength
Unknown	70–80 insurgents

Casualties and losses
9 killed, 8 wounded	>5 killed

The Good Friday Engagement took place on April 2, 2010 as part of the Bundeswehr's operation in Afghanistan between a paratrooper unit and members of the Taliban. These were supported by the Islamic Movement of Uzbekistan. Three paratroopers were killed in the engagement. In the engagement, German soldiers were involved in prolonged combat operations with their own losses for the first time since the Second World War.

== Background ==
The engagement took place in the Kunduz area as part of the ISAF operations there and German participation in the war in Afghanistan.

== Engagement ==
On April 2, 2010, soldiers from Paratrooper Battalion 373 from Seedorf were tasked with clearing up and removing booby traps. At around 1 P.M. local time, the 34 paratroopers, led by their company commander, came under ambush from 30 to 40 insurgents. Three soldiers were wounded early on, two of them seriously, Sergeant Naef Adebahr and Corporal Robert Hartert. The company commander called for reinforcements, whereupon a reserve company from the Kunduz field camp set out.

The engagement was observed with Luna and KZO reconnaissance drones. Fighter aircraft from the United States military were also over the field, but were unable to intervene due to the risk of friendly fire. Senior Staff Surgeon Ulrike Hödel and Sergeant Major Gerhard Haben worked as medics in the combat zone to treat the wounded, who were later picked up by US Black Hawk helicopters under fire at the landing zone and flown to the German operational hospital in Kunduz. While trying to break away from the enemy, a Dingo fell into a booby trap at around 2:50 p.m. resulting in four more wounded paratroopers (three of them seriously), including Sergeant Major Nils Bruns and Corporal Martin Augustyniak.

At the same time, around 40 insurgents attacked a nearby Afghan police camp at 3:35 p.m.; this attack could be repelled. As the engagement between the German paratroopers and the insurgents continued, four more soldiers were wounded. It was only after eight hours of fighting that the reserve company was able to relieve the paratroopers, who then returned to the Kunduz field camp, which they reached around 9:50 p.m. During the course of the engagement, the Bundeswehr soldiers fired over 25,000 shots. The engagement lasted nine hours. A description of the engagement and a critical statement from one of the soldiers involved can be found in the NDR podcast “Killed in Action – Germany at War”.

As part of Operation Door, the doors of the destroyed Dingo combat vehicle were recovered on September 9, 2011 by Panzergrenadiers from a combat unit of Task Force Kunduz III (training and protection battalion) in Isakhel, and later at the grove of honor of the 2nd Infantry Company in the Kunduz camp that had been set up. They have now found their place in a memorial room of the paratrooper regiment in Seedorf.

== Aftermath ==
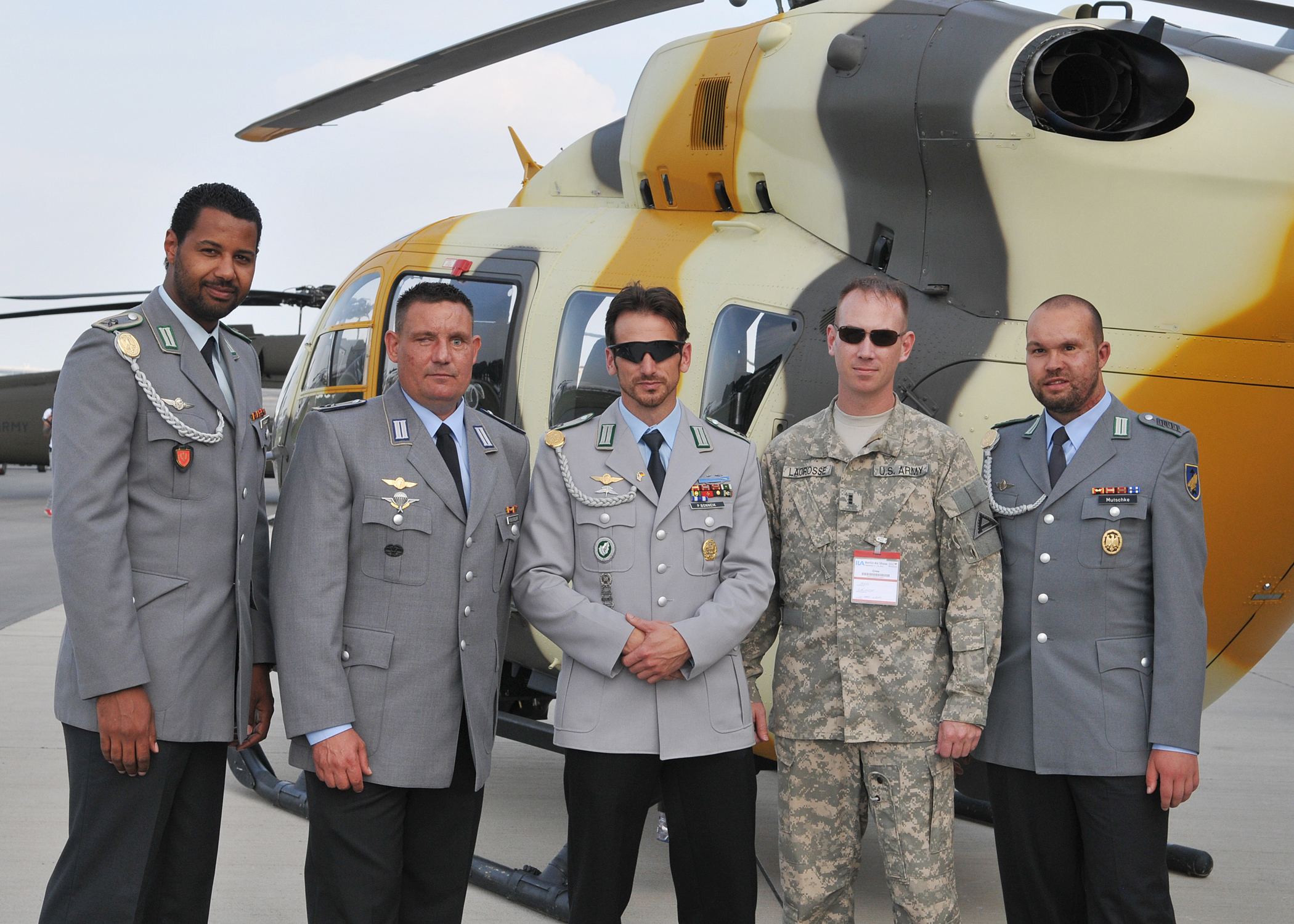
Naef Adebahr (first from left), Ralf Rönckendorf (second from left), Jason LaCrosse (second from right), and Maik Mutschke (first from right) in September 2012 with a German member (center) of the “Joint Tactical Air Command,” which had organized the evacuation by U.S. forces.

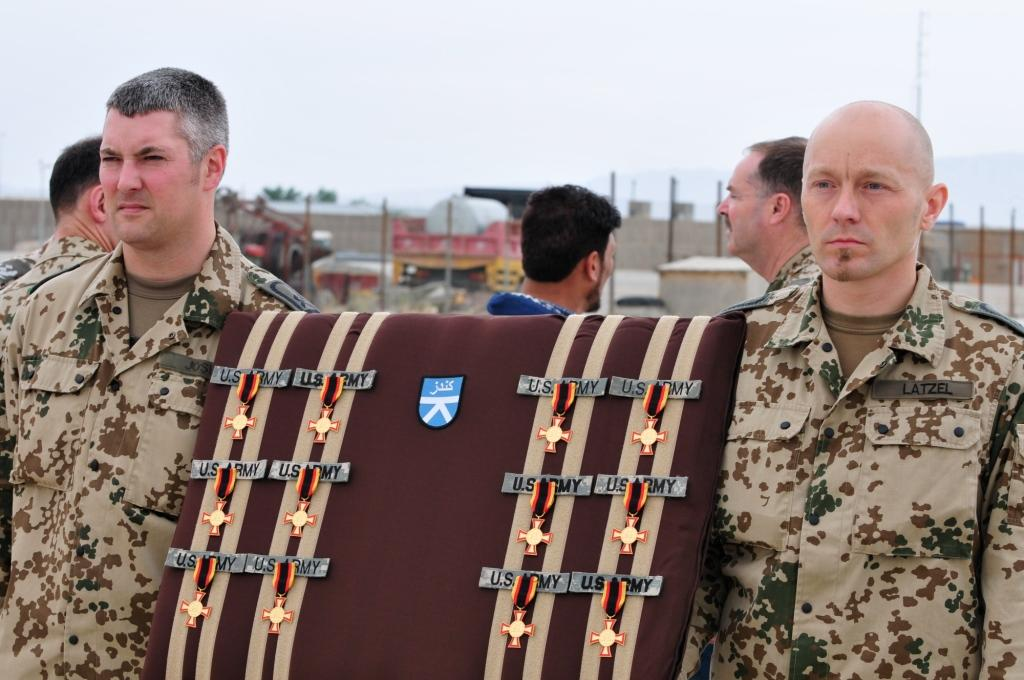
The Crosses of Honor for the helicopter crews

=== Fatalities ===
Sergeant Major Nils Bruns, Corporal Robert Hartert, and Corporal Martin Augustyniak, all from Paratrooper Battalion 373, were killed in the engagement. They are commemorated, among other places, in the Forest of Remembrance, where the Kunduz Grove of Honor is now located. In Bielefeld-Quelle, after some political discussion, a place in memory of Corporal Martin Kadir Augustyniak was named after him and decorated with a memorial stone and an information stele.

Civilian pickup trucks carrying soldiers from the Afghan army were mistakenly shot at by a Marder armored personnel carrier from the reserve company. During the approach, the German soldiers feared another attack by insurgents and gave signals to stop. Since these were ignored, shelling ensued and six of the soldiers were killed.

According to the head of Afghan intelligence, at least five Taliban were killed in the engagement, including a local leader.

=== Awards ===
Mario Kunert, Philipp Oliver Pordzik, Ralf Rönckendorf, Maik Mutschke, Robert Hartert and Martin Kadir Augustyniak were awarded the Bundeswehr Cross of Honor for their efforts. Nils Bruns, Ulrike Hödel and Gerhard Haben received the Bundeswehr Cross of Honor in gold in a special version for their outstanding achievements. The American soldiers Robert McDonough, Steven Husted, Jason LaCrosse, Nelson Visaya, Jason Brown, Sean Johnson, Eric Wells, Travis Brown, William Ebel, Antonio Gattis, Steven Shumaker, Matthew Baker, Todd Marchese and Gregory Martinez were recognized for their outstanding service, receiving the gold cross of honor.

A special gold cross of honor was also awarded for his achievements in rescuing the wounded. LaCrosse was also awarded the Silver Star, and the others (except Martinez) received the Distinguished Flying Cross. Ralf Rönckendorf, who saved the life of a comrade under fire and lost his eyesight, was honored with the Bambi media prize in 2011.

=== Reactions ===
Former German Defense Minister Thomas de Maizière said after the engagement: “Kunduz, for us this is the place where the Bundeswehr fought for the first time and had to learn to fight. That was a turning point – not only for the Bundeswehr, but also for German society.” It was the first military operation since the Second World War in which several German soldiers died in combat. Defense Minister at the time was Karl-Theodor zu Guttenberg.

== See also ==
- Operation Halmazag
- Battle of Mosul, a large-scale military operation in 2016 and 2017
