= Badge of Honour of the Bundeswehr =

Decorations of Honour of the Bundeswehr Ehrenzeichen der Bundeswehr
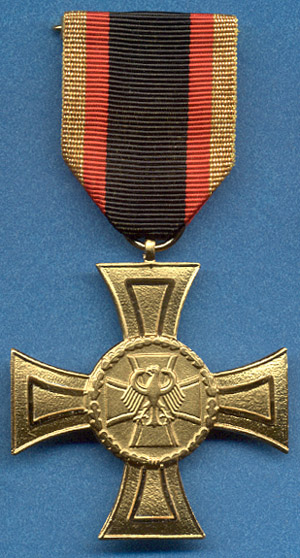
- Gold Cross of Honour, for exemplary and meritorious service
- Type: Military Medal
- Awarded for: Valor or meritorious service
- Description: Comes in five classes: gold with clasp for bravery. Gold, silver, bronze crosses & bronze medal
- Presented by: Federal Republic of Germany
- Eligibility: Soldiers of the German armed forces and of allied nations, civilians who rendered outstanding services to the German armed forces
- Status: Currently awarded
- Established: October 29, 1980 and October 10, 2008
- Website: https://www.bundeswehr.de/en/about-bundeswehr/identity-of-the-bundeswehr/bundeswehr-decorations-awards/badge-of-honour-bundeswehr

The Decorations of Honour of the Bundeswehr (German: Ehrenzeichen der Bundeswehr) are the sole series of military decorations of the Bundeswehr, the armed forces of the Federal Republic of Germany. These honours and awards were introduced in 1980 on the occasion of the 25th anniversary of the Bundeswehr by then Minister of Defence Hans Apel and subsequently approved by President of the Federal Republic Karl Carstens.

The first awards were made on November 6, 1980. In 2008, the decorations were updated and received three grades exclusively reserved for heroic deeds. The new awards were the result of a petition by German citizens to restore the order of the Iron Cross, which itself, however, was never reinstituted.

Germany, sworn to peace and to abstain military power after more than 75 years of dominating neighbours with military might in the 19th and 20th century, has been hesitant towards decorations ever since WWII, for their distinctiveness has been diluted heavily by the former Wehrmacht and its inflationary practice of awarding, which sought to keep up morale in face of battle. However, reinstituting decorations for the armed forces of a German democracy has been the result of a long-lasting desire of Germany's volunteers for societal recognition, as well as allied forces being increasingly bewildered over Germany's posture towards decorations, for Germany's soldiers stood the test in battle with allied democracies time after time.

The awards are not exclusive to German soldiers. Germany follows the tradition of many NATO members to award the decoration to allied forces as well as to their own.

== Award ==
The decoration is awarded by the Federal Minister of Defence as a "visible commendation for loyal service and exemplary execution of duties". The minister is usually represented by the commanding officer of the awarded soldier (ranked battalion commander or higher). Those awards made for outstanding achievements or heroic deeds, Honour Cross for Bravery (silver or golden), may be presented to the honoured soldier directly by the minister or even by the head of government. On July 6 2009, Chancellor Angela Merkel awarded the highest grade of the Ehrenkreuz der Bundeswehr (Cross of Honour) to four troopers for "valor beyond the call of duty" performed in Afghanistan on October 20, 2008.

Receiving one grade of the award is not a requirement for receipt of the next higher one. If earned, all grades of the award may be worn at the same time. The regular grades of the award for meritorious service may only be awarded after a certain time was served. In special cases they may be awarded prior to that.

== Grades ==
The badge of honour comes in seven grades:

1. Ehrenmedaille der Bundeswehr (Medal of Honour), for exemplary service and meritorious service over 7 months or exemplary achievements
2. Ehrenkreuz der Bundeswehr in Bronze (Bronze Cross of Honour), for exemplary and meritious service over 5 years or exemplary achievements
  1. Ehrenkreuz der Bundeswehr in Silber (Silver Cross of Honour), for exemplary and meritious service over 10 years or exemplary achievements
  2. Ehrenkreuz der Bundeswehr in Silber in besonderer Ausführung (Silver Cross of Honour for Outstanding Deeds), for outstanding deeds and extraordinary achievements
  1. Ehrenkreuz der Bundeswehr in Gold (Gold Cross of Honour), for exemplary and meritorious service over 20 years or exemplary achievements
  2. Ehrenkreuz der Bundeswehr in Gold in besonderer Ausführung (Gold Cross of Honour for Outstanding Deeds), for outstanding deeds at the risk of one's life
3. Ehrenkreuz der Bundeswehr für Tapferkeit (Cross of Honour for Bravery), for valor beyond the call of duty

The Decorations of Honour are awarded with a black-red-golden ribbon and a certificate of commendation. They are worn in full display on the day of the award or on special occasions. On regular duty they are worn as a ribbon bar.

== Design ==
The Honour Medal is round, shows a German eagle on a Cross pattée surrounded by a wreath of oak leaves. On the reverse it reads FÜR BESONDERE VERDIENSTE BUNDESWEHR (For exceptional merits — Bundeswehr). There is an oak leaf above the word Bundeswehr and that side is also surrounded by an oak leaves wreath.

The four higher grades are in the shape of a cross and in the center is the round design of the lowest medal, the reverse reads "For Service".

The ribbon is black with two red stripes beside it and golden stripes on the edges as the colors of the German flag, the ribbon bar has a small clasp of the decoration grade attached to it.

The new grades of the Silver Cross of Honour and the Gold Cross of Honour have a red edge (also as a miniature on the ribbon bar). The design of the Gold Cross of Honour and the Cross of Honour for Bravery is the same, however latter has a cluster of double-sided oak leaves attached to it.

Honour Medal	Cross of Honour in bronze	Cross of Honour in silver	Cross of Honour in silver for Outstanding Deeds	Cross of Honour in gold	Cross of Honour in gold for Outstanding Deeds	Cross of Honour for Valour

== Recipients ==
=== For meritorious service ===
Decorations for meritorious service have been awarded since 1980 and are not rare. However, only 30 awards - of which 14 have been to foreign service members - have been bestowed upon soldiers for outstanding achievements and conspicuous gallantry so far. The recipients were:

=== Cross of Honour for Valour ===
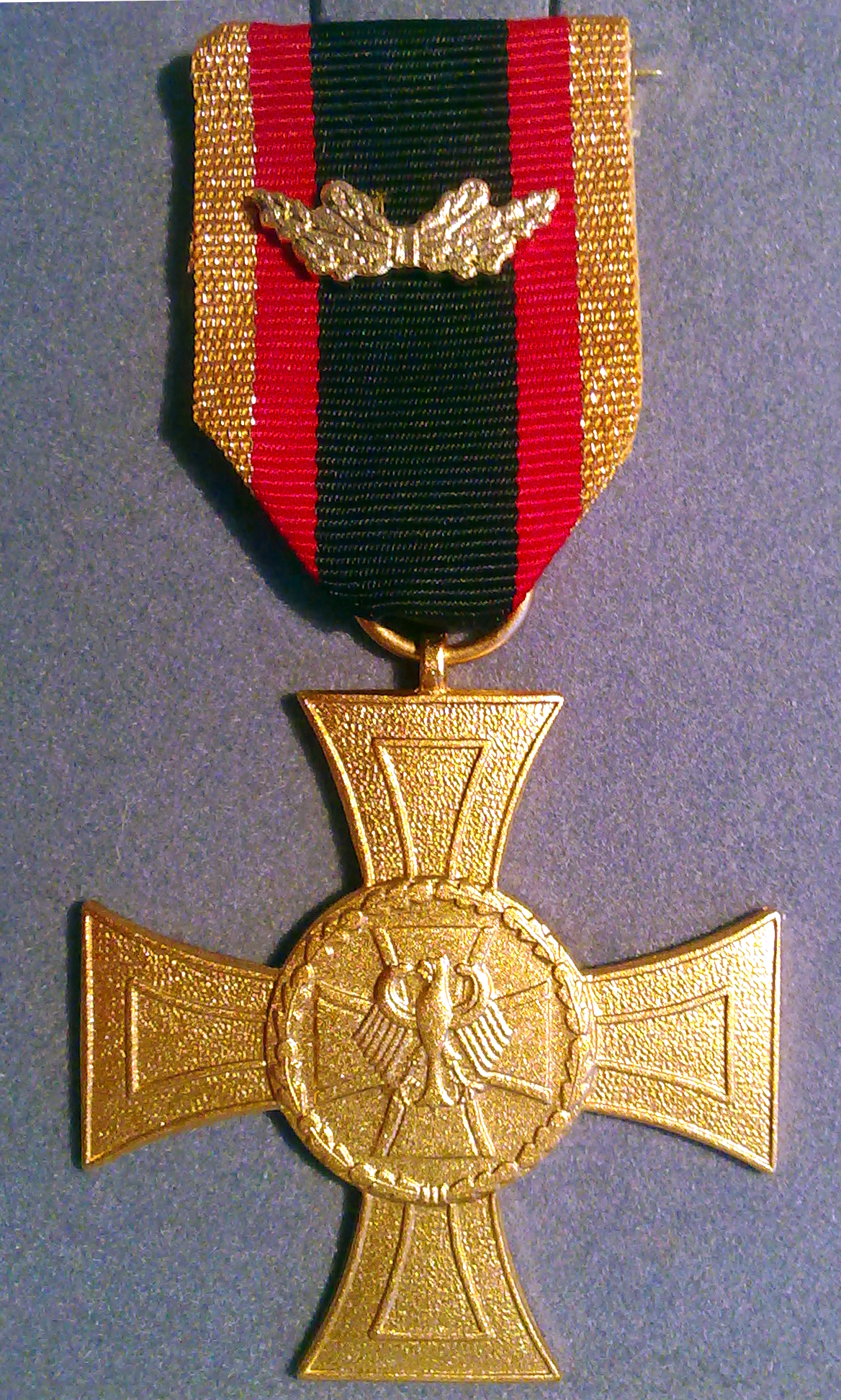
Cross of Honour for Valour

for bravery in a life-threatening situation on October 20, 2008

- Sergeant 1st Class Jan BERGES, Paratrooper Battalion 263, German Army
- Sergeant 1st Class Alexander DIETZEN, Paratrooper Battalion 263, German Army
- Sergeant 1st Class Henry LUKÀCS, Paratrooper Battalion 263, German Army
- Staff Sergeant Markus GEIST, Paratrooper Battalion 263, German Army

A suicide bomber attacked a German patrol in Kunduz, North Afghanistan on October 20, 2008. The Mungo infantry carrier the Germans had travelled in caught fire and large quantities of ammunition exploded. A German soldier and five Afghan children were immediately killed by the blast. Three other troopers and a child were seriously injured. Sergeants Berges, Dietzen, Lukács, and Geist rushed to their aid and were eventually able to rescue two German soldiers and one child at the risk of their lives. They also rescued another soldier who had suffered mortal wounds and was trapped inside the destroyed vehicle.

for conspicuous gallantry in combat on June 4, 2009

- Sergeant 1st Class Daniel SEIBERT, Mechanized Infantry Battalion 212, German Army
- Sergeant 1st Class Jan HECHT, Mechanized Infantry Battalion 391, German Army

Seibert, a squad leader, and Hecht, a platoon leader, led their platoon to the rescue of a small reconnaissance team surrounded by an overwhelming insurgent force near Basoz, Afghanistan on June 4, 2009. The combined forces - still greatly outnumbered - managed to fend off the attackers in a fight that partly developed into a close quarters combat. Scores of insurgents were killed but thanks to Seibert's and Hecht's leadership, the Germans suffered no casualties.

for conspicuous gallantry in combat on June 7, 2009

- Staff Sergeant Steffen KNOSKA, Air Assault Regiment 1, German Army

Knoska, a squad leader, led his soldiers during a firefight with insurgents when a German trooper was seriously injured near Kunduz, Afghanistan on June 7, 2009. Knoska charged into incoming fire to rescue the immobilised and helpless soldier, and did not even give in when a bullet hit his helmet.

for conspicuous gallantry in combat on April 2, 2010 during the Good Friday Battle

- Sergeant 1st Class Mario KUNERT, Paratrooper Battalion 373, German Army
- Sergeant 1st Class Philipp Oliver PORDZIK, Paratrooper Battalion 373, German Army
- Sergeant 1st Class Ralf RÖNCKENDORF, Paratrooper Battalion 373, German Army
- Corporal Maik MUTSCHKE, Paratrooper Battalion 373, German Army
- Corporal Robert HARTERT, Paratrooper Battalion 373, German Army (posthumous)
- Private First Class Martin AUGUSTYNIAK, Paratrooper Battalion 373, German Army (posthumous)

On April 2, 2010, a parachute infantry platoon of 32 men was ambushed during an IED sweep in Chardara's Isa Khel neighbourhood and surrounded by thrice as many hostiles. Cut off from reinforcements, the troops fought for their lives for nine hours with the platoon basically ending up incapacitated. The honoured soldiers distinguished themselves by showing great courage and self-abandonment according to the citation.

for conspicuous gallantry in combat on April 15, 2010

- Captain Jakob KLÖTZNER

In the course of Operation Taohid II, an ISAF offensive against insurgent forces in Baghlan province, a German Mowag Eagle armored vehicle was hit by an IED. Three soldiers were killed and five other wounded. Captain Klötzner gathered his troops and commanded the rescue under enemy fire, bringing back the injured soldiers to safety.

for conspicuous gallantry in combat on October 7, 2010

- Lieutenant Colonel Jared SEMBRITZKI

Sembritzki, a battalion commander, led his troops during an insurgent assault on a combat outpost near Shahabuddin, Afghanistan while under massive fire on October 7, 2010. His actions, described as particularly dauntless and courageous, were crucial to keeping control of the outpost and averting a possible threat to coalition efforts in the entire province.

=== Gold Cross of Honour for Outstanding Deeds ===
for exemplary fulfillment of the soldier's duty on June 13, 1999

- Lieutenant David Ferk

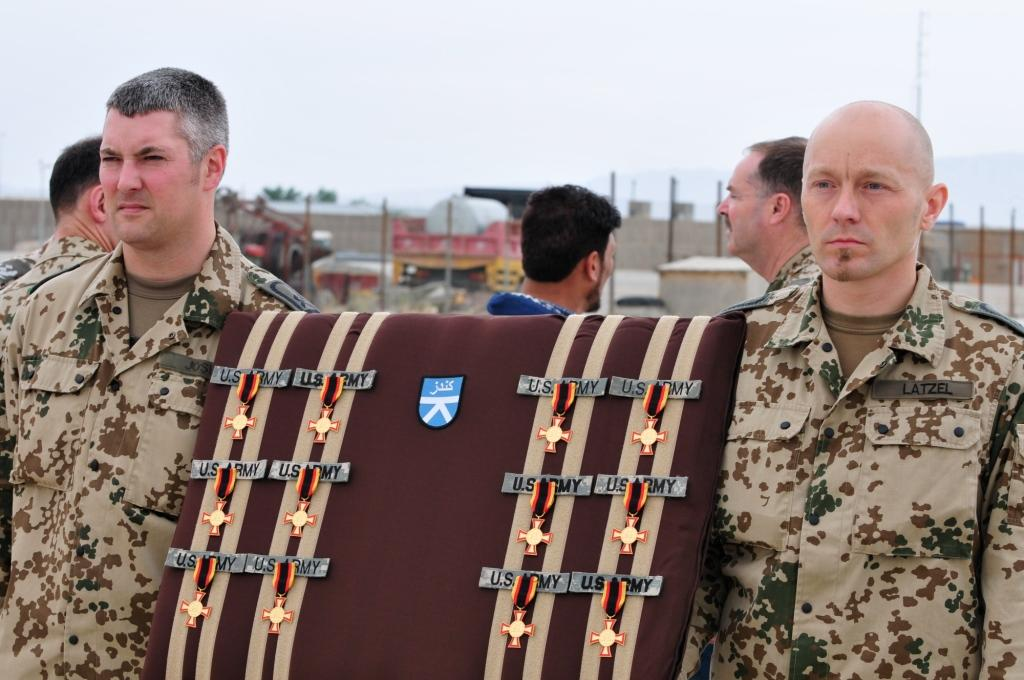
Award ceremony for 14 Gold Crosses of Honour for Outstanding Deeds on April 2, 2010

for valor in combat on April 2, 2010 during the Good Friday Battle

- Captain Robert McDONOUGH, 5th Battalion, 158th Aviation Regiment, United States Army
- Chief Warrant Officer 3 Steven HUSTED, 5th Battalion, 158th Aviation Regiment, United States Army
- Chief Warrant Officer 3 Jason LaCROSSE, 5th Battalion, 158th Aviation Regiment, United States Army
- Chief Warrant Officer 3 Nelson VISAYA, 5th Battalion, 158th Aviation Regiment, United States Army
- Chief Warrant Officer 2 Jason BROWN, 5th Battalion, 158th Aviation Regiment, United States Army
- Chief Warrant Officer 2 Sean JOHNSON, 5th Battalion, 158th Aviation Regiment, United States Army
- Chief Warrant Officer 2 Eric WELLS, 5th Battalion, 158th Aviation Regiment, United States Army
- Staff Sergeant Travis BROWN, 5th Battalion, 158th Aviation Regiment, United States Army
- Sergeant William EBEL, 5th Battalion, 158th Aviation Regiment, United States Army
- Sergeant Antonio GATTIS, 5th Battalion, 158th Aviation Regiment, United States Army
- Sergeant Steven SHUMAKER, 5th Battalion, 158th Aviation Regiment, United States Army
- Sergeant Matthew BAKER, 5th Battalion, 158th Aviation Regiment, United States Army
- Sergeant Todd MARCHESE, 5th Battalion, 158th Aviation Regiment, United States Army
- Sergeant Gregory MARTINEZ, 5th Battalion, 158th Aviation Regiment, United States Army

The U.S. MEDEVAC crewmen were honoured with the Gold Cross of Honour for Outstanding Deeds for risking their lives to come to the rescue of German soldiers, who were ambushed by as many as 200 Taliban fighters during a patrol north of the city of Kunduz on April 2. Their reluctance to abandon the Germans had a great impact upon the result of the battle; of 11 German troops seriously wounded in action that day, only three succumbed to their wounds.

for valor in combat on April 2, 2010

- Sergeant 1st Class Nils BRUNS, Paratrooper Battalion 373, German Army (posthumous)

On April 2, 2010, a parachute infantry platoon of 32 men was ambushed during an IED sweep in Chardara's Isa Khel neighbourhood and surrounded by thrice as many hostiles. Cut off from reinforcements, the troops fought for their lives for nine hours with the platoon basically ending up incapacitated. Bruns was killed in combat when he rushed to the aid of a severely wounded soldier. He was posthumously awarded the Gold Cross of Honour for Outstanding Deeds.

for great civil courage on September 21, 2010

- Recruit Roman WINS, Naval Infantry Battalion, Eckernförde

Wins (a conscript doing his military service) was travelling on a commuter bus in Kiel when a man attacked the bus driver with a knife and injured her severely. Wins went to the driver's rescue together with another passenger. When the attacker fled Wins followed and overwhelmed him. For his courage Wins was awarded the Gold Cross of Honour for Outstanding Deeds.

=== Silver Cross of Honour for Outstanding Deeds ===
for great civil courage on April 6, 2010

- Private 1st Class Martin SCHLAFLECHNER, Armoured Troops School, German Army

The trooper was off-duty when he witnessed a brawl. He stepped in, held the brawlers off each other, and handed them over to the police, by doing so ending a confrontation which could have come to a more serious end. For his courage, he was honoured with the Silver Cross of Honour for Outstanding Deeds.

for great civil courage on September 12, 2001

- Specialist Kenneth CRAFT, 132nd Engineer BN, California Army National Guard

On September 12, 2001, the soldier was part of an exchange program with German and National Guard soldiers when he was the initial medical response person to a near fatal stabbing to a civilian contractor by German military personnel. The assailants were still in the building where he was performing advance medical care. Had he not been there, the end could have been more serious. He is acknowledged to be the first United States Army Soldier to have been awarded the Silver Cross of Honour.

for an outstanding contribution to international partnership and cooperation

- Col. David E. Shank, commander, 10th Army Air and Missile Defense Command

Under Shank’s leadership, NATO-integrated air and missile defense within Germany and Europe were strengthened, culminating in a combined exercise.

14 US soldiers receive German honor cross for war in Afgahnistan conduct: https://www.dvidshub.net/news/49603/us-soldiers-awarded-highest-german-medal-bravery-during-rescue

== See also ==
- Awards and decorations of the German Armed Forces
- Combat Action Medal of the Bundeswehr
- Orders, decorations, and medals of the Federal Republic of Germany
