= Orders, decorations, and medals of the Federal Republic of Germany =

After World War II, Germany was split into several different occupation zones. But later the different occupation zones were merged into East and West Germany. West Germany is where the modern German state gets its current traditions of medals and decorations from.

== Federal State Orders ==
Badge and ribbon	Name (English/German)	Creation date – cessation date	Description	Number awarded
Order of Merit of the Federal Republic of Germany	Order of Merit of the Federal Republic of Germany Verdienstorden der Bundesrepublik Deutschland, or Bundesverdienstorden,	7 September 1951	A golden cross enamelled in red	260,429

== Federally recognized orders ==
Badge and ribbon	Name (English/German)	Creation date – cessation date	Description	Number awarded
	Pour le Mérite for the arts and sciences Pour le Mérite für wissenschaft und künste	7 June 1740 (whole order) 31 May 1842 (separate class) 1952 (re-established)	Awarded to men and women who, through widespread recognition for their contributions to science and art, have made an eminent name for themselves	Unknown
	Order of Saint John Johanniterorden	1099 (Whole order) 1852 (re-established)	For outstanding achievements in charity and support to the sick and needy	

== Orders of the German States ==
Badge and ribbon	Name (English/German)	Creation date – cessation date	Description	Number awarded
	Order of Merit of Baden-Württemberg Verdienstorden des Landes Baden-Württemberg	26 November 1974	Outstanding contributions to the state of Baden-Wuerttemberg, in politics, society, culture and economics.	1,989 (as of 2021)
	Bavarian Order of Merit Bayerischer Verdienstorden	11 June 1957	Men and women without distinction of nationality or class who have made outstanding contributions to the Free State of Bavaria and the Bavarian people.	5725
	Bavarian Maximilian Order for arts and sciences Bayerischer Maximiliansorden für Wissenschaft und Kunst	28 November 1853 (Whole order) 18 March 1980 (re-established)	Outstanding achievements in the field of science and art.	573
	Order of Merit of Berlin Verdienstorden des Landes Berlin	21 July 1987	Outstanding contributions to the state of Berlin	454 (as of 1 October 2018}
	Order of Merit of Brandenburg Verdienstorden des Landes Brandenburg	10 July 2003	Highest civic recognition that the State of Brandenburg can present for extraordinary services to the state and its people.	108
	Hessian Order of Merit Hessischer Verdienstorden	1 December 1989	Outstanding contributions to Hesse, without regard to residence or citizenship.	430
	Order of Merit of Mecklenburg-Vorpommern Verdienstorden des Landes Mecklenburg-Vorpommern	23 April 2001	Exceptional performance over a long period of time, or an extraordinary individual performance for the benefit of Mecklenburg-Vorpommern.	60 (as of 2020)
	Lower Saxony Order of Merit Niedersächsischer Verdienstorden	27 March 1961	Outstanding selfless commitment to the development of Lower Saxony and its culture.	342 Grand Cross; 737 Cross of Merit; 1272 Cross of Merit on Ribbon (as of 2013)
	Order of Merit of North Rhine-Westphalia Verdienstorden des Landes Nordrhein-Westfalen	11 March 1986	Extraordinary contributions to the people and state of North Rhine-Westphalia.	
	Order of Merit of Rhineland-Palatinate Verdienstorden des Landes Rheinland-Pfalz	2 October 1981	Outstanding service to the state and people of Rhineland-Palatinate.	1035
	Saarland Order of Merit Saarländischer Verdienstorden	10 December 1974	Outstanding service to Saarland.	367
	Order of Merit of the Free State of Saxony Sächsischer Verdienstorden	27 October 1997	Outstanding contributions to the people and state of Saxony.	363
	Order of Merit of Saxony-Anhalt Verdienstorden des Landes Sachsen-Anhalt	23 May 2006	Exceptional performance over a longer period of time or an extraordinary individual performance for Saxony-Anhalt and its citizens.	18
	Order of Merit of Schleswig-Holstein Verdienstorden des Landes Schleswig-Holstein	26 February 2008	Outstanding service to Schleswig-Holstein.	
	Order of Merit of the Free State of Thuringia Verdienstorden des Freistaats Thüringen	19 September 2000	Outstanding service to Thuringia.	97

== Awards of the Federal Ministry of the Interior ==
These awards and decorations are awarded by the Minister of Interior to members of the Bundeswehr, Bundespolizei, Technisches Hilfswerk.

Badge and ribbon	Name (English/German)	Creation date – cessation date	Description	Number awarded
	German Flood Service Medal 2002 Einsatzmedaille Fluthilfe 2002	September 20, 2002	for service during the 2002 European floods to members of Technisches Hilfswerk, the Bundeswehr, the Bundesgrenzschutz, foreign armed forces, as well as civilians who assisted the aforementioned organizations	???
	German Flood Service Medal 2013 Einsatzmedaille Fluthilfe 2013	July 2, 2013	for service during the 2013 European floods by members of the Bundeswehr, Bundespolizei, Technisches Hilfswerk, foreign armed forces, as well as civilians who provided assistance to the relief efforts of the federal agencies	???
	Decoration of the Federal Agency for Technical Relief Ehrenzeichen des Technischen Hilfswerks	September 2, 1975	meritorious service in the field of emergency management or civil protection	???

== Awards of the Federal Ministry of Defence ==
These Orders and decorations are all awarded to soldiers of Germany and its allies by the Bundeswehr.

Badge and ribbon	Name (English/German)	Creation date – cessation date	Description	Number awarded
	Cross of Honour for Bravery Ehrenkreuz der Bundeswehr für Tapferkeit	October 10, 2008	for valor beyond the call of duty	30
	Gold Cross of Honour for Outstanding Deeds Ehrenkreuz der Bundeswehr in Gold für besonders herausragende Taten	October 10, 2008	for outstanding deeds at the risk of one's life	???
	Gold Cross of Honour Ehrenkreuz der Bundeswehr in Gold	October 29, 1980	for exemplary and meritorious service over 20 years or exemplary achievements	???
	Silver Cross of Honour for Outstanding Deeds Ehrenkreuz der Bundeswehr in Silber für besonders herausragende Taten	October 10, 2008	for outstanding deeds and extraordinary achievements	???
	Silver Cross of Honour Ehrenkreuz der Bundeswehr in Silber	October 29, 1980	for exemplary and meritious service over 10 years or exemplary achievements	???
	Bronze Cross of Honour Ehrenkreuz der Bundeswehr in Bronze	October 29, 1980	for exemplary and meritious service over 5 years or exemplary achievements	???
	Honor Medal of the Bundeswehr Ehrenmedaille der Bundeswehr	October 29, 1980	for exemplary service and meritorious service over 7 months or exemplary achievements	???
	Combat Action Medal Einsatzmedaille Gefecht	November 2010	for active participation in ground or surface combat or suffering from terrorist or military violence with exposure to a high personal risk	5,845
	Deployment Medal Einsatzmedaille der Bundeswehr	April 25, 1996	for military service in a designated military campaign or operation	317,394 bronze 13,730 silver 1,398 gold (as of March 2019)

=== Denazified decorations after 1957 ===
These awards were reintroduced in 1957 after they had been denazified.

Badge and ribbon	Name (English/German)	Creation date – cessation date	Description	Number awarded
	Knight's Cross of the Iron Cross with Oak Leaves and Swords; Ritterkreuz des Eisernen Kreuzes mit Eichenlaub und Schwertern	1 September 1939 – 8 May 1945	For continuous bravery before the enemy or excellence in commanding troops after being awarded all preceding classes of the Knight's Cross/Iron Cross.	160
	Iron Cross (1st Class); Eisernes Kreuz 1. Klasse	1 September 1939 – 8 May 1945	For continuous bravery before the enemy or excellence in commanding troops after being awarded the Iron Cross 2nd class.	c. 300,000
	Iron Cross (2nd Class); Eisernes Kreuz 2. Klasse	1 September 1939 – 8 May 1945	For bravery before the enemy or excellence in commanding troops.	c. 4,500,000
	1939 Clasp to the Iron Cross; Spange zum Eisernen Kreuz	1 September 1939 – 8 May 1945	An award of the Iron Cross, 1st or 2nd class for those who had already received the decoration in World War I.	100,000+
	German Cross in Gold; Kriegsorden des Deutschen Kreuzes in Gold	28 September 1941 – 8 May 1945	For continuous bravery before the enemy or excellence in commanding troops (not justifying the Knight's Cross of the Iron Cross but having already been awarded the Iron Cross 1st Class)	24,204
	German Cross in Silver; Kriegsorden des Deutschen Kreuzes in Silber	28 September 1941 – 8 May 1945	For significant performances in aiding the military war effort. (Not justifying the Knight's Cross of either the Iron Cross or the War Merit Cross but having already been awarded the Iron Cross 1st Class or War Merit Cross 1st Class)	1,115
	Golden Knights Cross of the War Merit Cross; Goldenes Ritterkreuz des Kriegsverdienstkreuz	13 October 1944 – 8 May 1945	Awarded with and without swords. For outstanding contributions to the war effort.	2
	Knights Cross of the War Merit Cross; Ritterkreuz des Kriegsverdienstkreuz	19 August 1940 – 8 May 1945	Awarded with and without swords. For meritorious contributions to the war effort after being awarded all preceding classes of the War Merit Cross.	c. 250
	War Merit Cross (1st Class); Kriegsverdienstkreuz 1. Klasse	18 October 1939 – 8 May 1945	Awarded with and without swords. For meritorious contributions to the war effort after being awarded the War Merit Cross, 2nd class.	c. 480,000 with swords c. 90,000 without swords
	War Merit Cross (2nd Class); Kriegsverdienstkreuz 2. Klasse	18 October 1939 – 8 May 1945	Awarded with and without swords. For meritorious contributions to the war effort.	c. 6,100,000 with swords c. 1,500,000 without swords
	Wound Badge Verwundetenabzeichen	3 March 1918 – 11 November 1918 1 September 1939 – 8 May 1945	Wounds whilst in active service	c. 1,000,000 during ww1 c. 5,000,000 during ww2

== Old royal orders recognized by the state ==
Badge and ribbon	Name (English/German)	Creation date – cessation date	Description	Number awarded
	Order of the Black Eagle Schwarzer Adlerorden	1701 - 1918 (State Order) 1918 - Now (House Order)	Members of ruling houses, senior civil and military officials and other worthy figures appointed by the King of Prussia.	407 (as of 1918)
	House Order of Hohenzollern Hausorden von Hohenzollern	???	???	???

== See also ==
- Orders, decorations, and medals of the German states
- Awards and decorations of the German Armed Forces
