= Historical orders, decorations, and medals of Germany =

Orders, decorations, and medals of Germany include:

== History ==
- Orders, decorations, and medals of the German Empire (1871–1918)
- Orders, decorations, and medals of the Weimar Republic (1918–1933)
- Orders, decorations, and medals of Nazi Germany (1933–1945)
- Orders, decorations, and medals of East Germany (1949–1990)
- Orders, decorations, and medals of the Federal Republic of Germany (1949– )

== Present day ==
- Orders, decorations, and medals of the German states
- Awards and decorations of the German Armed Forces
- Order of Merit of the Federal Republic of Germany
  - List of recipients of the Order of Merit of the Federal Republic of Germany
