= German Flood Service Medal =

German Flood Service Medal may refer to:

- German Flood Service Medal (2002)
- German Flood Service Medal (2013)
