= Orders, decorations, and medals of the German states =

The orders, decorations, and medals of the German states, in which each states of Germany has devised a system of orders and awards to honour residents for actions or deeds that benefit their local community or state, are in turn subsumed within the German honours system. Each state sets their own rules and criteria on eligibility and also how each medal is awarded and presented. Most of the orders allow for the recipient to wear their orders in public.

== History ==
Most of the orders have the form of a maltese cross.

=== Hanseatic rejection ===
The city states of Bremen and Hamburg do not allocate any orders. An exception was made during World War I when the Hanseatic Cross was awarded jointly with the city of Lübeck. Even today, senators of the two states reject any foreign orders. Former German chancellor Helmut Schmidt received a number of accolades, among them was the Grand Cross of the Order of Merit of the Federal Republic of Germany, which he chose not to accept in Hanseatic tradition, in order to refuse any decoration presented for merely fulfilling one's duty.

== State orders ==
| State | Name | Ribbon bar | Established | Number of inductees | Living holders | Limit of living holders | Note |
|---|---|---|---|---|---|---|---|
| Baden-Württemberg | Order of Merit of Baden-Württemberg | | 1974 | 1,754 | | 1,000 | |
| Bavaria | Bavarian Maximilian Order for Science and Art | | 1980 | 184 | 92 | 100 | Re-establishment of the order from 1853 |
| Bavaria | Bavarian Order of Merit | | 1957 | 5,537 | 1,637 | 2,000 | |
| Bavaria | Bayerischer Verfassungsorden | | 1961 (2011) | | | | |
| Berlin | Order of Merit of Berlin | | 1987 | 431 | | 400 | |
| Brandenburg | Order of Merit of Brandenburg | | 2003 | 108 | | 300 | |
| Hesse | Hessian Order of Merit Presented in two grades: Cross of Merit (Verdienstkreuz); Cross (Verdienstkreuz am Bande) | | 1989 | 430 | | 800 | |
| Lower Saxony | Lower Saxony Order of Merit Presented in three grades: Commander's Cross (Großes Verdienstkreuz); Officer's Cross (Verdienstkreuz 1. Klasse); Cross (Verdienstkreuz am Bande) | | 1961 | | | no limit | |
| Lower Saxony | Flood-Medal 2013 of the State of Lower Saxony | | 2013 | 20,000 | | no official limit, but was only awarded in 2013 | For helpers during the 2013 European floods, who did their duty in the State of Lower Saxony |
| Lower Saxony | Lower Saxonian State Medal | | | 54 | 24 | no official limit but unofficially 30 | |
| Mecklenburg-Vorpommern | Order of Merit of Mecklenburg-Vorpommern | | 2001 | | | no limit | |
| North Rhine-Westphalia | Order of Merit of North Rhine-Westphalia | | 1986 | 1,357 | | 3,500 | |
| Rhineland-Palatinate | Order of Merit of Rhineland-Palatinate | | 1981 | 991 | | 800 | |
| Saarland | Saarland Order of Merit | | 1974 | | | no limit | |
| Saxony | Order of Merit of the Free State of Saxony | | 1996 | 243 | | 500 | |
| Saxony | Saxon Flood Helpers Order 2002 | | 2002 | | | | For helpers during the 2002 European floods |
| Saxony | Saxon Flood Helpers Order 2013 | | 2013 | | | | For helpers during the 2013 European floods |
| Saxony-Anhalt | Order of Merit of Saxony-Anhalt | | 2006 | | | 300 | |
| Schleswig-Holstein | Order of Merit of Schleswig-Holstein | | 2008 | | | 500 | |
| Thuringia | Order of Merit of the Free State of Thuringia | | 2000 | | | 300 | |

== State medals ==
=== Bavaria ===
- Bavarian Constitution Medal (until 2011)
- Bavarian Lifesaving Medal

=== Berlin ===
- Berlin Lifesaving Medal
- Louise-Schroeder-Medaille

=== Hamburg ===
- Bürgermeister-Stolten-Medaille
- Biermann-Ratjen-Medaille

=== Hesse ===
- Wilhelm-Leuschner-Medaille

=== Lower Saxony ===
- Niedersächsische Landesmedaille

=== Rhineland-Palatinate ===
- Verdienstmedaille des Landes Rheinland-Pfalz

=== Saxony ===
- Saxon Constitutional Medal
- Johann-Georg-Palitzsch-Medaille

== See also ==
- Orders, decorations, and medals of Germany
