= Assault course =

Trail that combines running and exercising

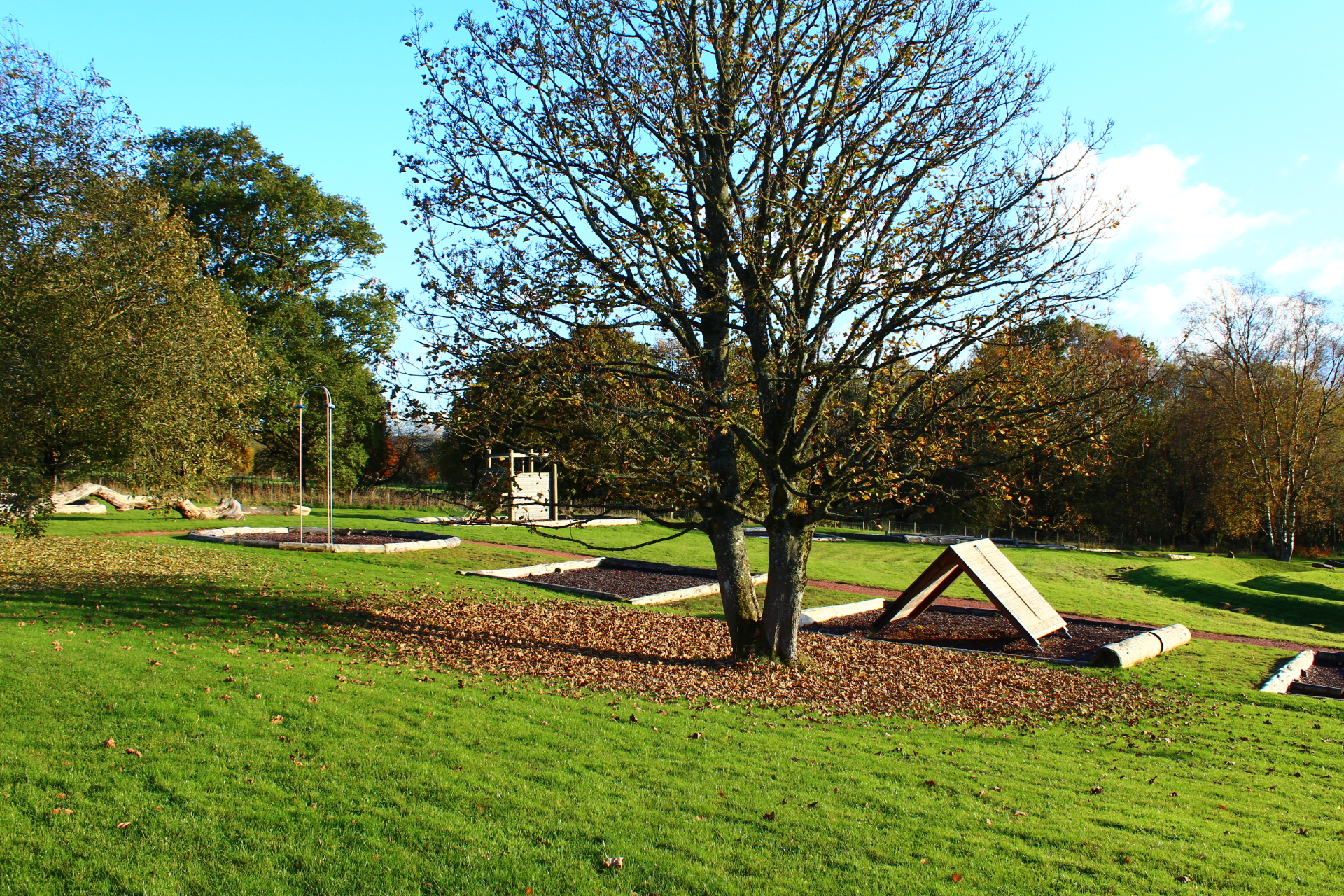
An assault course in a public park in Scotland

An assault course (also called a confidence course or obstacle course) is a trail (or course) that combines running and exercising. It is often used in military training. The prime use is to evaluate progress and weaknesses of the individual or the team involved.

There are specific urban obstacle courses and night obstacles Courses. An obstacle course race (OCR) is a civilian sporting and fitness challenge event which combines obstacles and cross country running.

== Military training ==
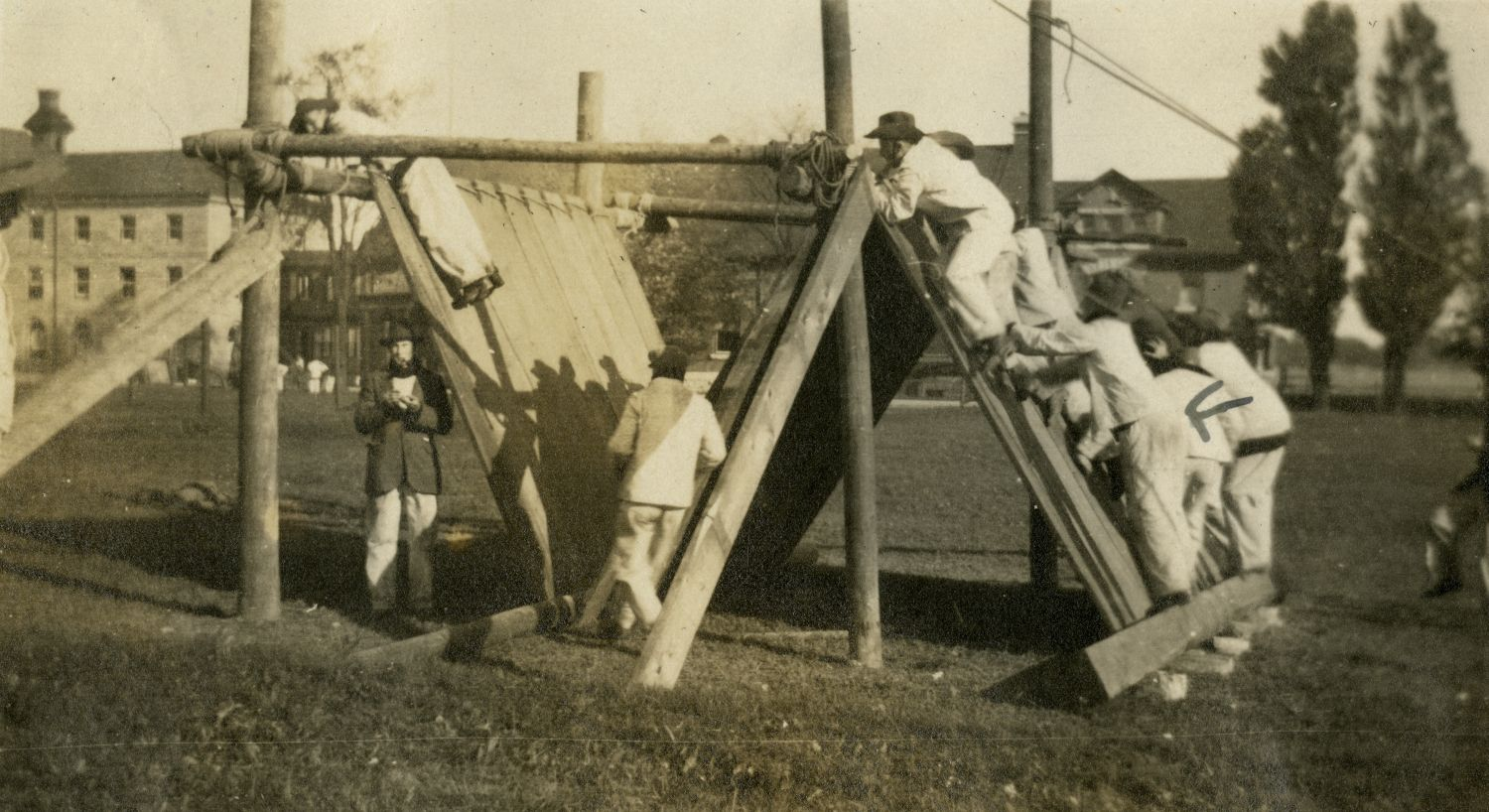
Military obstacle course in Canada c. 1917

Running, jumping, vaulting, climbing, and crawling are basic activities required of all soldiers. They are also excellent means for developing' endurance, agility, confidence, and self-reliance. Instruction and training in these basic activities are best conducted on an obstacle course.

Assault courses are used in military training to increase fitness, to demonstrate techniques that can be used for crossing obstacles, and to increase teamwork and self-confidence.

Military Assault Courses help develop:

- Physical Fitness: Strength; Stamina; Mobility.
- Technique: Such as how to climb over walls and lower oneself safely.
- Teamwork: Especially on obstacles that can only be crossed as a team such a high walls.
- Mental Ability: Overcoming challenges and fears by personal courage and determination.

Often military assault courses will be standardized and will have, for example (in the UK), a six-foot and a ten-foot wall, a climbing net, some type of bar to climb over, and a high rope or net that must be crossed (these being or representing the most likely difficult terrain that a soldier will come across). The standardization means that every course will be of the same quality, though it also means that there will be certain parts that may be familiar if practiced.

=== Purpose and types ===
Military training courses have different purposes. For example, they can be short (less than a minute) with a rifle range on the end (e.g. Junior Leaders, Folkestone), or long (five minutes) as at Thetford. This is partially because of space restraints and training objectives. The short one can be run as an individual course and a warmup for the range. The long Thetford course is more of an exercise in endurance and teamwork.

Individual obstacles can be for general fitness, or for quite specific tasks such as cargo nets that simulate soldiers climbing down nets from ships into landing craft for beachhead landings. Climbing through windows, over wall and up ladders are useful skills when operating in built-up areas. Kevin Yates, manager at Fitness First, notes that Monkey Bars are good for working: biceps; core; forearms; shoulders; chests; abs and obliques. A great exercise for building arms, grip strength and core power.

Common assault course obstacles include barbed wire or nets to crawl under, pipes or tunnels to crawl through, walls to climb over, beams, walls or planks to balance on, steps to climb up, walls with window size holes to climb through, and mazes to navigate. Overhead traverse (monkey) bars are popular.

The primary role of a military assault course is to improve fitness, they are also used for the assessment of personnel to see if they are suitable for a specific role. For example in the British Military potential paratroopers have to complete the British Army's Parachute Regiment's Trainasium, as one of the test, to be allowed to progress to Parachute Training, and the Royal Marine's Bottom Field Assault Course has to be completed as one of the test for the award of the Commando Green Beret. Both of these assault courses have obstacles which provide a physical and psychological challenge to those completing them, the Trainasium has a lot of high obstacles and Bottom Field include a lot of obstacles with water.

The German Army's Einzelkampferlehrgang (Individual Battle Course), a combat survival course, uses a timed assault course as one of its entry test. For the basic Einzelkampferlehrgang course it must be completed in 2 min 15 sec, and for the Advanced Course in 1 min 50 sec. German Army Paratroopers are required to complete a standard German Army Obstacle Course in 1 min 30 sec as part of Paratrooper Selection.

=== International Military Assault Courses ===
The Conseil International du Sport Militaire's (CISM) Military Pentathlon has five parts: Shooting; Obstacle Swimming; Grenade Throwing; Cross Country Running and an Obstacle Course.

The Obstacle Course is the signature event of the Military Pentathlon, and is 500 metres long with 20 standard obstacles: Rope ladder; Double beam; Trip wires; Crawl; Stepping-stones; Vault; Balance beam; Sloping wall with rope; Horizontal beams; Irish table; Tunnel and twin beams; Four steps; Ramp and ditch; Low wall; 2m deep Pit; Vertical ladder; High wall; Zigzag balance beam; Chicane; Three low walls close together. The women's competition omits the rope ladder, sloping wall with rope, four steps and vertical ladder.

International Naval Obstacle Course Competitions are similar and have additional naval type task such as closing and securing hatches. These competitions are run in sports clothing, and can be individual or team events with each team member covering a section of the course. The Military Pentathalon Obstacle Course are completed in around 2 minutes. The CISM Obstacle Course design is used by many armed forces around the world.

=== China ===
The Chinese People's Liberation Army has a standard Assault Course Test which is 400m long and the soldier negotiates 16 obstacles. The Assault Course is 100m long with 8 obstacles. The Test starts with a 100m run along the side of the Assault Course and then turn about. Then:

1. cross the stepping stones using only 3 in one row
2. leap across a 2m wide, 2m deep vertical sided trench
3. climb over a 1.1m high wall
4. climb onto a 1.8m high platform, cross over on to two other lower platforms to
5. move along the top of a horizontal ladder
6. traverse the balance beam
7. climb over the high wall
8. crawl under six tripwires, then turn around
9. step over six tripwires
10. climb over the high wall
11. weave in and out of the 4 support post for the balance beam
12. swing under the horizontal ladder
13. cross two platforms to the 1.8m high platform and jump down
14. climb through a 0.5m wide and 0.4m high hole in the low wall
15. climb into the 2m wide 2m deep trench and out the other side
16. cross all 5 stepping stones, then turn around and sprint the final 100m to the start/finish

The standard for under 24 year olds is 2 minutes and 35 seconds, with 2 minutes 20 seconds being good and 2 minutes 5 seconds being excellent. The 400m obstacle course is considered by Chinese soldiers to be harder than a 5 km run, or a 5 km speed march with 10 kg. Artillery NCOs Zhang Heng and Li Xiaohoi have both achieved a time of 1 minute 23 seconds.

=== France ===
The standard French military assault course is 500m long and has the following 20 obstacles:

1. 5m high Rope Ladder
2. Double Beam 1 and 1.4m high
3. 6 Trip Wires 0.6m high 2m apart
4. 20m long Low Crawl under 0.5m
5. 5 Stepping Stones
6. 3 Bar Vault 2.3m high
7. Balance Beam 1m high and 8.5m long
8. 5m high Vertical Ladder
9. Over and Under Beams 1.2m and 0.7m high
10. 2m high Irish Table
11. 0.8m high Low vault
12. 0.5m deep ditch
13. Ramp and Ditch
14. 1m Low wall
15. 0.7m deep ditch a 1.5 High Bund and a 0.7m Ditch
16. 2m High Wall
17. 2.2m deep Pit
18. 4m high Climbing Wall
19. 8m long Chicane
20. 3 Trenches the first narrow and 0.85 deep, the second 4m wide and 1.1m deep, the third narrow and 0.85 deep.

Many of the obstacle are similar to those on the CISM (International Military Sports Council) obstacle course used for Military Pentathlon such as the Irish Table which is a plank 2m above the ground which requires both technique and strength to overcome. The 4m high climbing wall is particular to French assault courses and also requires good technique to climb. To be a sergeant you have to complete the course in 3'15"

=== Germany ===
The German Armed Forces' Obstacle Course, Hindernisbahn-Bundeswehr, is 250m long and has 12 obstacles: an 'Erdwall' an earthwall or barricade of logs about .6m high; a log on 1.3m high metal post to roll over; 7 log steps to a height of 2.5m; 6 X shapes to climb over – like the US Army's Tough Nut; 2 bar vault, the first bar .5m high, the second bar is .3m further and .8 m high; 2m high wooden wall; .5m vault, with a .5m deep ditch on the far side; balance log over a wide ditch; low wires to crawl under; trip wires to step over; a 1.8m deep and 1.8m wide trench to climb in and out of; a fox hole from which dummy grenades are then thrown at targets.

The German Democratic Republic's standard Sturmbahn (storm course) was 200m long and had the following obstacles:

1. 20m of 10 thigh high bars to step over or 6 concrete-semi circles to crawl under.
2. Ditch 2 m wide.
3. Climb a 3m rope to a 15-20m long horizontal rope and then climb down.
4. Climb a 2 m wall.
5. Climb onto the side of a pipe, jump onto a small platform, and then onto the side of another pipe.
6. A 10m tunnel accessed by a short vertical shafts.
7. Two trenches, divided by a fence. Jump over the first trench onto the foundation of the fence, climbed over the fence and jump over the second section of the trench.
8. Gable wall with upper and lower window with a rope. Then cross a plank, jump onto a 3 m high concrete platform, then a 1.5 m high concrete platform.
9. Seesaw
10. Climb into a foxhole, throw hand grenade, put on a gas mask and run back to the start of the Sturmbahn.

=== India ===
India's National Cadet Corps is a Tri-Service Military Youth Organization with cadet units at schools, colleges and universities. It has a standard Obstacle Course pattern consisting of 10 obstacles about 30 foot apart. The obstacles are suitable for cadets of a wide age range and are:

1. Straight Balance - a 12' long 4" wide balance beam, 1.5' above the ground.
2. Clear Jump – a 2' bar to be cleared in one clear jump.
3. Zig-Zag balance – an 18' long 3" wide 3 zig-zag beam starting at 1.5' high and rising to 3.5'.
4. High wall – 6' high brick wall
5. Double Ditch – 2 ditches about 6' wide and about 4' apart.
6. Right hand vault – a 3.5' high bar which is vaulted supported by the right hand on the bar.
7. Left hand vault – a 3.5' high bar which is vaulted supported by the left hand on the bar.
8. Gate vault – a 2 bar vault with the first bar at 3' and the top bar at 5'.
9. Ramp - up to 4.5'.
10. Straight Balance again.

=== Israel ===
Course is undertaken wearing webbing, a helmet and carrying a weapon. The course consists of a 500m dash, then 14 obstacles:

1. 1.8m Wall.
2. ‘Arm-walk’ along Parallel Bars, 3m long and 1.6m above the ground.
3. Low beam (1 Ft approximately) to jump over
4. 10 Tires to cross,
5. Overhand Traverse (Monkey Bars) 2.5m high, 4.4m long, 12 rungs 40 cm apart,
6. Bar and ditch
7. high bar – over waste high
8. 3m high Rope Climb,
9. Low Move - under a net on hands and knees,
10. Stepping Stones, set 1.1m apart,
11. Balance beam, diagonal up, horizontal gap, horizontal
12. Through a representative window, 1m above ground and 1m square
13. Pyramid Climb, 3m high and 5.5m long. 10 logs on each side including the top log
14. Low Crawl 10m

and a final sprint. The course is to be completed in under 10min 30 sec.

In 2017 there were complaints about the wall obstacle being unfair either because there was a lower level for female participants or because there was not.

=== The Netherlands ===
As well as using the CISM course design, The Netherlands' Armed Forces have the Standaardhindernisbaan (Koninklijke Landmacht), Standard Obstacle Course (Royal Netherlands Army), which has 15 obstacles over 250 metres:

1. 5m high rope ladder.
2. 5 trip wires, 2m apart, 0.55m high.
3. 20m low crawl, lanes 0.5m high and 1m wide.
4. 9m long balance beam, 0.25m wide, 0.5m above ground or over a pit.
5. 3.5m wall with 1x1m windows, 1.4m above ground.
6. 4 Horizontal beams, 1m apart, over 1.2m high, under 0.6m high, over, under.
7. Irish table, 2m high plank to climb over.
8. 10m long 1m diameter pipe with black rubber flaps over far end.
9. 3m high steel climbing frame with sloping section and a horizontal section.
10. 1.4m wide ditch and a 2.75m high sloping wall, with a rope.
11. 4.5m Vertical steel climbing frame with 6 horizontal bars 0.75m apart.
12. 1.75m high concrete wall.
13. 5 steppingstones, 20 cm diameter, 1,25m apart, 15 cm high.
14. 2m deep 4m wide pit.
15. 3 x 2.4m wide ditches 2.4m apart, 0.5m deep, 0.8m deep, and 0.5m deep.

The Standards Obstacle Course have up to 4 lanes, and are adjusted to fit available space. Females and Males over age 51 do not have to undertake obstacle 9 and 10. Females can use a step 60 – 80 cm high for obstacles 7 and 14.

=== Russia ===
Russian Federation Army Assault Courses usually have: a chicane; walls with holes to crawl through; widely spaced steps representing a broken staircase; balance beams representing a broken bridge; tunnels and often include throwing a dummy hand grenade from the final trench. Russian Assault Courses' often have monkey bars in an inverted V shape, higher in the middle. The basic ‘All Arms’ Obstacle Course is 100m long and consist of 7 obstacles

1. Ditch 1m deep, varying width of 2, 2.5 and 3metre
2. Labyrinth, a chicane, 6m long 2m wide 1,1m high, .5m passages which switches direction ten times.
3. Wall 2m high, 3m wide, with an inclined beam between .25m to .3m wide, at 40 degrees from the horizontal.
4. Destroyed Bridge .2m wide beams 2m above ground on metal post. The first is 2m long attached to the wall, the next two are 3.5m long with gaps of 1m and changes of direction
5. Destroyed Stairs 2m wide beams 1.2m apart, height .8, 1.2, 1.5 and 1.8m
6. Low wall with holes. 1.1m high 2.6m wide, 0.4m thick, with two holes, 1m wide and 0.4m high at ground level, and 0.5 x 0.6m .35m above ground level.
7. 10m tunnel to ditch

Motorized Rifle Unit obstacle courses are 200m long and have additional obstacles, before the Basic Course they have:

1. Ditch
2. Balance Beam over pit with a hand guideline
3. Barbed wire 0.3m above ground to crawl under for 3 meters.
4. The Obstruction obstacle, 8m long, nine 0.12-0.15 diameter poles or logs, between 0.4 and 1.2m above the ground some are diagonal.

After the basic course there are 3 more obstacles.

1. Palisade of a ditch, fence, ditch
2. Building Façade with windows 2 and 3.5m high and platforms on the far side
3. Trench

The obstacle course used by the Strategic Rocket Force units is 100m long, and is the Basic Obstacle Course with the addition of a simulated Rocket section and a catwalk.

=== Singapore ===
The Republic of Singapore Army's Standard Obstacle Course (SOC) dates from 1967, in 2010, the SOC was redesigned to provide realistic obstacles which may be found in either the jungle or urban battlefield. 6 old obstacles were removed (including the Monkey Bars which were known on the SOC as the Swing Trainer) and 7 new obstacles added. The new SOC has 12 obstacles: Low wall, stepping stones, rubble, tunnels, dodging panels, low rope climb, ditch, corridor, balance bridge, window, apex ladder, and terrace.

=== Switzerland ===
The Swiss military assault course has 10 obstacles, the obstacles are similar to the CISM design: a double beam; a long crawl; a pit; stepping stones; a 3-bar vault; a zigzag balance beam; 2 sets of over under bars; 4 steps; and a 3 m high ramp with rope. Whilst ideally 250m long, the course can be between 150m and 300m long dependent on available space.

=== United States ===
The United States Army has two classifications of Obstacle Course: Confidence Obstacle Course and Conditioning Course. The Confidence Obstacle Course has 22 standard obstacle designs which give soldiers confidence in their abilities and are not to be run against time. Conditioning Courses have low obstacles, are 300 to 450 yards long, contain 15 to 25 obstacles, 20 to 30 yards apart and are run against time, and are used to maintain and improve fitness.

Noteworthy US Army Obstacle Courses are:

- Air Assault School Obstacle Course. This obstacle course uses 9 standard Confidence Obstacle Course obstacles: Tough One, Confidence Climb, Six Vaults, Inclined Wall, Low Belly Over, Swing Stop Jump, Low Crawl, High Step Over, The Weaver. The Tough One is 34-foot-high, the Confidence Climb is a tall vertical ‘ladder' requiring candidates to stretch for each rung. The Six Vaults are 4-foot-high and are to be crossed without the feet touching the vault. Prospective Air Assault soldiers must compete the two specific obstacles: Tough One, and the Confidence Climb and 6 of the other 7 obstacles.
- US Rangers - Darby Queen - Camp Darby, Fort Benning, South Georgia, 20 Obstacles set over 1 mile of wooded hilly terrain. Aspiring Ranger soldiers complete the course in pairs, but can only work as a pair on the 30-foot high ‘Skyscraper' obstacle. The course also includes The Weaver, and many rope obstacles.
- US Special Forces - Nasty Nick - Camp Mackall, North Carolina, 25 Obstacles over 2 miles, SF soldiers have to complete the course as an individual. The obstacles are noted as needing a lot of upper body strength, the obstacles also include a long tunnel crawl, and many other obstacles are high, designed to provide a psychological challenge.

==== United States Marine Corps ====
The USMC standard course has 14 obstacles and is 300 foot long. It starts with a low log hurdle 2 ½ to 3 foot high, then an 8 ft bar to be climbed over, another low hurdle, the combination which consist of traversing 12 foot long 2-inch diameter metal pipes, then walking a 12-foot log to a high roll over log. Then another low hurdle, a wall, another low hurdle, a 5 ½ foot high log, another low hurdle, four logs 4 feet apart and 4 1/2 foot high, another low hurdle, double pull over bar, the lower bar is 8 feet above the ground the second a foot higher, then another low hurdle. The course finishes with a 20-foot-high rope climb. The course is also used by non-USMC military units. The USMC also used other Assault Courses designs, including a CISM obstacle course at Parris Island.

=== Taiwan ===
The Taiwan Army's standard obstacle course is 500m long, the maximum time allowed is 4min 30, 2min 30 achieves a maximum score. Women are not required to complete the pole climb and high wall. It has the following obstacles:

1. Two vaults, 90 cm high and 110 cm.
2. 5.4m Pole climb.
3. High Wall 2.2m.
4. The jumping platform - this is 7 steps to 2.4m.
5. Ditch, about 1.2m deep with vertical revetment near side and sloping from the bottom to ground level on the far side, must clear 1.75m.
6. 20 cm diameter balance log over a 10m pit.
7. 10m crawl under Barbed Wire, 45 cm above ground.

=== United Kingdom ===
The British Army has two standard designs. Type A, for trained soldiers and Type B, for training establishments.

Type A
is the design for trained soldiers has 18 different obstacles, and is usually wide enough to allow two teams to compete. The design includes: 4 steps up to 1.7m; monkey bars 5.4m long and 2.8m high; stepping-stones; 5.8m high cargo net; 10m long pipe crawl; rope swing over a 6.7m wide ditch; 4m high OBUA (Operations in Built Up Area) double wall with ladders up and between the walls with window openings; and 8m high climbing ropes.
Type B
is the design for British Army training establishments has 9 different obstacles. Most obstacles are built with 3 levels of difficulty: the vault has heights of 1.2m, 1.5m, and 2m; the high wall has heights of 2.1m, 2.5m and 3m; this allows the recruit to progress form easier to more challenging versions of the same obstacle as they progress through their training. The design also includes ramps; ditches wet and dry; ropes and ladders to climb up 4.8m and then cross a rope or a rope bridge 7.3m long; and a 5m long maze. The maze is one of the newer obstacles and replaced a low knee high bar which could be either vaulted over or crawled under.

Both British designs are adjusted to fit the available space and terrain features, obstacles are built between 5 and 10 yards apart, not all obstacles are always used, and obstacles from Type A (Trained soldiers) may be used in a course at a Training Camp, for example the Assault Course used by British Army recruits at Pirbright has 10 obstacles, including a maze, 2 dry ditches and a cargo net, whilst the Assault Course at Worthy Down Camp has only 8 obstacles. The Royal Air Force uses the British Army designs, and has Assault Courses at RAF Honington, RAF Halton, and the Royal Air Force College at RAF Cranwell. HMS Collingwood, a Royal Navy, shore establishment has an Assault Course with suitable naval themed obstacles, it has water obstacles which are crossed with ropes and pulleys, as well as a wall to climb over and pipes, on a slope, to crawl up. HMS Raleigh (another RN shore establishment) also has an Assault Course.

== Trim trail ==
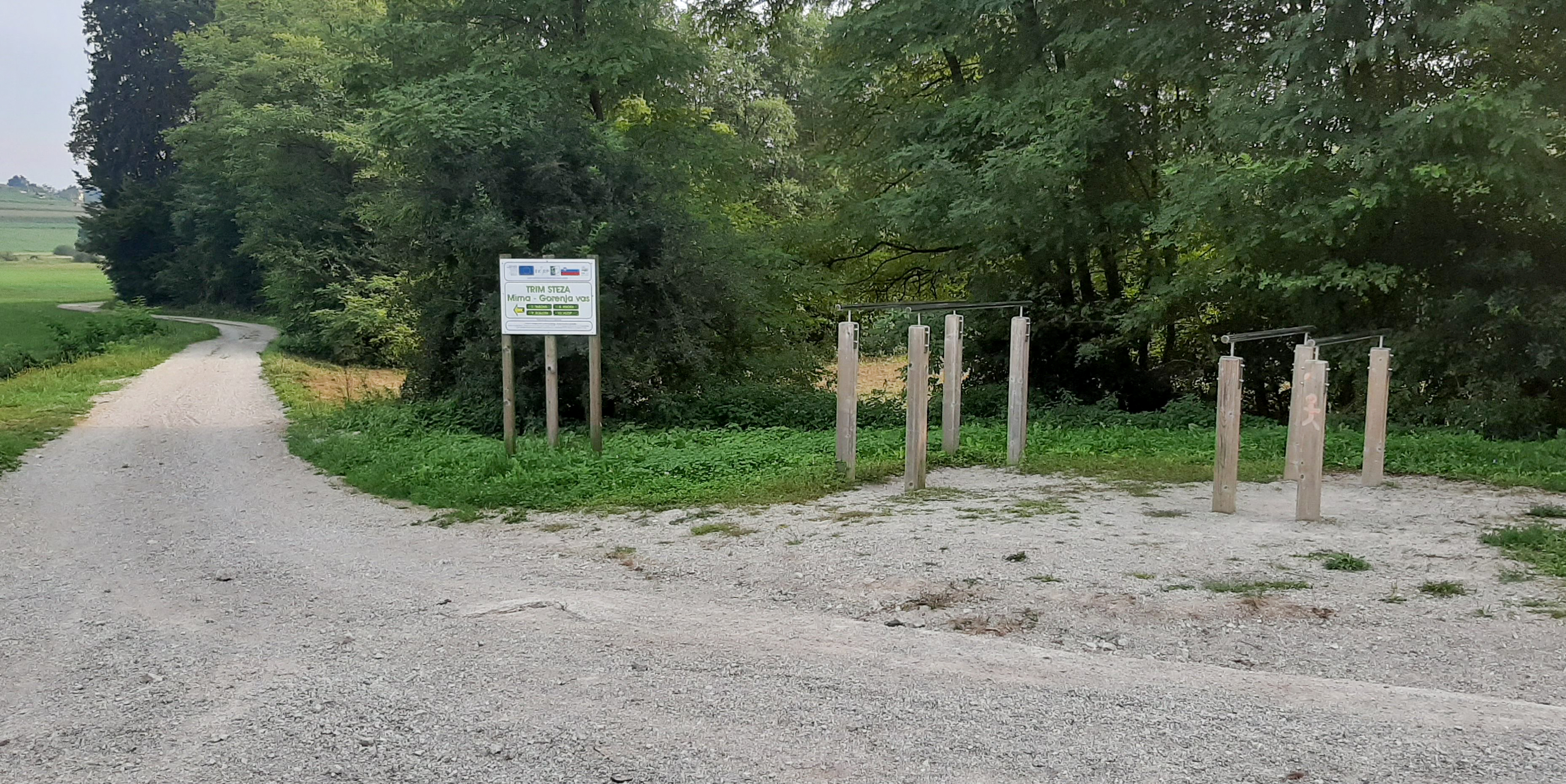
Trim trail station in Mirna, Slovenia

The term "trim trail" has also been applied to a series of wooden exercise stations, scattered in parkland or other locations beside a jogging or walking trail, which can be used to develop balance, strength and coordination. They are suitable for both adults and children, and the individual stations have been scientifically designed to provide a range of exercises. A key difference between a Trim Trail and an Assault Course is that on a Trim Trail at each exercise station the exercise is usually repeated multiple times as an exercise set, on an Assault Course the obstacle is only crossed once.

== See also ==
- Obstacle course
- Fitness trail
