= Claus C. Hilgetag =

German neuroscientist & researcher

Claus-Christian Hilgetag
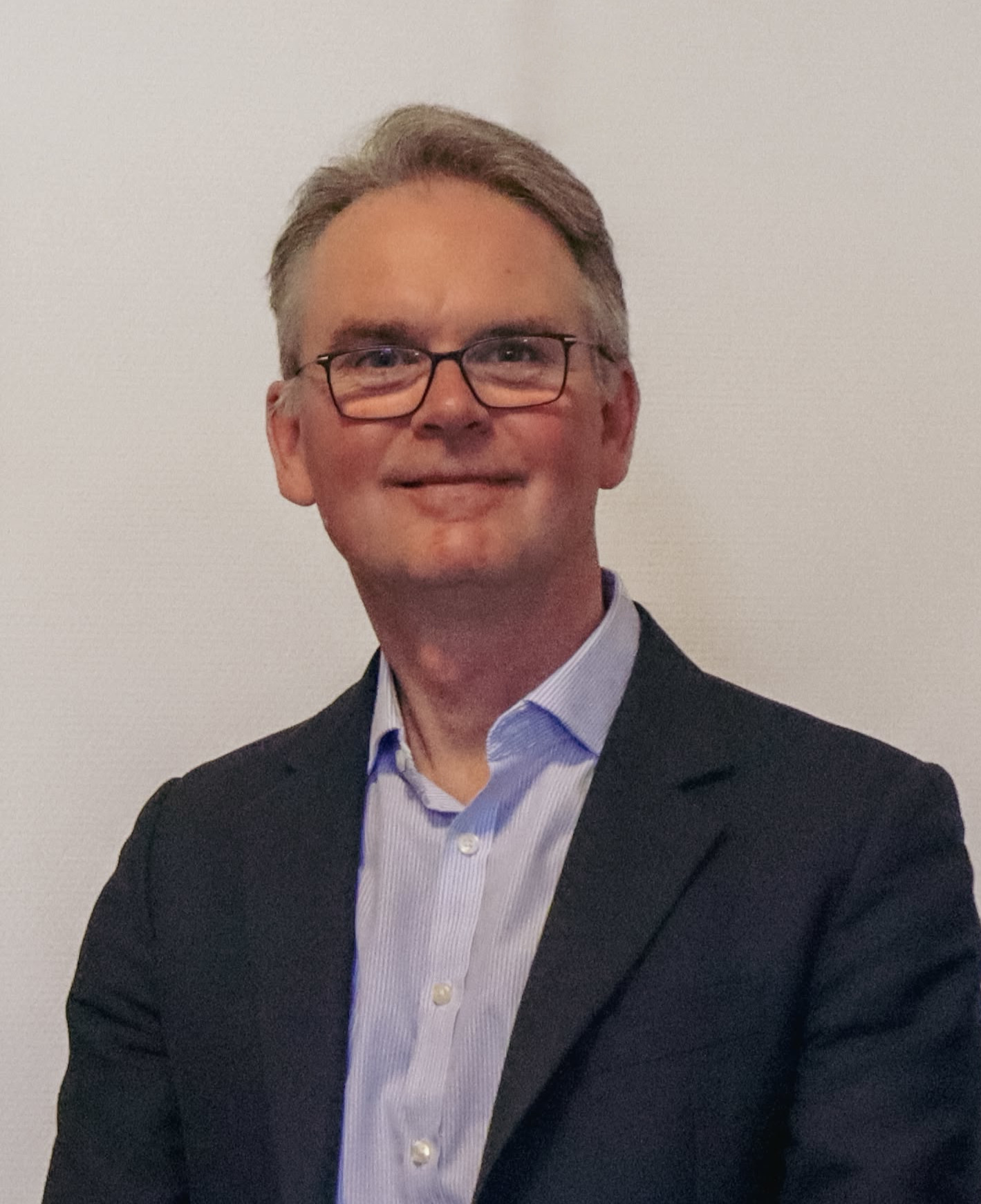
- Claus C. Hilgetag in 2025
- Born: 1969 (age 56–57)
- Education: Humboldt University of Berlin (Diplom, 1994); Newcastle University (PhD, 1999)
- Known for: Connectomics, cortical connectivity, network neuroscience
- Scientific career
- Fields: Computational neuroscience, Network neuroscience, Connectomics
- Workplaces: University Medical Center Hamburg-Eppendorf; Jacobs University Bremen; Boston University

Claus-Christian Hilgetag (born 1969 in Berlin) is a German neuroscientist whose research focuses on computational neuroscience, connectomics, and network neuroscience. His work has contributed to the emergence of network neuroscience as an interdisciplinary field integrating graph theory, neuroanatomy, and computational modelling. He is a Professor and Director of the Institute of Computational Neuroscience at the University Medical Center Hamburg-Eppendorf.

His research investigates the organization, development, and function of brain networks, particularly the structural architecture of the cerebral connectome. Much of his research has examined the anatomical wiring of the primate cerebral cortex, in general, and visual pathways, in particular, using large-scale connectivity datasets. His research has contributed to the understanding of cortical organization, network topology, and the principles governing brain connectivity. He has also contributed to discussions of influential concepts in network neuroscience, including small-world organization and cortical hierarchy, proposing more nuanced and biologically grounded interpretations of these concepts.

== Early life and education ==
Claus C. Hilgetag studied biophysics at Humboldt University of Berlin, where he earned a Diplom (equivalent to a master's degree) in 1994. His early work contributed to the development of elementary flux mode analysis for biochemical reaction systems.

He subsequently pursued doctoral studies in computational neuroscience at Newcastle University, completing his PhD in 1999. During his doctoral research, he developed mathematical approaches for analyzing brain connectivity and the organization of cortical systems.

== Career and research ==
Following his PhD, Hilgetag was a postdoctoral fellow at Boston University as a Wellcome Trust International Fellow, where his research included the study of paradoxical lesion effects using reversible brain perturbation in the human brain. Inspired by the work of the neuroanatomist Helen Barbas of Boston University, he also began investigating relationships between laminar organization, cytoarchitecture, and cortical connectivity profiles. Since then, Hilgetag collaborated extensively with Helen Barbas on how cortical cytoarchitecture shapes long-range connections in the primate brain. Their work contributed to the "architectonic type principle," which holds that features of cortico-cortical connections, such as the layers in which axons originate and terminate, vary systematically with the laminar structure of the areas involved. They also supported the hypothesis that mechanical tension from corticocortical fiber tracts contributes to cortical folding patterns. Their collaboration culminated in a synthesis paper on connection principles of the primate visual connectome.

In 2001, he joined International University Bremen, later renamed Jacobs University Bremen and now Constructor University, where he established a research group in computational neuroscience. His research there examined how anatomical constraints shape the organization and efficiency of neural systems and the relationship between anatomical and topological organization.

Since 2011, he has been a Professor at the University Medical Center Hamburg-Eppendorf, where he directs the Institute of Computational Neuroscience. His research has examined the organization, development, and function of large-scale brain networks, including hierarchical organization, structure–function relationships, and computational models of neural dynamics.

== Scientific impact ==
Hilgetag's research has contributed to the study of connectomics and network neuroscience, particularly in the areas of cortical architecture, hierarchical organization, and the relationship between anatomical structure and functional dynamics.

== Professional service and affiliations ==
Hilgetag has served on the editorial boards of several scientific journals, including Philosophical Transactions of the Royal Society B, PLOS Computational Biology, PLOS Biology, and Network Neuroscience.

He is a principal investigator and steering committee member of the German Research Foundation (DFG) Priority Programme Computational Connectomics (SPP 2041).

He is also affiliated with the Bernstein Network for Computational Neuroscience through the Bernstein Node Hamburg.

== Honors ==
Hilgetag was elected a member of the Academy of Sciences and Humanities in Hamburg in 2015.

== Selected publications ==
- Hilgetag, Claus C.; O'Neill, Mark.; Young, Malcolm P. (1996). "Indeterminate organization of the visual system". Science. 271 (5250): 776–777. Bibcode:1996Sci...271..776H. doi:10.1126/science.271.5250.776. PMID 8628990.
- Hilgetag, Claus C.; Théoret, Hugo; Pascual-Leone, Alvaro (2001). "Enhanced visual spatial attention ipsilateral to rTMS-induced 'virtual lesions' of human parietal cortex". Nature Neuroscience. 4 (9): 953–957. doi:10.1038/nn0901-953. PMID 11528429.
- Sporns, Olaf; Chialvo, Dante R.; Kaiser, Marcus; Hilgetag, Claus C. (2004). "Organization, development and function of complex brain networks". Trends in Cognitive Sciences. 8 (9): 418–425. doi:10.1016/j.tics.2004.07.008. PMID 15350243.
- Ghashghaei, H. T.; Hilgetag, Claus C.; Barbas, Helen (2007). "Sequence of information processing for emotions based on the anatomic dialogue between prefrontal cortex and amygdala". NeuroImage. 34 (3): 905–923. doi:10.1016/j.neuroimage.2006.09.046. PMC 2045074. PMID 17126037.
- Kaiser, Marcus; Hilgetag, Claus C. (2006). "Nonoptimal Component Placement, but Short Processing Paths, due to Long-Distance Projections in Neural Systems". PLOS Computational Biology. 2 (7) e95. Bibcode:2006PLSCB...2...95K. doi:10.1371/journal.pcbi.0020095. PMC 1513269. PMID 16848638.
- Zhou, Changsong; Zemanová, Lucilla; Zamora, Galo; Hilgetag, Claus C.; Kurths, Jürgen (2006). "Hierarchical organization unveiled by functional connectivity in complex brain networks". Physical Review Letters. 97 (23) 238103. Bibcode:2006PhRvL..97w8103Z. doi:10.1103/PhysRevLett.97.238103. PMID 17280310.
- Messé, Arnaud; Hütt, Marc-Thorsten; König, Peter; Hilgetag, Claus C. (2015). "A closer look at the apparent correlation of structural and functional connectivity in excitable neural networks". Scientific Reports. 5 (1): 7870. Bibcode:2015NatSR...5.7870M. doi:10.1038/srep07870. PMC 4290753. PMID 25598302.
