= Cultural Heritage Response Unit =

The Cultural Heritage Response Unit (CHRU) is a specialized German international deployment unit for the emergency response to threatened or damaged cultural heritage in the event of disasters. It was developed within the KulturGutRetter (KGR) project and has been officially registered since the end of February 2026 in the European Civil Protection Mechanism (UCPM). It is thus the first operational European unit of its kind.

== International integration ==
The CHRU is one of the first modules within the EU Civil Protection Mechanism specifically focused on the protection of cultural heritage. In the event of a disaster, natural catastrophe, or human-induced crisis, the unit can be deployed following an international request for assistance. Once the affected country accepts the offer, deployment is carried out according to EU standards, usually within 96 hours. Operations typically begin only after immediate life-saving measures have been completed. Activities on site are conducted in close coordination with local authorities. After the completion of initial measures, both the secured cultural objects and the collected data are to be handed over to the responsible institutions in the affected country.

== KulturGutRetter ==
The CHRU was created within the KulturGutRetter project (literally "cultural heritage rescuer"), which has been under development since 2019. Participating organizations include the Federal Agency for Technical Relief (THW), the German Archaeological Institute (DAI), and the Leibniz Centre for Archaeology (LEIZA). The project combines expertise in international disaster relief, logistics, heritage conservation, restoration, and data management. It is funded by the German Federal Foreign Office and supported by the German Bundestag.

== Scope of operations ==
The CHRU brings together experts from civil protection and cultural heritage protection. During missions, the following tasks are among those carried out:

- Remote sensing and damage assessment
- Documentation of cultural heritage
- Evacuation of endangered objects
- Emergency conservation and stabilization
- Securing sites and structures

The project and the unit rely on digital methods, standardized procedures, and specialized logistics in international crisis deployments. Prior to deployment, remote sensing data, photographs, and plans are collected and analyzed. During operations, specialists can record large amounts of data using digital applications to systematically document cultural heritage and assess damage. Open-source applications such as iDAI.field and QField are continuously further developed for this purpose. In parallel, digital workflows and IT infrastructures have been developed to capture operational data and make it usable for research and documentation.

Operational planning and logistics also play a key role. In cooperation with the THW, concepts for transport, infrastructure, personnel, and coordination have been developed. This includes the rapid deployment of personnel and materials, as well as the provision of basic infrastructure at the site, such as electricity, water, and communication systems. The THW draws on its experience in international missions and a broad network of volunteers.

== Equipment ==
At full capacity, the CHRU comprises a team of 43 personnel and approximately 18 tonnes of equipment. The unit is designed for operations lasting at least ten days and can operate largely autonomously. Its equipment is optimized for mobility and can be stored in transportable aluminum boxes. It includes specialized materials and systems for the protection of immovable cultural heritage (e.g., historic buildings and monuments), including cleaning, decontamination, and stabilization, as well as movable cultural heritage (e.g., collections and archives), supported by a mobile emergency laboratory.

For immovable heritage, operational standards have been defined for documentation, protection, stabilization, recovery, and storage. In parallel, a mobile, modular rescue laboratory for movable heritage has been developed, which can be transported by air to crisis areas. This laboratory enables serial initial treatment of objects at specialized stations, for example for photographic documentation, dry and wet cleaning, and packaging. Additionally, scientifically based standard procedures and workflows have been established. The mobile emergency laboratory was developed by LEIZA and is used for the initial treatment and conservation of damaged objects on site.

== Training and exercises ==
A key component of the CHRU is a multi-level training program that includes practical exercises, testing, and the development of minimum standards. These standards regulate, among other aspects, the handling of different material types and operational procedures. The first full-scale exercise took place in September 2024. Due to a partnership with the EU-funded heritage management initiative ProCultHer, one of the first participations in an international exercise could take place with a core team (skeleton crew) as part of an EU-funded Module Exercise (ModEx) in October 2024 in Venice, Italy.

== Further development ==
The official registration of the CHRU is considered an important step toward the institutionalization of cultural heritage protection in disaster management. The unit is to be further expanded in the coming years and certified within the EU Civil Protection Mechanism. Furthermore, it is planned to share the experience gained from the development and deployment of the CHRU internationally. This may allow the unit to serve as a model for similar initiatives in other countries and contribute to the advancement of international cultural heritage protection.
