= Awards and decorations of the German Armed Forces =

German military awards since 1949

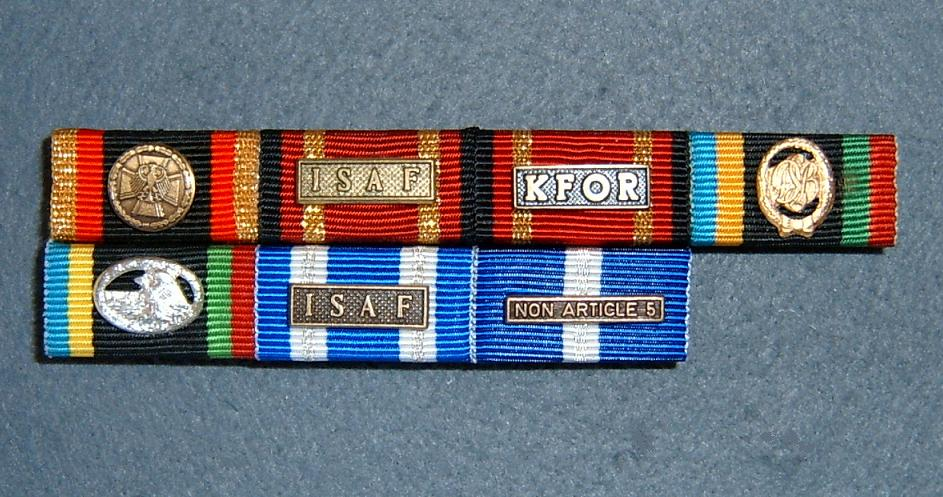
Ribbon bar with seven ribbons

The Awards and decorations of the German Armed Forces are decorations awarded by the German Bundeswehr, the German government, and other organizations to the German military and allied forces. Modern era German military awards have been presented since the establishment of the Federal Republic of Germany in 1949.

== History ==
The history of modern German Armed Forces awards may be divided into three distinct eras, namely post-World War II, Cold War era, and modern day.

=== Post World War II ===
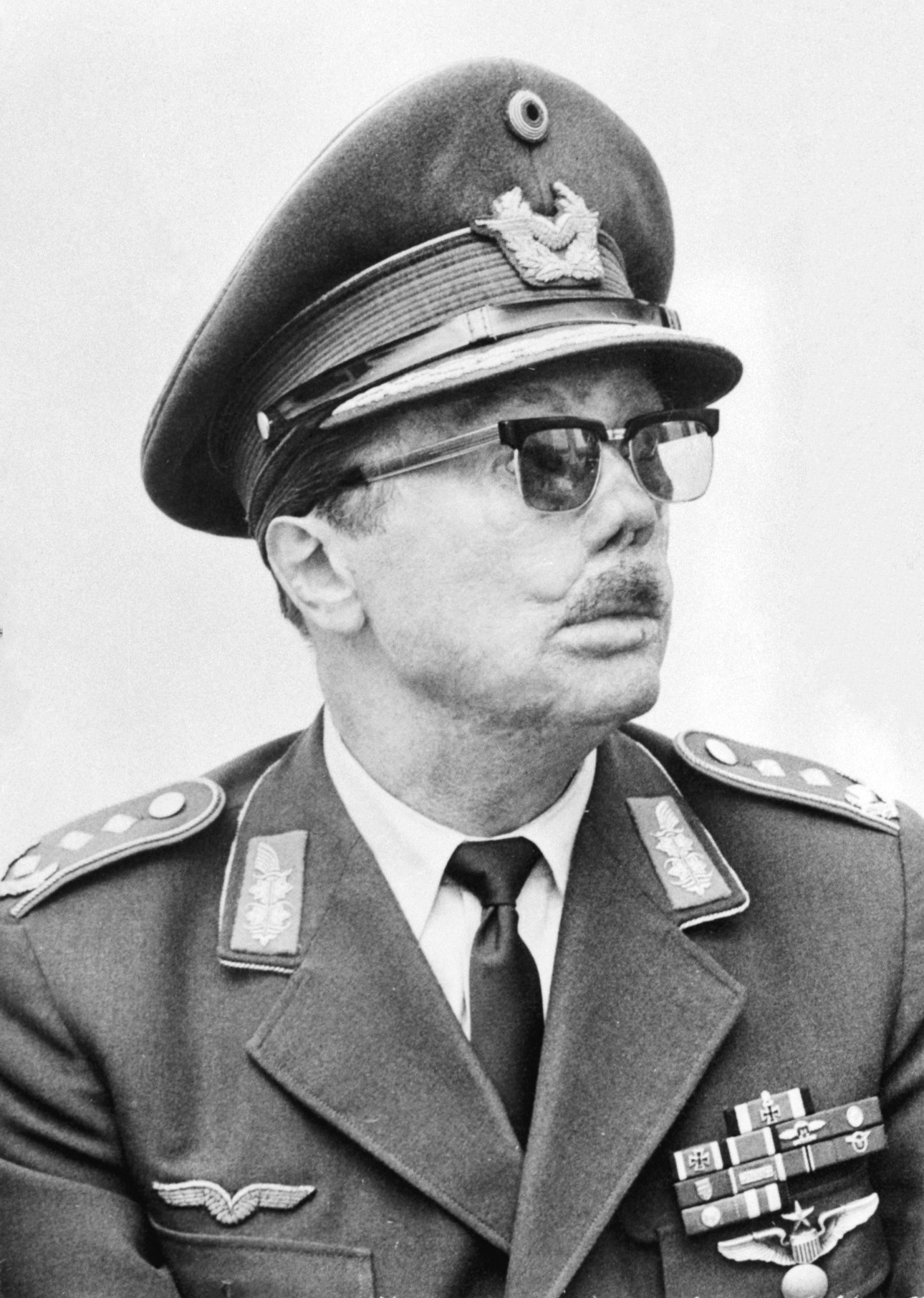
Johannes Steinhoff wearing several denazified decorations from the Second World War.

At the end of the Second World War, the wear of all Nazi era decorations was prohibited. When Germany divided in two, East Germany continued to ban such awards. However, from 1957 West German regulations permitted the wear of many wartime awards in Bundeswehr uniform, provided the swastika symbol was removed. This led to the re-design of many awards with, for example, the swastika being replaced by a three-leafed oakleaf cluster on the Iron Cross. Neck decorations and pin-back badges were now worn in Bundeswehr uniform on the ribbon bar. Those decorations that did not have a ribbon were displayed by a small replica of the award on a field grey ribbon.

Nazi political awards, those directly associated with the SA or SS, as well as occupation service medals relating to the expansion of Nazi Germany in the 1930s, continued to be forbidden and could not be worn.

=== Cold War Era ===
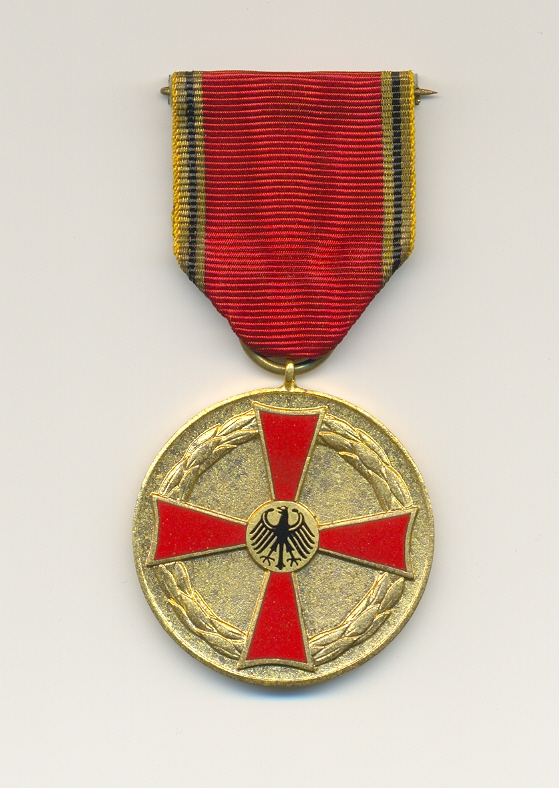
Medal of Merit (Order of Merit)

During the 1960s, West Germany became a key NATO member, serving as a major base for forward deployed United States and allied forces along the border with the Eastern Bloc. During this time, the West German government began to introduce new military awards and decorations, most of them for non-combat meritorious service.

Chief among these was the Order of Merit, the principal order of Germany. Civil relief medals were also introduced into the German armed forces, beginning in 1962 with the first in series of Flood Relief Medals.

By the 1970s, German personnel were also eligible to receive foreign awards, most notable awards and decorations of the United States military. During the 1980s, the NATO Medal and United Nations Medal were also frequently awarded to German personnel.

=== Modern Day Awards ===
In the modern German armed forces, several combat service medals exist to reflect German deployment in overseas missions in the war on terror and NATO-United Nations Peacekeeping ventures. German personnel are also eligible to receive and wear civil service medals, sports and fitness awards, and certain marksmanship awards.

The reunification of Germany saw new regulations concerning the status of East German awards introduced into the German military. These regulations typically stipulated that awards associated with the Communist regime were prohibited from display, but did recognize the status and continued wear of certain non-political service medals.

== List of German awards ==
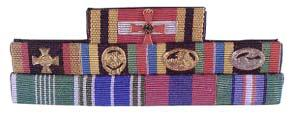
Sample of a Modern era German ribbon bar. The two leftmost ribbons on the bottom row are the U.S. Army's Commendation and Achievement Medals.

=== Decorations awarded by the president of the Federal Republic of Germany ===
- German Order of Merit
- Eichendorff-Plakette
- Grubenwehr-Ehrenzeichen (Mine rescue service badge of honor)
- Pro-Musica-Plakette
- Silbermedaille für den Behindertensport (silver medal for the disabled sports)
- Silbernes Lorbeerblatt
- Sportplakette des Bundespräsidenten (sports plaque of the federal president)
- Zelter-Plakette

=== Decorations awarded by the Federal Minister of Defence ===
- Bundeswehr Cross of Honour for Valour
- Badge of Honour of the Bundeswehr
- Combat Action Medal of the Bundeswehr
- German Armed Forces Deployment Medal

=== Decorations awarded by the Federal Minister of Interior ===
- Decoration of the German Federal Agency for Technical Relief
- Afghanistan-Spange

Ribbon of the 2002 Flood

=== Decorations awarded by the Federal Ministers of Interior and Defence ===
- German Flood Service Medal (2002) – Service in the 2002 German Floods
- German Flood Service Medal (2013) – Service in the 2013 European floods

=== Authorized Second World War Decorations ===
- Iron Cross, (including the Knight's Cross)
- War Merit Cross, (including the Knight's Cross)
- German Cross
- Wound Badge
- Wehrmacht Qualification Badges (ribbon format)
- Wehrmacht Combat Clasps (ribbon format)
- Tank Destruction Badge (ribbon format)
- Campaign shields
- Campaign cuff titles
- Eastern Front Medal
- Wehrmacht Long Service Awards
- Eastern People's Medal
- German Olympic Decoration

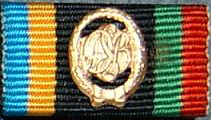
German Sports Badge

=== Sports Decorations ===
- German Armed Forces Badge for Military Proficiency
- German Sports Badge
- German rescue swimming badge
- Cross for the Four Day Marches (Netherlands)

=== Qualification insignia ===
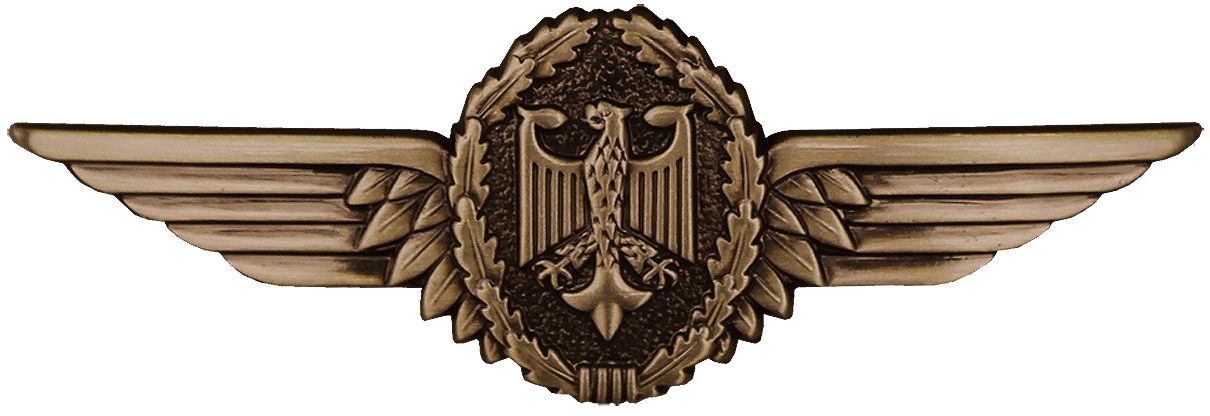
German Aviation Badge in Bronze

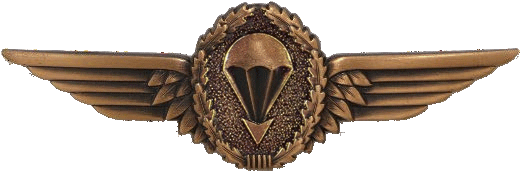
German Parachutist Badge

- German Pilot Badge
- Parachutist Badge
- Commando Badge
- German Naval Qualification Badges
- Air Force Protection Badge
- German Marksmanship Lanyards

=== Foreign awards ===
- NATO Medal
- Serge Lazareff Prize
- United Nations Medal
- United Nations Special Service Medal
- United Nations Medal for Service with United Nations Peace Forces (UNPF)
- Awards and decorations of allied countries, including the USA and France

== See also ==
- Orders, decorations, and medals of the German Empire
- Orders, decorations, and medals of East Germany
- Orders, decorations, and medals of Nazi Germany
