= Mojib Latif =

German scientist (born 1954)

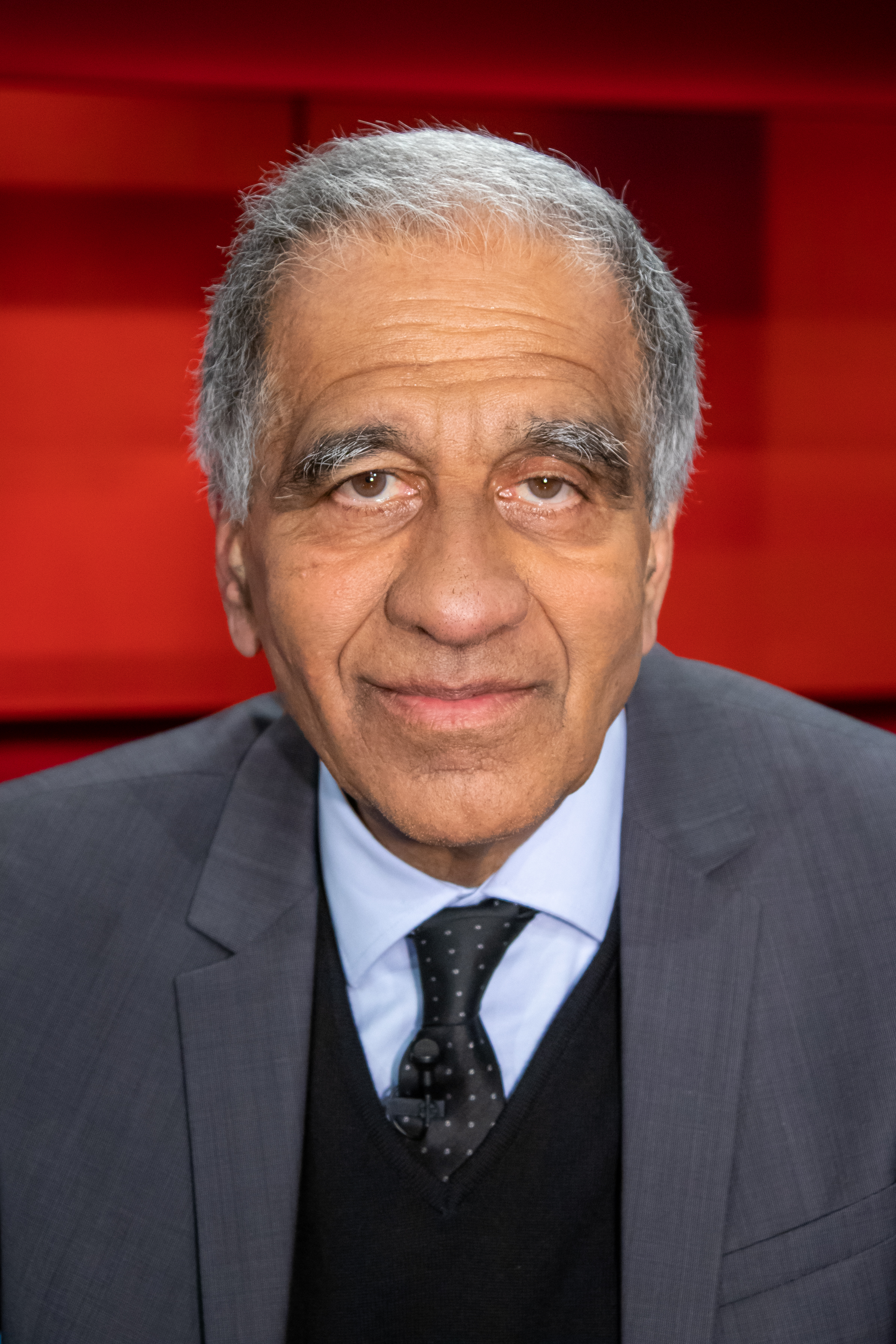
- Latif in 2020
- Born: 29 September 1954 (age 71); Hamburg, West Germany (now Germany)
- Education: University of Hamburg
- Spouse: Elisabeth Latif
- Scientific career
- Fields: Meteorology and oceanography
- Workplaces: University of Kiel; GEOMAR Helmholtz Centre for Ocean Research Kiel
- Doctoral advisor: Klaus Hasselmann

Mojib Latif (born 29 September 1954) is a German meteorologist and oceanographer of Pakistani descent. Latif graduated with a Diplom in meteorology in 1983. He took a position as scientist at the Max Planck Institute for Meteorology in 1985. In 1987 he earned a Ph.D. in oceanography from the University of Hamburg. In 2003 he became professor at IFM-GEOMAR, Kiel, the Leibniz Institute of Marine Sciences. Latif is a regular guest at TV discussions about global warming.

== Academic career ==
From 1974 to 1976, Latif studied business administration, administration, mathematics, physics, oceanography and meteorology at the University of Hamburg. Latif graduated in meteorology and completed his Ph.D. in 1987, under Klaus Hasselmann in oceanography. His thesis was titled Model Theoretical Investigation of the Low-Frequency Variability of the Equatorial Pacific Ocean Circulation.

In 2008 Latif was joint author of a modelling study in Nature whose results suggested "global surface temperature may not increase over the next decade, as natural climate variations in the North Atlantic and tropical Pacific temporarily offset the projected anthropogenic warming." According to this study, global surface temperatures from 2005 to 2015 could be only slightly warmer than the 2000 to 2010 period. In the period from 2010 to 2020, surface temperature were expected to rise again. This study concluded that new heat records were not in prospect until the decade 2010 to 2020.

At the UN's World Climate Conference 2009 in Geneva Latif gave a talk about prediction that used, amongst other material, results from this paper. New Scientist reported about Latif's research that "we could be about to enter one or even two decades of cooler temperatures". This interpretation has been stated as incorrect in an interview with Latif, after being asked whether he was a "global warming sceptic", he explained that "If my name was not Mojib Latif, my name would be global warming. So I really believe in Global Warming. Okay. However, you know, we have to accept that there are these natural fluctuations, and therefore, the temperature may not show additional warming temporarily." In 2000, he gave an interview to the German journal Der Spiegel where he said "Winter with strong frost and a lot of snow, as happened 20 years ago, will no longer exist in our region."

== Awards ==
- 2000 Sverdrup Gold Medal Award
- 2015 German Environmental Prize
- 2016 Order of Merit of Schleswig-Holstein
- 2023 Officer's Cross of the Order of Merit of the Federal Republic of Germany

=== Memberships ===
- 2007 Academy of Sciences and Humanities in Hamburg

== Selected publications ==
- Keenlyside, N. S.; Latif M.; Jungclaus, J.; Kornblueh, L.; Roeckner, E. (2008). "Advancing decadal-scale climate prediction in the North Atlantic sector". Nature. 453 (7191): 84–88. Bibcode:2008Natur.453...84K. doi:10.1038/nature06921. PMID 18451859. S2CID 4301507.
- Timmermann, A.; Oberhuber, J.; Bacher, A.; Esch, M.; Latif M.; Roeckner, E. (1999). "Increased El Niño frequency in a climate model forced by future greenhouse warming". Nature. 398 (6729): 694–697. Bibcode:1999Natur.398..694T. doi:10.1038/19505. S2CID 4429156.
- Latif, M.; Barnett, T. P. (1994). "Causes of Decadal Climate Variability over the North Pacific and North America". Science. 266 (5185): 634–637. Bibcode:1994Sci...266..634L. doi:10.1126/science.266.5185.634. hdl:21.11116/0000-0001-C0DC-E. PMID 17793457. S2CID 22233288.

== Personal life ==
Latif's father, Chaudhry Abdul Latif, migrated to Germany from Pakistan. He was an imam and one of the founders of Hamburg's Ahmadi-affiliated Fazle Omar Mosque in 1957. Latif is married to Norwegian-born Elisabeth Latif.
