= German Flood Service Medal (2013) =

German Flood Service Medal 2013
- German Flood Service Medal 2013
- Type: Service Medal
- Awarded for: At least one day of service in relief work during the 2013 German Floods
- Description: One class
- Country: Germany
- Presented by: Federal Ministries of the Interior and Defense
- Eligibility: Members of the Bundeswehr, Bundespolizei, Technisches Hilfswerk, and civilians.
- Established: 2 July 2013
- Ribbon bar of the medal

The German Flood Service Medal 2013 (German: Einsatzmedaille Fluthilfe 2013) is a military and civil award of Germany. Established on 2 July 2013 by joint decree of the Federal Minister of the Interior Hans-Peter Friedrich and Federal Minister of Defence Thomas de Maizière, the medal is awarded for approved service during the 2013 European floods. It was approved by the President of Germany on 23 October 2013.

== Criteria ==
The medal may be awarded to the members of the Bundeswehr, Bundespolizei, Technisches Hilfswerk, foreign armed forces, as well as civilians who provided assistance to the relief efforts of the federal agencies. To be eligible persons must have served at least one day after 30 May 2013, in the flood affected areas of the Danube and Elbe basins during the 2013 European floods.

The medal is awarded by the Federal Ministry of Defence to members of the Bundeswehr, foreign military personnel, and other individuals who provided assistance to the ministry during relief efforts. The Federal Ministry of the Interior awards the medal to members of the Bundespolizei, Technisches Hilfswerk, and others who provided assistance to the ministry during relief efforts of the people of the 2013 flood.

== Appearance ==
The medal is round, 35 mm (1.4 in) wide, and made of silver colored metal. The obverse of the medal depicts stylized flood waters passing before partially submerged buildings. Below the scene, in relief, is Fluthilfe 2013 (Flood relief 2013). The reverse bears the Bundesadler with the words Dank und Anerkennung (Gratitude and Appreciation) below. The medal is suspended by a ribbon 30 mm (1.2 in) wide and 40 mm (1.6 in) long of dark blue with the edges in the German national colors, black-red-gold.

The service ribbon of the medal is in the same colors as the suspension ribbon. The service ribbon is 25 mm (0.98 in) wide and 12 mm (0.47 in) high, with the edge stripes of black-red-gold 2 mm (0.079 in) wide each. In the center of the ribbon is worn a 10 mm (0.39 in) wide representation of the obverse of the medal.

== See also ==
- Awards and decorations of the German Armed Forces
- German Flood Service Medal (2002)
