= Combat Action Medal of the Bundeswehr =

German Bundeswehr military decoration

Einsatzmedaille Gefecht Combat Action Medal of the Bundeswehr
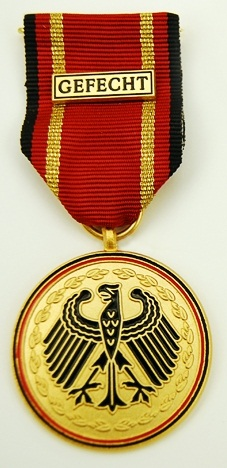
- Type: Military Medal
- Awarded for: Active participation in ground or surface combat or suffering from terrorist or military violence with exposure to a high personal endangerment
- Description: Special class of the German Armed Forces Deployment Medal
- Presented by: the Federal Republic of Germany
- Eligibility: Soldiers of the German armed forces
- Status: Currently awarded
- Established: November 2010
- First award: 25 November 2010

Precedence
- Next (higher): Gold Cross of Honour for Outstanding Deeds
- Next (lower): German Armed Forces Deployment Medal

The Combat Action Medal of the Bundeswehr (German: Einsatzmedaille Gefecht) is a military decoration awarded by the German Bundeswehr. The medal is awarded for active participation in combat actions or for the suffering from terrorist attacks. It is awarded only once and, if the recipient was killed in action, posthumously.

== History ==
The medal was initiated by then minister of defense Karl-Theodor zu Guttenberg and introduced by the President of Germany, Christian Wulff in 2010. The initiation of the medal took place against the backdrop of more and more German soldiers being involved in combat situations while participating in missions abroad, especially in Afghanistan. Prior to the establishment of the Combat Action Medal, achievements and services rendered in combat were only recognized by the awarding of the German Armed Forces Deployment Medal. The criteria for that award is primarily time spent in the theatre, so there is no distinction whether a soldier was deployed as a member of a staff or if he was deployed as part of combat troops, actively participating in battles. In 2011, the medal was awarded to a non-German soldier for this first time.

== Criteria ==
The medal may be awarded to any member of the Bundeswehr who has actively participated in combat operations or has been in a terrorist attack, under great personal risk, such as by roadside bombs or suicide bombers. The date of qualifying operations is from 29 April 2009 to the present. The medal may also be awarded to those individuals who are killed while participating in combat operations or during a terrorist attack. This award is meant to be broader than a traditional wound badge such as the Purple Heart.

== Appearance ==
The Combat Action Medal is a special class of the German Armed Forces Deployment Medal and shares many design features and the same ribbon. The medal is gold in colour, with a black and red enameled border around the edge. The German Federal Eagle in the center is enameled in black. On the suspension ribbon of the medal, and the service ribbon worn in undress, is a gold coloured clasp with the word Gefecht (Combat).

== See also ==
- Awards and decorations of the German Armed Forces
