= Academy of Sciences and Humanities in Hamburg =

The Academy of Sciences and Humanities in Hamburg (German: Akademie der Wissenschaften in Hamburg) is a German scientific society located in Hamburg and a member of the Association of German Academies of Sciences and Humanities. The Academy's members are distinguished scientists from northern Germany. The Academy's mission is to conduct interdisciplinary research, both independently and in collaboration with scientists and research institutions in Germany and abroad.

== Description ==
The Hamburg Academy of Sciences and Humanities is the newest member of the Union of German Academies of Sciences and Humanities. The Academy of Sciences was founded in 2004 by the Hamburg Parliament as a public corporation. It promotes cooperation between disciplines, universities and scientific institutions in the region and promotes cooperation between science and the public through events and publications. The Hamburg Academy offered student laboratories and promoted young scientists in Hamburg, Mecklenburg-Vorpommern and Schleswig-Holstein by financially supporting interdisciplinary conferences for young researchers.

Edwin Kreutzer served as President of the Academy from 2013 to 2021. In 2021, climate researcher Mojib Latif became the new president of the Academy.

== Academy Projects ==
The Academy oversees long-term scientific projects: the development of an electronic dictionary based on the German Sign Language corpus, the written culture of Christian Ethiopia and Eritrea, grammars, corpora and language technologies for indigenous North Eurasian languages, a new edition of early medieval formulae, digital indexing of manuscripts, user groups and cultural environments. Structure and organization The Academy consists of 80 full members from all academic disciplines, as well as corresponding members and honorary members. It is organized into interdisciplinary working groups in which projects are developed and worked on.

== Awards ==
The Hamburg Academy of Sciences and Humanities awards a scientific prize of 100,000 euros every two years, the highest award among all German scientific academies.

== Link ==
- Academy webpages (in German)
