= German Flood Service Medal (2002) =

German Flood Service Medal 2002
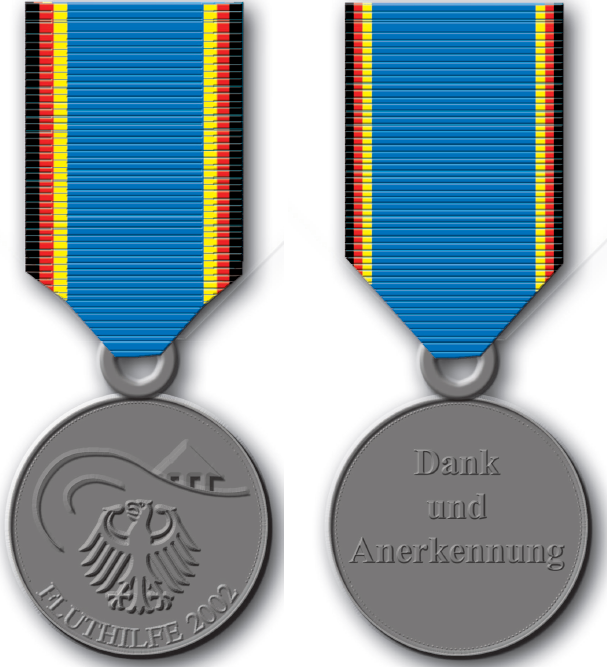
- German Flood Service Medal 2002
- Type: Service Medal
- Awarded for: At least one day of service in relief work during the 2002 German Flood
- Description: One class
- Country: Germany
- Presented by: Federal Ministries of the Interior and Defense
- Eligibility: Members of the Bundeswehr, Bundesgrenzschutz, Technisches Hilfswerk, and civilians.
- Established: 20 September 2002
- Ribbon bar of the medal

The German Flood Service Medal 2002 (German: Einsatzmedaille Fluthilfe 2002) is a decoration of the Federal Republic of Germany.

The decoration was awarded to all German military members, foreign armed service members, civilian rescue forces and civilians, who had collaborated with the flood disaster relief efforts in Germany in the summer of 2002. It was approved for wear by the Minister of Defence, but was created by the Ministry of the Interior. The medal is awarded in the same class to all German soldiers regardless of rank. It is the only type of its kind in the German awards system. Some German federal states have created their own flood medals for its citizens, but The German Flood Service Medal 2002 is the first federally created flood decoration in Germany.

== Design ==
The medal is round, on its center is displayed the German eagle with a flood wave and a half sunk house, the reverse side is plain with the words "Gratitude and Recognition" (German: Dank und Anerkennung).

The ribbon has two black stripes on the edges, with two red stripes beside it, with two gold stripes on the inside of the red stripes and in the center is a blue stripe. The ribbon bar has the medal clasp attached to it.

== See also ==
- Awards and decorations of the German Armed Forces
- German Flood Service Medal (2013)
- Prussian Lifesaving Medal, an example of an earlier German state-awarded decoration of a similar nature.
