= German Armed Forces Deployment Medal =

German Armed Forces Deployment Medal Einsatzmedaille der Bundeswehr
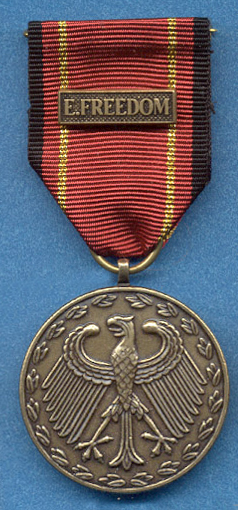
- Obverse of the Deployment Medal in bronze
- Type: Military Medal
- Awarded for: Military Campaigns
- Description: Comes in three classes, Gold, Silver and Bronze
- Presented by: the Federal Republic of Germany
- Eligibility: Soldiers of the German armed forces
- Status: Currently awarded
- Established: 25 April 1996
- Ribbon bar
- Related: Gefechtsmedaille der Bundeswehr

The German Armed Forces Deployment Medal (German: Einsatzmedaille der Bundeswehr) is a decoration of the Bundeswehr, the armed forces of the Federal Republic of Germany. The decoration is awarded for military service in a designated military campaign. It is awarded to all German soldiers regardless of rank. It is also the only type of German campaign medal awarded, the only difference is the campaign bar worn on the medal and ribbon.

== Grades ==
The decoration has three grades. The grade is awarded without consideration of rank but by the time a served in the designated campaign area:

- Bronze for 30 days in theatre.
- Silver is for 360 days in theatre.
- Gold for 690 days in theatre.

In November 2010, Karl-Theodor zu Guttenberg, the German minister of defense, introduced a special grade: the Gefechtsmedaille der Bundeswehr (Combat Action Medal of the Bundeswehr). The medal has been awarded for 56 different operations or missions since its establishment.

== Design ==
The medal is round, on its center is displayed the German eagle surrounded by a wreath of laurel leaves, the reverse side is plain. The combat version differs slightly from standard grades in that the medal is always golden with a black and red rim and a black eagle.

The ribbon has two black stripes on the edges with two red stripes beside it and two golden stripes on the in side with another bold red stripe in the middle, the ribbon bar has the campaign bar attached to it.

== Campaign Bars ==
The medal is issued with a clasp denoting foreign the operation recognized by the medal. Like the medal the clasp is either, bronze, silver or gold:

Ribbon bar	Operation	Dates
	Humanitarian assistance for 2004 Indian Ocean earthquake in Aceh, Indonesia	3 January – 18 March 2005
	Operation Active Endeavour, monitoring and maritime surveillance in the fight against terrorism.	26 October 2001 – present
	Operation Active Fence, a NATO mission to guard the border of member state Turkey from attacks related to the Syrian Civil War.	4 December 2012 – present
	African-led International Support Mission to Mali (AFISMA), military mission to support the government of Mali against Islamist rebels in the Northern Mali conflict.	20 December 2012 – 25 April 2013
	AFOR (Albania Force), a NATO humanitarian assistance mission in Albania for refugees of Kosovo.	13 April – 8 August 1999
	Operation Allied Force, NATO air operations against the Federal Republic of Yugoslavia.	24 March – 10 June 1999
	NATO Operation Allied Harmony, a continuation of Operation Fox, a peacekeeping-mission in the Republic of Macedonia.	15 December 2002 – 31 March 2003
	Operation Allied Harvest, ammunition salvage operations in emergency jettison areas of the Adriatic Sea.	12 June – 24 August 1999
	Operation Atalanta, anti-piracy operations off the coast of Somalia.	19 December 2008 – present
	Operation Eagle Assist, NATO air defense operations following the September 11 attacks.	12 October 2001 – 16 May 2002
	Operation Enduring Freedom, fight against international terrorism.	16 November 2001 – 28 June 2010
	Service in Operation Allied Harmony after the transition of the mission to European Union (EU) command.	31 March – 12 December 2003
	EUCAP NESTOR, an EU-led mission to build the capacities of countries in the Horn of Africa and the western Indian Ocean in the field of maritime security.	16 July 2012 – present
	EUFOR multi-national peacekeeping force in Bosnia-Herzegovina.	2 December 2004 – 27 September 2012
	EUFOR RCA, a United Nations-mandated European Union peacekeeping mission in Bangui, Central African Republic.	1 April 2014 – present
	EUFOR RD Congo, an EU deployment in support of the United Nations Mission in the Democratic Republic of Congo (MONUC) during the period encompassing the general elections in the DR Congo.	12 June – 23 December 2006
	EUTM Mali, a European Union multi-national military training mission headquartered in Bamako, Mali to train and advise the military of Mali.	17 January 2013 – present
	EUTM Somalia, a training mission of the EU for the Somali Armed Forces.	15 February 2010 – present
	NATO mission to protect international observers from the Organization for Security and Co-operation in Europe (OSCE) and the EU in Macedonia.	27 September 2001 – 15 December 2002
	Implementation Force (IFOR), a NATO multi-national peace enforcement force in Bosnia-Herzegovina under the Operation Joint Endeavour, or as part of the earlier Rapid Reaction Force as part of UNPROFOR.	8 August 1995 – 20 December 1996
	International Force for East Timor (INTERFET), service with multi-national forces in East-Timor.	17 November 1999 – 23 February 2000
	International Security Assistance Force (ISAF) in Afghanistan.	22 December 2001 – present
	Kosovo Force (KFOR), a NATO peacekeeping force responsible for establishing security in Kosovo.	12 June 1999 – present
	Kosovo Verification Mission (KVM) was an OSCE mission to verify that Serb forces were complying with the October Agreement to end atrocities in Kosovo	4 December 1998 – 8 June 1999
	United Nations Mission for the Referendum in Western Sahara (MINURSO) a United Nations peacekeeping mission in Western Sahara, established under United Nations Security Council Resolution 690.	29 April 1991 – present
	United Nations Multidimensional Integrated Stabilization Mission in Mali (MINUSMA) a United Nations peacekeeping mission in Mali.	25 April 2013 – present
	OSCE observer mission in Georgia.	28 August 2008 – 30 June 2009
	Stabilization Force (SFOR), a NATO-led multinational peacekeeping force deployed to Bosnia-Herzegovina after the Bosnian War.	20 December 1996 – 2 December 2004
	Operation Sharp Guard, surveillance and enforcement of a naval blockade in the Adriatic Sea against Yugoslavia.	30 June 1995 – 19 June 1996
	Operation Swift Relief, humanitarian assistance in Pakistan after the 2005 Kashmir earthquake.	10 October 2005 – 15 April 2006
	United Nations Assistance Mission in Afghanistan (UNAMA), a UN political mission established to assist the Government and people of Afghanistan in laying the foundations for sustainable peace and development.	10 May 2004 – present
	African Union – United Nations Hybrid Operation in Darfur (UNAMID), a joint African Union and United Nations peacekeeping mission in Darfur, Sudan.	15 November 2007 – present
	United Nations High Commission for Refugees (UNHCR) Sarajevo airlift.	30 June 1995 – 9 January 1996
	United Nations Interim Force in Lebanon (UNIFIL), a UN peacekeeping mission to confirm Israeli withdrawal from Lebanon, restore international peace and security, and help the Government of Lebanon restore its effective authority in the area.	20 September 2006 – present
	United Nations Mine Action Center (UNMAC) as part of the United Nations Observer Mission in Bosnia and Herzegovina.	October 1997 – 30 June 1999
	United Nations Mission in Ethiopia and Eritrea (UNMEE), a UN peacekeeping mission to monitor a ceasefire in the Eritrean–Ethiopian War that began in 1998 between Ethiopia and Eritrea.	2 February 2004 – 31 July 2008
	United Nations Interim Administration Mission in Kosovo (UNMIK), a UN mission to support the independence of Kosovo.	6 December 1999 – 21 December 2001
	United Nations Mission in Sudan (UNMIS), a UN mission to support the Comprehensive Peace Agreement between the government of the Sudan and the Sudan People's Liberation Movement.	22 April 2005 – 11 June 2011
	United Nations Mission in the Republic of South Sudan (UNMISS), a UN mission to support the Government of South Sudan.	8 July 2011 – present
	United Nations Observer Mission in Georgia (UNOMIG), a UN observer mission to verify a ceasefire agreement between Georgia and forces in Abkhazia.	30 June 1995 – 15 June 2009
	United Nations Protection Force (UNPF), a UN peacekeeping force in Croatia and in Bosnia-Herzegovina during the Yugoslav wars.	August 1995 – 20 December 1995
	United Nations Special Commission (UNSCOM) in Iraq to ensure compliance to limit Iraqi production and use of weapons of mass destruction after the Gulf War.	June 1991 – September 1996
	Joint mission of the UN and the Organisation for the Prohibition of Chemical Weapons on the maritime escort operations in the hydrolysis of Syrian chemical weapons aboard MV Cape Ray.	27 September 2013 – present
	Western European Union (WEU) mission in the Adriatic Sea	10 May 1999 – 10 April 2001

== See also ==
- Awards and decorations of the German Armed Forces
- Combat Action Medal of the Bundeswehr
