= Saarland Order of Merit =

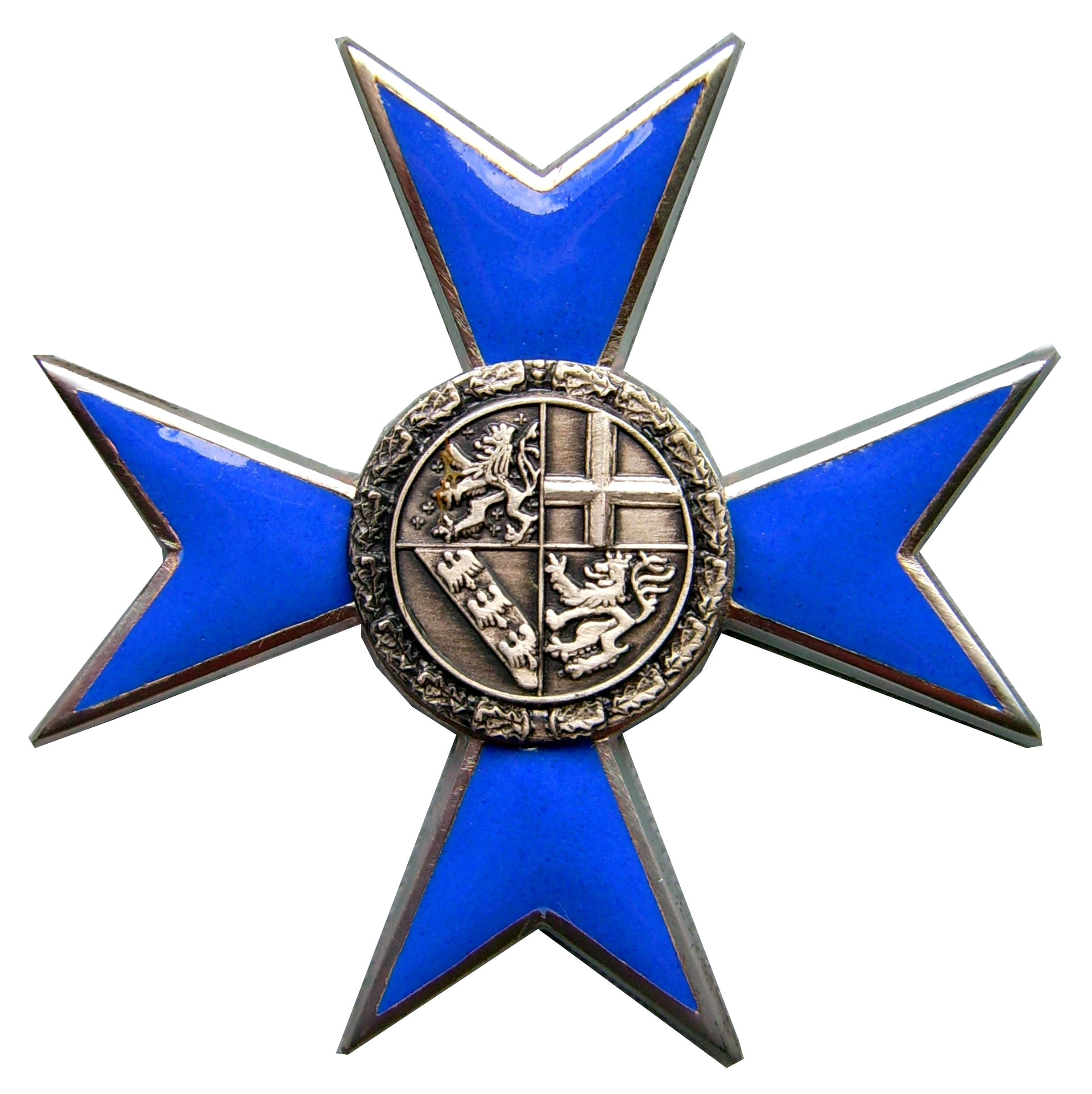
- Cross of the Saarland Order of Merit
- Type: Civil order
- Awarded for: Outstanding service to Saarland
- Presented by: Minister-President of Saarland
- Established: 10 December 1974

The Saarland Order of Merit (German: Saarländischer Verdienstorden) is the highest award of the German State of Saarland. Established on 10 December 1974, the order is presented in recognition for outstanding service to Saarland by the Minister-President of Saarland. Awarded in a single class, in the form of an Officer's Cross (Steckkreuz), the insignia of the order is a blue enameled four-armed eight pointed Maltese cross. In the center of the cross is a silver medallion bearing the wreathed Coat of arms of Saarland.

== Notable recipients ==
- Dieter Thomas Heck
- Jean-Claude Juncker
- Nicole Seibert
