= German commando course =

German army training course

The Bundeswehr (raid-) commando course (German: Einzelkämpferlehrgang) is a course conducted by the German Bundeswehr. The course was established in the early 1980s and is aimed on testing the physical and mental endurance of participants. It teaches special skills and tactics necessary to operate and survive under stressful conditions, and Jagdkampf advanced infantry tactics.

Until recently the Einzelkämpferlehrgang was a requirement for all officers in the German Army. However, it is now only a requirement for officers and NCOs in combat leadership roles, and is optional for non-combat duties. The course was taught at the German paratrooper school in Altenstadt, Upper Bavaria, now only at the German infantry school in Hammelburg. It is still a requirement for officers of combat troops, while for non-combat troops it has been replaced by a dedicated survival course (German: Lehrgang infanteristischer Kompetenzerhalt).

The unarmed close quarter combat instructor part of the Advanced course has been modified into its own separate course in 2010. It now closely follows the Krav Maga curriculum. close quarter combat is still part of the basic course curriculum.

The course is separated into two parts:

Basic course (Grundlehrgang) EKL1

- Survival-skills
- Small unit tactics

Advanced course (Leistungslehrgang) EKL2

- Instructor certification for previously acquired skills
- Leadership and advanced infantry minor tactics.
- Guerrilla warfare fundamentals

== Sample schedule for basic course ==
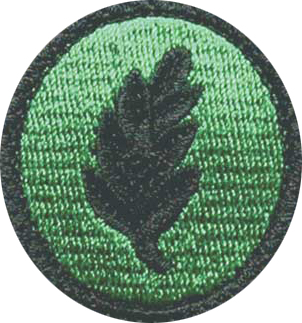
Patch for completion of the basic course EKL1.

Week 1

- Arrival
- 3000m track and obstacle course, classroom instruction, receiving firearms, briefing
- Relocating to training area, speedy march (with the least resting possible), training in camouflage and firearms, transporting wounded soldiers
- Classroom instruction, navigation exercise in day and night
- 3000m track and obstacle course, instruction in knots

Week 2

- 3000m track, obstacle course, ambushing, hand-to-hand fighting (Krav Maga since 2008)
- Rappelling, Zodiac boats, ambushing
- Rappelling, crossing rivers, hand-to-hand fighting, obstacle course
- Hand-to-hand fighting, obstacle course

Week 3 "Hungerweek" max. 1 MRE per week

- Camouflage, hand-to-hand fighting, obstacle course, night navigation exercise, setting up bivouac
- SERE exercise
- 24-hour exercise including transportation of wounded soldiers
- Survival skills, hand-to-hand fighting
- Hand-to-hand fighting

Week 4

- Final exercises, 70 km march
- Debriefing, awarding of Einzelkämpfer patch by commander

== Sample schedule for advanced course ==
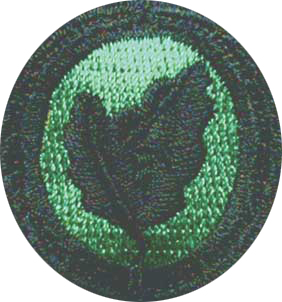
Patch for completion of the advanced course EKL2.

Week 1

- Arrival
- Introduction, initial physical fitness test (obstacle course in less than 1:50 min, 7000m march with 20 kg backpack in less than 52min)
- Training in firearms and equipment (ropes, radios, etc.), classroom instruction
- Hand-to-hand fighting, land navigation, parachute jump
- Hand-to-hand fighting

Week 2

- Relocation to Sauwald, instruction in handling explosives, instruction in ambushing, map reading
- Rock climbing in Füssen
- Basics of commando actions
- Ambushing
- Commando exercise
- Hand-to-hand fighting

Week 3

- Rock climbing
- Briefing, relocating to training area
- Infiltration, evasion, reconnaissance, ambushing
- Evasion and escaping, extraction, debriefing
- Written test, test for hand-to-hand combat instructor

Week 4

- Written test, commando warfare, briefing
- Evasion, reconnaissance, ambush
- Evasion, using hideouts and alternative hideouts
- Debriefing
- Hand-to-hand fighting, urban warfare

Week 5

- Briefing, relocation to training area
- Establishing hideouts, reconnaissance, ambushing
- Debriefing
- Returning equipment
- Awarding of Einzelkämpfer patch, end of course

== Einzelkämpferabzeichen ==
Einzelkämpferabzeichen
- Type: Patch
- Awarded for: Completion of commando course
- Description: Awarded in two levels
- Country: Germany
- Presented by: Armed Forces of Germany
- Status: Currently awarded
- Established: Early 1980s

For the successful completion of each part of the course, the Einzelkämpferabzeichen (Lone-warrior badge) patch is awarded. The patch shows either one (for completion of basic course) or two (for completion of advanced course) dark green oak leaved with light green background.

== Comparable courses ==
- (United States) Ranger school
- (United Kingdom) All Arms Commando Course
