= Order of Merit of Rhineland-Palatinate =

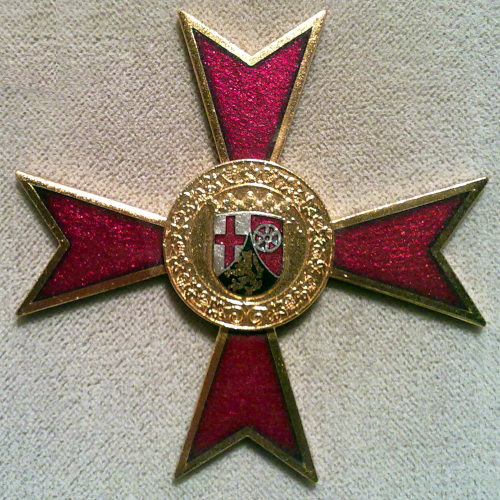
- Type: Civil order of merit
- Awarded for: Outstanding contributions to the state of Rhineland-Palatinate
- Country: Germany
- Presented by: the Minister-President of Rhineland-Palatinate
- Established: 2 October 1981
- Ribbon bar of the order

The Order of Merit of Rhineland-Palatinate (German: Verdienstorden des Landes Rheinland-Pfalz) is a civil order of merit, of the German State of Rhineland-Palatinate. The order is presented for outstanding service to the state and people of Rhineland-Palatinate. It was founded on 2 October 1981, and first awarded in 1982. The order is limited to 800 living recipients. Through 2012, the order had been awarded 1035 times.
