= Order of Merit of Schleswig-Holstein =

Order of Merit of Schleswig-Holstein Verdienstorden des Landes Schleswig-Holstein
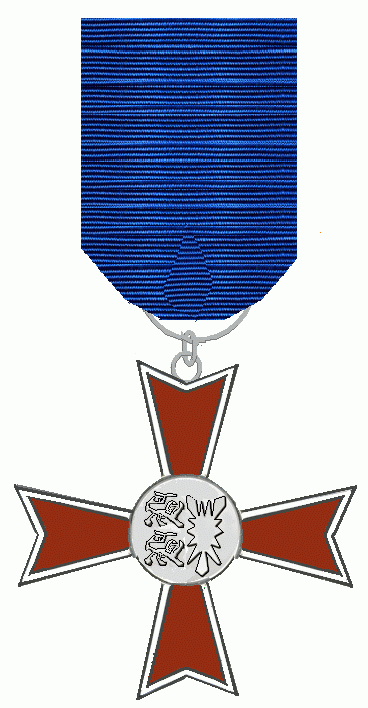
- Order of Merit of Schleswig-Holstein
- Type: Order of merit
- Country: Germany
- Presented by: Minister-President of Schleswig-Holstein
- Established: 26 August 2008
- Ribbon bar of the order
- Related: Schleswig-Holstein-Medaille

The Order of Merit of Schleswig-Holstein (German: Verdienstorden des Landes Schleswig-Holstein) is an award presented by the Minister-President of German state Schleswig-Holstein. Established in 2008, it is the highest award of the state. Prior to 2008, the Schleswig-Holstein-Medaille was the highest award of the state. In the establishing decree of the order it states prior recipients of the medal are members of the order. To preserve the exclusivity of the order it is limited to 500 living recipients.

== Notable recipients ==
- Dennis Snower
- Christoph Eschenbach
- Justus Frantz
- Klaus Fußmann
- Ulrich Schulte-Wülwer
- Angelika Volquartz
- Knut Kiesewetter
- Carl Holst
- Lü Zushan
- Jens Oddershede
- Toshizō Ido
- Mojib Latif
- Otto Bernhardt
- Detlev Buck
