= Ehrenzeichen des Technischen Hilfswerks =

Decoration of the Federal Agency for Technical Relief Ehrenzeichen des Technischen Hilfswerks
- Type: Civil decoration
- Awarded for: Meritious service in the field of emergency management or civil protection
- Description: Three classes
- Country: Germany
- Presented by: Federal Ministry of the Interior
- Eligibility: Members of the Bundeswehr, Bundespolizei, Technisches Hilfswerk, and civilians
- Status: Currently awarded
- Established: 2 September 1975 and 13 June 1990
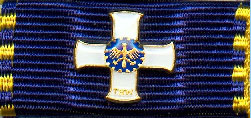
- Ribbon bar of the cross in gold

The Decoration of the Federal Agency for Technical Relief (German: Ehrenzeichen des Technischen Hilfswerks) is a German decoration founded in 1975. It is awarded by the Technisches Hilfswerk (THW) and is approved by the president of Germany.

== History ==
The silver and gold classes were established in 1975. The third class - a medal in bronze - was added in 1990. All classes are awarded for meritorious service in the THW or exemplary achievements in the field of emergency management or civil protection.

Prior to 1975, only internal awards of THW existed. These did not have the approval of the president of Germany, and could not be worn on uniforms of the Bundeswehr or Bundespolizei. They have a tradition that dates back to the early days of the THW in the 1950s. The THW-Helferzeichen in Gold and THW-Helferzeichen in Gold mit Kranz are still awarded today, but they rank below the Decoration of the Federal Agency for Technical Relief.

== Classes ==
The Decoration of the Federal Agency for Technical Relief is awarded in three classes:

- Medal in bronze: max. 180 members of the THW and 25 others per year
- Cross in silver:max. 90 members of the THW and 15 others per year
- Cross in Gold:max. 15 members of the THW and 5 others per year
