= Technisches Hilfswerk =

Civil protection organization

Federal Agency for Technical Relief
- Bundesanstalt Technisches Hilfswerk (THW)
- Federal sign of the THW

- Main logo of the THW

Agency overview
- Formed: August 22, 1950; 76 years ago
- Preceding agency: Technische Nothilfe
- Jurisdiction: Germany
- Headquarters: Bonn-Lengsdorf
- Employees: 2,200+; 88,000+ volunteers
- Annual budget: EUR 428,629,000 (2023)
- Agency executive: Sabine Lackner, president
- Parent agency: Federal Ministry of the Interior
- Child agencies: 3 training centers; 8 regional offices; 4 logistic centers; 66 branch offices; 669 local sections
- Website: www.thw.de

The Bundesanstalt Technisches Hilfswerk (German: [ˈtɛçnɪʃəs ˈhɪlfsˌvɛʁk], THW (pronounced [teːhaːˈveː]), English: Federal Agency for Technical Relief) is the federal civil protection organisation of Germany. It is legally part of the Federal Ministry of the Interior and controlled by the German federal government. 97% of its more than 88,000 members (2025) are volunteers.

The predecessor of THW was the "Technische Nothilfe" (Technical Emergency Relief) (TN), founded in 1919 by Otto Lummitzsch, a pioneer (Combat support) officer, which existed in the Weimar Republic and in Nazi Germany until 1945.

== Obligations ==
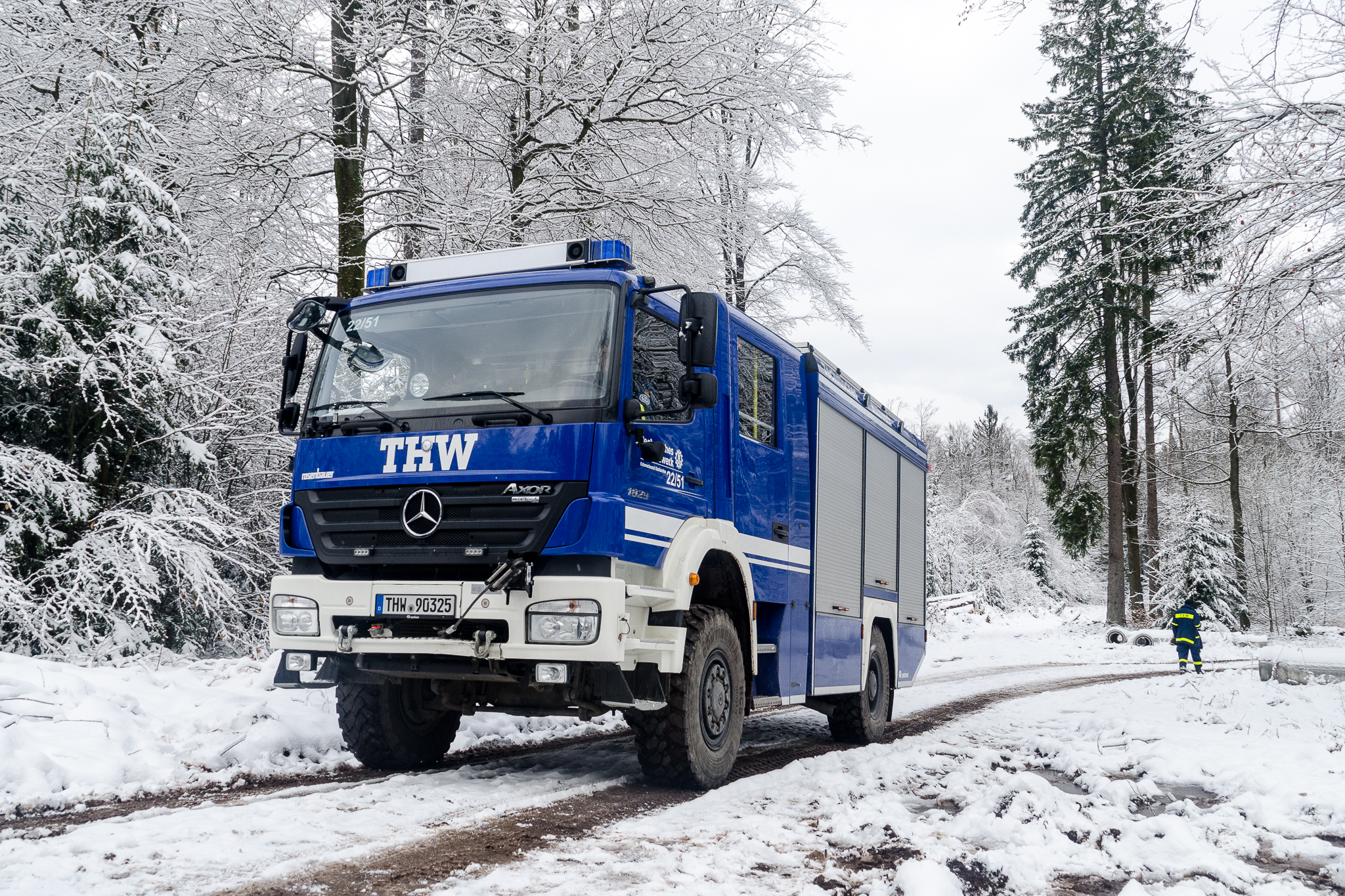
THW Equipment Vehicle (GKW)

The obligations are defined in section 1 of the THW act (Gesetz über das Technische Hilfswerk). These include:

- technical and logistical support for other (German) GOs, NGOs and other authorities like fire brigades, police or the customs authorities
- technical or humanitarian relief in foreign countries, as assigned by the federal government
- technical relief in Germany as part of national civil protection measures.

== History ==
After World War II the Technisches Hilfswerk was founded in 1950, by order of the minister of the interior Gustav Heinemann. The first president of the THW was Otto Lummitzsch, who had founded the THW's predecessor, the Technische Nothilfe (TN) in 1919.

The 'Technical Emergency Corps' (TN) began as a strikebreaker organisation after the First World War, but developed into a volunteer emergency response unit. During the Nazi Germany from 1933 till 1945 TN became in charge of technical civil defence.

When it was founded, the main purpose of the THW was also civil defense in the event of war. This has changed over the decades; today the THW intervenes in a wide spectrum of disasters, such as traffic accidents, industrial disasters, or earthquakes.

On 7 February 1953, the THW embarked on its first international deployment: Following a major storm in the Netherlands, THW teams participated in the relief and rescue operations. For the first time since World War II, Germans were assisting other countries in an international mission.

The most important domestic operations in the 1960s were the North Sea storm flood in 1962 and the mining accident of Lengede in 1963.

The largest disaster control action took place in August 2002 after the flooding of the Elbe river in eastern Germany. About 24,000 THW members participated in the operation, with up to 10,000 people helping simultaneously along the Elbe and its tributaries.

The largest engagement outside Germany was in France in 2000, after storms Lothar and Martin blew down power lines and trees, blocking many streets, between 26 and 28 December 1999. The main contribution was supplying temporary electrical power for hospitals and other important institutions and rebuilding parts of the electrical system.

The organisation has also been active in many disaster relief operations abroad, for example in Thailand and Sri Lanka after the 2004 Indian Ocean earthquake, in the United States after Hurricane Katrina in 2005, in Pakistan after the 2005 Kashmir earthquake, in 2010 during the flooding in Poland, the 2011 Tōhoku earthquake and tsunami in Japan, the April 2015 Nepal earthquake, and the 2020 Beirut explosions.

In 2021, the THW provided relief during major flooding in southwestern Germany, particularly in the Ahr Valley.

The Russian invasion of Ukraine starting in February 2022 led to the THW's largest logistical operation abroad. By May 2025, the THW had procured and delivered relief supplies worth more than €150 million to its partners. The THW focused particularly on supporting institutions in the front-line areas and on supporting its state partners, the Ukrainian Civil Protection and Disaster Relief Agency, and the Ukrainian Border Guard.

In February 2023, THW personnel deployed to Turkey in the aftermath of the 2023 Turkey–Syria earthquake.

== Organization and personnel ==
As a federal authority which is part of the Federal Ministry of the Interior, the THW is headed by a president and board. Its headquarters (THW-Leitung) are in Bonn-Lengsdorf, together with the Bundesamt für Bevölkerungsschutz und Katastrophenhilfe (BBK) (Federal Office for Civil Protection and Disaster Assistance).

The THW comprises 669 local chapters, 66 regional offices, eight state associations, and the THW administration in Bonn, which consists of the management staff, the commissioner of volunteers, and the Deployment Section with the units

- E1 mission
- E2 foreign
- E3 training
- E4 logistics
- E5 technology
- and the Central Services Section with the units Z1 volunteers and staff, Z2 organization, Z3 finance, Z4 security and health protection, and Z5 information and communication.

The THW logistics center has its office in Heiligenhaus between Düsseldorf and Essen in the highly populated Western part of Germany and is, via its attachment to the Logistics Unit E4, part of the THW administration.

=== Heads of THW ===
- 1952–1955: Otto Lummitzsch
- 1955–1958: Alexander Löfken
- 1958–1962: Rudolf Schmidt
- 1962–1977: Hans Zielinski
- 1977–1985: Hermann Ahrens
- 1985/1986: Helmut Meier
- 1986–2002: Gerd Jürgen Henkel
- 2002–2006: Georg Thiel
- 2006–2020: Albrecht Broemme
- 2020–2023: Gerd Friedsam
- since 1 July 2023: Sabine Lackner

=== Personnel ===
Nearly 88,000 people across Germany volunteer with the THW, of which almost 17,000 are women and girls, and this number is rising.

In Germany, military service was mandatory for adult males until 2011. Instead of joining the military for a shorter period full-time, one of the alternatives was to join a non-combatant volunteer organisation within the German Katastrophenschutz (disaster relief) or Zivilschutz (civil defense) for a minimum of four years (this is calculated so that although serving far less time every week, in the end the number of served hours was about the same). The THW was one of those organisations. Others were too, such as volunteer fire brigades and various organisations engaged in emergency medical service; however, the THW relied more heavily on such quasi-conscripts, as it tends to have less local popularity than e.g. volunteer fire brigades (who tend to be the chief social club of their respective village or town-quarter), and as it had less of an infrastructure of paid employees than, for instance, the German Red Cross.

The THW has its own decoration for meritorious service or exemplary achievements in the field of emergency management or civil protection: All three classes of the Ehrenzeichen des Technischen Hilfswerks are approved by the president of Germany.

==== Ranks ====
In general, the rank structure of the THW is divided into two groups: the volunteers and the full-time employees.

==== Volunteers ====
Chapters
Head of Local Branch (Ortsbeauftragter)	Deputy Head of Local Branch (Stv. Ortsbeauftragter)	Training and Qualification Officer (Ausbildungsbeauftragter) Expert Advisor (Fachberater)	Youth Activity Leader (Jugendbetreuer) Maintenance Sergeant (Schirrmeister) Public Relations and Volunteers Recruitment Officer (Beauftragter für Öffentlichkeitsarbeit) Administration Secretary (Verwaltungsbeauftragter) Cook (Koch)

Technical Platoons & Technical Units
Technical Platoon Leader (Zugführer) Team Leader Logistics Unit(Leiter der Fachgruppe Logistik) Team Leader Command and Communications (Leiter der Fachgruppe Führung/Kommunikation)	Command Squad Leader (Zugtruppführer) Command Department Head (Sachgebietsleiter der Fachgruppe Führung/Kommunikation)	Group Leader (Gruppenführer)	Squad Leader (Truppführer) Command Assistant (Führungsgehilfe)	Helper (Helfer)

Spokespersons and representatives
Federal Spokesperson (Bundessprecher)	Deputy Federal Spokesperson (Stv. Bundessprecher)	State Spokesperson (Landessprecher)	Deputy State Spokesperson (Stv. Landessprecher)	Local Spokesperson (Helfersprecher) Deputy Local Spokesperson (Stv. Helfersprecher)	Representative, Federal Association ('Vertreter Bundesvereinigung) Representative, State Association (Vertreter Landesvereinigung)

==== Full-time employees ====
Chief (Präsident)	Vice-Chief (Vizepräsident)	State Commissioner (Landesbeauftragter) Headmaster of the Federal Academy (Leiter der Bundesschule) Division Chief (Abteilungsleiter) Commissioner of Volunteers (Beauftragter für das Ehrenamt)	Department Chief (Referatsleiter) Academy Manager (Schulmanager) Chief of the Management Staff (Leiter des Leitungsstabes)	Department Consultant (Referent)

Regional Office Chief (Regionalstellenleiter)	Senior Consultant (Sachbearbeiter) Specialist Teacher (Fachlehrer)	Service Consultant (Bürosachbearbeiter Service) Instructor (Ausbilder) Artisan (Gerätehandwerker) Driver (Kraftfahrer)	Consultant (Bürosachbearbeiter) Trainee (Auszubildender) Federal Service Volunteer (Absolvent Bundesfreiwilligendienst) Social Service Volunteer (Absolvent Freiwilliges Soziales Jahr) Intern (Praktikant)

== Field organization ==
=== Organization in Germany ===
The THW is stationed all over Germany in 669 local chapters, called Ortsverbände (OV). Some 80,000 people are active in this organisation including about 15,000 young volunteers (members of the THW Youth). The majority of those are volunteers, while about 1,800 work full-time in its administration. Each local chapter (Ortsverband) maintains one or more Technische Züge (technical platoons), each consisting of one Zugtrupp (command squad), comprising four volunteers, one Bergungsgruppe (rescue units) comprising nine to twelve volunteers, and one to three Fachgruppen (technical units), comprising four to eighteen volunteers.

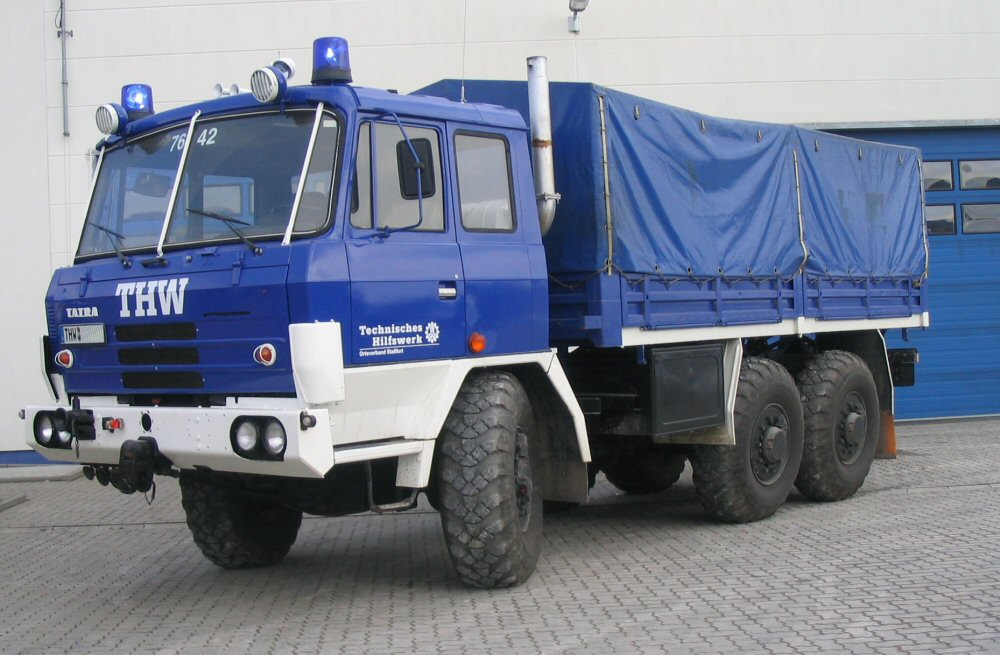
A Tatra 815 from the THW

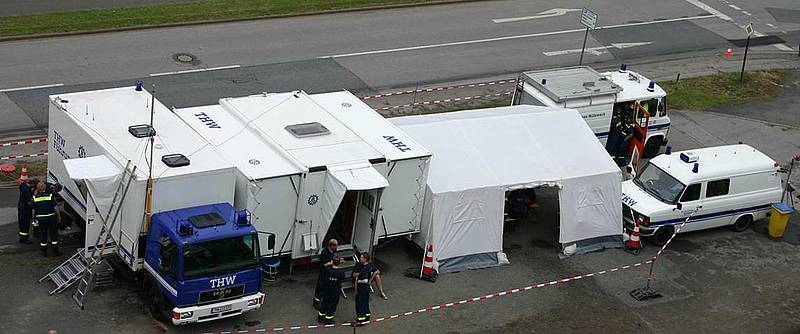
THW Operation Center

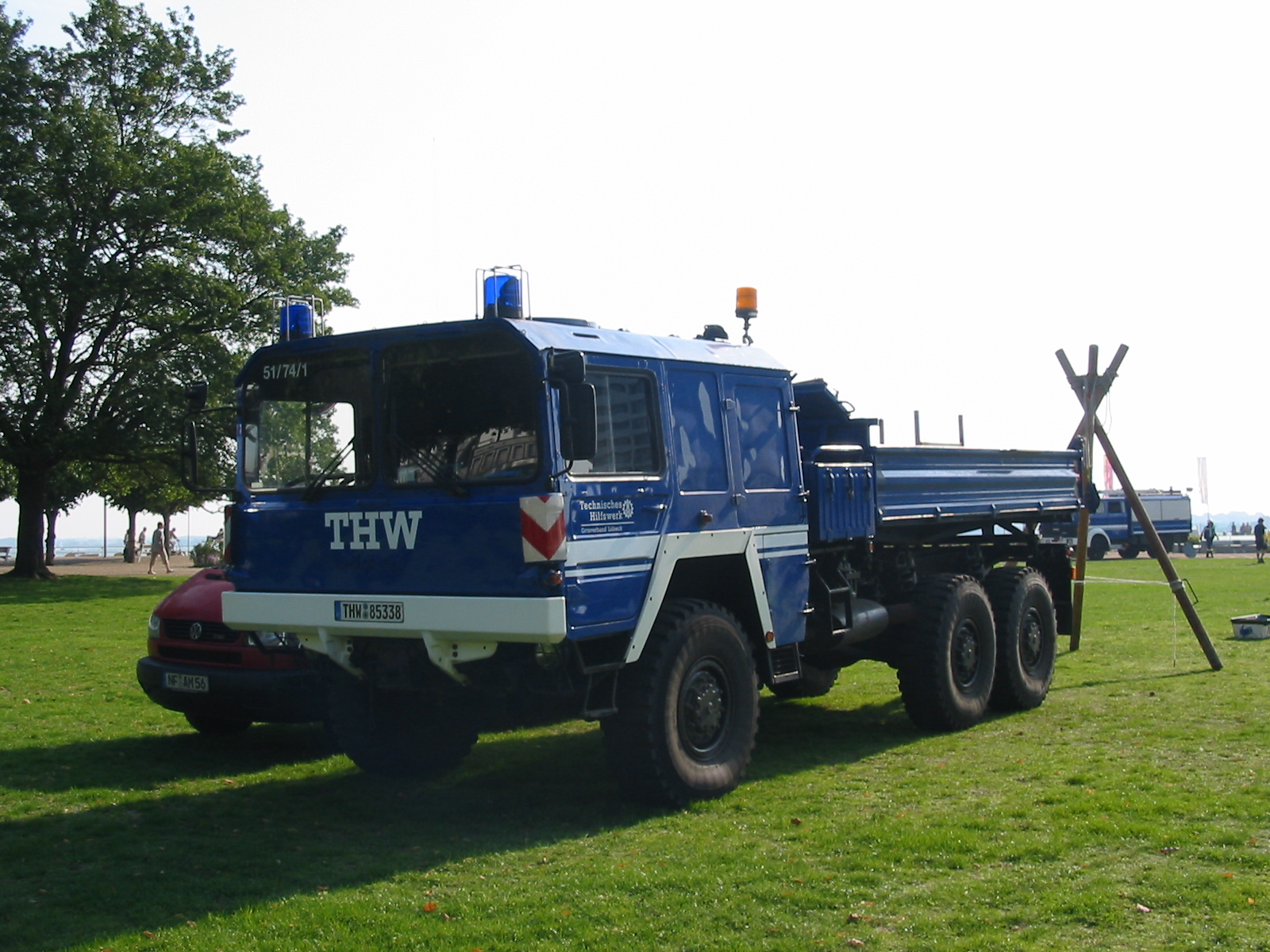
THW six-wheel vehicle at volunteer fair in Travemünde

The main type of THW unit is one of two Bergungsgruppen (1st and 2nd Rescue Groups), equipped with heavy tools like hydraulic cutting devices, chain saws, and pneumatic hammers. Their vehicles are the Gerätekraftwagen 1 (GKW 1) (Equipment Truck 1) for the 1st Rescue Group and the Mehrzweckkraftwagen (MzKW) (Multi-Purpose Truck) or the older Gerätekraftwagen 2 (GKW 2) — which is scheduled to be phased out — for the 2nd Rescue Group.

The Fachgruppen (Technical Units) include:

- Bridge Building (Brückenbau)
- Debris Clearance (Räumen)
- Demolition/Blasting (Sprengen)
- Electricity Supply (Elektroversorgung)
- Emergency Supply and Maintenance, (Notinstandsetzung & Notversorgung, introduced 2019 as a replacement for the former technical unit Illumination and many 2nd rescue units)
- Infrastructure (Infrastruktur)
- Oil Pollution (Ölschaden)
- Search and Rescue (Ortung)
- Water Damage / Pumping (Wasserschaden / Pumpen)
- Water Hazards (Wassergefahren)
- Water Supply and Treatment (Trinkwasserversorgung)
- Recovery (Bergung)
- Unmanned Aerial Systems (Unbemannte Luftfahrtsysteme)

Furthermore, two types of technical units exist outside of technical platoons. They provide support mainly during major incidents or multi-regional operations:

- Logistics (Logistik)
- Command, Control and Communications (Führung und Kommunikation)

=== International deployment ===
For relief in foreign countries, there are four Schnelleinsatzeinheiten Bergung Ausland or SEEBA (Rapid Deployment Unit Search and Rescue Abroad) units according to INSARAG standards, able to go airborne within six hours, and three Schnelleinsatzeinheiten Wasserversorgung Ausland or SEEWA (Rapid Deployment Unit Water Supply and Treatment Abroad) units.

The Schlauchschwinger also operates high capacity pumping (HCP) modules for the EU Civil Protection Mechanism.

Furthermore, the THW has a pool of experts which can be rapidly deployed to places of crisis to perform assessment and coordination tasks within the fields of technical and logistical support. Those experts are also active in capacity building operations.

The long-standing expertise on the international field is also integrated into cooperative projects, such as the Cultural Heritage Response Unit (CHRU), a module focusing on the protection of cultural heritage in disaster management.

== Services provided ==
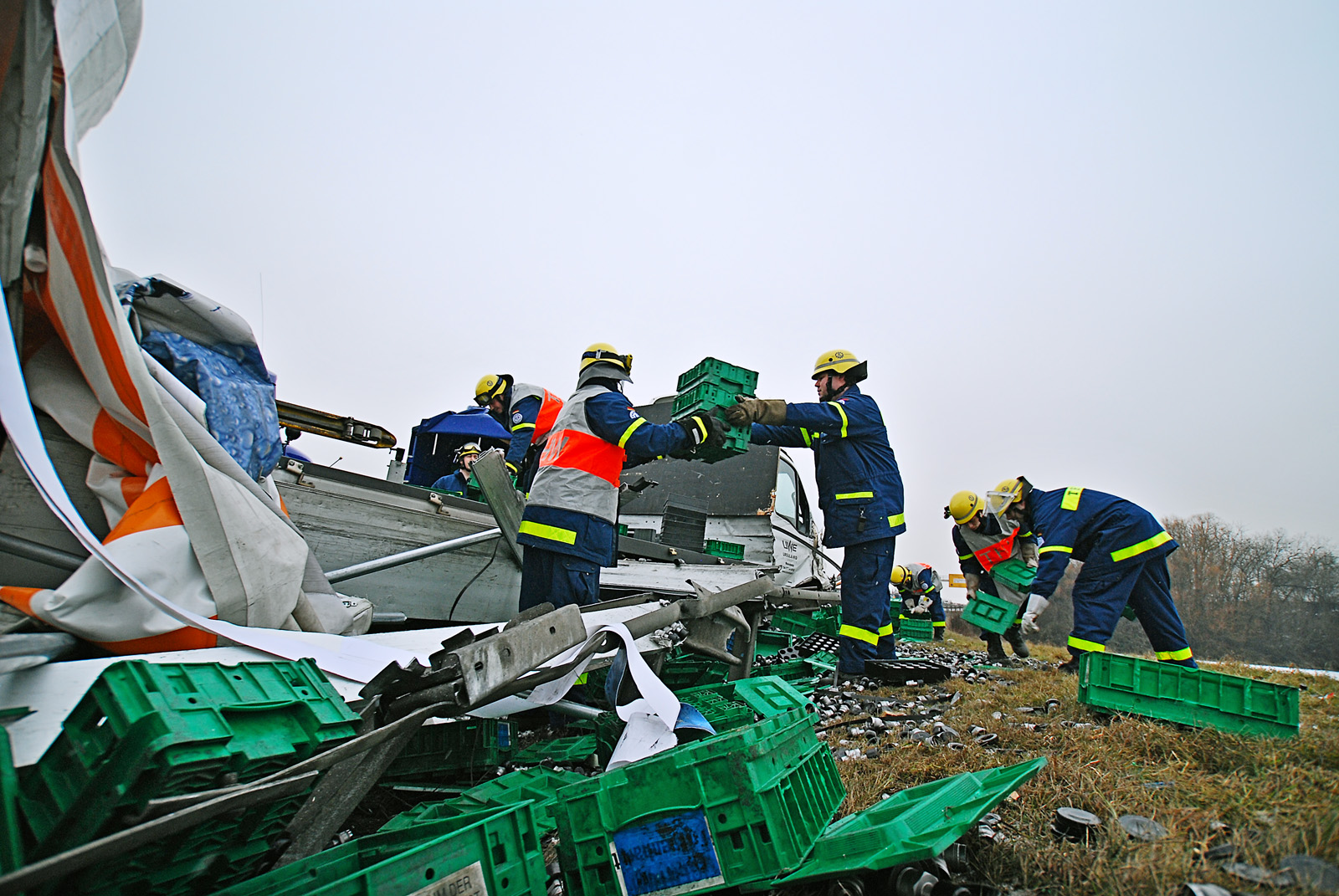
Helping after an accident.

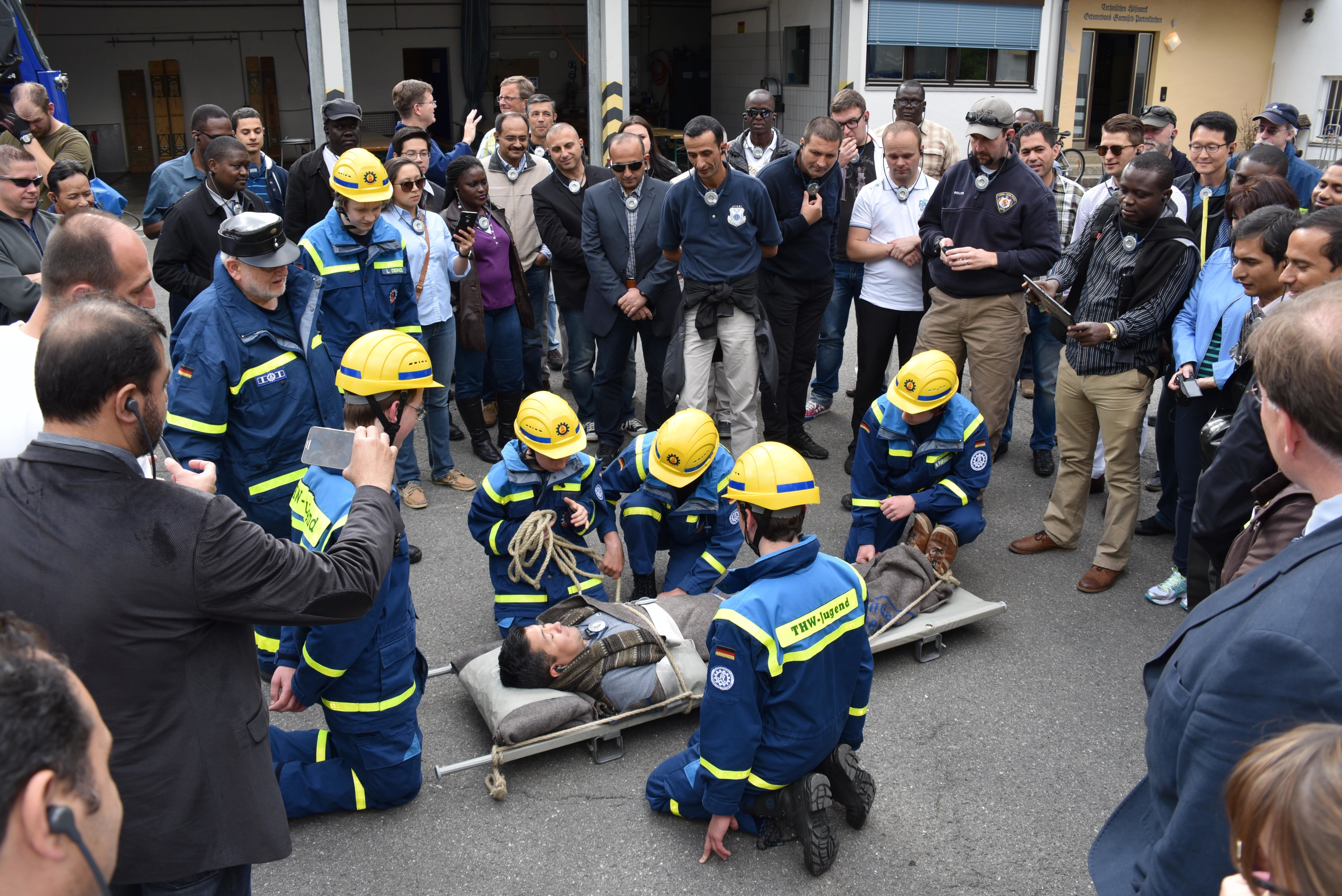
THW personnel during a rescue demonstration at the George C. Marshall European Center for Security Studies in Germany, 2015

Technical threat prevention

- Area lighting
- Clearing and blasting
- Combating flooding and inundation
- Search and rescue, and salvage
- Water rescue

Infrastructure technical support

- Electricity supply
- Emergency bridge work
- Drinking water supply
- Waste water disposal

Command and communication, logistics

- Catering and care of operational staff
- Command center establishment and operation
- Command support
- Creation of temporary telecommunication systems
- Establishment and operation of logistical bases
- Maintenance of material, repair and maintenance work for mission equipment
- Transportation of consumer goods for mission demands

Technical support in environmental protection

- Combating and mitigating oil damage
- Water analysis

Provision of the population

- Electricity and drinking water provision
- Establishment and equipment of emergency accommodation and collecting points with matching infrastructure
- Waste water disposal

Technical support

- Diving
- Makeshift road works
- Maintenance of civil protection facilities such as emergency wells and shelters
- Rescue from heights
- Technical help on traffic routes

== THW-Jugend ==
The THW-Jugend (THW Youth) is the youth organization of the THW. It has set itself the target to introduce boys and girls from the age of six to the work of the THWs in a fun way. The THW-Jugend is not part of the Federal Agency for Technical Relief, but is an independently registered charity. This arrangement was made in order to avoid maintaining a state youth organization.

== See also ==
- Civil defense
  - Civil defense by country
- State Emergency Service – a similar organization in Australia
