= Authorized foreign decorations of the United States military =

Award

Authorized foreign decorations of the United States military are those military decorations which have been approved for wear by members of the United States armed forces but whose awarding authority is the government of a country other than the United States.

== Policy and determination ==
The wear of foreign decorations may either be approved on a case-by-case basis or a general order may be declared allowing for blanket approval to all U.S. service members to wear a particular non-U.S. decoration.

The following is a list of foreign decorations which have been approved at one time for wear on United States military uniforms. Such awards are always worn after all United States decorations and before international military awards. The list below is by no means comprehensive, but does display the awards which have been bestowed to U.S. service members by the governments of foreign countries.

== Awards of specific nations ==
=== Argentina ===
- Order of the Liberator General San Martin
- Order of May in Military Merit

Argentinian decorations are only rarely awarded to senior US officers, most of those senior U.S. officers have been in the United States Southern Command & United States Southern Command Air Forces Commander usually as "end-of-tour" decorations.

=== Australia ===
- Order of Australia (Military Division)

Australian decorations are only rarely awarded to very senior U.S. officers, at the Joint Chiefs of Staff level

=== Austria ===
- Decoration of Honour for Services to the Republic of Austria

This award consists of fifteen classes, of which the second class was awarded to Dwight D. Eisenhower.

- Decoration for Services to the Liberation of Austria

=== Bahrain ===
- The Khalifiyyeh Order of Bahrain

Kingdom of Bahrain decorations were only rarely awarded to very senior U.S. officers. Most of those senior US officers in the United States Central Command as "end-of-tour" decorations.

=== Belgium ===
- Order of Leopold
- Order of the African Star
- Royal Order of the Lion
- Order of the Crown
- Order of Leopold II
- Military Cross
- Croix de Guerre

Belgian Orders were awarded to senior U.S. officers, while the War Cross was presented to any rank for valor during World War I & World War II. A Fourragère could also be awarded to individuals in units that were cited twice in the Order of the Day.

=== Bolivia ===
- Order of Naval Merit
- Order of Aeronautical Merit

Bolivian decorations are only rarely awarded to senior U.S. officers, most of those senior US officers have been in the United States Southern Command & United States Southern Command Air Forces Commander usually as "end-of-tour" decorations.

=== Brazil ===
- National Order of the Southern Cross
- Order of Defence Merit
- Order of Military Merit
- Order of Naval Merit
- Order of Aeronautical Merit
- Order of Rio Branco
- Santos-Dumont Merit Medal

Brazil's highest orders of merit were rarely awarded to senior U.S. officers, during World War II.

In the 21st century United States military most of those post World War II era presentations are still only awarded to senior US officers, most of those senior U.S. officers have been in the United States Southern Command & United States Southern Command Air Forces Commander usually as "end-of-tour" decorations.

=== Bulgaria ===
- Order of the Madara Horseman

Bulgarian decorations are only rarely awarded to very senior U.S. officers. Most of those were awarded to the United States European Command Commander usually as "end-of-tour" decorations.

=== Canada ===
- Order of Canada
- Order of Military Merit
- Meritorious Service Cross
- Meritorious Service Medal

Canadian decorations were mainly awarded during World War I and World War II. The Meritorious Service Cross and Meritorious Service Medal are currently the only Canadian awards still being awarded to US personnel today. Most of those are awarded to senior U.S. officers in the United States European Command, United States Northern Command or North American Aerospace Defense Command usually as "end-of-tour" decorations.

=== Chile ===
- Order of Merit

Chilean decorations were only rarely awarded to very senior U.S. officers during World War II.

=== Taiwan ===
- Order of National Glory
- Order of Blue Sky and White Sun
- Order of the Sacred Tripod
- Order of the Cloud and Banner

Taiwanese decorations were only rarely awarded to very senior U.S. officers during World War II.

=== Colombia ===
- Order of Boyaca
- Order of San Carlos
- Order of Military Merit Antonio Nariño
- Order of Military Merit José María Córdova
- Order of Naval Merit Admiral Padilla
- Air Force Cross of Aeronautical Merit
- Order of Health Merit Jose Fernandez Madrid

Colombian decorations are only rarely awarded to senior U.S. officers, most of those senior US officers have been in the United States Southern Command & United States Southern Command Air Forces Commander usually as "end-of-tour" decorations.

=== Croatia ===
- Order of Duke Trpimir
- Order of Duke Branimir

Croatian decorations are only rarely awarded to very senior U.S. officers. Most of those were awarded to senior US officers in the United States European Command usually as "end-of-tour" decorations.

=== Czechoslovakia / Czech Republic ===
- Order of the White Lion
- Cross of Merit of the Minister of Defence of the Czech Republic, First Class

Czech Order of the White Lion was only rarely awarded to very senior U.S. officers. The Czechoslovak War Cross was a little more commonly awarded to officers, than the Czech Order of the White Lion was, during World War I and World War II.

Cross of Merit of the Minister of Defense First Class are only rarely awarded to the United States European Command Commander usually as "end-of-tour" decorations.

=== Denmark ===
- Order of the Elephant
- Dancon March

Danish decorations were only rarely awarded to senior U.S. officers, during World War II.

=== Ecuador ===
- Order of Abdon Calderón

Ecuadorean decorations were only rarely awarded to senior U.S. officers, during World War II.

=== Egypt ===
- Order of the Nile
- Order of the Republic
- Egyptian Order of Merit

Egyptian decorations were only rarely awarded to very senior U.S. officers. Most of those senior U.S. officers in the United States Central Command as "end-of-tour" decorations.

=== El Salvador ===
- Gold Medal for Distinguished Service Medal

Salvadoran decorations are only rarely awarded to senior U.S. officers, most of those senior U.S. officers have been in the United States Southern Command & United States Southern Command Air Forces Commander usually as "end-of-tour" decorations.

=== Estonia ===
- Estonian Cross of Liberty (Military)
- Order of the White Star
- Military Order of the Cross of the Eagle

Estonian decorations are only rarely awarded to very senior U.S. officers. Most of those were awarded to senior U.S. officers in the United States European Command usually as "end-of-tour" decorations.

=== France ===
- Legion of Honour
- Order of Liberation
- Military Medal
- National Order of Merit
- Order of Academic Palms
- Medal of a liberated France
- French Commemorative Medal
- Medal of National Defense

Croix de Guerre (Cross of War)
Croix de guerre 1914–1918
Croix de guerre 1939–1945
Croix de guerre des Théatres d'Opérations Exterieures

Fourragère aux couleurs de la Croix de guerre 1914–1918

French decorations were presented to U.S. service members extensively during World War I and World War II. By far, the Croix de guerre was the most commonly bestowed decoration to United States service members of all ranks. Today, members of United States 5th Marine Regiment and 6th Marine Regiment, the Army's 2nd Infantry Division, the Army's 3rd Infantry Division, the Army's 3rd Squadron, 4th Cavalry Regiment, the 1st BN U.S. 28th Infantry Regiment, and the National Guard's 45th Infantry Brigade Separate Brigade are authorized to wear a Fourragère aux couleurs de la Croix de guerre, signifying the award of three Croix de guerre to each unit during World War I, but only while that individual is assigned to the unit. The wearing of the decoration is considered ceremonial and the fourragère is not entered as an official military award in permanent service records.

The Legion of Honour was awarded on June 15, 2015, SSgt Greggory Swarz. Staff Sgt. Greggory Swarz, with the 492nd Aircraft Maintenance Unit, received the Legion of Honor during the International Paris Air Show, according to U.S. Air Forces in Europe. Swarz pulled three French airmen out of a fire that erupted after a Greek F-16 crashed on Los Llanos Air Base, Spain, in January during a multinational exercise. The two Greek pilots and nine French airmen died.

The Legion of Honour was awarded on August 24, 2015, to two US Servicemen. Specialist Alek Skarlatos, a National Guardsman based in Oregon, and Airman First Class Spencer Stone, were awarded the Legion of Honour by French President Francois Hollande saying they "gave a lesson in courage" by subduing a heavily armed attacker on a high-speed train carrying 500 passengers to Paris on August 21, 2015.

The National Order of the Legion of Honor is mostly awarded to senior U.S. officers and Senior Enlisted Advisors in the United States European Command usually as "end-of-tour" decorations.

The National Order of Merit is awarded to lower ranking U.S. officers (Brigadier General - Major) and Senior Non-commissioned officers assigned to the United States European Command usually as "end-of-tour" decorations.

The French Commemorative Medal and the French Medal of National Defense can be awarded to any foreign military member who has served under French command. These are the only French medals still being awarded to U.S. personnel today.

There is an additional badge which can be earned by U.S. Service members upon successful participation and completion of the French Desert Commando Course in Djibouti, Africa. The course location is called Centre d'entraînement au combat d'Arta Plage, but more currently called CECAD (Centre d'entraînement au combat et d’aguerrissement de Djibouti). The badge is individually serialized to the service member who earned it.

=== Germany ===
- Bundeswehr Crosses & Medal of Honor

Bundeswehr Cross of Honour for Valour
Bundeswehr Gold Cross of Honor for Outstanding Deeds
Bundeswehr Cross of Honor

- Order of Merit of the Federal Republic of Germany
- German Sports Badge (Military)
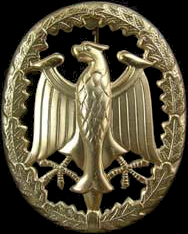
- German Armed Forces Military Proficiency Badge
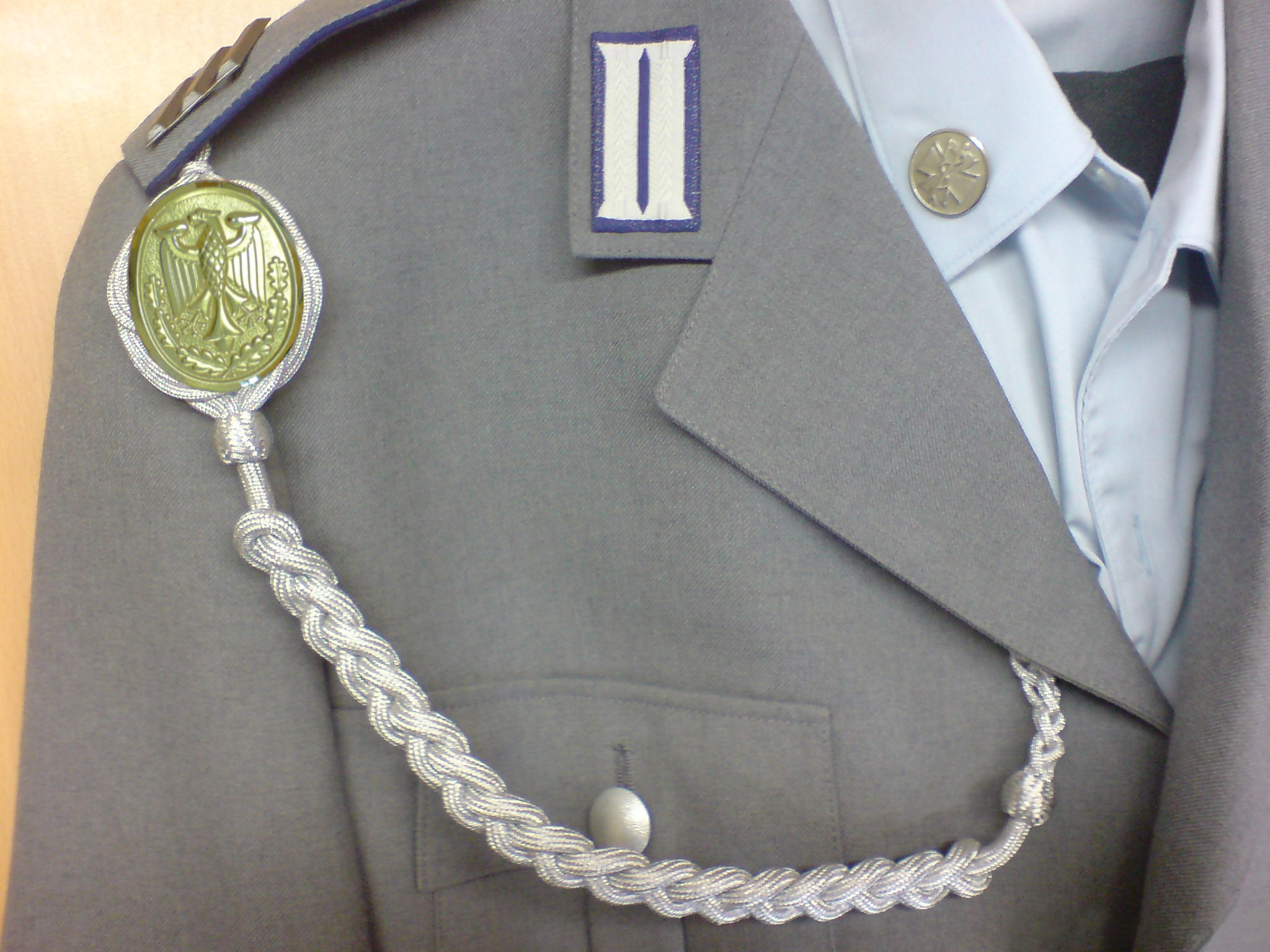
- German Armed Forces Marksmanship Badge

German decorations have been awarded to United States soldiers beginning as far back as the American Revolution. By the time of the First World War, German decorations had faded from the military memory of the United States and, during the actual conflict where Germany and America were on opposing sides, the wear of any German decoration by an American soldier would have been unthinkable.

The sole authorization of a Nazi decoration to U.S. personnel was in 1938 when the Order of the German Eagle was awarded to a small number of U.S. military personnel who had either served in Germany in a diplomatic posting or who had performed an act of service to the German state. The Order was entered in service records, but was never authorized for display on a United States uniform.

In the 21st-century United States military, the German Proficiency and Marksmanship Badges are far more commonly awarded, mainly to U.S. Army and Air Force personnel. The Order of Merit of the Federal Republic of Germany was last awarded to a US officer in 2015 and is today rarely awarded to only very senior U.S. officers. Most of those senior U.S. officers were in the United States European Command usually as "end-of-tour" decorations.

=== Greece ===
- Order of the Redeemer
- Order of George I
- Order of the Phoenix

Greek decorations were only very rarely awarded to very senior U.S. officers, during World War II.

=== Guatemala ===
- Order of the Quetzal
- Guatemalan Armed Forces Cross
- Cross of Military Merit (1st, 2nd and 3rd classes)

Guatemalan decorations are only rarely awarded to senior U.S. officers, most of those senior U.S. officers have been in the United States Southern Command & United States Southern Command Air Forces Commander usually as "end-of-tour" decorations. Generals MacArthur and Eisenhower were awarded the Cross of Military Merit, 1st Class after World War II.

=== Haiti ===
- National Order of Honour and Merit

Haitian decorations were only rarely awarded to senior U.S. officers, during World War II.

=== Honduras ===
- Honduran Armed Forces Cross

Honduran decorations are only rarely awarded to senior U.S. officers, most of those senior U.S. officers have been in the United States Southern Command & United States Southern Command Air Forces Commander usually as "end-of-tour" decorations.

=== Hungary ===
- Order of Merit of the Republic of Hungary

Hungarian decorations are only rarely awarded to very senior U.S. officers. Most of those were awarded to the United States European Command Commander usually as "end-of-tour" decorations.

=== Iceland ===
- Order of the Falcon

Icelandic decorations are only rarely awarded to very senior U.S. officers. Most of those were awarded to the United States European Command Commander usually as "end-of-tour" decorations.

=== Iraq ===
- Gold Award of the Iraqi Order of the Date Palm

Iraqi decorations are only awarded to very senior U.S. officers, most of those were awarded to the Multi-National Force - Iraq Commander as "end-of-tour" decorations.

To date the only person that has been allowed to wear any Iraqi award has been General Petraeus, Multi-National Force - Iraq Commander.

=== Israel ===
- Service in Israel Medal

The Service in Israel Medal is awarded to military attachés who serve at least two years in Israel upon the end of their assignment with the IDF. First instituted in 2007, it is still a somewhat rare decoration and there are certain restrictions regarding its display (or in some case, even its mention) for U.S. personnel stationed in other Middle Eastern Arab countries who are on unfriendly terms with Israel.

=== Italy ===
- Order of Merit of the Italian Republic
- Military Order of Italy
- Order of the Star of Italian Solidarity
- Order of the Crown of Italy
- Order of Saints Maurice and Lazarus
- War Cross
- Commemorative Italian East Africa Operations Medal

Italian decorations are only rarely awarded to very senior U.S. officers. The first presentations of Italian decorations to U.S. personnel were made in the months following World War II. This was mainly done to foster a new era of friendly relations between the US and Italy.

There are post-World War II presentations, but most of those medals are awarded to officers assigned in Italy. The Italian Orders are mainly awarded to senior U.S. officers in the United States European Command usually as "end-of-tour" decorations.

=== Japan ===
- Order of the Rising Sun
- Order of the Sacred Treasure

The first presentations of Japanese decorations to U.S. personnel were made in the months following World War II when the new Japanese government presented several decorations to senior U.S. military officers then in charge of the occupation force garrisoning Japan. This was mainly done to foster a new era of friendly relations between the US and Japan and to recognize the joint and allied nature which the new Japanese Self Defense Force would have with the United States armed forces. Some awards were discontinued after the Second World War, such as the Order of the Golden Kite.

Today Japanese decorations are only awarded to senior U.S. officers in the United States Pacific Command usually as "end-of-tour" decorations.

=== Kuwait ===
- Kuwait Liberation Medal

The Kuwait Liberation Medal was awarded to all U.S. service members who served in the theater of operations during the "Operation Desert Shield" and "Operation Desert Storm" phase of the Gulf War, between 2 August 1990 and 31 August 1993.

=== Lithuania ===
- Order of the Lithuanian Grand Duke Gediminas

Lithuanian decorations are only rarely awarded to very senior U.S. officers. But most of those were awarded to the United States European Command Commander usually as "end-of-tour" decorations.

=== Luxembourg ===
- Order of the Gold Lion of the House of Nassau
- Order of Adolphe of Nassau
- Order of the Oak Crown
- Order of Merit of the Grand Duchy of Luxembourg
- Military Medal
- Luxembourg War Cross
- Cross of Honour and Military Merit

Luxembourg decorations were presented mainly during World War II. There have been some rare post-World War II presentations, but most of those were awarded to the United States European Command Commander usually as "end-of-tour" decorations.

The Order of the Gold Lion of the House of Nassau was founded by Grand Ducal decree on 31 March 1858 by King-Grand Duke William III. The honour was to be shared between both branches of the House of Nassau, under agreement between William, King of the Netherlands and Grand Duke of Luxembourg, and Adolphe, Duke of Nassau and future Grand Duke of Luxembourg.

International March of Diekirch Medal, At the completion of 1 20 km march, 1 40 km march, or 2 40 km marches within 48 hours, personnel are entitled to wear the International March of Diekirch Medal.

=== Mexico ===
- Order of the Aztec Eagle
- Mexican Medal of Military Merit

Mexican decorations were mainly presented to very senior U.S. officers during World War II. There have been some rare post-World War II presentations, but these are mainly confined to the senior ranks of the U.S. military.

=== Montenegro ===
- Order of Prince Danilo I of Montenegro

Montenegrin decorations were only rarely awarded to very senior U.S. officers during World War I.

=== Morocco ===
- Order of Ouissam Alaouite

1913–1956 Order of Ouissan Alaouite
Order of Ouissam Alaouite

The Order of Ouissam Alaouite was awarded mainly to United States military officers who had served on the Operation Torch planning staff during World War II. In the film Patton, George C. Scott plays then Major General George S. Patton who is awarded the Grand Cross of the Order of Ouissam Alaouite at the start of the film. There have been some rare post-World War II presentations, but these are mainly confined to the senior ranks of the U.S. military.

=== The Netherlands ===
- Military Order of William
- Order of the Netherlands Lion
- Order of Orange Nassau
- Order of the Gold Lion of the House of Nassau
- Cross for the Four Day Marches
- Dutch Military Proficiency Badge

The Dutch presented awards to U.S. service members mainly during World War II; the Honorary Sabre was very rarely awarded to very senior US officers. There have been some rare post-World War II presentations, but most of those were awarded to the United States European Command Commander, usually as "end-of-tour" decorations.

The Order of the Gold Lion of the House of Nassau was founded by Grand Ducal decree on 31 March 1858 by King-Grand Duke William III. The honour was to be shared between both branches of the House of Nassau, under agreement between William, King of the Netherlands and Grand Duke of Luxembourg, and Adolphe, Duke of Nassau and future Grand Duke of Luxembourg.

The Cross for the Four Day Marches, also known as the Holland Four Day Event Cross, is currently earned by U.S. military personnel who complete the annual event.

=== Nicaragua ===
- Nicaraguan Cross of Valor
- Nicaraguan Medal of Military Merit

Nicaraguan medals were somewhat commonly awarded to U.S. Marine and Navy personnel, during the Nicaraguan Campaigns of 1912 & 1933.

=== Norway ===
==== Modern Authorized Awards ====
- Norwegian Order of Merit
- Norwegian Defense Intelligence Service Medal
- Norwegian Army Medal of Merit
- Norwegian Defense International Service Medal

==== Norwegian Skill Badges ====
These decorations are most often divided in three classes of badges: bronze, silver and gold. The ribbon denotes the gold:

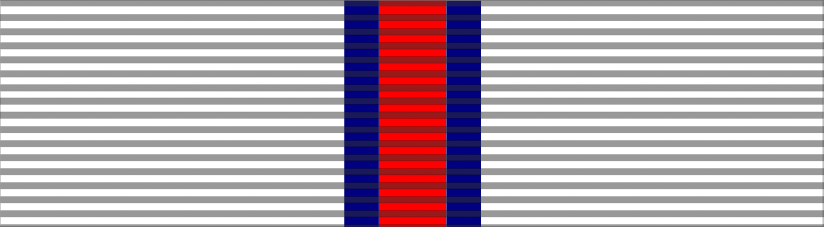
- The Military Skiing Badge
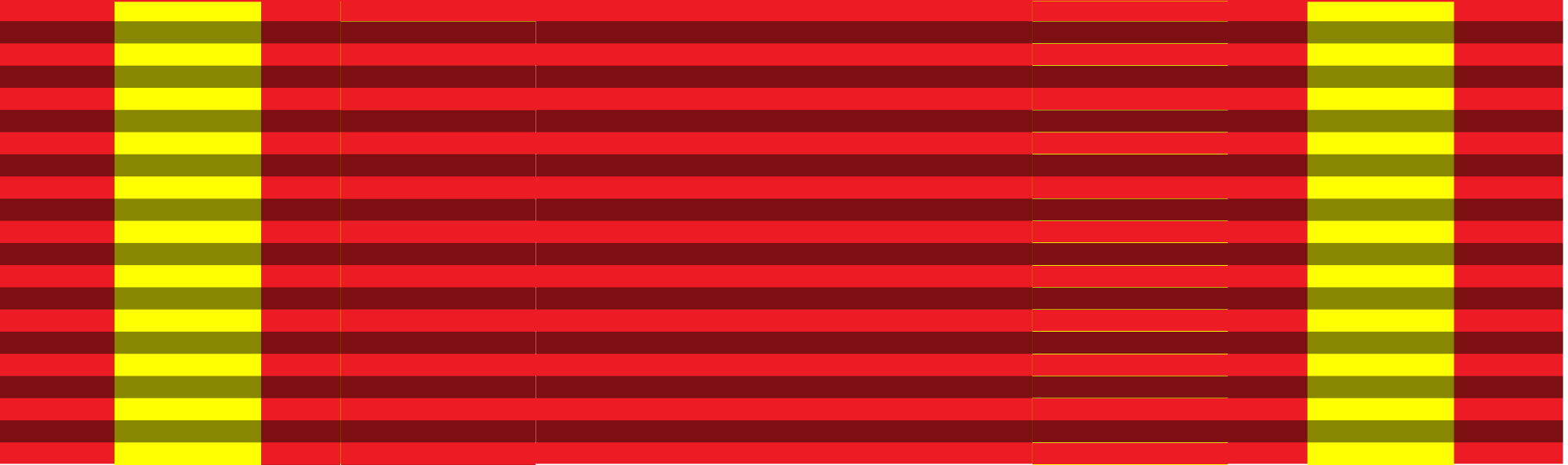
- The Military Sharp Shooting Badge
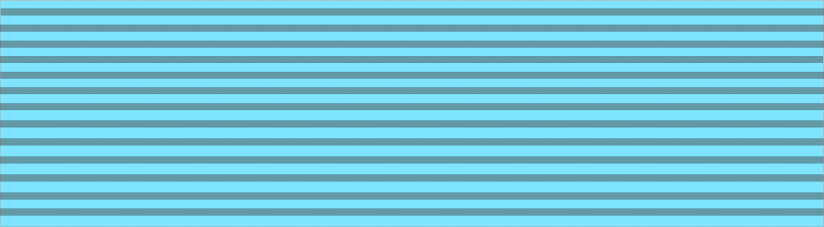
- The Military Marching Badge (Ribbon for Gold)
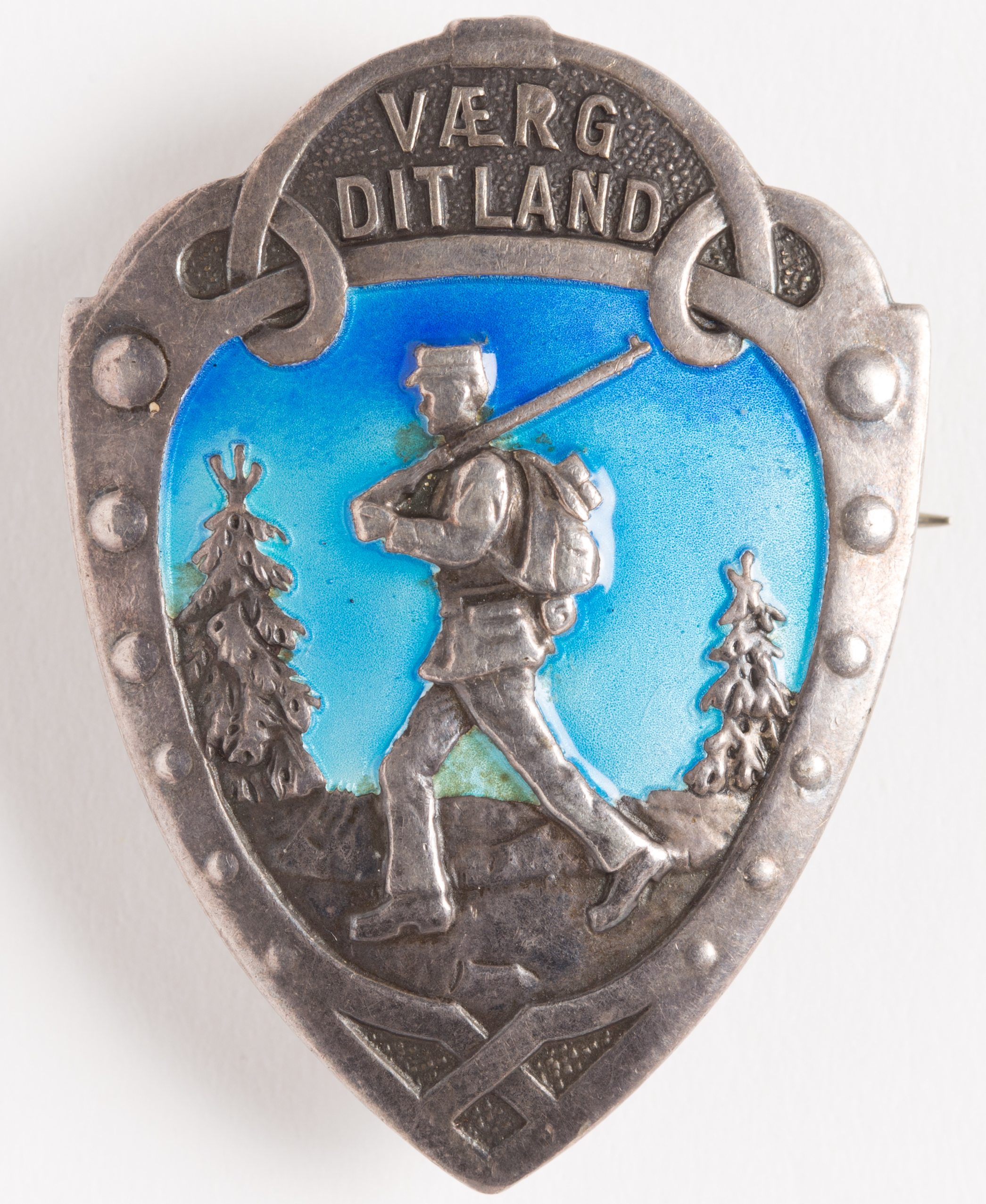
- The Military Marching Badge
- Norwegian Military Basic Parachute Badge

===== Historical Awards =====
- War Cross with sword
- Order of St. Olav
- War Medal

Norwegian decorations were only rarely awarded to very senior U.S. officers, during World War I & World War II.

The War Cross is Norway's highest ranking decoration for gallantry. It was so rarely awarded to US military personnel, that only two U.S. officers have ever received it to date, CAPT Alfred Carini and LTC Keith N. Allen.

The Royal Order of St. Olav is no longer awarded to foreign citizens, except for state leaders and royals. Foreign citizens may now be awarded the Royal Norwegian Order of Merit.

=== Pakistan ===
- Nishan-e-Pakistan

Pakistani decorations were only rarely awarded to very senior U.S. officers during World War II. There have been some rare post-World War II presentations, but these are mainly confined to the senior ranks of the U.S. military.

=== Panama ===
- Order of Manuel Amador Guerrero
- Order of Vasco Núñez de Balboa

=== Paraguay ===
- Paraguay National Order of Merit

Paraguayan decorations were only rarely awarded to very senior U.S. officers during World War II.

=== Peru ===
- Order of the Sun
- Order of Aeronautical Merit

Peruvian decorations were only rarely awarded to very senior U.S. officers during World War II. There have been some rare post-World War II presentations, but these are mainly confined to the senior ranks of the U.S. military.

In the 21st century United States military, the awarding of Peruvian decorations are still only rarely awarded to senior US officers, most of those senior US officers have been in the United States Southern Command & United States Southern Command Air Forces Commander usually as "end-of-tour" decorations.

=== Philippines ===
- Philippine Medal of Valor
- Distinguished Conduct Star
- Philippine Legion of Honor
- Philippines Presidential Unit Citation
- Philippine Defense Medal
- Philippine Liberation Medal
- Philippine Independence Medal

The Philippine Medal of Valor, Distinguished Conduct Star and Philippine Legion of Honor were only rarely awarded to very senior U.S. officers, during World War II. The Philippine Defense Medal, Philippine Liberation Medal and Philippine Independence Medal were commonly awarded to soldiers and sailors of all ranks during World War II.

=== Poland ===
- Order of the White Eagle
- Order Wojenny Virtuti Militari
- Order of Polonia Restituta
- Order of Merit of the Republic of Poland
- Order of the Cross of Grunwald
- Cross of Valour
- Cross of Merit with Swords
- Iraq Star
- Afghanistan Star
- Polish Army Medal

Polish decorations were first presented to U.S. senior military leaders in the aftermath of World War II as a measure of thanking the Allies for liberating Poland from Nazi Germany.

When Poland fell behind the Iron Curtain, awards to U.S. service members all but ceased. In the 21st century, with Poland now a member in NATO, awards have resumed to U.S. personnel, but most of those were awarded to the United States European Command Commander usually as "end-of-tour" decorations.

The Iraq Star has been awarded to U.S. officers who served with Polish forces in Iraq (MND-CS).
The Afghanistan Star has been awarded to U.S. officers who served with Polish forces in Afghanistan (as part of the ISAF).

The Polish Army Medal has been awarded by Minister of National Defense to foreign nationals, military or civilian, who rendered merit in cooperation between the Polish Armed forces and the armed forces of other countries, in particular by supporting peacekeeping operations of the Polish Armed forces, rendered merit in the area of cooperation of international military units including Polish units, contributed to the growth of military potential of the Polish Armed Forces or to dissemination of Polish military history or traditions abroad.

=== Portugal ===
- Order of Aviz
- Grand Cross of the Military Merit Medal

Portuguese Order of Aviz was awarded to very senior U.S. officers, during World War II. Most of the medals awarded now in the 21st century United States military, are to the United States European Command Commander usually as "end-of-tour" decorations.

=== Republic of Korea (South Korea) ===
- Order of National Security Merit

Tong-il Medal
Gugseon Medal
Cheon-Su Medal
Sam-il Medal
Gwangbog Medal

- Order of Military Merit

Taeguk Cordon Medal
Eulji Cordon Medal
Chungmu Cordon Medal
Hwarang Cordon Medal
Inheon Cordon Medal

- South Korean Presidential Unit Citation
- Korean War Service Medal

South Korean decorations were first awarded to U.S. service members during the Korean War.

The award of Korean medals in the 21st century is mainly confined to senior U.S. military leaders attached to either USFK or CNFK.

=== Republic of Vietnam (South Vietnam) ===
Senior Leadership awards

- National Order of Vietnam
- Vietnam Distinguished Service Order

Vietnam Army Distinguished Service Order, 1st Class
Vietnam Army Distinguished Service Order, 2nd Class
Vietnam Navy Distinguished Service Order, 1st Class
Vietnam Navy Distinguished Service Order, 2nd Class
Vietnam Air Force Distinguished Service Order, 1st Class
Vietnam Air Force Distinguished Service Order, 2nd Class

Individual awards

- Vietnam Military Merit Medal
- Vietnam Gallantry Cross
- Vietnam Civil Actions Medal
- Vietnam Campaign Medal

Unit awards

- Vietnam Presidential Unit Citation
- Vietnam Gallantry Cross Unit Citation
- Vietnam Civil Actions Unit Citation

Other awards

- Vietnam Armed Forces Honor Medal
- Vietnam Training Service Medal
- Vietnam Staff Service Medal
- Vietnam Air Gallantry Cross

Vietnam Air Gallantry Cross with Gold Wing Ribbon
Vietnam Air Gallantry Cross with Silver Wing Ribbon
Vietnam Air Gallantry Cross with Bronze Wing Ribbon

- Vietnam Navy Gallantry Cross

Vietnam Navy Gallantry Cross with Gold Anchor Ribbon
Vietnam Navy Gallantry Cross with Silver Anchor Ribbon
Vietnam Navy Gallantry Cross with Bronze Anchor Ribbon

- Vietnam Special Service Medal

Republic of Vietnam military awards (South Vietnam decorations) were first awarded to United States service members beginning around 1964. The Vietnamese Gallantry Cross and the Vietnamese Civil Actions Medal were awarded to some U.S. servicemen for heroism and meritorious service. The National Order was awarded to some U.S. military officers who were killed in action and the Military Merit Medal was awarded to some U.S. non-officers who were killed in action. The National Order and Distinguished Service Order was awarded to some senior U.S. military personnel. The Campaign Medal were commonly awarded to all U.S. military personnel and the remainder of the decorations were awarded with different frequency between the U.S. service branches and amongst officer/non-officer personnel.

=== Romania ===
- Order of Michael the Brave
- Order of the Star of Romania
- Romanian Order of Merit Ribbon

Romanian decorations were only rarely awarded to very senior U.S. officers, during World War I and World War II. There have been some rare post-World War II presentations, but these are mainly confined to the senior ranks of the U.S. military.

=== Saudi Arabia ===
- Kuwait Liberation Medal
- Order of Abdulaziz al Saud
- King Faisal Award, 2d Class

The Saudi Arabian Kuwait Liberation Medal was a little less commonly awarded to all U.S. service members, it was awarded only during the dates of 17 January 1991 and 28 February 1991 with in-theater service of the Gulf War.

=== Singapore ===
- Darjah Utama Bakti Cemerlang
- Pingat Jasa Gemilang

Singaporean decorations are very rarely awarded to only senior U.S. officers, at the Joint Chiefs of Staff level.

=== Slovakia ===
- Commemorative Medal of the Minister of Defense of the Slovak Republic First Class

Slovak decorations are only rarely awarded to very senior U.S. officers. Most of those were awarded to the United States European Command Commander usually as "end-of-tour" decorations.

=== Soviet Union / Russia ===
- Order of Victory
- Order of Suvorov
- Order of Kutuzov
- Order of the Patriotic War

Soviet decorations were only rarely awarded to very senior U.S. officers during World War II. Due to the different ribbon bar sizing between US and USSR decorations, Soviet ribbons were also impractical for daily wear on United States uniforms. In addition, by the 1950s at the start of the Cold War, most U.S. officers who had been awarded such medals during World War II simply chose to stop wearing them.

=== Spain ===
- Grand Cross of Military Merit (Red)
- Grand Cross of Naval Merit (Red)
- Grand Cross of Aeronautical Merit (Red)
- Grand Cross of the Order of Merit of the Civil Guard

Spanish decorations were only rarely awarded to senior U.S. officers during World War II.

=== Sweden ===
- Order of the Sword
- Order of the Polar Star

(1748–1975, 2023-Present) Order of the Polar Star
(1975 – 2023) Order of the Polar Star

Swedish decorations were only rarely awarded to senior U.S. officers during World War II.

=== Thailand ===
- Order of the White Elephant
- Order of the Crown of Thailand

Thai decorations are very rarely awarded to only senior U.S. officers, at the Joint Chiefs of Staff level.

=== Tunisia ===
- Order of Nichan Iftikhar

Tunisian decorations were only rarely awarded to senior U.S. officers during World War II.

=== United Arab Emirates ===
- Military Merit Order Commander

UAE decorations were only rarely awarded to very senior U.S. officers during the Gulf War. Most of those senior U.S. officers in the United States Central Command as "end-of-tour" decorations.

=== United Kingdom ===
- Victoria Cross
- George Cross

Orders of Chivalry

- Order of the Bath
- Order of Merit
- Order of St Michael and St George
- Royal Victorian Order
- Order of the British Empire
- Order of St John

Military Decorations

- Distinguished Service Order
- Conspicuous Gallantry Cross
- Distinguished Service Cross
- Military Cross
- Distinguished Flying Cross
- Air Force Cross

Campaign Medals

- Africa Star
- Pacific Star
- Operational Service Medal for Afghanistan
- Iraq Medal

Britain's highest award for gallantry the Victoria Cross has only been awarded to one U.S. military member, the U.S. Unknown Soldier was awarded the Victoria Cross, on November 11, 1921.

United Kingdom decorations were awarded extensively to U.S. service members during both the First World War and World War II. The orders of chivalry were reserved mainly for senior U.S. military leaders. The remaining decorations were awarded frequently amongst the entire enlisted and officer corps of the U.S. military. The Distinguished Flying Cross was a common decoration for those Americans attached to the Eagle Squadrons; when some of those personnel transferred back to the United States Army Air Forces after America entered the war, the British DFC became a fairly common sight on U.S. uniforms during that time period.

In the 21st century United States military, the awarding of British decorations to U.S. service members is still somewhat common, most often to officers assigned in England or other various capacities with NATO European based defense groups.

=== Uruguay ===
- Aeronautical Merit Medal
- Medal of Military Merit

Uruguayean decorations are only rarely awarded to senior U.S. officers, most of those senior U.S. officers have been in the United States Southern Command & United States Southern Command Air Forces Commander usually as "end-of-tour" decorations.

=== Vatican City ===
- Pian Order
- Order of St Gregory the Great
- Order of St. Sylvester
- Order of the Holy Sepulchre

Vatican awards of Pontifical Equestrian Orders of Chivalry are made by the Vatican Secretary of State in the name of the Sovereign Pontiff and may be accepted and retained by U.S. Military personnel as honorary merit awards and not for wear of the U.S. Military Uniform.

=== Yugoslavia ===
- Order of the White Eagle

The Order of the White Eagle was only rarely awarded to very senior U.S. officers, during World War II.

== See also ==
Awards and decorations of the United States Armed Forces

- Inter-service awards and decorations of the United States military
- Awards and decorations of the United States Air Force
- Awards and decorations of the United States Army
- Awards and decorations of the United States Coast Guard
- Military awards of the United States Department of the Navy
- United States military award devices
- Obsolete military awards of the United States
- Awards and decorations of the National Guard
- Awards and decorations of the State Defense Forces
- Parachutist badge

Awards and decorations of the United States government

- Merchant Marine
- Awards and decorations of the Public Health Service
- Awards and decorations of the National Oceanic and Atmospheric Administration
- Civilian decorations of the United States
- Military decorations of the Cold War
- Awards and decorations of the Vietnam War
