= German Armed Forces Badge of Marksmanship =

- Schützenschnur
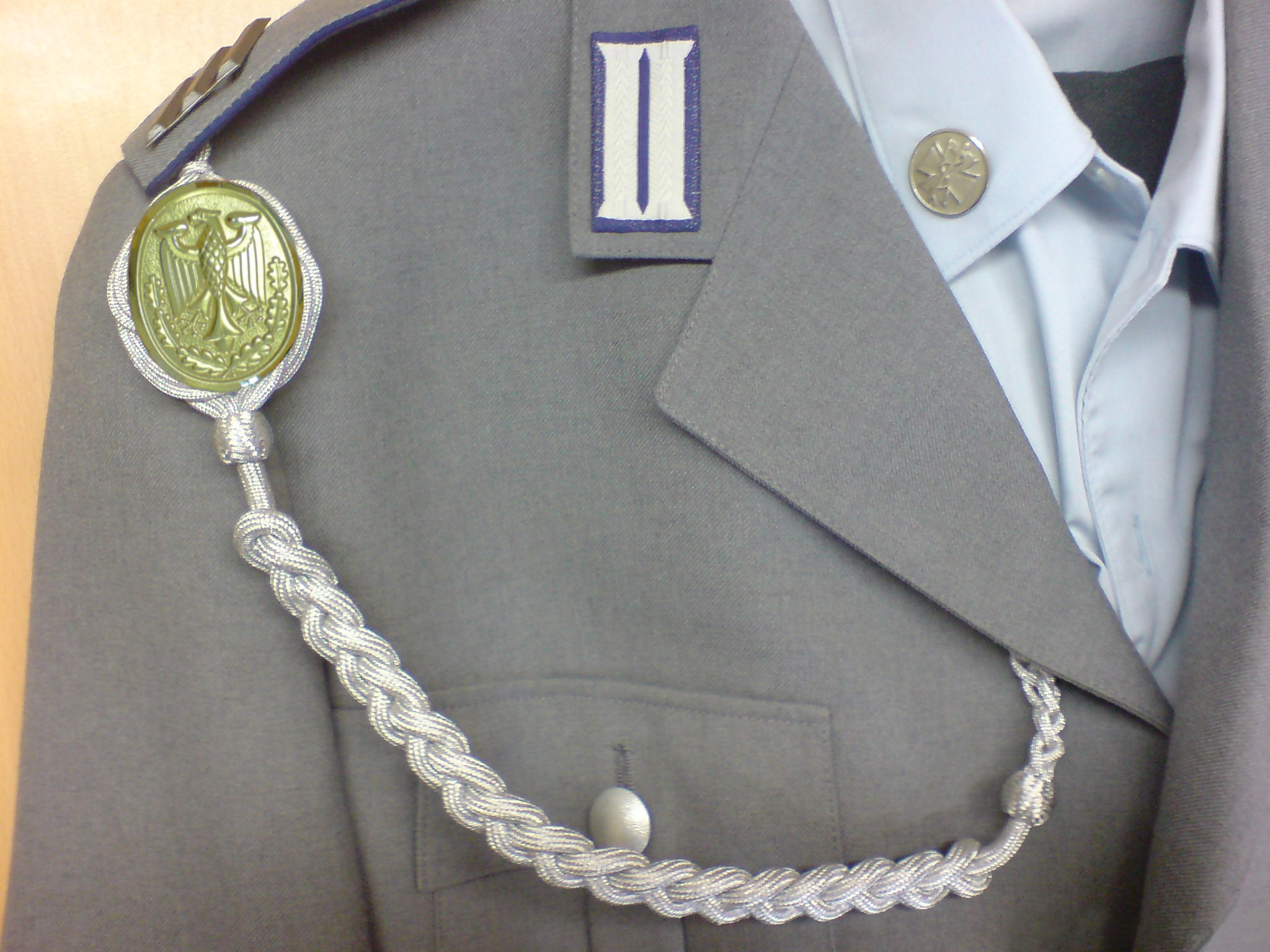
- Type: Military Lanyard
- Awarded for: Marksmanship
- Description: Three classes: gold, silver and bronze
- Presented by: the Federal Republic of Germany
- Eligibility: Soldiers of the German armed forces and Allied nations
- Status: Currently awarded
- Established: 27 January 1894 (historic); 16 July 1954 (current)

The German Armed Forces Badge for Weapons Proficiency (German: Schützenschnur) is a decoration of the Bundeswehr, the armed forces of the Federal Republic of Germany.

The decoration is awarded to German military personnel of all grades but is only allowed to be worn by enlisted members. The German armed forces regulations point out that "the Schützenschnur is a decoration for weapons proficiency for enlisted soldiers." Officers can receive the award, although it is not currently authorized to be worn on their uniforms. Foreign military members may also be awarded the badge. The German military regulation on officers still applies, permitting only enlisted members to wear the badge.

== History ==
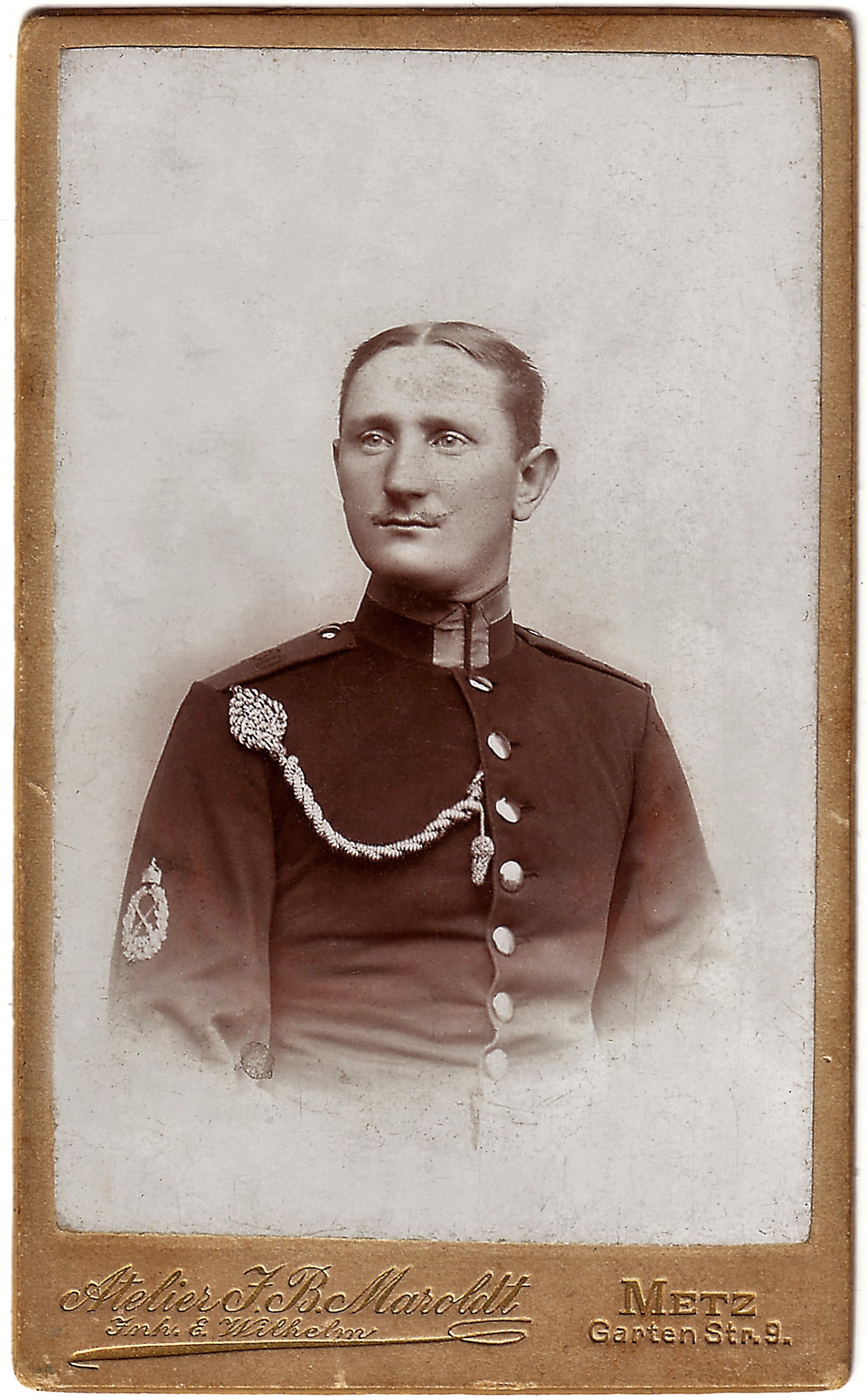
Corporal from a Prussian infantry regiment wearing a Schützenschnur in 1894

The history of the Schützenschnur dates back to the Eighty Years' War where Spanish troops were ordered to hang any Dutch person who carried a musket. Therefore Spanish musketeers began to carry ropes which were often carried over one shoulder. Awarding a cord as a decoration began in the early 18th century in Prussia under Frederick William I of Prussia.

With the reorganization of the Prussian Army under Gerhard von Scharnhorst the Schützenschnur became an official military award.

The Reichswehr and later the Wehrmacht adapted the Schützenschnur as an award for proficiency in marksmanship. The award existed in 12 different levels with different versions for infantry and armored troops.

In 1957 the Bundesgrenzschutz introduced the Schützenschnur.

A similar decoration existed within the East German National People's Army and the Border Troops of the German Democratic Republic.

== Requirements for qualification ==
To earn the award one must successfully shoot weapons from all three classes:

1. Pistol (current service pistol is the P8)
2. Rifle (there are several rifles in service; the standard rifle is the G36)
3. Heavy weapon (for example machine gun (MG3) or antitank launcher (Panzerfaust 3)

The awarded grade is determined by the lowest weapon qualification (e.g. if you qualify all gold and one bronze, you are awarded the bronze.).

== Classes/grades ==
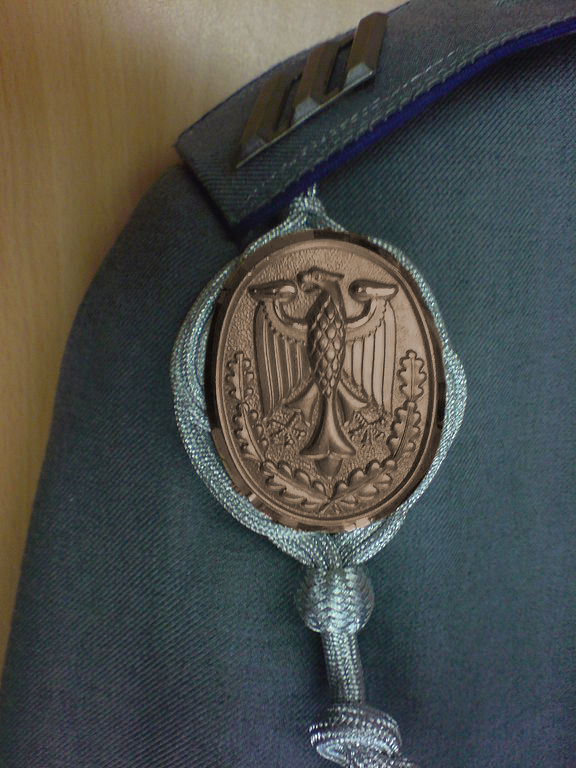
Class 1 (Bronze)

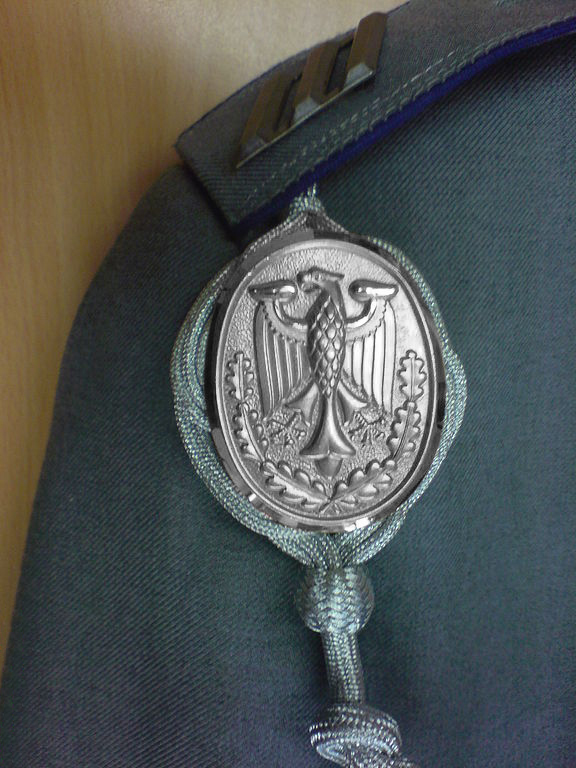
Class 2 (Silver)

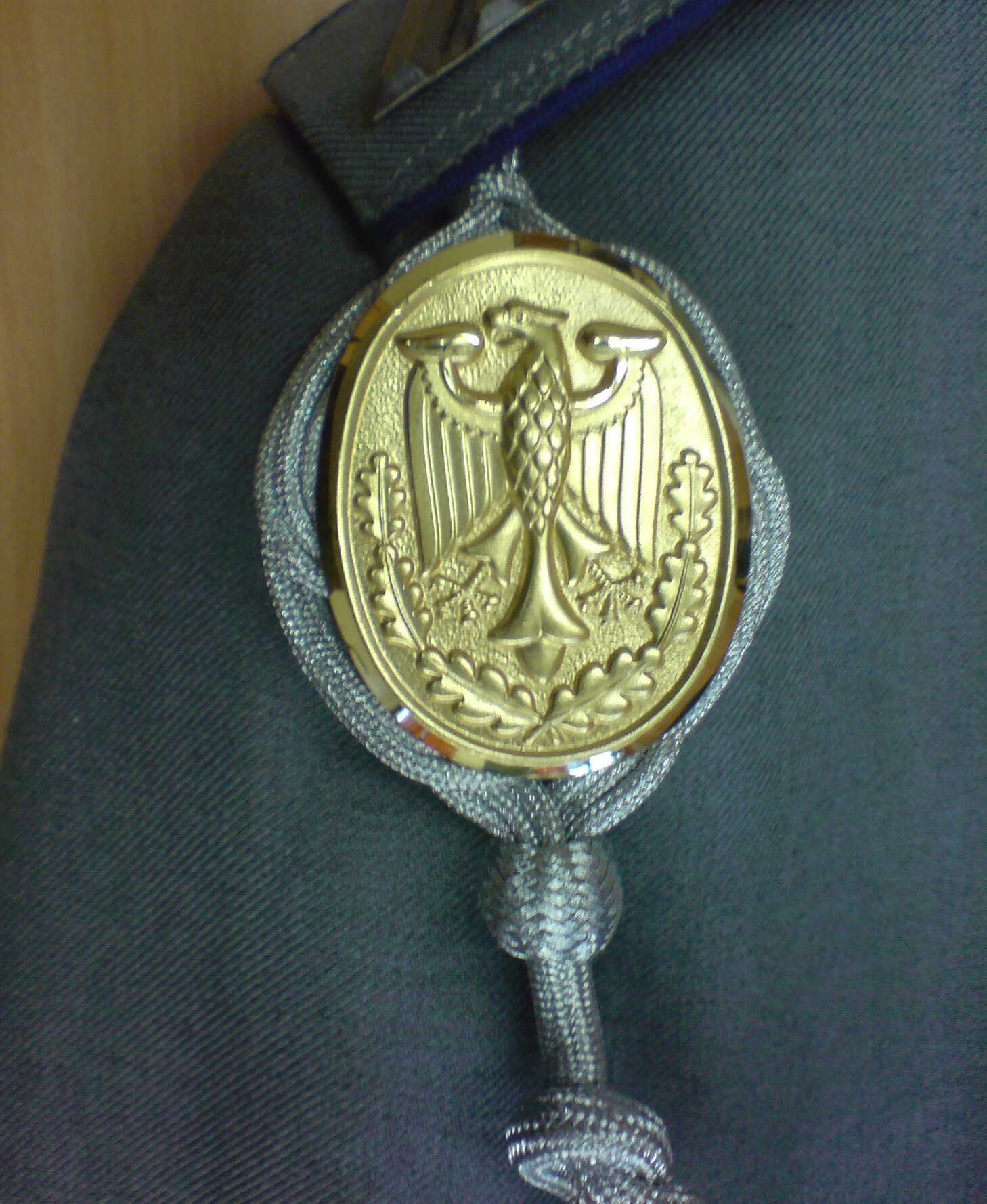
Class 3 (Gold)

- German Armed Forces Badge for Weapons Proficiency in Bronze (Schützenschnur in Bronze) is awarded for shooting with the rifle and the pistol and the machine pistol with at least two scores in at least bronze (medical service at least one score in at least bronze). The admissible categories of weapon depends on the branch of the service member. The category of heavy weapons (most commonly the machine gun) is not mandatory to earn the bronze badge. The rifle, pistol and machine pistol are the only weapons that require minimally score of bronze.
- German Armed Forces Badge for Weapons Proficiency in Silver (Schützenschnur in Silber) is awarded for shooting by a service member with his designated "light" weapon (pistol, rifle or machine pistol) and one of the "heavy" weapons (machine gun or Panzerfaust) with all scores at least in silver.
- German Armed Forces Badge for Weapons Proficiency in Gold (Schützenschnur in Gold) is awarded for shooting by a service member with his designated "light" weapon (pistol, rifle or machine pistol) and one of the "heavy" weapons (machine gun or Panzerfaust) with all scores at least in gold.

The number of exercises depends on the chosen (or ordered) weapon and the grade of the badge. A member of the medical branch, for example, can reach the bronze badge by two exercises with the pistol. A paratrooper needs for the gold badge one exercise with the G36 rifle (or three with the G3 rifle) AND two with the MG3 machine gun (or two with the Panzerfaust).

The German Armed Forces Badge for Weapons Proficiency in Gold is awarded with the number 5, 10, 15 etc. for annually retaking.

=== Design ===
- The Army and Air Forces version of the award is a silver colored rope with a round metal badge on a flat end near the top of the rope, on its center it displays the German eagle surrounded by a wreath of oak leaves.
- The Navy version of the award looks the same except the rope's color is navy blue.

== Wear by allied military forces ==
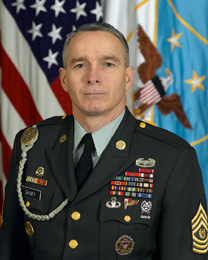
CSM William Joseph Gainey with Bundeswehr Schützenschnur

=== Correct wear on the US Army uniform ===
In the United States military, the German Armed Forces Badge for Weapons Proficiency (Schützenschnur) is one of the few pre-approved foreign awards, requiring no individual approval request to be forwarded up the serviceman's chain of command to the United States Senate for acceptance. Occasion and manner of wear of the Schützenschnur are governed by the individual services' uniform regulations, which additionally specify the placement of the concealed button on the uniform with which to affix the Schützenschnur's rope.

The German Marksmanship Award (Schuetzenschnur) is authorized for wear only by enlisted personnel. Officers may accept, but may not wear the Schuetzenschnur. If authorized, personnel wear the award on the right side of the uniform coat, with the upper portion attached under the center of the epaulette, and the bottom portion attached under the lapel to a button mounted specifically for wear of this award.

=== Correct wear on the US Air Force uniform ===
In the United States Air Force, approval needs to be obtained prior to wear on the uniform.

Air Force members who have been told a foreign nation has made formal offer of a decoration to them may participate in a formal presentation ceremony and receive the decoration when accepting the award is not prejudicial to military or national interest. The receipt of the foreign decoration in this manner does not constitute official acceptance. To gain official acceptance, the recipient must forward a request to accept and retain the decoration to the appropriate approval authority.

Manner of wear, when approved, is the same for USAF members as it is for US Army members, as outlined above.

Wear only one foreign badge. When wearing more than one foreign decoration (miniature medal), wear them in the order earned. Do not wear foreign decorations unless wearing other US military decorations and service medals. When authorized more than one decoration, wear them in the order earned. If authorized more than one foreign decoration from the same country, wear them in the order the country prescribes. On special occasions and as a matter of courtesy to a given country, Airman may wear the decorations of that country ahead of all other foreign decorations.

== See also ==
- Awards and decorations of the German Armed Forces
- German Armed Forces Badge for Military Proficiency
- Authorized foreign decorations of the United States military
- The Military Marching Badge (Norwegian Foot March)
