= NFM (disambiguation) =

NFM may refer to:

- Narrowband FM, part of the frequency modulation
- National Forum of Music, a music venue located in Wrocław, Poland
- Nebraska Furniture Mart, a home furnishing store in North America
- Nederlands Fotomuseum, a photography museum in Rotterdam
- Nippon Flour Mills, a Japanese company which produces flour related products
- North Fork Mountain, a quartzite-capped mountain ridge in the Ridge and Valley
- Netherlands Fractal Pattern, a Dutch military camouflage pattern
- National Folk Museum of Korea, a national museum in Korea
- The Military Marching Badge (Norwegian Foot March), a Proficiency Badge of the Norwegian Armed Forces.
