= Dancon/Irak =

Danish military contingent during the Iraq War

- Active: 2003–2007
- Disbanded: August 2007
- Country: Denmark
- Type: Ground forces
- Size: 545 (peak)
- Engagements: Iraq War

Commanders
- Commanders: See § Commanders

Dancon/Irak (short for Danish Contingent/Irak) was a Danish ground contingent deployed to Iraq from June 2003 to July 2007, during the Iraq War.

== History ==
Dancon/Irak was established on 21 March 2003, and activated on 23 April of the same year. Dancon's units were subordinate to Multi-National Division (South East) ("MND (SE)"), which is responsible for the southern provinces of Al Basrah, Maysan, Dhi Qar and Al Muthanna in Iraq. MND (SE) was a British-run division containing units from several other European nations.

Dancon arrived in Kuwait on 2 June 2003, and reached its Area of Responsibility (AOR) in Iraq on 6 June 2003. After an initial setup phase, Dancon/Irak took official charge of its AOR on 12 June 2003 during a ceremonial reception in CIMIC-house, Al-Qurna, from the British Joint NBC Regiment.

The formation was initially 380 personnel, and 42 more were added in July/August 2003. By February 2005, the contingent consisted of approximately 545 soldiers. Danish troops were rotated every six months, and each contingent had a slightly different composition of units and men. By March 2007, its size had fallen to about 460.

A 53-man Lithuanian unit, designated LITCON, had been attached to Dancon since June 2003. They were withdrawn along with the Danes by August 2007. Additionally, Denmark temporarily deployed around 35 soldiers as guards for the United Nations presence in Baghdad, and as of 2005, had sent ten instructors and seven guards to serve under the NATO Training Mission in Iraq.

The 601st Iraqi National Guard Battalion was briefly under Dancon command, as was a detachment of about 130 British troops in February 2004, due to the expansion of their AOR.

The majority of the Danish troops deployed to Iraq withdrew at the end of July 2007 and were replaced by a 55-member contingent, known as HELDAT (under the command of Lieutenant Colonel Jannik Skov), whose task was to operate a unit of four helicopters in support of British and Iraqi forces.

=== Composition of Dancon/Irak ===
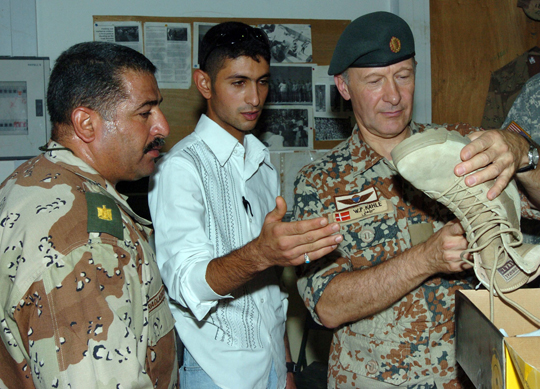
Denmark Army Col. Werner P. Kahle studies a pair of boots that will be worn by an Iraqi Army soldier. Kahle visited Iraqi Army Gen. Sabah, head of the Regional Support Unit in Kirkush, 8 August 2007. U.S. Army photo by Spc. Jennifer Fulk

Each contingent of Dancon consisted of the following units:

- A Staff & Logistics Company
- A Mechanized Infantry Company
- A Light Recon Company
- A Military Police Detachment
- A Medical Platoon
- NSE Unit (National Support Element)
- STOF MND (SC) (Liaison Personnel)
- STOF MND (SE) (Liaison Personnel)

Also attached in the invasion phase:

- Jægerkorps detachment (Special Forces) (briefly attached again in April 2007)
- Engineer detachment (briefly attached again in late 2004)

=== Camps and Locations ===
==== Camp Eden ====
Camp Eden was located about 9 km north west of Al-Qurnah, near Glory Canal. The camp was built in June/July 2003 by the then attached Engineer Company. Covering around 500,000 m^{2}, it was built on top of one of Saddam Hussein's military installations, previously destroyed. The camp was nicknamed "Ørken Fortet" (Desert Fortress) by the locals. Its radio-communications code name was "Amsterdam". Camp Eden was disassembled in August–September 2004 when Dancon's AOR doubled in size due to an expansion further South. Dancon moved to Camp Danevang, located inside Shaiba Logistics Base.

==== Cimic-House ====
Cimic-House, located in Al-Qurnah, is a former Ba'ath Party building. It was the site of the Danish Civil-Military Co-operation (CIMIC) from June 2003 to May 2004 when it was handed over to the Iraqis.

==== Camp Yggdrasil ====
Camp Yggdrasil was located on Shaiba Logistics Base, about 15 km west of Basra. It was built during June/July 2003. The home of the National Support Element (NSE), the camp was later incorporated into the newly built Camp Danevang. Yggdrasil, from which the camp was named, is a mythological tree between heaven and hell in Norse mythology.

==== Camp Danevang ====
Camp Danevang, located on the Shaiba Logistics Base, was officially handed over by the construction company on 18 October 2004. However, it had already been in use since September of that year, following the closure of Camp Eden.

The units responsible for the construction of the camp were the Army Operational Command (Hærens Operative Kommando) and the Defence Construction Service (Forsvarets Bygningstjeneste). The foundations of the camp were built by Danish Camp Supply A/S and Iraqi Basra Engineering. The construction of the actual camp and all the associated requirements, including the transportation of all equipment from Camp Eden, was done by Dancon itself with help from an attached Engineer Detachment and the Danish International Logistical Center.

It was decided in June 2004 to reposition Dancon to this location following the doubling of Dancon's AOR (now about 20,000 km^{2}, nearly extending all the way down to Kuwait), thus allowing Dancon to be more centralized in its AOR. Camp Danevang was handed over to the Iraqi authorities in March 2007.

==== Camp Einherjer ====
In January 2007 Dancon relocated to Camp Einherjer, located on the British Basra Air Station, west of Basra. The camp was built between November 2006 and January 2007. With the withdrawal of both Dancon and its smaller successor HELDAT from Southern Iraq, the fate of camp Einherher is unclear (presumably, it has been transferred to Iraqi forces).

== Subordination ==
While Dancon was subordinate to Multi-National Division (South-East), the British division that ran MND (SE) often changed, meaning that control of Dancon switched between various units.

- June 2003 – ?, British 7th Armoured Brigade / 1st UK Armoured Division
- September 2003 – ?, British 19th Mechanised Brigade / 3rd UK Mechanised Division
- February 2004 – ?, British 20th Armoured Brigade / 1st UK Armoured Division
- ? – May 2006, British 7th Armoured Brigade / 1st UK Armoured Division
- May 2006 – ?, British 20th Armoured Brigade / 1st UK Armoured Division

== Commanders ==
- Dancon/Irak1 (May 2003 – October 2003) – Colonel Niels H. Bundsgaard
- Dancon/Irak2 (October 2003 – 13 February 2004) – Colonel Henrik Højris Friis
- Dancon/Irak3 (13 February 2004 – 4 August 2004) – Colonel Henrik Flach
- Dancon/Irak3 (4 August 2004 – 23 August 2004) – Lieutenant Colonel Poul-Erik Andersen
- Dancon/Irak4 (23 August 2004 – 18 February 2005) – Colonel John Dalby
- Dancon/Irak5 (18 February 2005 – 20 August 2005) – Colonel Henrik Lyhne
- Dancon/Irak6 (20 August 2005 – 16 February 2006) – Colonel Flemming Toft
- Dancon/Irak7 (16 February 2006 – 20 August 2006) – Colonel Henrik Berg
- Dancon/Irak8 (20 August 2006 – 16 February 2007) – Colonel Per Mikkelsen
- Dancon/Irak9 (16 February 2007 - 2 August 2007) - Colonel Kim Bruno Petersen

== Fatalities during Dancon/Irak ==
Since 2003, seven Danish soldiers have lost their lives in Iraq.

- 16 August 2003, Lance-corporal Preben Pedersen, from the Jydske Dragonregiment (Jutland Dragoon Regiment), was killed by friendly fire.
- 1 October 2005, a Danish army reserve officer, from the Jydske Dragonregiment, First lieutenant Bjarke Olsen Kirkmand was killed by a roadside bomb.
- 23 March 2006, a Private from Den Kongelige Livgarde (the Royal Life Guards), Jesper Nielsen, was killed by an IED.
- 6 June 2006, a Pfc Dennis Ove Hansen, was killed in a vehicle accident.
- 23 September 2006, Lance-corporal from the Royal Danish Air Force, Kim Wadim, was killed by an IED.
- 6 October 2006, a Private from the Jydske Dragonregiment, Martin Hjorth was killed in combat following an ambush on a Danish patrol.
- 14 May 2007, Private Henrik Nøbbe from the Jydske Dragonregiment, was killed by small arms fire in an ambush in Al Harta.

== Awards and decorations ==
Every Danish soldier who participated in Dancon/Irak received The Defence Medal with an inscription reading OIF (the abbreviation for Operation Iraqi Freedom).

The Defence Medal for participation in Iraq has also been awarded posthumously to all the fallen soldiers.

Furthermore, in May 2005, two Danish soldiers received The Defence Medal for heroic deeds during their tour of duty in Iraq. They were both from Den Kongelige Livgarde. One of the two soldiers, Sergeant Ole Gretlund, was awarded the medal when he saved the lives of Lithuanian soldiers in Al-Qurnah. The Lithuanian soldiers, who were under the command of DANCON/Irak, were pinned down in a firefight with insurgents. Gretlund saved the lives of the soldiers by his exemplary leadership and personal valour. After some hours, the insurgents withdrew their positions and the Lithuanian soldiers were evacuated with no Danish or Lithuanian casualties.

Another Danish soldier, Pfc. Thomas Huusmann of the Danish Army Reserve, was awarded the medal because he saved the lives of both Iraqis and Danes in two firefights in Iraq. During the first, he saved the lives of an officer, an interpreter, and a sheikh while under heavy fire from local tribes in Al-Qurnah. In the second firefight in August 2004, Huusmann protected ten Danish soldiers' lives while under assault rifle and RPG fire from insurgents at close quarters, by remaining calm and returning fire. There were no casualties among any of the coalition soldiers on either occasion.

Each commander of Dancon/Irak has been awarded the Order of the Dannebrog for his service to the Danish Army.

Soldiers who served under Dancon/Irak that have been killed or wounded in action have also been awarded The Medal for Killed and Wounded in Service.

== See also ==
- Dancon
- Dancon March
