= GAFB =

GAFB may be:

- George Air Force Base, in Victorville, California
- Glasgow Air Force Base, in Glasgow, Montana
- Goodfellow Air Force Base, in San Angelo, Texas
- Griffiss Air Force Base, formerly in Rome, New York
- Grissom Air Force Base, in Bunker Hill, Indiana
- German Armed Forces Badge for Military Proficiency
- Google Apps for Business
