= German Armed Forces Badge for Military Proficiency =

German Armed Forces Badge for Military Proficiency Abzeichen für Leistungen im Truppendienst
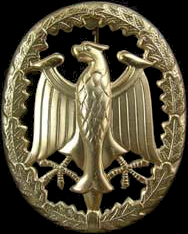
- Type: Military Badge
- Awarded for: Military Proficiency
- Description: Three classes: Gold, Silver and Bronze
- Country: Germany
- Presented by: the Federal Republic of Germany
- Eligibility: Service members of the German armed forces and allied nations
- Status: Currently awarded
- Established: October 29, 1980
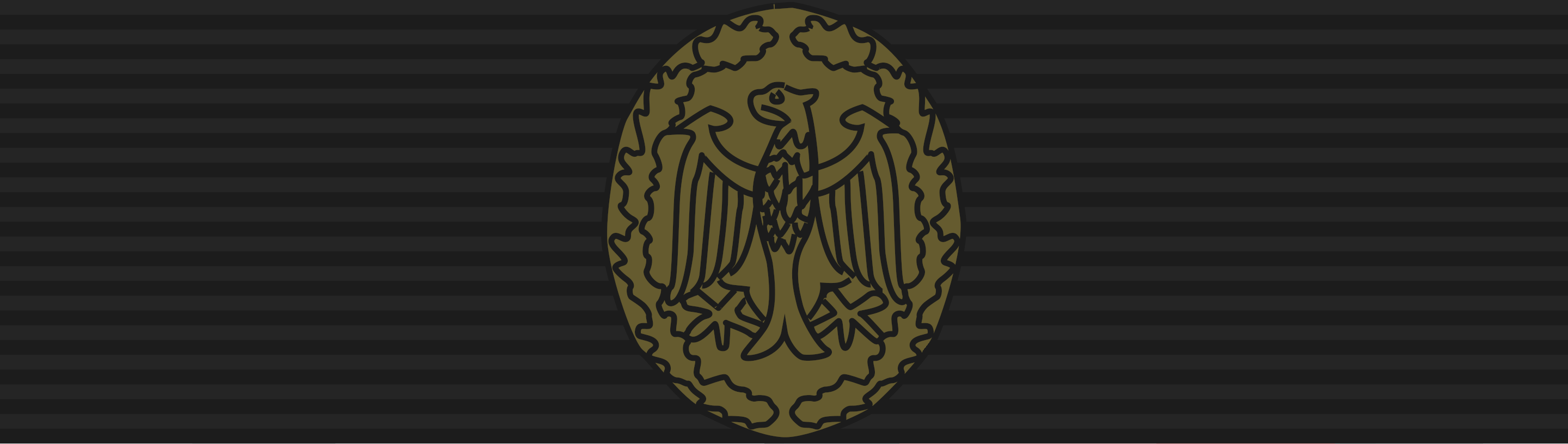
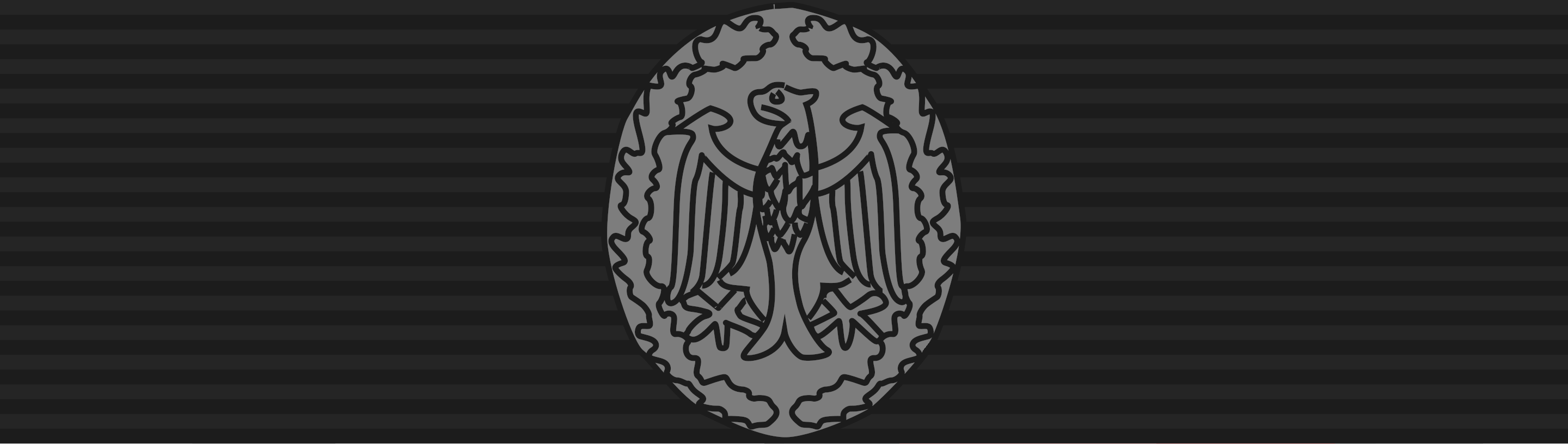
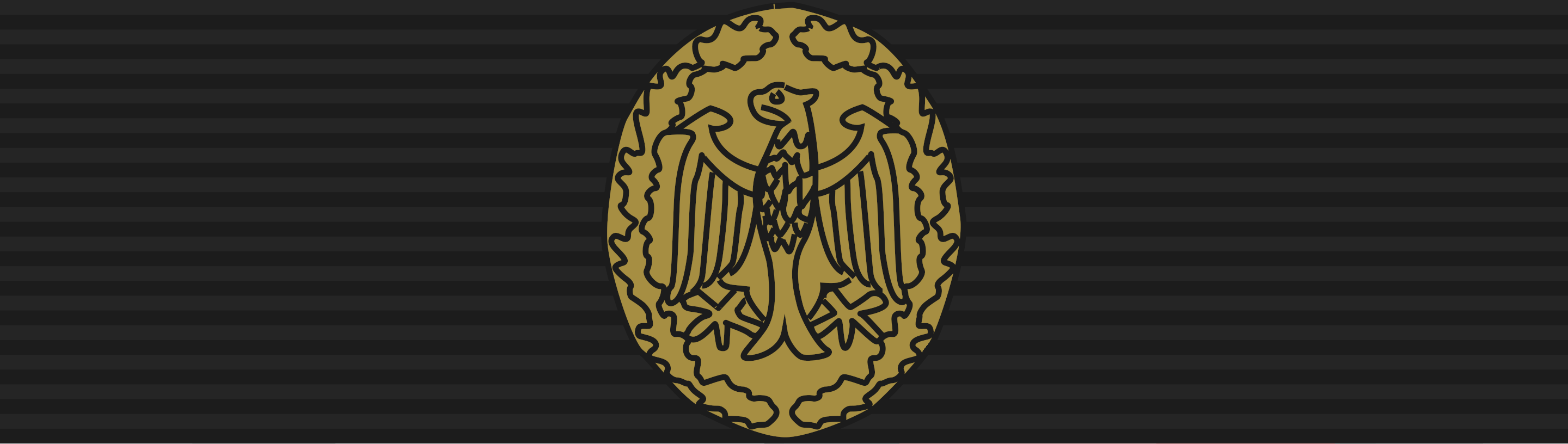
- Service ribbons with device "Leistungsabzeichen Bandschnalle"

The badge is worn centered on the left breast pocket (# 11).

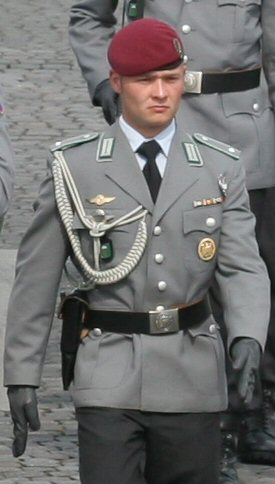
German airborne officer wearing the gold level badge centered on his left breast pocket as prescribed by Bundeswehr dress regulations.

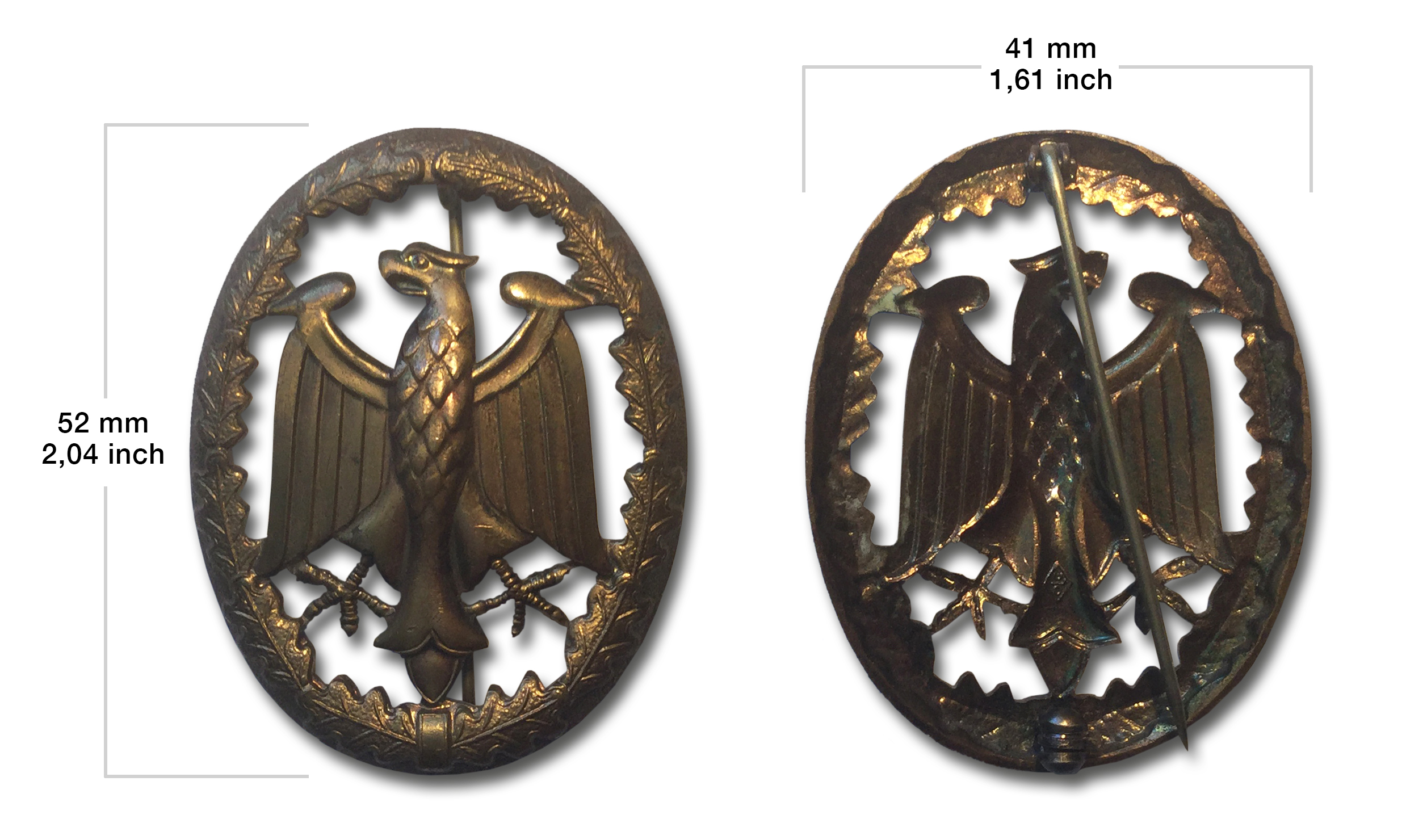
Front and Back of the badge in Bronze with size.

The German Armed Forces Badge for Military Proficiency (German: Das Abzeichen für Leistungen im Truppendienst) is a decoration of the Bundeswehr, the armed forces of the Federal Republic of Germany.

The decoration is awarded to and worn by German service members of all ranks. Allied service members may also be awarded the badge, subject to their nations' uniform regulations. In the United States Army, the German Armed Forces Badge for Military Proficiency is one of several hundred foreign awards approved for wear on the uniform.

== Requirements ==
To earn the award one must complete the following requirements:

1. Evaluation Report:

Evaluation report from Commanding Officer recognizing the individual’s physical and moral standards. The purpose of the evaluation is to show evidence that the individual is both physically and morally fit.

2. First Aid Course:

Combat Lifesaver Training (CLS) level 1 course or equivalent.

3. NBC Test:

Individual must demonstrate that they can properly don a protective mask and all NBC protective clothing.

4. Basic Fitness Test Three events completed within 90 minutes.

a. 11x10-meter sprint test, in maximum time of 60 seconds

| GOLD | SILVER | BRONZE |
|---|---|---|
| 35-42 sec. | 43-48 sec. | 49-54 sec |

b. Flexed Arm Hang keeping chin above bar, minimum time of five seconds.

| GOLD | SILVER | BRONZE |
|---|---|---|
| 86-65 sec. | 64-45 sec. | 44-25 sec |

c. 1000 meter run/sprint, maximum time of six minutes and thirty seconds

| GOLD | SILVER | BRONZE |
|---|---|---|
| 2:50-3:45 min. | 3:46-4:40 min. | 4:41-5:35 min. |

- The score for each event is determined using a grading point matrix. The scores are then averaged to determine what level badge the individual qualifies for.

5. Marksmanship: In order to qualify for the German Armed Forces Badge for Military Proficiency, it is necessary to demonstrate marksmanship skills. The individual must demonstrate their skill with one weapon qualification recognized in the Schützenschnur, any of the following are recognized: light (pistole or MP), rifle and heavy weapon (MG or AT-launcher). There are several shooting exercises in the German Armed Forces use for each weapon which vary distance, number of targets, position of firing (standing, prone, lying down) and number of shots. The individual must reach a specified score their respective qualification table.

6. Foot March

Foot March with 15kg (33lb) rucksack; no differences between gender and age.

| GOLD | SILVER | BRONZE |
|---|---|---|
| 12 km in 120 min | 9 km in 90 min | 6 km in 60 min |

- The march must be accomplished in military uniform (such as the ACU) and boots with a rucksack weighing no less than 15 kg.

7. 100 meter swim in Military Uniform

Swim is conducted in Military Uniform while wearing PT uniform (shorts and T-Shirt) underneath. There is a four-minute time limit for the swim. After swim is completed, time stops; however, the individual must also successfully remove their outer uniform without touching the side of the pool to pass.

== Grades ==
- Grade III = German Armed Forces Badge for Military Proficiency in Gold (Das Abzeichen für Leistungen im Truppendienst in Gold).
- Grade II = German Armed Forces Badge for Military Proficiency in Silver (Das Abzeichen für Leistungen im Truppendienst in Silber).
- Grade I = German Armed Forces Badge for Military Proficiency in Bronze (Das Abzeichen für Leistungen im Truppendienst in Bronze).

== Design ==
The metallic badge is an approximately 55mm high by 43mm wide oval wreath of oak leaves with the German eagle at its center. The badge can be in gold, silver or bronze. A 1cm by 1cm square bearing a number in increments of five (5, 10, 15...) is added at the bottom when the gold grade badge is awarded for multiple years of achieving this grade. A capital letter "R" is added at the bottom for those who have earned the badge while a Reservist. Reservist recipients of the gold grade for multiple years receive a badge with the "R" at the bottom and the numbered square at the top of the badge.

The ribbon is all black with a small device in the shape and colour of the badge affixed to it. The ribbon is for civilian wear only and is not permitted for wear on the uniform of the Bundeswehr.

== Practice ==
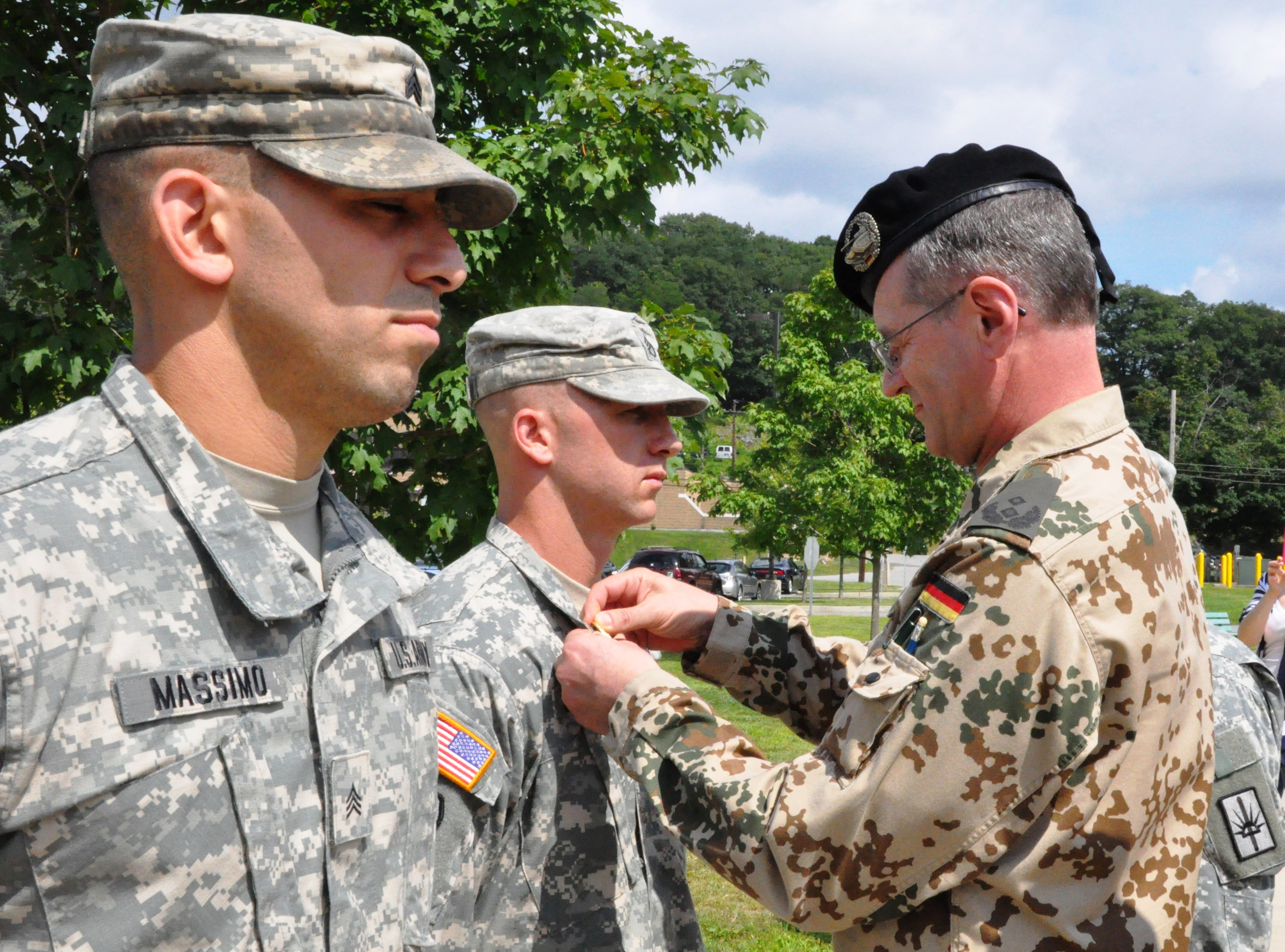
A US Army Staff Sergeant is awarded the Proficiency Badge by a Lieutenant Colonel of the German Army

U.S. Army Soldiers assigned to Task Force Seminole fire M4 carbines during a German Armed Forces Marksmanship Badge event at Chabelley Airfield, Djibouti in 2026.

The German army has opened the German Armed Forces Badge for Military Proficiency in Germany and overseas countries such as the US, South Korea, and other NATO countries.

== See also ==
- Awards and decorations of the German Armed Forces
- Dutch Military Proficiency Badge (Netherlands)
- Expert Infantryman Badge (United States)
- German Armed Forces Badge of Marksmanship
- Authorized foreign decorations of the United States military
- The Military Marching Badge (Norwegian Foot March)
