= International military decoration authorized by the United States military =

An international decoration is a military award which is not bestowed by a particular country, but rather by an international organization such as the United Nations or NATO. Such awards are normally issued as service medals, for participation in various international military operations, and not for specific acts of heroism or bravery. The first medal from an international organization accepted for wear by the United States Military was the United Nations Korea Medal in 1951. Subsequent acceptance of other United Nations Medals did not come until 1964 with Executive Order 11139. Acceptance of the medals of other international multilateral organizations finally came with Executive Order 11446 in 1969. Acceptance of these international decorations must be approved by not only the Secretary of Defense, but also the Secretary of State.

The following is a list of the most commonly recognized international military decorations that has been or is currently awarded to members of the United States military. Such awards are always worn after all United States decorations, but before all Foreign decorations.

== United Nations ==
The Assistant Secretary of Defense approved a change to the policy of the wear of United Nations Medals. Effective 13 October 1995, any US military personnel who is awarded a United Nations Medal may wear the ribbon of the first UN medal for which they qualify. Subsequent awards of the United Nations Medal for service in a different mission is noted by adding a bronze service star to the current ribbon. No more than one UN medal or ribbon may be worn at a time. Operations in which United States military personnel were awarded the United Nations Medal and authorized by the Department of Defense to accept and wear the medal are as follows:

United Nations Truce Supervision Organization (UNTSO) in Palestinian territories/United Nations Observation Group in Lebanon
United Nations Observer Group in India and Pakistan
United Nations Korea Medal
United Nations Temporary Executive Authority/UN Security Force in West New Guinea
United Nations Iraq–Kuwait Observation Mission
United Nations Mission for the Referendum in Western Sahara
United Nations Advance Mission in Cambodia
United Nations Protection Force in Yugoslavia
United Nations Transitional Authority in Cambodia
United Nations Operation in Somalia II
United Nations Operation in Mozambique
United Nations Observer Mission in Georgia
United Nations Mission in Haiti/United Nations Support Mission in Haiti
United Nations Preventive Deployment Force
United Nations Transitional Administration for Eastern Slavonia, Baranja and Western Sirmium
United Nations Verification Mission in Guatemala
United Nations Special Service Medal/United Nations Assistance Mission in Iraq
United Nations Interim Administration Mission in Kosovo
United Nations Mission in East Timor/United Nations Transitional Administration in East Timor/United Nations Mission of Support to East Timor
United Nations Mission in the Democratic Republic of Congo/United Nations Organization Stabilization Mission in the Democratic Republic of the Congo
United Nations Mission in Ethiopia and Eritrea
United Nations Mission in Liberia
United Nations Stabilisation Mission in Haiti
United Nations–African Union Mission in Darfur
United Nations Mission in the Central African Republic and Chad
United Nations Organization Stabilization Mission in the Democratic Republic of the Congo
United Nations Multidimensional Integrated Stabilization Mission in the Central African Republic
United Nations Multidimensional Integrated Stabilization Mission in Mali

== North Atlantic Treaty Organization ==
United States military personnel may accept and wear NATO medals authorized by the Secretary General of NATO and offered to the US Representative to NATO to recognize US service members who meet the eligibility criteria specified by NATO, so long as acceptance is approved by both the Secretary of Defense and the Secretary of State. NATO Medals may be awarded with a clasp that designates the operation for which the medal is awarded. United States military personnel may accept, but not wear the clasp. To date the following medals are the only NATO Medals authorized for acceptance and wear by US military personnel:

NATO Meritorious Service Medal
Yugoslavia service medal
Kosovo service
NATO Article 5 medal for Operation Eagle Assist
NATO Article 5 medal for Operation Active Endeavour
Non-article 5 medal for ISAF
NATO Non-Article 5 medal for the Balkans
Non-Article 5 medal for NATO Training Mission – Iraq
Non-Article 5 medal for Africa Operations Allied Provider, Allied Protector, and Ocean Shield
NATO Non-Article 5 medal for Operation Unified Protector
NATO Non-Article 5 medal for Operation Resolute Support

== Multinational Force and Observers ==
Multinational Force and Observers Medal

== Inter-American Defense Board ==
Inter-American Defense Board Medal

== SICOFAA ==
The System of Cooperation Among the American Air Forces awards the following decorations:

SICOFAA Legion of Merit Gentleman
SICOFAA Legion of Merit Officer
SICOFAA Legion of Merit Grand Cross

== CSDP ==
Common Security and Defence Policy

CSDP ALTHEA Operations medal ribbon bar
CSDP ALTHEA Staff medal ribbon bar
CSDP EUTM MALI Medal for Extraordinary Meritorious Service ribbon bar

== See also ==
Awards and decorations of the United States military
