= Dancon =

Dancon, an abbreviation of Danish Contingent, is the term that comprises all Danish national forces in a current military mission of the UN, NATO, or national character. Dancon is not a military unit per se, like a brigade, but rather an organisation in which all military units currently working in a mission are linked together. The commander of Dancon is usually the commander of the hierarchically biggest military unit associated with the specified mission, and does not have a headquarters of its own, but rather it is that military unit's headquarters.

Because several Dancons can exist at the same time, the mission name is usually added to Dancon, like Dancon/Irak or Dancon/SFOR.

- Dancon/UNFICYP (early 1964 – 1993)
- Dancon/UNPROFOR (April 1992 – October 1995)
- Dancon/IFOR (December 1995 – December 1996)
- Dancon/SFOR (December 1996 – August 2003)
- Dancon/Albanien (May 1997 – August 1997)
- Dancon/AFOR (June 1999 – September 1999)
- Dancon/KFOR (August 1999 – date)
- Dancon/UNMEE (November 2000 – July 2001)
- Dancon/ISAF (January 2002 – date)
- Dancon/SRO2 (March 2002 / Nato-excise Strong Resolve)
- Dancon/Irak (June 2003 – July 2007)
- Dancon/ISAF (February 2012 – August 2012)
- Dancon/USA (5 June 2021)

== See also ==
- Dancon March
