= Medal of Military Merit (Mexico) =

- emblem of the 1st class
- Native name: Medalla al Mérito Militar
- Awarded for: Military Merit
- Country: Mexico
- Established: 1897; 129 years ago
- First Class ribbon Second Class ribbon Third Class ribbon

Precedence
- Next (higher): War Cross
- Next (lower): Medal of Naval Merit

The Medal of Military Merit is a decoration of Mexico, awarded by the President of the Republic following the recommendation of the Secretary of National Defence.

== History ==
The Medal was created in 1897, with six classes, three for officers and three for other ranks. In 1926, it was suppressed and replaced by the medal of heroic valour. In 1929, the Military Merit medal was re-established to reward distinguished deeds of members of the Mexican Armed Forces, or exceptional deeds for their benefit carried out by foreigners.

From 1929, the award has possessed only three regular classes. Physically, it consists of a blue cross with a superimposed golden star, containing in the centre the Mexican coat of arms in gold on a blue background, surrounded by a red border inscribed in gold "Military Merit" and the class of the medal. The second and third classes are smaller, being suspended from a blue ribbon (with a narrow central red stripe in the case of the second class and two narrow red stripes in the case of the third). along with the 1st class is a special grade dubbed 'the Order Grade'.

In 1901, the state of Yucatán, with authorization from the Federal Government, awarded the Medal of Military Merit to more than 8,000 soldiers of the army and the National Guard who participated in the battles against the Maya.

In 1915, General Álvaro Obregón was decorated with a medal of military merit for his heroic participation in the battles of the Bajío.

In 1980, future Cuban President Raúl Castro was decorated with the medal. In 2020, the medal was awarded to soldiers who had distinguished themselves during the response to the COVID-19 pandemic.

== Appearance ==
The Order Grade is worn as a sash and star, with the star being 65mm X 65mm. the sash is of white rayon and is 70mm wide, with a central 30mm band with two blue and one gold stripes, each 10mm wide, at the end of the sash is a knot and a gold fringe. Written in the central enamel circle is the legend "MÉRITO MILITAR" and "1A. CLASE".

The First Class is worn suspended from a golden cord 67cm long and 5mm thick, the pendant is 45mm X 45mm. Written in the central enamel circle is the legend "MÉRITO MILITAR" and "1A. CLASE".

The Second Class is worn from a blue ribbon 40mm by 30mm wide, with a red centre stripe suspended from a golden clasp. the pendant is identical to the first class medal, with the exception of the superimposed star, which is in silver rather than gold. Written in the central enamel circle is the legend "MÉRITO MILITAR" and "2A. CLASE".

The Third Class is worn from a blue and red ribbon with five stripes, three blue and two red, suspended from a silver clasp. The Pendant is otherwise identical to the 2nd class. Written in the central enamel circle is the legend "MÉRITO MILITAR" and "3A. CLASE".
