= Dutch Military Proficiency Badge =

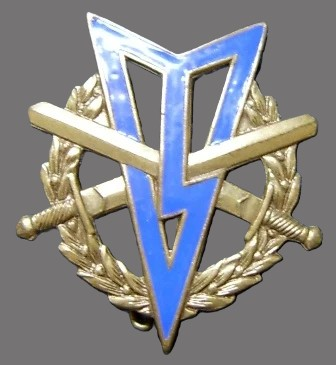
- Type: Badge
- Awarded for: Military proficiency
- Description: Awarded in a basic version and an additional version for completion of the aquatic option
- Presented by: Royal Netherlands Army
- Eligibility: Military servicemembers
- Status: Currently awarded

The Dutch Military Proficiency Badge (Dutch: Militaire Lichamelijke Vaardigheid or MLV) is a military badge offered by the Royal Netherlands Army.

== Requirements ==
- 1000 m sprint (To be completed with helmet and rifle)
- 5000 m run
- Hand grenade throwing
- Rope climbing
- Cat crawling
- Obstacle Course

Completion of these requirements qualifies a candidate for the plain bronze badge.

=== Aquatic option ===
In addition to the requirements for the badge, an aquatic option is available for the Dutch Military Proficiency Badge. Completion of the aquatic option is indicated with a blue enamel field on the badge.

The requirements for the swimming option are:

- 200 meters swim
- 15 meters underwater swim on one breath
- Swimming with a rifle
- 10 meters rescue pulling stroke

== See also ==
- German Armed Forces Badge for Military Proficiency
- European Police Achievement Badge
