= Air Force Cross of Aeronautical Merit =

Columbian order

Aerospace Force Cross of Aeronautical Merit Cruz de la Fuerza Aérea al "Mérito Aeronáutico"
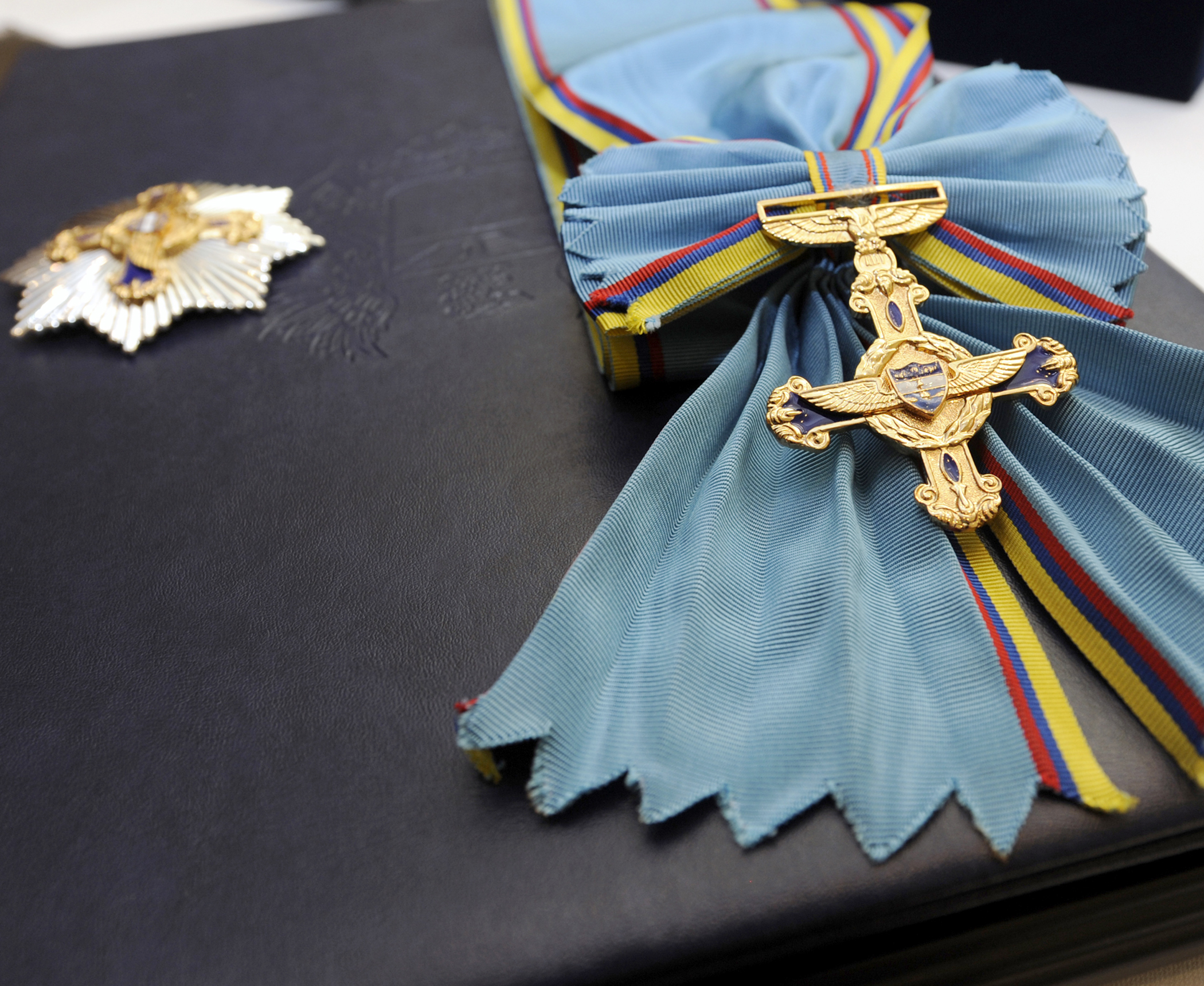
- Aerospace Force Cross of Aeronautical Merit Grand Cross sash and star.

Awarded by Colombia
- Established: 20 March 1948
- Awarded for: Exceptional military service to Colombia
- Status: Currently constituted
- Grand Master: President of Colombia
- Grand Chancellor: Minister of National Defence
- Grades: Grand Cross, Grand Officer, Commander, Officer, Knight, Companion

Precedence
- Next (higher): Orden del Mérito Naval "Almirante Padilla"
- Next (lower): Orden del Mérito Sanitario “José Fernández Madrid”

The Aerospace Force Cross of Aeronautical Merit (Spanish: Cruz de la Fuerza Aeroespacial al "Mérito Aeronáutico") is an order granted by Colombia, established in 1948. The order is awarded for distinguished service to the Colombian Aerospace Force.

== History ==
Established by Decree 1068 of 20 March 1948, the Aerospace Force Cross of Aeronautical Merit was originally known as the Order of Aeronautical Merit Antonio Ricaurte.

== Criteria ==
The Aerospace Force Cross of Aeronautical Merit is primarily awarded to Colombian Aerospace Force personnel, but may be awarded to members of the Colombian Armed Forces or Colombian National Police. It may also be awarded to foreign civilian and military personnel. Individuals are recognized for valor and military virtue, as well as distinguished and notable service to the Colombian Aerospace Force.

== Grades ==
The Aerospace Force Cross of Aeronautical Merit is awarded in the following grades:

- Grand Cross (Gran Cruz)
- Grand Officer (Gran Oficial)
- Commander (Comendador)
- Officer (Oficial)
- Knight (Caballero)
- Companion (Compañero)

Ribbon bars of the Aerospace Force Cross of Aeronautical Merit
Grand Cross	Grand Officer	Commander
Officer	Knight	Companion
