= Order of Health Merit Jose Fernandez Madrid =

Order of Health Merit Jose Fernandez Madrid Orden del Mérito Sanitario "José Fernández Madrid"

Awarded by Colombia
- Established: 22 July 1950
- Awarded for: Exceptional service to Colombia
- Status: Currently constituted
- Grand Master: President of Colombia
- Grand Chancellor: Minister of National Defence
- Grades: Grand Cross, Grand Officer, Commander, Officer, Knight, Companion

Precedence
- Next (higher): Cruz de la Fuerza Aérea al "Mérito Aeronáutico"
- Next (lower): Orden "Estrella de la Policía"

The Order of Health Merit Jose Fernandez Madrid (Spanish: Orden del Mérito Sanitario "José Fernández Madrid") is an order granted by Colombia, established in 1950. The order is awarded for distinguished service in the medical field to the Colombian Armed Forces.

== Criteria ==
The Order of Health Merit Jose Fernandez Madrid is primarily awarded to members of the Colombian Military Medical Corps for acts of heroism, excellence in military spirit and discipline, performance in instruction in the development of the tasks of the General Staff, scientific research for the benefit of the Colombian Armed Forces and distinguished service. Members of the other branches of the armed forces may be awarded this order, as well as foreign civilian and military personnel.

== Grades ==
The Order of Health Merit Jose Fernandez Madrid is awarded in the following grades:

- Grand Cross (Gran Cruz)
- Grand Officer (Gran Oficial)
- Commander (Comendador)
- Officer (Oficial)
- Knight (Caballero)
- Companion (Compañero)

Ribbon bars of the Order of Health Merit Jose Fernandez Madrid
| Grand Cross | Grand Officer | Commander |
| Officer | Knight | Companion |

== Notable recipients ==
- C. Walton Lillehei
