= Dancon March =

Danish military march

Ribbon of medal

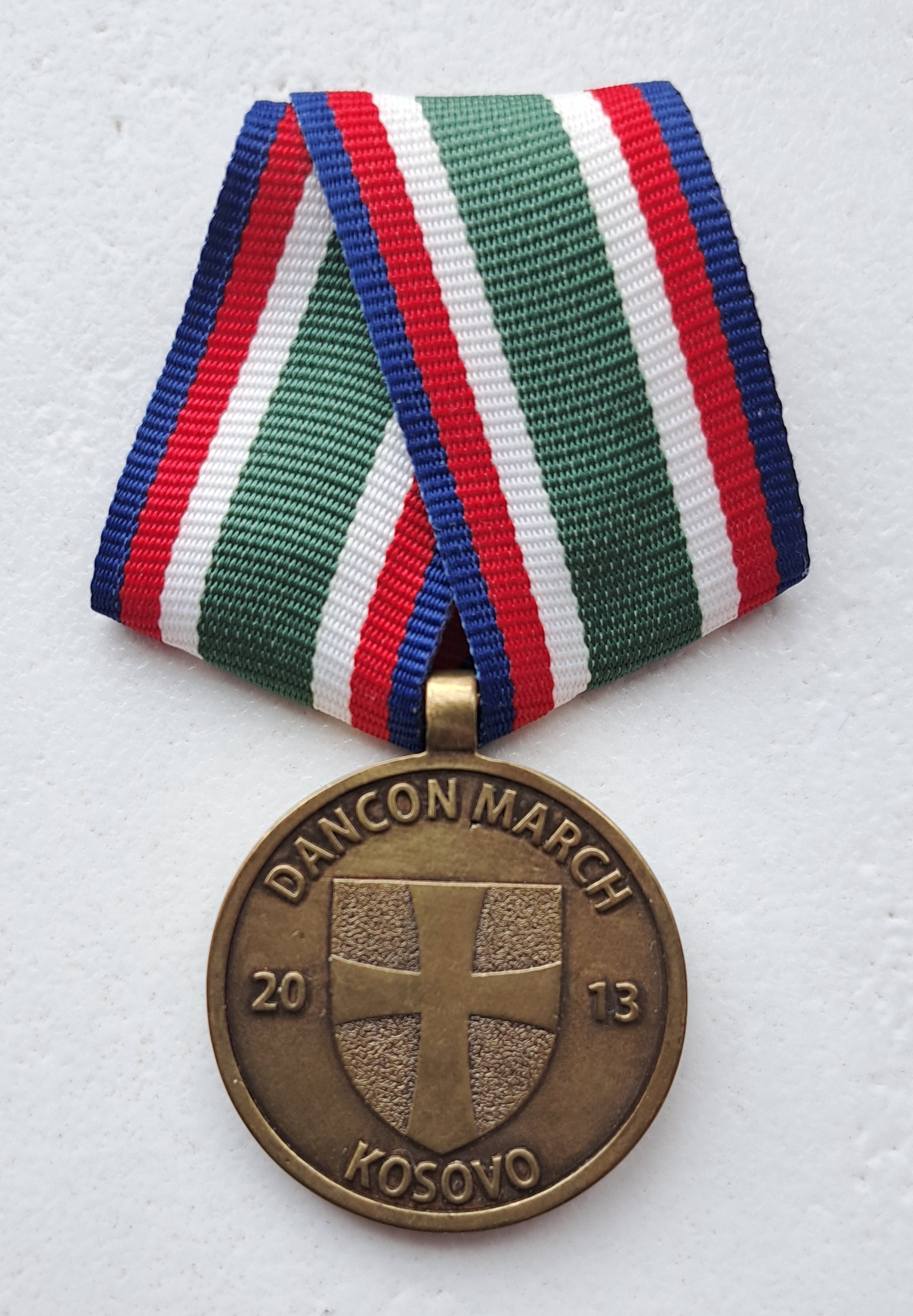
Avers of the DANCON MARCH Medal of 2013

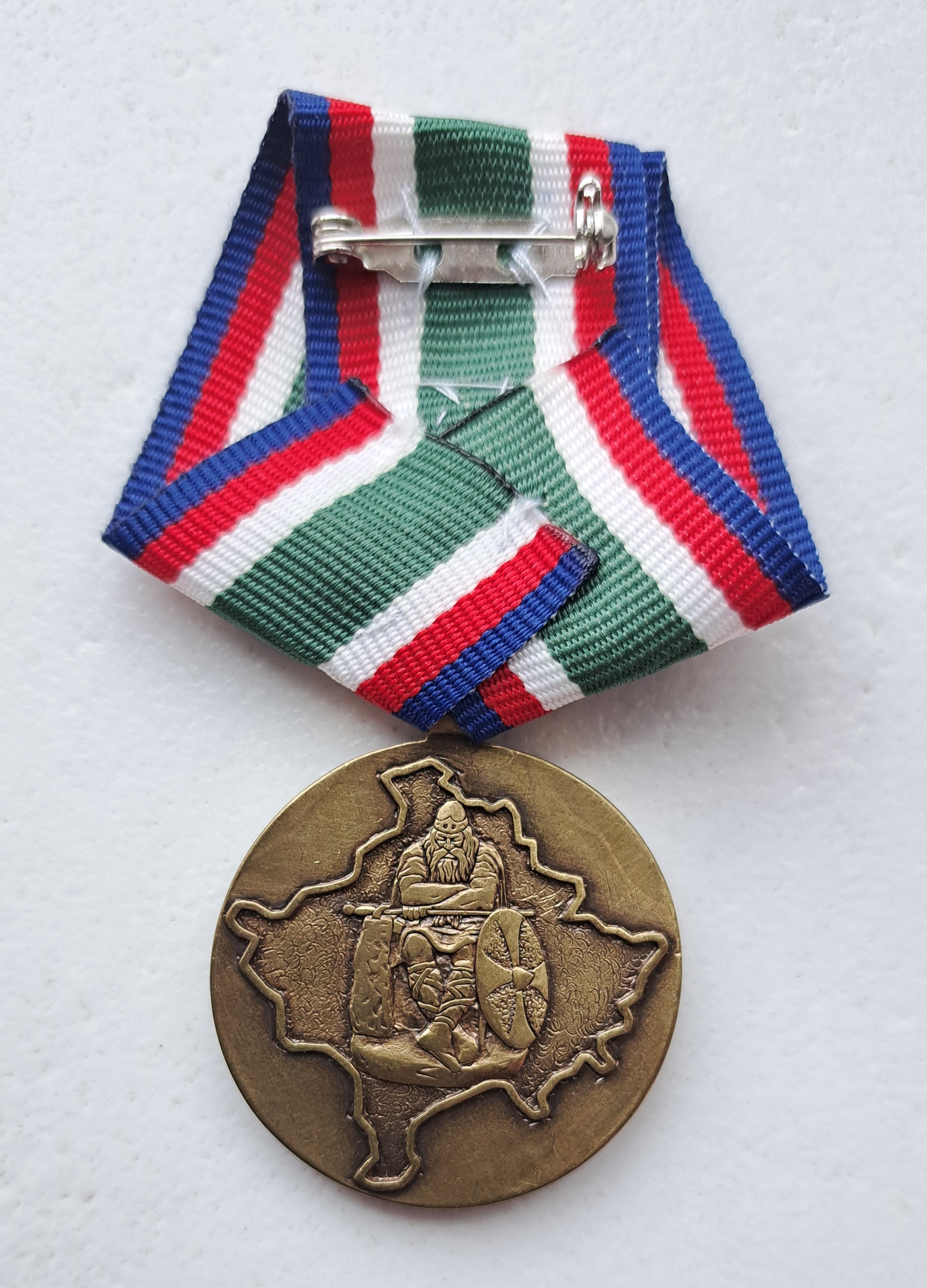
Revers of the DANCON MARCH Medal of 2013

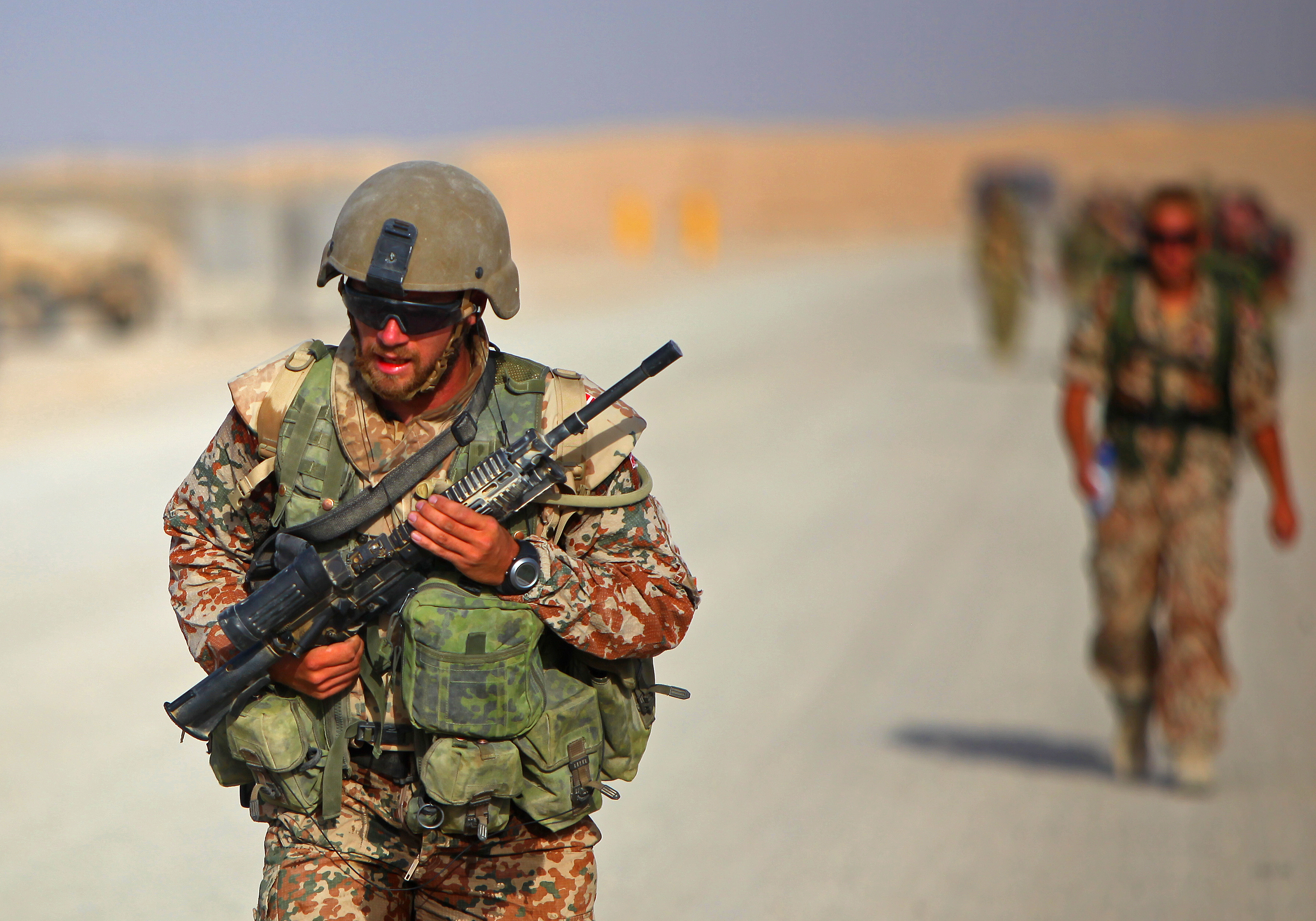
A Danish soldier during the Dancon March in Camp Leatherneck, Helmand Province, 2011.

The Dancon March is a military march performed by the DANCON (short for Danish Contingent) during missions abroad. The march has been a tradition with the Danish Defence since 1972 when the Royal Danish Army was deployed on Cyprus. The march invites foreign troops, allied with Denmark, to participate in the 25 or 40 km march. Apart from Cyprus, Dancon marches have taken place in Mongolia, Croatia, Kosovo, Iraq, Afghanistan, Lebanon, Eritrea, Kuwait, Bosnia, Mali and the Gulf of Aden, United Arab Emirates, United States, Latvia, Estonia, Republic of Korea and United Kingdom.

In 2024 the DANCON March took place on 15 June in Pituffik Space Base in Northern Greenland, the world's northernmost DANCON March ever held. The march was arranged by The Danish Liaison Officer, LtCol Lars Hawaleschka Madsen from Joint Arctic Command with Support from US 821 Space Base Group.

== Quotes ==
- "The purpose of the march is to demonstrate the physical preparedness of the army and as a social event." - Danish Staff Sgt. Morten Reher

== Ribbons of the DANCON March ==
| Ribbon | English description | Danish description |
Military marching insignia of the Danish Contingent (DANCON)
| | Ribbon of the Dancon March - DANCON UNFICYP (Cyprus 1964-1993) | Dancon March medaljen |
| | Ribbon of the Dancon March - DANCON UNTAG (Namibia) | Dancon March medaljen |
| | Ribbon of the Dancon March - DANCON UNIKOM (Kuwait, Iraq) | Dancon March medaljen |
| | Ribbon of the Dancon March - DANCON UNPROFOR (Croatia 1992-1995) | Dancon March medaljen |
| | Ribbon of the Dancon March - DANCON UNPF | Dancon March medaljen |
| | Ribbon of the Dancon March - IFOR (Bosnia 1995-1996) | Dancon March medaljen |
| | Ribbon of the Dancon March - IFOR National Support Element IFOR (Bosnia) | Dancon March medaljen |
| | Ribbon of the Dancon March - IFOR DANCON SFOR (Bosnia 1996-2003) | Dancon March medaljen |
| | Ribbon of the Dancon March - IFOR DANCON SFOR (Bosnia) | Dancon March medaljen |
| | Ribbon of the Dancon March - IFOR DANSQN Tuzla (Bosnia 1994) | Dancon March medaljen |
| | Ribbon of the Dancon March - IFOR DANCON UNOMIG (Georgia) | Dancon March medaljen |
| | Ribbon of the Dancon March - IFOR DANCON UNGC (Iraq; Kurdistan 1994) | Dancon March medaljen |
| | Ribbon of the Dancon March - IFOR DANCON UNPREDEP (Macedonia) – typ 1. | Dancon March medaljen |
| | Ribbon of the Dancon March - DANCON UNPREDEP (Macedonia) – typ 2. | Dancon March medaljen |
| | Ribbon of the Dancon March - DANCON UNMEE (Ethiopia and Eritrea) | Dancon March medaljen |
| | Ribbon of the Dancon March - DANCON UNMEE (Ethiopia and Eritrea) | Dancon March medaljen |
| | Ribbon of the Dancon March - DANCON UNMEE (Ethiopia and Eritrea) | Dancon March medaljen |
| | Ribbon of the Dancon March - DANCON KFOR (Kosovo) | Dancon March medaljen |
| | Ribbon of the Dancon March - DANCON National Support Element KFOR (Kosovo) | Dancon March medaljen |
| | Ribbon of the Dancon March - DANCON KFOR (Kosovo) | Dancon March medaljen |
| | Ribbon of the Dancon March - DANCON Task Force FOX (Macedonia) | Dancon March medaljen |
| | Ribbon of the Dancon March - DANCON AFOR (Albania 1999) | Dancon March medaljen |
| | Ribbon of the Dancon March - DANDET Kyrgyzstan | Dancon March medaljen |
| | Ribbon of the Dancon March - DANCON ISAF (Afghanistan od 2002) | Dancon March medaljen |
| | Ribbon of the Dancon March - Iraq (2003–2007) | Dancon March medaljen |
| | Ribbon of the Dancon March - DANCON KFOR (Kosovo 2010) | Dancon March medaljen |
| | Ribbon of the Dancon March - DANCON KFOR (Kosovo 2012-2014) | Dancon March medaljen |
| | Ribbon of the Dancon March - DANCON KFOR (Kosovo 2015) | Dancon March medaljen |
| | Ribbon of the Dancon March - DANCON KFOR (Kosovo 2016) | Dancon March medaljen |
| | Ribbon of the Dancon March - DANCON KFOR (Kosovo 2017) | Dancon March medaljen |
| | Ribbon of the Dancon March - DANCON KFOR (Kosovo 2018-2022) | Dancon March medaljen |
| | Ribbon of the Dancon March - DANCON KFOR (Kosovo 2023) | Dancon March medaljen |
| | Ribbon of the Dancon March - DANCON KFOR (Kosovo 2025) | Dancon March medaljen |
| | Ribbon of the Dancon March - DANCON Camp Novo Selo (Kosovo) | Dancon March medaljen |
| | Ribbon of the Dancon March - DANCON Camp Novo Selo (Kosovo 2023) | Dancon March medaljen |
| | Ribbon of the Dancon March - DANCON Camp Novo Selo (Kosovo 2023); 75th March | Dancon March medaljen |
| | Ribbon of the Dancon March - DANCON Camp Novo Selo (Kosovo 2025) | Dancon March medaljen |
| in preparation | Ribbon of the Dancon March - DANCON SRO2 (Strong Resolve Operation) | Dancon March medaljen |
| | Ribbon of the Dancon March - DANCON UNIFIL (Liban) | Dancon March medaljen |
| | Ribbon of the Dancon March - DANCON Chaghcharan (Afghanistan) | Dancon March medaljen |
| in preparation | Ribbon of the Dancon March - DANCON Feyzabad (Afghanistan) | Dancon March medaljen |
| | Ribbon of the Dancon March - DANCON Helmand (Afghanistan) | Dancon March medaljen |
| | Ribbon of the Dancon March - DANCON Kabul (Afghanistan) | Dancon March medaljen |
| | Ribbon of the Dancon March - DANCON Mazar-e-Sharif (Afghanistan) | Dancon March medaljen |
| | Ribbon of the Dancon March - DANCON Resolute Support (Afghanistan 2020) | Dancon March medaljen |
| | Ribbon of the Dancon March - DANCON Bahrain (2014) | Dancon March medaljen |
| | Ribbon of the Dancon March - DANCON Iraq (NATO Mission Iraq) | Dancon March medaljen |
| | Ribbon of the Dancon March - DANCON Kuwait | Dancon March medaljen |
| in preparation | Ribbon of the Dancon March - DANCON MINUSMA (Mali) | Dancon March medaljen |
| in preparation | Ribbon of the Dancon March - DANCON South Sudan | Dancon March medaljen |
| | Ribbon of the Dancon March - DANCON MNCNE Szczecin (2016) | Dancon March medaljen |
| | Ribbon of the Dancon March - DANCON MNCNE Szczecin (2019) | Dancon March medaljen |
| | Ribbon of the Dancon March - DANCON Estonia (2022) | Dancon March medaljen |
| | Ribbon of the Dancon March - DANCON Latvia (2022) | Dancon March medaljen |
