= Military Marching Badge =

The Military Marching Badge (Marsjmerket)
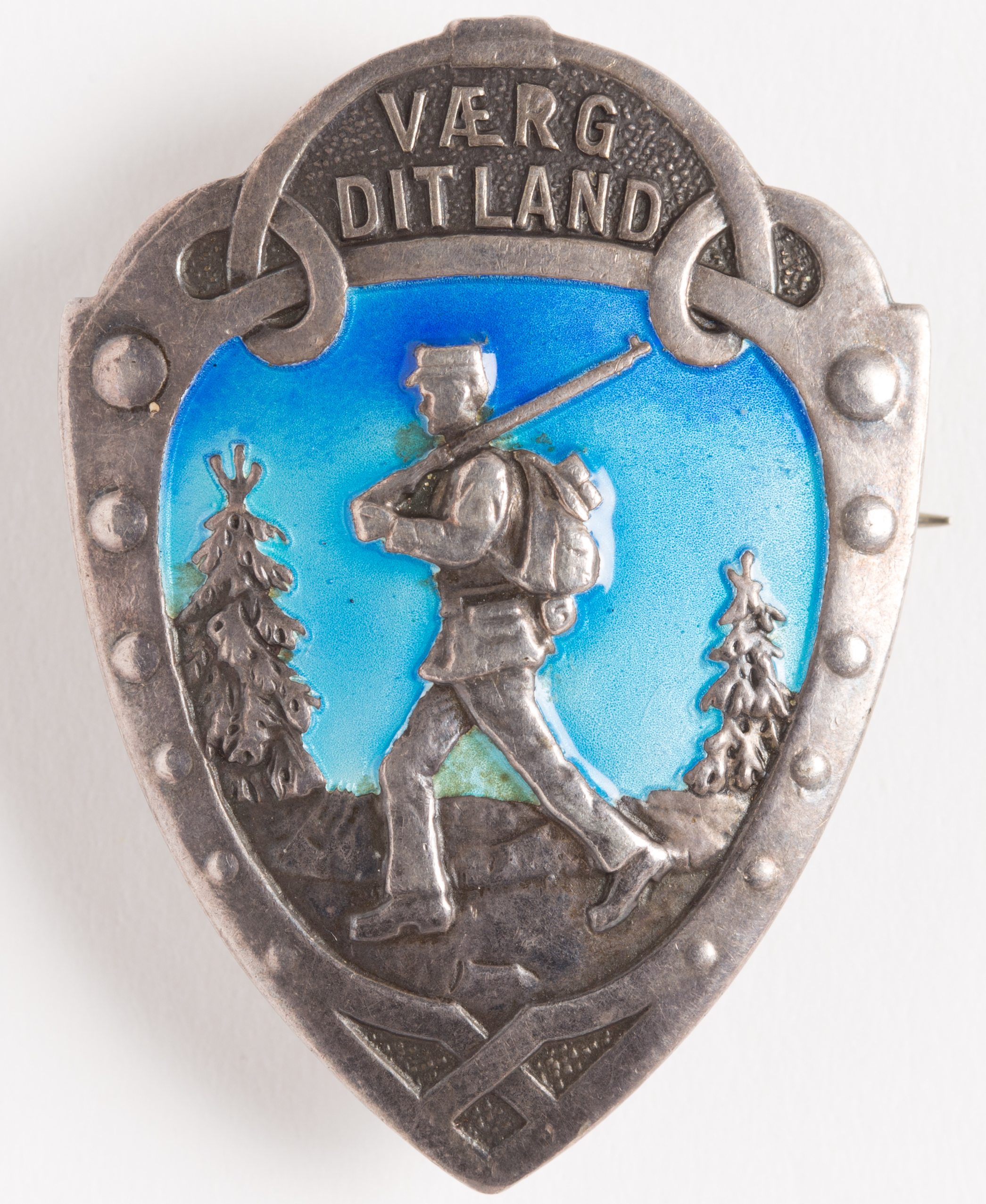
- "Protect your country" 1915–1937 (In Norwegian: Værg dit land)
- Type: Skill Badge
- Awarded for: Completion of 30 kilometer loaded ruck march
- Presented by: Norwegian Armed Forces or Liaison
- Eligibility: All personnel
- Established: 1915
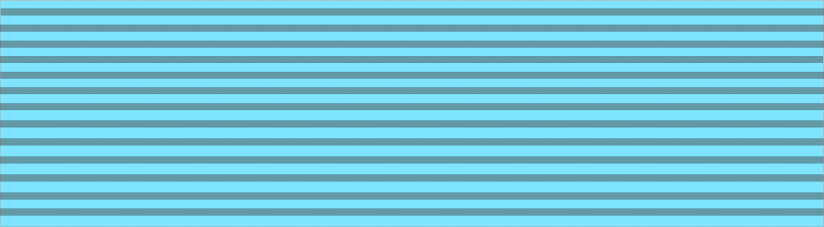
- Service ribbon for gold version

The Military Marching Badge (Marsjmerket), usually called the Norwegian Foot March Badge or simply the NFM by US Service Members, is a Proficiency Badge of the Norwegian Armed Forces. It was instituted in 1915, popularly called the tremila in Norway, and is awarded to those who meet defined requirements for a 30-kilometer loaded march. The badge's purpose is to stimulate interest in marching among military and civilian personnel.

The marching badge was previously an annual strength test at the Norwegian Military Academy in Oslo, and part of the basic soldier's education for Norwegian Conscripts. As of 2018, it has been voluntary. The Military Marching Badge is no longer authorized for wear on uniforms of the Norwegian Armed Forces, and has since been replaced by the Norwegian Armed Forces Medal for Military Sports, with differing criteria.

== Requirements ==
The badge is awarded for meeting the requirements.The test is a 30 km (18.64-mile) march (march/run) with a rucksack weighing 11 kg (24.25 lbs). The rucksack must weigh at least 11 kg at both start and finish line. The march must be completed within a maximum time, which varies between classes and genders.

AGE	FEMALE	MALE
18–20	5:25	4:35
20–34	5:15	4:30
35–42	5:25	4:35

Rucksack of approved military model must be used. Weapons can be included as weight in the package, but there is no longer a requirement to carry a rifle. Civilian participants may use a different type of backpack.

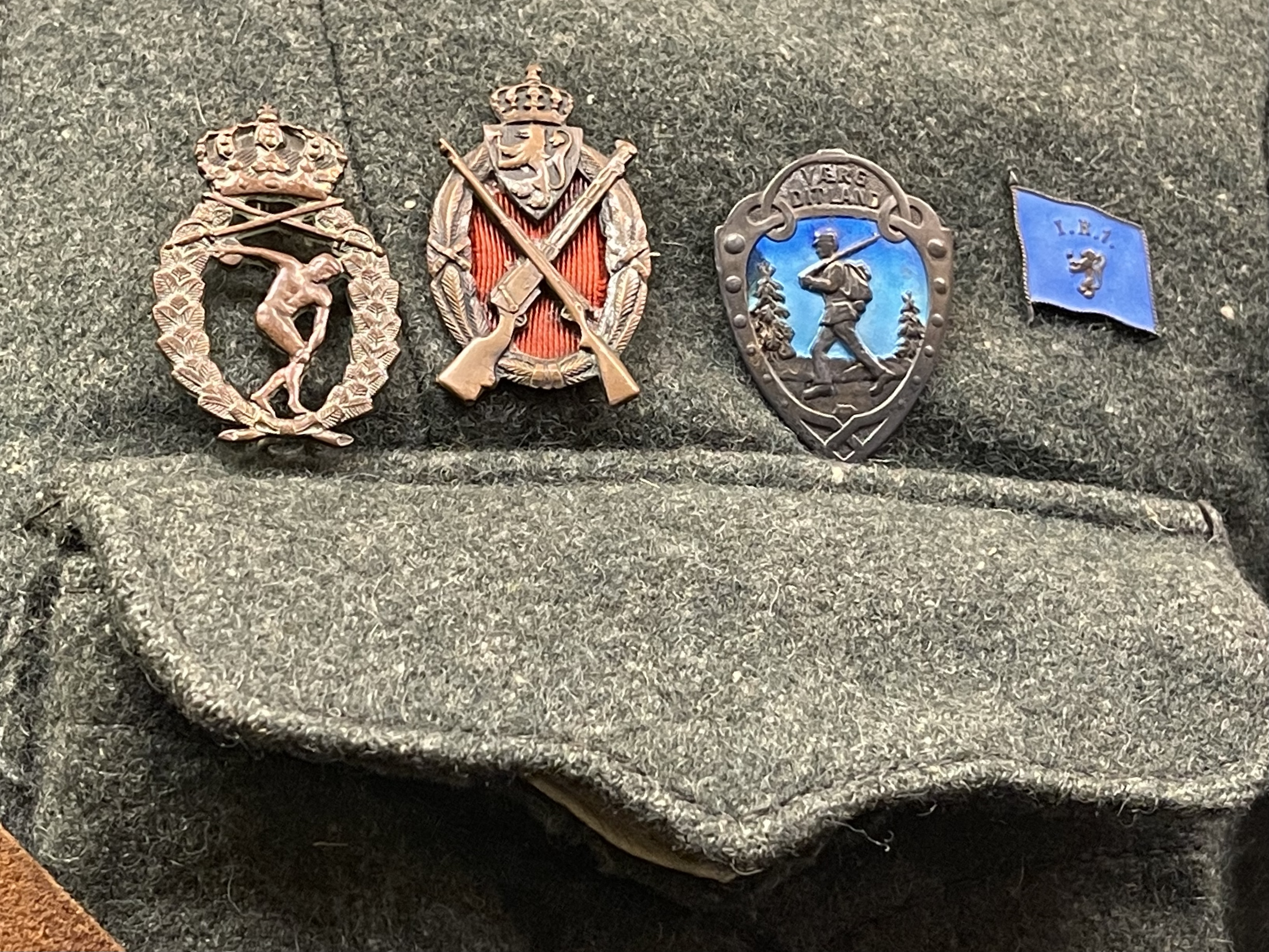
Norwegian Army Badges used during World War II, from Home Front Museum in Rakkestad.

Individuals may only complete one Ruck March per Calendar year.

=== Award Criteria Breakdown ===
The Norwegian Foot March (Marsjmerket) awards bronze, silver, or gold badges based on completing an 18.6-mile (30km) ruck with a 25lbs (11kg) pack in under 4.5 hours (varies by age/gender):

- Bronze is awarded for the 1st completion,
- Silver for the 2nd–4th, and
- Gold for the 5th completion

=== Debate ===
In 2014, the Norwegian Armed Forces proposed to reduce the distance to 20 km, citing the generally poor physical condition of Norwegian soldiers and fears of strain injuries. This created considerable debate and opposition from many quarters within the Armed Forces. In 2014, it was decided to keep the original distance. At the same time, the requirements were relaxed somewhat. It was allowed to wear sneakers, and to carry out the exercise without weapons as long as the pack on the back still weighed eleven kilograms.

== Outside Norway ==
Interest in carrying out the march among non-Norwegian units has increased sharply since the end of 2020, partially because the Norwegian Armed Forces moved away from the requirement for a Norwegian representative. According to the US military, over 10,000 soldiers marched between New Year 2020 and July 2021.

=== In the US military ===
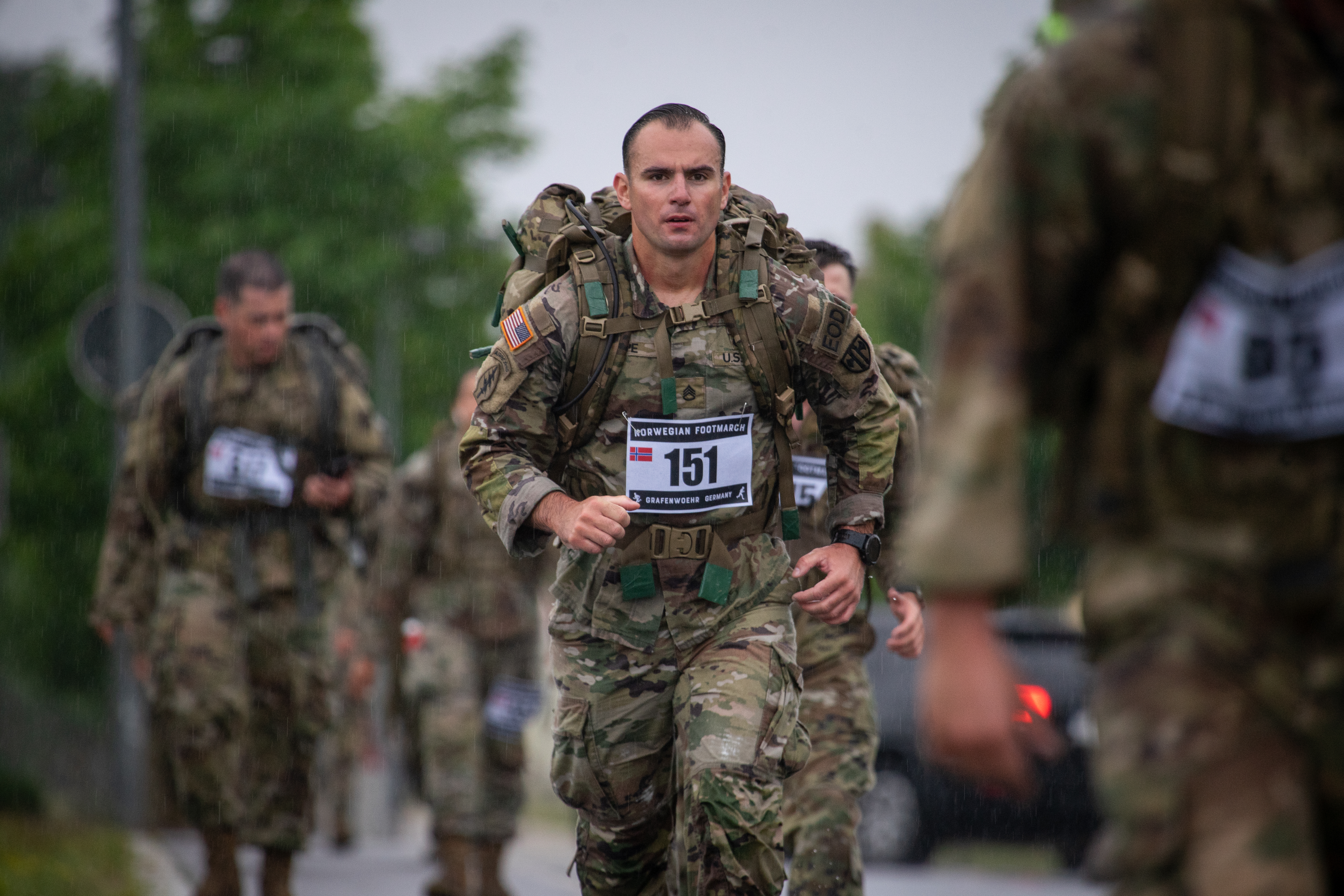
The 18th Combat Sustainment Support Battalion hosted a Norwegian Foot March in Grafenwoehr, Germany.

The NFM Badge is among a number of Authorized foreign decorations of the United States military which are military decorations which have been approved for wear by members of the United States armed forces but whose awarding authority is the government of a country other than the United States.

During 2022, 14,800 American soldiers attempted the NFM Badge.

Since March 21, 2025, the larger 1.5" inch version of the NFM Badge has been authorized for wear by the United States Army according to Army Regulation 600-8-22. In the past, only the 0.875" inch and 0.75" inch versions of the badge were worn by the US Military, and it's uncommon for AR 600-8-22 to add physical characteristics and guidelines on the outside of badge besides grade or coloring. Typically the badge has been 0.75" inch in size, however, the US Army authorizes up to 1.5" inch versions.

== See also ==
- Authorized foreign decorations of the United States military
- Orders, decorations, and medals of Norway
