= German snorkeling badge =

Award for proficiency in snorkeling

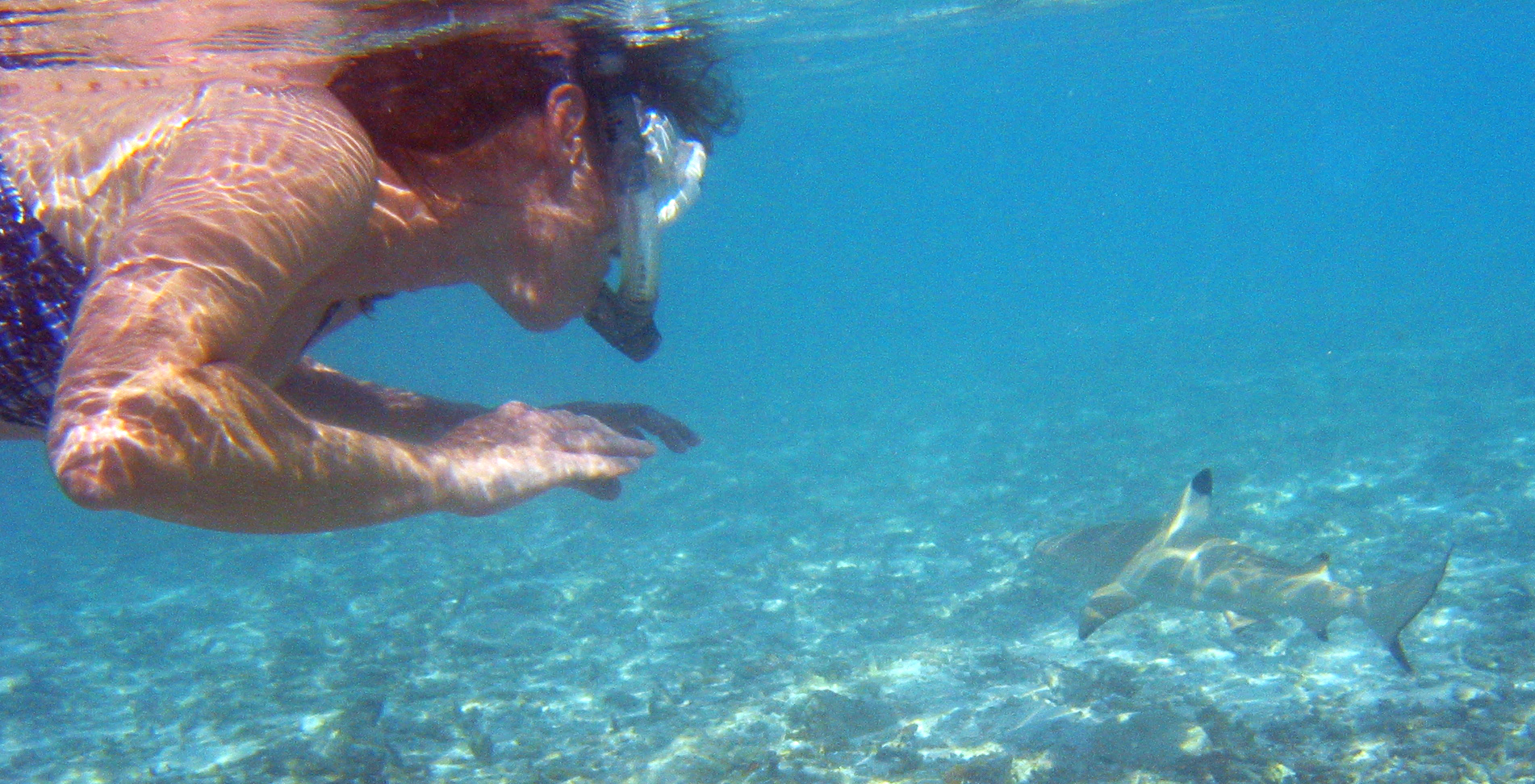
A snorkeler observes a blacktip reef shark

The German snorkeling badge is a badge awarded for proficiency in snorkeling. It functions as a preparation for scuba diving certification courses.

The badge is awarded either by the DLRG or the Wasserwacht of the German Red Cross.

== Requirements ==
Requirements by the DLRG:

=== Prerequisites ===
- At least 12 years old
- Medical fitness for diving
- Completion of rescue swimming badge in bronze

=== Written test ===
- Written exam
- Proficiency in hand gestures

=== Swim test ===
- 600 meter swim with fins (3 different strokes)
- 200 meter swim with one fin
- 30 meter underwater swim on one breath
- Holding breath under water for 30 seconds
- Taking off mask, putting mask back on under water
- Diving to depth of three meters three times in one minute
- Combination of:
  - 50 meter swim with fins, diving to 3-5 meter depth and retrieving a 5 kg ring
  - Pulling a partner for 50 meters
  - 3 minutes of demonstrating CPR

== See also ==
- List of German Sports Badges
- German rescue swimming badge
