= List of German Sports Badges =

This is a list of Sports Badges awarded by the Federal Republic of Germany

== State decorations ==
- Silver Laurel Leaf (Silbernes Lorbeerblatt)

== Awards of the German Olympic Sports Association ==
- German Sports Badge (Deutsches Sportabzeichen)
- German Sports Badge for juveniles

== Awards by the German Athletics Organization ==
- German track and field badge
- Running Badge
- Power walking badge

== Awards by type of sport ==
=== Swimming ===
- German swimming badge
- German rescue swimming badge
- German snorkeling badge

== Military awards ==
- German Armed Forces Badge for Military Proficiency

== Obsolete awards ==
Public wear of all Nazi Party awards, including sports badges, was banned after 1945.

- SA Sports Badge (SA-Sportabzeichen)
- Hitler Youth Leader's Gold Sports Badge (Goldenes Fuhrersportabzeichen der Hitler Jugend)
- Hitler Youth Proficiency Badge (Leistungsabzeichen der Hitler Jugend)
- Sports Badge of the GDR (Sportleistungsabzeichen der DDR)
