= Idrottsmärke =

Swedish physical fitness award

Riksidrottsförbundets idrottsmärke
- Type: Badge
- Awarded for: physical fitness
- Description: Awarded in three classes: gold, silver and bronze
- Eligibility: Civilians
- Established: 1907

The Riksidrottsförbundets idrottsmärke, or short: Idrottsmärke, was a Swedish sports badge that was created as a national decoration for physical fitness in 1907.

== History ==
Emil Lövenius, member of the Riksidrottsförbundets, the national sports governing body in Sweden, founded the Riksidrottsförbundets idrottsmärke in 1907. It was created to test the physical fitness of regular Swedish citizens in different disciplines and thus act as an incentive to improve the general health of the nation. It was awarded in three classes:

- Bronze was awarded for the first three repetitions.
- Silver was awarded from the 4th until the 7th repetition.
- Gold was awarded from the 8th repetition onwards or if the requirements were fulfilled with an age of 32 years and above.

At first, only male adults could achieve the Idrottsmärke. Women were allowed to take the tests for the first time in 1916; male youth in 1919 und female youth in 1923.

Carl Diem, an official of the German national sports governing body, encountered the Idrottsmärke during the 1912 Summer Olympics in Stockholm and took it as an inspiration for the creation of the German Sports Badge.

== Requirements ==
The Idrottsmärke consists of five different groups that had to be passed. The requirements changed during the time of its existence. In 1910, the requirements were as follows:

Group	Discipline
I	200 m swimming, gymnastics
II	High jump, long jump
II	100/400/1500 m Running
IV	Fencing, discus throw, shot-put, javelin throw
V	10 km run, 1000 m swimming, 20 km cycling, participation in a final of a football tournament

== See also ==
- German Sports Badge
- Austrian Sports Badge

== Links ==
- Idrottsmärke on DigitaltMuseum.se (Retrieved 2020-07-29)
- Riksidrottsmärke on myvimu.com (Retrieved 2020-07-29)
- Sandra Heck: Von spielenden Soldaten und kämpfenden Athleten. Göttingen: Vandenhoeck & Ruprecht, 11. December 2013, p. 130 (Retrieved 2020-07-29)
