= German swimming badge =

The German swimming badge (German: Deutsches Schwimmabzeichen) is awarded by members of the Wasserwacht of the German Red Cross and the DLRG for completing certain requirements and for demonstrating swimming skills.

== Requirements ==
=== German swimming badge in bronze ===
- swim at least 200 meters in 15 minutes: 150 meters on the front or the back, 50 meters on the other side
- 1x Diving to a depth of 2 meters and retrieving a ring
- Proficiency in swimming rules
- One jump from springboard of 1 meter height

=== German swimming badge in silver ===
- swim at least 400 meters in 20 minutes: 300 meters on the front or the back, 100 meters on the other side
- 2x Diving to a depth of 2 meters and retrieving a ring
- 10 meters underwater swim on one breath
- One jump from springboard of 3 meters height or two different jumps from 1 meter height
- Proficiency in swimming rules

=== German swimming badge in gold ===
- swim at least 800 meters in 30 minutes: 650 meters on the front or the back, 150 on the other side
- 50 meters breaststroke in less than 1 minute and 50 seconds
- 25 meters crawl
- 50 meters backstroke (50 meters in upside-down position with without arm activity) or 50 meter backcrawl
- 3x Diving to a depth of 2 meters and retrieving a ring in 3 minutes
- 10 meters underwater swim on one breath, started from swimming
- One jump from a springboard of 3 meters height or two different jumps from 1 meter height
- 50 meters rescue pulling or pushing stroke
- Proficiency in swimming rules
- Knowledge of hazards and rescue measures for boat accidents or ice accidents

== Unofficial badges ==
=== Badge for constant swimming ===
The Dauerschwimmer badge is awarded in

- Bronze for one hour
- Silver for one hour and a half
- Gold for two hours of constant swimming.

The design of the patch features a death's head. Due to the danger of hypothermia during the long exposure to water many swim coaches or lifeguards offer the badge for constant swimming only under strict conditions or not at all.

== See also ==
- German rescue swimming badge
- List of German Sports Badges
