= List of water sports =

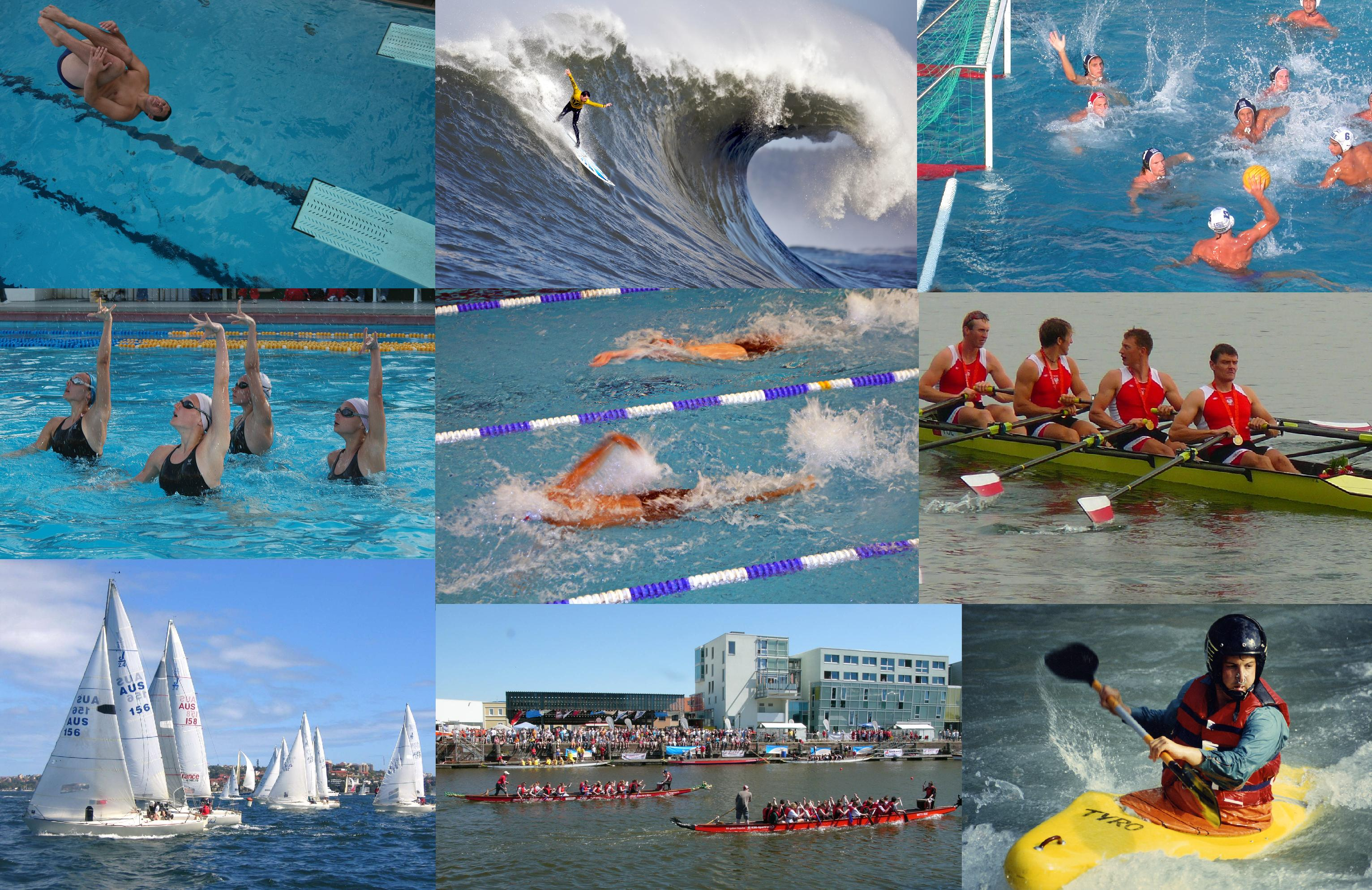
A variety of water sports; from top left: diving, surfing, water polo, synchronized swimming, swimming, rowing, yacht racing, dragon boat racing, kayaking.

Water sports or aquatic sports are sports activities conducted on waterbodies and can be categorized according to the degree of immersion by the participants.

== On the water ==
- Boat racing, the use of powerboats to participate in races
- Boating, the use of boats for personal recreation
- Bodyboarding similar to surfing, it involves catching a wave aboard a floating board — only this platform is made primarily of foam.
- Cable skiing, similar to wake boarding but with cables for artificial maneuvering
- Canoe polo combines boating and ball-handling skills with a contact team game, where tactics and positional play are as important as the speed and fitness of the individual athletes.
- Canoeing is an activity which involves paddling a canoe with a single-bladed paddle. Most present-day canoeing is done as or as a part of a sport or recreational activity.
- Canyoning is a sport that involves traveling through canyons using a variety of techniques, such as walking, scrambling, climbing, jumping, abseiling (rappelling), swimming, and rafting
- Dragon boat racing, teams of 20 paddlers racing the ancient dragon boat
- Fishing, the recreation and sport of catching fish
- Flyboard is a brand of hydroflighting device that supplies propulsion to drive the Flyboard into the air to perform a sport known as hydroflying.
- Jet Skiing is performed with a recreational watercraft that the rider sits or stands on, rather than sits inside of, as in a boat.
- Kayaking is the use of a kayak for moving across water
- Kiteboating is the act of using a kite rig as a power source to propel a boat
- Kneeboarding is an aquatic sport where the participant is towed on a buoyant, convex, and hydrodynamically shaped board at a planing speed, most often behind a motorboat.
- Paddleboarding, where a person uses a large surfboard and paddle to surf on flat water or waves
- Parasailing, where a person is towed behind a vehicle (usually a boat) while attached to a parachute
- Picigin is a traditional Croatian ball game that is played on the beach. It is an amateur sport played in shallow water, consisting of players keeping a small ball from touching the water.
- Rafting is a recreational outdoor activities that use an inflatable raft to navigate a river or other body of water
- River trekking, a combination of trekking and climbing and sometimes swimming along the river
- Rowing, a sport that involves propelling a boat (racing shell) on water, using oars
- Sailing is the practice of navigating a sail-powered craft on water, ice, or land
- Sit-down hydrofoiling is riding on the water with a hydrofoil attached to a ski.
- Skimboarding is a sport where people use a wooden board to slide fast on water.
- Stone skipping, is a sport where people compete for the number of times and length that they can skip a stone on the water's surface.
- Surfing, a sport where an individual uses a board to stand up and ride on the face of a wave.
- Wakeboarding, a sport where an individual is attached to a board via bindings and then holds a handle to be towed across the water while riding sideways.
- Wakeskating, a sport where the rider stands on a board and is towed across the water performing maneuvers similar to those seen in skateboarding.
- Wakesurfing, a sport where the individual surfs on the wake created by a boat without holding onto the handle.
- Water skiing, a sport where an individual holds onto a rope and handle while being towed across the water while riding one or two water skis.
- White water rafting, rafting on various classes of river rapids
- Windsurfing, is a wind-propelled water sport that is a combination of sailing and surfing.
- Windfoiling, is the hydrofoiling variant of windsurfing. It uses a hydrofoil that lifts the board above the water.
- Wing foiling is a sport where an individual holds a lightweight wing on a surfboard with a hydrofoil.
- Yachting is the use of recreational boats and ships called yachts, for racing or cruising

== In the water ==
- Aquajogging, is a cross-training and rehabilitation method using low-impact resistance training. It is a way to train without impacting joints. Participants wear a flotation device and move in a running motion in the deep end of a pool. Aside from a pool, the equipment can include a flotation belt and weights.
- Artistic or synchronized swimming consists of swimmers performing a synchronized routine of elaborate moves in the water, accompanied by music.
- Diving, the sport of jumping off springboards or platforms into water
- Finswimming is a sport similar to traditional swimming using fins, monofin, snorkel, and other specific devices
- Modern pentathlon includes épée fencing, pistol shooting, swimming, a show jumping course on horseback, and cross country running
- Rescue swimming is swimming to rescue other swimmers
- Swimming, including pool swimming and open water swimming
- Synchronized diving, Two divers form a team and perform dives simultaneously. The dives are identical.
- Triathlon, a multi-sport event involving the completion of three continuous and sequential endurance events, usually a combination of swimming, cycling, and running
- Water aerobics is aerobics in the water.
- Water basketball, mixes the rules of basketball and water polo, played in a swimming pool. Teams of five players must shoot at the goal with a ball within a specific time after gaining possession.
- Water polo is a sport of two teams played in the water with a ball.
- Water volleyball

== Under water ==
=== Recreational diving ===
- Cave diving
- Deep diving
- Freediving
- Ice diving
- Mermaiding
- Spearfishing
- Underwater archaeology, particularly activity involving wreck diving
- Underwater photography, including underwater videography, is photography done underwater. Numerous contests worldwide are arranged every year. Digital cameras have revolutionized how many divers participate.
- Underwater videography

=== Underwater sports ===
- Aquathlon (underwater wrestling)
- Finswimming, some events are practiced completely underwater
- Freediving
- Snorkeling is the practice of swimming at the surface (typically of the sea) being equipped with a mask, fins, and a short tube called a snorkel.
- Spearfishing
- Sport diving (sport)
- Underwater football
- Underwater hockey is a game played underwater which has some similarities to hockey. Two teams of players use short wooden curved sticks to move a heavy puck across the pool bottom to the opponents' goal.
- Underwater ice hockey
- Underwater orienteering
- Underwater photography (sport)
- Underwater rugby is a game played underwater which has some similarities to rugby football. Two teams try to score goals by sending a slightly negatively buoyant ball into the opponents' goal placed on the bottom of the pool.
- Underwater target shooting

== See also ==
- List of beach sports
- Outdoor recreation
- Outline of canoeing and kayaking
