= AE-COPSD Sports badge =

European association of the Bodies and Public Organisms of Security and of Defense
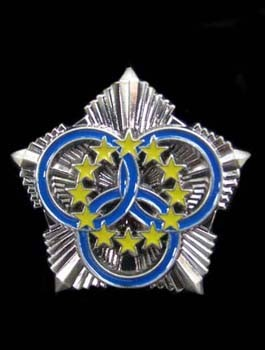
- Type: Police decoration
- Awarded for: Physical fitness
- Description: Comes in three classes. gold, silver & bronze
- Presented by: AE-COPSD
- Eligibility: Police officers
- Status: Currently awarded
- Established: December 01, 1981

The AE-COPSD Sport badge (French, Brevet Sportif des Polices Européennes (B.S.P.E.); English, "European Police Sports Badge") is a decoration awarded by the European association of the Bodies and Public Organisms of Security and of Defense (French, Association Européenne des Membres de Corps et Organismes Publics de Sécurité et de Défense (AE-COPSD)). To be awarded the sports badge, participants must meet the standards in their choice of event within each of the seven listed categories. The badge is awarded based upon performance in ether Bronze, Silver, and Gold. The participant may compete for the badge on an annual basis. AE-COPSD personnel must grade and certify each event. The three grades are awarded based on the number of points earned.
The events are:

- high jump
- long jump
- 75 meter run
- 300 meter run or 100 meter swim for women
- 400 meter run or 100 meter swim run for men
- 1000 meter run
- shot put or stone put
- 200 meter swim
- 2000 meter run or 1000 meter swim for women
- 3000 meter run or 1000 meter swim for men.

== See also ==
- AE-COPSD Paratroopers Wings
- World Police and Fire Games
- European Police Achievement Badge

== Sources ==
- Brevet Sportif des Polices Européennes. Association Européenne des Membres de Corps et Organismes Publics de Sécurité et de Défense (AE-COPSD) website (in French)
