= Wasserwacht =

German lifeguard service

- Wasserwacht
- Formation: February 7, 1883; 143 years ago
- Founded at: Regensburg, Germany
- Type: NGO
- Headquarters: Berlin, Germany
- Region served: Germany
- Members: 137,000
- Official language: German
- Key people: Alexander Radwan (President)
- Website: www.wasserwacht.de

The Wasserwacht (German pronunciation: [ˈvasɐvaxt]; water watch or water guard) is a German lifeguard service. It is one of the five voluntary societies of the German Red Cross. The Wasserwacht is a non-profit organization made up of on volunteers.

== Tasks ==
The main task of the Wasserwacht is the prevention of drowning. The Wasserwacht's activities encompass many areas, including:

=== Swimming (Schwimmen) ===
A task of the Wasserwacht is the training of nonswimmers and the continuation of swimming education among the population. Badges are awarded based on the level of education, and begin with the "Seepferdchen" (literally seahorse; the early certificate) up to the Gold German Swimming Badge.

=== Rescue Swimming (Rettungsschwimmen) ===
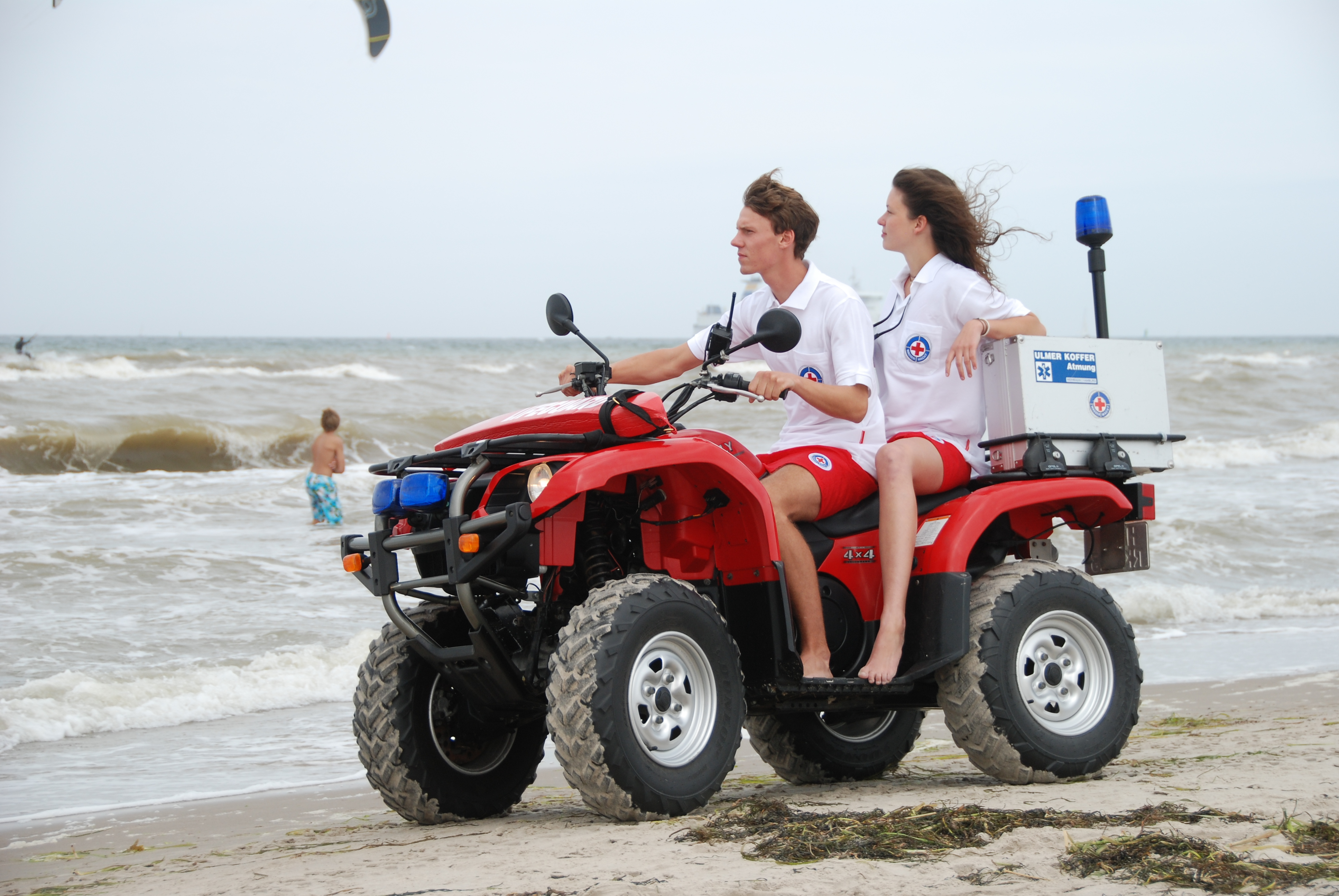
ATV used by Wasserwacht Lifeguards

This group is responsible for the education and training of lifeguards, swiftwater rescuers and rescue swimmers. It cooperates with German civil protection and German fire services, especially concerning floods.

- Teaching of swimming, rescue swimming (German rescue swimming badge) and first aid to the population, especially youth, in schools and federations
- Organization of competitions in life saving

=== Boating (Motorboot) ===
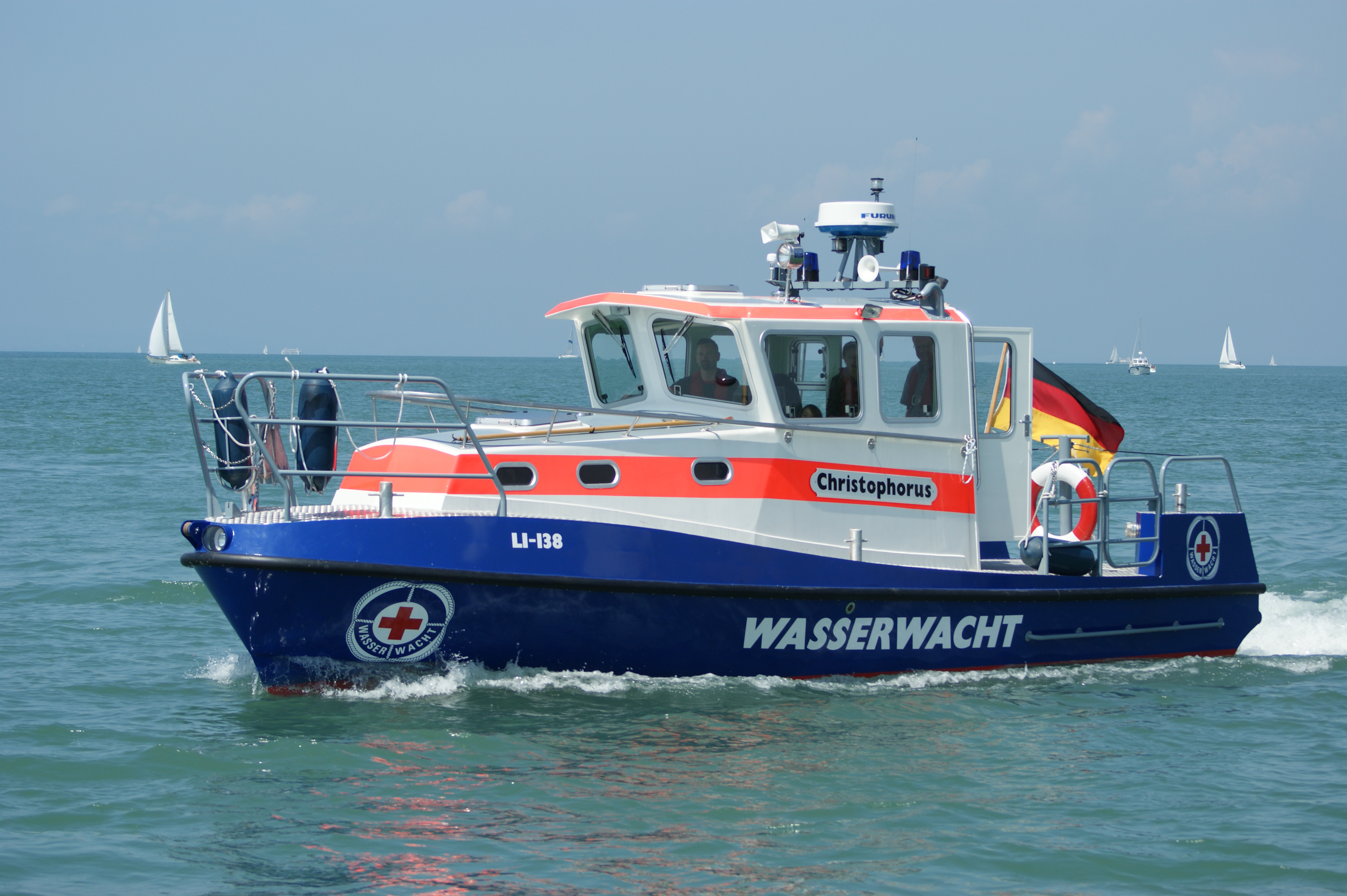
Wasserwacht vessel on Lake Constance

The Wasserwacht provides live-saving services on most lakes in as well as on the coast of Germany. Therefore, they require fast and powerful transportation in case of an emergency. The Wasserwacht oversees regattas and sailing meetings.

=== Rescue diving (Rettungstauchen) ===
Rescue divers are needed for the salvaging of goods, vehicles, garbage, and corpses. The education of a rescue diver usually takes one to two years. Each active rescue diver of the Wasserwacht is required to undergo a dive-medical investigation annually.

=== Environmental protection (Naturschutz) ===
A task of the Wasserwacht is helping to keep nature and waterways clean.

In order to accomplish these tasks the Wasserwacht educates interested people with qualified technical abilities from the other departments of the German Red Cross.

== History ==
The Bavarian city Regensburg is considered to be the birthplace of the lifeguard service of the German Red Cross. In 1883, during a flood, German Red Cross aids were used for the first time. In the following years, "Sanität und Wasserwehrkolonnen" (medical and water rescue stations) developed along the coast and inland waters.

After World War II, the Wasserwacht, as a government organization, was forbidden by the allied military administration. But the Bavarian Red Cross, Bavarian regional organization of the German Red Cross, received permission to resume its work. Other regional organizations followed the example of Bavaria and reinstated their lifeguard services.

Logo of the Wasserwacht before 2020

== Schnelleinsatzgruppen ==
For the execution of emergency services on water, the Wasserwacht maintains Schnelleinsatzgruppen (emergency response units). The groups are usually equipped with special lifeguard and emergency service machinery.

== See also ==
- DLRG
- German Red Cross
- German rescue swimming badge
