= German Sports Badge =

Annual sports award in Germany

Deutsches Sportabzeichen
- German Sports Badge ribbon bar in Bronze
- Type: Badge and Ribbon
- Awarded for: physical fitness
- Description: Comes in three classes: gold, silver and bronze
- Presented by: German Olympic Sports Federation DOSB
- Eligibility: Civilians, Soldiers of the German armed forces and Allied nations (military version)
- Status: Currently awarded
- Established: November 10, 1912 (civil version)
- Website: https://www.deutsches-sportabzeichen.de/

Logo of the Deutsches Sportabzeichen

The German Sports Badge (Deutsches Sportabzeichen) is a state-recognized Federal Decoration of the Federal Republic of Germany, established by law and administered by the German Olympic Sports Confederation (DOSB). It is an official honor of the German State, awarded under a regulated national framework of performance standards, and is legally protected under the German Law on Titles, Orders, and Honours (Ordensgesetz).

The German Sports Badge is widely regarded as the highest award of the German Olympic Sports Confederation outside competitive sport, recognising comprehensive physical achievement across endurance, strength, speed and coordination disciplines.

The badge is administered by the DOSB and implemented nationally through Germany’s state and district sports federations, with testing conducted by certified examiners both within Germany and abroad.

== History ==
The German Sports Badge, also known as the German National Sports Badge, was first created in the year 1913, and is one of the oldest German awards still in active circulation. At first the German Sports Badge was only issued to men for the completion of various physical tests. In 1921 it was renamed the Deutsches Turn- und Sportabzeichen, and women became eligible to receive it as well.

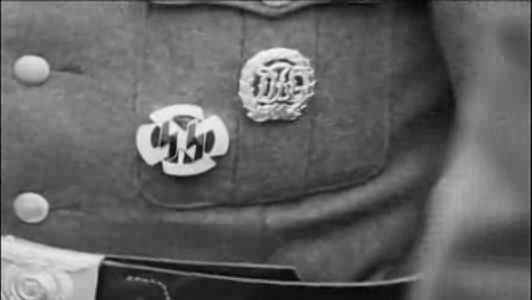
A 1944 SS-uniform with the German Sports Badge; to its lower left the Germanic Proficiency Runes

In Nazi Germany the design of the badge remained basically the same but a swastika was added at its base. Since 1935, the letters "DRL" ("Deutscher Reichsbund für Leibesübungen") replaced the letters "DRA" ("Deutscher Reichsausschuss für Leibesübungen"). On 1 July 1937 it was renamed to Deutsche Reichsauszeichnung für Leibesübungen and obtained the status as an official recognised decoration of the state. In 1938, the Austrian Sports Badge was incorporated in the German Sports badge. The last tests for the Deutsche Reichsauszeichnung für Leibesübungen were held in 1944.

After World War II, the German Sports Badge was reinstated 1952 by the German Sports Association in West Germany and continued in this status after the German reunification. it has been approved and awarded by the President of Germany since 4 July 1958 and can be worn on Bundeswehr, Bundespolizei and Technisches Hilfswerk uniforms.

In 1993 the DOSB opened an international office called Ausland which allows non-Germans to organize, participate and obtain the DSA outside Germany, but only under supervision of an authorized Verein (sport organisation) and authorized Pruefer (judge); the decoration can be awarded to any person participating in the test.

In 2007, the letters changed from "DSB" ("Deutscher Sportbund") to "DOSB" (German Olympic Sports Federation).

The structure of the German Sports Badge was changed in 2013 to its current form.

The German Sports Badge has also been made an entry requirement for certain German Police services.

== Requirements ==
=== Present day ===
The workgroup Projektgruppe Deutsches Sportabzeichen of the German Olympic Sports Association announced various changes for the German Sports Badge. The following changes and various further changes were in full power by 2013:

- Basic and advanced levels, as seen on the Austrian Sports Badge were introduced. Formerly the grades bronze, silver, and gold were awarded according to the number of yearly repetitions.

Since 2013 the grades are determined by the score which is achieved. In each discipline, a score between one and three points can be earned. The final score determine the grade of the sports badge: Bronze: 4–7 Silver: 8–10 Gold: 11–12

- Rearranging the age groups
- Adapting the requirements to modern standards
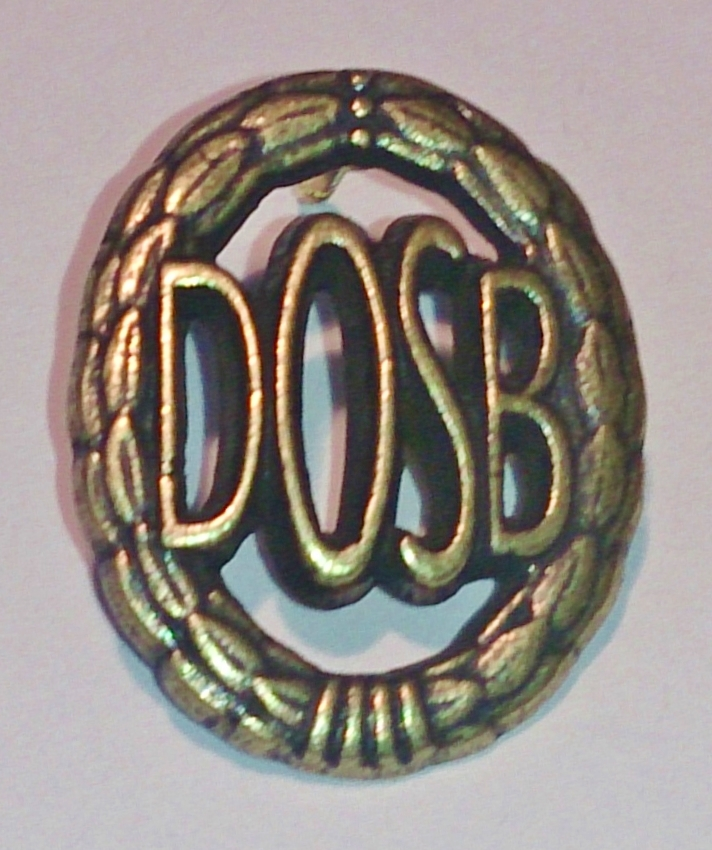
German Sports Badge lapel pin in bronze as awarded by the German Olympic Sports Federation

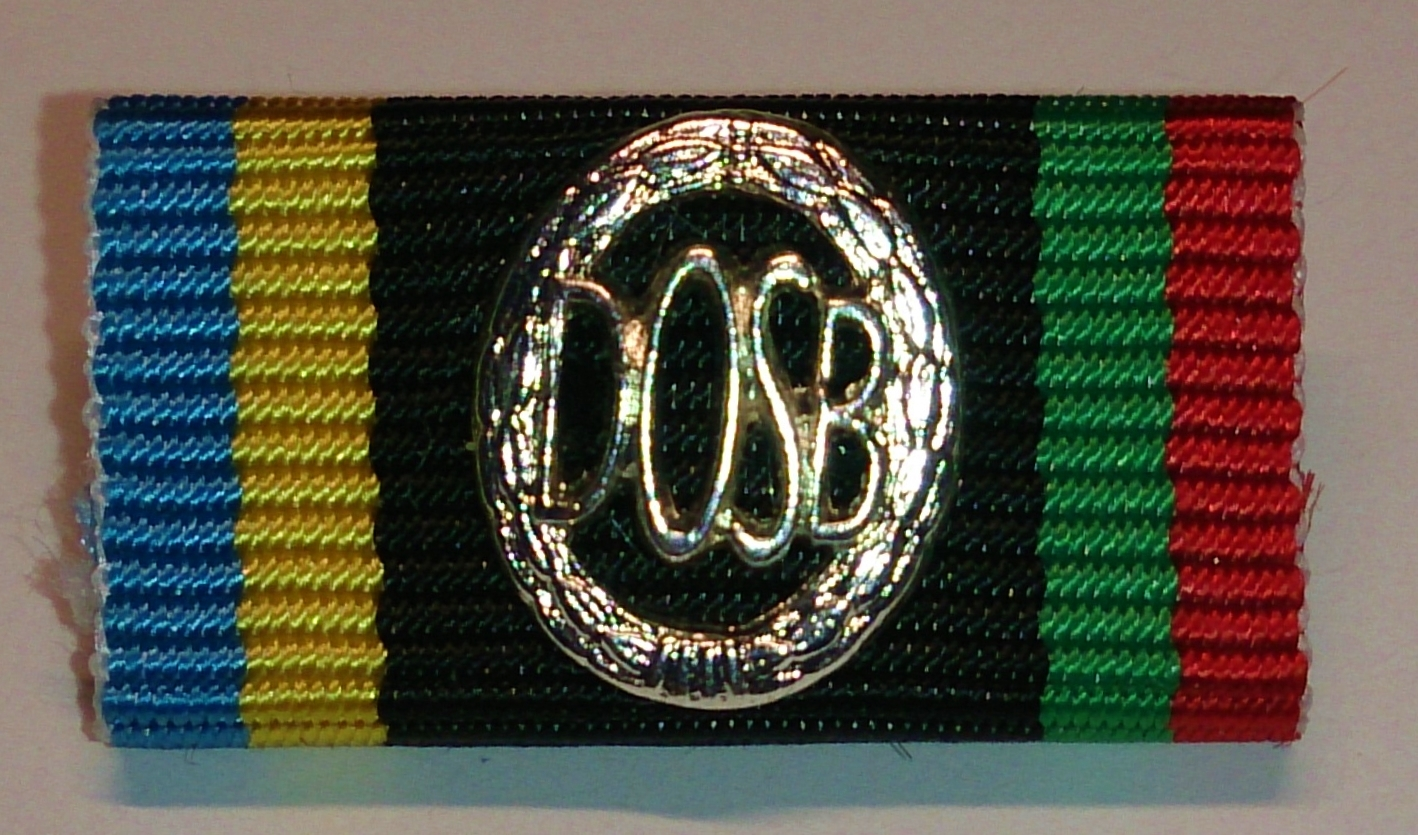
German Sports Badge ribbon in silver as awarded by the German Olympic Sports Federation

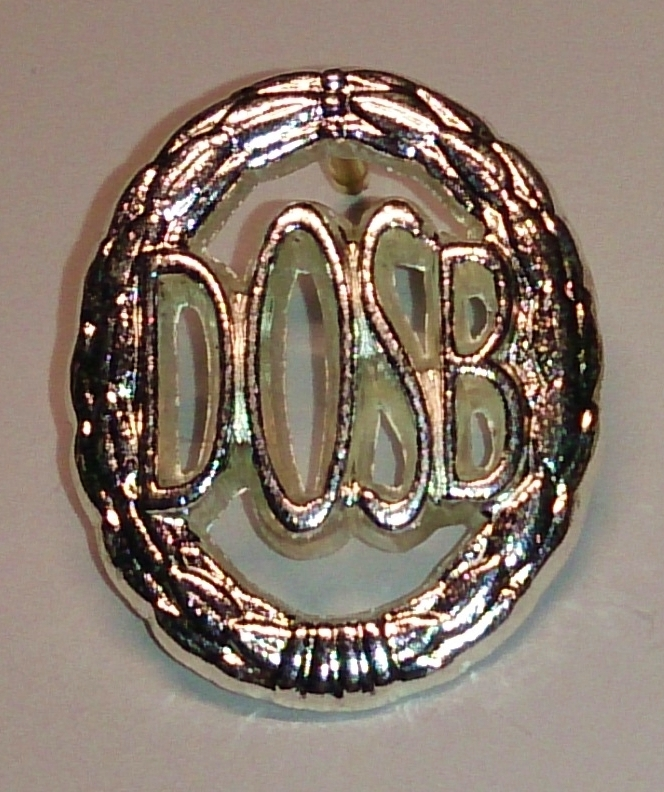
German Sports Badge lapel pin in silver as awarded by the German Olympic Sports Federation

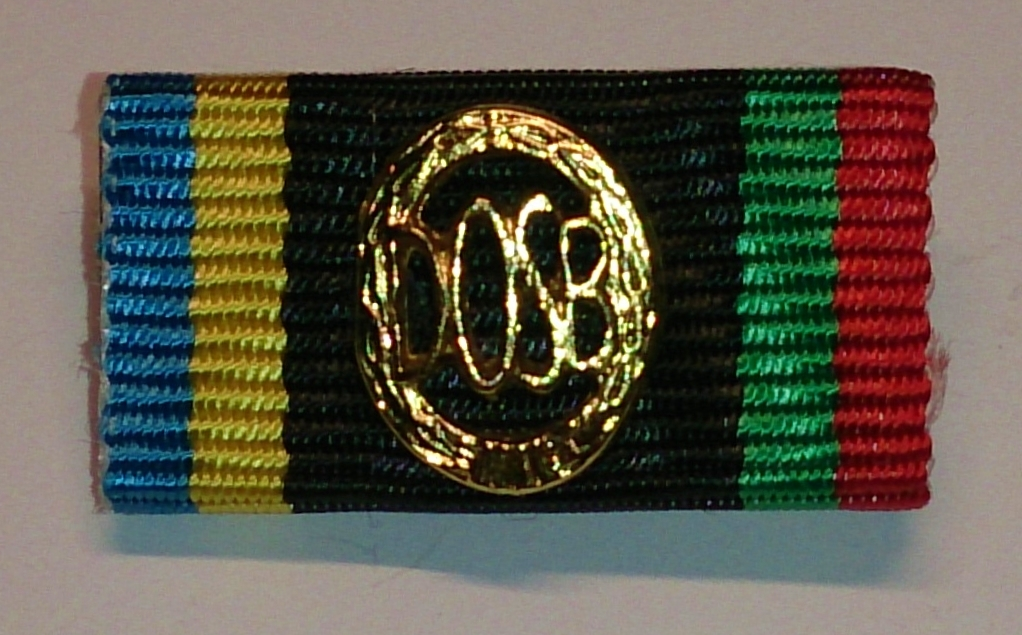
German Sports Badge ribbon in gold as awarded by the German Olympic Sports Federation

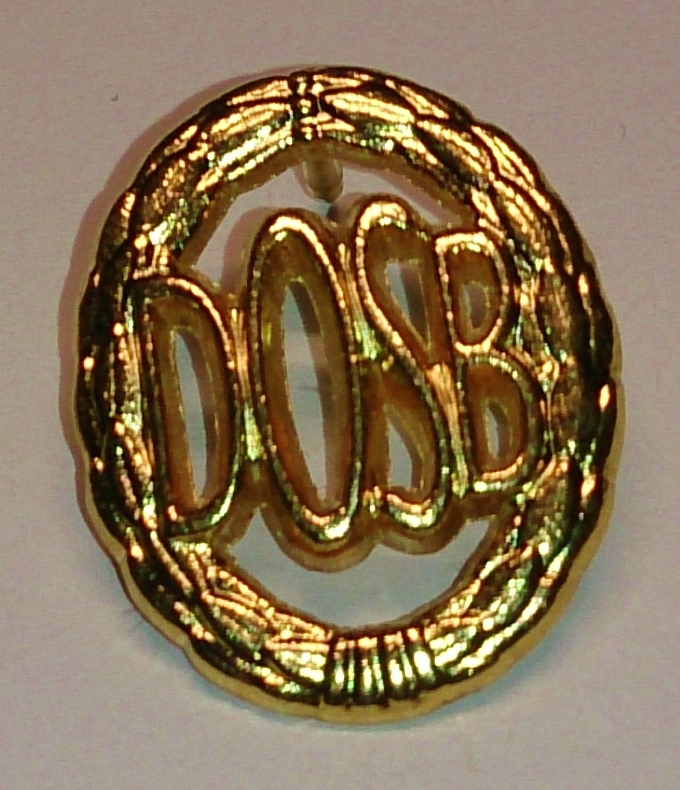
German Sports Badge lapel pin in gold as awarded by the German Olympic Sports Federation

Special awards:

- German Sports Badge for juveniles Deutsches Sportabzeichen für Kinder und Jugendliche
- German Sports Badge with special requirements for handicapped persons.

=== Ability to swim ===
The ability to swim must be demonstrated by either a 12-minute swim, the completion of a swimming test of the other disciplines, or by completion of a German swimming badge.

=== Endurance ===
One of:

- 3,000 m run,
- 10 km run,
- 7.5 km power-walking,
- or 20 km cycling.

=== Strength ===
Stone- or shot-put, apparatus gymnastics, standing long-jump

=== Speed ===
50m- or 100m sprint, 25m swim, 200m bicycling, apparatus gymnastics

=== Agility ===
High-jump or Long-jump, rope skipping, or leap frogging

=== Acceptance of sports badges from different sports ===
Certain disciplines may be substituted with sports badges from other sports. For instance: Endurance can be substituted with the German rescue swimming badge, triathlon badge, running badge, or pentathlon badge. Agility can be substituted with the German Ju-Jutsu badge, German track and field badge, and others.

=== Requirements until 2013 ===
Until 2013, the following requirements had to be completed to be awarded the sports badge (Requirements vary according to age category and gender):

Group	Section	Disciplines	Substitutes
1	Swimming	50 or 200 meters swim	none
2	Jumping power	High-jump or Long-jump	Pommel horse or leap frogging
3	Speed	50/75/100/400/1000 meter run, 300/500 bicycling or 300/500 meters inline-skating	Ice-skating
4	Physical strength	Stone- or shot-put, 100 meter swim	Shooting sports, Bench press or weightlifting, Canoeing or rowing
5	Endurance	800/1000/2000/3000/5000 meters run, 5000/10000 meters inline-skating, 10 kilometers walk, 7 kilometers Walking/Nordic Walking, 20 kilometers bicycling, 600/1.000 meters swim cross-country skiing	Canoeing, rowing, bowling or ice-skating

== Sportabzeichen judge ==
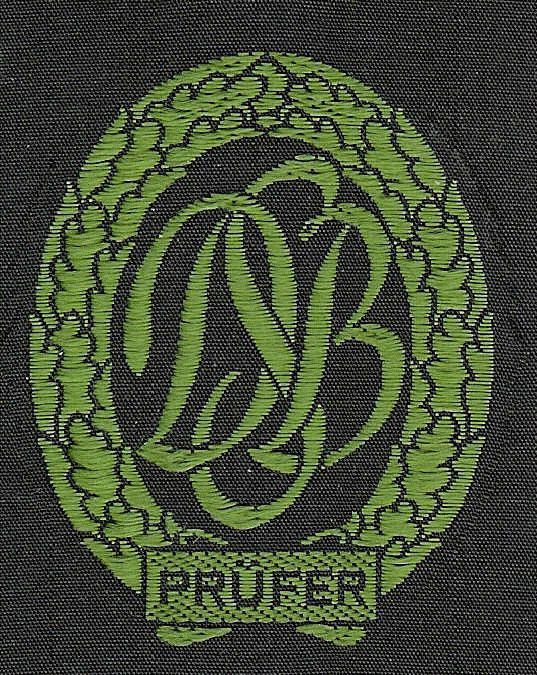
German Sports Badge of a judge.

Prospective judges (Prüfer) have to fulfill certain requirements in order to obtain judging qualifications and licence (Prüfausweis):

- Membership in a German sports club (Vereine).
- Have completed a German Sports Badge (Repetitive completion on a yearly basis is preferred).
- Previous experience of assisting a judge for the German Sports Badge.
- Licensed sports coach or completion of judging class.

A license for a judge is valid for a period of four years. The licence can be obtained from DOSB only via German sports club (Vereine).

German school physical education instructors and Bundeswehr instructors underlie different requirements.

German citizenship for a judge is not required, however, the judge has to be holding the tests for a German sports association (Vereine), a German school or the German military. However, exceptions can be made in special cases. In general the non German Prüfer are foreign citizens around the world with German origin or family; exceptions are known in Denmark, as a Danish National who was made judge for the Danish Emergency Management Agency, due to the fact that Denmark had no Sportsabzeichen-judges; another significant exception is in Italy where within the Italian Armed Forces the German Sport Badge become popular since 2003 and now there are 5 Italians holding the Prüfausweis (licence to be a judge).

The badge for a judge (Prüferabzeichen) was similar in shape as a regular sports badge, however, the color is green and it features a banner with the inscription Prüfer. The Prüferabzeichen is no longer awarded, instead a T-shirt with the text "Sportsabzeichen team" is given out.

Judges (Prüfer) for the German Sports Badge may also judge the following badges:

- Austrian Sports Badge
- European Police Achievement Badge
- Bavarian Sports Badge
- Deutscher Leichtathletik-Verband Running Badge

Design for Military Personnel:

The ribbon is red, green, black, yellow and blue with the badge in the center. In 2007, the letters were replaced by DOSB

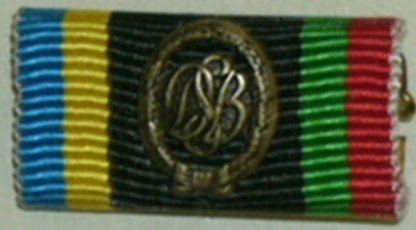
German ribbon format

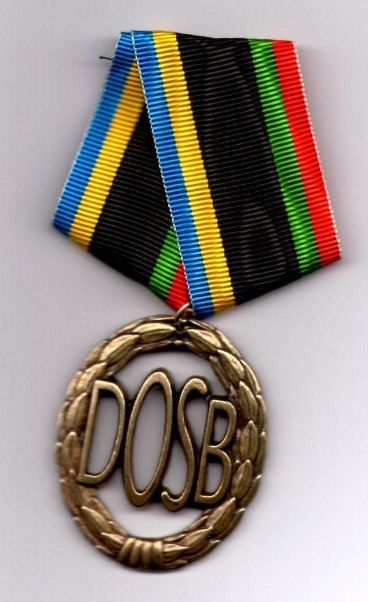
The post-2007 bronze badge suspended in a Danish style ribbon, for wear on uniforms

== Bavarian Sports Badge ==
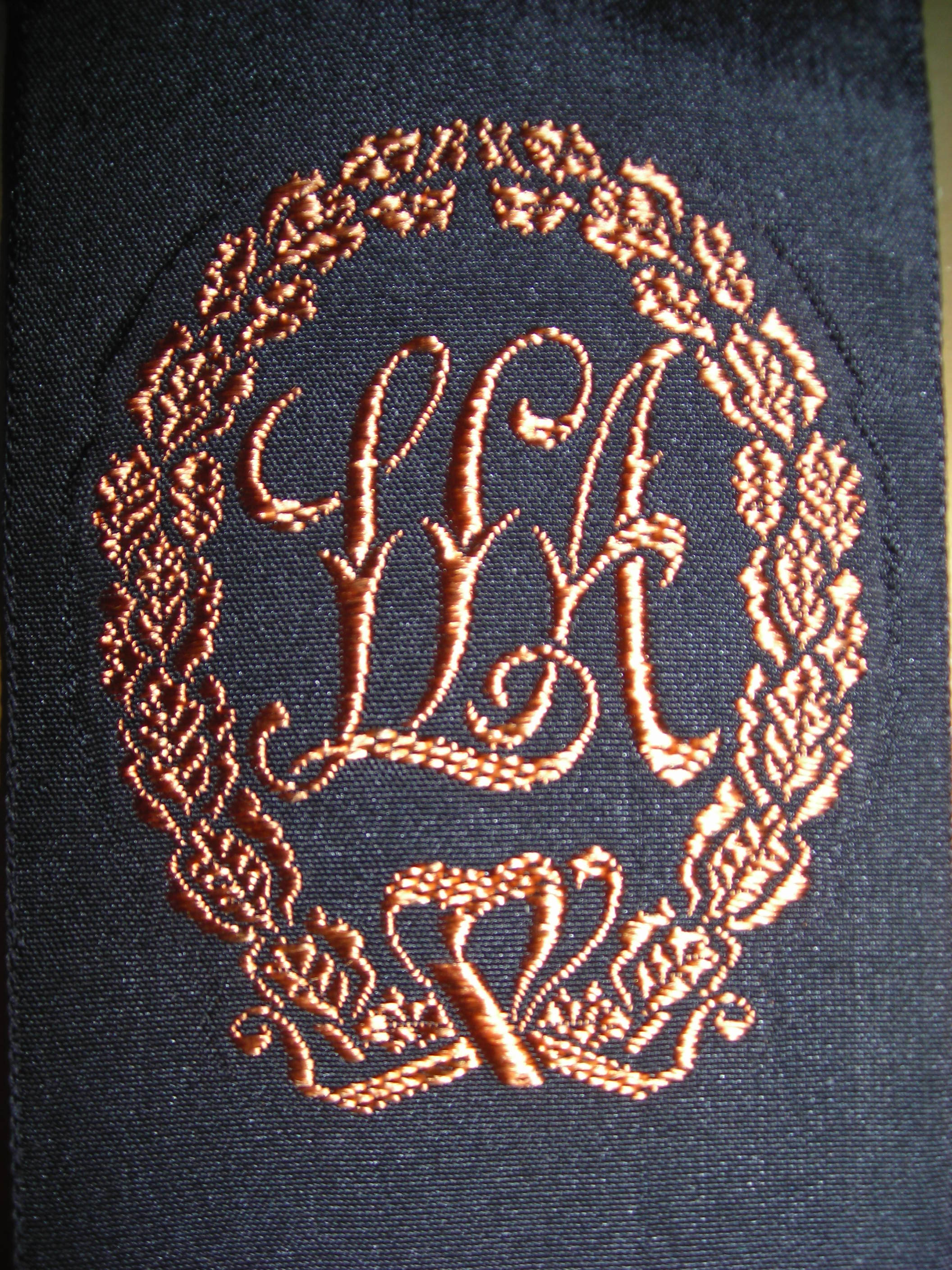
The Bavarian Sports Badge

The Bavarian Sports Badge (German Bayerisches Sport-Leistungs Abzeichen or BSLA) was a sports badge awarded by the Bavarian Athletes Organization (Bayrischer Landes-Sportverband). Due to the reform of the German Sports Badge, which from 2013 has also been awarded for difference performance levels, the Bavarian Sports Badge ceased to be awarded from 2013.

The Bavarian Sports Badge is comparable to the German Sports Badge, however, differences exist:

- The letters SLA instead of DOSB are shown in the award
- The bronze, silver and gold awards indicate the level of difficulty instead of the number of repetitions
- Higher requirements must be fulfilled in order to be awarded the sports badge
- The German Sports Badge may be worn on some countries military uniforms as an official German decoration, but the Bavarian may not.

== See also ==
- Order of Merit Cross of the German Federal Republic
- Awards and decorations of the German Armed Forces
- European Police Achievement Badge
- Austrian Sports Badge
- German rescue swimming badge
- List of German Sports Badges
- Sportsman of the Year (Germany)
