= AE-COPSD Paratroopers Wings =

European association of the Bodies and Public Organisms of Security and of Defense
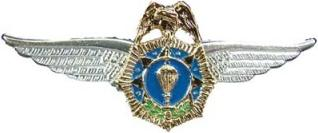
- Type: Police decoration
- Awarded for: Minimum of four static line jumps
- Presented by: AE-COPSD
- Eligibility: Police officers / Security Personnel
- Status: Currently awarded
- Established: 6 December 1981

The AE-COPSD European Police Parachuting Brevet (BPPE) (French: Brevet Parachutiste du Policier Européen (BPPE)) is a decoration awarded by the European Association of Bodies and Public Organizations of Security and Defense (French: Association Européenne des Membres de Corps et Organismes Publics de Sécurité et de Défense (AE-COPSD)).

== Requirements ==
Officers can qualify for the AE-COPSD European Police Parachuting Brevet (BPPE) by the following requirements:

- Making a joint jump into a jump zone in the presence of an authorised AE-COPSD inspector, and carrying out a minimum of four jumps in automatic static line parachutes.
- Officers can also achieve the badge by equivalence, for those who already have their countries parachute certification.

== See also ==
- AE-COPSD Sports badge
