= European Association of Bodies and Public Organizations of Security and Defense =

AE-COPSD
- European Association of Bodies and Public Organisations of Security and Defense
- Association Européenne des Corps et Organismes Publiques de Sécurité et de Défense
- Founded: December 04, 1981
- Headquarters: Paris, France
- Location: All over the world
- Key people: Gerard Fritz, president

The European Association of Bodies and Public Organisations of Security and Defence (known in French as Association Européenne des Corps et Organismes Publiques de Sécurité et de Défense or AE-COPSD) is a non-profit, voluntary association of individuals who work in various law enforcement agencies and detachments across Europe. Its primary purpose is to organize and promote joint training and skills development activities for law enforcement professionals who work in police, corrections, military police, and other first responder units in various European nations.

They also organises recreational events and competitions for its members. These include shooting competitions where members are encouraged to compete in various national marksmanship competitions. In addition to encouraging participation in international (European) sports competitions, they also organizes events where individuals from member agencies compete for the AE-COPSD Sports badge.

Some of the more notable and participated events are the paratrooper events were the host country has a certified military jump master at the jump zone. This is because many members are also in their countries military reserve. They can be awarded Jump Wings from the host country and also the AE-COPSD Paratroopers Wings.

AE-COPSD also awards the AE-COPSD European Police Cross of Honor. This medal can be awarded to any law enforcement official from any country who, in the opinion of AE-COPSD; shows the highest standards of Loyalty, Integrity & Courage. The Cross of Honor is not limited to professionals from Europe.
