= European Police Achievement Badge =

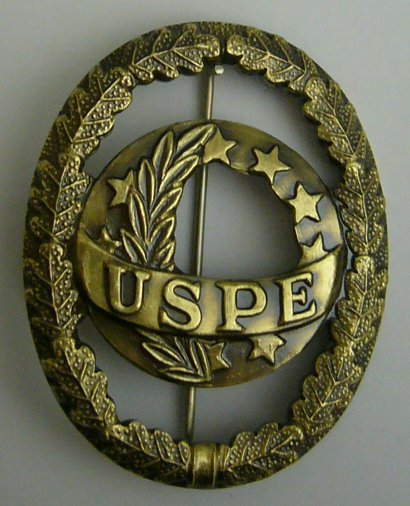
- European Police Achievement Badge in bronze
- Type: Badge & Ribbon
- Awarded for: Marksmanship and physical fitness
- Description: Awarded in three classes: gold, silver and bronze
- Presented by: Union Sportive des Polices d'Europe
- Eligibility: Members of European security services
- Status: Currently awarded
- Established: 1982
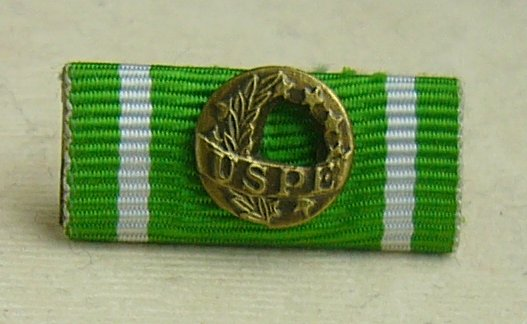
- European Police Achievement Badge in bronze as a ribbon

The European Police Achievement Badge (German: Europäisches Polizei Leistungsabzeichen (EPLA)) (French: Brevet Sportif du Policier Européen) is a decoration offered by the European Police Sports Association (Union Sportive des Polices d'Europe, USPE). It is awarded for proficiency in marksmanship, swimming, and running. The award may be worn as a badge or as a ribbon.

== History ==
In 1982 the member states of the USPE decided to establish the European Police Achievement Badge in order to promote unity among the European police services and as an incentive for sports in police services.

== Eligibility ==
All members of European security services are eligible. For instance members of the police services, military service members, or members of customs.

== Requirements ==
The requirements have to be fulfilled within one year. The requirements vary according to age category and gender.

=== Marksmanship ===
- Stance: Standing, one or both hands are permitted.
- Four sets of five rounds over a distance of 25 meters
- 30 seconds time limit per set
- 9×19mm Parabellum ammunition

=== Swimming ===
- Freestyle swimming
- Distance of 300 meters

=== Run ===
- 3000 meters

== See also ==
- AE-COPSD Sports badge (French, Brevet Sportif des Polices Européennes (B.S.P.E.); English, "European Police Sports Badge")
- German Sports Badge
- German Armed Forces Badge for Military Proficiency

== Sources ==
- Europäisches Polizei Leistungsabzeichen (in German)
