= Running Badge =

Award of the German Athletics Association

The Running Badge (German: Laufabzeichen) is an award of the German Athletics Association. Various levels of the Running Badge are awarded for the completion of running for certain periods. The Running Badge can be awarded either as a cloth patch or as a pin.

== Levels ==
Laufabzeichen

- 15-minute run
- 30-minute run
- 60-minute run
- 90-minute run
- 120-minute run
- Marathon (42.19 km)
Running Badge Level 1

Running Badge Level 2

Running Badge Level 3

Running Badge Level 4

Running Badge Level 5

Running Badge Marathon

Walkingabzeichen (Power walking patch)

- 30-minute power walking
- 60-minute power walking
- 120-minute power walking
Walking Badge Level 1

Walking Badge Level 2

Walking Badge Level 3

== Judges ==
- German Sports Badge judges
- Coaches
- Physical education teachers
