= German track and field badge =

Annual sports award in Germany

The German track and field badge (German:Mehrkampfabzeichen) is a sports badge awarded by the German Athletics Organization.

== Requirements ==
The award ia available in three classes (bronze, silver and gold) depending on the score.

Furthermore, it is possible to compete in either triathlon, pentathlon or decathlon.

=== Triathlon ===
- 100m sprint
- Long jump
- Shot-put

=== Pentathlon ===
- long jump
- Javelin throw
- Ball throw
- Discus throw
- 1500m walk

=== Decathlon ===
- 100 metres
- Long jump
- Shot put
- High jump
- 400 metres
- 110 metres hurdles
- Discus throw
- Pole vault
- Javelin throw
- 1500 metres

== See also ==
- German Sports Badge
