= Austrian Sports Badge =

Österreichisches Sport- und Turnabzeichen
- Type: Badge
- Awarded for: physical fitness
- Description: Awarded in three classes: gold, silver and bronze
- Presented by: the Republic of Austria
- Eligibility: Civilians
- Status: Currently awarded
- Established: 1920
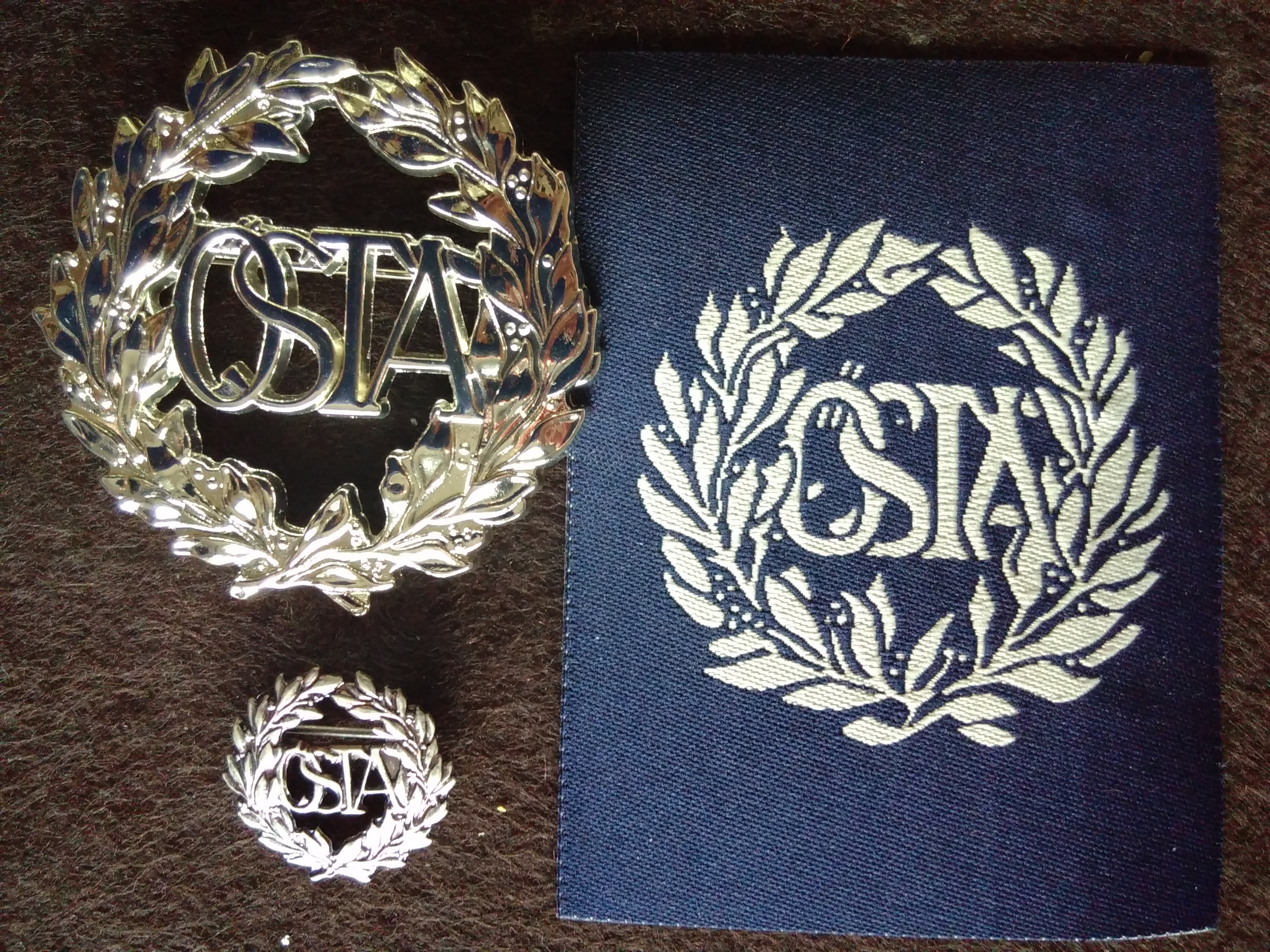
- Basic Level in Silver

The Austrian Sports Badge (German: Das Österreichische Sport- und Turnabzeichen, ÖSTA) is a decoration presented for physical fitness by the Republic of Austria.

== History ==
The Austrian Sports Badge was created in 1920 as a sports badge, similar to other sports badges offered by Germany or Sweden. The decoration is awarded in gold, silver, and bronze. The Austrian Sports Badge can also awarded to juveniles and to disabled persons with special requirements.

== Requirements ==
Requirements vary according to age, gender, and the class.

Group	Section	Disciplines
1	Swimming	200 or 300 meters swimming, consecutive swim
2	Jumping power	High jump, long jump, pommel horse, leapfrog
3	Speed	60/100/400 meter run
4	Physical strength	Stone put or shot-put
5	Endurance	2.000/5.000 meters run, 10/20 kilometers march, 10/20 kilometers bicycling, 10/15 kilometers cross-country skiing

== The badge ==
There is a basic (Grundstufe) and an advanced (Leistungsstufe) badge depending on the physical fitness of the participant. The age classes are separated in three divisions that are denoted by the Olympic noble metals:

- Bronze: age 18–29
- Silver: age 30–39
- Gold: age 40 and above

For youth (age 13–18) there are only three classes; Bronze, Silver and Gold. The level of the badge is calculated with both age, gender and level of physical fitness.

Upon successful completion of the requirements, a certificate and the badge as cloth patch are awarded. Receiving the award as a metal badge is optional. Depending on regulations, the badge may be worn on uniforms.

Repetitive completions of the award are indicated by numbers (5, 10, 15, 20, etc.) on the award.

== Ribbon bars ==
An official Austrian ribbon for the badge does not exist.

Level	Gold	Silver	Bronze
Youth			
Basic			
Advanced			

== See also ==
- German Sports Badge

== Links ==
- http://www.oesta.at/de (in German)
