= German Life Saving Association =

Relief organization for life saving in Germany

- Deutsche Lebens-Rettungs-Gesellschaft
- Abbreviation: DLRG
- Formation: October 19, 1913; 113 years ago
- Founded at: Leipzig, Deutschland
- Type: NGO
- Legal status: Registered
- Headquarters: Bad Nenndorf, Germany
- Region served: Germany
- Members: 551,664 (2020)
- Official language: German
- Key people: Ute Vogt (President)
- Parent organization: International Life Saving Federation
- Website: www.dlrg.de

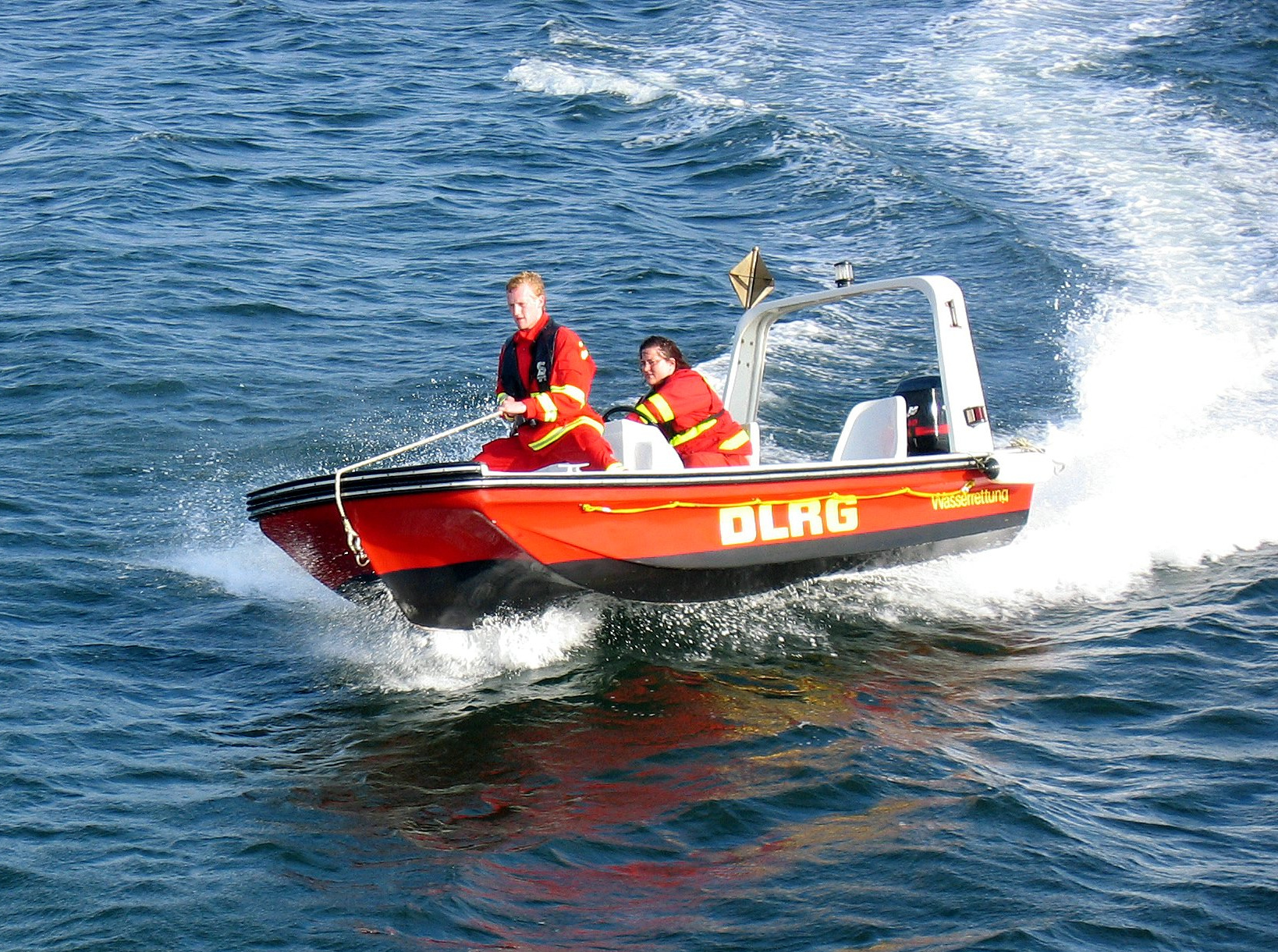
Rescue boat of the DLRG

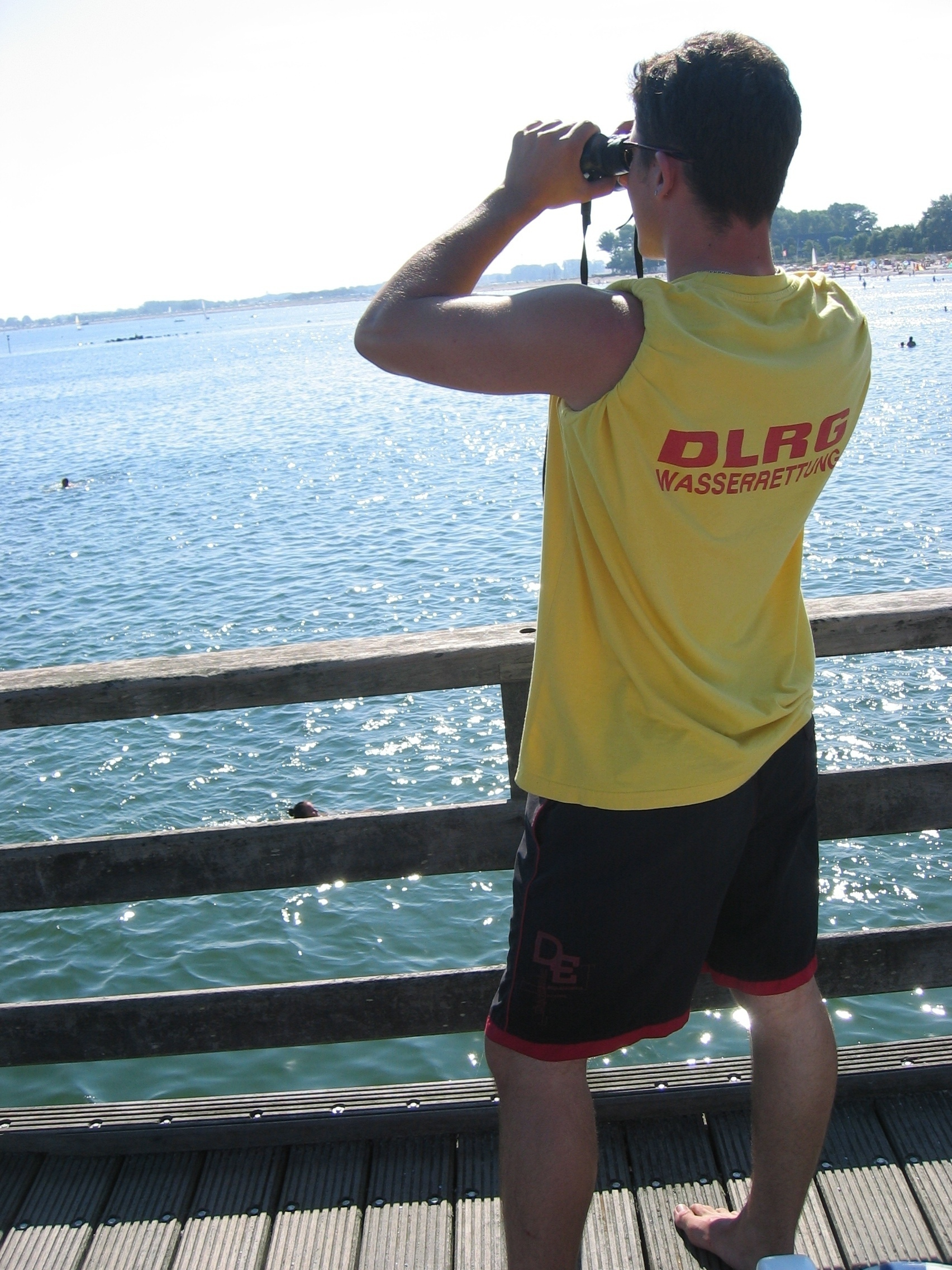
A German lifeguard

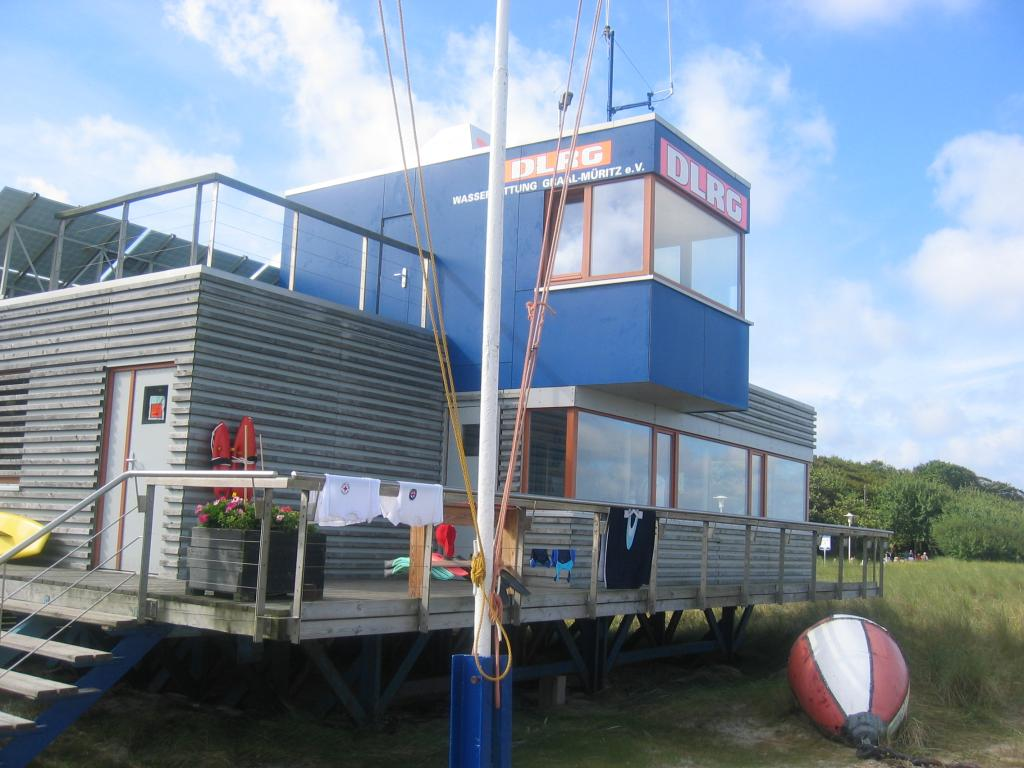
A rescue station of the DLRG

The German Life Saving Association (German: Deutsche Lebens-Rettungs-Gesellschaft or DLRG) is a relief organization for life saving in Germany. The DLRG is the largest voluntary lifesaving organization in the world.

With around 560,000 members, organised in approximately 2,100 local groups, the DLRG is the largest voluntary water rescue organization in the world. More than one million regular donors support the work of the DLRG.

This organization is not to be confused with the German Sea Rescue Society (DGzRS), which operates in North Sea and Baltic Sea after maritime incidents.

== Tasks ==
The most urgent goal of the DLRG is the creation and promotion of all activities used to fight drowning. Additional tasks are:

- Teach swimming and self-rescue to the public
- Educate people about the dangers of swimming and how to avoid them
- Teach and train rescue swimming
- Basic and advanced training in First Aid
- Help and technical safety support for water related activities
- Providing lifeguards at public places
- Perform rescue related exercises and water sports competitions
- Environmental protection at, on and in waters.
- Cooperation with German civil defense, especially concerning floods.
- International Response Units
- International Operations (Lifeguards in Spain are often trained by DLRG members)

== Qualifications ==
The DLRG trains interested members as qualified technical personnel in the following ranges:

- Swimming
- First aid / Advanced First aid
- Boating
- Rescue diver
- Swift water rescue
- Radio and Communication Systems

== History ==
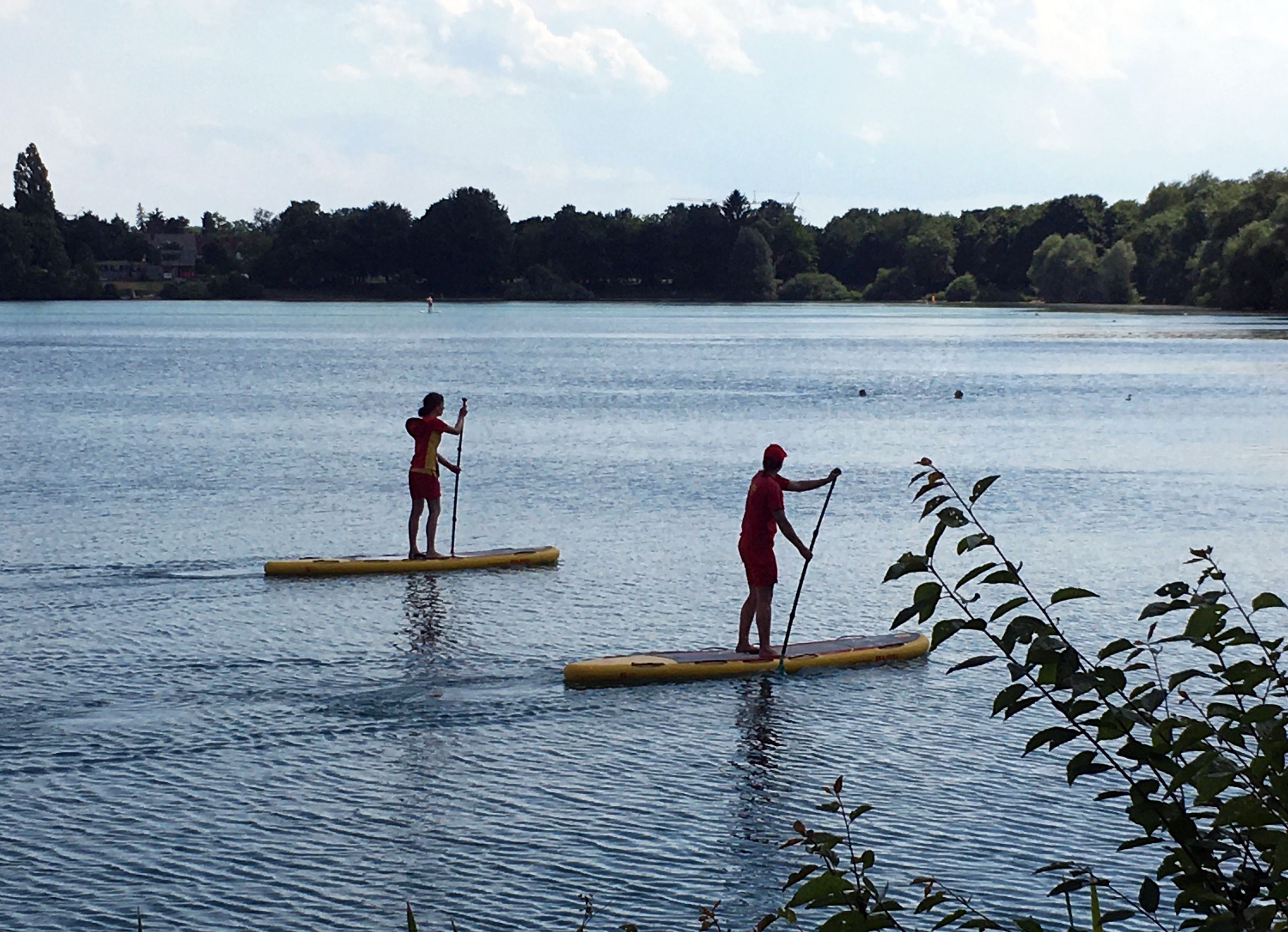
Two uniformed lifeguards of the DLRG routinely patrolling a public bathing area of a lake in Munich using stand-up paddleboards in summer 2022

On 28 July 1912, a pier in Binz on the island Rügen, Germany, collapsed under the load of 1,000 people waiting for the cruise steamer Kronprinz Wilhelm. Sailors of the German navy were able to save most people, but 16 people died because they could not swim, including two children. This catastrophe led to the foundation of the "Deutsche Lebens-Rettungs-Gesellschaft (DLRG)" (German lifesaving association) on 19 October 1913 in Leipzig.

== See also ==
- Wasserwacht
- Lifeguard
- German rescue swimming badge
