= Rescue swimming =

Water safety skill

Rescue swimming is the body of skills that enable an individual to attempt a rescue when a swimmer is in difficulty. These include a combination of communication skills, specific "rescue" swimming strokes, and release and evade techniques for self-preservation should the rescue go wrong.

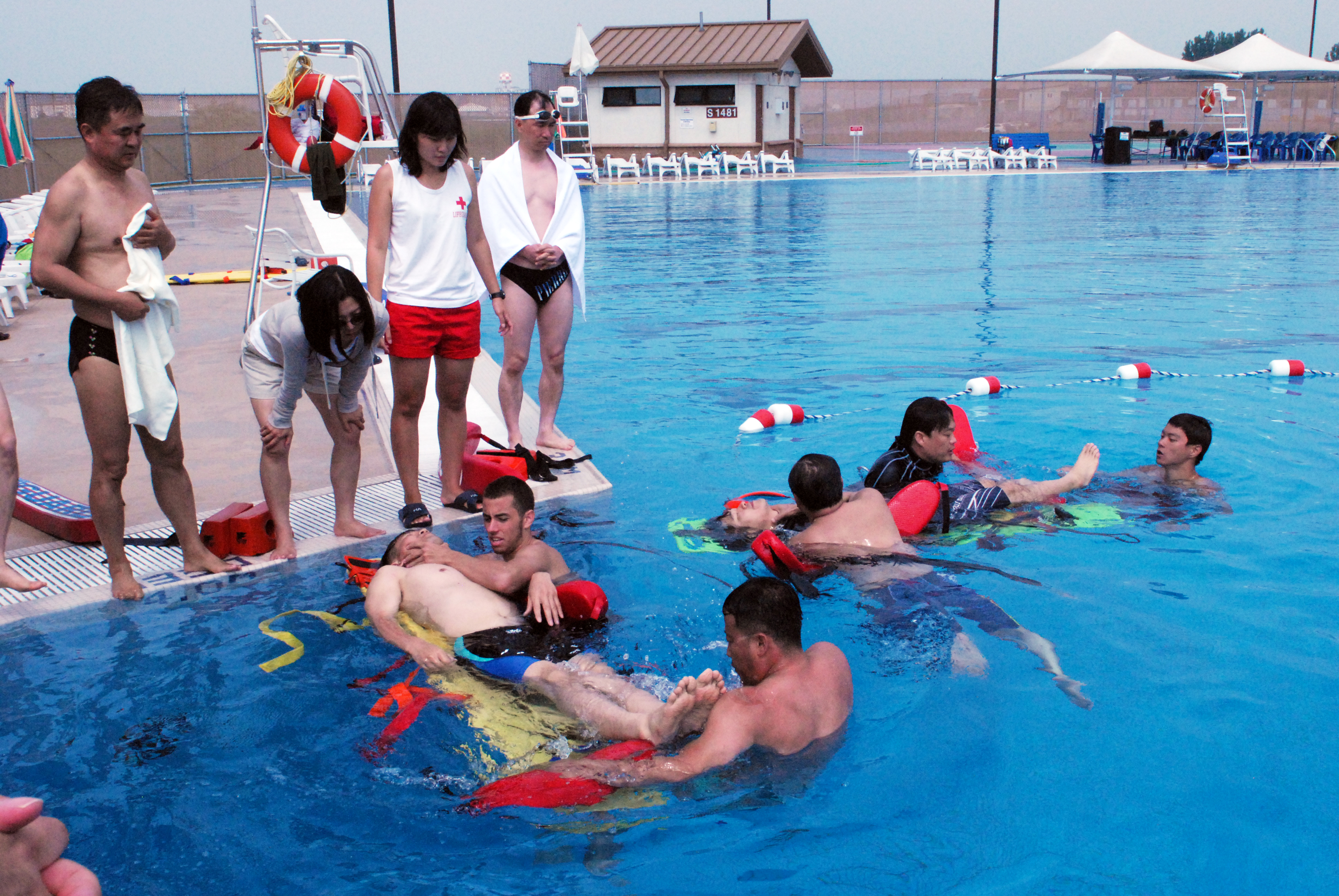
American Korean Red Cross Lifeguards train for the times. In this photo, one American and 19 Korean lifeguards from throughout the peninsula practice deep water spinal injury rescue procedures.

- From the outset once a swimmer in difficulty is spotted, eye contact must be maintained at all times.
- Assess the situation: environment, available physical equipment, others who can help, etc.
- Attempt to establish voice contact, which if successful can often result in a "voice-rescue".
- A rescuer should enter the water only as a last resort.
- Rescues should be attempted in the following order: talk, throw, reach, wade, row, swim, tow and carry.

There are four main rescue strokes: front crawl, breaststroke, inverted breaststroke, and sidestroke.

== See also ==
- Swiftwater rescue
