= German rescue swimming badge =

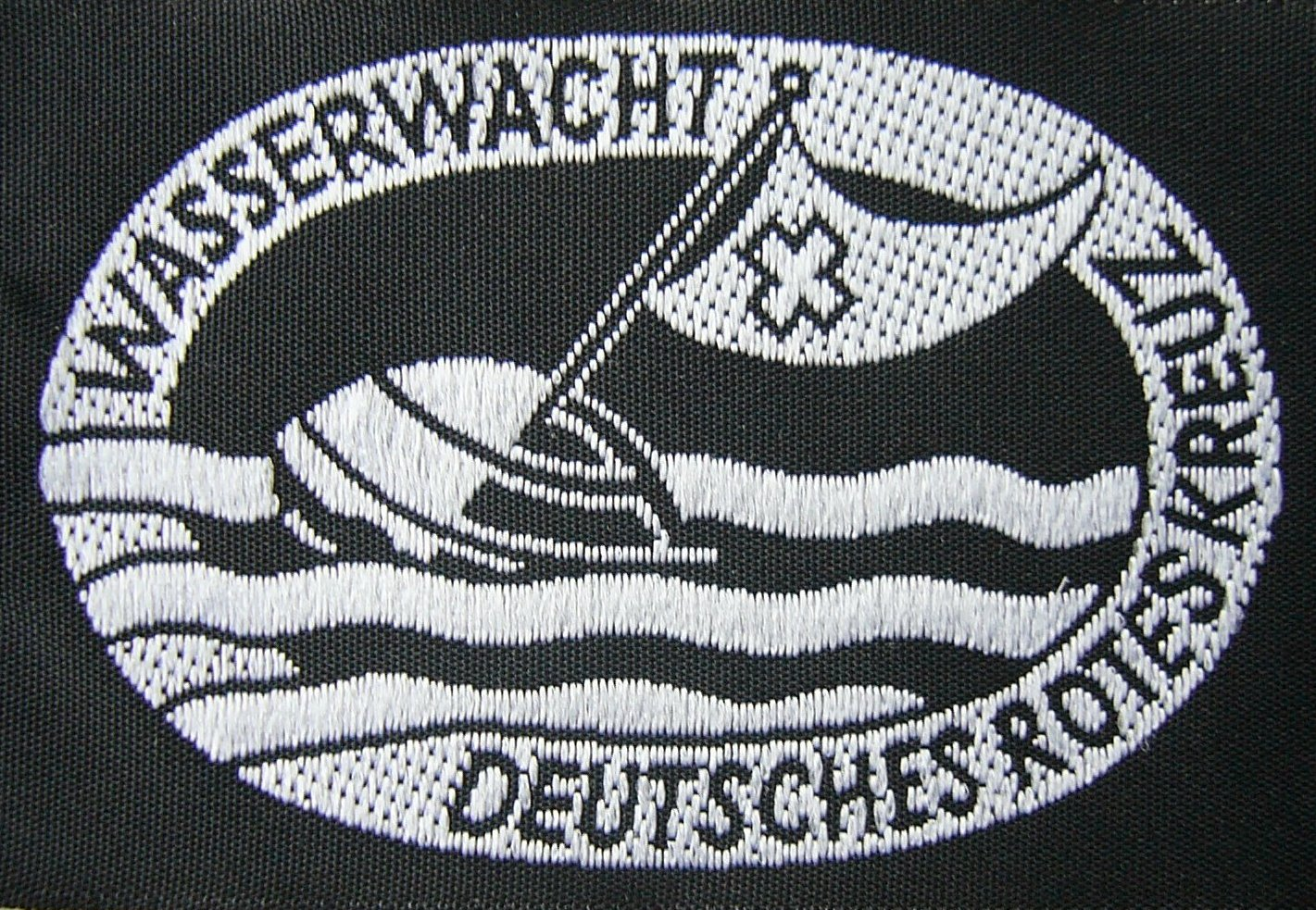
- German rescue swimming badge in silver as a cloth badge as awarded by the Wasserwacht
- Type: Badge & Ribbon
- Awarded for: Proficiency in rescue swimming skills
- Description: Awarded in three classes: gold, silver and bronze
- Presented by: German Red Cross (Wasserwacht) or DLRG
- Eligibility: Civilians, members of the military, police, or rescue services
- Status: Currently awarded
- Established: 1913
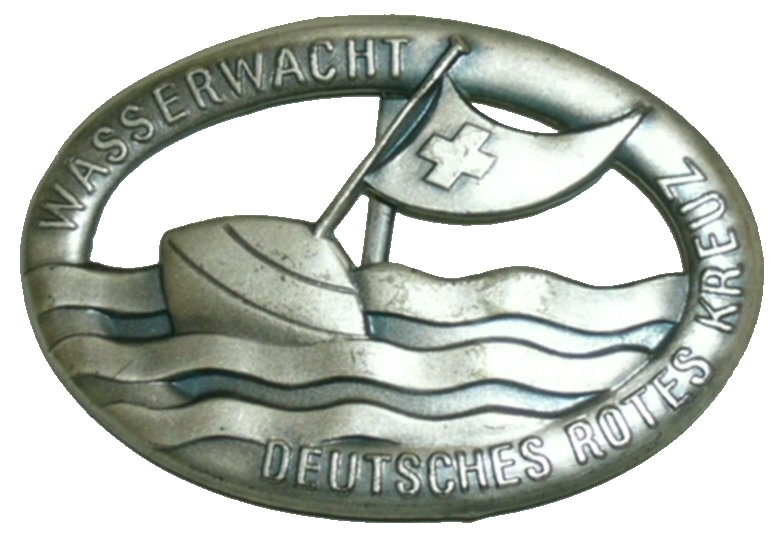
- Silver swimming badge as a metal badge

The German rescue swimming badge (German: Deutsches Rettungsschwimmabzeichen) is awarded by the Wasserwacht of the German Red Cross, the DLRG and the ASB for proficiency in rescue swimming skills. The German rescue swimming badge is awarded in bronze, silver, and in gold. The award is available as a cloth patch, as a metal badge, or as a ribbon. The rescue swimming badges in silver and gold are permitted to be worn on uniforms of the Bundeswehr, the German Police and various rescue services as a ribbon. It is also an entry-requirement for some German Police agencies.

== History ==
In 1913 the DLRG offered its first rescue swimming classes. By the year 1922, 7997 rescue swimming certificates, 2038 badges in bronze, and 676 instructors' certificates were awarded.

== Bronze ==
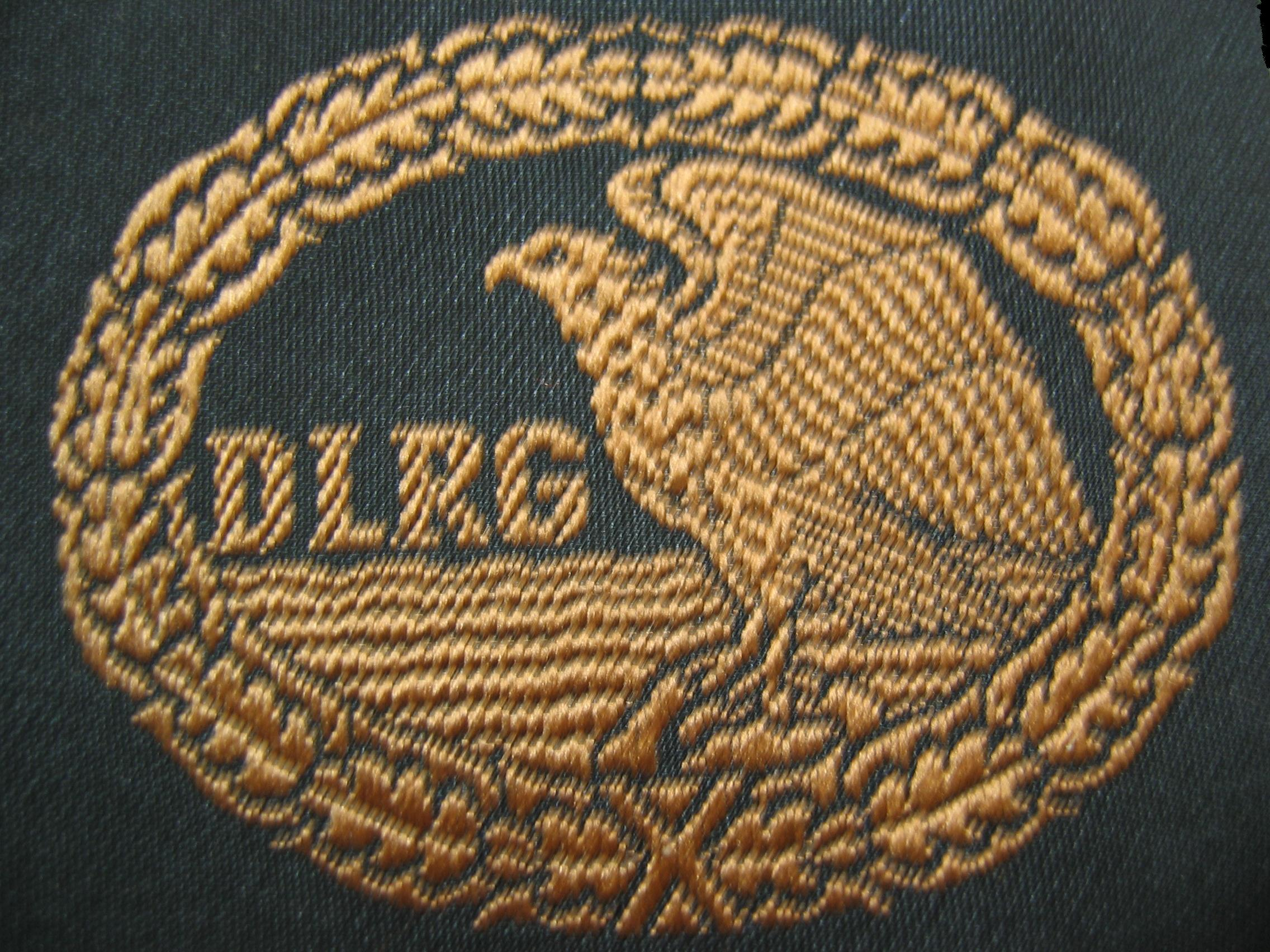
German rescue swimming badge in bronze as awarded by the DLRG

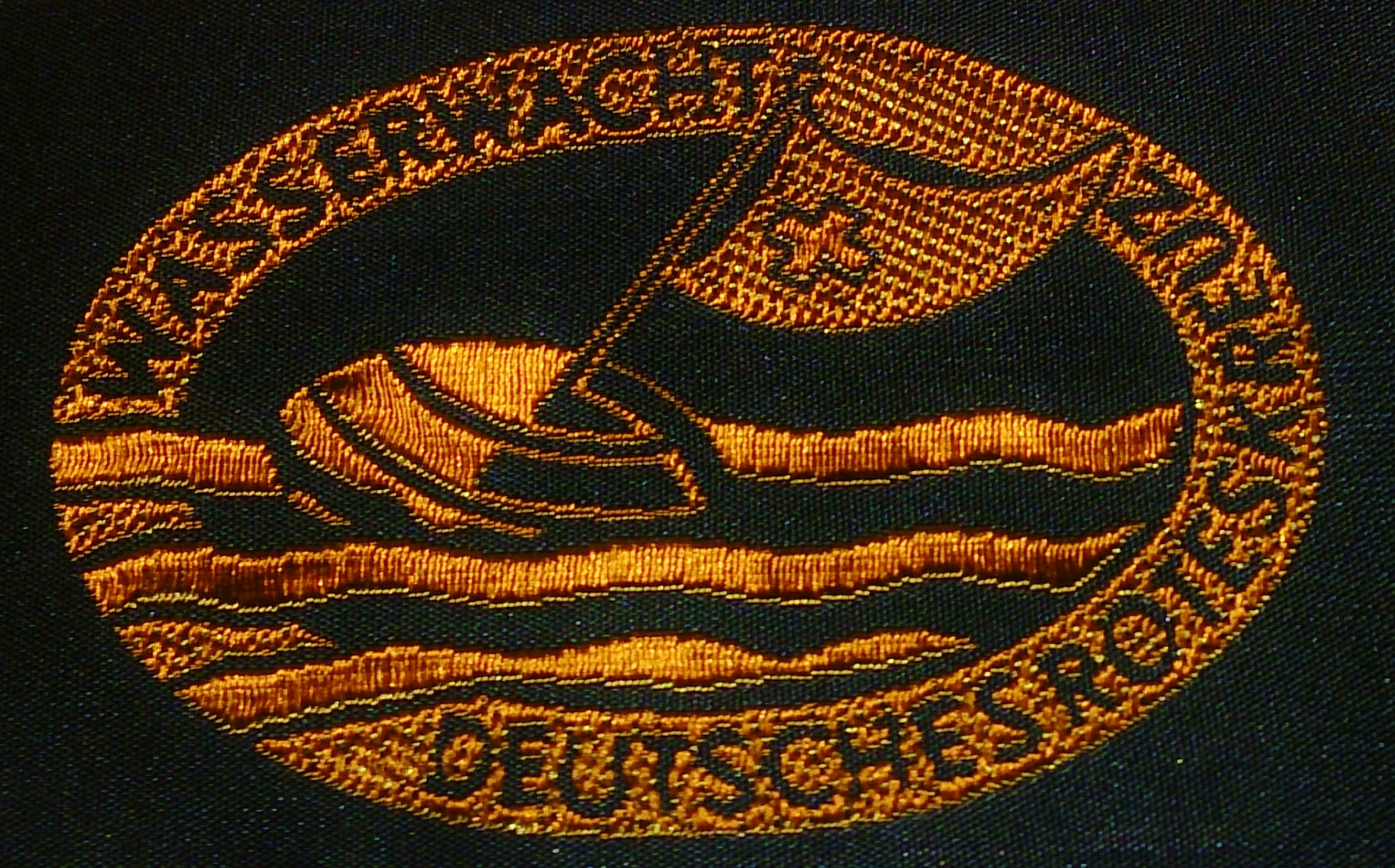
German rescue swimming badge in bronze as awarded by the Wasserwacht of the German Red Cross

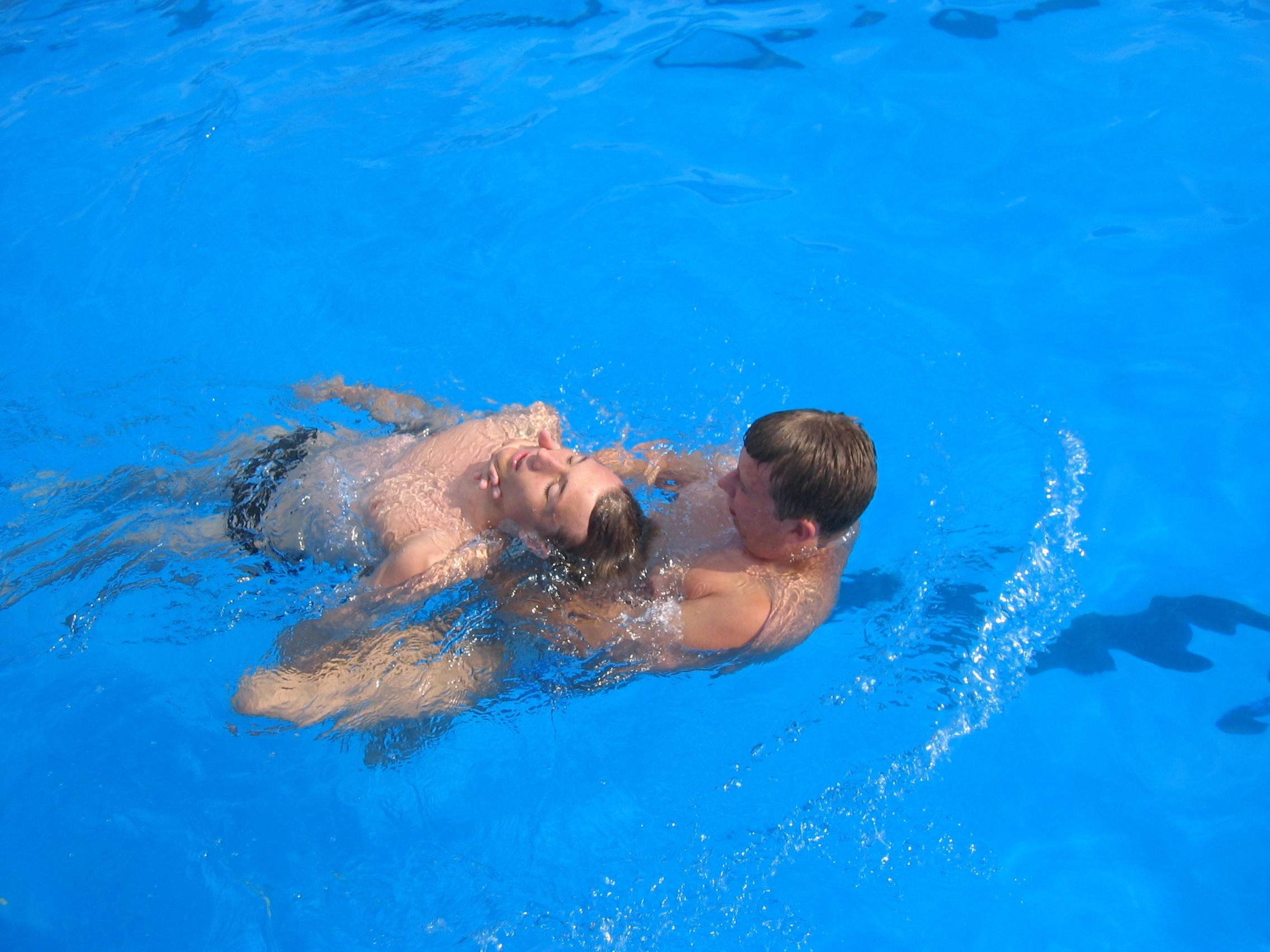
Rescue swimmer applying the pulling stroke.

Requirements

- At least 12 years old

Test

- 200 metres swim in less than 10 minutes, (100 m breaststroke and 100 m on the back without arm activity)
- 100 metres swim in clothing in less than 4 minutes. Afterwards, taking off clothes in the water.
- Three different jumps from springboard of 1 metre height
- 15 metres underwater swim on one breath
- Two 2–3 metres dives and retrieving a 5 kilo ring
- 50 metres rescue pulling or pushing stroke
- 50 metres lifesaving stroke
- Demonstrating proficiency in avoiding holds and chokes
- Demonstration of CPR
- Lifting a person out of the water
- Combination of:
  - 20 metre swim
  - Diving and retrieving a 5 kilo ring
  - 20 metres rescue pulling stroke
- Demonstrating proficiency in (written test):
  - Hazards near and inside water
  - Respiratory and cardiovascular system
  - Rescue for boat accidents or ice accidents
  - First aid for near-drowning accidents
  - Duties and responsibilities

== Silver ==
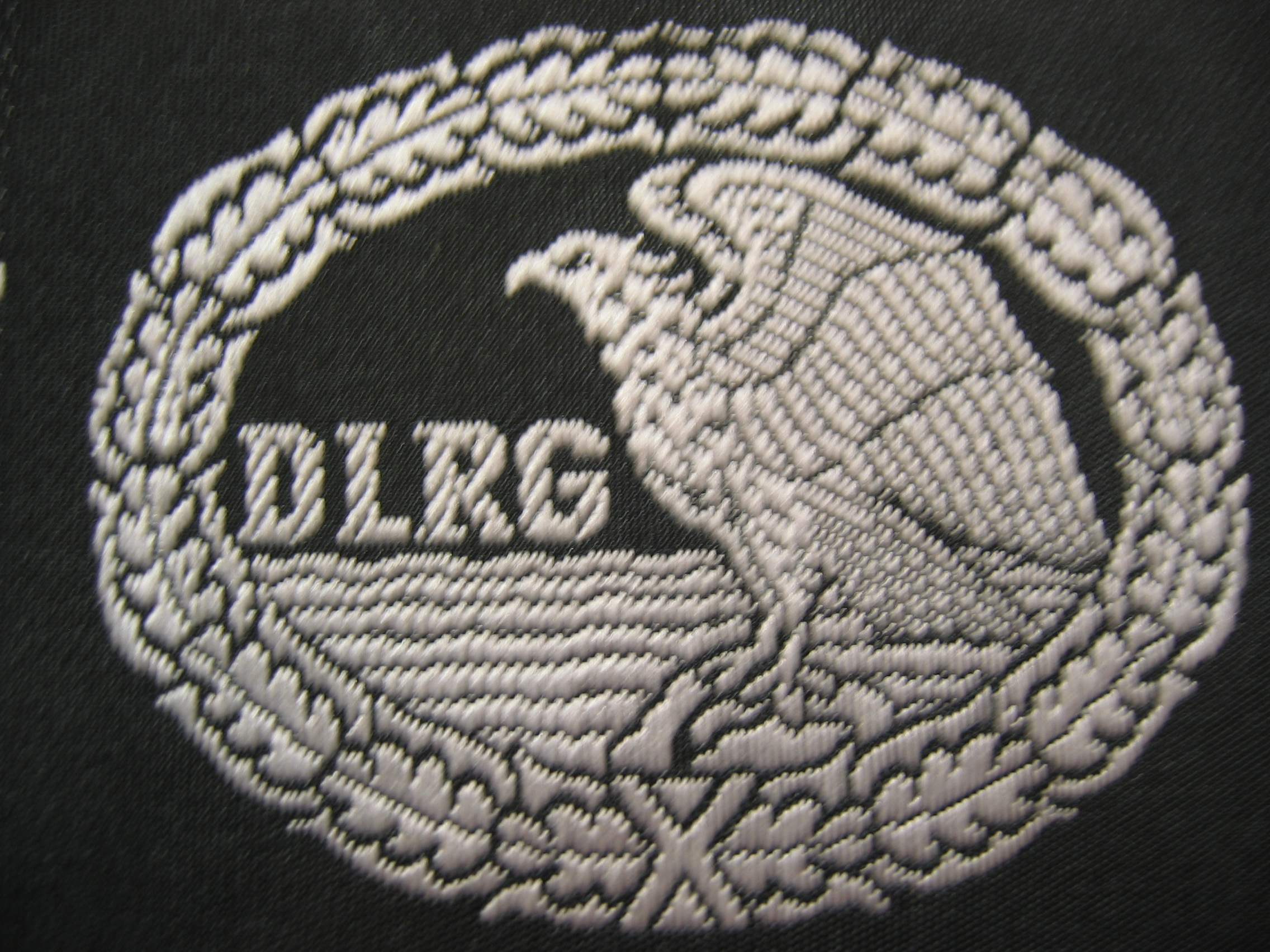
Rescue swimming badge in silver as awarded by the DLRG

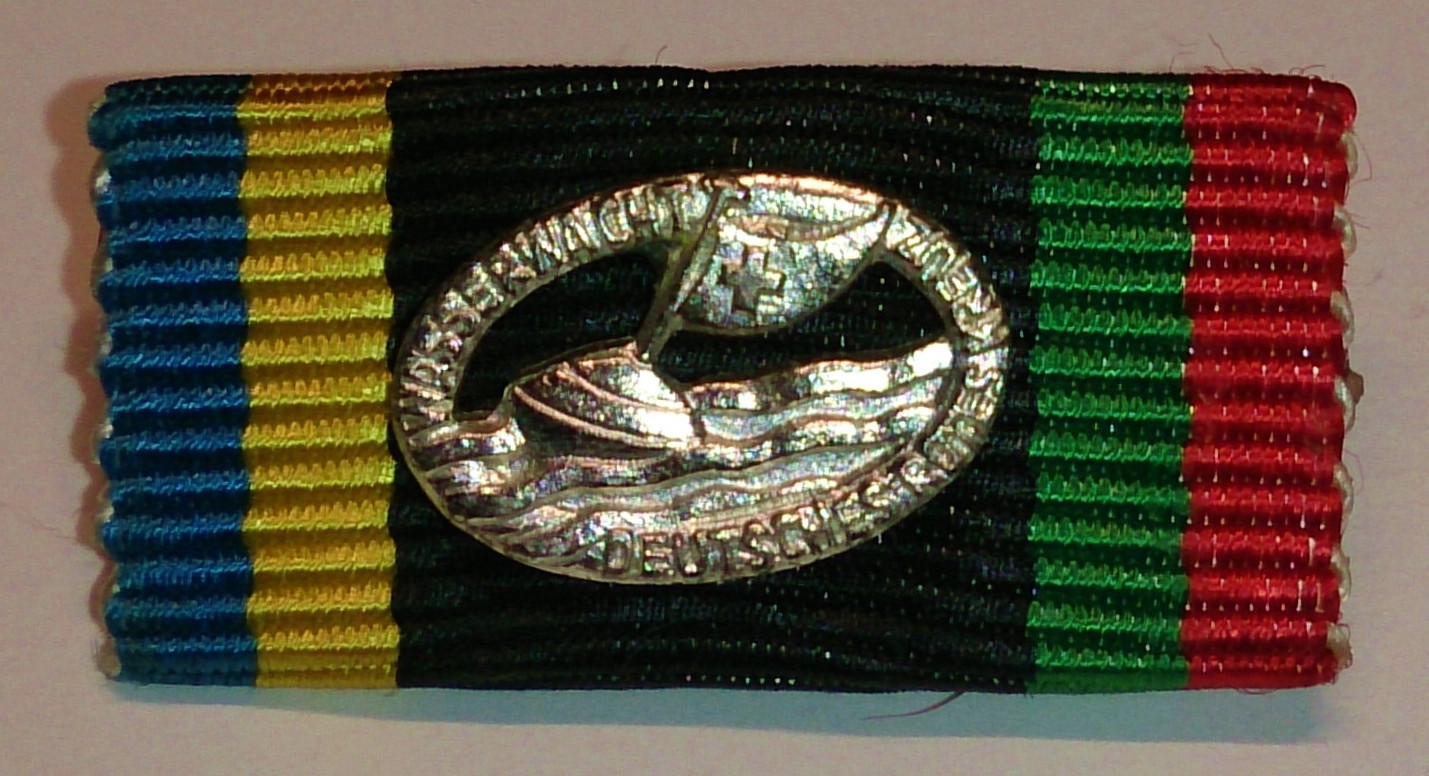
German rescue swimming ribbon in silver as awarded by the Wasserwacht of the German Red Cross

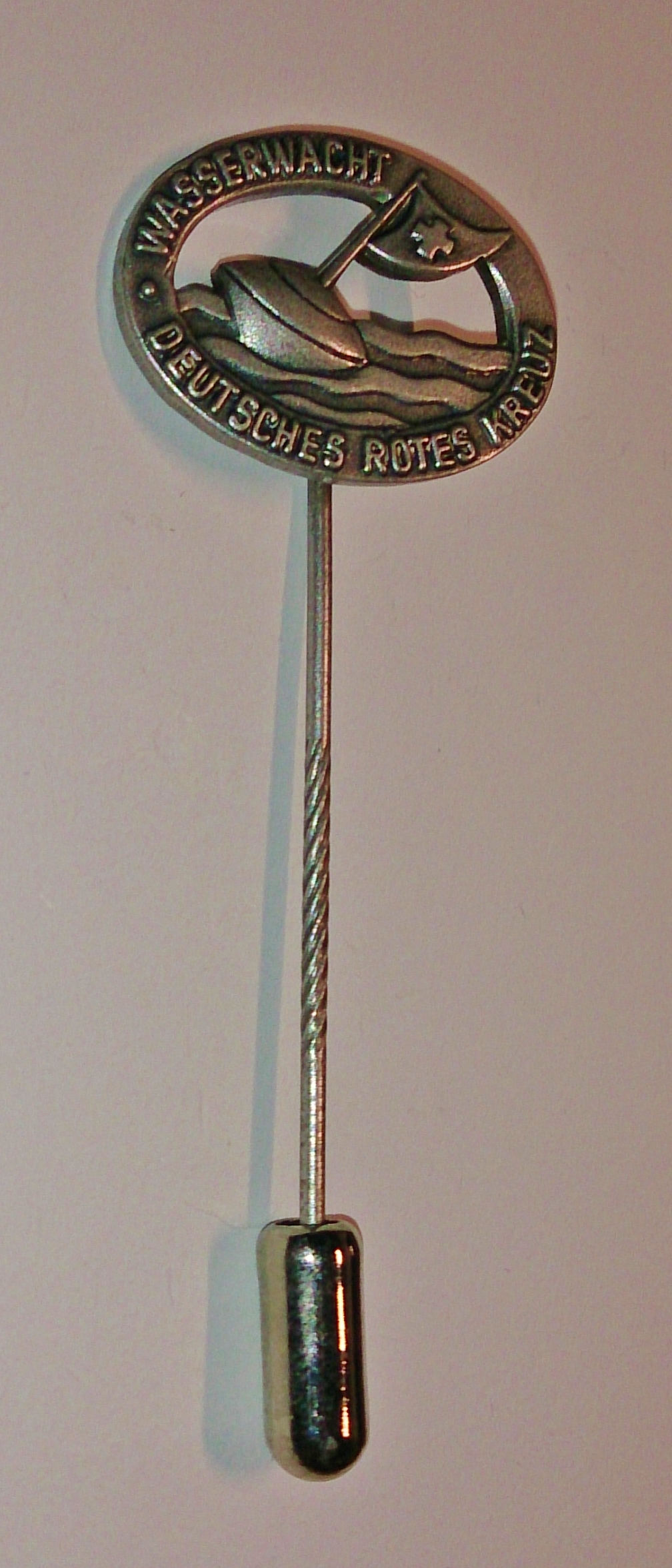
German rescue swimming lapel pin in silver as awarded by the Wasserwacht of the German Red Cross

Requirements

- At least 14 years old
- Completion of First-Aid course

Test

- 400 metres swim (50 metres front crawl, 150 metres breaststroke, 200 metres pulling rescue stroke) in less than 15 minutes
- 300 metres swim in clothing in less than 12 minutes. Afterwards, taking off clothes in the water.
- 25 metres underwater swim on one breath
- Jump from springboard of 3 metres height
- Three 3–5 metres dives and retrieving a 5 kilo ring or a similar object
- 50 metres rescue pushing stroke in 1:30 minutes
- Demonstrating proficiency in avoiding holds and chokes
- 50 metres rescue pulling stroke in less than 4 minutes, both persons wearing clothes
- Combination of:
  - 20 metres swim
  - Diving and retrieving a 5 kg ring in 3–5 metres depth
  - Breaking a hold or choke
  - Transporting a person 25 metres by using rescue pulling stroke
  - Lifting a person out of the water
  - Demonstrating CPR for three minutes
- Demonstrating proficiency in (written test):
  - Hazards near and inside water
  - Respiratory and cardiovascular system
  - Rescue for boat accidents or ice accidents
  - First aid for near-drowning accidents
  - Duties and responsibilities
  - Using rescue devices
  - Duties and tasks of the lifeguard organization

== Gold ==
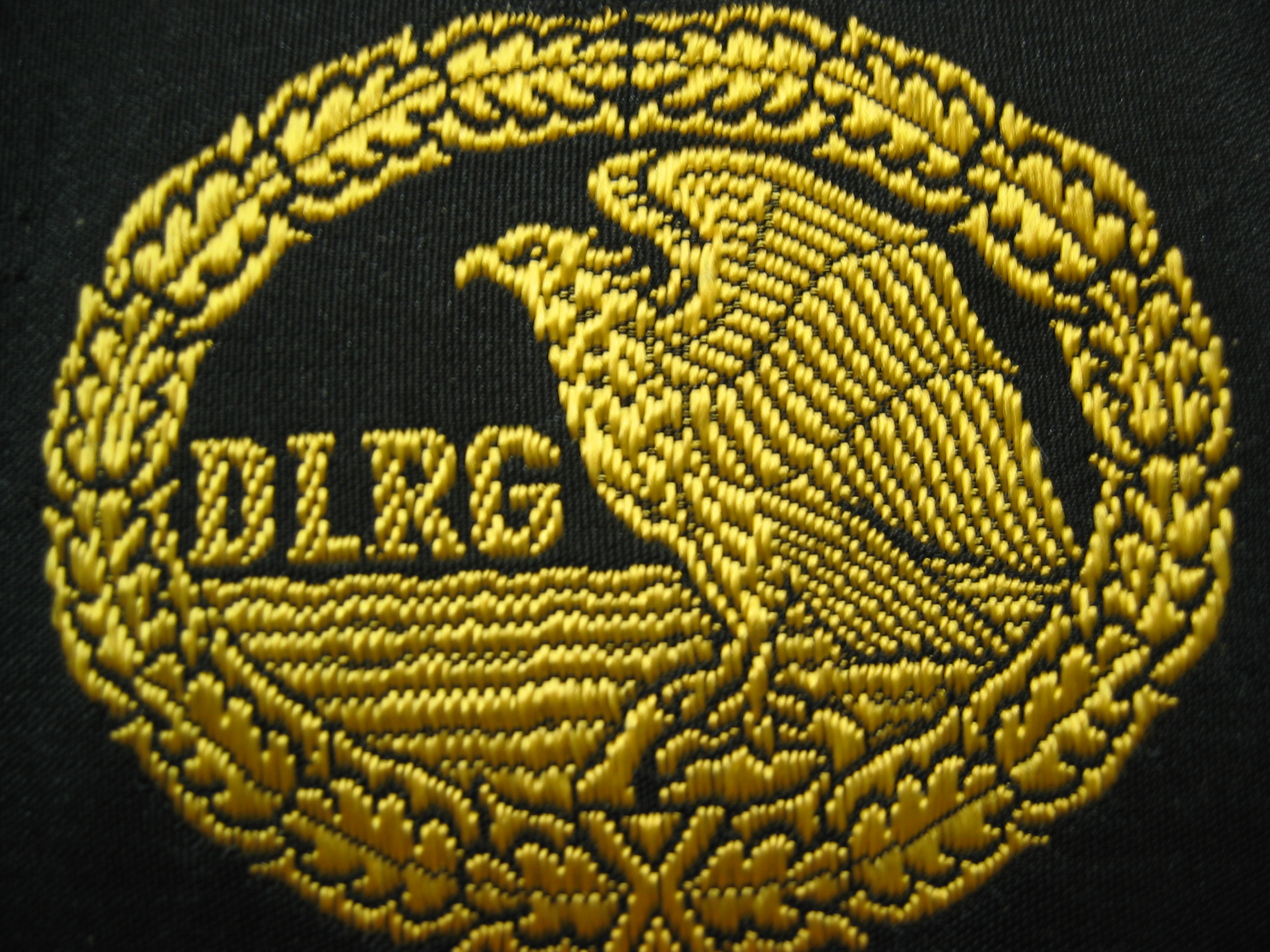
Rescue swimming badge in gold as awarded by the DLRG

Requirements

- At least 16 years old
- Completion of First-Aid course
- Completion of rescue swimming badge in silver
- Medical certificate of physical fitness (according to DLRG template # 15401353)

Test

- 300 metres swim with swim fins in less than 6 minutes (250 metres swim in breaststroke or sidestroke, 50 metres pulling a partner wearing clothes with a hold on his head and axillary)
- 300 metres swim wearing clothes in less than 9 minutes. Afterwards, taking off clothes in water.
- 100 metres swim in less than 1:40 minutes
- 30 metres underwater swim on one breath while picking up at least 8 out of 10 rings from the ground across 20m within a variation of 2 m
- Three 3–5 metres dives wearing clothes and retrieving two 5 kilo rings or similar objects with 3 m in between in less than 3 minutes. The first time with a dive start. The second and third time from the water level, with a dive head first and a dive feet first.
- 50 metres rescue pulling or pushing stroke with a partner in less than 1:30 minutes (both wearing clothes).
- Demonstrating proficiency in avoiding and breaking holds and chokes
- Combination of:
  - 25 metres swim in less than 30 seconds
  - Diving and retrieving a 5 kg ring in 3–5 metres depth
  - Breaking a hold or choke
  - Transport person 25 metres by using rescue pulling stroke in less than 60 seconds
  - Lifting person out of the water
  - Demonstrating CPR for three minutes
- Demonstrating proficiency in using rescue aids:
  - How to use a throw bag with rope
  - How to use a throw ball with rope (very similar to a throw bag)
  - Devices for CPR

Exam

- Demonstrating proficiency in (written test):
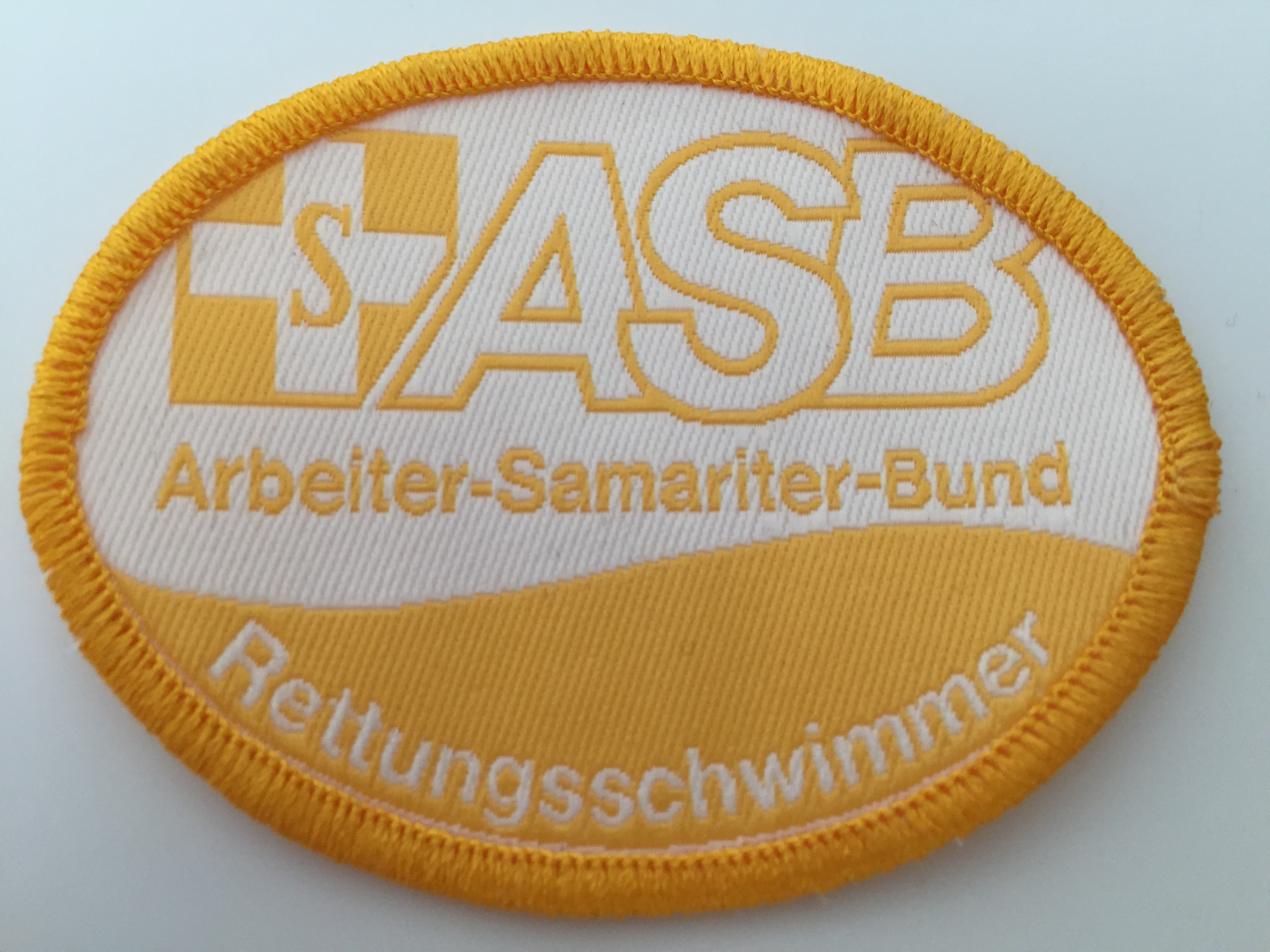
  Rescue swimming badge in gold as awarded by the ASB
  - Methods of cardiopulmonary resuscitation
  - Avoiding holds and chokes
  - First aid
  - Duties and tasks of the lifeguard organization (DLRG)

== See also ==
- German Sports Badge
