= Carsten Breuer =

German Army general (born 1964)

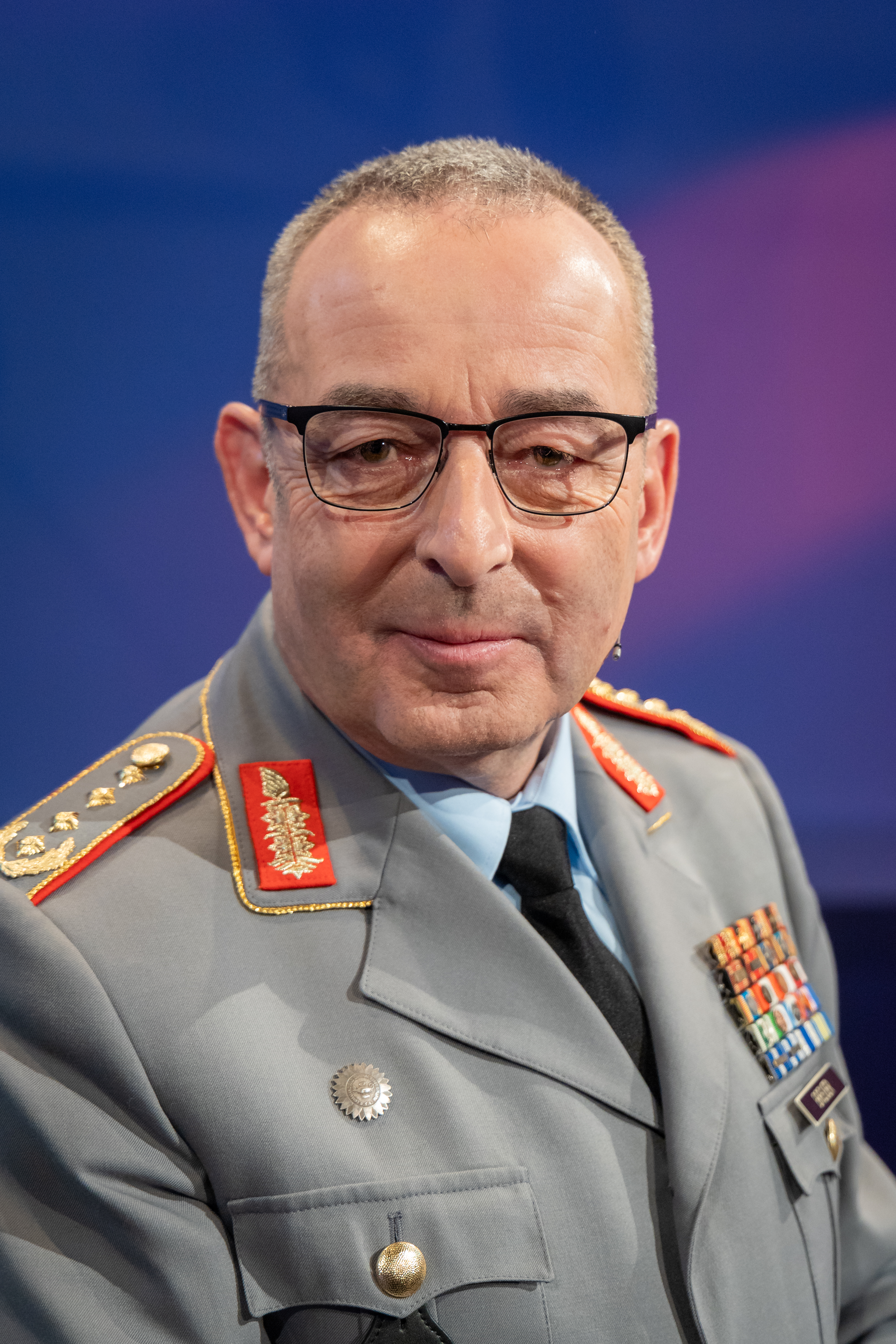
- Breuer in 2024
- Born: Carsten Breuer; December 1, 1964 (age 61); Letmathe, North Rhine-Westphalia, West Germany
- Education: Helmut Schmidt University (BS)
- Military career
- Allegiance: West Germany (to 1990); Germany
- Branch: German Army
- Service years: 1984–present
- Rank: General
- Commands: Inspector General of the Bundeswehr; Bundeswehr Homeland Defence Command; COVID-19 Task Force; Kommando Territoriale Aufgaben der Bundeswehr; 37th Panzergrenadier Brigade; 12 Armoured Air Defence Gun Battalion; 4th Battery, 6 Armoured Air Defence Gun Demonstration Battalion
- Conflicts: Kosovo War (KFOR); War in Afghanistan (ISAF)
- Awards: Order of Merit of the Federal Republic of Germany; Armed Forces Deployment Medal (KFOR & ISAF); NATO Medal (KFOR); NATO Non-Article 5 medal (ISAF)

Carsten Breuer (born 1 December 1964) is a German Army general serving as the 17th and current Chief of Defence of the Bundeswehr. He is the elected head of NATO-military committee serving up from summer 2027. Prior to his appointment to the post, Breuer served as the first commander of the Bundeswehr Homeland Defence Command and is also known for his role as commander of the COVID-19 Task Force. Breuer also served as commander of the Budeswehr Territorial Command, the 37 Armoured Infantry Brigade and the 12 Armoured Air Defence Gun Battalion.

== Early life and education ==
Breuer was born in Letmathe, a small suburb located at North Rhine-Westphalia on 1 December 1964. In 1984, upon graduating high school, Breuer entered the Bundeswehr under the 11th Air Defense Regiment (Flugabwehrregiment 11) in Achim and later moved to the Army Air Defence Training Centre in Rendsburg to complete the officer candidate school from 1984 to 1985. After completing his course, Breuer was transferred to the Helmut Schmidt University to finish his education and graduated in 1988 with a degree in educational theory. Breuer later finished the General Staff Officer Course at the Bundeswehr Command and Staff College 1995 to 1997 and the US Command and General Staff Officers’ Course at the United States Army Command and General Staff College in Fort Leavenworth, Kansas in the United States from 2001 to 2002.

== Military career ==
Breuer started his career in 1989 where he served as an Assistant to Division Commander for military intelligence operations under the 10 Air Defence Regiment and as an adjutant to the Division Commander under the 10th Armoured Division, both based in Sigmaringen from 1989 to 1992. From 1992 to 1995, Breuer was named as commander 4th Battery, 6 Armoured Air Defence Gun Demonstration Battalion in Lütjenburg, before serving as a branch instructor under the Army Air Defence, Armour School in Munster from 1995 to 1997.

From 1997 to 1999, Breuer later served as a Staff Officer to the Vice Chief of Defence in Berlin, before serving as the Chief of Staff for the 41 Armoured Infantry Brigade from 2002 to 2004 and later served as a contingent commander of German units as part of the Multinational Brigade South-West of the 8th KFOR Contingent in Prizren, Kosovo. Breuer later became commander of the 12 Armoured Air Defence Gun Battalion from 2004 to 2006 and later served as an assistant to Chief of the Army at the Federal Ministry of Defence in Bonn from 2006 to 2008. In 2008 to 2010, Breuer later served as the Deputy Supreme Allied Commander Transformation Representative in Europe (SACTREPEUR) at the NATO headquarters in Brussels, Belgium. Breuer was also posted as Branch Chief for Military-Strategic Fundamentals under the Armed Forces Staff from 2010 to 2011, before subsequently serving as the Branch Chief for Military Policy Concepts and Bilateral Relations and in Fundamentals of Security Policy and Bilateral Relations at the Federal Ministry of Defence in Berlin from 2012 to 2013.

Breuer later served as commander of the 37th Panzergrenadier Brigade from 2013 to 2014 before being named as Chief of Division I, Directorate-General for Security and Defence Policy in 2014. Breuer also served as Project Manager for the creation of the 2016 White Paper on German Security Policy and the Future of the Bundeswehr. Breuer later served as Deputy Chief of Staff, Operations/Military Intelligence/Training Directorate in 2016 to 2017 before being named as the commander of the Kommando Territoriale Aufgaben der Bundeswehr from 2018 to 2021. Breuer later served as commander of the government's COVID-19 Task Force tasked at combatting the spread of the COVID-19 virus, which serves as the primary part of the country's response to the COVID-19 pandemic.

In October 2022, amidst the creation of the Bundeswehr Homeland Defence Command, Breuer was named as the command's first commander. During his stint, Breuer was tasked to highlight the importance of strengthening the country's operational readiness in times of war, amidst the risks posed by the Russian invasion of Ukraine.

=== Inspector General of the Bundeswehr ===
Flag of the Inspector General of the Bundeswehr, the highest-ranking military position in Germany.

Breuer was named as the new Chief of Defence of the Bundeswehr (Inspector General) on 13 March 2023 and replaced General Eberhard Zorn, who was placed under early retirement. The move came due to reported disagreements on Zorn's assessment to the War in Ukraine by government officials including the Minister of Defense Boris Pistorius, wherein Zorn commented on Ukraine's inability to launch a counterattack on Russian positions in Ukraine. Zorn's comments came under criticism from various officials, including former US officials and commanders. Breuer was also eventually promoted to the rank of General. On 8 February 2024, General Breuer, alongside Major General Christian Freuding and other key officials, visited Kyiv in Ukraine and met the then Commander-in-Chief of the Armed Forces of Ukraine General Valerii Zaluzhnyi and talked about the importance of defence cooperation and exchanges of ideas between the two countries. On 18 April 2024, in the aftermath of the NATO meeting in Poland regarding the situation in Ukraine, Breuer called for preparations for the next 5 to 8 years due to potential Russian attacks on NATO countries. The calls were made based on their analysis and stated that an attack "is possible" as Russia continues to build its military muscle amidst its invasion of Ukraine.

In April 2026 Breuer signed the first Military Strategy of the Bundeswehr.

In September 2026 Breuer get elected to chair of NATO Military Committee succeeding italian Admiral Giuseppe Cavo Dragone in summer 2027. On 5 November 2026 the Ministry of defence announced Carsten Breuer will be succeeded as Generalinspekteur by Christian Freuding in February 2027.

== Dates of promotion ==
Insignia	Rank	Date
	Second Lieutenant	1984
	Brigadier General	1 January 2013
	Major General	1 July 2016
	Lieutenant General	27 September 2022
	General	17 March 2023

== Awards from military service ==
- Officer, Order of Merit of the Federal Republic of Germany
- Gold Cross of Honour
- Silver Cross of Honour
- Bronze Cross of Honour
- Armed Forces Deployment Medal (KFOR)
- Armed Forces Deployment Medal (ISAF)
- 2002 Flood Service Medal
- 2013 Flood Service Medal
- 2021 Flood Service Medal
- Brandenburg Oderflut Flood Protection Medal (1997)
- Elbe Flood Medal (2002)
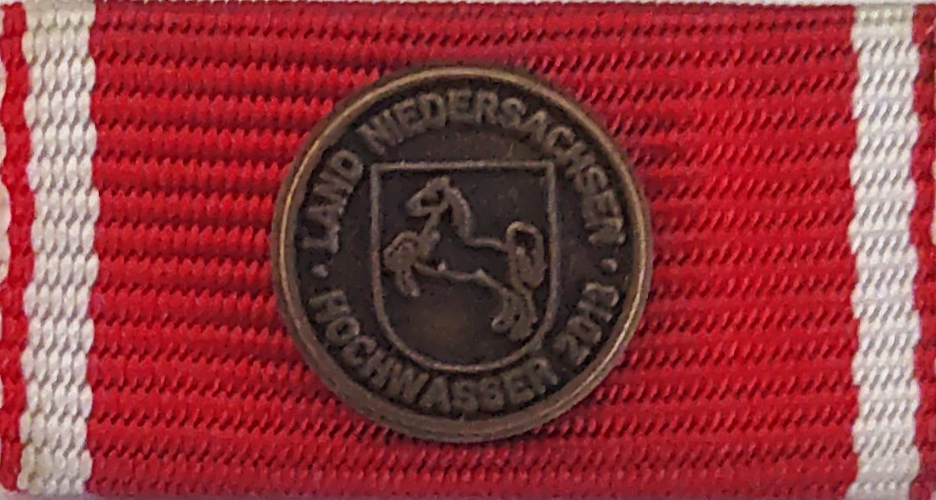
- Flood-Medal 2013 of the State of Lower Saxony
- Saxony Flood Assistance Medal (2013)
- Saxony Forest Fire Service Medal (2022)
- Brandenburg Forest Fire Service Medal (2022)
- Lübtheen Mecklenburg-Western Pomerania Forest Fire Service Medal (2019)
- Commemorative Medal of the Chief of the General Staff of the Slovak Armed Forces, 1st Degree
- Badge of Honour For Merits to the Czech Army, 1st Degree (2026)
- NATO Medal Non-Article 5 medal for ISAF
- NATO Medal for Kosovo
- NATO Meritorious Service Medal
- US Army Command and General Staff College International Graduate Badge

== Personal life ==
Breuer is married and has three children.
