= 26th Airborne Brigade =

Coordinates: 49.313331°N 6.734254°E

26th (Saarland) Airborne Brigade
- Luftlandebrigade 26 "Saarland"
- Formation sign of 26th (Saarland) Airborne Brigade
- Active: 1958–2015
- Country: Germany
- Allegiance: Bundeswehr
- Branch: German Army
- Type: Intervention force brigade
- Size: ~ 3500
- Part of: Special Operations Division
- Headquarters: Saarlouis
- Nickname: Saarlandbrigade
- Engagements: Somalian Civil War; Bosnian Civil War; Kosovo War; Afghanistan War: Operation Harekate Yolo I; Operation Oqab

Commanders
- Commander: Brigadegeneral Eberhard Zorn

26th (Saarland) Airborne Brigade (German: Luftlandebrigade 26 "Saarland") was a formation in the Special Operations Division of the German Army with a strength of about 3,500 men and its brigade headquarters in Saarlouis. The Brigade was also called the Saarland Brigade as almost all its troops were stationed in the federal state of Saarland. Other elements are based in Rhineland-Palatinate. Most of the 26th Airborne Brigade belonged to the intervention forces of the Bundeswehr, and the formation therefore provided an overwhelming proportion of paratroopers and airborne troops for the intervention forces of the Army. The Brigade motto was: Einsatzbereit – jederzeit – weltweit ("Ready for action - anytime - worldwide"). The Brigade greeting was "Glück ab".

The brigade was previously part of the 1st Airborne Division alongside the 25th and 27th Luftlande Brigades.

== Commanders ==
The brigade commanders were (rank on takeover):

No.	Name	Takeover date	Handover date
17	Oberst Stefan Geilen	4 December 2014	31 March 2015
16	Oberst Andreas Hannemann	1 February 2012	4 December 2014
15	Oberst Eberhard Zorn	14 January 2010	31 January 2012
14	Oberst Volker Bescht	29 August 2005	14 January 2010
13	Oberst Hans-Werner Fritz	2003	29 August 2005
12	Oberst Manfred Schlenker	(2000)	(2002)
11	Oberst Henning Glawatz	(1996)	(1999)
10	Oberst Hans-Heinrich Dieter	1 April 1994	(1995)
9	Oberst Helmut Harff	1 April 1990	31 March 1994
8	Oberst Fritz Eckert	1 April 1983	31 March 1990
7	Oberst Herbert Hagenbruck	April 1976	31 March 1983
6	Oberst Hans Kubis	September 1973	March 1976
5	Oberst Helmut Liebeskind	October 1970	September 1973
4	Oberst Heinrich Schwiethal	October 1968	September 1970
3	Oberst Karl-Albert Keerl	April 1967	October 1968
2	Oberst Hans-Werner Voss	October 1963	April 1967
1	Oberst Erich Timm	October 1958	September 1963

== See also ==
- Special Operations Division
- German Army Forces Command

== Literature ==
- Sören Sünkler: Die Spezialverbände der Bundeswehr. Stuttgart: Motorbuch Verlag 2007. ISBN 3-613-02592-2
- Sören Sünkler: K-ISOM 1. Ausgabe 2008, Artikel LLBrig. 26, Sept.-Okt. 2008, KOMMANDO- International Special Operations Magazine ISSN 1866-9360.
