= Renda =

Renda may refer to:

- Renda Broadcasting, Pittsburgh-based radio broadcasting company
- Renda, Latvia, town in Latvia
- Renda Parish, parish in Latvia
- Renmin University of China, known as Renda, a public university in Haidian, Beijing, China
- National People's Congress (colloquially Renda 人大), the national legislature of China
- MT Renda, a Russian tanker that was used to supply fuel to Nome, Alaska, in 2012
- Cyrtostachys renda, palm
- Renda (beetle), a genus of rove beetle in family Staphylinidae

== People with the surname ==
- Giuseppe Renda (1772–1805), Italian painter
- Paolo Renda (1939–2010), Italian-Canadian mobster
- Sara Renda, Italian ballet dancer
- Francesco Renda (1922–2013), Italian mixed martial artist
- Cello Renda, English boxer
- Abdülhalik Renda (1881–1957), Turkish civil servant and politician
- Cenk Renda (born 1969), Turkish basketball player
- Günsel Renda, Turkish historian
- Tony Renda (born 1991), American baseball player
- Thomas A. Renda, American politician
- Hercules Renda, American football player
- Li Renda, Chinese warlord
