= German intervention against the Islamic State =

Ongoing military conflict between Germany and the Islamic State

- Part of the War against the Islamic State, the Operation Inherent Resolve and war on terror
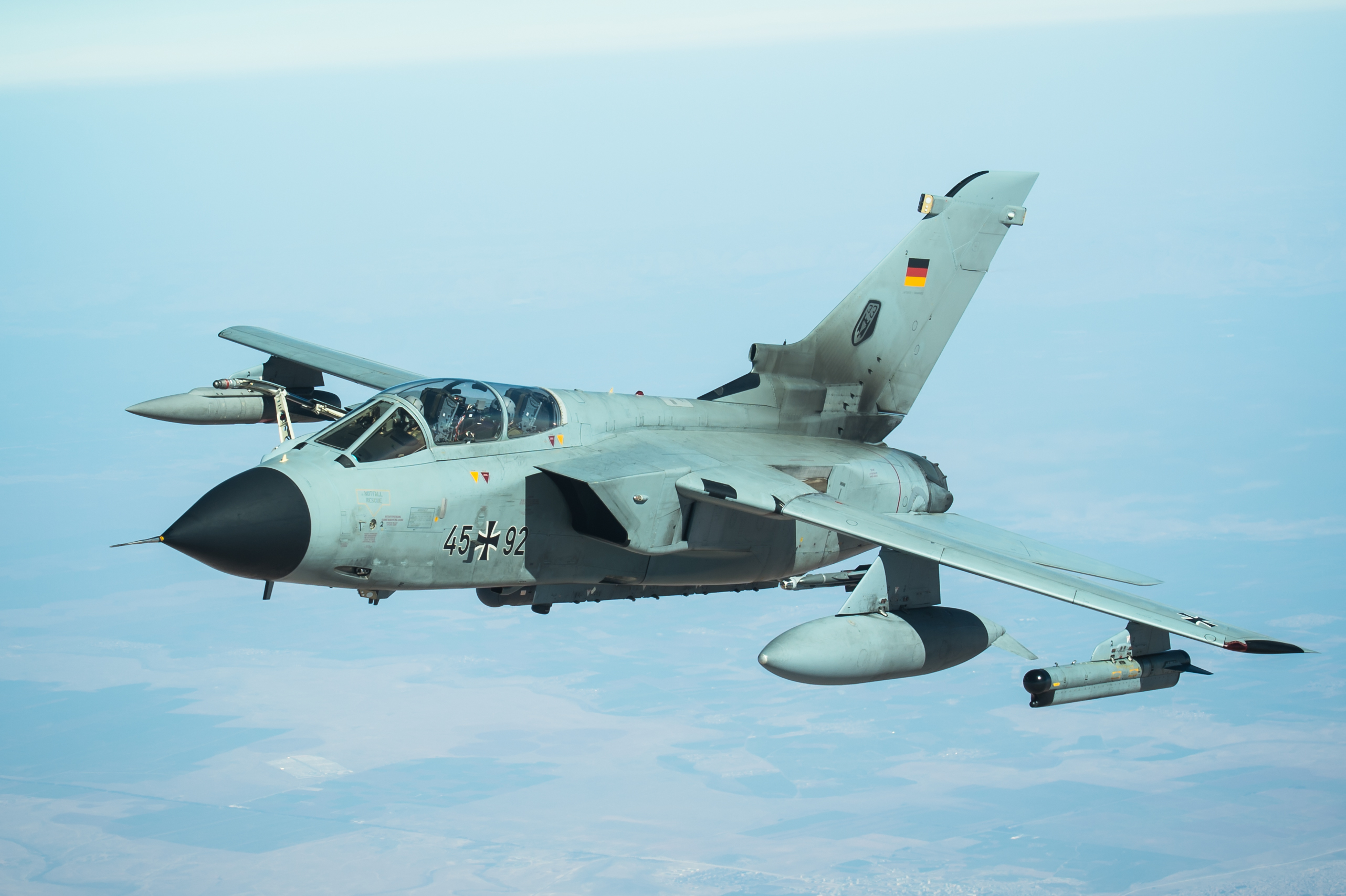
- German Air Force Panavia Tornado flying in support of CJTF–OIR
Date	4 December 2015 – 26 August 2026 (10 years and 2 months)
Location	Iraq, Syria
Status	Operations in Syria concluded in January 2022; operations in Iraq end in August 2026

Belligerents
Germany Supported by: United States; France	Islamic State

Commanders and leaders
Olaf Scholz (2021–2022); Angela Merkel (2015–2021); Robert Habeck (2021–2022); Sigmar Gabriel (2015–2018); Ursula von der Leyen (2015–2018); Annegret Kramp-Karrenbauer (2019–2021); Christine Lambrecht (2021–2022); Volker Wieker (2015–2018); Eberhard Zorn (2018–2022); Air commander: Andreas Schick (December 2015 – May 2016); Holger Radmann (May 2016 – ) Naval commander Jörg Mascow (2016)	Abu Hafs al-Hashimi al-Qurashi (Leader of IS); Abu al-Hussein al-Husseini al-Qurashi †; Abu al-Hasan al-Hashimi al-Qurashi †; Abu Ibrahim al-Hashimi al-Qurashi †; Abu Bakr al-Baghdadi †; Abu Ali al-Anbari †; Abu Suleiman al-Naser †; Abu Omar al-Shishani †; Abu Waheeb †

Units involved
German Air Force: Tactical Air Force Wing 33; Tactical Air Force Wing 51; German Navy	Military of IS

Strength
1,200 troops; 6 Tornado IDS/ECR (until March 2020); 1 A310 MRTT (until September 2019); 1 A400M; 1 Bremen-class frigate (until November 2016)	Unknown

Casualties and losses
1 killed (in Iraq)	450+ killed

The German intervention against the Islamic State (codenamed Operation Counter Daesh) was authorized on 4 December 2015. The involvement of the country in the Syrian Civil War and the War in Iraq (2013–2017) began with the Bundeswehr mission in Syria and Iraq to combat the terrorist organization Islamic State. The mission was primarily created as a reaction to the November 2015 Paris attacks.

== History ==
The deployment of the Bundeswehr had been discussed from the end of November 2015 within the German government, debated in parliament and decided on 4 December 2015 with a majority of the votes of the coalition parties CDU and SPD. As a justification it was stated that the terrorist attacks in Tunisia, Turkey, Beirut, against Russia and especially in Paris had shown that the terrorist organization acted far beyond their then controlled territories in Syria and Iraq, threatening European congeniality and security. Furthermore, with the attacks in Paris ISIL had attacked France and the liberal value system of Europe directly. Legally, the right to collective self-defence according to article 51 of the United Nations Charter was cited as a justification. In addition, the mission was designed to protect the people in the region from further systematic war crimes.

The Bundeswehr assists French forces with six Panavia Tornado reconnaissance aircraft (reduced to 4 in October 2017) and an A310 MRTT deployed to Incirlik Air Base in Turkey, and with a frigate (until November 2017). Armed attacks (such as launching air strikes alongside the international anti-ISIL coalition) were not conducted by Germany. The contingent of 1,200 soldiers is the currently largest foreign deployment of the Bundeswehr. Because of the risks associated with the complex situation in the ongoing Syrian Civil War, the policy of the Federal Government with the Bundeswehr mission is controversial. Critics such as Jakob Augstein, leftist columnist of German news magazine Der Spiegel, dubbed the mission "Merkel's War", which made Germany a "war party". In addition, the critics feared that the risk of terrorist attacks in Germany was likely to rise.

The parliamentary mandate for the mission was valid until 31 December 2016. It was extended on 10 November 2016 by another year until 31 December 2017. The military operation was reported to cost 134 million Euro.

After disputes with the Turkish government on planned visits by members of the German parliament to Incirlik Air Base, in June the German government decided to halt their operations from there and relocate the 250 German troops, six Tornados and the A310 MRTT tanker aircraft to Muwaffaq Salti Air Base in Jordan. The tanker arrived in Jordan on 9 July 2017, while all six Tornados were temporarily flown back to Germany. Four of them flew to Jordan and arrived on 4 October 2017. Germany reduced the Tornado fleet from six aircraft to four, citing ISIL's strength being reduced by that point in time.

While speaking at the inauguration of the Berlin headquarters of Germany's foreign intelligence agency BND on 8 February 2019, Chancellor Angela Merkel stated that despite ISIL losing most of its territory in recent years, the terror organization still remained "a threat" in Syria. ISIL "is transforming into an asymmetrical warfare force. And this, of course, is a threat," she said. Merkel listed monitoring the situation in Syria as main priority for the BND. "We remain a long way from peace in Syria," she added.

The German government ended its participation in military operations in Syria in January 2022. The Iraq mission was last extended in March 2026. The mission in Iraq ended in August 2026.

== Scale of operations ==
There are around 1,200 personnel involved in the mission:

- air refueling (about 150)
- education (400 to 500)
- naval (about 300)
- support staff (about 50)

On 10 December 2015, 40 personnel (in an Airbus A400M Atlas) and two Panavia Tornados flew to Incirlik Air Base as the initial contingent.

The Tornados are used in a reconnaissance role.

The Bremen-class frigate F213 Augsburg joined the naval task force of French aircraft carrier Charles de Gaulle from December 2015 to March 2016 and August to November 2016.

== Assets ==
=== German Air Force ===
- Muwaffaq Salti Air Base
  - Airbus A310-304 MRTT (until September 2019)
    - Special Air Mission Wing of the Federal Ministry of Defence (German Air Force).
  - Airbus A400M Atlas (from September 2019)
    - Air Transport Wing 62
  - Panavia Tornado IDS/ECR (until March 2020)
    - Tactical Air Force Wing 51 "Immelmann"
    - Tactical Air Force Wing 33

=== German Navy ===
The Bremen-class frigate Augsburg joined the naval task force of French aircraft carrier Charles de Gaulle from December 2015 to March 2016 and August to November 2016.

== See also ==
- War against the Islamic State
- Operation Inherent Resolve – American operation against ISIL
- Operation Okra – Australian operation against ISIL
- Operation Shader – British operation against ISIL
- Operation Impact – Canadian operation against ISIL
- Opération Chammal – French operation against ISIL
- Russian intervention in the Syrian civil war
