= Holger Kammerhoff =

German Army general (born 1945)

Lieutenant General Holger Kammerhoff
- Born: 5 March 1945 (age 81); Sankt Andreasberg, Free State of Prussia, German Reich
- Education: Bundeswehr Command and Staff College; Joint Services Command and Staff College
- Military career
- Allegiance: West Germany (to 1990); Germany
- Branch: German Army
- Service years: 1965–2006
- Rank: Generalleutnant
- Unit: Paratrooper Battalion 291
- Commands: Kosovo Force; German military contingent in Somalia; 23rd Mountain Infantry Brigade; Panzergrenadier Battalion 302
- Conflicts: UN Operation in Somalia II

Holger Kammerhoff (born 5 March 1945) is a retired German Army lieutenant general. He was commander of the Operations Command of the German Armed Forces from 2004 to 2006, commander of the Kosovo Force from 2003 to 2004, and commander of Eurocorps from 2001 to 2003.

== Early life and education ==
Kammerhoff was born on 5 March 1945 in Sankt Andreasberg, Germany.

His military education includes the Bundeswehr Command and Staff College in 1978 and the Higher Command and Staff Course of the United Kingdom's Joint Services Command and Staff College.

== Military career ==
Kammerhoff joined the German Army in 1965 and received officer training as a member of Paratrooper Battalion 291 before serving as a platoon and company commander. After completing the Bundeswehr Command and Staff College in the late 1970s he served as a staff officer in the 8th Panzer Brigade. After that Kammerhoff served on the Army Staff as deputy head of a department. He later commanded Panzergrenadier Battalion 302 from October 1983 to March 1986, before serving as a staff officer at the NATO Central Army Group, and then being the chief of staff of the 3rd Panzer Division from October 1988 to December 1990.

In the early 1990s he attended the Higher Command and Staff Course in the United Kingdom and led the military policy and operations branch at the German Army Staff. His next assignment was as commander of 23rd Gebirgsjäger Brigade from February 1992 to September 1995. From November 1993 to March 1994 he was the commander of the second German national contingent taking part in the United Nations Operation in Somalia II (UNOSOM II). The troops he commanded served in non-combat roles, and the Somalia mission was the first military operation that Germany undertook outside of the NATO area.

From 1995 to April 1996 he was General for Training and Education Affairs at the German Army Staff. He was then the deputy chief of staff of the Allied Command Europe Rapid Reaction Corps, and in that capacity led the headquarters of NATO-led Implementation Force (IFOR) in Bosnia and Herzegovina, from March to November 1996. In January 1998 he became the head of the 4th Military Region in Germany (Wehrbereichskommando IV) and commander of the 5th Panzer Division, before being assigned as assistant director of the NATO International Military Staff and the head of the Operations Division at the NATO headquarters. From December 2001 until September 2003 Kammerhoff was commander of Eurocorps, and from October 2003 to September 2004 he was commander of the NATO-led Kosovo Force.

Kammerhoff was later the commander of the Bundeswehr Operations Command until he retired from the military in March 2006.

Military offices
Preceded by Jörg Sendele	Commander of the 23rd Gebirgsjäger Brigade; 1992–1995	Succeeded by Wolf-Dieter Löser
Preceded by Helmut Harff	Commander of the German military contingent in Somalia; 1993–1994	Succeeded by Position abolished
Preceded by Klaus Frühhaber	Commander of the 5th Panzer Division; 1998–2000	Succeeded by Axel Bürgener
Preceded by Juan Ortuño Such	Commander of Eurocorps; 2001–2003	Succeeded by Jean-Louis Py
Preceded by Fabio Mini	Commander of Kosovo Force; 2003–2004	Succeeded by Yves de Kermabon
Preceded by Friedrich Reichmann	Commander of Bundeswehr Operations Command; 2004–2006	Succeeded by Karlheinz Viereck
