= Forces Command =

Forces Command is a military formation in use in at least two different armies:

- Forces Command (Australia)
- United States Army Forces Command

== See also ==
- Army Forces Command (Germany) (German: Heeresführungskommando)
