= Armoured Corps Training Centre (Germany) =

Coordinates: 52.982214°N 10.118666°E

Armoured Corps Training Centre Ausbildungszentrum Panzertruppen
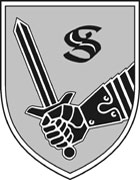
- Internal formation sign
- Active: 1956 / 1 Oct 2007
- Country: Germany
- Allegiance: Bundeswehr
- Branch: German Army
- Type: German Army Training Centre (Zentrum des Heeres)
- Part of: Munster Training Centre
- Garrison: Munster (Örtze)

The Armoured Corps Training Centre (German: Ausbildungszentrum Panzertruppen) in Munster is one of the German Army's training centres (Zentren des Heeres) with particular responsibility for the basic and continuation training of armoured troops, including the armoured and the mechanized infantry corps of the German Army. By tradition, the centre is nicknamed the Armoured Corps School (Panzertruppenschule) whose tasks it partly subsumed on 1 October 2007.

== Literature ==
- Freundeskreis der Offiziere der Panzertruppe, ed. (2006), 50 Jahre Panzertruppe der Bundeswehr (in German), Uelzen: Verlag Schneider, ISBN 3-935107-05-6
