= 5th Panzer Division (Bundeswehr) =

Former Bundeswehr division

Coordinates: 50°22′49.17″N 8°00′41.09″E

- 5. Panzer division
- 5th Panzer Division insignia
- Active: 1 October 1956 – 30 September 2001
- Country: West Germany (1956-1990); Germany (1990-2001)
- Type: Armoured Division
- Part of: III Corps

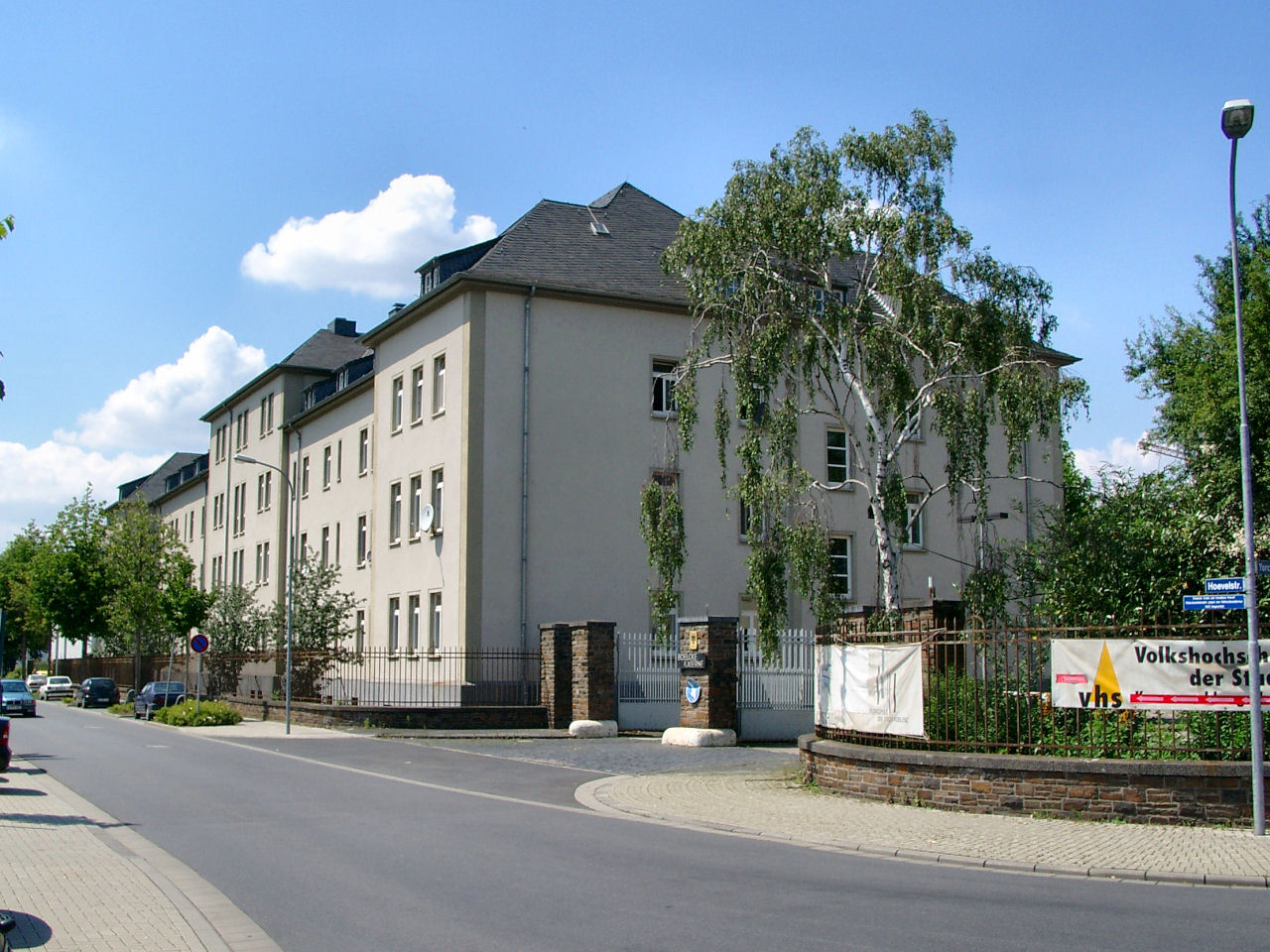
Boelcke Kaserne, Koblenz, where parts of the divisional troops of 5th Panzer Division were located

The 5th Armoured Division (5. Panzer-Division) was a West German armored formation. It was part of the III Corps of the Bundeswehr, which also incorporated in 1985 the 2nd Panzergrenadier Division and 12th Panzer Division. III Corps was part of NATO's Central Army Group (CENTAG), along with the Bundeswehr's II Corps and the American V and VII Corps. Headquarters in 1985 was at Diez/Lahn, with subordinate brigades at Wetzlar (13th PG Bde), Neustadt/Marburg (6th Panzer Brigade) and Koblenz (15th Panzergrenadier Brigade).

It played a major role in the defense of West Germany from the Soviet Union during the Cold War. The division was constituted on 1 October 1956 as part of the III Corps of the Bundeswehr. In 1985, the corps also received the 2nd Panzergrenadier Division and 12th Panzer Division. Subordinated to NATO's Central Army Group, the III Corps defended the "zone of vital defense" of NATO, at the side of the II Corps of the German Army and the U.S. Army's V and VII Corps.

Following the Soviet Union's fall, the US VII Corps was withdrawn and two combined US/German corps were created in the former CENTAG area. As part of this arrangement, 5th Armoured Division was administratively placed under the V Corps (United States) for main defence purposes. This meant that if an attack from the East was anticipated, the division would fall under U.S. control. Meanwhile, an American division would likewise fall under control of the German II or III Corps. The 5th Panzer sent some of their units to Yugoslavia in 1990. German budget constraints meant that the 5th Panzer Division had to be indefinitely disbanded on 30 June 2001.

== Commanding officers ==
- Generalmajor Heinrich Baron von Behr, 1 October 1956 – 7 December 1959
- Generalmajor Günther Pape, 1 April 1960 – 30 June 1962
- Generalmajor Albert Schnez, 1 October 1962 – 31 March 1965
- Generalmajor Heinz Hükelheim, 1 April 1965 – 30 September 1967
- Generalmajor Bernd Freytag von Loringhoven, 1 October 1967 – 30 April 1969
- Generalmajor Hans-Joachim von Hopffgarten, 1 May 1969 – 9 September 1970
- Generalmajor Heinz-Georg Lemm, 10 September 1970 – 15 January 1974
- Generalmajor Kurt von der Osten, 15 January 1974 – 26 September 1975
- Generalmajor Horst Wenner, 27 September 1975 – 30 September 1979
- Generalmajor Werner Heyd, 1 October 1979 – 7 September 1980
- Generalmajor Götz Mayer, 5 December 1980 – 30 September 1982
- Generalmajor Franz Uhle-Wettler, 1 October 1982 – 11 July 1984
- Generalmajor Wilhelm Jacoby, 11 July 1984 – 30 November 1986
- Generalmajor Peter Rohde, 1 December 1986 – 30 September 1991
- Generalmajor Dieter Stöckmann, 1 October 1991 – 24 June 1993
- Brigadegeneral Klaus von Heimendahl, 1 October 1993 – 31 March 1994
- Generalmajor Henribert Göttelmann, 1 April 1994 – 31 March 1995
- Generalmajor Klaus Frühhaber, 1 April 1995 – 30 September 1997
- Generalmajor Werner Widder, 1 October 1997 – 31 March 1998
- Generalmajor Holger Kammerhoff, 1 April 1998 – 2000
- Generalmajor Axel Bürgener, 2000 – 30 September 2001
