= General Zorn =

General Zorn may refer to:

- Eberhard Zorn (born 1960), German Army general
- Eduard Zorn (1901–1945), German Wehrmacht officer posthumously promoted to major general
- Hans Zorn (1891–1943), German Wehrmacht general
