= Harff =

Harff or von Harff is a German surname. Notable people with the surname include:

- Arnold von Harff (1471–1505), German traveler and author
- Barbara Harff (born 1942), German political scientist
- Helmut Harff (1939–2018), German military officer
- Wilhelm Maria Theodor Ernst Richard Graf von Mirbach-Harff (1871–1918), German diplomat
