= Helmut Harff =

German Army brigadier general (1939–2018)

Brigadier General Helmut Harff
- Born: 5 June 1939; Mönchengladbach, Free State of Prussia, German Reich
- Died: 8 September 2018 (aged 79)
- Education: Bundeswehr Command and Staff College; NATO Defense College
- Military career
- Allegiance: West Germany (to 1990); Germany
- Branch: German Army
- Service years: 1959–1999
- Rank: Brigadier general
- Unit: Paratrooper Battalion 262
- Commands: 26th Airborne Brigade; German military contingents in Somalia and Kosovo
- Conflicts: UN Operation in Somalia II; Kosovo War

Helmut Harff (5 June 1939 – 8 September 2018) was a German brigadier general who commanded German military contingents during peacekeeping operations in Somalia and Kosovo. He was also chief of staff of the French-led Multi-National Division Southeast in Bosnia and Herzegovina. Harff was described as one of the most experienced Bundeswehr officers after it began undertaking foreign missions in the 1990s.

Harff began his service in the German Army in 1959. He was known for commanding the first Bundeswehr operation outside of NATO territory, which was in support of the United Nations in Somalia, and during the Kosovo War became the first German general to take prisoners of war since World War II. He also received international attention after the media recorded a confrontation he had with a Serbian army colonel in Kosovo, successfully threatening him into removing his troops from a border post they were occupying. He retired from the military in 1999.

== Early life and education ==
Harff was born on 5 June 1939 in Mönchengladbach, Germany. His military education included the Bundeswehr Command and Staff College in Hamburg and the NATO Defense College in Rome. He also obtained a college degree in business administration.

== Military career ==
Harff joined the German Army as a paratrooper officer candidate on 6 April 1959. He was assigned to Paratrooper Battalion 262, where after his training was complete he held positions on the battalion staff and as a platoon and company commander. Harff later studied for a business administration degree and served as a staff officer at the 25th Airborne Brigade before attending the Bundeswehr Command and Staff College. After graduating from the general staff officer course, he worked at the German Army personnel department before becoming a staff officer at the 1st Airborne Division.

From 1980 to 1981 Harff commanded Battalion 262, then became an instructor at the Command and Staff College until 1986, when he was sent to study at the NATO Defense College in Rome. Following his return to Germany, Harff was the head of the staff that founded the Federal Academy for Security Policy, and was later the head of the department of policy for army personnel planning at the Federal Ministry of Defence.

=== Peacekeeping ===
In March 1990 Colonel Harff became commander of the 26th Airborne Brigade. In this capacity, in July 1993 he led the first German contingent deployed for the United Nations Operation in Somalia II (UNOSOM II). Harff oversaw the first Bundeswehr operation outside of NATO territory, commanding about 1,700 soldiers. Although the UN mission was a failure at bringing about peace in Somalia, it represented a new achievement for the Bundeswehr at the time, being able to assist in an operation abroad without existing regulations. Germany's involvement was seen as a success because of Harff's leadership, as he was able to coordinate different units in difficult conditions. For the Somalia operation he was awarded the United Nations Medal, the Badge of Honour of the Bundeswehr in Gold, and the 1st class cross of the Order of Merit of the Federal Republic of Germany.

Harff was transferred to the Army Office in April 1994 as the General for Central Army Affairs and the head of Department I. In 1997 he was deployed as the chief of staff of the French-led Multi-National Division Southeast in Mostar, Bosnia-Herzegovina, as part of the NATO-led Stabilization Force (SFOR). He was described as one of the most experienced Bundeswehr officers in the early years of its foreign missions.

In 1998 he was appointed as deputy commander of Airmobile Forces Command/4th Division in preparation for an expanded Bundeswehr mission in the Balkans, beginning in modern-day North Macedonia (then the Former Yugoslav Republic of Macedonia). Brigadier General Harff was then the German national commander of the Bundeswehr contingent in North Macedonia, during Operation Allied Force, the NATO bombing of Yugoslavia, and the subsequent entry of NATO peacekeeping forces into Kosovo. His force assisted with supporting Albanian refugees that crossed the border from Kosovo into North Macedonia as a result of the Kosovo War, and some Serbian military deserters also crossed the border and surrendered, asking for asylum in Germany. They were treated as prisoners of war in accordance with international law, which made Harff the first German general to take prisoners of war since World War II.

After the UN Security Council authorized a peacekeeping mission in Kosovo with United Nations Security Council Resolution 1244 on 10 June 1999, and it was also approved in Germany by a vote of the Bundestag, the German unit in North Macedonia entered Kosovo on 11 June 1999 immediately after the successful NATO bombing of Yugoslavia campaign ended the Kosovo War. They became the first German contingent of the NATO-led Kosovo Force. They entered while the Serbian Army was still in the process of withdrawing from the region. During that process Harff became involved in an incident that was recorded by television media teams. At a border crossing between Kosovo and Albania, near Morina on the Albanian side, a group of Serbian soldiers still remained there despite Serbia's agreement to withdraw. Harff arrived at the border post on 13 June and met with the commanding Serbian colonel and his officers. He asked how much time they needed to leave, and one of them answered that it would be six hours. Harff told them they had thirty minutes. They tried to argue to stall for time, to which the general responded that they now have twenty-eight minutes and that it was the "end of discussion." The Serbian troops then left the area right away.

== Later life ==
Harff retired from the military in 1999. After leaving the Bundeswehr he was the director of the Defense Committee at the Federation of German Industries. In 2006, he and several other officers criticized Karlheinz Viereck, the head of the European Union Force in the Democratic Republic of the Congo, for leaving his post to go on vacation to Sweden, which is where he was when political violence broke out in the DRC.

Harff died on 8 September 2018, at the age of 79.

== Awards and decorations ==
- Order of Merit of the Federal Republic of Germany 1st class Cross
- Badge of Honour of the Bundeswehr in Gold
- United Nations Medal

== See also ==
- Video footage of Helmut Harff telling Serbian commandant that he has only 30 minutes to leave the area

Military offices
Preceded by Fritz Eckert	Commander of the 26th Airborne Brigade; 1990–1994	Succeeded by Hans-Heinrich Dieter
Preceded by Position established	Commander of the German military contingent in Somalia; 1993	Succeeded by Holger Kammerhoff
Preceded by Position established	Commander of the German military contingent in Kosovo; 1999	Succeeded by Friedrich Riechmann
