= Army Command (Germany) =

High command of the German Army

Coordinates: 52.5908°N 13.9196°E

German Army Command
- Kommando Heer (Kdo H)
- Active: 1 October 2012
- Country: Germany
- Branch: German Army
- Type: High command
- Size: 600 staff
- Headquarters: Strausberg

Commanders
- Inspector of the Army: Generalleutnant Christian Freuding
- Deputy Inspector of the Army: Generalleutnant Heico Hübner
- Chief of Staff: Generalmajor Jared Sembritzki

The German Army Command (German: Kommando Heer, Kdo H) is the high command of the German Army of the Bundeswehr. The headquarters is also the staff of the Inspector of the Army, the most senior Army officer. It was formed in 2012, as a merger of the Army Office (Heeresamt), Army Staff (Führungsstab des Heeres), and Army Forces Command (Heeresführungskommando), as part of a larger reorganization of the Bundeswehr. It is based at the von-Hardenberg-Kaserne in Strausberg, Brandenburg.

The command supports the army inspector in performing his planning, command, control and control tasks. It ensures the operational readiness of the army in material and personnel terms and directs the subordinate units and departments:

- Army Development Office (Amt für Heeresentwicklung), (Cologne)
- Training Command (Ausbildungskommando), (HQ Leipzig)
- 1st Panzer Division (Bundeswehr) (HQ Oldenburg)
- 10th Panzer Division (Bundeswehr) (HQ Veitshöchheim)
- Rapid Forces Division (HQ Stadtallendorf)

== See also ==
- Structure of the German Army
