= Leo Hepp =

German military officer

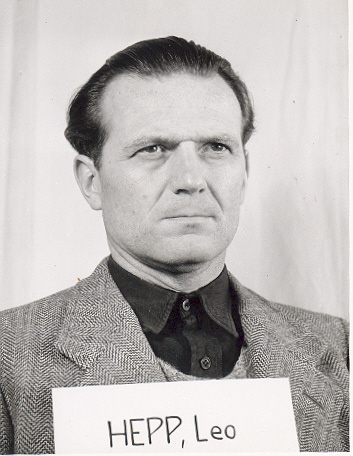
- Hepp as a witness at the Nuremberg Trials
- Born: August 14, 1907; Ulm, German Empire
- Died: October 24, 1987 (aged 80); Bonn, West Germany
- Military career
- Allegiance: Weimar Republic (to 1933) Nazi Germany (to 1945) West Germany
- Branch: Reichsheer; German Army; German Army (Bundeswehr)
- Service years: 1925–1945; 1956–1971
- Rank: Oberleutnant (Reichswehr); Oberst (Wehrmacht); Generalleutnant (Bundeswehr)
- Commands: 10th Panzer Division; II Corps
- Awards: Grand Cross of Merit with Star

Leo Philipp Franz Hepp (15 August 1907 – 24 October 1987) was a German military officer, who served as a high-ranking signals officer in the Nazi German Wehrmacht during World War II and as a lieutenant general in the Bundeswehr after the war.

== Early life and education ==
Hepp was born in Ulm, the son of military veterinarian Dr. Leo Hepp (1871–1950). He completed his secondary education at Karlsgymnasium in Stuttgart, taking his Abitur in the spring of 1925.

== Career ==
=== Pre-war ===
After taking his Abitur earlier in 1925, Hepp enlisted in the Reichswehr and was assigned to Signals Detachment 5 in Bad Cannstatt. After attending the Infantry School in Dresden and Artillery School in Jüterbog, he was commissioned as a Leutnant in Signals Detachment 5 and a few years later he was promoted to Oberleutnant. From 1935 to 1937, Hepp was an intelligence instructor at the Munich Kriegsschule of the Wehrmacht.

=== World War II ===
During World War II, he initially served on the Western Front in France as a staff officer of the 12th Army, before being sent in December 1940 to the Balkans. On 2 March 1941 he arrived in Bucharest, and when the 12th Army participated in the occupation of Greece shortly thereafter he served as a logistics staff officer in Thessaloniki and Athens. From July 1942 to May 1943, he served as the personnel staff officer for the 9th Infantry Division, with the rank of Oberstleutnant. From February 1944 to the end of the war in May 1945, Hepp served as chief of staff for the Chief Signals Officer at the Oberkommando der Wehrmacht, under General der Nachrichtentruppe Erich Fellgiebel and Generalleutnant Albert Praun.

=== Post-war ===
After the war, Hepp was kept as a prisoner of the United States military, and called as a witness at the Nuremberg Trials. He joined the Gehlen Organization, a German intelligence agency established in Allied-occupied Germany by the U.S. Office of Strategic Services, serving as the head of signals intelligence from 1946 to 1956. Under Hepp's leadership, West Germany's first electronic listening posts were set up to spy on East Germany, including the famous post at Tutzing disguised as the private firm "Südlabor GmbH". His department of the Gehlen Organization was very helpful to the U.S. intelligence community's efforts to track the movements of Soviet fighter and attack aircraft units. His successor as head of signals intelligence was his old boss Albert Praun.

=== Bundeswehr ===
In September 1956, Hepp joined the newly formed armed forces of West Germany, the Bundeswehr. From December 1959 to October 1960, he was commander of the newly formed 10th Panzer Division headquartered in Sigmaringen. From October 1960 to September 1961, he was Deputy Inspector of the Army and Chief of the General Staff, based in Bonn. In October 1961, Hepp was appointed the commander of the II Corps headquartered in Ulm, and in February 1962, he was promoted to the rank of Generalleutant. While he was corps commander, he had to handle the controversy surrounding the "Nagold affair" in 1963. This ensued when a recruit collapsed from heat exhaustion during a march of the 6/9 Fallschirmjäger Training Company from Nagold on July 25, and died in hospital a week later. Hepp made the decision, without consulting the Federal Ministry of Defence, to disband the training company for not adhering to proper training methods. In May 1967, Hepp was awarded the Grand Cross of Merit with Star. In September 1967, Hepp retired from the Bundeswehr and passed command of II Corps on to Generalleutnant Karl Wilhlem Thilo.

=== Federal Intelligence Service ===
After his retirement from the military, Hepp returned briefly to intelligence, serving in the Federal Intelligence Service from 1970 to 1972 as the leader of the signals intelligence division at Pullach.

Military offices
Preceded by Generalmajor Joachim Schwatlo-Gesterding	Deputy Inspector of the Army; 1 October 1960 – 30 September 1961	Succeeded by Generalmajor Karl-Wilhelm Thilo
New title	Commander of 10th Panzer Division (Bundeswehr); 8 December 1959 – 21 October 1960	Succeeded by Generalmajor Johann Adolf Graf von Kielmansegg
