= Heinrich Baron von Behr =

German officer and Knight's Cross recipients

- Born: 26 June 1902; Roennen, Courland Governorate, Russian Empire (Now Kuldīga Municipality, Latvia)
- Died: 14 August 1983 (aged 81); Bonn, West Germany
- Relatives: ∞ 1936 Jutta Seydel
- Military career
- Allegiance: Weimar Republic; Nazi Germany; West Germany
- Branch: Baltische Landeswehr; Reichswehr; Heer; Bundeswehr
- Service years: 1919–45; 1956–62
- Rank: Generalmajor
- Commands: 90th Light Infantry Division; 5th Armoured Division (Bundeswehr)
- Conflicts: World War II: Invasion of Poland; Battle of France; Operation Barbarossa; North African Campaign; Operation Crusader; Battle of Gazala; Battle of Bir Hakeim; First Battle of El Alamein; Second Battle of El Alamein; Italian Campaign; Battle of Monte Cassino; Operation Shingle; Gothic Line Offensive; Spring 1945 offensive in Italy
- Awards: Knight's Cross of the Iron Cross; Order of Merit of the Federal Republic of Germany

Heinrich Alexander Ferdinand Baron von Behr (26 June [O.S. 13 June] 1902 – 14 August 1983) was a Baltic German general during World War II.

== Early life and education ==
In 1902, Heinrich von Behr was born into the Baltic German noble von Behr family, which owned Renda Manor. During the Latvian War of Independence, von Behr joined the Baltische Landeswehr in January 1919.

After the properties of the von Behr family in Latvia were seized during the Latvian agrarian reform in 1920, von Behr moved to Weimar Germany, where in 1922 he joined the 16th Cavalry Regiment, 3rd Cavalry Division of the Reichswehr. In 1937 he became a teacher and pentathlon coach in the Wünsdorf Military Sports School (Heeressportschule Wünsdorf).

== World War II ==
During WWII, von Behr led reconnaissance troops during action in Poland, France, the Eastern Front, North Africa and Italy. In December 1944 he was appointed commander of tank units on the Italian front, and in April 1945 as commander of the 90th Light Infantry Division. He was a recipient of the Knight's Cross of the Iron Cross with Oak Leaves of Nazi Germany.

== Surrender 1945 ==
Behr surrendered to the British troops in April 1945 and was held until August 1947. Afterwards, from 3 September 1956, entering as Brigadegeneral, he served in the Bundeswehr of West Germany, commanding the 5th Armoured Division since December 1959. He retired in September 1962 at the rank of a Generalmajor (promoted on 1 July 1957) and died in Bonn in 1983.

== Awards and decorations ==
- Baltic Cross
- German Reich Sport Badge in Bronze
- Wehrmacht Long Service Award, 4th to 3rd Class
- Iron Cross (1939), 2nd and 1st Class
  - 2nd Class on 20 April 1940
  - 1st Class on 24 June 1940
- General Assault Badge in Silver on 20 July 1942
- Eastern Medal on 15 August 1942
- Medal for the Italian-German campaign in Africa
- Africa Cuff Band on 29 August 1943
- Sardinia Field Cap Shield (Sardinienschild)
- Close Combat Clasp in Bronze
- Silver Rider's Pin (House Order of General Ernst-Günther Baade)
- Knight's Cross of the Iron Cross with Oak Leaves
  - Knight's Cross on 24 February 1944 as Oberst and commander of Panzer-Grenadier-Regiment 200/90. Panzergrenadier-Division
  - 689th Oak Leaves on 9 January 1945 as Oberst and commander of Panzer-Grenadier-Regiment 200/90. Panzergrenadier-Division
- Order of Merit of the Federal Republic of Germany, Commander's Cross of the Order of Merit (Großes Verdienstkreuz) on 19 September 1962

Military offices
| Preceded by Generalleutnant Gerhard von Schwerin | Commander of 90. Panzer-Grenadier-Division; 1 April 1945 - 28 April 1945 | Succeeded by None |
| Preceded by None | Commander of 5. Panzer-Division (Bundeswehr); 1 October 1956 – 7 December 1959 | Succeeded by Generalmajor Günther Pape |
