= Army Training Centres =

The Army Training Centres (German: Zentren des Heeres), together with the Army Training Schools (Schulen des Heeres), form the training establishments of the German Army within the Bundeswehr. They are subordinated to the German Army Office (Heeresamt). Several are not (exclusively) charged with training, but are also support establishments that, e. g. are responsible for Army logistics or the maintenance and operations of training facilities, including the military training areas. The distinction between training centres and schools or arms schools in the Army is sometimes blurred. For example, many centres that are charged with basic and continuation training for an arm or service are run by a general who is the head of arm, such as the General of the Armoured Corps (General der Panzertruppen).

The individual Army Training Centres are:

- Special Operations Training Centre (Ausbildungszentrum Spezielle Operationen) at Pfullendorf
- Munster Training Centre (Ausbildungszentrum Munster) at Munster
  - Army Reconnaissance Training Centre (Ausbildungszentrum Heeresaufklärungstruppe) at Munster
  - Army Air Defence Training Centre (Ausbildungszentrum Heeresflugabwehrtruppe) at Munster, Rendsburg
    - Munster Officer Training Battalion (Offizieranwärterbataillon Munster)
  - Armoured Corps Training Centre (Ausbildungszentrum Panzertruppen) at Munster
- Army Combat Simulation Centre (Gefechtssimulationszentrum Heer) at Wildflecken
- Army Combat Training Centre (Gefechtsübungszentrum Heer) at Letzlingen
- Army Tactics Centre (Taktikzentrum des Heeres) at Dresden (attached to the Army Officer Training School or Offizierschule des Heeres)

== Former training centres ==
- The Bundeswehr Military Intelligence Centre (Feldnachrichtenzentrum der Bundeswehr) was a training establishment and provider of troops for military intelligence units. Since 2007 it has been incorporated into the Army Reconnaissance Training Centre (Ausbildungszentrum Heeresaufklärungstruppe)
- Army Logistics Centre (Logistikzentrum des Heeres), Bad Neuenahr was incorporated in 2008 as Department V within the German Army Office.

== See also ==
- Army Training Schools
- Military training area
