= Army Training Schools =

Formation sign of the Army Training Schools

The German Army Training Schools (German: Schulen des Heeres) are the training establishments of the German Army, alongside the Army Training Centres (Zentren des Heeres).

== Command ==
The training schools are subordinated to the Army Office. The commander of all training schools is the Deputy Head of the Army Office. Most of the German Army training schools are responsible for the continuation training of a specific arm of service. The commander of each school is usually also the General of the Artillery, General of the Infantry, General of the Armoured Corps, etc. This appointment, despite the name, may be filled by a colonel (Oberst); most however are filled by an officer holding the rank of brigadier general (Brigadegeneral).

Since 2008 the Commander of Army Training Schools has been Brigadegeneral Heinrich Fischer who is based in the Army Office at Cologne.

== Organisation ==
The individual training schools are:

- School of NBC and Self-Protection (ABC- und Selbstschutzschule) at Sonthofen
- School of Artillery (Artillerieschule) at Idar-Oberstein
  - Idar-Oberstein Officer Training Battalion (Offizieranwärterbataillon) at Idar-Oberstein
- School of Mountain and Winter Warfare (Gebirgs- und Winterkampfschule) at Mittenwald
- School of Army Aviation (Heeresfliegerwaffenschule), Bückeburg
- School of Infantry (Infanterieschule) at Hammelburg
  - Hammelburg Officer Training Battalion (Offizieranwärterbataillon Hammelburg)
- School of Airborne and Air Transport (Luftlande- und Lufttransportschule) at Altenstadt
- Army Officer Training School (Offizierschule des Heeres) at Dresden
- School of Engineering and Army Construction Engineering College (Pionierschule und Fachschule des Heeres für Bautechnik) at Ingolstadt
- Land Systems School of Technology and Army Technical College (Technische Schule Landsysteme und Fachschule des Heeres für Technik) at Aachen
- Army NCO Training School (Unteroffizierschule des Heeres) at Weiden, Delitzsch, Münster

The officer cadets carry out their service in officer training battalions that are attached to two arms schools and at the Army Air Defence Training Centre (Ausbildungszentrum Heeresflugabwehrtruppe)

== See also ==
- German Army Training Centres
