= Heinz-Georg Lemm =

German general

- Born: 1 June 1919; Schwerin, Germany
- Died: 17 November 1994 (aged 75); Ruppichteroth, Germany
- Military career
- Allegiance: Nazi Germany; West Germany
- Branch: Wehrmacht; German Army
- Service years: 1935–45; 1957–79
- Rank: Oberst (Wehrmacht); Generalleutnant (Bundeswehr)
- Commands: Chief of the Army Office
- Conflicts: World War II
- Awards: Knight's Cross of the Iron Cross with Oak Leaves and Swords; Great Cross of Merit with Star

Heinz-Georg Lemm (1 June 1919 – 17 November 1994) was a German Oberst (colonel) of the Wehrmacht and general in the Bundeswehr who served as Chief of the Army Office.

== Career ==
During World War II, Lemm served in the Wehrmacht and was a recipient of the Knight's Cross of the Iron Cross with Oak Leaves and Swords. He was promoted to Major 1943, Oberstleutnant 1944 and Oberst 1945.

Lemm joined the Bundeswehr in 1957 and commanded the 7th Panzergrenadier-Brigade of the 3rd Panzer-Division in Hamburg until 1963, when he was promoted to Brigadegeneral. In 1970 he was promoted to Generalmajor and commanded the 5th Panzer-Division in Diez. Promoted further in 1974, he was named Chief of the Troop Office of the Bundeswehr, with the rank of Generalleutnant. He was awarded the Great Cross of Merit with Star and the Legion of Merit; he retired in 1979. After this he became honorary president (Ehrenpräsident) of the Association of Knight's Cross Recipients.

== Awards ==
- Iron Cross (1939) 2nd Class (6 October 1939) & 1st Class (31 December 1940)
- Wound Badge in Silver
- Demyansk Shield
- Infantry Assault Badge in Silver
- Eastern Medal
- Close Combat Clasp in Bronze and Silver
- Tank Destruction Badge for Individual Combatants
- German Cross in Gold on 19 December 1941 as Oberleutnant in the 2./Infanterie-Regiment 27
- Knight's Cross of the Iron Cross with Oak Leaves and Swords
  - Knight's Cross on 14 April 1943 as Hauptmann and commander of I./Füsilier-Regiment 27
  - Oak Leaves on 11 July 1944 as Major and commander of I./Füsilier-Regiment 27
  - Swords on 15 March 1945 as Oberstleutnant and commander of Füsilier-Regiment 27
- Great Cross of Merit with Star
- Legion of Merit
- Grand Officer of the Order of Orange-Nassau with swords on 19 November 1971
