= Army Forces Command (Germany) =

Former leadership pillar of the German Army

Coordinates: 50°22′20″N 7°35′00″E

- Insignia
- Active: 1994–2012
- Country: Germany
- Branch: German Army
- Type: High command
- Size: 450 staff
- Garrison/HQ: Falckenstein Barracks, Koblenz

The Army Forces Command (German: Heeresführungskommando) in Falckenstein Barracks in Koblenz was one of the two leadership pillars of the German Army, together with the German Army Office, before it was merged into the Army Command (Kommando Heer).

Since 1994, Army Forces Command, as a higher command authority, has directed the majority of military units within the Army. However, army troops on operations abroad are commanded by the Bundeswehr Operations Command of the Bundeswehr based at Potsdam. At its merger in 2012 Army Forces Command had about 83,500 soldiers in its subordinate organisations. Army Forces Command was last led by Lt. Gen. Carl-Hubertus von Butler and reports to the German General Staff.

== Badge ==
The Army Forces Command badge is similar to the badge of the former III Corps, although it lacks the Roman numeral. It portrays the symbol of German sovereignty, the federal eagle. Its colour scheme is based on that of the German Federation: black, red and gold. The badge is worn by military personnel on the staff of the Command on the left sleeve of their service dress. The braided black and gold piping represents its status above the Army's divisions, which have silver instead of gold braid.

== Tasks ==
The primary functions of the Command were:

- Full military command of all subordinate formations and staffs
- Allocation of troops to operations and training
- Planning and managing the training and exercise activity of the Army
- In exceptional cases, command of smaller operations (normally the task of the Bundeswehr Operations Command)

== History ==
Until the 1990s, the German Army was led on operations by NATO. The change in the security situation in Europe resulting from the dissolution of the Soviet Union required a national German command to be formed.

Following the disbandment of III Corps, Army Forces Command was formed in the same location in Koblenz on 31 March 1994 from elements of the former corps staff and placed under command of Lieutenant General Klaus Reinhardt. From 2001, with the Army's division reporting directly to Army Forces Command, the corps level of command was dropped. In 2002, the Bundeswehr Operations Command in Potsdam was established and, from then on, German troops on international operations are commanded from there. Before that, Army Forces Command led a number of operations, beginning in 1995, such as IFOR, SFOR, AFOR and Kosovo Force (KFOR) in the Balkans and the International Security Assistance Force in Afghanistan.

== Commanders ==
Army Forces Command was led by a lieutenant general. The general in charge of Army Forces Command from 16 March 2009 was Lieutenant General Carl-Hubertus von Butler. He succeeded Lieutenant General Wolfgang Otto. Reporting to the commander were his deputy (a major general) and his chief of staff (a brigadier general). The staff of Army Command consisted of some 400 soldiers and 50 civilians. The fourth post at general level in the time of Drew and Korte was the post of the General of National and Territorial Tasks (GNTA).

== Staff Organisation ==
- G1: personnel and administration
- G2: Army intelligence, arms control, meteorology and geo
- G3: command, planning, operational readiness, training and exercise planning
- G4: logistics / materiel / maintenance
- G5: civil-military cooperation (CIMIC)
- G6: communications / IT / command support
- Surgeon-General: head of Army medical services, planning and advice on medical support
- PIZ: The Press and Information Centre; informing the public and organizing military bands
- Troops Psychology: advice to the commander on psychological issues
- Legal advice: legal advice to the commander
- Controlling/centralised tasks: monitoring expenditure and the budget, optimization

Army Forces Command also has links to the US Army Command (JHC Heidelberg), the French Army, the Dutch Army, the British Army, as well as the Luftwaffe, and German Navy.

== Forces under Command ==
German Army - major formation locations

From 2010, Army Forces Command has the following formations under command as part of "Army 2010" (Heer 2010) or the New Army" (Neues Heer):

- Army Forces Command in Koblenz
  - Franco-German Brigade at Müllheim (German element)
  - Intervention Forces Division / 1st Armoured Division at Hanover
    - Panzerlehrbrigade 9 at Munster
    - 21st (Lipperland) Armoured Brigade at Augustdorf
  - Special Operations Division at Stadtallendorf
    - 26th (Saarland) Airborne Brigade at Saarlouis
    - 31st (Oldenburg) Airborne Brigade at Oldenburg
    - Special Forces Command (brigade-level) at Calw
  - Airmobile Operations Division at Veitshöchheim
    - 1st Airmobile Brigade at Fritzlar
    - Army Combat Support Brigade (Heerestruppenbrigade) at Bruchsal
  - 10th Armoured Division (Sigmaringen)
    - 23rd Mountain Infantry Brigade "Bavaria" at Bad Reichenhall
    - 12th Armoured Brigade "Upper Palatinate" at Amberg
  - 13th Mechanized Infantry Division (Leipzig)
    - 37th Mechanized Infantry Brigade "Saxony" at Frankenberg/Sa.
    - 41st Mechanized Infantry Brigade "West Pomerania" at Torgelow

In addition the following central depots also answer to the Army Command:

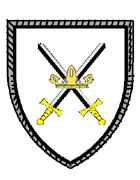
- Herongen Army Central Depot
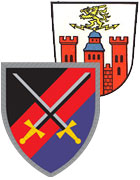
- Pirmasens Army Central Depot
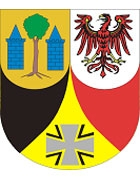
- Central Mobilisation Base at Brück

Multinational formations

Army Forces Command also provided forces for EU Battlegroups, for the NATO Response Force and for the United Nations when asked. In addition to the Franco-German Brigade, Army Command provides permanent German elements on the staffs and supporting units as well as other troops for:

- Eurocorps (Straßburg)
  - German elements of the staff
  - Franco-German Brigade
  - 10th Armoured Division when required
- 1 (German/Netherlands) Corps (Münster)
  - German elements in two permanent battalions and one staff company
- Multinational Corps Northeast (Stettin)
  - German elements of the staff
  - 13th Mechanized Infantry Division when required for the Danish-Polish-German Corps

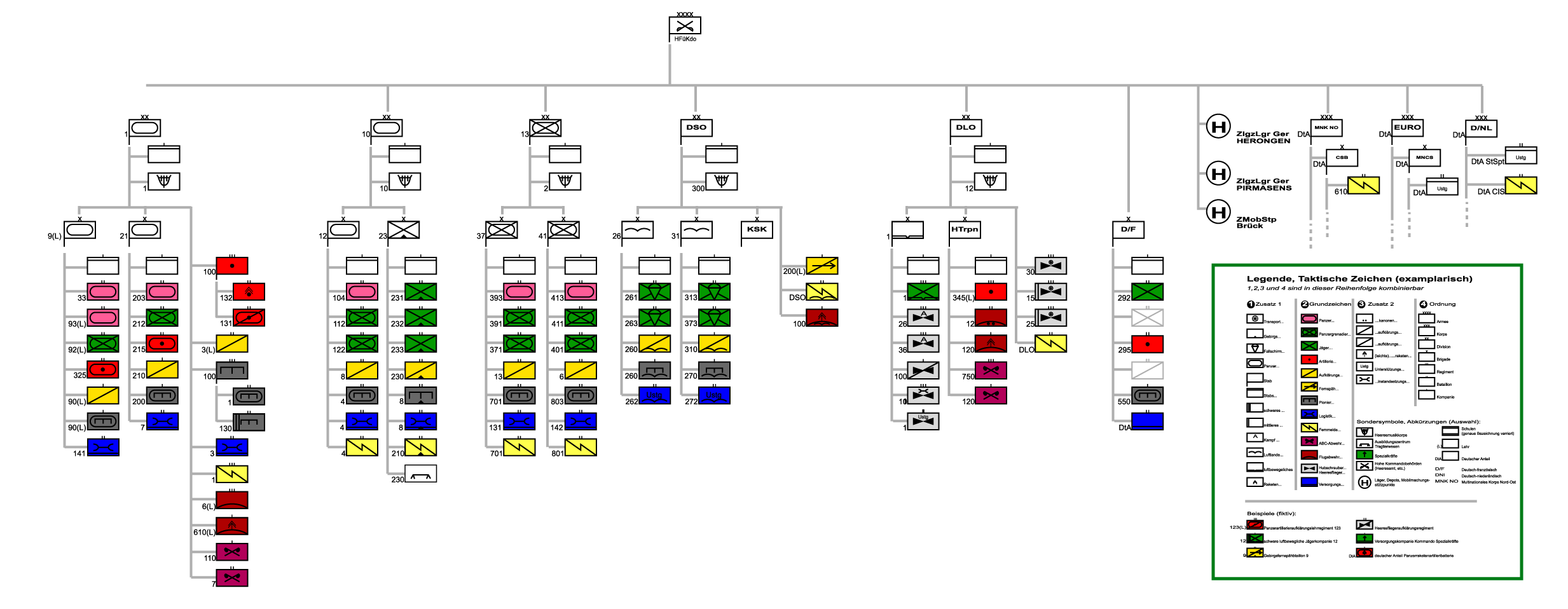
Structure of German Army Forces Command
