= Renda, Latvia =

Village in Latvia

Coordinates: 57°04′N 22°17′E

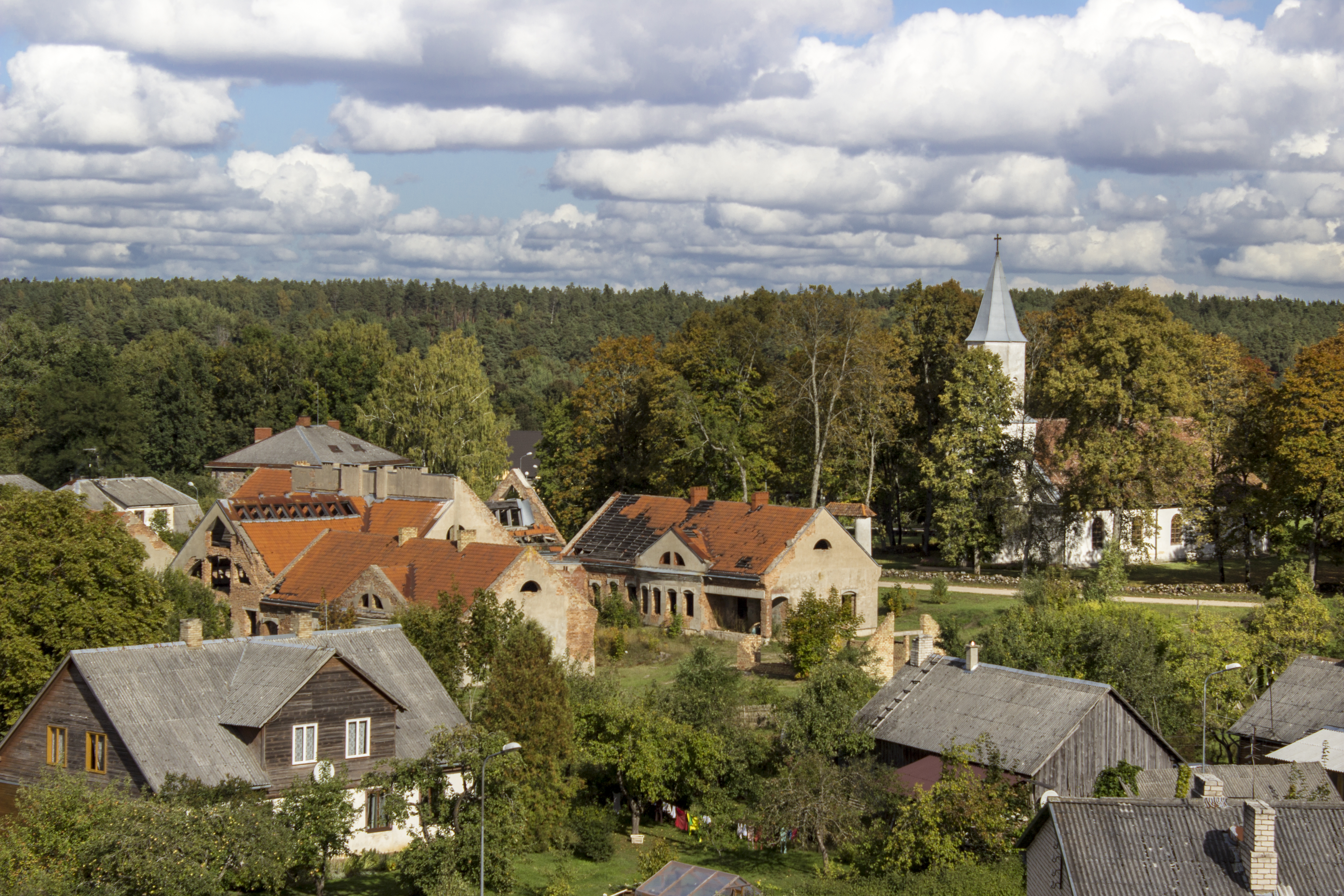
View to the village

Renda (German: Rönnen) is a village located in Renda Parish in the northeast section of Kuldīga Municipality in the Courland region of Latvia. It is famous for being the birthplace of the soldier Pēteris Dzelzītis. Located within the village is the Renda Church, established in 1786.

== See also ==
- Heinrich Baron von Behr
