= Army Office =

Former command pillar of the German Army

Coordinates: 50.897363°N 6.948509°E

Army Office Heeresamt
- Active: 16 February 1956–27 June 2013
- Country: Germany
- Branch: German Army
- Type: High command authority
- Size: 1,100 (staff) around 12,000 (incl. agencies)
- Part of: General Staff (Führungsstab des Heeres)
- Headquarters: Cologne
- Motto: Heeresamt – Die Zukunft im Visier ("Army Office - the Future in our Sights")

Commanders
- Last Department Head: Generalmajor Erhard Drews
- Last Deputy and Commander of Army Training Schools: Brigadegeneral Heinrich Fischer
- Notable commanders: Generalleutnant Heinz-Georg Lemm; Generalleutnant Hellmuth Mäder

The Army Office (German: Heeresamt, HA) in Cologne was one of the two command pillars of the German Army, alongside the Army Forces Command (Heeresführungskommando, HFüKdo), until both were merged to create the current Army Command (Kommand Heer, KdoHeer). This disbandment and merging was done according to the new direction of the Bundeswehr, and the 2011 Basing Concept (Stationierungskonzept 2011).

At the time of its merger, the Army Office was made up 1,100 soldiers and civil servants who were responsible for the conceptual development of the Army, as well as its training and equipment. In addition the Army Office was responsible for the organisational structure of the Army, for issues to do with in-service systems, and for managing logistic support to the Army. Reporting to the Army Office were the Training Schools and Training Centres. The Army Office was subordinate to the General Staff.

After the disbandment of the Army Office and its merger with the Army Forces Command, its premises and large parts of its personnel have been transferred to the new Army Concepts and Capabilities Development Centre (Amt für Heeresentwicklung, AHEntwg), which also inherited the Army Office's Motto.

== Department heads ==
No.	Name	Takeover date	Handover date
16	Generalmajor Erhard Drews	1 January 2013	27 June 2013
–	Brigadegeneral Heinrich Fischer (acting)	1 June 2012	31 December 2012
15	Generalmajor Wolf-Joachim Clauß	15 November 2006	1 June 2012
14	Generalmajor Wolfgang Korte	1 March 2005	15 November 2006
13	Generalmajor Jürgen Ruwe	1 October 2003	1 March 2005
12	Generalmajor Werner Widder	31 March 2001	September 2003
11	Generalmajor Manfred Dietrich	1 April 1999	31 March 2001
10	Generalmajor Jürgen Reichardt	1 April 1994	31 March 1999
9	Generalleutnant Ernst Klaffus	1 April 1990	31 March 1994
8	Generalleutnant Wolfgang Odendahl	1 December 1986	31 March 1990
7	Generalleutnant Gerhard Wachter	1 April 1986	30 November 1986
6	Generalleutnant Werner Schäfer	1 April 1983	31 March 1986
5	Generalleutnant Horst Wenner	1 October 1979	31 March 1983
4	Generalleutnant Heinz-Georg Lemm	1 April 1974	30 September 1979
3	Generalleutnant Hubert Sonneck	1 October 1968	31 March 1974
2	Generalleutnant Hellmuth Mäder	1 October 1960	30 September 1968
1	Generalmajor Helmuth Reinhardt	1 June 1956	30 September 1960
