= Renda Parish =

Parish of Latvia

- parish of Latvia
- Coat of arms

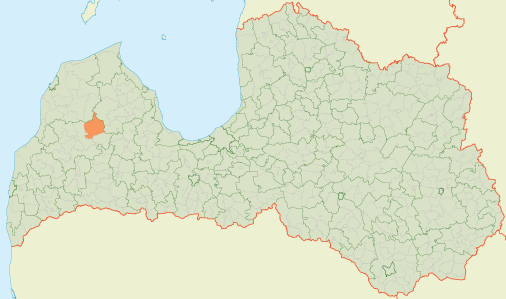
- 57°03′35″N 22°13′04″E

- Location within Latvia
- Country: Latvia

Area
  - Total: 263.32 km^{2} (101.67 sq mi)
  - Land: 251.95 km^{2} (97.28 sq mi)
  - Water: 11.37 km^{2} (4.39 sq mi)

Population (1 January 2026)
  - Total: 750
  - Density: 3.0/km^{2} (7.7/sq mi)
- Website: www.renda.lv

Renda Parish (Latvian: Rendas pagasts) is an administrative unit of Kuldīga Municipality in the Courland region of Latvia. The parish has a population of 1091 (as of 1/07/2010) and covers an area of 263.35 km^{2}. The administrative center is the village of Renda.

== Villages of Renda parish ==
- Āpciems
- Ezeri
- Jaunmeži
- Kroņrenda
- Mazrenda
- Ozoli
- Renda
- Tiezumi
