= Army Staff (Germany) =

Coordinates: 50.699203°N 7.040541°E

Army Staff in MOD Germany — XXX —
- Führungsstab des Heeres (Fü H) im BMVg
- Formation sign of the military division
- Active: November 1957–October 2012
- Country: Germany
- Allegiance: Bundeswehr
- Branch: German Army
- Type: Dept. of Federal Ministry of Defence & highest command level in German Army
- Size: 180
- Location: Hardthöhe, Bonn, North Rhine-Westphalia
- Website: www.bmvg.de

The Army Staff, in the meaning of the Army general staff, of the German Army (German: Führungsstab des Heeres - Fü H) was a department of the Federal Ministry of Defence and one of the five staff headquarters in the military command of the Bundeswehr. The Army Staff was thus at the same time a ministerial division and the highest level of military command within the German Army. It was merged with the other high command authorities of the German Army to form the Army Command (Kommando Heer) in 2012.

In 2012, there existed in MOD Germany supreme military command authority as follows:

- Armed Forces Staff (Führungsstab der Streitkräfte – Fü S; General Staff of the Armed Forces)
- Army Staff (Führungsstab des Heeres – Fü H; Army General Staff)
- Air Force Staff (Führungsstab der Luftwaffe – Fü L; Air Force General Staff)
- Navy Staff (Führungsstab der Marine – Fü M)
- Medical Staff (Führungsstab des Sanitätsdienstes – Fü San; Medical Service Staff)

== Command ==
The Army Staff was commanded by the Inspector of the Army (Inspekteur des Heeres), effectively fulfilling the role of Chief of the Army. The Inspector holds the rank of Generalleutnant, and commanded the Army Staff, reporting to the Federal Minister of Defence. The General Inspector of the Bundeswehr and the Armed Forces Staff who work for him are only authorised to issue directives to the Army Staff in the fields of development and the realisation of the overall concept for the Bundeswehr. The Army Staff comprised about 180 soldiers and civil servants.

== Mission ==
The Army Staff was the highest level of command in the German Army. The staff ensured the readiness of the Army from a materiel and personnel perspective. In addition the two command pillars of the Army, the Army Forces Command and the Army Office, were subordinate to the Army Staff. Furthermore, the staff supported the Inspector of the Army and the Federal Minister of Defence in their ministerial duties.

== Deputy Inspector General of the Army ==
The Deputy Inspector General of the Army (in the Army Staff of MOD Germany) appointment was normally assigned to a three star rank, OF8-general (Generalleutnant / lieutenant general) rank.

N°	Rank, name	Time in service	
N°	Rank, name	Start	End
26	Generalleutnant Reinhard Kammerer	11 September 2012	until decommissioning
25	Generalleutnant Bruno Kasdorf	16 September 2010	11 September 2012
24	Generalleutnant Günter Weiler	1 March 2006	16 September 2010
23	Generalleutnant Jürgen Ruwe	1 March 2005	January 2006
22	Generalleutnant Manfred Dietrich	2001	1 March 2005
21	Generalleutnant Gert Gudera	1 October 2000	28 March 2001
20	Generalleutnant Edgar Trost	1997	2000
19	Generalleutnant Winfried Weick	1 April 1994	1997
18	Generalleutnant Hartmut Bagger	1 April 1992	31 March 1994
17	Generalleutnant Harald Schulz	1 April 1988	31 March 1992
16	Generalleutnant Wolfgang Malecha	1 April 1986	31 March 1988
15	Generalleutnant Heinz Kasch	1 April 1983	31 March 1986
14	Generalleutnant Eberhard Burandt	1 October 1979	31 March 1983
13	Generalleutnant Rudolf Reichenberger	1 January 1977	30 September 1979
12	Generalleutnant Rüdiger von Reichert	1 October 1974	15 December 1976
11	Generalleutnant Siegfried Schulz	1 October 1971	30 September 1974
10	Generalleutnant Ernst Ferber	January 1970	30 September 1971
9	Generalmajor Hellmut Grashey	November 1968	31 December 1969
8	Generalmajor Karl Schnell	1 October 1968	November 1968
7	Generalmajor Hubert Sonneck	8 September 1966	30 September 1968
6	Generalmajor Josef Moll	1 January 1965	24 August 1966
5	Generalmajor Karl-Wilhelm Thilo	1 October 1961	31 December 1964
4	Generalmajor Leo Hepp	October 1960	30 September 1961
3	Generalmajor Joachim Schwatlo-Gesterding	1958	September 1960
2	Brigadegeneral Hellmuth Laegeler	1957	1958
1	Brigadegeneral Peter von der Groeben	1957	1957
