= Volker Wieker =

German general

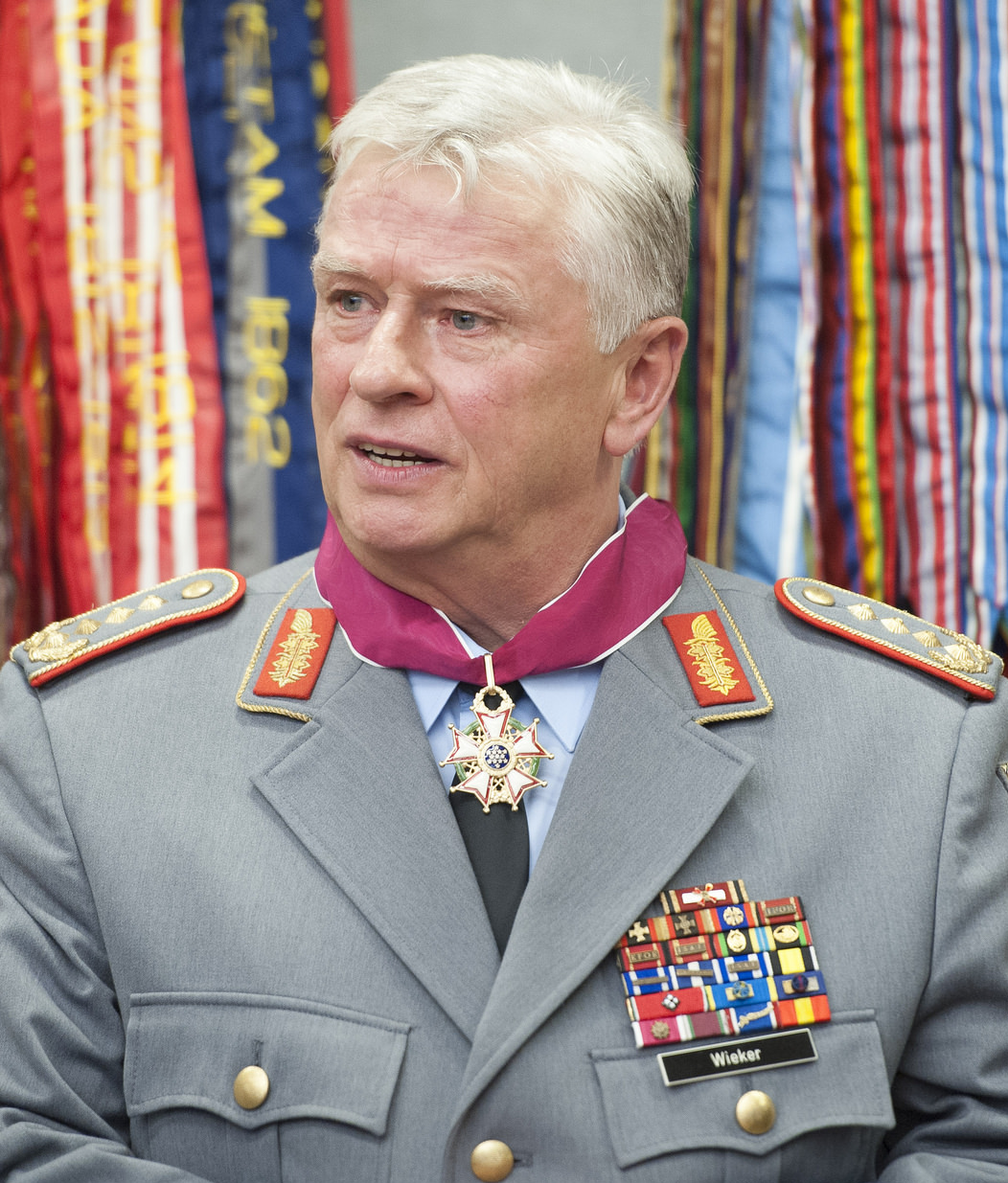
- Wieker being awarded the US Legion of Merit in 2015
- Born: 1 March 1954 (age 72); Delmenhorst, Germany
- Military career
- Allegiance: Germany
- Branch: German Army
- Service years: 1974–2018
- Rank: General
- Commands: Panzerartilleriebataillon 215; Panzergrenadierbrigade 40; 3rd German KFOR Contingent/KFOR MNB South; I. German/Dutch Corps
- Conflicts: IFOR, KFOR, ISAF

Volker Wieker (born 1 March 1954 in Delmenhorst, Lower Saxony) is the former Chief of Staff (Generalinspekteur, lit. Inspector General) of the Bundeswehr, the German armed forces, and a general of the German Army. Trained as an artillery officer, Wieker served in every major foreign Bundeswehr deployment since 1996, including Bosnia, Kosovo and Afghanistan.

== Biography ==
Wieker was born in Delmenhorst and joined the Bundeswehr in 1974 for officer training in the army's artillery branch.

He studied geodesy at the University of the Bundeswehr Munich and served as an officer in an armored artillery battalion in Wildeshausen. He passed his General Staff training at the Führungsakademie der Bundeswehr (Hamburg) in 1989, followed by the US Army's Command and General Staff Officer Course at Fort Leavenworth, Kansas. Upon his return to Germany, he was assigned as the operations officer of an armored brigade in Augustdorf.

Following battalion command with an armored artillery battalion in 1993–96, Wieker was deployed as the operations and training officer for the German Army Contingent IFOR in Bosnia-Herzegovina. Upon his return, he was assigned to the Federal Ministry of Defence (Germany) in Bonn as Military Assistant of the Federal Minister of Defence (1997–1999). In 1999, he led a ministerial task force on the future force structure of the German Army, before taking command of an armored infantry brigade in Schwerin later that year.

From May to December 2001, Wieker deployed to Kosovo as Commander, Multinational Brigade South and Commander of the 3rd German KFOR contingent.

In 2002, he became Chief of Staff of the Army Office in Cologne, followed by chief of staff in the Army Staff in 2004. In July 2008, Wieker took command of the 1st GE/NL Corps in Münster. Since 9 October 2009 Wieker served as Chief of Staff of ISAF in Kabul, Afghanistan.

On 18 December 2009 German Minister of Defence Karl-Theodor zu Guttenberg announced his intention to appoint Wieker chief of staff (Generalinspekteur) of the Bundeswehr. Two days after his promotion to four-star general on 19 January 2010, Wieker was formally appointed Chief of Staff of the Bundeswehr.

Wieker retired on 18 April 2018.

Volker Wieker is married to Sabine. They have two children.

== Awards and decorations ==
- Commander's Cross of the Order of Merit of the Federal Republic of Germany (2014)
- Badge of Honour of the Bundeswehr in Gold (1999)
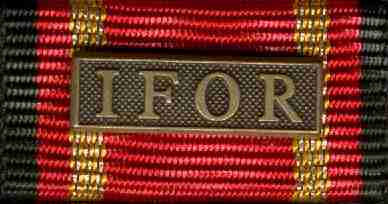
- - Armed Forces Deployment MedalIFOR (1996)
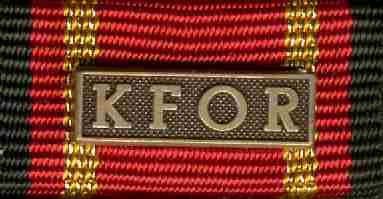
- - Armed Forces Deployment Medal, KFOR (2001)
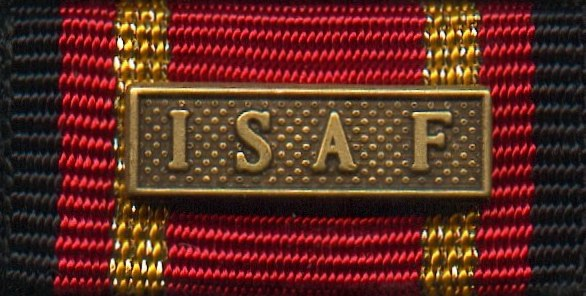
- - Armed Forces Deployment Medal, ISAF (2010)
- - German Sports Badge in Gold
- - NATO Medal, Yugoslavia (1996)
- - NATO Medal, Kosovo (2001)
- - NATO Medal, ISAF (2010)
- - Order For Military Merit (Bulgaria) (2001)
- - Commander with Star of the Order of Merit of the Republic of Hungary (2015)
- - Grand Cross of the Royal Swedish Order of the Polar Star (2013)
- - Royal Norwegian Order of Merit - Commander with Star (2012)
- - Legion of Merit (United States, 2010)
- - Decoration of Merit in Gold (Netherlands, 2011)
- Grand Decoration of Honour in Silver with Star for Services to the Republic of Austria (2015)
- Commander Legion of Merit (United States, 2015) (sea at the picture round his nack)
- Commander of the Legion of Honour (France, 2016)
- Order of Orange-Nassau, Grade: Grand Officer (Netherlands, 2017)
- Order of Merit of the Italian Republic, Grade: Grand Officer (Italy, 2017)
- Joint Commendation Medal (Italy, 2017)
- Cross of Commander of the Order for Merits to Lithuania (Lithuania, 2018)

Military offices
Preceded by Wolfgang Schneiderhan	Chief of Staff of the Federal Armed Forces; 21 January 2010 – 18 April 2018	Succeeded by Eberhard Zorn
