= Flood-Medal 2013 of the State of Lower Saxony =

German award for helpers of 2013 European floods

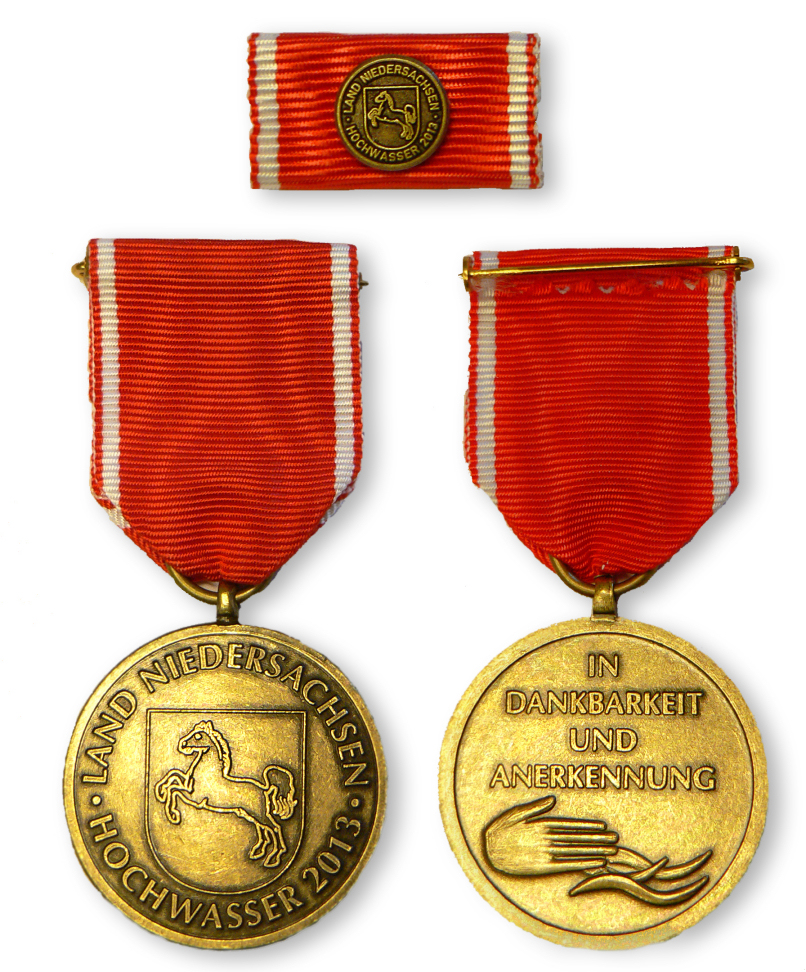
Flood-Medal 2013 of the State of Lower Saxony

The Flood-Medal 2013 of the State of Lower Saxony (German: Hochwassermedaille 2013 des Landes Niedersachsen) was donated in 2013 as federal award by the government of the State of Lower Saxony to honour the help of the numerous relief units and volunteer helpers during the 2013 European Floods who did their duty in the State of Lower Saxony. Helpers and members of the relief units, who did their duty in the beginning of June 2013 in Lower Saxony, where hereby honoured for their engagement.

== Reason ==
Beginning on 25 May 2013 there were heavy rainfalls in Lower Saxony with up to 90 litres per square-meter, which were lasting for several days and induced a regional flood. At first only the river basins of the Aller, Leine, Oker and Weser in the south of Lower Saxony were affected. The rising river stages of these rivers where leading to flood events with many local emergencies in those areas. In the beginning of June 2013 the state of emergency was declared along the Elbe, starting in the district of Lüchow-Dannenberg on 4 June 2013, followed by the district of Lüneburg on 5 June 2013. During the flood more than 20,000 full-time and volunteer members of various rescue units as well as volunteering civilians were on duty.

== Bestowal ==
On 14 October 2013 about 600 helpers where honoured by the prime minister of Lower Saxony Stephan Weil and the minister of interior of Lower Saxony Boris Pistorius in a ceremonial act in Hitzacker for their selfless duty during the flood disaster. Representative of the State Police of Lower Saxony, the Federal Police, the Bundeswehr, the Technisches Hilfswerk, the Fire brigades, the German Red Cross, the Johanniter-Unfall-Hilfe, the Malteser Hilfsdienst as well as the Arbeiter-Samariter-Bund attended the ceremony. On 19 November 2013 there was a second ceremony in the technical central of the Fire Brigade in Groß Düngen for the helpers from the district of Hildesheim and a third one on 20 December 2013 in the technical central of the Fire Brigade in Schiffdorf for the helpers from the district of Cuxhaven. Further medals where handed over during smaller events until the end of 2013.
