= Eberhard Zorn =

German general (born 1960)

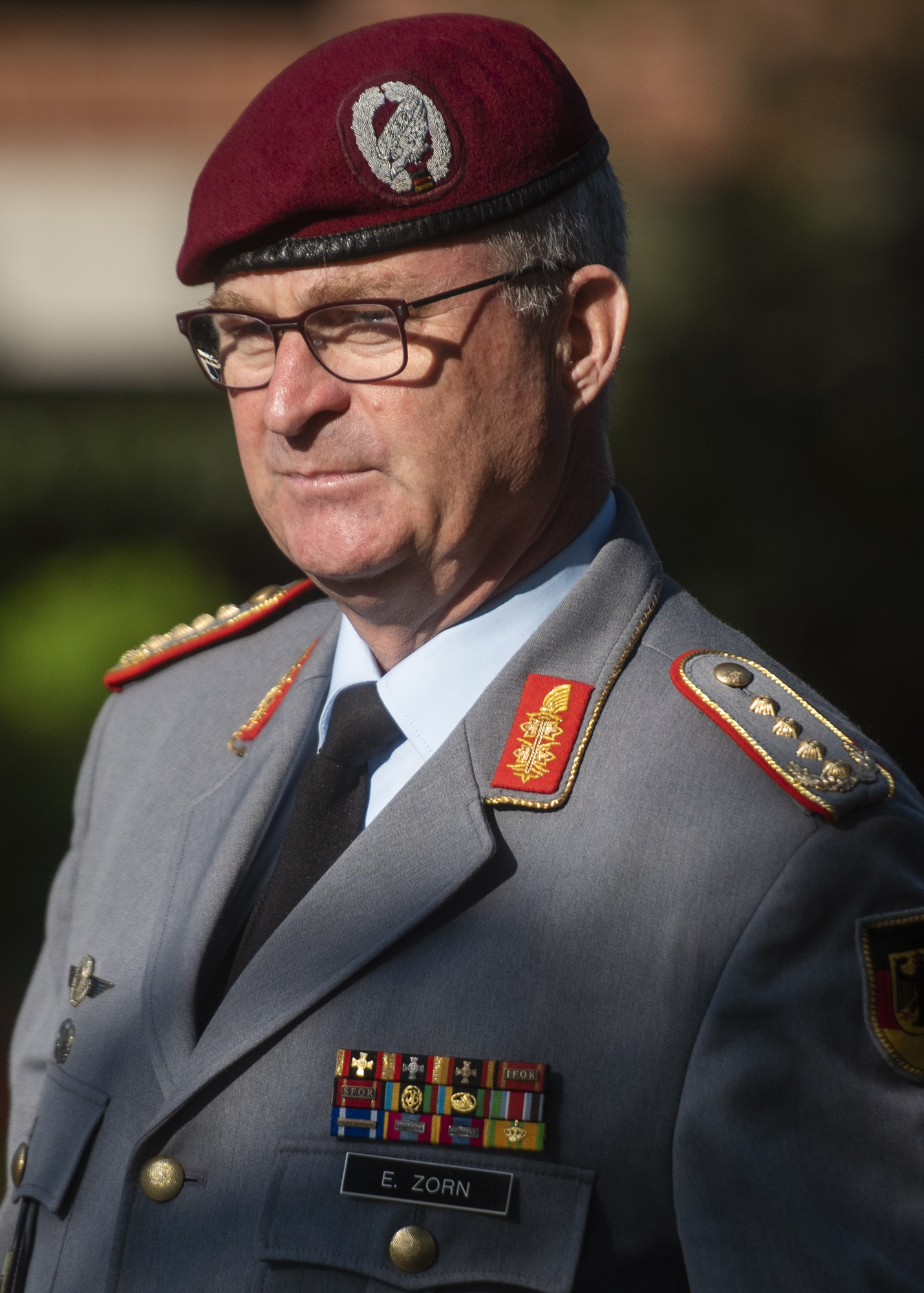
- General Eberhard Zorn
- Born: February 19, 1960 (age 66); Saarbrücken, Saarland, West Germany
- Military career
- Allegiance: Germany
- Branch: German Army
- Service years: 1978–2023
- Rank: General
- Commands: Inspector General of the Bundeswehr; Director-General for Personnel, Ministry of Defence; Commander, Rapid Response Forces Division (DSK); Commander,26th Airborne Brigade; Commander, Field Artillery/ Armored Artillery Battalion 295 (Feld-und Panzerartilleriebataillon 295); Commander, 3rd Battery, Observation Battalion 123
- Conflicts: IFOR, SFOR

Eberhard Zorn visit to Israel, December 2019

Eberhard Zorn (born February 19, 1960) is a retired German general who served as the 16th Inspector General of the Bundeswehr, the German Armed Forces.

== Early life and education ==
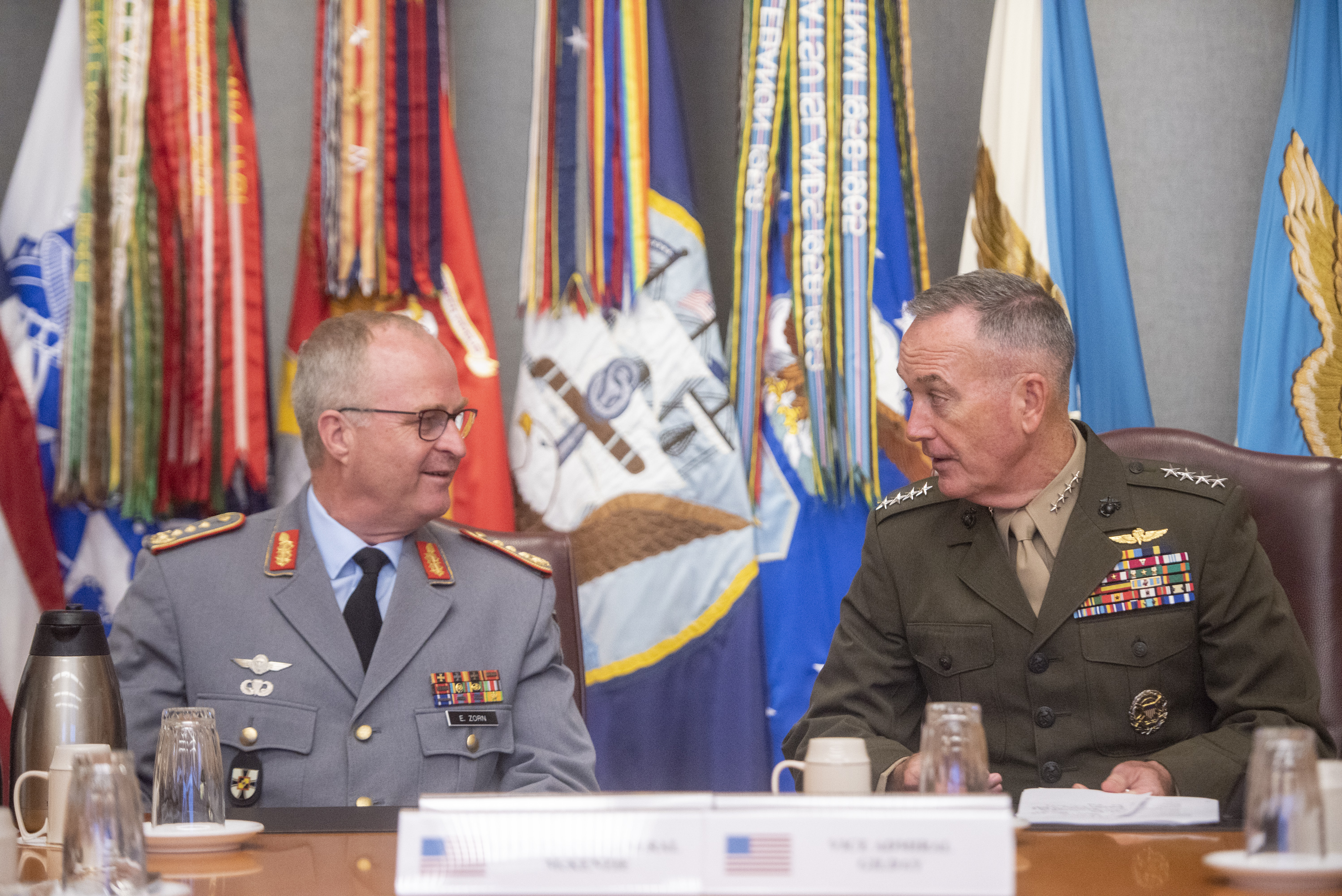
General Eberhard Zorn with General Joseph Dunford during a meeting at The Pentagon

Zorn was born on February 19, 1960, in Saarbrücken, West Germany. He entered the military in 1978 at the Artillery School in Idar-Oberstein, trained as an artillery officer and completed his artillery officer training and course of study in economics and organizational sciences at the University of the Bundeswehr Munich from 1979 to 1983.

== Career ==
Promoted to 1st lieutenant, he was assigned as platoon leader and intelligence officer (S 2), Observation Battalion 103 (Beobachtungsbataillon 103) in Pfullendorf from 1983 to 1987, and became commander of the 3rd Battery, Observation Battalion 123, from 1987 to 1990, promoted as captain, and commander of the fire control and operations and training officer (S 3), Headquarters Artillery Regiment 12, from 1990 to 1991 both in Tauberbischofsheim.

He entered the 34th General Staff Officer Course at the Bundeswehr Command and Staff College in Hamburg from 1991 to 1993 and attended the French General Staff Officer Course (CSEM/CID) in Paris, France, in 1993–1995.

He was assigned in KLK/4th Division in Regensburg as G4 and chief of Materiel Management Section; Deployment abroad as ACOS logistics (G 4); German Army Contingent UNPF/GECONIFOR(L); 1st Contingent, TROGIR operations and training staff officer (G 3) and chief of Administrative Control Section.

In 1997–1999, he was assigned in the operations and personnel staff officer (G 1 Op), German Army Forces Command in Koblenz, became commander, Field Artillery/ Armored Artillery Battalion 295 (Feld- und Panzerartilleriebataillon 295) in Immendingen in 1997–2001, promoted as lieutenant colonel, became assistant chief of branch at the Federal Ministry of Defense, Personnel, Social Services and Central Affairs (PSZ IV 4) Directorate in 2001–2002 and assistant chief of branch personnel, PSZ I 4 in Bonn. He became branch chief plans/operations/organization (G 3) at HQ German Army Forces Command, ACOS Plans/Operations/Organization (G 3) at German Army Forces Command in Koblenz from 2004 to 2007 perspectively, became branch chief Army Staff I 1 (personnel policy matters/leadership development and civic education), in the Ministry of Defence in 2007–2009, and became branch chief Army Staff Z (Central Tasks), Federal Ministry of Defense in Bonn 2009–2010.

He became commander of 26th Airborne Brigade of the Rapid Forces Division in Saarlouis from 2010 to 2012, and was promoted as brigadier general. He also served as the head of personal staff to Chief of Defence in Berlin in 2012–2014. He became the commander of the Rapid Response Forces Division (DSK) in 2014–2015 and was promoted as major general. He became director forces policy, Ministry of Defence, and director-general for personnel, Ministry of Defence in Berlin in 2017–2018 promoted to lieutenant general, before becoming the Inspector General of the Bundeswehr and promoted to general on April 19, 2018.

In 2022, Zorn was Chief of Defence. He was replaced in March 2023, giving way to Carsten Breuer.

== Effective dates of promotion ==
Insignia	Rank	Date
	General	April 2018
	Lieutenant general	October 2015
	Major general	June 2014
	Brigadier general	January 2010
	Colonel	2005
	Lieutenant colonel	1999
	Major	1993
	Captain	1987
	1st lieutenant	1983

== Awards ==
- – Gold Cross of Honour
- – Silver Cross of Honour
- – Bronze Cross of Honour
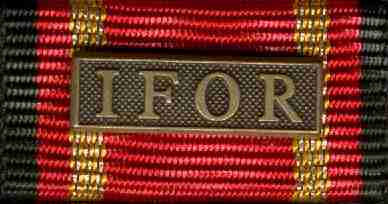
- – Armed Forces Deployment Medal, IFOR
- – Armed Forces Deployment Medal, SFOR
- – German Sports Badge
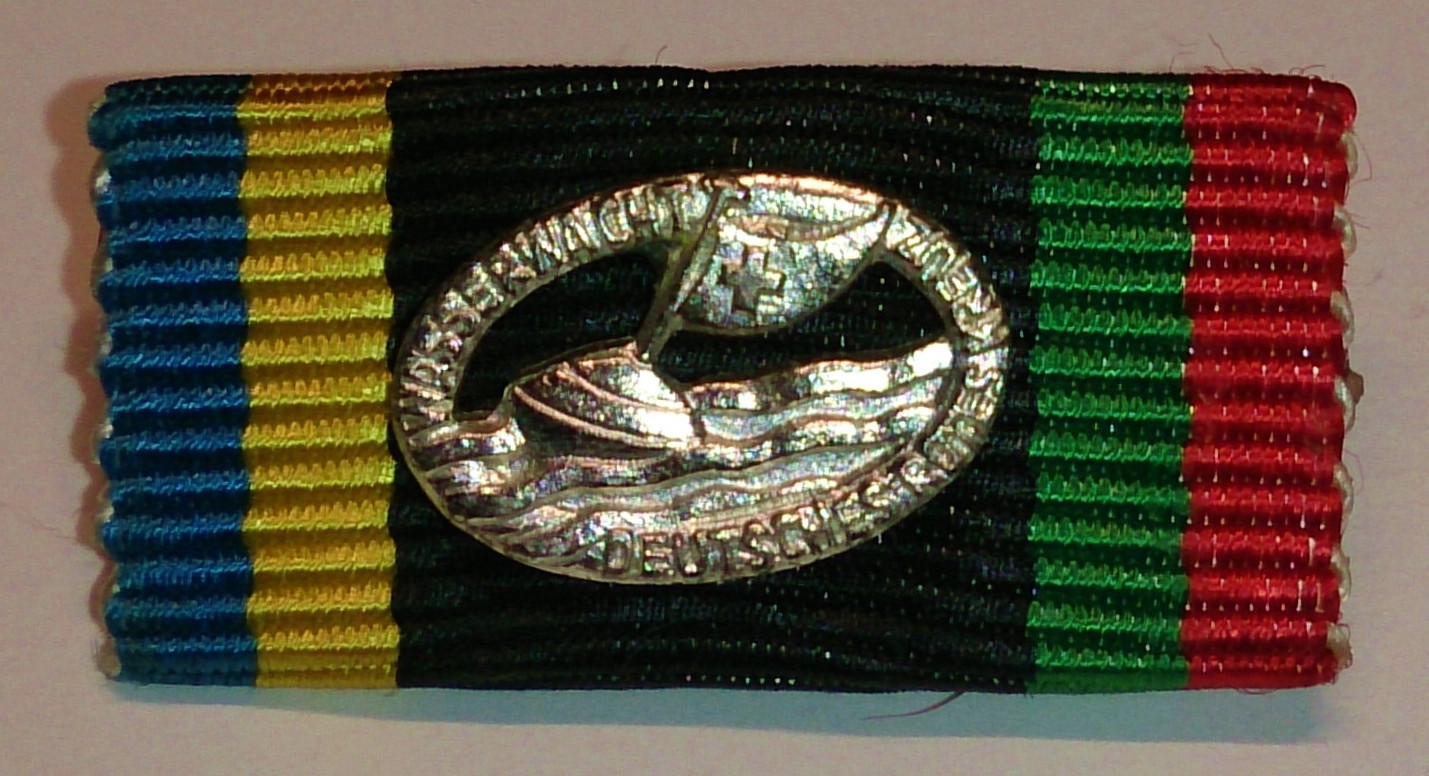
- – German rescue swimming badge
- – United Nations Medal for UNPROFOR
- – NATO medal for the former Yugoslavia
- – Officier, Legion of Honour
- – National Defence Medal, clasp: 'Corps Européen' (France)
- – National Defence Medal, clasp: 'Artillerie' (France)
- – Commander, Order of Merit of the Grand Duchy of Luxembourg
- – Cross for the Four Day Marches (Netherlands)
- US Parachutist Badge
- German Silver Parachutist Badge

Military offices
Preceded by Volker Wieker	Chief of Staff of the Federal Armed Forces; 19 April 2018–16 March 2023	Succeeded by Carsten Breuer
