= Munster, Lower Saxony =

Munster (Örtze)
- Town
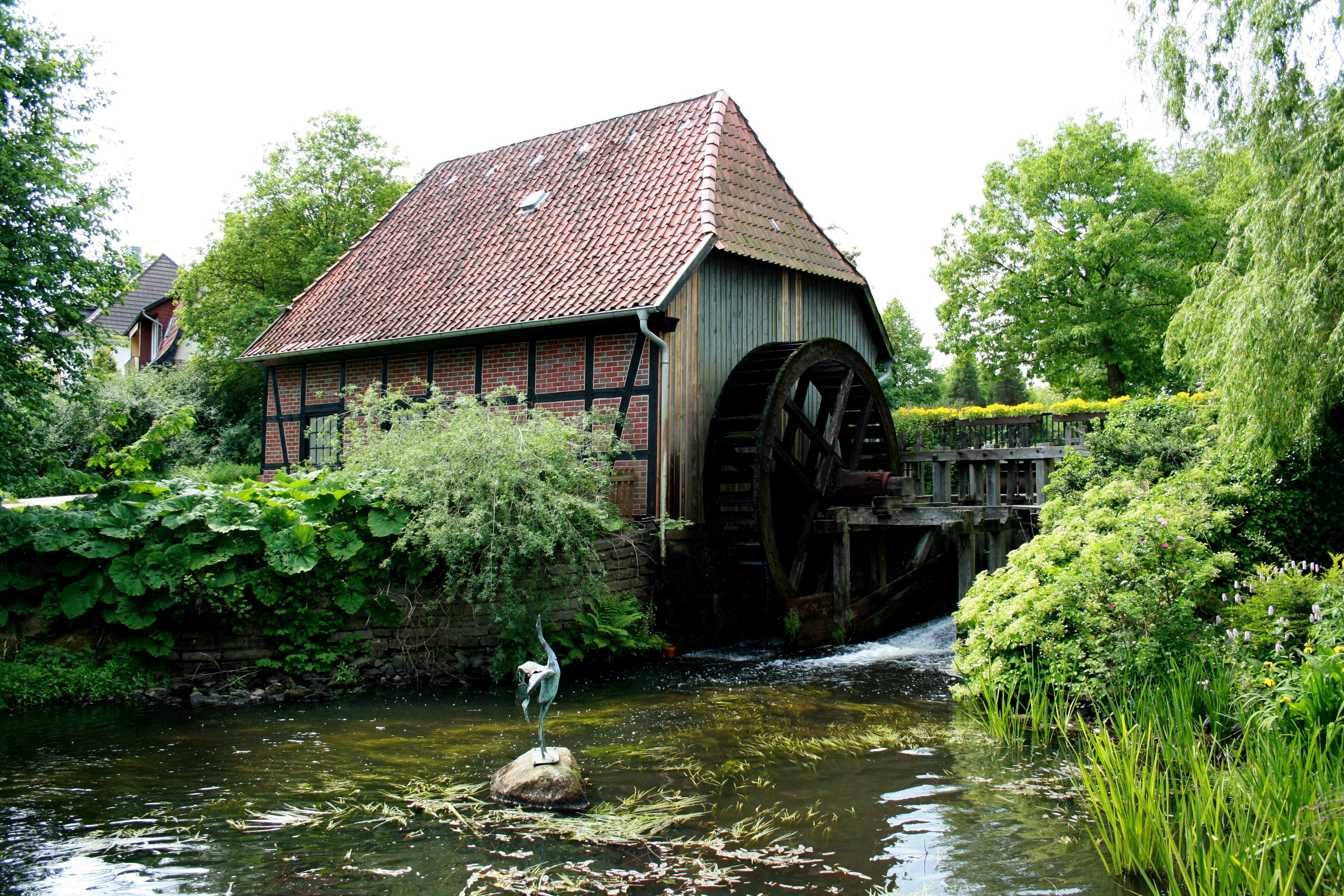
- Water mill in Munster

- Flag Coat of arms

- Location of Munster (Örtze) within Heidekreis district
- Interactive map of Munster (Örtze)
- Location within Germany Location within Lower Saxony
- Coordinates: 52°59′19″N 10°05′28″E
- Country: Germany
- State: Lower Saxony
- District: Heidekreis

Government
  - Mayor (2021–26): Ulf-Marcus Grube (CDU)

Area
  - Total: 194.52 km^{2} (75.10 sq mi)
- Elevation: 73 m (240 ft)

Population (2025-12-31)
  - Total: 15,146
  - Density: 77.863/km^{2} (201.67/sq mi)
- Time zone: UTC+01:00 (CET)
  - Summer (DST): UTC+02:00 (CEST)
- Postal codes: 29633
- Dialling codes: 05192
- Vehicle registration: HK, SFA
- Website: www.munster.de/home.aspx

Munster (German pronunciation: [ˈmʊnstɐ]; West Low German: Munste), also called Munster (Örtze) or formerly Munsterlager, is a small town in the district of Heidekreis, in Lower Saxony, Germany almost equidistant from Hamburg and Hanover. The town is home to the German Army's largest garrison and is situated between the two training areas of Munster North and Munster South. It is also the fourth largest garrison in the German Armed Forces. The German Chemical Defence Research Establishment (Wehrwissenschaftliches Institut für Schutztechnologien – ABC-Schutz) and the Society for the disposal of chemical warfare agents and old armaments GmbH (Ltd.) (GEKA) are located in Munster.

Soldiers and other government employees make up the majority of its population, and the surrounding military zones restrict the town's growth, retaining its rural character.

== Geography ==
Munster is situated in the central Lüneburg Heath region along the river Örtze between the towns of Soltau and Uelzen. The Munster military training areas, representing nearly 50% of the city's total area, are reserved for military use. Due to restricted access to the surrounding areas, many rare species and habitats can be found in this region. The region's populations of rare species have been previously drawn upon to restore populations in other regions where such species are endangered.

== History ==
The first recorded mention of Munster was in 1252. An Imperial German battalion under the command of future President of the German Reich Paul von Hindenburg started the use of this area as a training ground in 1893. The Bundeswehr re-opened its garrison in Munster in 1956 which was expanded in 1990, and again during the transformation process of the Bundeswehr. Today, Munster is the largest garrison of the German Army. Between 1950 - 1984 part of the garrison became a British Army base, Dennis Barracks.

In 1916, the German Empire opened Gasplatz Breloh ("Breloh Gas Facility"), an area dedicated to research in and production of chemical weapons. After World War I, the site was closed and the ammunition stored there was removed. In the process of this removal, a whole train of chemical munitions blew up in 1919, the reasons for this disaster never being uncovered. In 1935, the Third Reich reopened the site as an experimental research and production area as well as a bombing range for chemical ammunitions under the name Heeresnebelfüllstelle Raubkammer ("Army fog-filling plant, Raubkammer"), "fog" being used as a synonym for chemical agents. Over the course of World War II, large quantities of sulphur mustard gas and the new nerve agent, GA, were produced here. At the end of the war, Germany had a continuous production line for GB nerve agent ready to go online; this plant was dismantled by the British Occupation Forces and later shipped to Porton Down, Great Britain.

In 1958, the German Bundeswehr founded in the area a new agency dedicated to the defence against NBC weapons. As of 2009, this agency has the name "Wehrwissenschaftliches Institut für Schutztechnologien - ABC-Schutz" (WIS)("Bundeswehr Research Institute for Protective Technologies and NBC Protection")

== Politics ==
Munster is traditionally held by a CDU majority.

=== Mayors ===
The mayor of Munster is Ulf-Marcus Grube (CDU), elected in September 2021. He succeeded Christina Fleckenstein (SPD), who was elected in May 2014 with 54,7 % of the votes. Her predecessor was Adolf Köthe (independent).

=== Town council ===
- CDU 13 seats
- SPD 10 seats
- FDP 1 seat
- NPD 1 seat
- Independent 1 seat

(as of September 2011)

=== Coat of arms ===
The Oberpräsident of the Province of Hanover awarded the then municipality of Munster, in a decree of 4 March 1937, a coat of arms. The coat of arms displayed on a gold field a blue dragon with red claws breathing red fire; above it lay a horizontal silver sword on a blue field. As a result of a petition by the council of the municipality of Munster of 18 April 1967 the District President (Regierungspräsident) in Lüneburg on 17 May 1967, authorised the field of the 1937 coat of arms to be changed from gold to silver and further authorised a town flag in the colours blue and white to be used.

== Twin towns — sister cities ==
Munster is twinned with:

- Radcliff, Kentucky, United States, since 1984
- Michurinsk, Russia, since 1991
- Éragny, France, since 1999
- Muggiò, Italy, since 2019

== Main sights ==
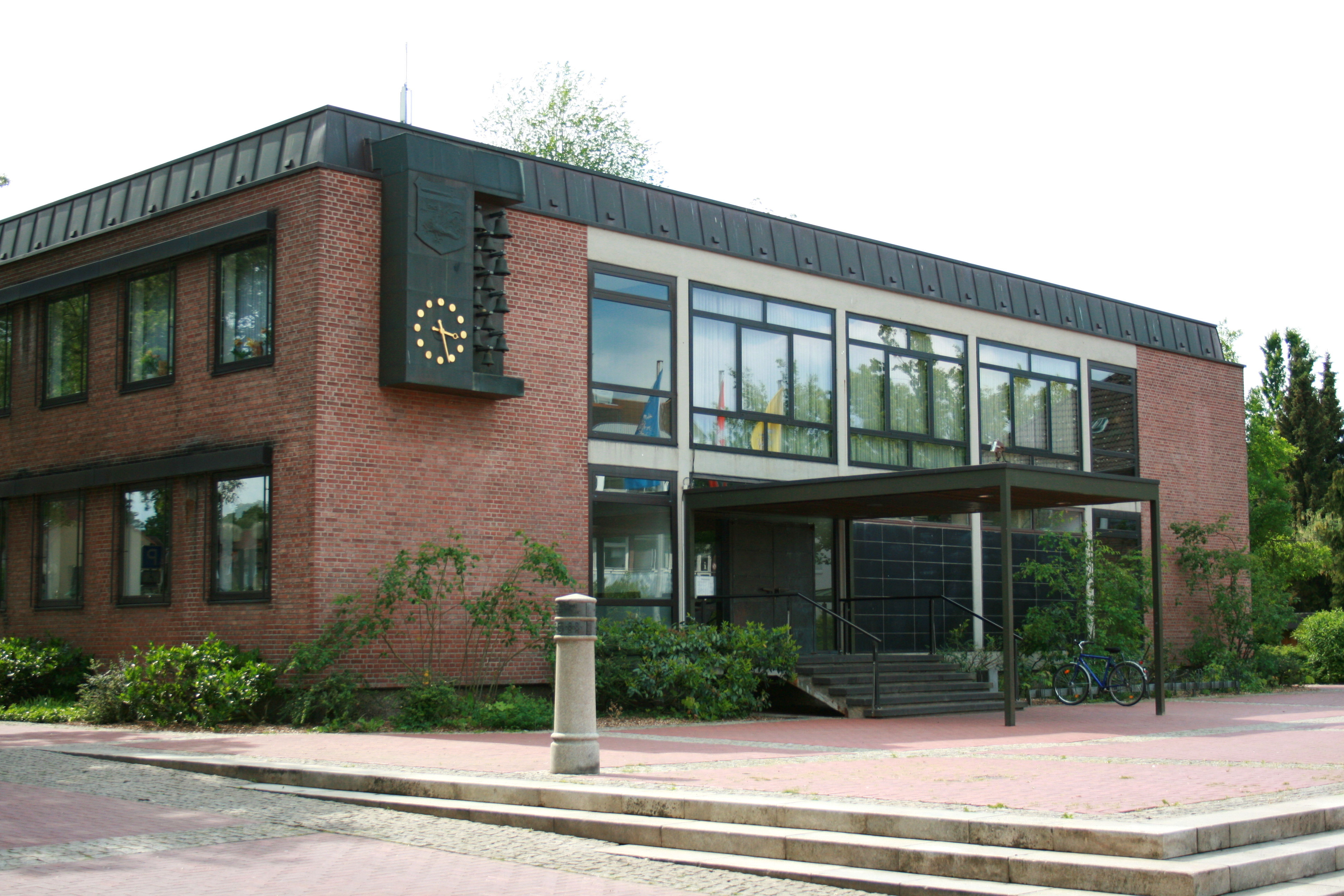
Town hall

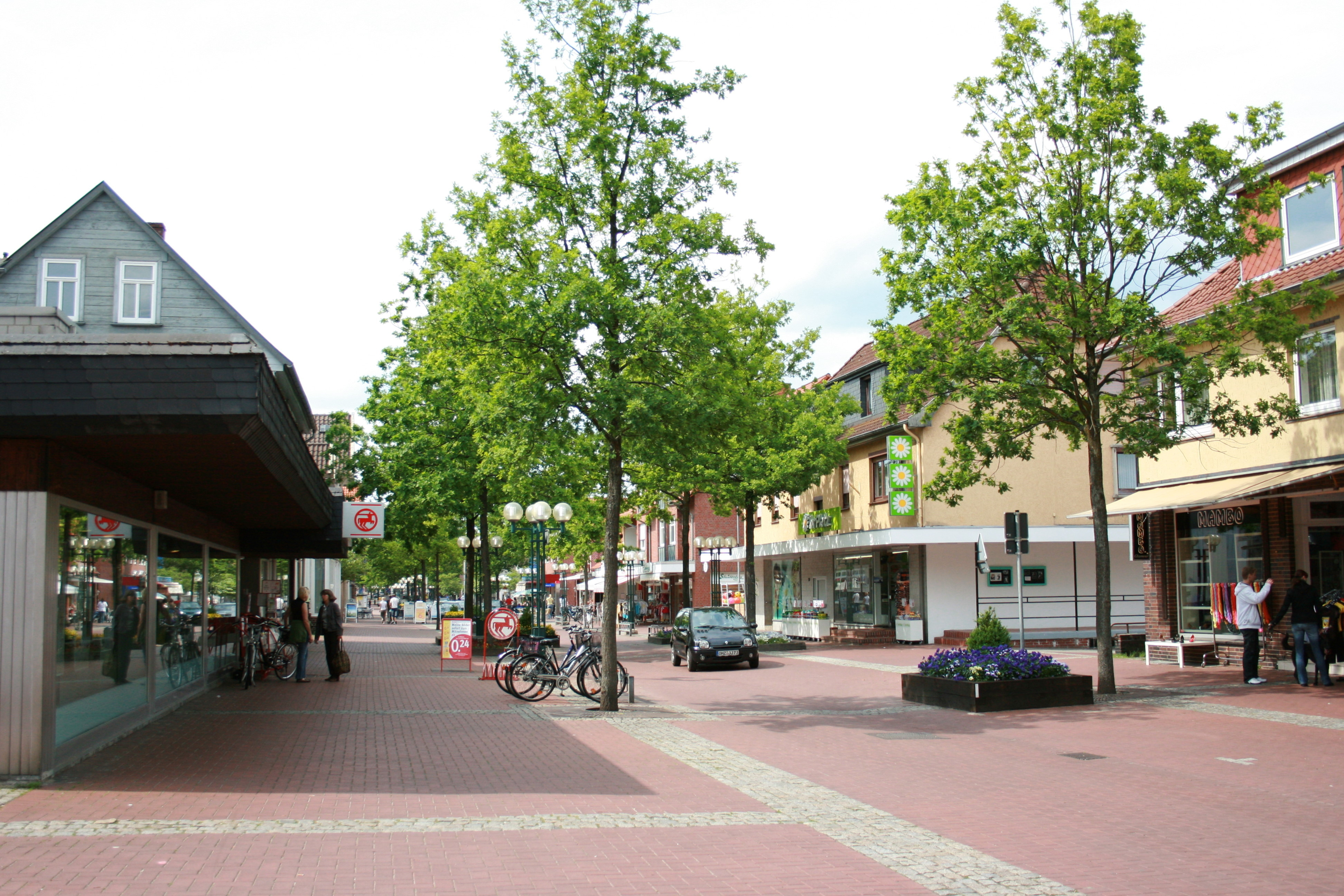
Wilhelm-Bockelmann-Straße, the main shopping street

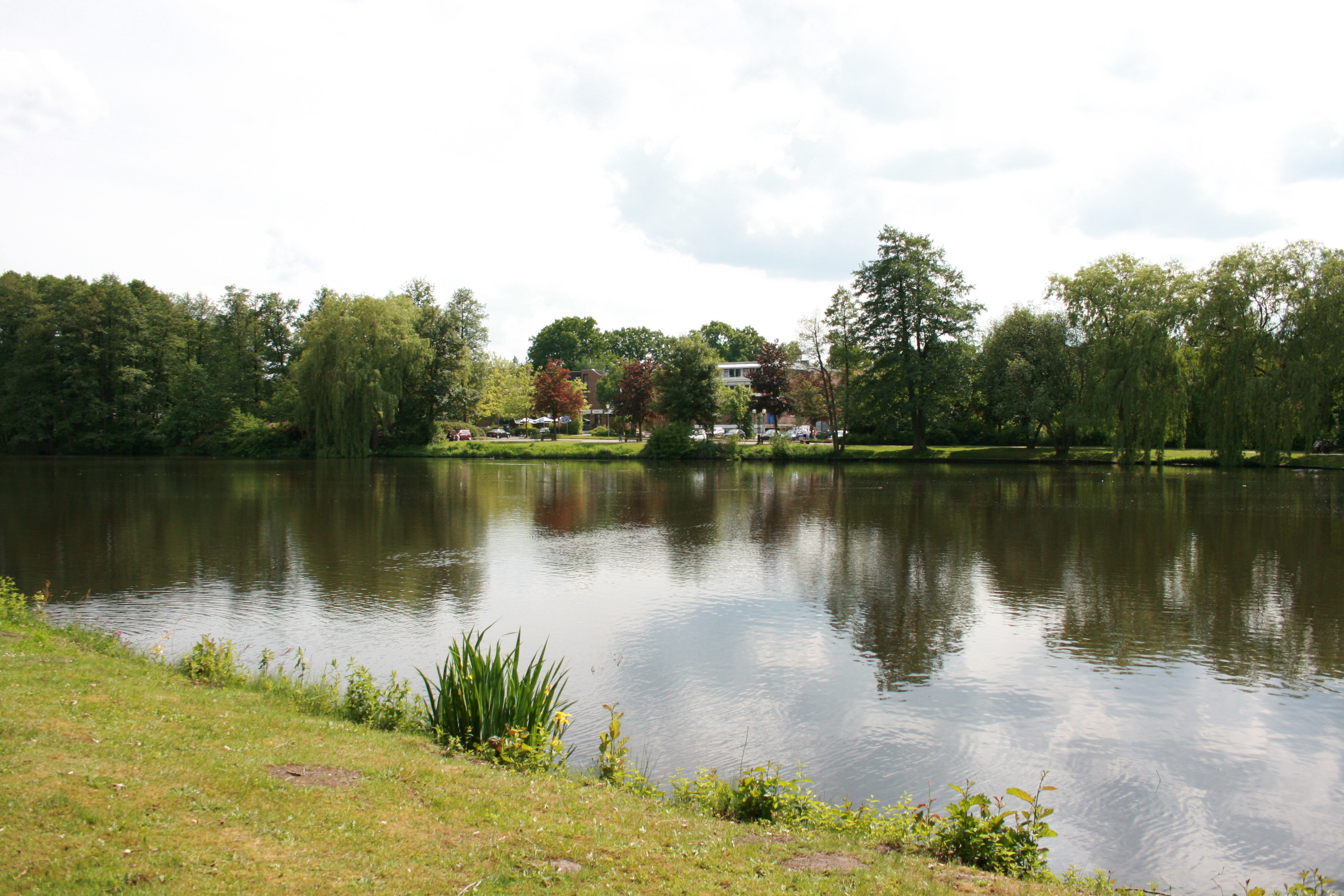
Millpond on the Örtze near the town centre

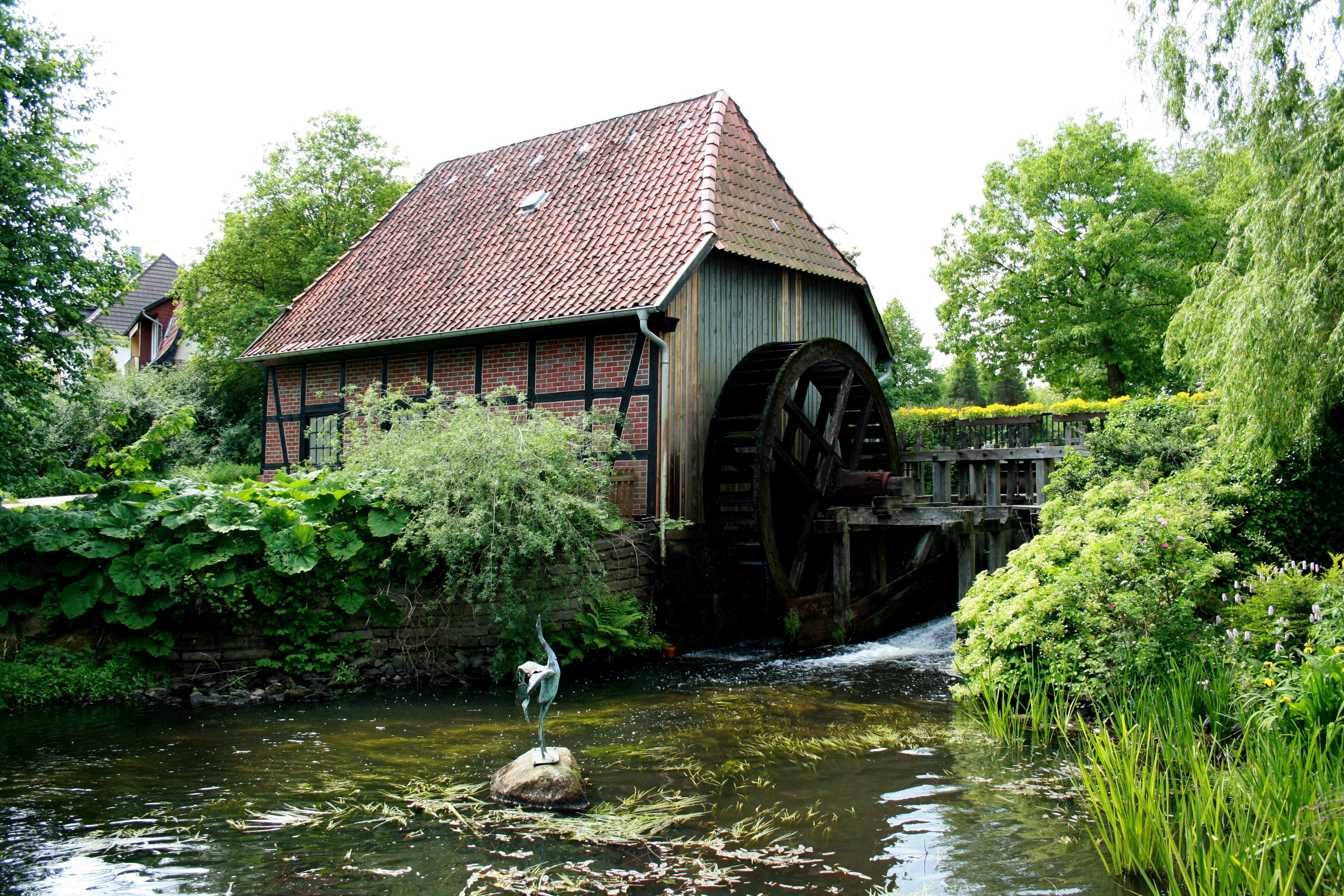
Munster watermill

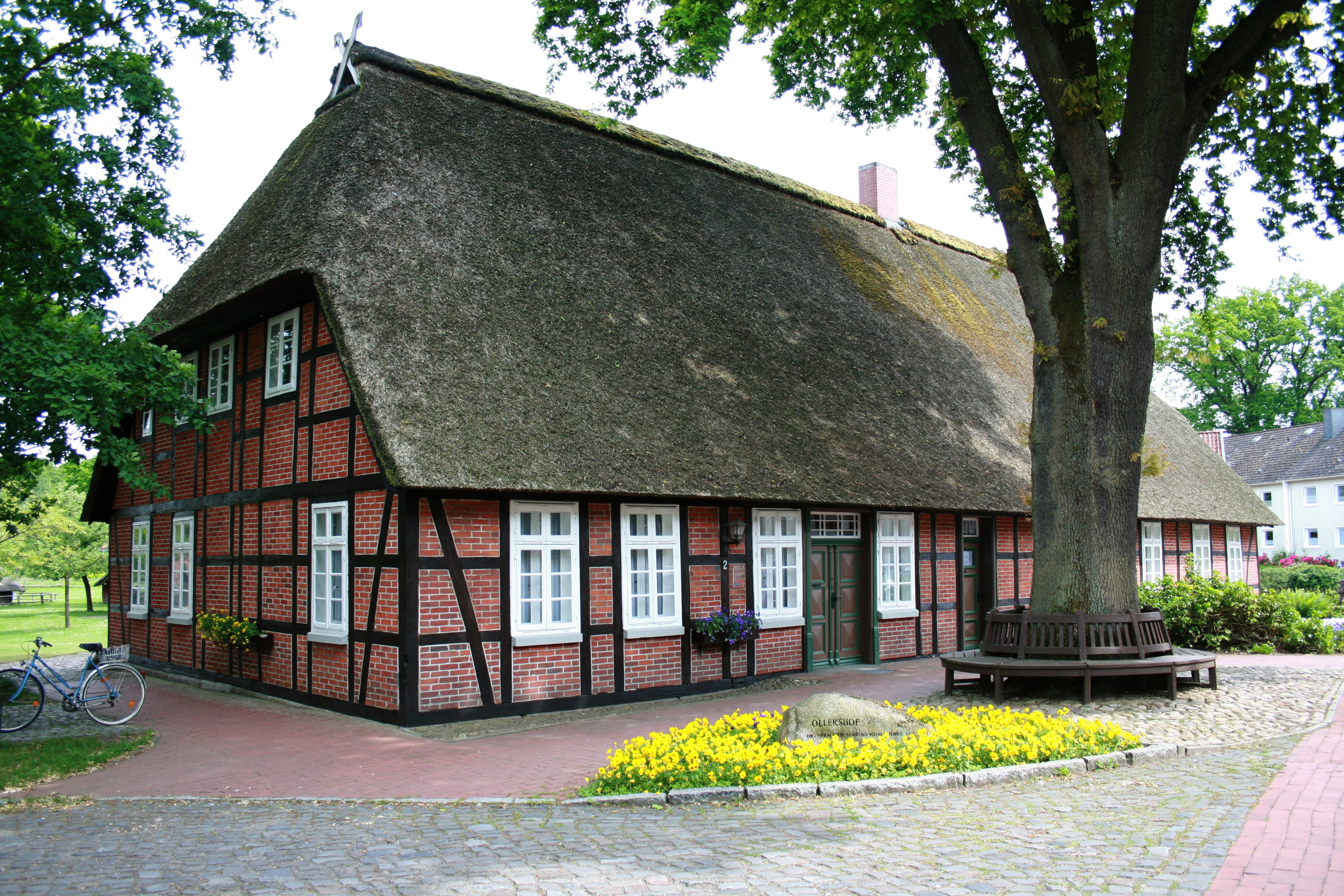
Main house of the Ollershof farm

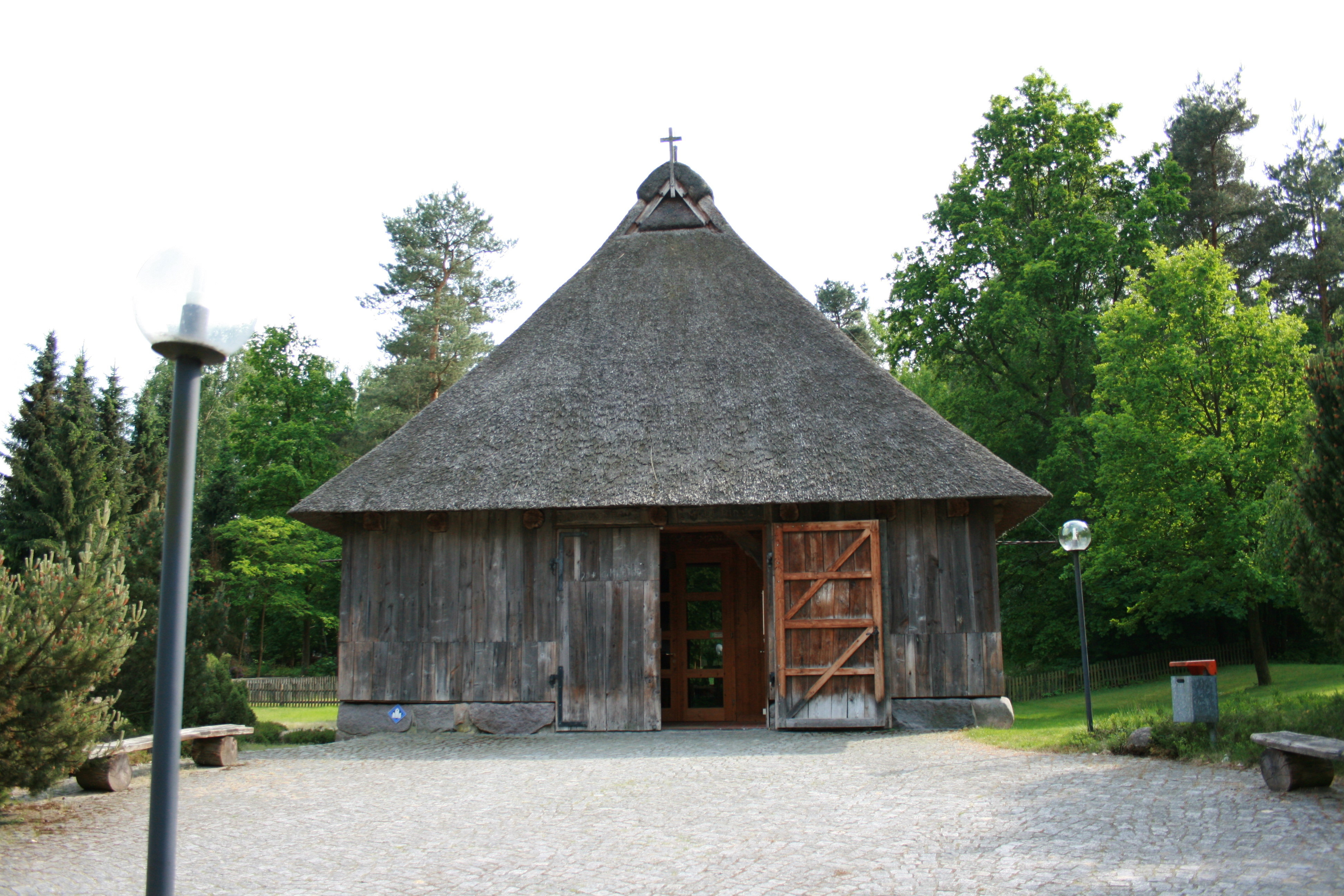
St Martin's sheep pen church

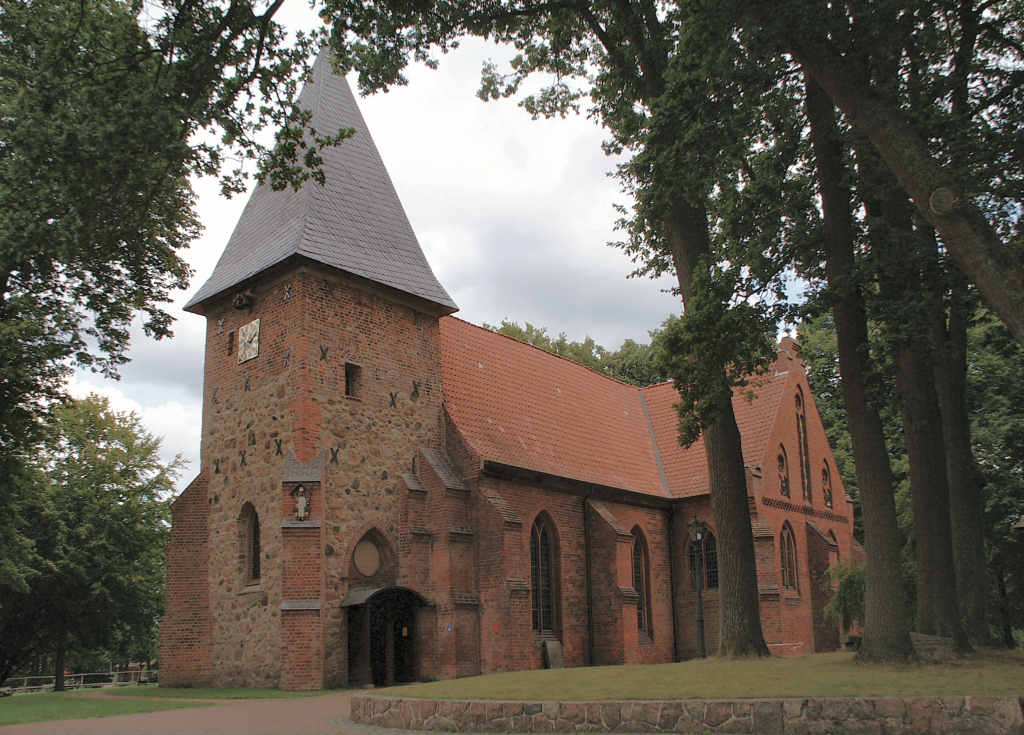
St Urban's Church

- German Tank Museum, (Deutsches Panzermuseum) – Germany's largest armoured fighting vehicle museum
- St. Urban's Church (St.-Urbani-Kirche) – a 13th-century church
- The Ollershof is a free open-air museum
- St Martin's Church, Munster is an old sheep pen that was converted to a church
- Town library
- St. Stephen's Military Church (St.-Stephanus-Militärkirche) – the only church entirely allocated to a military parish in Germany and the highest building in Munster
- Lower Saxony Spring (Niedersachsenbrunnen) – with 8 horses, that symbolise the formerly independent parishes in the borough, by Jos Pirkner (1991)

== Economy ==
The largest economic factor and employer in Munster is the Bundeswehr. Firms of trans-regional significance are Meyer Breloh (construction materials and windows) and Abels Consulting and Technology. Munster lies on the B 71 federal road between Soltau and Uelzen, not far from the A 7 motorway. The most important public transport link to Bremen, Hamburg and Hanover is Munster station on the old Uelzen–Langwedel railway, that originally ran as the America Line from Berlin via Uelzen to Bremen and Bremerhaven. Today regional trains work the line from Bremen via Soltau to Uelzen. Long distance trains (IC) trains only run on Fridays and Sundays from Berlin and are geared predominantly to commuting Bundeswehr soldiers. An Intercity link from Magdeburg used to run nightly from Sunday to Monday until the timetable change on 9 December 2007.

== Education ==
Since 2008/09 Munster has had 2 primary schools, a special needs school that focusses on learning support, a secondary modern school, a middle school and a grammar school. The old Breloh Primary School (Breloh is a suburb of Munster) has become a satellite of Am Süllberg Primary School in the Örtze valley due to the dwindling number of pupils.

== Military ==
Munster is the fourth largest garrison in the Bundeswehr. Since 2007, in the wake of the transformation of the Bundeswehr, 6,675 soldiers and their families have been stationed in Munster. Together with the trainees at the training centre there is a total of about 10,000 soldiers. Munster is often called the "showcase of the German Army" due to the training centre, the many training demonstrations - some open to the public - and the testing of new equipment and new tactics.

Since 2006 three battalions of officer cadets have been subordinated to the Munster Training Centre. In the course of Bundeswehr transformation the basic training for all officer cadets was centralised so that one third are now trained in Munster.

== Chemical contamination ==
During the First World War the German military tested chemical warfare agents on the Gasplatz Breloh. These were first deployed operationally in 1915 on the Western Front. In October 1919 during disarmament activity after the end of the war a goods train laden with weapons exploded. With the establishment of the Raubkammer Military Testing Site (Heeresversuchsstelle Raubkammer) at Munster North Training Area, the Wehrmacht started testing chemical weapons again in 1935 and ran a pilot site for the production of Tabun and Sarin. After the Second World War these facilities were blown up by the British forces; this however led to contamination. After the Bundeswehr took over Munster North Training Area, a testing facility for NBC defence was established from which the Wehrwissenschaftliches Institut für Schutztechnologien – ABC-Schutz emerged. Since 1982 the WWD has operated an incineration site for the disposal of the large amount of contamination that resulted from the work on chemical weapons. Since 17 December 1997 the operation of this and a second incineration site has been organised by Gesellschaft zur Entsorgung chemischer Kampfstoffe und Rüstungs-Altlasten (GEKA mbH), a company under private law that is 100 percent owned by the Federation. These facilities are certified by international arms control treaties.

== Personalities ==
- Clemens Neuhaus (1927–1991), a painter specialising in motifs of the Lüneburg Heath
- Marcus Wedau (born 1975), football player, among others for KFC Uerdingen 05 and MSV Duisburg
- Lars Klingbeil (born 1978), politician (SPD), Member of the Bundestag in 2005 and since 2009
