= Intervention forces =

The intervention forces (German: Eingreifkräfte or EK) are one of the three categories of force within the German Armed Forces (Bundeswehr), the others being stabilisation forces and support forces. The formations within the intervention forces which have a total of 35,000 soldiers are primarily intended for crisis intervention and provide the German contributions to the intervention forces such as the NATO Response Force and the forces for rescue and evacuation operations that are fundamentally a national responsibility.

== Order of battle ==
=== Army ===
The German Army provides the largest contingent of intervention forces with 20,700 soldiers. The main component of these forces is the 1st Panzer Division, which is distinguished from other "normal" Army divisions by a multitude of permanently assigned divisional combat support troops. The forces that are placed on readiness by the Army are capable of executing combined arms operations at the divisional level. Also in the intervention forces are parts of the Special Operations Division and Airmobile Operations Division, which enhance the flexibility of the intervention forces as a result of their ability to execute airmobile operations. The following formations are grouped under the intervention forces along with almost all their subordinate units:

- 1st Armoured Division (also: "Intervention Force Division")
  - All intervention forces except 3rd Logistic Battalion (stabilisation forces)
  - All intervention forces except 1st Engineer Battalion (both stabilisation and intervention) and the 130th Heavy Engineer Battalion 130 (both) of 100 Engineer Regiment (the regiment deployed on operations leads the intervention/stabilisation divisional engineers on intervention missions.)
- Franco-German Brigade (German element)
  - All German elements are intervention
- 100th Airborne Air Defence Battery (Seedorf)
- 26th Airmobile Brigade of the Special Operations Division
  - All intervention forces except 262 Airborne Support Battalion (stabilisation forces)

The following formations are mixed intervention/stabilisation forces, that are partly classified as stabilisation forces. These are thus intended both for intervention as well as peacekeeping missions and only specified company detachments are available for intervention missions:

- 1st Engineer Battalion and 130th Heavy Engineer Battalion of 100 Engineer Regiment in 1st Armoured Division
- Special Forces Command of the Special Operations Division
- 15th Medium Transport Helicopter Regiment of the Airmobile Operations Division (to be disbanded)
- 25th Medium Transport Helicopter Regiment of the Airmobile Operations Division (disbanded and re-established as Helicopter Wing 64)
- 1st Airmobile Brigade of Airmobile Operations Division
  - All intervention/stabilisation forces apart from 1st Army Aviation Support Squadron and 1st Army Aviation Maintenance Squadron (both stabilisation)

Note: The list does not reflect the regular ORBAT of the Army, but only a list of the intervention forces of the Army. For the exact formation organisations and structures please following the links.

=== Air Force ===
The German Air Force has - following a modular approach - laid down the percentage of all formations that are assigned to the three categories of force. All combat and air transport formations make a contribution to both intervention and stabilisation forces.

=== Navy ===
In the German Navy it is intended to have two crews for the new frigates of Type F125 that will replace the old guided missile frigates of Type F122. In this way the ships will be able to spend longer on station in foreign waters. Based on the American prototype the crews will rotate on a specified cycle. In addition, unlike the Army, little is known about the composition of intervention forces in the Navy.

=== Streitkräftebasis ===
- 1st Logistic Brigade, Delmenhorst
  - Staff and HQ Company, Delmenhorst
  - 161st Logistic Battalion, Delmenhorst

For intervention operations the 1st Logistic Brigade commands the 161st Logistic Battalion which supports the combat logistics, e.g. the logistic battalions of the Army's brigades. The battalion thus plugs the gap between the static logistic bases in Germany and the combat logistic units. In Swiss military parlance this part of the logistic chain is described as "mobile Logistik" or mobile logistics, which is a very apt description.

== See also ==
- Army Forces Command
- German Navy
