= 9th Panzerlehr Brigade =

Coordinates: 52.985108°N 10.071745°E

- Panzerlehrbrigade 9
- Coat of Arms
- Active: 1 June 1958 – present
- Country: Germany
- Branch: German Army
- Type: heavy forces Panzer
- Size: ~6,000 men
- Part of: 1st Panzer Division
- Locations: Munster (HQ location); Neustadt am Rübenberge

Commanders
- Current commander: Brigadegeneral Lutz Kuhn

Insignia
NATO Map Symbol
9
1

The 9th Panzerlehr Brigade (German: Panzerlehrbrigade 9, abbreviated PzLehrBrig 9) is a formation of about 6,000 men strong within the German Armed Forces or Bundeswehr, which is subordinated to the 1st Panzer Division in Oldenburg. The bulk of the brigade is stationed in Munster. Two battalions are based in Neustadt am Rübenberge. The brigade has become the "showcase of the German Army" as a result of its German Army Combat Vehicle and Aircraft Demonstration Exercises (German: Informationslehrübung Gefechts- und Luftfahrzeuge des Deutschen Heeres) which it has conducted for decades. These exercises demonstrate the capability of the Army's fighting vehicles and aircraft and how they operate jointly in various scenarios. The formation is classified as an armoured brigade within the Bundeswehr's heavy forces.

== Mission ==
As part of the intervention forces the brigade plans and carries out missions involving networked, multinational, combined arms, high intensity warfare operations. In addition it plans, prepares and executes tasks in the low to medium intensity part of the spectrum of operations i.e. it provides and reinforces stabilisation forces. The brigade is capable of leading combined arms operations in a multinational and joint environment under the direction of a divisional command, in mobile and networked operations. To do so its main weapon systems are the Leopard 2 Mark A6, main battle tank, the Marder infantry fighting vehicle and the PzH 2000 howitzer. The Marders will soon be replaced by the Puma which is already being put through its paces in the 92nd Panzergrenadier (Lehr) Battalion, which forms part of the brigade.

As a training force, the brigade supports the career-linked training associated with the leadership development of armoured combat units through numerous training exercises, as well as training the Bundeswehr's Staff College, the Army Officer Training School and other arms schools. The brigade demonstrates the appropriate official procedures in a rigorous and methodical way, from the handling of combat materiel to the combined arms live-firing at reinforced battle group level. As well as supporting the Armoured Warfare School with demonstration exercises, 9th Panzerlehr Brigade is also involved in the development of armoured warfare concepts and tries out new weapons systems, equipment and tactics as a trials brigade.

== Formation sign and shoulder flashes ==
The brigade's formation sign displays the white Saxon stallion on a red background mounted on the white-bordered, yellow and white coat of arms. The horse recalls the dukes of the House of Welf and the Kingdom of Hanover. The original Saxon emblem was adopted by the Welf dukes, from 1235 titled the dukes of Brunswick-Lüneburg, as an additional coat of arms. As a result of the unification of part of the Lüneburg-Brunswick region with the principality and, later, Kingdom of Hanover, the Saxon stallion was adopted in 1705 by the kingdom on its inescutcheon, the main shield being divided vertically into yellow and white halves. With the founding of Lower Saxony the Saxon stallion on a red shield has been the insignia of the state since 1952. Not until 2006 did the brigade adopt this coat of arms for reasons of tradition. It was the insignia of the 1st Panzergrenadier Brigade which was taken out of service at the end of 2007, and whose former subordinate units, 33rd Panzer Battalion and 141st Logistic Battalion, joined the 9th Panzerlehr Brigade. In addition the shield is identical with the formation sign of the 1st Panzer Division apart from the white border. The old formation sign until 2006 displayed two crossed swords and an L for Lehrbrigade on a red background with a red border. This was identical with the sign of the Armoured Corps Training Centre apart from the substitution of the letter "S" with the letter "L". The President of Germany conferred the arm band of 9th Panzerlehr Brigade on 24 September 1987 as a visible sign of the recognition it was due.

== Organization ==
As of 1 March 2025 the brigade is organized as follows:

- Panzerlehr Brigade 9 (Panzerlehrbrigade 9), in Munster
  - Staff and Signal Company Panzerlehr Brigade 9 (Stabs- und Fernmeldekompanie Panzerlehr Brigade 9), in Munster
  - Reconnaissance Lehr Battalion 3 (Aufklärungslehrbataillon 3), in Lüneburg with Fennek reconnaissance vehicles and KZO drones
  - Panzergrenadier Battalion 33 (Panzergrenadierbataillon 33), in Neustadt am Rübenberge with 44x Puma infantry fighting vehicles
  - Panzergrenadier Lehr Battalion 92 (Panzergrenadierlehrbataillon 92), in Munster with 44x Puma infantry fighting vehicles
  - Panzer Lehr Battalion 93 (Panzerlehrbataillon 93), in Munster with 44x Leopard 2A6 main battle tanks
  - German/British Bridging Engineer Battalion 130 (Deutsch/Britische Pionierbrückenbataillon 130), in Minden
  - Supply Battalion 141 (Versorgungsbataillon 141), in Neustadt am Rübenberge

=== Former units ===
- 96th Logistic Battalion (disbanded 31 March 1971)
- 91st and 94th Panzerlehr Battalions (disbanded 30 October 1992)
- 332nd Panzergrenadier (Lehr) Battalion (transferred 31 December 1996, disbanded 30 June 2006)
- 11th Panzer Reconnaissance (Lehr) Battalion (disbanded 31 March 1997)
- 91st Jäger Battalion (transferred to 21st Panzer Brigade on 1 April 2023)
- 95th Panzerartillerie (Lehr) Battalion (disbanded 30 September 2002)
- 3rd Panzer Reconnaissance (Lehr) Battalion (transferred 30 June 2003)
- 6th Panzer Mortar Company/92nd Panzergrenadier (Lehr) Battalion (disbanded 21 October 2005)
- 334th "Celle" Panzerlehr Battalion (disbanded 30 June 2006)
- 90th Panzerjäger (Lehr) Company (disbanded 30 September 1996)
- 90th Logistic (Lehr) Company
- 90th Maintenance (Lehr) Company (disbanded 31 March 1994)
- 90th Medical (Lehr) Company, later 4th Company/3rd Medical Battalion (disbanded)
- 90th NBC (Lehr) Company (disbanded)

== History ==
=== Beginnings ===
The first demonstration battalion in the Bundeswehr was established in Munster Camp in 1956. The district administrator, Karl-Theodor Molinari, and a doctor, Dr. Hermann Wulf, gave up their professions to serve as commanders of the new tank (Panzerlehrbataillon) and armoured infantry (Panzergrenadierlehrbataillon) demonstration battalions. A total of 71 volunteers, mostly World War II veterans, were stationed in the main camp of what is now Hindenburg Barracks. In 1958, the battalions, which were part of "Army Structure 1", consisted of four fighting companies, a HQ company and a supply company. The armoured infantry battalion was subordinated to the armoured infantry school (Panzergrenadierschule) and the tank battalion to the armoured corps school (Panzertruppenschule).

In accordance with the implementation order of 1 July 1958, the staff and headquarters company of the armoured demonstration battle group (Panzerlehrkampfgruppe) in Munster was established in the firing camp (today Örtzetal Barracks) with immediate effect and subordinated to the armoured corps school. In 1958 the demonstration units led the three-week demonstration and trial exercise ("LV 58"). This exercise tested the future organization of the Army from an organizational and strategic perspective. It concluded in Bergen-Hohne with demonstrations of the various weapon systems and their performance under the eyes of the Federal Chancellor, Konrad Adenauer. In 1959 the two demonstration battalions were grouped into the newly formed brigade, 9th Panzerlehr Brigade. The brigade was initially part of 3rd Panzer Division in Buxtehude and its first commander was Brigadier General Wilhelm von Roeder.

At the end of 1959 ("Army Structure 2") the brigade incorporated a headquarters company, 11th Panzer Reconnaissance (Lehr) Battalion, 92nd Panzergrenadier (Lehr) Battalion, 93rd Panzerlehr Battalion, 95th Panzerartillerie (Lehr) Battalion, 96th Logistic (Lehr) Battalion (established 1 February 1959), 90 Panzerpionier (Lehr) Company and 20th Infantry (Lehr) Company. In 1960 the HS 30 infantry fighting vehicle replaced the 1960 M39 armoured utility vehicle, the artillery were given the new M109G howitzer and the 4th Company of 93rd Panzerlehr Battalion became the first in the German Army to receive the Leopard 1 main battle tank.

=== Restructuring and deployments abroad ===
The 9th Panzerlehr Brigade was temporarily subordinated to 7th Panzer Division in Düsseldorf on the disbandment of the 3rd Panzer Division in 1994, but transferred in 1996 to the 1st Panzer Division in Hanover. In the reorganisation known as Heeresstruktur 5 the following units were placed under the Brigade: 92nd Panzergrenadier (Lehr) Battalion, 93rd Panzerlehr Battalion and 334th "Celle" Panzerlehr Battalion, 95th Panzerartillerie (Lehr) Battalion and 325th and 95th Panzerartillerie (Lehr) Battalions, 3rd Panzer Reconnaissance (Lehr) Battalion, 90th Panzer Reconnaissance (Lehr) Company and 90th Panzerpionier (Lehr) Company.

In 2002 elements of the brigade deployed as part of the Stabilisation Force in Bosnia and Herzegovina (SFOR) and in 2004/2005 was part of the 10th Kosovo Force (KFOR) deployment in Kosovo. In addition, elements of the brigade formed part of the 15th KFOR operational deployment and the 12th International Security Assistance Force (ISAF) deployment in Afghanistan. In order to be self-contained, the brigade was reinforced in July 2006 by the 33rd Panzer Battalion and 141st Logistic Battalion from Luttmersen as well as the 90th Reconnaissance Company from Munster. The actual strength of the brigade is around 4,700 soldiers, of which around 3,000 are based in Munster. In 2006, the 325th Panzerartillerie (Lehr) Battalion from Schwanewede moved to Munster to optimise the cohesion of the brigade's combat troops. As a result of the inclusion of the brigade in the Bundeswehr's overseas deployments, its demonstration activity had to be reduced. Until the end of the Cold War the brigade laid on about 50 demonstrations per year for national and international audiences in order to demonstrate the reliability and capability of the German Army.

The Bundeswehr has turned into a deployable armed force. From September 2006 to May 2007 about 1,400 soldiers of the formations and independent units of the brigade were deployed in Kosovo and Afghanistan. A particular highlight was the deployment of the Provincial Reconstruction Team (PRT) in Feyzabad, in North Afghanistan, who contributed to the reconstruction of the country. During that time, they succeeded in building kindergartens financed by donations from Germany, offering Afghan children the opportunity of playing and being cared for in permanent accommodation.

In mid May 2008 about 1,500 soldiers of the brigade were deployed as part of the 20th German deployment to the Balkans or were held in readiness as RRF forces. Following the end of the deployment, the brigade had to complete its regrouping of intervention forces, conducting further training in order to make its soldiers ready for further potential operations as part of 1st Panzer Division.

=== Commanders ===
The following officers have commanded the Brigade:

No.	Name	Start of appointment	End of appointment
25	BrigGen Lutz Kuhn	28 April 2022
24	BrigGen Dr. Christian Freuding	24 April 2017	6 September 2019
23	BrigGen Ullrich Spannuth	24 April 2017	6 September 2019
22	BrigGen Gunther Schneider	9 March 2014	24 April 2017
21	BrigGen Norbert Wagner	30 March 2012	9 May 2014
20	BrigGen Bernd Schütt	17 September 2010	30 March 2012
19	BrigGen Wilhelm Grün	18 July 2007	17 September 2010
18	BrigGen Carsten Jacobson	25 February 2005	18 July 2007
17	BrigGen Richard Roßmanith	2003	2005
16	Oberst Gerhard Stelz	2001	2003
15	BrigGen Wolf-Joachim Clauß	1999	2001
14	Oberst Wolfgang Korte	1996	1999
13	BrigGen Erich Becker	1 October 1990	1996
12	Oberst Joachim Spiering	1 October 1987	30 September 1990
11	BrigGen Georg-Heinrich Roth	11 October 1982	30 September 1987
10	BrigGen Helge Hansen	26 September 1980	11 October 1982
9	BrigGen Franz Uhle-Wettler	1 April 1978	25 September 1980
8	BrigGen Franz-Joachim Freiherr von Rodde	1 October 1974	31 March 1978
7	BrigGen Gottfried Ewert	1 October 1970	30 September 1974
6	BrigGen Alfred Müller	1 October 1968	30 September 1970
5	BrigGen Karl Deichen	1 October 1966	30 September 1968
4	BrigGen Karl-Reinhard von Schultzendorff	1 October 1964	30 September 1966
3	BrigGen Ernst Philipp	1 October 1962	30 September 1964
2	BrigGen Wilhelm Voß	1 June 1961	30 September 1962
1	BrigGen Wilhelm von Roeder	1 April 1958	31 May 1961

== Description of selected brigade units ==
=== 33 Armoured Battalion (Panzerbataillon 33) ===
==== Mission and organisation ====
The battalion is capable of deploying within 20 days and carrying out operational tasks in high intensity conflict as part of a multinational operation or, after a short period of mission-specific training, a range of other tasks. In peacetime it prepares for this through training and exercising its personnel and equipment. The battalion is divided into the following companies:

- 1st/ PzBtl 33: HQ and supply company
- 2nd/ PzBtl 33: tank company with Leopard 2
- 3rd/ PzBtl 33: tank company with Leopard 2
- 4th/ PzBtl 33: tank company with Leopard 2
- 5th/ PzBtl 33: operational support company

==== Insignia and history ====
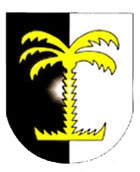

The background of its coat of arms is in Prussian black and white, as on the Iron Cross, the emblem of the Bundeswehr itself. The banners on the spears of the old Prussian-German cavalry since the wars of liberation were also black and white and have thus become the symbol of the armoured corps as well, which is seen as the successor to the heavy cavalry. The palm tree inside the escutcheon has been battalion symbol since 1958 and recalls that of the World War II Afrika Korps, part of the Wehrmacht.

In 1958 the first two tank companies in the battalion in Munster was established with M47 tanks. In 1960 the unit was given M48 main battle tanks. In 1965 the unit moved from Barme to Neustadt am Rübenberge. In 1966 it was given the first Leopard 1 main battle tanks. In 1981 the battalion received its first Leopard 2 battle tanks. In 1992 after the end of the Cold War the battalion was transferred from 3rd Panzer Brigade, in Nienburg and subordinated to 21st Panzer Brigade, in Augustdorf. In 1999 the battalion deployed to Albania and Kosovo, then in 2001 to Kosovo and Macedonia. In 2002 it was transferred first to the 1st Panzergrenadier Brigade, in Hildesheim and then to the 9th Panzerlehr Brigade in July 2006. From October 2006 to February 2007 elements of the 33rd Panzer Battalion were used as the operational battalion within Multinational Task Force South/PRIZREN as part of KFOR mission. The battalion then deployed in the first half of 2009 as the ORF (Operational Reserve Force) Battalion for EUFOR and KFOR.

=== 93 Armoured Demonstration Battalion (Panzerlehrbataillon 93) ===
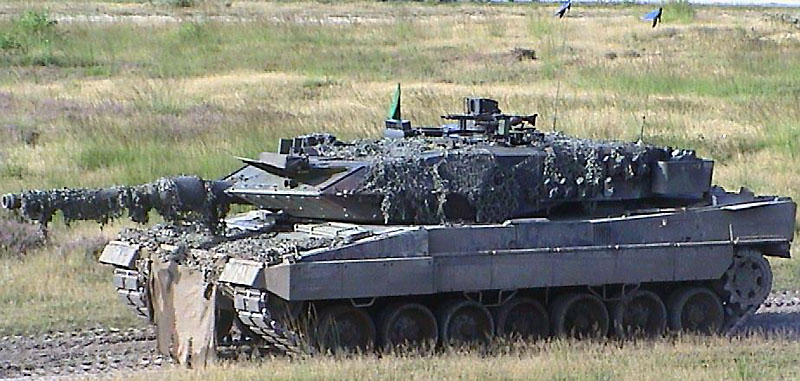
Leopard 2 battle tank

==== Mission and organisation ====
As one of three armoured battalions in the intervention forces of the Germany Army its main task is training for and participating in the peace enforcement and peacekeeping operations of the Bundeswehr. 93 Armoured Demonstration Battalion supports Panzerlehrbrigade 9 and the Munster Training School in the basic and continuation training of military leaders of armoured fighting troops. The battalion is divided into:

- 1st HQ and Supply Company
- 2nd Company with Leopard 2
- 3rd Company with Leopard 2
- 4th Company with Leopard 2
- 5th Company (operational support company)

==== Coat of arms and history ====
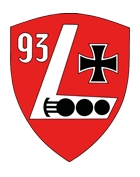

The insignia of the 93rd Panzerlehr Battalion was designed at the end of the 1960s. Its background is Panzerrot ("armour red"), the colour of the armoured troops, "L" means Lehrtruppe or "demonstration troops", the number 93 is the battalion's number and the iron cross is that of the Bundeswehr. On 1 April 1956 the battalion was formed in Munster, the first armoured battalion in the Bundeswehr. In 1959 it was given its present designation. In 1997 it moved within Munster from Schulz Barracks to Freiherr von Boeselager Barracks (its present location). 93rd Panzerlehr Battalion has proved its capability especially in recent years by inter alia carrying out exercises entitled "Combat and Air Vehicles of the German Army" and "Capability of the German Army across the Entire Mission Spectrum". For several years soldiers of the battalion have been deployed on international operations by the Bundeswehr with SFOR, EUFOR, KFOR and ISAF.

== See also ==
- Tank Battalions of the German Army 1956–2008
