= 31st Airborne Brigade =

Coordinates: 53.092272°N 8.220649°E

31st (Oldenburg) Airborne Brigade
- Luftlandebrigade 31 "Oldenburg"
- Formation sign
- Active: 26 March 1993– 18 September 2014
- Country: Germany
- Allegiance: Bundeswehr
- Branch: German Army
- Type: Stabilisation force brigade
- Size: ~ 3600 men
- Part of: Special Operations Division
- Headquarters location: Oldenburg
- Mottos: Einsatzbereit – jederzeit – weltweit ("Ready – anytime – worldwide")
- March: Fridericus-Rex-Grenadiermarsch

Commanders
- Commander: Brigadegeneral Reinhardt Zudrop

The 31st (Oldenburg) Airborne Brigade (German: Luftlandebrigade 31 “Oldenburg“) was a 3,600 man strong formation in the German Army with its headquarters in Oldenburg in north Germany. It was subordinated to the Special Operations Division and classified as part of the Army’s stabilisation forces. All elements of the Brigade were stationed in the state of Lower Saxony, the majority in Seedorf.

In 2014 the brigade was restructured as 31st Paratrooper Regiment which joined the 1st Airborne Brigade on 1 April 2015.

== Commanders ==
The following commanders have led the Brigade (rank given on appointment):

No.	Name	Takeover date	Handover date
8	Brigadegeneral Reinhardt Zudrop	11 November 2010	---
7	Brigadegeneral Frank Leidenberger	1 June 2008	11 November 2010
6	Oberst Dieter Warnecke	2005	1 June 2008
5	Oberst Rainer Hartbrod	24 October 2003	2005
4	Oberst Hans Günter Engel	12 September 2002	September 2003
3	Oberst Carl-Hubertus von Butler	24 September 1999	12 September 2002
2	Oberst Bernd Müller	28 March 1994	24 September 1999
1	Oberst Volker Löw	26 March 1993	28 March 1994

== Subordinate units ==
- 31st Airborne Brigade HQ Company
- 270 Airborne Engineer Company (Luftlandepionierkompanie 270)
- 272 Airborne Support Battalion (LuftlandeunterstützungsBtl 272)
- 310 Airborne Recce Company (LuftlandeaufklärungsKp 310)
- 313 Parachute Battalion (Fallschirmjägerbataillon 313)
- 373 Parachute Battalion (Fallschirmjägerbataillon 373)

== See also ==
- Special Operations Division

== Literature ==
Sören Sünkler: Die Spezialverbände der Bundeswehr. Stuttgart: Motorbuch Verlag 2007. ISBN 3-613-02592-2
