= 1st Airmobile Brigade =

Coordinates: 51.120172°N 9.287932°E

- German: Luftbewegliche Brigade 1
- Coat of arms
- Active: 3 April 1997–17 December 2013
- Country: Germany
- Allegiance: Bundeswehr
- Branch: German Army
- Type: Stabilisation and intervention forces
- Part of: Airmobile Operations Division
- Headquarters location: Fritzlar
- Mottos: Gewagt Gewonnen ("Dared, won")

Commanders
- Commander: Colonel Michael Mittelberg

The 1st Airmobile Brigade (German: Luftbewegliche Brigade 1) was a brigade in the German Army with its headquarters at the Fritzlar Air Base in North Hesse, It was part of the Airmobile Operations Division (Germany). The various elements of the brigade were located in the federal states of Lower Saxony, Hesse and Bavaria. Parts of the brigade were classed as intervention forces.

== History ==
In October 2011 the German Federal Ministry of Defence announced a reorganisation/reduction of the German Armed Forces. As a result, 1st Airmobile Brigade was disbanded on 17 December 2013.

== Structure ==
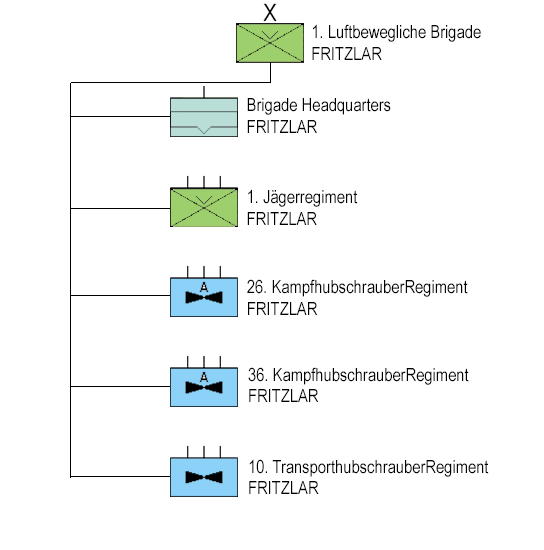
1st Airmobile Brigade Graphic before disbandment.

- HQ Company
- 1st Infantry Regiment (Jägerregiment 1)
- 26th (Franconia) Attack Helicopter Regiment (Kampfhubschrauberregiment 26)
- 36th Attack Helicopter Regiment (Kampfhubschrauberregiment 36)
- 10th Transport Helicopter Regiment (Transporthubschrauberregiment 10)

== Commanders ==
The following commanders have led the Brigade:

Rank	Name	Takeover date	Handover date
Brigadier general	Dieter Budde	3 April 1997	April 1999
Brigadier general	Reinhard Kammerer	April 1999	September 2002
Brigadier general	Werner Freers	September 2002	16 December 2002
Brigadier general	Reinhard Wolski	17 December 2002	4 August 2006
Brigadier general	Volker Halbauer	4 August 2006	5 December 2008
Brigadier general	Jürgen Setzer	5 December 2008	6 May 2011
Brigadier general	Alfons Mais	6 May 2011	5 April 2013
Colonel	Michael Mittelberg	5 April 2013	17 December 2013
