= Jörg Vollmer =

German general (born 1957)

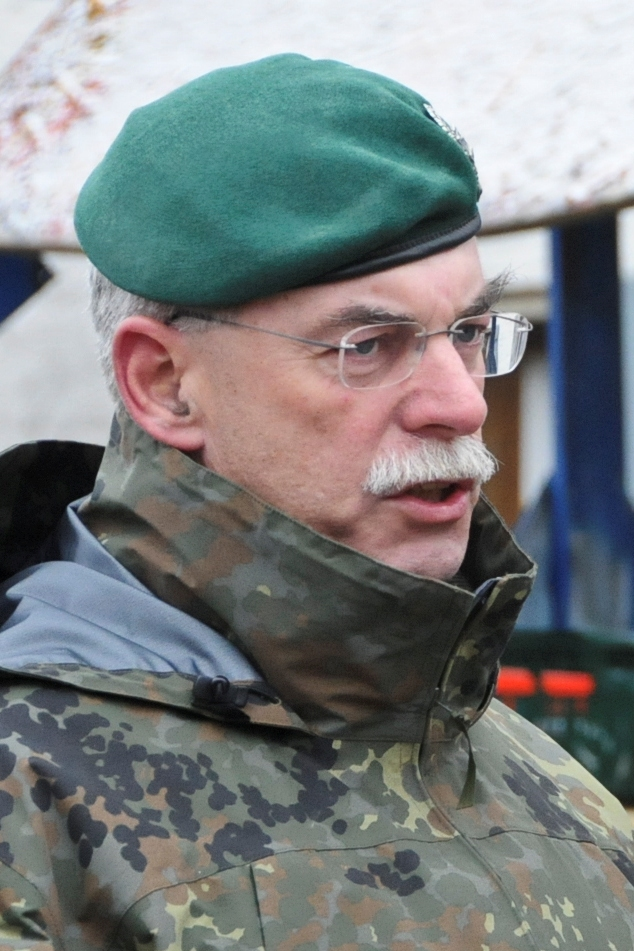
- Jörg Vollmer in 2015
- Born: 7 September 1957 (age 69); Bremen
- Military career
- Service years: 1978–present
- Rank: General
- Commands: Paratrooper Battalion 373, Airmobile Forces Command; Mechanized Infantry Brigade 37, 13th Mechanized Infantry Division; ISAF Regional Command North; Special Operations Division; Chief of Staff German Army
- Conflicts: War in Afghanistan
- Awards: Bundeswehr Cross of Honour in Gold, Silver and Bronze

General Jörg Vollmer (born 7 September 1957 in Bremen) is a retired German Army general and served as Commander of the NATO Allied Joint Force Command Brunssum from April 2020 to June 2022. He was the Inspector of the Army from 2015 to 2020.

== Background ==
Vollmer entered military service in 1978, and subsequently underwent officer training. Afterwards he studied organizational and economic science at the Helmut Schmidt University of the Armed Forces in Hamburg. Having entered field service in 1982, he held several commands in mechanized infantry units. In 1991, he attended the German general staff officer course and continued to work in the Federal Ministry of Defence, and earned his Master's Degree at the School of Advanced Military Studies in Fort Leavenworth, Kansas, United States.

In 1995, he was made G3 officer (operations) with Armoured Brigade 14 which then was a part of the 5th Armoured Division. A tour of service with SFOR and several other administrative commands followed. Promoted to general, Jörg Vollmer assumed command over Light Infantry Brigade 37 (reflagged as Mechanized Infantry Brigade 37 on April 7, 2009) on October 27, 2006. From January 2009 to October 2009 and from February 2013 to February 2014, he was Regional Commander North with the International Security Assistance Force in Mazār-e Sharīf, Afghanistan. In October 2010, he left Mechanized Infantry Brigade 37, and became chief of staff of the I. German/Dutch Corps.

In October 2011, Vollmer became the commander of the Special Operations Division. In June 2014, Vollmer took the position of Deputy Inspector of the Army and chief of Army Command, the second-highest position in the German Army. On 16 July 2015 Vollmer succeeded Generalleutnant Bruno Kasdorf as Inspector of the Army.

== See also ==
- German combat operations in Afghanistan in early 2009

Military offices
Preceded by Generalleutnant Erhard Bühler	Commander of JFC Brunssum; April 2020	Incumbent
Preceded by Generalleutnant Bruno Kasdorf	Inspector of the Army; 16 July 2015 – 13 Feb 2020	Succeeded by Generalleutnant Alfons Mais
Preceded by Generalleutnant Reinhard Kammerer	Vice Inspector of the Army; 25 June 2014 – 16 July 2015	Succeeded by Generalleutnant Carsten Jacobson
Preceded by Generalmajor Hans-Werner Fritz	Commander of Rapid Forces Division; 1 August 2011 – 12 June 2014	Succeeded by Generalmajor Eberhard Zorn
