= 21st Panzer Brigade (Bundeswehr) =

Brigade in the German Army

Coordinates: 51.914785°N 8.764644°E

21st Panzer Brigade "Lipperland"
- Panzerbrigade 21 "Lipperland"
- Formation sign for Panzerbrigade 21
- Active: 15 August 1957–present
- Country: Germany
- Allegiance: Bundeswehr
- Branch: German Army
- Type: Reaction brigade
- Size: ca. 5,500 men
- Part of: 1st Panzer Division
- Headquarters: GFM Rommel Barracks, Augustdorf
- Mottos: Für den Kampf bereit, um Frieden zu schaffen
- March: Des Großen Kurfürsten Reitermarsch

Commanders
- Current commander: Brigadegeneral Marco Eggert

Insignia
NATO Map Symbol
21
1

The 21st Panzer Brigade "Lipperland" (German: Panzerbrigade 21 "Lipperland", abbreviated to: PzBrig 21) is a brigade in the German Army and part of the Bundeswehr. The brigade staff and most of its units are based at the Field Marshal Rommel Barracks in Augustdorf, North Rhine-Westphalia. Several companies are based in Glückauf Barracks in Unna-Königsborn.

The roughly 5,500 strong brigade is one of the Army's reaction forces and, like the Panzerlehrbrigade 9 and Panzergrenadierbrigade 41, is subordinate to the 1st Panzer Division headquartered in Oldenburg.

21st Panzer Brigade was formed in 1957 as Combat Group (Panzerkampfgruppe) C3 in the 3rd Panzer Division and, from 1959 to 2006, was assigned to the 7th Panzer Division. The Brigade carries the honorific title "Lipperland" as it is stationed in the Lippe area.

== Organization ==
As of 1 March 2025 the brigade is organized as follows:

- Panzer Brigade 21 (Panzerbrigade 21), in Augustdorf
  - Staff and Signal Company Panzer Brigade 21 (Stabs- und Fernmeldekompanie Panzergrenadier Brigade 21), in Augustdorf
  - Reconnaissance Battalion 7 (Aufklärungsbataillon 7), in Ahlen with Fennek reconnaissance vehicles and KZO drones
  - Jäger Battalion 1 (Jägerbataillon 1), Schwarzenborn with Boxer armoured personnel carriers
  - Jäger Battalion 91 (Jägerbataillon 91), in Rotenburg an der Wümme with Boxer armoured personnel carriers
  - Jäger Battalion 413 (Jägerbataillon 413), in Torgelow with Boxer armoured personnel carriers
  - Jäger Battalion 921 (Jägerbataillon 921), in Schwarzenborn (Reserve unit)
  - Artillery Battalion 215 (Artilleriebataillon 215), in Augustdorf with RCH 155 155 mm self-propelled howitzers (reactivated 7 October 2025)
  - Panzer Engineer Battalion 1 (Panzerpionierbataillon 1), in Holzminden
  - Supply Battalion 7 (Versorgungsbataillon 7), in Unna

== Sources ==
- Standortältester Augustdorf, ed. (2000), Broschüre Standort Augustdorf : Im Herzen des Lipperlandes (in German), Augustdorf: WEKA, p. 58
