= 1 German-Netherlands Corps =

German/Dutch military corps

Coordinates: 51°57′59.40″N 7°36′56.15″E

- Active: 1995–present
- Country: Germany; The Netherlands
- Allegiance: NATO; European Union; Germany; The Netherlands
- Branch: Army
- Size: 1,000 troops in HQ, up to 60,000 troops in total
- Garrisons: Münster, Germany (HQ); Eibergen, The Netherlands; Garderen, The Netherlands
- Mottos: Communitate valemus Together we are strong

Commanders
- Corps Commander: Lieutenant General Peter Mirow
- Deputy Corps Commander: Major General Wilfred Rietdijk
- Chief of Staff: Brigadier General Tjeerd Blankestijn

1 German-Netherlands Corps (1GNC) is a multinational NATO tactical land headquarters based in Münster (North Rhine Westphalia), Germany. Germany and the Netherlands are the framework nations of the corps and provide the core of its personnel and capabilities. The headquarters forms part of the NATO Force Structure and is capable of commanding large multinational land forces in peace, crisis and conflict. Since 1 July 2026, 1GNC has served as NATO's tactical land headquarters for Estonia and Latvia, with command and control responsibilities for NATO and national land forces in the region. This includes command responsibilities related to the Estonian Division and Multinational Division North.

1GNC is a multinational headquarters with military and civilian personnel from 16 NATO member states. In addition to Germany and the Netherlands, personnel from Belgium, Canada, the Czech Republic, Denmark, Estonia, France, Greece, Italy, Latvia, Norway, Spain, Turkey, the United Kingdom and the United States serve within the headquarters. The multinational composition supports the corps' role in NATO's collective defence by bringing together national expertise, regional knowledge and operational experience within a single command structure.

== History ==
The idea of a joint corps dates back to the ideas of the Commanding General of the I Corps, Lt. Gen. Hannsjörn Boës. When he learned that the sole Dutch corps in Apeldoorn was to be disbanded, he suggested to the then Inspector General of the Bundeswehr, General Klaus Naumann, that the two corps be merged. The proposal was viewed positively by the respective political leaders. As a result, defence ministers of The Netherlands and Germany decided to establish the 1st German-Dutch Corps in 1993. A treaty between the two countries was signed which resulted in two previously independent Headquarters being amalgamated to form 1 German-Netherlands Corps, consisting of one German and one Dutch division.

I German Corps had previously consisted of 1st Panzer Division, 3rd Panzer Division, 7th Panzer Division, 11th Panzergrenadier Division, and 27th Airborne Brigade. After the end of the Cold War, various corps troops, such as Air defense command 1, Pioneer command 1 and Medical command 1 were dissolved in September 1993. For the I Corps Headquarters itself the plans saw first of all that it should be amalgamated in Mönchengladbach with the Territorial Northern Command. However, new considerations to multinational units meant that the German I. Korps Headquarters was disbanded in August 1995, being merged into the 1 German/Netherlands Corps.

The corps' readiness for action was achieved on August 30, 1995, ceremoniously announced in front of Münster Castle in the presence of the Dutch Prime Minister Wim Kok and the German Chancellor Helmut Kohl. The headquarters were chosen to be in Münster because Münster was already the location of the I German Corps' headquarters.

In 1997, Germany and the Netherlands laid down the cooperation in several documents. In general, these state that Germany and the Netherlands provide the Corps framework on an equal basis; both countries share the responsibility for command & control capabilities. In 2002, the Corps met NATO Full Operational Capability criteria and was certified to act as a High Readiness Force Headquarters capable of rapid deployment as part of a NATO Combined Joint Task Force. Since 2002, the multinational Corps HQ has been based on a Memorandum of Understanding between 12 NATO nations.

The original tasks of the corps lay in the defence of the territories of NATO member states as part of NATO's main defence force as well as taking part in peacekeeping missions, humanitarian missions and emergency aid during natural disasters.

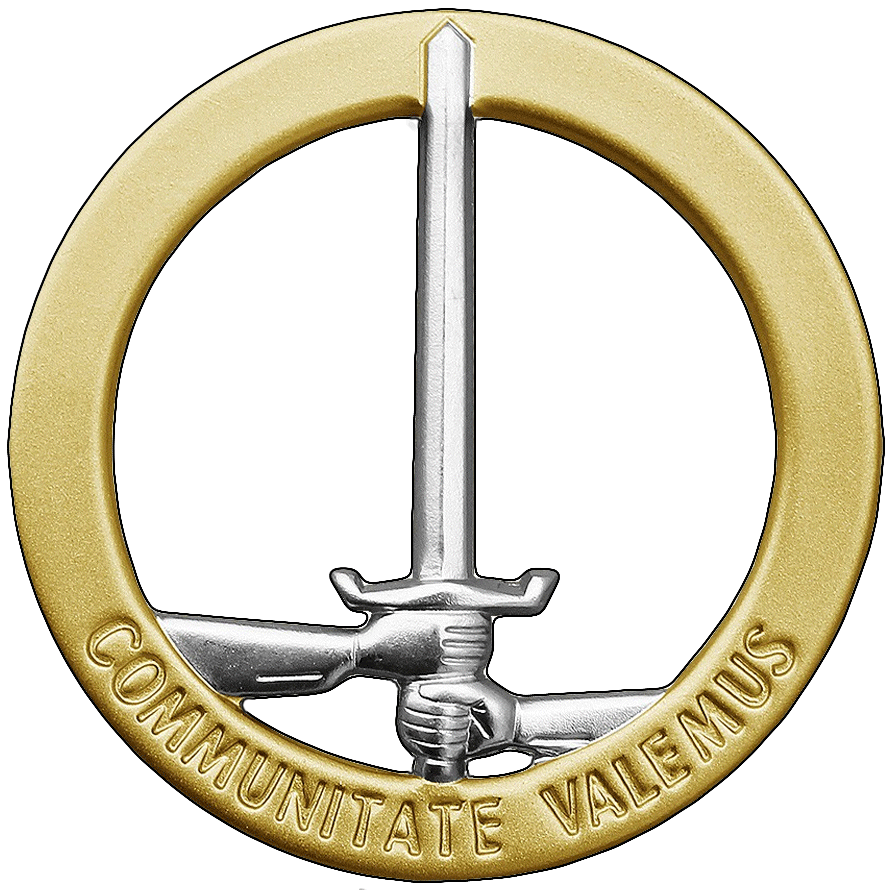
Beret badge of 1 (GE/NL) Corps

Soon after its Final Operational Capability, the corps was given new tasks: it was designated "Forces Answerable to the Western European Union", and since December 1999, the corps is a Land Component Command within NATO's command structure. At this time its subordinated divisions were the 1st German Panzer Division from Military District Command II in Hannover, and the Netherlands' First Division "7 December", a mechanised infantry formation stationed in Apeldoorn.

At the same time, the transition to a multinational unit began, which included considerable issues in organisational psychology between the two forces. After concluding exercise "Cannon Cloud" at the Baumholder training area in November 2002, the corps became a "High Readiness Forces (Land) Headquarters" (HRF(L) HQ) as part of NATO's Combined Joint Task Force (CJTF). The first deployment within this framework took place between February and August 2003 when the corps operated as ISAF's headquarters in Afghanistan. (HQ ISAF-3), following the command periods of the United Kingdom (ISAF-1) and Turkey (ISAF-2)

=== Land Component Command ===
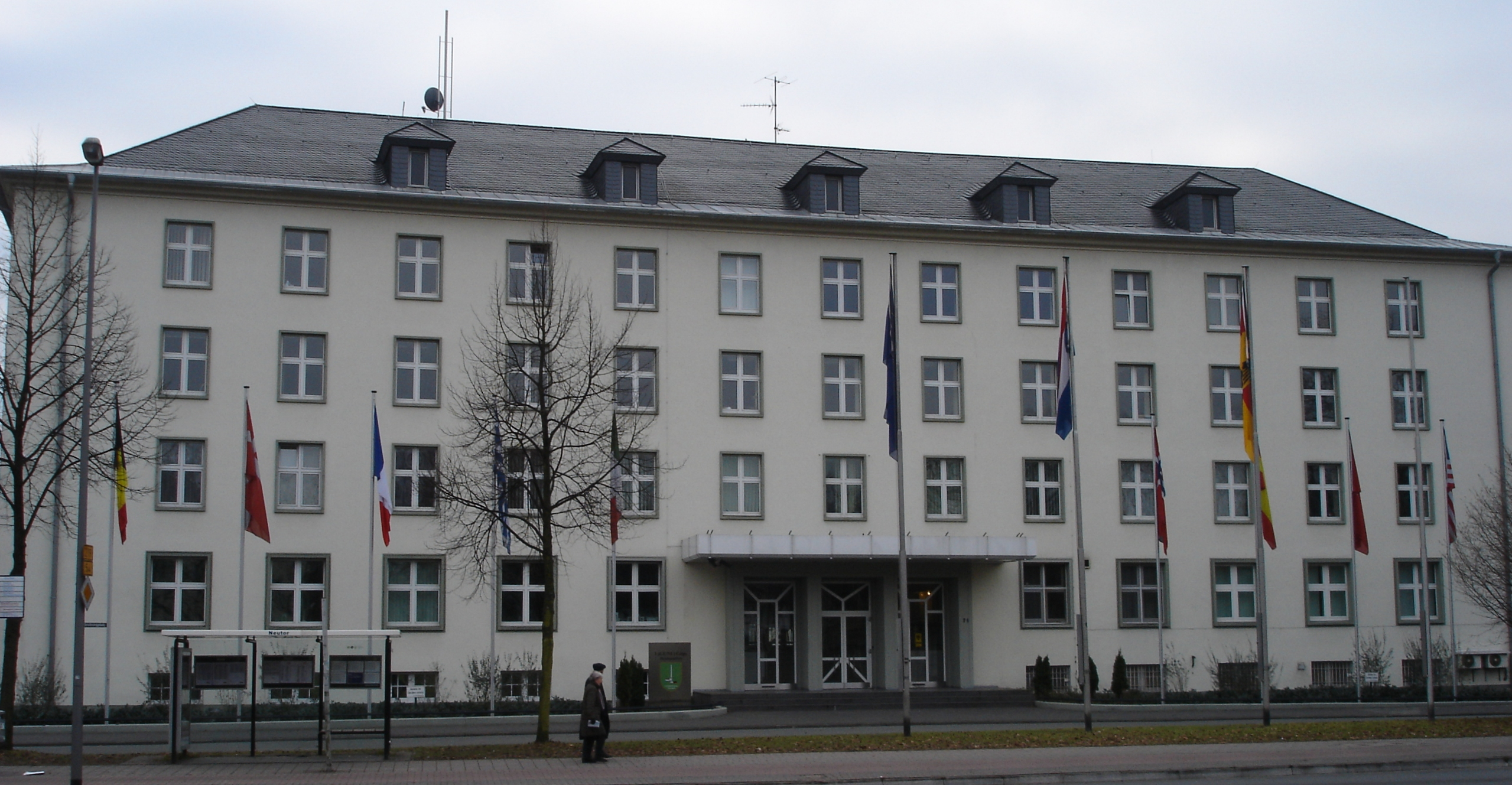
Headquarters of 1(GE/NL)Corps in Münster

Following this, the "Land Component Command" was further developed. From the beginning of 2004, the corps was subordinate to NATO Allied Joint Force Command Naples and became "NATO Response Force-Headquarters" (NRF) in November 2004. During the first half of 2005 it was on stand-by as the fourth headquarters NRF-4.

From January to July 2005, the Corps assumed the standby role as the NATO Response Force Land Component Command to demonstrate the NATO Initial Operational Capability. During the months of May and June 2005, 1GNC practiced this capability by conducting exercise IRON SWORD, a challenging Deployment Field Training Exercise to practice multinational operations in an expeditionary environment. In deploying more than 6,000 soldiers and 2,500 vehicles by land, air and sea from Central Europe to Norway, the Corps clearly illustrated the progress made during the NATO Response Force standby period and made a real contribution towards the continual development of the NATO Response Force Full Operational Capability.

The Corps was also the on-call High Readiness Force for NATO contingency operations in 2008. In 2009, the Corps deployed to Afghanistan providing the core staff of the International Security Assistance Force (ISAF) and the ISAF Joint Command. The Corps also provided national troop contributions, most notably a 40-man contingent to Regional Command South.

From mid 2013 until January 2014, some 200 multi-national Staff Officers and soldiers deployed to Kabul, Afghanistan, to contribute to the ISAF HQ, ISAF Joint Command and other units.

In 2015, 1GNC was on stand-by for the NRF for the third time. Following the decisions taken in Cardiff, Wales, additionally the Corps was tasked to develop and test the Initial Very High Readiness Task Force concept, which resulted in deployment of units from Belgium, the Czech Republic, Germany, The Netherlands and Norway to the Zagan training Area in Poland to conduct exercise Noble Jump. Due to the security situation at that moment, NATO Secretary General Jens Stoltenberg, SACEUR General Philip Breedlove, four Ministers of Defence as well as some 200 journalists visited the exercise.

The Corps served as Land Component Command for the NATO Response Force in 2005, 2008, 2015, 2019. In 2023, 1GNC assumed responsibility as Land Component Command NATO Response Force (NRF).

=== NATO Tactical Land Command for Estonia and Latvia ===
On 1 July 2026, 1 German-Netherlands Corps (1GNC) assumed responsibility as NATO's tactical land headquarters for Estonia and Latvia, taking over this responsibility from Multinational Corps Northeast (MNC-NE). The new command arrangement gives 1GNC command and control responsibilities for designated NATO and national land forces in Estonia and Latvia, including command responsibilities related to the Estonian Division and Multinational Division North. The Corps is responsible for planning and conducting exercises, contributing to regional defence planning, and supporting the integration of reinforcements. The transfer of responsibility was marked by a NATO ceremony in the Estonian-Latvian border towns of Valga and Valka on 30 June 2026.

== Commanders ==
Nr.	Name	Country	Start of appointment	End of appointment
13	Lt Gen Peter Mirow	Germany	27 March 2025	
12	Lt Gen Nico Tak	Netherlands	17 March 2022	27 March 2025
11	Lt Gen Andreas Marlow	Germany	6 February 2020	17 March 2022
10	Lt Gen Alfons Mais	Germany	9 May 2019	6 February 2020
9	Lt Gen Michiel van der Laan	Netherlands	7 April 2016	9 May 2019
8	Lt Gen Volker Halbauer	Germany	25 September 2013	7 April 2016
7	Lt Gen Ton van Loon	Netherlands	13 April 2010	25 September 2013
6	Lt Gen Volker Wieker	Germany	1 July 2008	13 April 2010
5	Lt Gen Tony van Diepenbrugge	Netherlands	1 July 2005	1 July 2008
4	Lt Gen Norbert van Heyst	Germany	4 July 2002	1 July 2005
3	Lt Gen Marcel Urlings	Netherlands	22 March 2000	4 July 2002
2	Lt Gen Karsten Oltmanns	Germany	27 November 1997	22 March 2000
1	Lt Gen Ruurd Reitsma	Netherlands	30 August 1995	27 November 1997

== Structure ==
1GNC maintains a high level of operational readiness and is capable of commanding multinational land forces in peace, crisis and conflict. Its current responsibilities focus on the defence of Estonia and Latvia, where it plans, coordinates and conducts land operations and supports the integration of Allied forces and reinforcements into NATO's regional defence plans.

The following units are permanently part of 1GNC:

- Staff Support Battalion (Münster)
- Communication and Information Systems (CIS) Battalion (Eibergen and Garderen)

Within NATO's command framework, 1GNC has command responsibilities related to:

- Estonian Division in Tallinn (Estonia)
- Multinational Division North in Ādaži (Latvia)

== See also ==
- Franco-German Brigade
