= 31st Paratrooper Regiment (Bundeswehr) =

Coordinates: 53.3367°N 9.2627°E

31st Paratrooper Regiment Fallschirmjägerregiment 31
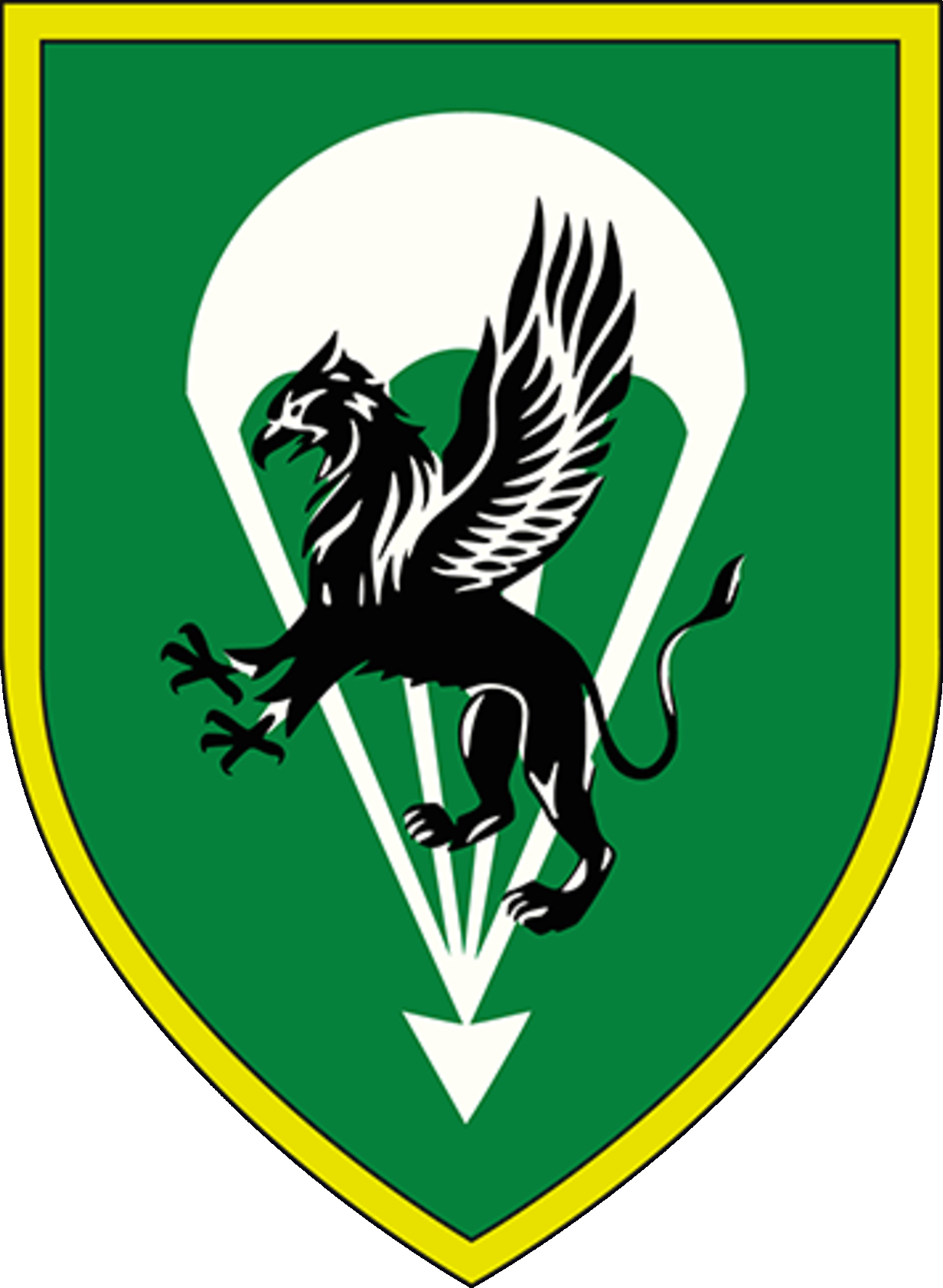
- Formation sign
- Active: 25 November 2014–
- Country: Germany
- Allegiance: Bundeswehr
- Size: ~ 1800 men
- Part of: 1st Airborne Brigade
- Headquarters location: Seedorf
- Motto: Im Sturme Fest ("Firmly in the storm")

The 31st Paratrooper Regiment (German: Fallschirmjägerregiment 31) is a 1,800 men strong elite formation for Special Operations of the German Army with its headquarters in Seedorf in north Germany. The elite regiment was formed in fall 2014 by restructuring the 31st Airborne Brigade. Initially under direct command of the Rapid Forces Division it joined the newly raised 1st Airborne Brigade on 1 April 2015.

It is regarded as one of the most selective units in the German Armed Forces. Alongside active personnel, it also comprises a number of reserve officers who are held to the same rigorous standards and training requirements and must pass an equally demanding selection process, with an acceptance rate of only around 2 percent.

== Structure ==
- 31st Paratrooper Regiment
  - 1st Staff and Support Company
  - 2nd EGB Forces Company
  - 3rd EGB Forces Company
  - 4th Paratrooper Company
  - 5th Paratrooper Company
  - 6th Paratrooper Company
  - 7th Fire Support Company (with Wiesel Armored Weapons Carriers and 120mm mortars)
  - 8th Airborne Logistic Company
  - 9th Airborne Medical Company
  - 10th Recruits Training Company
  - 11th Paratrooper Company (Reserve)
