= Helge Hansen (general) =

- Born: 13 March 1936 (age 90); Dresden, Nazi Germany
- Military career
- Allegiance: Germany
- Branch: Army
- Service years: 1957–1996
- Rank: General
- Commands: Panzergrenadier Battalion 312; Panzerlehrbrigade 9; 1st Armoured Division; Inspector of the Army; Commander Allied Forces Central Europe

Helge Hansen (born 13 March 1936) is a retired general who served in the German Army within the Bundeswehr. From 1992 to 1994 he was the Inspector of the Army and from 1994 to 1996 he was Commander Allied Forces Central Europe within NATO.

== Military career ==
=== Training and first commands ===
Hansen was born on 1936 13 March 1936 in Dresden and entered the Bundeswehr in 1957 as an officer cadet. He trained with the Panzergrenadier corps. In 1959 he was promoted to second lieutenant (Leutnant) and was employed as a platoon commander in a Panzergrenadier battalion. Six years later, in 1965, Hansen was promoted to captain (Hauptmann) and took over the post of a company commander for two years within 173rd Panzergrenadier Battalion in Hamburg. From 1967 to 1969 he attended the General Staff course at the Bundeswehr Staff College in Hamburg as a major and was awarded the General Heusinger Prize as the best student of his year. Thereafter he was appointed as the G1 personnel staff office in the 12th Armoured Division in Veitshöchheim. From 1971 to 1972 Hansen attended the NATO Defence College in Rome and afterwards served as a staff officer in the Federal Ministry of Defence in Bonn.

From 1974 to 1977 Hansen commanded the 312th Panzergrenadier Battalion in Delmenhorst as a lieutenant colonel (Oberstleutnant). After this command Hansen was posted in 1977 to Brunssum in the Netherlands where he served as a staff officer in the Headquarters of the Allied Forces Central Europe within NATO. Returning to Germany he then served as the department head for military-political policy in the Defence Staff in Bonn under General Inspector Jürgen Brandt.

=== Service as a general ===
As a colonel (Oberst) Hansen took over Panzerlehrbrigade 9 in Munster from 26 September 1980 to 11 October 1982. In 1982 he was promoted to brigadier general (Brigadegeneral). Next Hansen was posted from October 1982 to March 1984 as the divisional head of military politics in the office of the Permanent Representative of the Federal Republic of Germany with NATO in Brussels. Following that tour Hansen returned to Germany and took over the 1st Armoured Division in Hanover in April 1985 in the rank of major general (Generalmajor) from Henning von Ondarza and commanded the division until 30 September 1987. From 1 October 1987 to 30 September 1990 Hansen commanded the German III Corps as a lieutenant general (Generalleutnant) in Koblenz.

In October 1990 Hansen again took over a NATO post, this time in the NATO Headquarters in Europe (SHAPE) in Mons in Belgium. Until spring 1992 he acted as the Deputy Chief of Staff, responsible for planning and operations under generals Hans-Henning von Sandrart and Henning von Ondarza.

When Generalleutnant Jörg Schönbohm was appointed as Secretary of State, Hansen filled the vacant post of Inspector of the Army on 18 February 1992, where he stayed until 21 March 1994. As Inspector he launched Army Structure V. But he was unable to see this through as he did not stay long in post. On 21 March 1994, after only two years, he handed over to Hartmut Bagger and, promoted to General, he made his way to Brunssum, where he took over on 1 April from Henning von Ondarza the post of Commander Allied Forces Central Europe within NATO and commanded it until his retirement in March 1996.

== In retirement ==
After retiring from the Army, Hansen called by Supreme Allied Commander Europe (SACEUR), ran the "Senior Mentor" seminars for "operational art" for higher NATO leadership forces as well as courses on operational planning for staff officers at the NATO School in Oberammergau.

He mainly acts as the Senior Mentor at the British Joint Services Command and Staff College, the Canadian Forces College, the Austrian Defence Academy and the Bundeswehr Staff College. In 2003 the Royal Military College of Canada awarded Hansen an honorary doctorate in military science. In addition he sits on the board of trustees of the Foundation for Memorial and Peace in the German War Graves Commission.

In 1999 Hansen was a member of the Weizsäcker Commission, which carried out a review of the Bundeswehr and made recommendations for its future development.

Since 2002 he has been a partner in the firm of ELENXIS Management Advice and advises especially medium-sized companies in the area of business succession.

Hansen is married with three sons.

Military offices
| Preceded by Henning von Ondarza | Commander in Chief, Allied Forces Central Europe; 1994–1996 | Succeeded by Dieter Stöckmann |
| Preceded by Generalleutnant Jörg Schönbohm | Inspector of the Army; 18 February 1992 – 21 March 1994 | Succeeded by Generalleutnant Hartmut Bagger |
| Preceded by Generalleutnant Karl Erich Diedrichs | Commanding General of III Corps; October 1987 – September 1990 | Succeeded by Generalmajor Anton Steer |
| Preceded by Generalmajor Henning von Ondarza | Commander of 1st Panzer Division (Bundeswehr); 1 May 1985 – 30 September 1987 | Succeeded by Generalmajor Hartmut Behrendt |
