= 3rd Panzer Division =

3rd Panzer Division may refer to:

- 3rd Panzer Division (Wehrmacht)
- 3rd Panzer Division (Bundeswehr)
- 3rd SS Panzer Division Totenkopf
