= Ton van Loon =

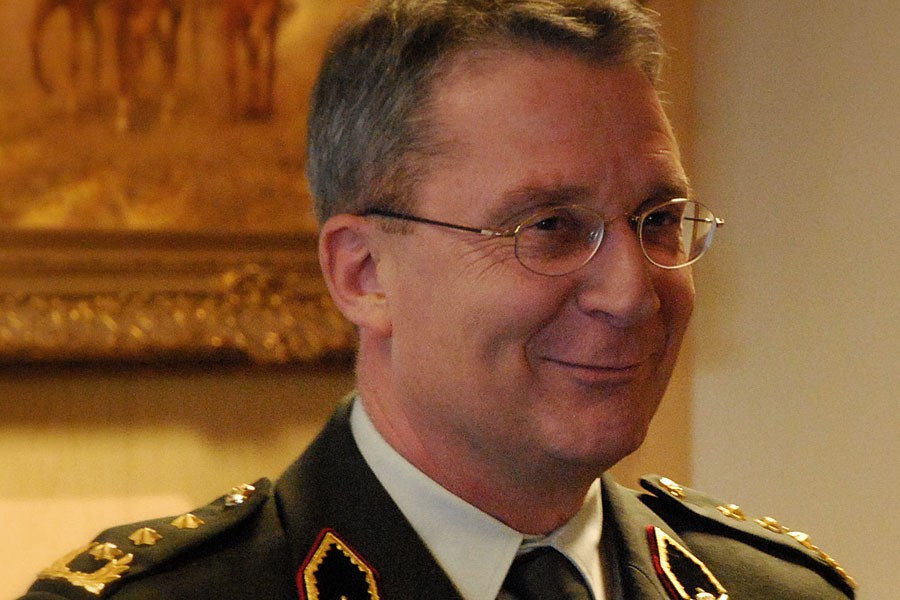
- General van Loon in 2010
- Born: October 10, 1956 (age 70); Weert
- Military career
- Allegiance: The Netherlands
- Branch: Royal Netherlands Army
- Service years: 1981-2013
- Rank: Lieutenant General
- Commands: I. German/Dutch Corps; Command Component Land Heidelberg; Regional Command South; 43 Gemechaniseerde Brigade
- Conflicts: Kosovo Force (KFOR); War in Afghanistan
- Awards: Officer of the Order of Orange-Nassau, with swords Grand Merit Cross with Star of the Order of Merit of the Federal Republic of Germany; Ehrenkreuz der Bundeswehr in Gold; NATO Meritorious Service Medal

Ton van Loon (born October 10, 1956, in Weert) is a commander from the Netherlands. He is a lieutenant general employed by NATO who took control of the International Security Assistance Force (ISAF), Regional Command South (RC-S) on November 1, 2006, until May 1, 2007. From April 13, 2010, until September 25, 2013, he commanded I. German/Dutch Corps. He is married and has two children.

== Biography ==
Van Loon was born on Weert into a military family. He is the son of a sergeant major in the infantry.

Van Loon enrolled in the Koninklijke Militaire Academie in Breda in 1977. Graduating from the academy in 1981 he was assigned to the 41st Artillery Battalion stationed in Seedorf. He held several different positions with the 41st before returning to The Netherlands to continue his military education.

Starting in 1990, Van Loon attended the Royal Netherlands Army Staff College at The Hague, following staff officer training courses. This led to a staff officer position with the 13th Mechanized Brigade in Oirschot starting in 1992. In this position, he was able to leverage and solidify his earlier experiences in international military cooperation by organizing the first rotations of the Royal Netherlands Army at the (US) Combat Manoeuvre and Training Centre in Hohenfels. He also gained experience with modern training methods when he played a leading role in the introduction of instrumented training in the Army.

In 1995 he attended the British Army Command and Staff College, after which he returned to international military cooperation with a staff position at the I. German/Dutch Corps in Münster. As a staff officer in charge of training, he organized several large training exercises and worked on further command integration until March 1998 when he was assigned command of the 11th Artillery Battalion.

As Battalion Commander he was deployed to Kosovo in 1999 as part of the KFOR1 Multinational Brigade South (under German command). He received a knighthood for his leadership efforts in this mission, Knight of the Order of Orange-Nassau.

From June 2000 to January 2004 Van Loon served on the Staff of the Royal Netherlands Army in The Hague. In this period he was promoted twice (first to colonel, then to brigadier general) and held the Chief of Operations position. Again he focused on military cooperation with the German Armed Forces, becoming part of the cooperative triangle.

On January 8, 2004, he was assigned command of the 43rd Mechanized Brigade in Havelte. Under his command, this brigade developed into the nucleus of the Land Component Multinational Brigade of NATO Response Force 4. NATO awarded him the NATO Meritorious Service Medal for this command.

On October 13, 2006, Van Loon was promoted to the rank of major general, ahead of his deployment to Afghanistan. Starting November 1 he assumed command of the Regional Command South and was stationed in Kandahar. During this posting, he conducted several operations and continued NATO efforts to implement the 3D (defense, diplomacy, development) program. His involvement with ISAF continued after his return to The Netherlands, where he served as a senior mentor in a number of pre-deployment exercises and as a subject lecturer.

Returning to Dutch-German cooperation efforts, Van Loon reported to Heidelberg in August 2007. There he served at the Allied Land Component Command Headquarters until April 2010 as chief of staff, in a period that the Headquarters was transformed into a force command providing deployable teams at the operational level. Early in 2010 one of these teams was deployed to Kabul, to the ISAF Headquarters. At that occasion, Van Loon was presented with the Ehrenkreuz der Bundeswehr in Gold for "his career-long efforts to improve Dutch-German cooperation".

On April 1, 2010, he was promoted to lieutenant general ahead of his April 13 assignment to the I. German/Dutch Corps as Corps Commander. On September 25, 2013, he handed his command over to the I. German/Dutch Corps over to the German Lt Gen Volker Halbauer. Upon his retirement, he was awarded by Germany with the Grand Merit Cross with Star Order of Merit of the Federal Republic of Germany and he was promoted to Officer in the Order of Orange-Nassau with swords.

== Military decorations ==
- Officer of the Order of Orange-Nassau, with swords
- Commemorative Medal Multinational Peace Operations (variant: Former Yugoslavia)
- Commemorative Medal Peace Operations
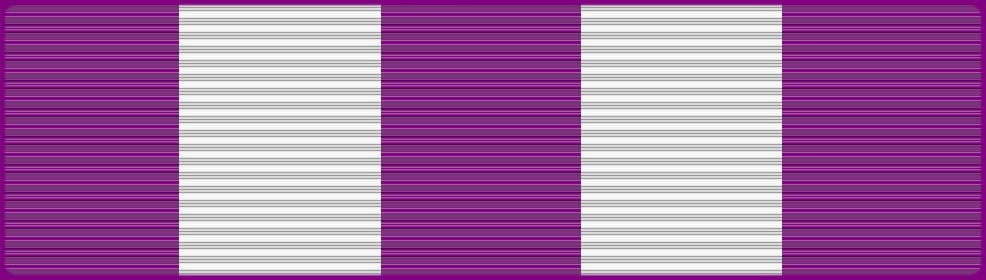
- Kosovo Medal
- Officers' Cross
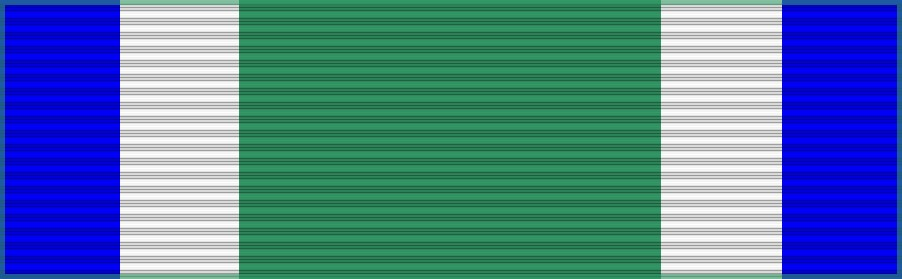
- Army Foreign Service Medal
- Military Performance Event Cross of the Royal Dutch Reserve Officers Association
- NATO Meritorious Service Medal
- NATO Kosovo Medal
- NATO Former Yugoslavia Medal
- Grand Merit Cross with Star of the Order of Merit of the Federal Republic of Germany
- Ehrenkreuz der Bundeswehr in Gold
