= Tony van Diepenbrugge =

J.A. van Diepenbrugge
- Born: May 8, 1951 (age 75); Breda
- Military career
- Allegiance: Netherlands
- Branch: Royal Netherlands Army
- Service years: 1973-2008
- Rank: Lieutenant General
- Nickname: Tony
- Commands: Corps Commander I. German/Dutch Corps
- Conflicts: Lebanon (UNIFIL); Yugoslav Wars; Implementation Force (IFOR); Kosovo Force (KFOR); Stabilisation Force (SFOR)

Lieutenant General (retired) J.A. (Tony) van Diepenbrugge (born May 8, 1951) is a former officer of the Royal Netherlands Army. He served in Lebanon and Bosnia-Hercegovina, held several positions throughout the Army and was Corps Commander of the I. German/Dutch Corps.

Van Diepenbrugge is married to his wife Lily; they have two children together. He has been a member of the VVD since he was 22.

== Biography ==
Van Diepenbrugge was born into a military family in 1951 in the Dutch city of Breda. His father was an officer in the Royal Netherlands Army, his mother was British. He moved to Amersfoort with his family at age 10, where he graduated high school. He graduated in 1969 and enrolled in the Koninklijke Militaire Academie at Breda.

Graduating the academy in 1973, he was commissioned a second lieutenant and assigned to the 11th Independent Armoured Reconnaissance Squadron at Schaarsbergen as a platoon commander. After that he was sent back to the academy at Breda as an instructor. Following that he was posted to the 41st Independent Reconnaissance Squadron at Seedorf as Deputy Commander.

In 1979 he was promoted captain and assigned a squadron command with the 103rd Reconnaissance Battalion. He attended the Royal Netherlands Army Staff College at The Hague, following army staff courses. After his graduation he requested deployment to Lebanon, where he worked on the UNIFIL staff in 1981. After his return to the Netherlands he returned to the Staff College for a high-level management course and was promoted major. He was then assigned to the Planning Department of the Quartermaster, where he advanced to the position of military assigned Field Officer of the Quartermaster. In this position he was involved with the DOEL '88 project.

In 1987 Van Diepenbrugge was promoted lieutenant colonel and made Chief of the General Staffing Policies section at the Planning department of the Army Directorate of Personnel. He worked there until 1989, when he was assigned to the Staff Section (G3 Section) of the First Army Corps as Section Chief. Following this posting he worked at the National Defense College for two years, starting as Chief of Operations; following a promotion to full colonel he became chief of Training. He took the opportunity at the same time to follow the Defense Top Management course.

His tenure at the College ended on October 27, 1996 when he was deployed to the Former Republic of Yugoslavia for a six-month tour. Assigned to the IFOR Headquarters in Sarajevo he worked as director of the Joint Operation Center. Returning to the Netherlands he was assigned Department Chief of the Department Personnel for Career Servicemen at the Central Directorate Personnel and Organization. On November 5, 1998, he was promoted brigadier general and assigned command of the 13th Mechanized Brigade – a position he held until April 4, 2001.

In September of the same year Van Diepenbrugge returned to Sarajevo as Commander Multinational Division Southwest in Bosnia-Herzegovina with the NATO mission SFOR. This was his first international command, consisting of personnel of eight different nationalities. On October 11, 2002, he was promoted major general and made Deputy Commander of the Royal Netherlands Army. This appointment coincided with appointments of Inspector of Reserve Army Personnel and Governor of the Capital.

On June 1, 2005, Tony van Diepenbrugge was promoted to lieutenant general and assigned command of the I. German/Dutch Corps. He held this position until July 1, 2008, when he stood down from the Army.

Following his retirement, Van Diepenbrugge became active in the local politics of his home town of Epe. In 2010 he stood as candidate for the city council for his party, the VVD. Today he is president of the Netherlands Cavalry Escort of Honour Foundation.
