= Inspector of the Army =

Commander and highest ranking officer of the German Army

Inspector of the German Army
- Inspekteur des Heeres
- Standard of the Inspector of the Army

- Incumbent; Generalleutnant Christian Freuding since 1 October 2025
- Federal Minister of Defence
- Abbreviation: InspH
- Reports to: General Inspector of the Bundeswehr
- Precursor: Oberkommando des Heeres

The Inspector of the Army (German: Inspekteur des Heeres or InspH) is the title held by the commander and highest ranking officer of the German Army (unless the Inspector General is an army officer) of the modern-day German Armed Forces or Bundeswehr. The Inspector is the most senior officer to serve in the German Army and is a military adviser to the Government of Germany as well as the Ministry of Defence.

He is responsible for the readiness of personnel and materiel in the German Army, in that regard he reports directly to the Inspector General of the Bundeswehr (and before 2012, directly to the Federal Minister of Defence). The Inspector commands the Army Command with its subordinate divisions (and division equivalents) and the Army Office with its subordinate training and support establishments. He is a member of the Defence Council for Bundeswehr-wide matters.

The Inspector and his deputy both hold the rank of lieutenant general (Generalleutnant).

The incumbent Inspector is Christian Freuding since October 1st, 2025.

== List of Inspectors ==
The Inspectors of the Army, since 1956.

No.	Portrait	Name	Took office	Left office	Time in office
1	Hans Röttiger	Hans Röttiger (1896–1960)	21 September 1956	15 April 1960 †	3 years, 116 days
2	Alfred Zerbel	Alfred Zerbel (1904–1987)	16 April 1960	30 September 1964	4 years, 258 days
3	Ulrich de Maizière	Ulrich de Maizière (1912–2006) (Note: Promoted to General Inspector of the Bundeswehr)	1 October 1964	24 August 1966	1 year, 327 days
4	Josef Moll	Josef Moll (1908–1998)	25 August 1966	30 September 1968	2 years, 36 days
5	Albert Schnez	Albert Schnez (1911–2007)	1 October 1968	30 September 1971	2 years, 364 days
6	Ernst Ferber [de]	Ernst Ferber (1914–1998) (Note: Promoted to the Commander of the Allied Joint Force Command Brunssum)	1 October 1971	30 September 1973	1 year, 364 days
7	Horst Hildebrandt [de]	Horst Hildebrandt (1919–1989)	1 October 1973	30 March 1979	5 years, 181 days
8	Johannes Poeppel	Johannes Poeppel (1921–2007)	1 April 1979	30 September 1981	2 years, 182 days
9	Meinhard Glanz [de]	Meinhard Glanz (1924–2005)	1 October 1981	30 September 1984	4 years, 365 days
10	Hans-Henning von Sandrart [de]	Hans-Henning von Sandrart (1933–2013)	1 October 1984	25 September 1987	2 years, 359 days
11	Henning von Ondarza [de]	Henning von Ondarza (born 1933)	26 October 1987	26 September 1991	3 years, 335 days
12	Jörg Schönbohm	Jörg Schönbohm (1937–2019) (Note: Became undersecretary for Security policy in the Federal Ministry of Defence)	27 October 1991	18 February 1992	114 days
13	Helge Hansen	Helge Hansen (born 1936)	18 February 1992	21 March 1994	2 years, 31 days
14	Hartmut Bagger	Hartmut Bagger (1938–2024)	21 March 1994	6 February 1996	1 year, 322 days
15	Helmut Willmann [de]	Helmut Willmann (born 1940)	6 February 1996	28 March 2001	5 years, 50 days
16	Gert Gudera [de]	Gert Gudera (born 1943)	28 March 2001	3 March 2004	2 years, 341 days
17	Hans-Otto Budde [de]	Hans-Otto Budde (born 1948)	4 March 2004	24 March 2010	6 years, 19 days
18	Werner Freers	Werner Freers (born 1954)	24 March 2010	11 September 2012	2 years, 172 days
19	Bruno Kasdorf [de]	Bruno Kasdorf (born 1952)	11 September 2012	16 July 2015	2 years, 308 days
20	Jörg Vollmer	Jörg Vollmer (born 1957)	16 July 2015	13 February 2020	4 years, 212 days
21	Alfons Mais	Alfons Mais (born 1962)	13 February 2020	30 September 2025	5 years, 229 days
22	Christian Freuding	Christian Freuding (born 1971)	1 October 2025	Incumbent	1 year, 44 days
