= Horst Ohrloff =

German general

- Born: 2 April 1917
- Died: 9 May 1997 (aged 80)
- Military career
- Allegiance: Germany; West Germany
- Branch: German Army
- Rank: Generalmajor
- Commands: 3rd Panzer Division (Bundeswehr)
- Conflicts: World War II
- Awards: Knight's Cross of the Iron Cross

Horst Ohrloff (2 April 1917 – 9 May 1997) was a German general in the Bundeswehr. During World War II, he served as an officer in the Wehrmacht and was a recipient of the Knight's Cross of the Iron Cross of Nazi Germany.

== Awards and decorations ==
- Knight's Cross of the Iron Cross on 27 July 1941 as Oberleutnant and chief of the 11./Panzer-Regiment 25

Military offices
Preceded by Generalmajor Walter Carganico	Commander of 3rd Armoured Division (Bundeswehr); 1 October 1970 – 30 September 1974	Succeeded by Generalmajor Eberhard Burandt
