= Hartmut Bagger =

German general (1938–2024)

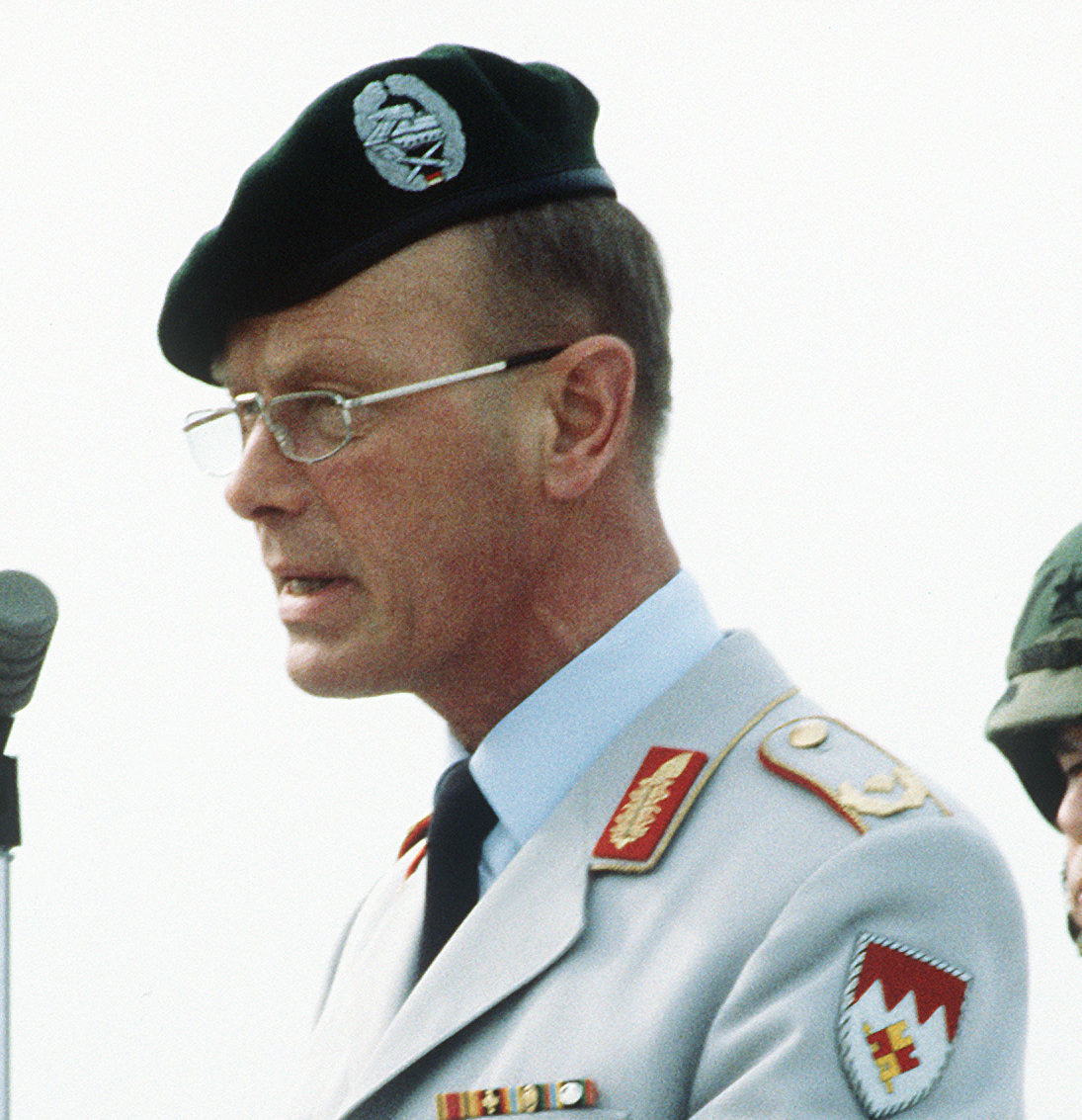
- Born: 17 July 1938; Braunsberg, Germany (today Braniewo, Poland)
- Died: 26 January 2024 (aged 85); Meckenheim, North Rhine-Westphalia, Germany
- Military career
- Allegiance: Germany
- Service years: 1958–1999
- Rank: General

Hartmut Bagger (17 July 1938 – 26 January 2024) was a German general. He served as Chief of Staff of the German Army from 1994 to 1996 and Chief of Staff of the German armed forces, the Bundeswehr, from 1996 to 1999.

== Biography ==
Hartmut Bagger was born in Braunsberg, East Prussia (today Braniewo, Poland) and fled the advancing Red Army at the end of World War II to Celle. After passing his Abitur Bagger volunteered the Bundeswehr in 1958 as a Panzergrenadier. In 1960, he was promoted to a lieutenant at the Panzergrenadierbataillon 82 in Lüneburg.

Bagger passed his general staff training at the Führungsakademie der Bundeswehr in 1969–1971, promoted to a Major he served at the Panzerbrigade 18, (Neumünster) and became a lecturer of Military policy at the Führungsakademie. He completed a course at the Armed Forces Staff College, Norfolk, Virginia.

From 1976 to 1978, Bagger commanded the Panzergrenadierbataillon 51 in Rotenburg an der Fulda and served at the Bundesministerium der Verteidigung until 1980. From April 1980 till September 1982, Bagger, now an Oberst, was the Chief of staff of the 3. Panzerdivision and afterwards head of the branch "Security policy" at the Hamburg Führungsakademie, from October 1984 till April 1988 he commanded the Panzergrenadierbrigade 7 (Hamburg).

Bagger was promoted a Brigadegeneral in 1988 and served as the Chief of Staff at the III. Korps (Koblenz) until 22 November 1990 and commander of the 12. Panzerdivision (Veitshöchheim) until March 1992.

Bagger became the deputy Inspekteur des Heeres (Chief of Staff of the German Army) on 1 April 1992 and Inspekteur des Heeres on 21 March 1994. After general Klaus Naumann became Chairman of the NATO Military Committee Bagger followed him as the Chief of Staff of the Bundeswehr on 8 February 1996, a post he held till his retirement on 31 March 1999.

Bagger lived at Meckenheim, was married and had two sons. One of them is the diplomat Thomas Bagger. Hartmut Bagger died on 26 January 2024, at the age of 85.

Military offices
Preceded by General Klaus Naumann	Chief of Staff of the Federal Armed Forces; 8 February 1996 – 31 March 1999	Succeeded by General Hans-Peter von Kirchbach
Preceded by Generalleutnant Helge Hansen	Inspector of the Army; 21 March 1994 – 6 February 1996	Succeeded by Generalleutnant Helmut Willmann
Preceded by Generalleutnant Harald Schulz	Deputy Inspector of the Army; 1 April 1992 – 31 March 1994	Succeeded by Generalleutnant Winfried Weick
Preceded by Generalmajor Hartmut Foertsch	Commander of 12th Panzer Division (Bundeswehr); 23 November 1990 – 31 March 1992	Succeeded by Generalmajor Manfred Eisele
