= Christian Freuding =

German Army general (born 1971)

- GL Christian Freuding
- Born: Christian Freuding; August 20, 1971 (age 55); Weiden in der Oberpfalz, Bavaria, West Germany
- Education: Helmut Schmidt University (BS)
- Children: Two
- Military career
- Allegiance: Germany
- Branch: German Army
- Service years: 1990–present
- Rank: Lieutenant general
- Commands: 9th Panzerlehr Brig; PlaFüStab in the Federal Ministry of Defence
- Conflicts: War in Afghanistan
- Awards: Armed Forces Deployment Medal (SFOR & ISAF); NATO Medal (SFOR); NATO Medal (ISAF)

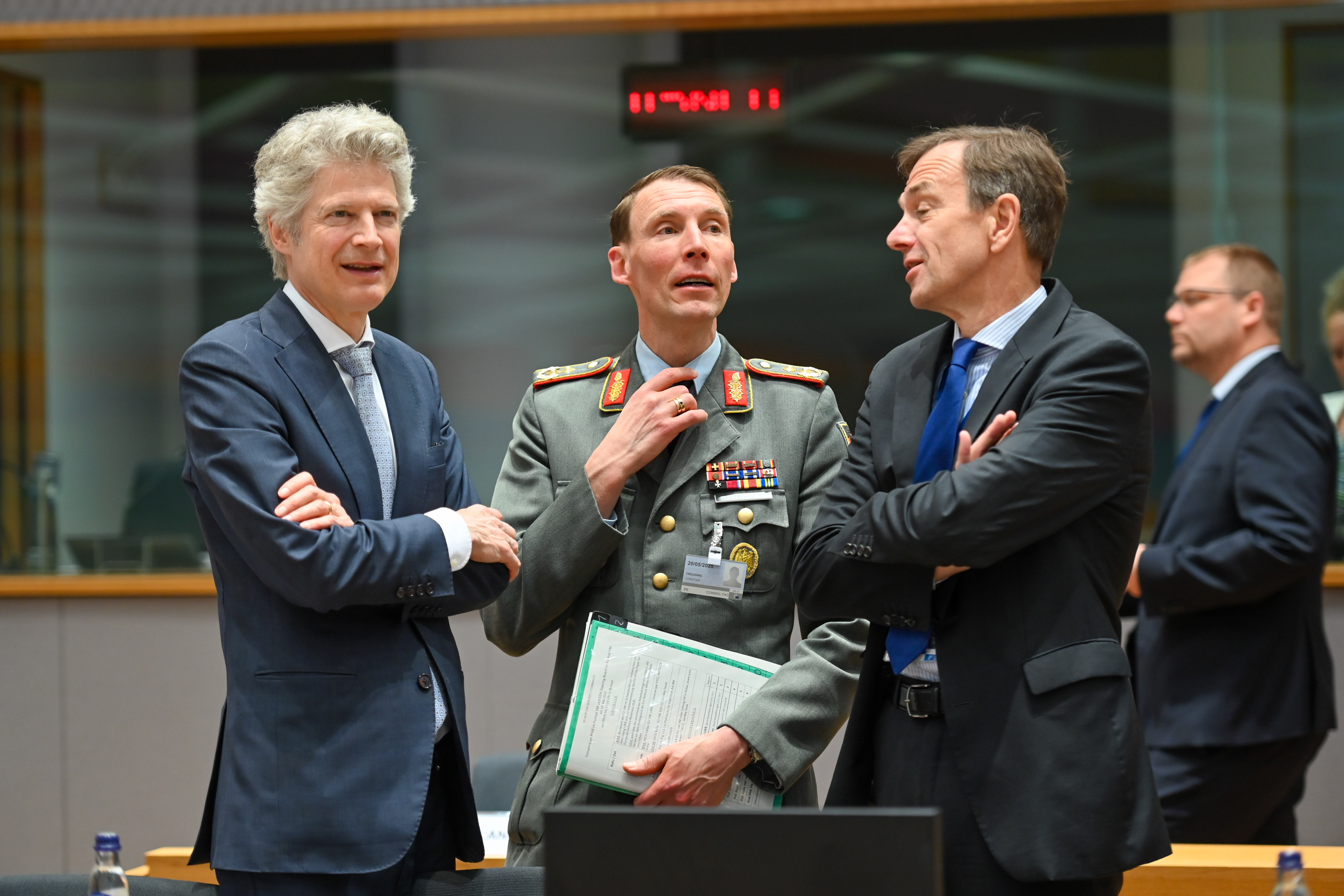
FAC Defence 20 May 2025 Christian Freuding

Christian Freuding (born 20 August 1971) is a German Army Generalleutnant and the Inspector of the Army since October 2025. Prior to that, Freuding served as a commanding officer of the planning and leadership staff of the Federal Ministry of Defence and commander of the 9th Panzerlehr Brig.

== Military career ==
Freuding joined the Bundeswehr in 1990; he executed his training as an officer with Armored Reconnaissance Battalion 12 in Ebern, Bavaria and at the Armoured Corps Training Centre (Panzertruppenschule) in Munster, Lower-Saxony.

Subsequently, he studied political science at the Bundeswehr University Hamburg. In 1998, he served as a platoon leader with Armored Reconnaissance Training Battalion 3 in Lüneburg.

In 1999, he earned his doctorate (Dr. phil.) under the supervision of Manfred Knapp at the Helmut Schmidt University/Bundeswehr University Hamburg, with a dissertation titled: "Germany in World Politics: The Federal Republic of Germany as a Non-Permanent Member of the United Nations Security Council in the Years 1977/78, 1987/88, and 1995/96."

From 2008 to 2009 he was chief of staff at Provincial Reconstruction Team (PRT) of ISAF in Kundus, Afghanistan.

=== Head of Ukraine Situation Room and Planning and Command Staff of Bundeswehr ===
With the Russian invasion of Ukraine in 2022 Christian Freuding became the head of "Lagezentrum Ukraine" (Ukraine Situation Center) within the Federal Ministry of Defence, responsible for collecting information and coordinating the support of Ukraine defence support. In that context he got some public attention by regularly appearing from 2022 to 2025 in episodes of the Bundeswehr produced media format "Nachgefragt" (Ask here), explaining various aspects of the conflict to the public.

When Boris Pistorius (SPD) assumed the position of Minister of Defence in 2023, he ordered a reorganization of the Ministry of defence in April 2023 to implement the political and military "Zeitenwende" (watershed moment) more rapidly and vigorously. The new staff was placed directly under the Ministry’s leadership and has since served as the central strategic steering and coordination hub between the Minister, the State Secretaries, and the Inspector General. Freuding was appointed as the first head of this new Planning and Command Staff, a role he has held since the summer of 2023.

In April 2023 Freuding was appointed by Minister of Defence Boris Pistorius to command the newly installed "Planungs- und Führungsstab" (planning- and leadership staff) within the Federal Ministry of Defence.

=== Inspector of the Army ===
Flag of Inspekteur Heer Bundeswehr, the commander and highest ranking officer of the German Army.

In early July 2025 the Federal Ministry of Defence announced that Generalleutnant Alfons Mais, Inspector of the Army, will leave office in October 2025 and that Christian Freuding is his designated successor.

Freuding took command as Inspector of the Army on 1 October 2025. On 5 November 2026 the Minstry of defence announced that Freuding will succeed Carsten Breuer as Inspector General of the Bundeswehr in February 2027.

== Dates of promotion ==
Insignia	Rank	Date
	Brigadier General	June 2020
	Major General	May 2023
	Lieutenant General	October 2025
