= Alfred Müller (general) =

German military officer and Knight's Cross recipient (1915–1997)

- Born: 23 November 1915; Kaltensondheim, Bavaria, Germany
- Died: 2 July 1997 (aged 81); Münster, North Rhine-Westphalia, Germany
- Military career
- Allegiance: Germany; West Germany
- Branch: German Army; Bundeswehr
- Rank: Oberstleutnant (Wehrmacht); Brigadegeneral (Bundeswehr)
- Commands: Panzerlehrbrigade 9
- Conflicts: World War II; Invasion of Poland; Battle of France; Battle of Dunkirk; Operation Barbarossa; Battle of Stalingrad; Battle of the Caucasus; Crimean Offensive
- Awards: Knight's Cross of the Iron Cross with Oak Leaves

Alfred Müller (23 November 1915 – 2 July 1997) was a general in the Bundeswehr of West Germany. During World War II, he served as an officer in the Wehrmacht and was a recipient of the Knight's Cross of the Iron Cross with Oak Leaves of Nazi Germany.

== Awards and decorations ==
- Iron Cross (1939)
  - 2nd Class (11 October 1939)
  - 1st Class (25 July 1941)
- Wound Badge (1939)
  - in Black (7 June 1943)
- General Assault Badge (29 August 1941)
- Kuban Shield (1 December 1944)
- Order of Michael the Brave
  - 3rd Class (28 January 1944)
- Knight's Cross of the Iron Cross with Oak Leaves
  - Knight's Cross on 20 February 1943 as Hauptmann and commander of Sturmgeschütz-Batterie 901
  - 354th Oak Leaves on 15 December 1943 as Hauptmann and commander of Sturmgeschütz-Abteilung 191
- Order of Merit of the Federal Republic of Germany (22 February 1973)
