= Gerd Schultze-Rhonhof =

German author and former army major general

- Born: Gerd Schultze-Rhonhof; 26 May 1939 (age 85); Weimar, Germany
- Occupation(s): Author, historian, lecturer

Gerd Schultze-Rhonhof (born 26 May 1939) is a German author and former Generalmajor in the German Army of the Bundeswehr, who, like Udo Walendy, also disputes Germany's sole guilt for the Second World War.

== Biography ==
Schultze-Rhonhof was born in Weimar. He entered military service in 1959 a few years after the Bundeswehr was founded. When he retired in 1996, he was Territorial Commander-in-chief in charge of Lower Saxony and Bremen and held the rank of Generalmajor (Major General).

The year before, he gained prominence by publicly criticizing the verdict of the Federal Constitutional Court's ruling that the statement "soldiers are murderers" is protected free speech. Schultze-Rhonhof said that he had retired from the military due to his opposition to the verdict. He also left the evangelical church after bishop Wolfgang Huber called for an exclusion of Martin Hohmann from the CDU.

In recent years, Schultze-Rhonhof has published several works on the history of the Causes of World War II in Europe. In this context, in May 2006 he and historians Stefan Scheil and Walter Post took part in a conference organized by the publishers Wigbert Grabert and Gert Sudholt under the title "Wollte Adolf Hitler den Krieg?" (Did Adolf Hitler want the war?).

== 1939 – Der Krieg, der viele Väter hatte (The War which had many Fathers) ==
In his book Der Krieg, der viele Väter hatte, Schultze-Rhonhof argues that Adolf Hitler had not wanted to risk war right up to September 1939. In effect, he lays the blame for the outbreak of World War II substantially with Poland, citing its rejection of German offers to negotiate over the Danzig question and the Polish corridor. In addition, he notes that Great Britain, France, the United States and the Soviet Union all played a part in causing the outbreak of war given their role in encouraging Polish intransigence in the face of German requests, most especially through Britain's "guarantee" of Polish security in the event of war.

While admitting that his own book is not the work of an academic historian, Schultze-Rhonhof nonetheless accuses mainstream German historians of failing to give a balanced and accurate accounting the origins of World War II. He maintains that official publications such as the Documents on German Foreign Policy have been manipulated, and that even today German academic history and educational publishers are forced to maintain Germany’s sole responsibility for the outbreak of the war. Schultze-Rhonhof’s book is therefore accused of being revisionist literature on the origins of World War II, the most famous example of which is perhaps A.J.P. Taylor’s The Origins of the Second World War.

The bibliography numbers 178 titles, and includes works by authors typically excluded as "revisionist" or "extreme-right" by academic historians; examples include such authors as David L. Hoggan, Paul Rassinier and Erich Kern, as well as various German conservatives. Little new archival research is presented by Schultze-Rhonhof in the book. Rather, he focuses on previously available printed documents from the foreign policy archives of the contending nations in order to develop an alternative analysis of the events leading to the outbreak of World War II.

The 2009 German documentary by Alphart Geyer, Hitlers Krieg? Was Guido Knopp Verschweigt, and translated into English, is based on Schultze-Rhonhof' books, 1939 – The War That Had Many Fathers, and An inevitable War? – The Road to September 1, 1939.

== Reception ==
Schultze-Rhonhofs book has been reviewed by German newspapers as Die Welt and Frankfurter Allgemeine Zeitung. The Die Welt article criticizes the book for questioning the Hossbach Memorandum as presented during the Nuremberg trials because according to Schultze-Rhonhof, several defendants at the Nuremberg trials disputed the accuracy of the text presented and their lawyers were not allowed to examine it. A review by historian Dr. Stefan Scheil in the right-wing weekly newspaper Junge Freiheit judged Schultze-Rhonhofs work positively. The book 'The Czech-German Drama 1918 to 1939' from 2008 was also well received by Scheil.

== Works ==
- 1939 – Der Krieg, der viele Väter hatte – Der lange Anlauf zum Zweiten Weltkrieg, 4th ed. 2003.
- 1939 – The War That Had Many Fathers, translated by George F. Held, 2011.
- Wozu noch tapfer sein? (Why not be Brave?), Verlag Ingo Resch, Gräfelfing 1997, ISBN 3-930039-64-8.,
- Der zweite Dreißigjährige Krieg (The Second Thirty Years' War), 2 Audio-CDs,
- Ein unvermeidlicher Krieg? – Der Weg zum 1. September 1939 (An inevitable War? – The Road to September 1, 1939). VHS-Video-Dokumentation, ZeitReisen Verlag, Bochum 2007.
- Deutschland auf Augenhöhe: Götz Kubitschek im Gespräch mit Gerd Schultze-Rhonhof. (Germany at Eye Level: Götz Kubitschek in Conversation with Gerd Schultze-Rhonhof) Edition Antaios, Schnellroda 2007, ISBN 978-3-935063-63-0. written with Götz Kubitschek.
- Das tschechisch-deutsche Drama 1918–1939: Errichtung und Zusammenbruch eines Vielvölkerstaates als Vorspiel zum Zweiten Weltkrieg. (The Czech-German Drama 1918-1939: Construction and collapse of a multi-ethnic state as a prelude to the Second World War). Olzog Verlag, München 2008, ISBN 978-3-7892-8365-9.

== Notes ==
Military offices
Preceded by Generalmajor Winfried Weick	Commander of 3rd Panzer Division (Bundeswehr); 12 September 1991 – 30 September 1994	Unit abolished
