= Udo Walendy =

German Holocaust denier (1927–2022)

- Born: Udo Walendy; 21 January 1927; Berlin, Brandenburg, Prussia, Germany
- Died: 17 November 2022 (aged 95); Berlin, Germany
- Occupations: Author, soldier, holocaust denier
- Criminal status: Incitement to hatred

Udo Walendy (21 January 1927 – 17 November 2022) was a German Holocaust denier. Like Gerd Schultze-Rhonhof, he disputed Germany's guilt for the Second World War.

== Life ==
Walendy was born in Berlin on 21 January 1927.

Towards the end of the war Walendy was drafted first into the Reichsarbeitsdienst (auxiliary force), then the Luftwaffenhelfer (child soldier in the air force) and finally into the regular Wehrmacht (the German military). He completed his Abitur (secondary education) in 1946 and then went to journalism school in Aachen. From 1950 to 1956 he studied political science at the Hochschule für Politik in West Berlin, where he received his diploma.

Afterwards he worked as the director of a folk high school in Herford and as the business leader of an employers' association in Bielefeld. In 1965 he went independent and founded the Verlag für Volkstum und Zeitgeschichtsforschung ("Publishing House for Folklore and Contemporary Historical Research") in Vlotho. In 1999 ownership of the publishing house was transferred to his wife, since Walendy was barred from directing it due to his conviction and imprisonment for 15 months for publicly questioning the Holocaust. He maintained close contact with the Belgian revisionist organisation Vrij Historisch Onderzoek (VHO).

== Activity as author and publisher ==
Besides other works Walendy oversaw the publication of numerous materials in which the Holocaust was denied and the Third Reich was generally presented in a positive light. Among others these include:

- As early as 1964 he published his own book, Wahrheit für Deutschland – Die Schuldfrage des Zweiten Weltkriegs (Truth for Germany – The Question of Guilt for the Second World War), which in 1979 was listed by Germany's Federal Department for Media Harmful to Young Persons as material that could not be publicly advertised or given to young readers, due to the version it presented of the events that led to World War II. This restriction was lifted in 1994, after a long legal battle, on the grounds that Walendy's constitutional rights had been violated, since the federal constitutional court ruled that even a supposedly biased representation could be defended as an academic work. A renewed attempt to have the work listed was abandoned in 2001 due to a negative assessment of the chances of success in the event of another court case.
- Numerous copies of the historical revisionist magazine series Historische Tatsachen, which continues to be published by the Vrij Historisch Onderzoek (VHO) in Flanders. Its very first edition from 1974 contains a German translation of Richard Harwood's Holocaust-denying booklet "Did Six Million Really Die?".
- The German translation of Arthur Butz's book The Hoax of the Twentieth Century, in which the author attempts to discredit the evidence for the Holocaust.

Walendy was charged with criminal activity several times, including under Germany's Volksverhetzung law (incitement to hatred).

On 1 September 2014, Germar Rudolf's Castle Hill Publishers (UK) reprinted Truth for Germany – The Question of Guilt for the Second World War in an updated expanded, and corrected second edition, as Who Started World War II: Truth for a War-Torn World, which has also been translated anew from the German original.

== Written works ==
- Who Started World War II: Truth for a War-Torn World (an updated, expanded, newly translated and corrected edition of Truth for Germany – The Question of Guilt for the Second World War), Castle Hill Publishers, 1 September 2014, ISBN 978-1591480723.
- Dissecting the Holocaust: The Growing Critique of ‘Truth’ and ‘Memory’ (contributor)
- Forged War Crimes Malign the German Nation
- Truth for Germany – The Question of Guilt for the Second World War (Wahrheit für Deutschland – Die Schuldfrage des Zweiten Weltkriegs), originally published in 1964. Reprint by the Barnes Review with original title from the translators’ file without any editing or changes in layout, 2013, ISBN 978-1937787202.

== Notes ==
Much of this article is translated from the German wikipedia article of 2 March 2007
