= Jörg Schönbohm =

German general (1937–2019)

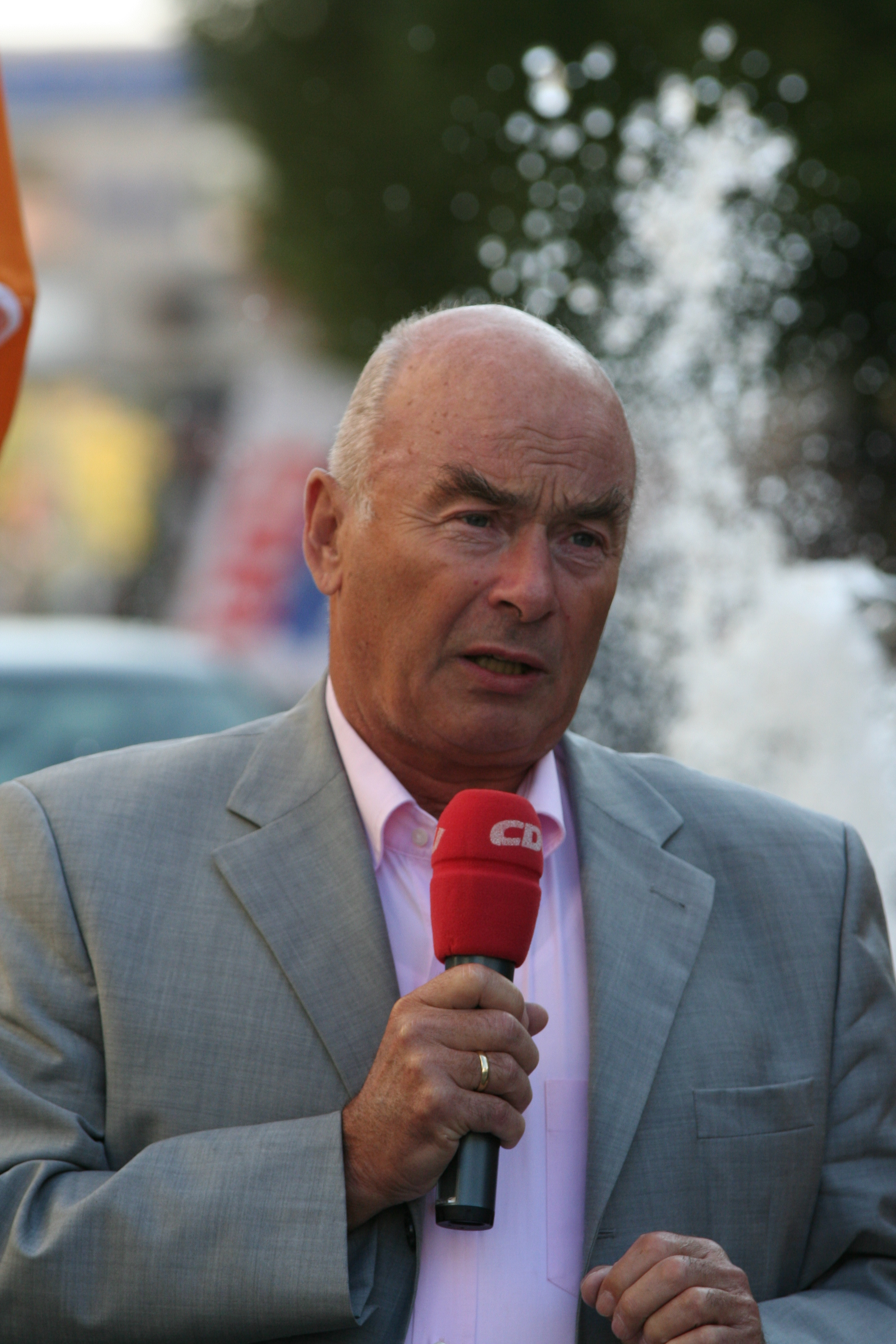

Deputy Minister-President of Brandenburg
- In office 13 October 1999 – 19 February 2009
- Minister-President: Manfred Stolpe; Matthias Platzeck
- Preceded by: Alwin Ziel
- Succeeded by: Ulrich Junghanns

Minister of the Interior of Brandenburg
- In office 13 October 1999 – 6 November 2009
- Minister-President: Manfred Stolpe; Matthias Platzeck
- Preceded by: Alwin Ziel
- Succeeded by: Rainer Speer

Senator for the Interior of Berlin
- In office 25 January 1996 – 12 November 1998
- Governing Mayor: Eberhard Diepgen
- Preceded by: Dieter Heckelmann
- Succeeded by: Eckart Werthebach

Inspector of the Army
- In office 17 October 1991 – 18 February 1992
- Deputy: Harald Schulz
- Preceded by: Henning von Ondarza
- Succeeded by: Helge Hansen

Personal details
- Born: 2 September 1937 Bad Saarow, Nazi Germany
- Died: 7 February 2019 (aged 81) Kleinmachnow, Germany
- Party: Christian Democratic Union

Jörg Schönbohm (2 September 1937 – 7 February 2019) was a German politician (CDU) and a retired lieutenant general. He was the first commander of the Bundeswehr Kommando Ost (short: BwKdo Ost) Federal Armed Forces Command East (command level XXX, 1990-1991), which supervised the absorption of the East German National People's Army into the Federal German armed forces (Bundeswehr) as part of the Army of Unity (Armee der Einheit). In 1991 he became the Inspector of the Army, the highest-ranking officer in the German Army; he was retired in 1992 to become Undersecretary for Security Policy in the Federal Ministry of Defence. From 1996 to 1998 Schönbohm was Senator of the Interior for the city of Berlin, and from 1999 to 2009 he held the same office as interior minister for the state of Brandenburg.

== Personal life ==
Schönbohm was Protestant, and married with three children. He resided in Kleinmachnow in Potsdam-Mittelmark. His son Arne Schönbohm became president of the German Federal Office for Information Security in 2016. Jörg Schönbohm died on 7 February 2019 at the age of 81.

== Awards ==
- 2009 – Manfred Wörner Medal

== Works ==
- Jörg Schönbohm, Two Armies and One Fatherland: The End of the Nationale Volksarmee, Berghahn Books, 1996, ISBN 1-57181-069-2, ISBN 978-1-57181-069-4

Military offices
Preceded by Generalleutnant Henning von Ondarza	Inspector of the Army; 27 October 1991–18 February 1992	Succeeded by Generalleutnant Helge Hansen
Preceded by Generalmajor Harald Schulz	Commander of 3rd Panzer Division (Bundeswehr); 11 March 1988 – 5 January 1989	Succeeded by Generalmajor Winfried Weick
