= Alfons Mais =

German Army general (born 1962)

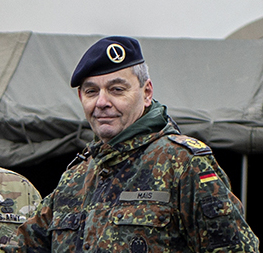
- Alfons Mais in 2020
- Born: Alfons Mais; April 24, 1962 (age 64); Koblenz, Rhineland-Palatinate, Germany
- Education: Helmut Schmidt University (BS)
- Children: 1
- Military career
- Allegiance: Germany
- Branch: German Army
- Service years: 1981–2025
- Rank: Lieutenant general
- Commands: FlgAbt 101; 1st Airmobile Brigade; School of Army Aviation; I German/Dutch Corps
- Conflicts: KFOR; War in Afghanistan (ISAF)
- Awards: Armed Forces Deployment Medal (SFOR & ISAF); NATO Medal (KFOR); NATO Medal (ISAF); NATO Medal (Resolute Support); Legion of Honour (officer); Legion of Merit (commander)

Alfons Mais (born 24 April 1962) is a retired German Army Generalleutnant who was the Inspector of the Army from February 2020 to September 2025.

== Military career ==
Alfons Mais joined the Bundeswehr in 1981 and served with the Army Aviation Training Center in Bückeburg, where he started as an Officer candidate. From 1982 to 1985 he studied Economics and Organizational Sciences at the University of the German Federal Armed Forces. From 1985 to 1987 he was trained in Hannover and Bückeburg to become a helicopter pilot, followed by an assignment as Alouette II pilot at the Niederstetten Air Base from 1987 to 1989. He became adjutant to the commander of the Army Office in Cologne until 1991, when Mais was transferred to Fassberg where he commanded a squadron, the Heeresfliegerversorgungsstaffel 105. After staff officer training and a deployment with the Luftmechanisierten Brigade 1, he was part of the Stabilisation Force in Bosnia and Herzegovina, before becoming commanding officer of the Fliegenden Abteilung 101 in 2000. From 2001 to 2002 he commanded a mixed air force unit with KFOR in Topliçan.

He became a teacher at the Bundeswehr Command and Staff College from 2002 to 2004, followed by various staff assignments, and in 2007, an additional role as chairman of the EU/NATO Capability Group in Brussels. From 2011 to 2013 he commanded the 1st Airmobile Brigade, including a deployment to Afghanistan with ISAF in 2012/2013. In 2013 he took command of the Heeresfliegerwaffenschule in Bückeburg. In 2014 Mais became chief of staff with the Army Command in Strausberg, followed in 2018 by the role of C/O with the NATO Resolute Support Mission in Afghanistan. In 2019 he became commanding officer of the I German/Dutch Corps in Münster, before being chosen as Inspector of the Army in 2020.

== Criticism ==
After the Russian invasion of Ukraine in 2022, Alfons Mais stated on Linkedin, that the German army was not ready to deal with the upcoming challenges. He wrote: "We all saw it coming, but were unable to get through with our arguments, to learn the lessons from the Annexation of Crimea (in 2014) and make the changes. That doesnt feel right. (...)"

Mais pushed for the deployment of the 45th Panzer Brigade in Lithuania but got criticized for not getting the army into state of the art Drone warfare fast enough. In early July 2025 the Federal Ministry of Defence announced, that Mais will be replaced as Inspector of the Army by Christian Freuding, a close confidant of minister of defence Boris Pistorius.

== Dates of promotion ==
Insignia	Rank	Date
	Brigadier General	
	Major General	
	Lieutenant General	
