= Richard Rossmanith =

German Army officer (born 1955)

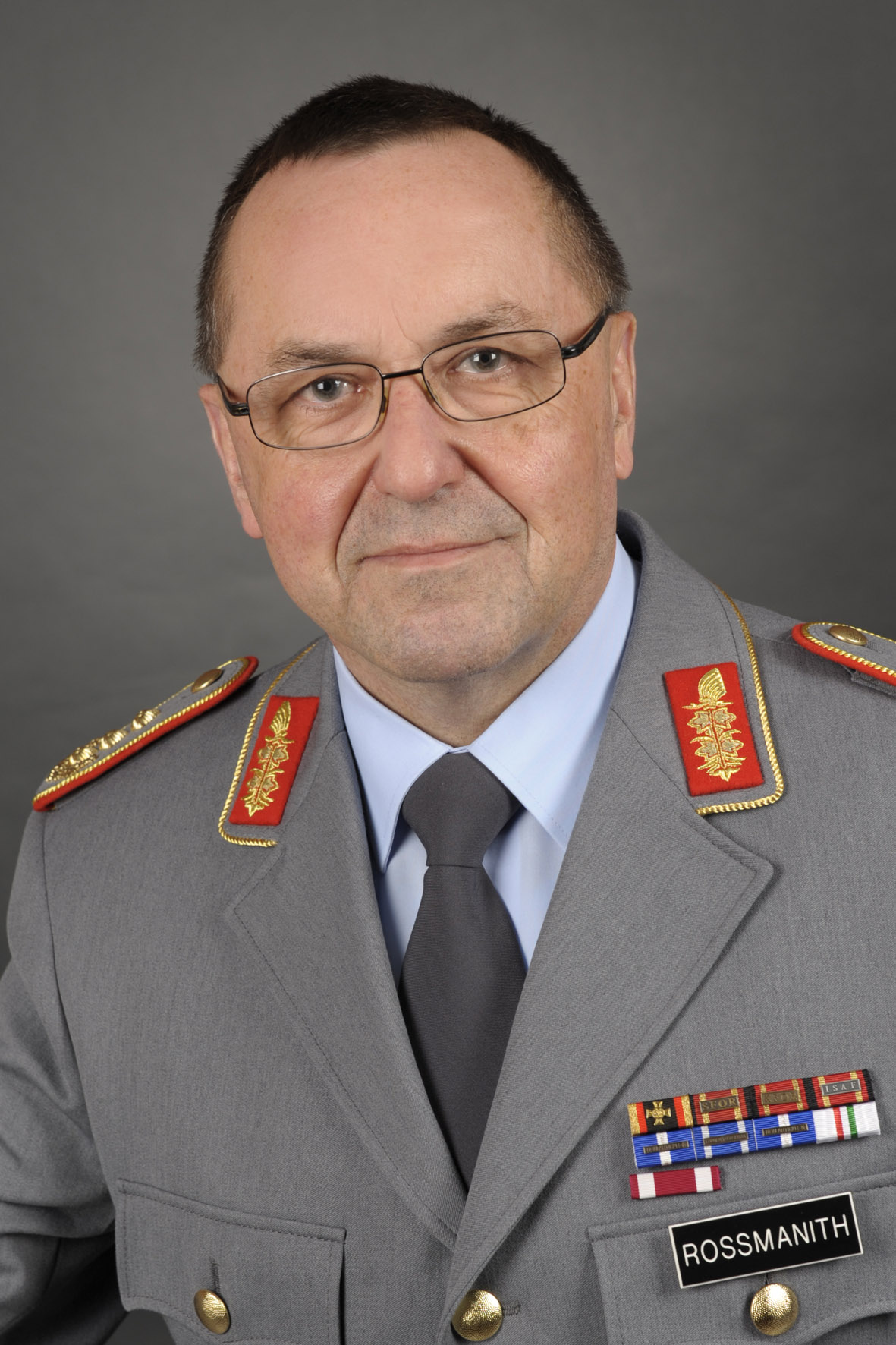
- Born: 16 March 1955 (age 71)
- Military career
- Allegiance: Germany
- Branch: German Army
- Service years: 1973–present
- Rank: Lieutenant General
- Conflicts: War in Afghanistan (2001–present)

Lieutenant General Richard Rossmanith (born 16 March 1955 in Monheim, Donau-Ries district) is a German Army officer and currently Commander of the Multinational Joint Headquarters Ulm in Ulm, Germany.

== Military career ==
Rossmanith joined the Army in 1973, joining a light infantry unit based in Munich. After attending studies in electrical engineering at the University of the Bundeswehr Munich, he became commanding officer of Light Infantry Battalion 112 in 1977, stationed in Regen, Bavaria. Between 1981 and 1985, Rossmanith served as a company commander, taking charge of the 2nd and later the 4th companies of the Panzergrenadier Battalion, again stationed in Regen.

Following company command, Rossmanith attended the Command and General and Staff Officers' Course in Hamburg, from which he graduated in 1987. He served in Brussels, Belgium, on his first assignment to NATO in 1987, serving as Desk Officer for Politico Military Affairs to the German Military Representative to the Military Committee. Returning to Germany, he served with Armoured Brigade 6, stationed in Hofgeismar, Hesse, in 1989, before being appointed Chief of Staff for 4 Panzergrenadier Division, based in Erfurt, Thuringia.

He took up his second assignment to NATO in 1991 and served as a branch chief at Headquarters, Allied Forces Baltic Approaches (BALTAP), in Karup Municipality, Denmark, where he served until 1993. He went on to serve in a staff position at the Federal Ministry of Defence in a variety of staff positions, before taking command of Panzergrenadier Battalion 212 in Augustdorf, North Rhine-Westphalia, between 1995 and 1997. In early 1997, he served with the German National Contingent of the NATO-led Stabilisation Force in the Balkans, after which he served with the German 7 Armoured Division, based in Düsseldorf, until 1999.

== High command ==
Between October 1999 and May 2003, Rossmanith held a variety of staff posts, after which he took command of 9 Armoured Brigade, based in Münster, and deployed for a second tour in the Balkans, commanding Multinational Brigade Southwest, part of the Kosovo Force. He held the command until 2005, when he was appointed Deputy Director, Policy Planning and Advisory Staff at the Ministry of Defence, after which he became Chairman for Deployable Forces Coordination Group at Supreme Headquarters Allied Powers Europe (SHAPE) until 2009. He then took up his fourth NATO position, as the first-ever Chief of Staff of Deployable Joint Staff Element 1, Allied Land Component Command in Heidelberg.

He took command of the stability division of the International Security Assistance Force (ISAF), succeeding Maj. Gen. (ITA Army) Claudio Mora, in October 2010.

In December 2012, Rossmanith took command of the Response Forces Operations Command (since July 2013: Multinational Joint Headquarters Ulm) in Ulm, Germany.

== Awards and decorations ==
- Badge of Honour of the Bundeswehr in Gold
- NATO Medal
- German Armed Forces Deployment Medal
  - SFOR clasp
  - KFOR clasp
  - ISAF clasp
- U.S. Meritorious Service Medal
