= Hermann Wulf =

West German army general (1915–1990)

Dr. med. Hermann Wulf
- Born: 25 July 1915; Eichede
- Died: 19 May 1990 (aged 74); Norderstedt
- Military career
- Allegiance: Nazi Germany (1945); West Germany
- Branch: Army
- Service years: 1934–45; 1956–71
- Rank: Oberstleutnant (Wehrmacht); Brigadegeneral (Bundeswehr)
- Conflicts: World War II
- Awards: Knight's Cross of the Iron Cross with Oak Leaves

Hermann Wulf (25 July 1915 – 19 May 1990) was an officer in the Wehrmacht of Nazi Germany during World War II and a Brigadegeneral in the Bundeswehr.

Wulf was also a recipient of the Knight's Cross of the Iron Cross with Oak Leaves.

== Awards and decorations ==
- Iron Cross (1939) 2nd Class (15 September 1939) & 1st Class (21 June 1940)
- Honour Roll Clasp of the Army (5 February 1945)
- Close Combat Clasp in Gold (18 May 1944)
- Knight's Cross of the Iron Cross with Oak Leaves
  - Knight's Cross on 13 October 1941 as Oberleutnant and Chef 9./Infanterie-Regiment 76
  - 520th Oak Leaves on 3 July 1944 as Major and commander of the III./Grenadier-Regiment 76 (motorized)
