= Stabilisation forces =

One of 3 types of forces in the Bundeswehr (German armed forces)

Stabilisation forces (German: Stabilisierungskräfte) are one of the three categories of forces in the Bundeswehr (armed forces of Germany), that classify formations according to their levels of equipment, readiness, training and capability. The other categories are intervention forces (Eingreifkräfte) and support forces (Unterstützungskräften). The stabilisation forces comprise some 70,000 service personnel, of which up to 14,000 are deployable in up to five different regions for limited periods of time.

== Mission ==
Stabilisation forces provide troops for multi-national, joint military operations of low to medium intensity. In contrast to intervention forces they are intended for peacekeeping operations of longer duration. That said, for operations whose aim is conflict prevention and crisis management, these two categories of forces can also be deployed simultaneously or in close succession and are therefore able to work in combination. Within the framework of peacekeeping operations the preconditions for the construction of state or commercial structures ("Nation Building") need to be satisfied. To achieve this the warring parties are separated and the population protected. These operations can reduce the risk of escalation to fighting, so that the forces can engage in combat up to the level of a reinforced combat formation both against organised, military opponents as well as asymmetric forces. Sustainability in fighting such opponents is also ensured within the German Army by use of integrated armoured forces. Because they take part in overseas operations, stabilisation forces mainly consist of professional career soldiers (Berufssoldaten) and short-service volunteers (Zeitsoldaten).

== ORBAT ==
=== Army ===
Within the German Army the following formations belong in toto to the stabilisation forces:

- 10th Armoured Division (10. Panzerdivision)
- 13th Mechanized Infantry Division (13. Panzergrenadierdivision)

The following formations are partly classified as stabilisation forces. The formations that do not belong to them, but to the intervention forces are enumerated in detail there.

- Airmobile Operations Division
- Special Operations Division
