= Rapid Forces Division =

Coordinates: 49°00′24.66″N 12°07′22.07″E

- German: Division Schnelle Kräfte
- Division Schnelle Kräfte Shoulder Insignia
- Active: 1956–1994, 1994–2001; 2001–present (DSK since 1 January 2014)
- Country: Germany; Netherlands (since 2014); Czech Republic (since 2017); Romania (since 2017)
- Allegiance: Germany
- Branch: Army
- Type: Rapid deployment force Special forces
- Size: 20,000; of which 2,300 Dutch
- Part of: German Army
- Garrison/HQ: Stadtallendorf
- Mottos: Ready for action, at any time, worldwide! Einsatzbereit, jederzeit, weltweit!
- Anniversaries: April 1, 2001
- Engagements: Somalian Civil War; Bosnian Civil War; 1997 Albanian civil unrest Kosovo War; Afghanistan War: Operation Enduring Freedom; Operation Anaconda; Operation Harekate Yolo I; Operation Harekate Yolo II; Operation Oqab; Operation Gala-e Gorg; Congolese Civil War

Commanders
- Current commander: Major General Jared Sembritzki
- Notable commanders: Lieutenant General Hans-Otto Budde; Lieutenant General Jörg Vollmer

The Rapid Forces Division (German: Division Schnelle Kräfte), formerly Special Operations Division (Division Spezielle Operationen), is an airborne division of the German Army that was activated in 2001 and received its current designation in 2014.

Its headquarters staff is based at Stadtallendorf. It was created as 1st Airborne Division (1. Luftlandedivision) in 1956 and reflagged twice in 1994 and 2001 as Airmobile Forces Command/4th Division (Kommando Luftbewegliche Kräfte/4. Division), Special Operations Division and eventually Rapid Forces Division. The division leads three combat brigades and special forces troops, all of which are fully air-mobile.

In June 2014, the Dutch 11th Air Mobile Brigade was fully integrated into the division as part of the binational military cooperation between Germany and the Netherlands, and in 2017 the Romanian 81st Mechanized Brigade and the Czech 4th Rapid Deployment Brigade followed suit.

== History ==
Created in 1956, 1st Airborne Division's main tasks were to act as the backbone of counterattacks behind the enemy lines of the Warsaw Pact and to respond to hostile breaks through allied front lines. The very first commanders of this unit were illustrious paratrooper generals such as Bern von Baer and Hans Kroh, both recipients of the Knight's Cross of the Iron Cross. The 1st Airborne Division existed throughout the Cold War and was disbanded in 1994. The capability for air-transportable forces was eventually replaced by Airmobile Forces Command/4th Division, a division-sized formation the duties of which shifted to more complex scenarios of current days.

This happened mainly because of two incidents in 1994 and 1997 where German citizens had to be rescued from Rwanda and Albania, once even by foreign troops as the German military lacked adequate forces to carry out evacuation operations on their own. One of the three existing brigades (Airborne Brigade 25 "Black Forest") was drawn on to provide the headquarters for the German Army's new special forces unit, the Kommando Spezialkräfte.

The first overseas deployment of this division took place in 1961 when its troops rendered humanitarian assistance to Morocco after a devastating earthquake. From there on 1st Airborne Division or its successors deployed troops to Somalia, Croatia, Albania, Bosnia, Kosovo, Afghanistan and Congo. The paratroopers saw extensive action in Afghanistan. With four of the nation's highest awards for gallantry—among others—having been awarded to its members, the division's Paratrooper Battalion 263 is the most decorated unit of the German Army.

Following the restructuring of the German armed forces, the Special Operations Division was transferred into the new Rapid Forces Division (German: Division Schnelle Kräfte).

In June 2014 the 11 Luchtmobiele Brigade (11th Airmobile Brigade) of the Royal Netherlands Army joined the division. The Dutch forces will remain stationed in the Netherlands but will cooperate in training and exercises of their German counterparts.

== Organization ==
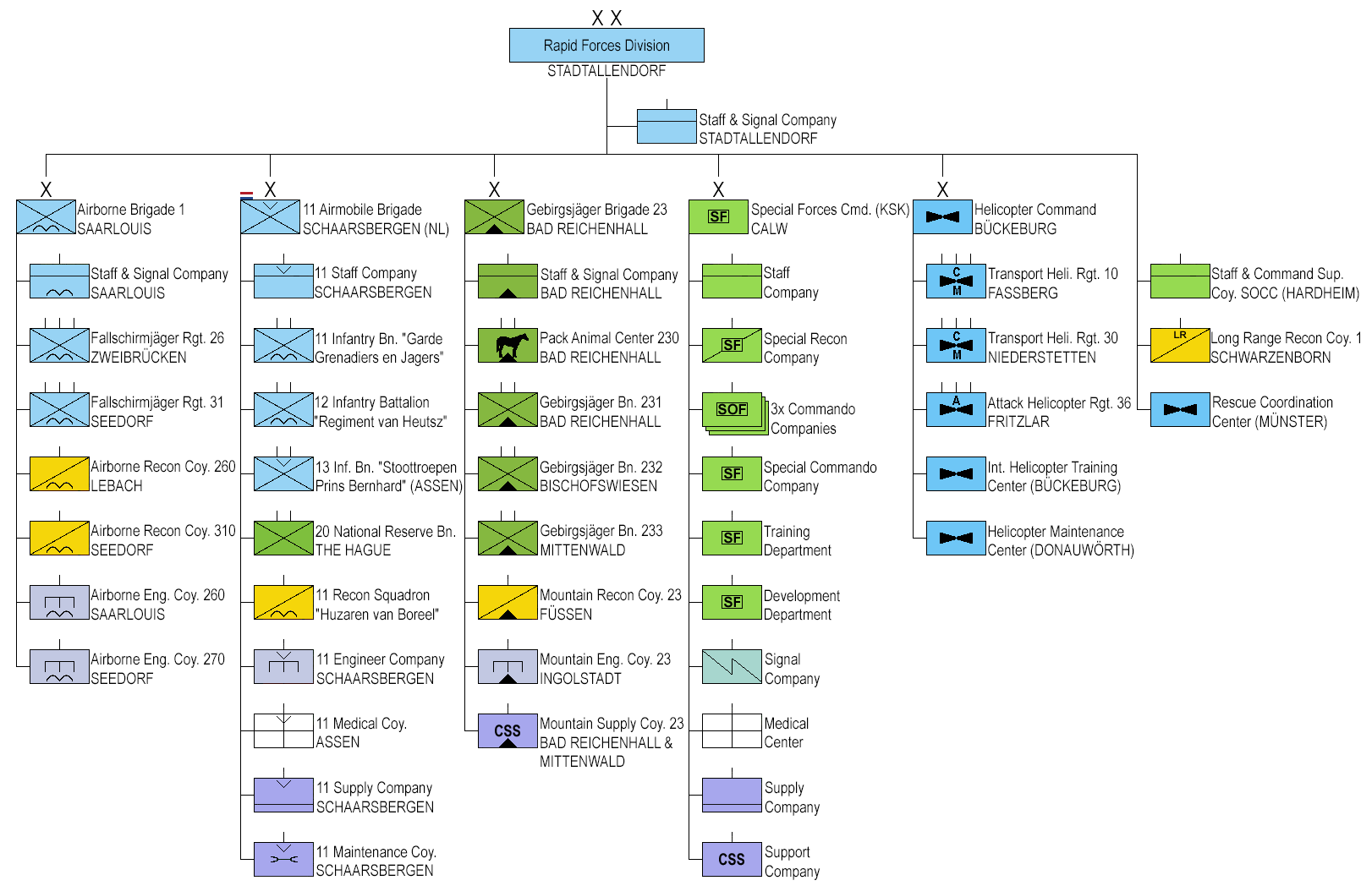
Rapid Forces Division with integrated Dutch units 2025

- Rapid Forces Division (Division Schnelle Kräfte), in Stadtallendorf
  - Staff and Signal Company, Rapid Forces Division, in Stadtallendorf
  - Airborne Brigade 1 (Luftlandebrigade 1), in Saarlouis
    - Fallschirmjäger Regiment 26 (Fallschirmjägerregiment 26), in Zweibrücken
    - Fallschirmjäger Regiment 31 (Fallschirmjägerregiment 31), in Seedorf
  - 11 Airmobile Brigade (11 Luchtmobiele Brigade), in Schaarsbergen
  - Mountain Brigade 23 (Gebirgsjägerbrigade 23), in Bad Reichenhall
  - Special Operations Forces (Kommando Spezialkräfte) (KSK), in Calw
  - Helicopter Command (Kommando Hubschrauber), in Bückeburg
    - Transport Helicopter Regiment 10 (Transporthubschrauberregiment 10), in Faßberg
    - Transport Helicopter Regiment 30 (Transporthubschrauberregiment 30), in Niederstetten
    - Attack Helicopter Regiment 36 (Kampfhubschrauberregiment 36), at Fritzlar Air Base
    - International Helicopter Training Centre (Internationales Hubschrauberausbildungszentrum), in Bückeburg
  - Staff and Command Support Company, Special Operations Component Command (SOCC), in Hardheim
  - Long Range Reconnaissance Company 1, in Schwarzenborn (activated 1 Oktober 2022)

== Geographic Distribution ==
Rapid Forces Division locations 2025:
Fallschirmjäger Gebirgsjäger Special Forces Reconnaissance Engineers Army Aviation Logistics
#1 Bad Reichenhall: Mountain Pack Animal Operations & Training Center 230, Gebirgsjäger Battalion 231, Mountain Supply Company 23
