= 41st Panzergrenadier Brigade =

Coordinates: 53.6437°N 14.0486°E

- Panzergrenadierbrigade 41
- Active: 1 April 1991 – Present
- Country: Germany
- Branch: Army
- Type: Panzergrenadier
- Size: Brigade

Insignia
NATO Map Symbol
41
1

The 41st Panzergrenadier Brigade is a brigade of the German Army.

On April 1, 1991 the 41st Homeland Security Brigade was established at Eggesin in Mecklenburg-Vorpommern, from the former Land Forces of the National People's Army 9th Panzer Division. On 27 June 1991 the "Vorpommern" title was awarded. In 1995, it was reclassified as Mechanized Infantry Brigade 41. After the installation of the brigade staff in 2002, the headquarters company and Panzer Battalion 413 moved to the Ferdinand von Schill barracks in Torgelow.

From 1991 to 2006, the 414 Panzer Battalion was active at Spechtberg.

== Organization ==
As of 1 March 2025 the brigade is organized as follows:

- Panzergrenadier Brigade 41 (Panzergrenadierbrigade 41), in Neubrandenburg
  - Staff and Signal Company Panzergrenadier Brigade 41 (Stabs- und Fernmeldekompanie Panzergrenadier Brigade 41), in Neubrandenburg
  - Reconnaissance Battalion 6 (Aufklärungsbataillon 6), in Eutin with Fennek reconnaissance vehicles and KZO drones
  - Panzergrenadier Battalion 401 (Panzergrenadierbataillon 401), in Hagenow with 44x Marder infantry fighting vehicles
  - Panzergrenadier Battalion 411 (Panzergrenadierbataillon 411), in Viereck with 44x Marder infantry fighting vehicles
  - Panzergrenadier Battalion 908 (Panzergrenadierbataillon 908), in Viereck (Reserve unit)
  - Panzer Engineer Battalion 803 (Panzerpionierbataillon 803), in Havelberg
  - Supply Battalion 142 (Versorgungsbataillon 142), in Hagenow
