= 3rd Panzer Division (Bundeswehr) =

Coordinates: 53.462012°N 9.686412°E

3rd Armoured Division (3. Panzerdivision)
- Formation sign
- Active: 2 July 1956 – 30 September 1994
- Country: Germany
- Allegiance: Bundeswehr
- Branch: German Army
- Type: Armoured division
- Garrison/HQ: Estetal Barracks, Buxtehude

Commanders
- Last Commander: Generalmajor Gerd Schultze-Rhonhof

The 3rd Armoured Division (German: 3. Panzerdivision) was formed on 2 July 1956 in Hamburg and was one of the first major formations of the new German Army or Bundeswehr after the Second World War. The 3rd Armoured Division was stationed on the North German Plain between the rivers Elbe and Weser. Its last headquarters location was Buxtehude. It was part of the I Corps alongside the 1st Panzer, 7th Panzer, and 11th Panzergrenadier Divisions.

The 3rd Armoured Division was disbanded on 30 September 1994. Its last commander was Generalmajor Gerd Schultze-Rhonhof.

In the 1980s under Army Structures III and IV the division consisted of the 7th Panzergrenadier Brigade, 8th Panzer Brigade, and the Panzerlehrbrigade 9 (Armoured demonstration brigade). After the division's disbandment 9 PzL Bde eventually became part of 1st Armoured Division (Germany).

== Operations ==
The Division provided support to numerous disasters, e. g. during serious floods in North Germany in 1962 and 1976 as well as the flooding of the Elbe Lateral Canal. In January 1979 elements of the Division were deployed during the emergency caused by heavy snowfall in North Germany.

In 1993 parts of the Division were deployed to Somalia as part of UNOSOM II.

== Divisional Organization 1989 ==
- 3rd Panzer Division, Buxtehude
  - Staff Company, 3rd Panzer Division, Buxtehude
  - 7th Panzergrenadier Brigade, Hamburg
    - Staff Company, 1st Panzergrenadier Brigade, Hamburg, (8× M577, 8× Luchs)
    - 71st Panzergrenadier Battalion (Reserve), Hamburg, (13× Leopard 1A5, 24× Marder, 12× M113)
    - 72nd Panzergrenadier Battalion, Hamburg, (24× Marder, 6× Panzermörser, 23× M113)
    - 73rd Panzergrenadier Battalion, Cuxhaven, (24× Marder, 6× Panzermörser, 23× M113)
    - 74th Panzer Battalion, Cuxhaven, (41× Leopard 2, 12× M113)
    - 75th Panzer Artillery Battalion, Hamburg, (18× M109A3G)
    - 70th Anti-Tank Company, Cuxhaven, (12× Jaguar 2)
    - 70th Armored Engineer Company, Stade
    - 70th Supply Company, Stade
    - 70th Maintenance Company, Stade
  - 8th Panzer Brigade, Lüneburg
    - Staff Company, 8th Panzer Brigade, Lüneburg, (8× M577, 8× Luchs)
    - 81st Panzer Battalion (Reserve), Lüneburg, (28× Leopard 2, 11× Marder, 12× M113)
    - 82nd Panzergrenadier Battalion, Lüneburg, (35× Marder, 6× Panzermörser, 12× M113)
    - 83rd Panzer Battalion, Lüneburg, (41× Leopard 2, 12× M113)
    - 84th Panzer Battalion, Lüneburg, (41× Leopard 2, 12× M113)
    - 85th Panzer Artillery Battalion, Lüneburg, (18× M109A3G)
    - 80th Anti-Tank Company, Lüneburg, (12× Jaguar 1)
    - 80th Armored Engineer Company, Lüneburg
    - 80th Supply Company, Lüneburg
    - 80th Maintenance Company, Lüneburg
  - 9th Panzer (Lehr) Brigade, Munster
    - Staff Company, 9th Panzerlehrbrigade, Munster, (8× M577, 8× Luchs)
    - 91st Panzer (Lehr) Battalion (Reserve), Munster, (28× Leopard 2, 11× Marder, 12× M113)
    - 92nd Panzergrenadier (Lehr) Battalion, Munster, (35× Marder, 6× Panzermörser, 12× M113)
    - 93rd Panzer (Lehr) Battalion, Munster, (41× Leopard 2, 12× M113)
    - 94th Panzer (Lehr) Battalion, Munster, (41× Leopard 2, 12× M113)
    - 95th Panzer (Lehr) Artillery Battalion, Munster, (18× M109A3G)
    - 90th Anti-Tank (Lehr) Company, Munster, (12× Jaguar 1)
    - 90th Armored Engineer (Lehr) Company, Munster
    - 90th Supply (Lehr) Company, Munster
    - 90th Maintenance (Lehr) Company, Munster
  - 3rd Artillery Regiment, Stade
    - Staff Battery, 3rd Artillery Regiment, Stade
    - 31st Field Artillery Battalion, Lüneburg, (18× M110A2, 18× FH-70)
    - 32nd Rocket Artillery Battalion, Dörverden, (16× LARS)
    - 33rd Surveillance Battalion, Stade, (12× CL89)
    - 3rd Infantry Battery, Dörverden
  - 3rd Armored Reconnaissance Battalion, Lüneburg, (34× Leopard 1, 10× Luchs, 18× Fuchs - 9 of which carry a RASIT radar)
  - 3rd Air Defense Regiment, Hamburg, (36× Gepard)
  - 3rd Engineer Battalion, Stade, (8× Biber AVLB, 8× Pionierpanzer 1, 4× Skorpion Mine Layers, 12× Floating Bridge Modules)
  - 3rd Army Aviation Squadron, Rotenburg, (10× Alouette II)
  - 3rd Signal Battalion, Buxtehude
  - 3rd Medical Battalion (Reserve), Hamburg
  - 3rd Supply Battalion (Reserve), Stade
  - 3rd Maintenance Battalion (Reserve), Rotenburg
  - 5× Field Replacement Battalions: 31st and 32nd in Zeven, 33rd and 35th in Verden, 34th in Neustadt am Achim
  - 36th Jäger Battalion (Reserve), Zeven
  - 37th Jäger Battalion (Reserve), Munster
  - 38th Security Battalion (Reserve), Zeven

== Commanders ==
No.	Name	Took over	Handed over
15	Generalmajor Gerd Schultze-Rhonhof	12 September 1991	30 September 1994
14	Generalmajor Winfried Weick	6 January 1989	11 September 1991
13	Generalmajor Jörg Schönbohm	11 March 1988	5 January 1989
12	Generalmajor Harald Schulz	1 April 1985	10 March 1988
11	Brigadegeneral Klaus Nennecke	7 December 1984	31 March 1985
10	Generalmajor Wolfgang Tebbe	1 April 1983	6 December 1984
9	Generalmajor Franz-Joachim von Rodde	1 April 1978	31 March 1983
8	Generalmajor Eberhard Burandt	1. October 1974	31 March 1978
7	Generalmajor Horst Ohrloff	1 October 1970	30 September 1974
6	Generalmajor Walter Carganico	1 October 1967	30 September 1970
5	Generalmajor Bernd Freytag von Loringhoven	1 April 1967	21 September 1967
4	Generalmajor Hans-Georg von Tempelhoff	1 October 1962	31 March 1967
3	Generalmajor Hans-Ullrich Krantz	1 October 1961	30 September 1962
2	Generalmajor Christian Müller	15 July 1958	20 September 1961
1	Generalmajor Heinrich Hax	3 September 1956	14 July 1958
