= Werner Freers =

German Army general

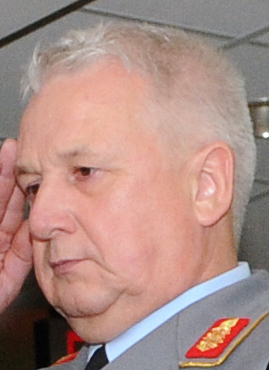
Werner Freers

Werner Freers (born 19 July 1954, Hämelerwald, Lehrte) is a German Army general and served as Chief of Staff of the Supreme Headquarters Allied Powers Europe from 2012 to 2017.
