= 1st Panzer Division (Bundeswehr) =

Armoured division of the modern-day German Army

Coordinates: 52°22′11.31″N 9°46′11.77″E

- 1. Panzerdivision
- 1st Armoured Division insignia
- Active: 1956–present
- Country: Germany; Netherlands
- Branch: Army
- Type: Panzer
- Size: 19,000 soldiers
- Part of: German Army
- Garrison/HQ: Oldenburg (Oldenburg)
- Nicknames: The first one Die Erste
- Mottos: Roughly: Go! Let's tackle it! Man drup - man to! (Low German)
- Anniversaries: July 1st 1956
- Engagements: Kosovo War; War in Afghanistan

Commanders
- Current commander: Generalmajor Heico Hübner
- Notable commanders: General Henning von Ondarza, COMAFCENT 1991–1994; General Helge Hansen, COMAFCENT 1994–1996; General Wolf-Dieter Langheld, COMJFC-B 2010–2012

The 1st Panzer Division (German: "1. Panzerdivision", short: "1. PzDiv") is an armoured division of the German Army. Its headquarter is based in Oldenburg. In the course of the last reorganisation of the Bundeswehr it became part of the Heavy Forces. The division is equipped and trained for high intensity combat operations against militarily organized enemies as well as peacekeeping missions. The majority of all German troops assigned to EU-Battlegroups and Nato Response Forces will come from this division.

The 43rd Mechanized Brigade of the Royal Netherlands Army is integrated into the 1st Panzer Division since 2016.

== History ==
This division was formed on 1 July 1956, the day of the official inauguration of the Bundeswehr. It was the first fully operational unit of the new German Army. At first referred to as 1st Grenadier Division, it was reorganized in the 1980s and made fully armoured in 1981. During this period it was part of I Corps of the Bundeswehr Heer, in turn part of NATO's Northern Army Group, Allied Forces Central Europe.

1st Panzer Division has deployed to the Balkans, Afghanistan and to several peacekeeping operations. Troops of this division were also deployed to the support of civilian agencies during large natural disasters such as the Hamburg Floods of 1962, disastrous wild fires in Northern Germany in the 1970s and the 2002 Floods in Eastern Germany.

The division cultivates a partnership with the United States Army 28th Infantry Division.

In April 2019 the division headquarters took the role of exercise High Command (HICON) for Exercise "Allied Spirit X" at Hohenfels Training Area in Bavaria. The exercise lead is routinely rotated among coalition/NATO partners. The exercise primarily involved the 21st Panzer Brigade, the Lithuanian Iron Wolf Brigade, and their subordinate units; 5,630 participants from 15 nations took part. The division already had Dutch, British and Polish officers within its ranks. The US Army's 2nd Battalion, 34th Armored Regiment, took part in the exercise. Six engineering advisor teams from 1st Security Force Assistance Brigade provided hands-on experience and testing of secure communications between NATO allies and partners.

== Organization ==
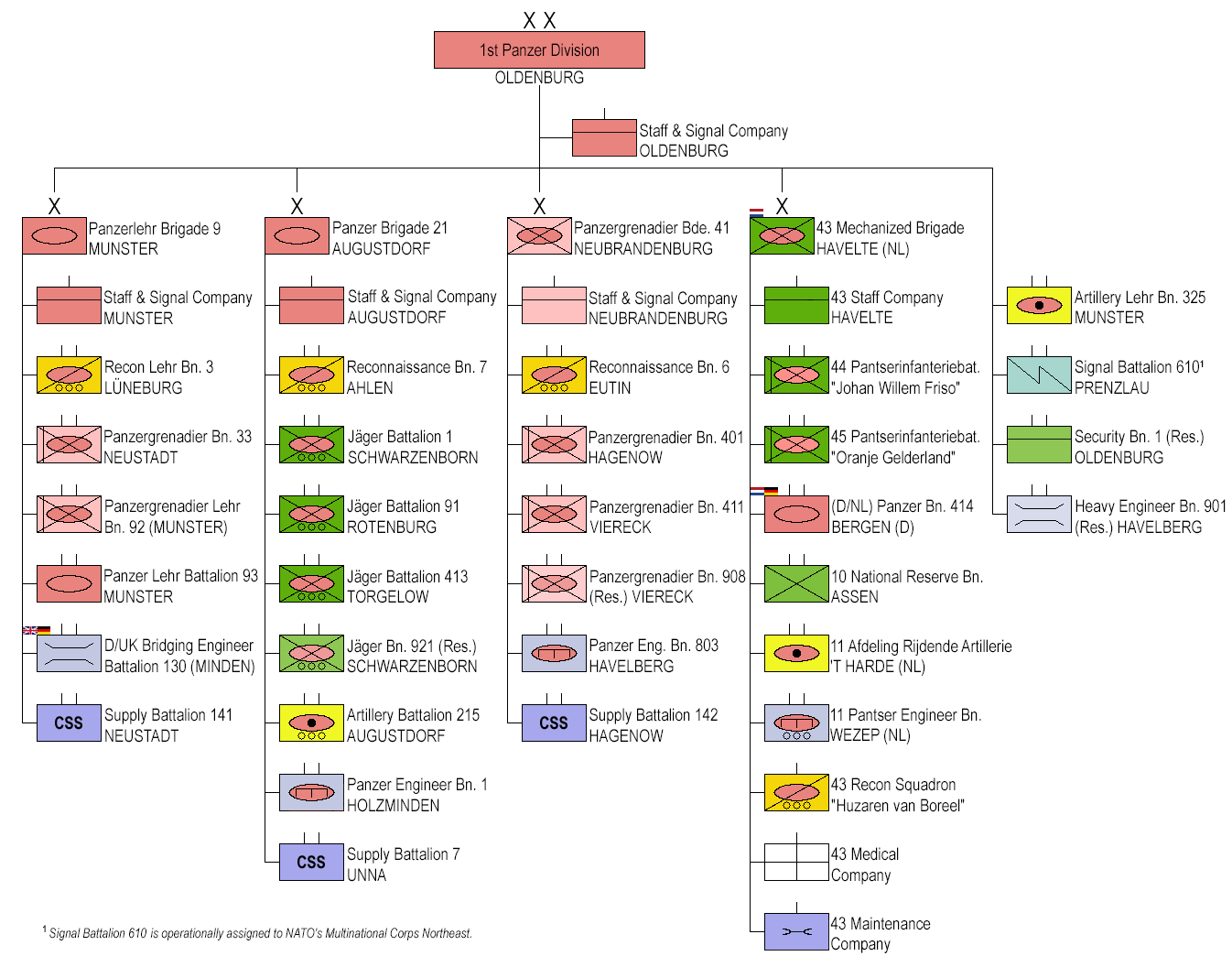
1st Panzer Division with integrated Dutch units 2025

- 1st Panzer Division (1. Panzerdivision), in Oldenburg
  - Staff and Signal Company 1st Panzer Division (Stabs- und Fernmeldekompanie 1. Panzerdivision), in Oldenburg
  - 9th Panzerlehr Brigade (Panzerlehrbrigade 9), in Munster
  - 21st Panzer Brigade (Panzerbrigade 21), in Augustdorf
  - 41st Panzergrenadier Brigade (Panzergrenadierbrigade 41), in Neubrandenburg
  - 43rd Mechanized Brigade (43 Gemechaniseerde Brigade), in Havelte
  - Artillery Lehr Battalion 325 (Artillerielehrbataillon 325), in Munster
  - Signal Battalion 610 (Fernmeldebataillon 610), in Prenzlau (Operationally assigned to NATO's Multinational Corps Northeast)
  - Heavy Engineer Battalion 901 (Schweres Pionierbataillon 901), in Havelberg (Reserve unit)
  - Security Support Battalion 1 (Sicherungsbataillon 1), in Oldenburg (Reserve unit)
  - Army Air Defense Activation Staff (Aufstellungsstab Heeresflugabwehr), in Lüneburg

== Geographic Distribution ==
1st Panzer Division locations 2025:
Units: Panzer Panzergrenadier Jäger Reconnaissance Artillery Engineers Logistics Signals Air Defense
Reserve formations are in Italics
#1 Munster: Panzergrenadier Lehr Battalion 92, Panzer Lehr Battalion 93, Artillery Lehr Battalion 325
#2 Augustdorf: Panzer Battalion 203, Artillery Battalion 215
