= Seedorf, Lower Saxony =

Seedorf
- Municipality
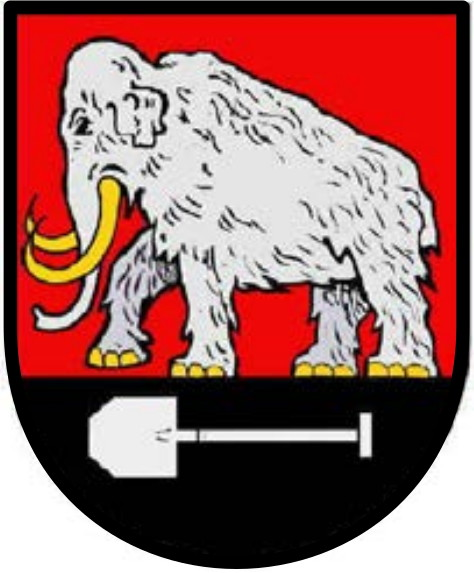
- Coat of arms

- Location of Seedorf within Rotenburg (Wümme) district
- Interactive map of Seedorf
- Location within Germany Location within Lower Saxony
- Coordinates: 53°21′N 9°14′E
- Country: Germany
- State: Lower Saxony
- District: Rotenburg (Wümme)
- Municipal assoc.: Selsingen
- Subdivisions: 2

Government
  - Mayor: Jacob Hinck

Area
  - Total: 18.75 km^{2} (7.24 sq mi)
- Elevation: 25 m (82 ft)

Population (2025-12-31)
  - Total: 692
  - Density: 36.9/km^{2} (95.6/sq mi)
- Time zone: UTC+01:00 (CET)
  - Summer (DST): UTC+02:00 (CEST)
- Postal codes: 27404
- Dialling codes: 04284
- Vehicle registration: ROW

Seedorf (German pronunciation: [ˈzeːdɔʁf]) is a municipality in the district of Rotenburg, in Lower Saxony, Germany.

== History ==
From 1963 to 2006, it hosted the 41st Mechanized Brigade of the I Corps (Netherlands). On August 1, 2006, the military unit was disbanded and the base was transferred to Germany, where it became the new base of Bundeswehr's 31st Airborne Brigade.
