= 12th Panzer Division =

12th Panzer Division may refer to:

- 12th Panzer Division (Wehrmacht)
- 12th Panzer Division (Bundeswehr)
- 12th SS Panzer Division Hitlerjugend

== See also ==
- 12th Division (disambiguation)
