= Fritz Reinhardt =

German official in the Nazi Party (1895–1969)

Friedrich Reinhardt
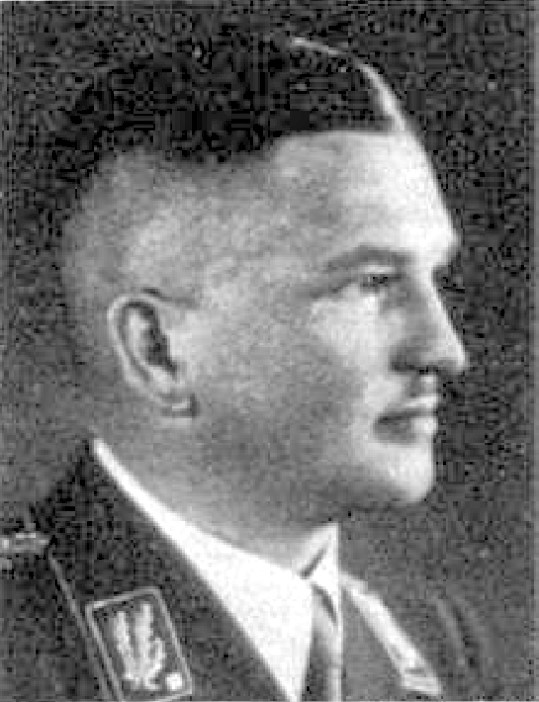

State Secretary of the Reich Ministry of Finance
- In office 1 April 1933 – 8 May 1945
- Minister: Lutz Graf Schwerin von Krosigk
- Preceded by: Arthur Zarden

Gauleiter of Upper Bavaria-Swabia later, Upper Bavaria
- In office 1 June 1928 – 1 November 1930
- Succeeded by: Adolf Wagner

Personal details
- Born: 3 April 1895 Ilmenau, German Empire
- Died: 17 June 1969 (aged 74) Regensburg, West Germany
- Party: Nazi Party
- Children: Klaus Reinhardt
- Occupation: Tax Administrator

Friedrich Rudolph (Fritz) Reinhardt (3 April 1895 – 17 June 1969) was an official in the Nazi Party (NSDAP) and in the government of Nazi Germany, most notably, State Secretary in the German Finance Ministry.

== Early life ==
The son of a bookbinder, Reinhardt was born in Ilmenau. He was educated in Ilmenau through high school, studied trade and commerce, and worked in business in Germany and abroad. At the outbreak of World War I, Reinhardt was in Riga, Livonia, and was interned by Russian forces. He ended up spending the war years in an internment camp in Siberia as an enemy alien, only returning to Germany in 1918. In 1919, he became the headmaster at the Thuringian Commercial School (Thüringische Handelsschule), and the head of the Academy for Economics and Taxation. From 1922, he worked as a tax administrator at the Thuringian State Finance Office. In 1924, he founded the first German Correspondence Trade School (Fernhandelschule) and became its director.

== Nazi Party career ==
Reinhardt was a member of the Deutsch-Volkischen Bund, a right-wing nationalist organization, and in 1923 he joined the Nazi Party before it was banned in the aftermath of the Beer Hall Putsch. Rejoining the newly refounded Party on 23 October 1925 (membership number 45,959) Reinhardt quickly established a career with his talent for speaking and his knowledge of economic and taxation systems. In 1926, he became the Ortsgruppenleiter (Local Group Leader) in Herrsching, in 1927 the Bezirksleiter (District Leader) in Upper Bavaria-South, and on 1 June 1928 he was named Gauleiter of Upper Bavaria-Swabia. On 1 October, the Gau was redesignated Upper Bavaria when Swabia became a separate Gau under Karl Wahl. In 1928 Reinhardt established the Correspondence Courses for Party Speakers at the Fernhandelschule. From 1929 to 1933, Reinhardt was the leader of the Rednerschule, the Nazi's official training school for Party speakers in Herrsching, and some 6000 party members eventually received propagandistic training there.

In September 1930, Reinhardt was elected as a deputy of the Reichstag for electoral constituency 24 (Upper Bavaria-Swabia), a seat he would retain until the fall of the Nazi regime. He took on the leading role in the NSDAP in financial issues, serving as the head of the Nazi Party faction on the budget committee and the Reich debt committee in the Reichstag. On 1 November 1930, he resigned as Gauleiter of Upper Bavaria due to his other increasing workloads and was succeeded by Adolf Wagner. From 27 April 1930 to 9 December 1932, Reinhardt was a department head in the Reichspropagandaleiter II office in the Party’s national leadership offices at the Brown House in Munich. From 1931 to June 1932 he also worked in the Reich Organization Department II on the staff of Deputy Führer Rudolf Hess. In these years, he served as the chief economic representative of the Party leadership as a member of its National Economic Council. In March 1933 he became the First Deputy Chairman of the Reichstag Budget Committee.

Reinhardt was also a member of the Sturmabteilung, the Nazi paramilitary organization. In November 1933, he became an SA-Gruppenführer. On 11 November 1937, he was promoted to SA-Obergruppenführer.

== State Secretary ==
On 1 April 1933, after the Nazi assumption of power, and due to Adolf Hitler's intervention, Reinhardt became State Secretary in the Reich Ministry of Finance under Johann Ludwig Graf Schwerin von Krosigk succeeding Arthur Zarden, whose incumbency violated Nazi policy, as he was Jewish. Reinhardt would hold this powerful position right through to the end of the regime in 1945. At its inaugural meeting on 3 October 1933, Reinhardt became a member of the Academy for German Law and on 17 November was made a member of its präsidium (standing committee) as well as chairman of its Committee for Finance and Tax Law. From 1936 to 1942, he was also a member of the General Council of the Four Year Plan.

Reinhardt could count on the Nazi Party's and Hitler's backing, which was why he held such an influential position from the outset. Reinhardt made the decisions as to taxation. Under him were the Tax and Customs School – set up by him in 1935 – and the Zollgrenzschutz ("Customs Service"). It was one of the components of the programs aimed at reducing unemployment, which collectively were also known as the Reinhardt Program. It is held by some, particularly German, historians that Reinhardt gave his name also to Operation Reinhard, although broader understanding especially after its termination has associated that program's name with Reinhard Heydrich, first head of the RSHA. The confusion stemmed from the fact that Heydrich had spelled his first name both Reinhard and Reinhardt throughout the 1930s during his career in the SS.

Section 1 (§1) of the Tax Reconciliation Act (Steueranpassungsgesetz) of October 1934 traces to Reinhardt. This law implemented the Nazi Weltanschauung. It obviated numerous, detailed changes to the individual regulations and implemented the Nazi ideology in one stroke. In the time that followed, a whole series of further regulations and decisions against Jews bore Reinhardt's signature, for instance, 1942's statement on stolen gold from dispossessed and murdered Jews.

He was publisher of the Deutsche Steuerzeitung ("German Tax Newspaper") from 1934 to 1945 which, along with all his other publications, he made required reading for all finance officials.

== Denazification ==
Reinhardt was captured by the Allies in May 1945, and on 17 June 1949 he was classified as a Hauptschuldiger (literally "main culprit") at a Denazification proceeding, and sentenced to four years in labour prison. In an appeal proceeding late in 1949, the sentence was upheld, but the penalty reduced to three years. By late 1950 the sentence was definitively confirmed, but Reinhardt's time in custody was to be counted towards his penalty, which led to his immediate release.

In the court proceedings, Reinhardt defended himself as a financial expert who was limited to Reich finances, who mitigated penalties inflicted on Jews, and otherwise had to bend to other ministries' decisions.

== Last years ==
Reinhardt worked as a tax adviser in West Germany, but otherwise was not to be seen in public life and died in Regensburg in 1969. His son Dr. Klaus Reinhardt became a general in the Bundeswehr.

== See also ==
- Reinhardt's fund

== Selected bibliography ==
- Höffkes, Karl (1986). Hitlers Politische Generale. Die Gauleiter des Dritten Reiches: ein biographisches Nachschlagewerk. Tübingen: Grabert-Verlag. ISBN 3-87847-163-7.
- Miller, Michael D.; Schulz, Andreas (2017). Gauleiter: The Regional Leaders of the Nazi Party and Their Deputies, 1925-1945. Vol. II (Georg Joel - Dr. Bernhard Rust). R. James Bender Publishing. ISBN 978-1-932970-32-6.
- Die Herrschaft der Börse, 1927
- Buchführung, Bilanz und Steuer: Lehr und Nachschlagwerk, 1936
- Was geschieht mit unserem Geld?, 1942
- Mehrwertsteuer-Dienst: Kommentar zum Umsatzsteuergesetz, 1967
