= Franz Pöschl =

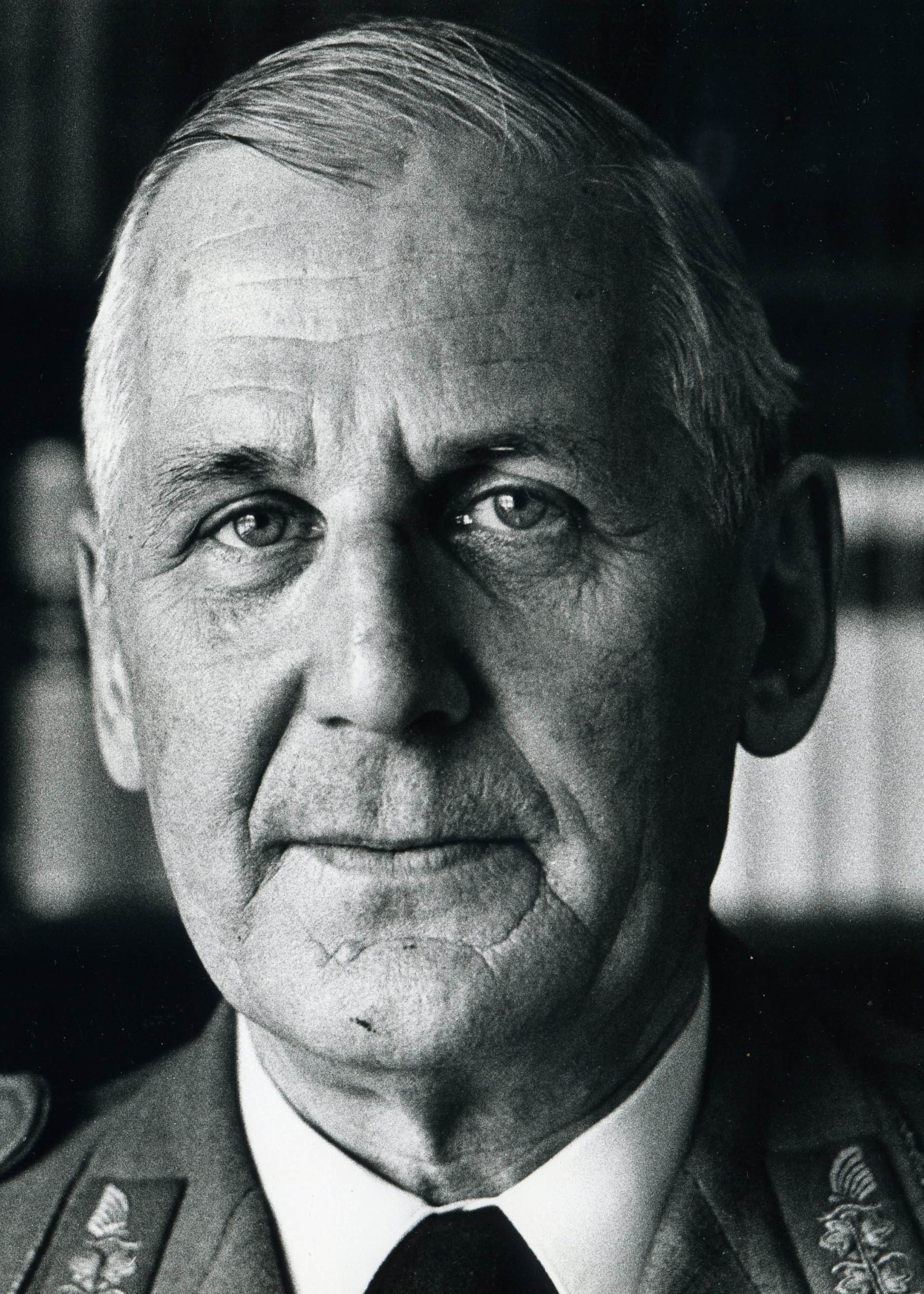
- Born: 2 November 1917; Munich, Kingdom of Bavaria, German Empire
- Died: 25 January 2011 (aged 93); Hamburg, Hamburg Metropolitan Region, Federal Republic of Germany
- Military career
- Allegiance: Nazi Germany; Federal Republic of Germany; NATO
- Branch: Heer (1936-1945); German Army (1960-1978)
- Rank: (Nazi Germany) Oberstleutnant (1945) (Germany) Generalleutnant (1972)
- Commands: Nazi Germany; Gebirgsjäger-Regiment 100; Gebirgsjäger-Regiment 143; Federal Republic of Germany; Gebirgsjägerbrigade 23; 1.Luftlandedivision; II. Korps; III. Korps
- Conflicts: Nazi Germany; World War II; Invasion of Poland; Battle of Lemburg; Invasion of Greece; Battle of Crete; German–Soviet War; Battle of Leningrad; Defense of Italy; Battle of Monte Cassino; Lapland War; Federal Republic of Germany; NATO; The Cold War
- Awards: See Awards and Decorations: Nazi Germany; Knights Cross of the Iron Cross; German Cross in Gold; Honor Roll Clasp of the German Army; Iron Cross 1st Class; Iron Cross 2nd Class; Wound Badge in Gold; Wound Badge in Silver; Wound Badge in Black; Infantry Assault Badge in Silver; Kreta Cuff Title; Lappland Shield; Winter Battle in the East 1941-42 Medal; Wehrmacht-Long Service Award 4th Class; The Medal Commemorating 13. March 1938; Kingdom of Bulgaria; Military Order for Bravery 4th Class; Federal Republic of Germany; Star of the Grand Cross of Merit (Knight Commander's Cross); Grand Cross of Merit (Commander's Cross); Parachutist Badge in Gold; Parachutist Badge in Silver; Parachutist Badge in Bronze; German Sports Badge in Gold; German Rescue Swimming Badge in Gold; United States of America; Legion of Merit (Degree of Officer); United States Army Parachutist Badge; French Republic; National Order of Merit (Commandeur); 1st Armored Division Medal; Military Parachutist Badge; Italian Republic; Military Parachutist Badge
- Other work: 1955-1959: Head of the Defense Department for the Bavarian State Chancellery; 1955-1967: Deutscher Bundestag Personnel Evaluation Committee; 1955-1957: Grünwalder Arbeitskreis; 1952-1955: Civic Education Officer for the Bavarian State Ministry of the Interior & State Police

Franz Pöschl (2 November 1917 in Munich – 25 January 2011 in Hamburg) served as an Oberstleutnant in the Wehrmacht during the Second World War and later as a Generalleutnant in the Bundeswehr during the Cold War. During the Second World War, he was awarded the Knights Cross of the Iron Cross on 23 February 1944 for extraordinary heroism during the Battle of Monte Cassino. His final Wehrmacht duty assignment was as the regimental commander of Gebirgsjäger-Regiment 143.

In 1960, Pöschl joined the newly established Bundeswehr, where he rose to the rank of Generalleutnant and served as the Commanding General of the III. Korps, which comprised a third of the entire German Army, and contributed significantly to West Germany's defense during the Cold War.

After his death in 2011, Generalleutnant Franz Pöschl was honored as a Kämpfer für Demokratie ("Fighter for Democracy") and as a Prägender Offizier der Bundeswehr ("Formative Officer of the Bundeswehr"). On 12 July 2024, The Tradition of the Bundeswehr recognized him as one of its most distinguished generals, celebrating him as "an example of military excellence and soldierly virtues." This distinction reflects his remarkable career, including his service as a highly decorated front-line officer during the Second World War, his influential role on the Bundestag Personnel Evaluation Committee, his successful leadership of the III. Korps, the universal respect he garnered from his soldiers for his compassionate leadership style, and his decisive actions to eliminate Schleifermethoden ("harsh training methods") while in command of the 1.Luftlandedivision.

== Wehrmacht Military Service (1936-1945) ==
=== Enlistment & Annexation of Austria (1936-1938) ===
Franz Pöschl enlisted in the Heer in 1936 as a prospective officer candidate in the 9.Kompanie/Gebirgsjäger-Regiment 100, 1.Gebirgs-Division, after completing his required service in the Reich Labor Service.

He took part in the “Anschluss” (Annexation) of Austria from 12 March 1938 to 20 March 1938. On 31 August 1938, Pöschl was promoted to Leutnant and was assigned as a Zugführer for the 3.Kompanie/Gebirgsjäger-Regiment 100.

=== Invasion of Poland (1939) ===
In the opening days of the Second World War, Leutnant Pöschl was severely wounded in action on 14 September 1939 during the Battle of Lemberg as part of the invasion of Poland. His courage in the face of intense urban combat during the Battle of Lemberg earned him the Iron Cross 2nd Class on 25 September 1939. On 1 April 1940, he was awarded the Wound Badge in Black for the injuries that he suffered within the first two weeks of the war.

The personal trauma of his serious injuries made him realize for the first time “what war is” as soon as it had begun. It was a formative experience that had a lasting influence on the rest of his life. He required eight months of medical treatment for his serious injuries and was promoted to Oberleutnant on 19 July 1940.

=== Invasion of Greece & The Battle of Crete (1941) ===
On 2 January 1941, Oberleutnant Pöschl became the commander of the 3.Kompanie/Gebirgsjäger-Regiment 100, 5.Gebirgs-Division. In April 1941, Gebirgsjäger-Regiment 100 participated in the Invasion of Greece and the follow-on the air assault on Crete. For his combat heroism during the Battle of Crete, Oberleutnant Pöschl was awarded the Iron Cross 1st Class on 24 June 1941.

=== The German-Soviet War (1942-1943) ===
After the successful invasion and occupation of Crete, Oberleutnant Pöschl's unit was deployed to the Eastern Front, where they fought with Army Group North in the Wolchow Swamps during the Battle of Leningrad in the Soviet Union.

Oberleutnant Pöschl was awarded the German Cross in Gold on 30 July 1942 for extraordinary combat bravery during an enemy tank incursion. Amid heavy fire, he destroyed an enemy tank using a satchel charge. His successful defense and counterattack broke the encirclement of I.Bataillon/Gebirgsjäger-Regiment 100.

Later that month, on 19 August 1942, the Soviet Union launched the Sinyavino Offensive, a large-scale operation aimed at breaking the Siege of Leningrad. During the ensuing battles, elements of the Soviet 8th Army clashed with the 5.Gebirgs-Division, where Oberleutnant Pöschl played a role in the defense. On 23 August 1942, amidst intense fighting, Oberleutnant Pöschl was severely wounded and required hospitalization for five months.

A few months after his injury, on 28 October 1942, Oberleutnant Pöschl was awarded the Military Order for Bravery 4th Class from the Kingdom of Bulgaria in recognition of his valiant defense.

After recovering from his wounds, Oberleutnant Pöschl was assigned as the regimental adjutant for Gebirgsjäger-Regiment 100. On April 20, 1943, he was promoted to Hauptmann and awarded the Wound Badge in Silver. On 1 October 1943, Hauptmann Pöschl became the battalion commander of I.Bataillon/Gebirgsjäger-Regiment 100.

=== The Battle of Monte Cassino (1944) ===
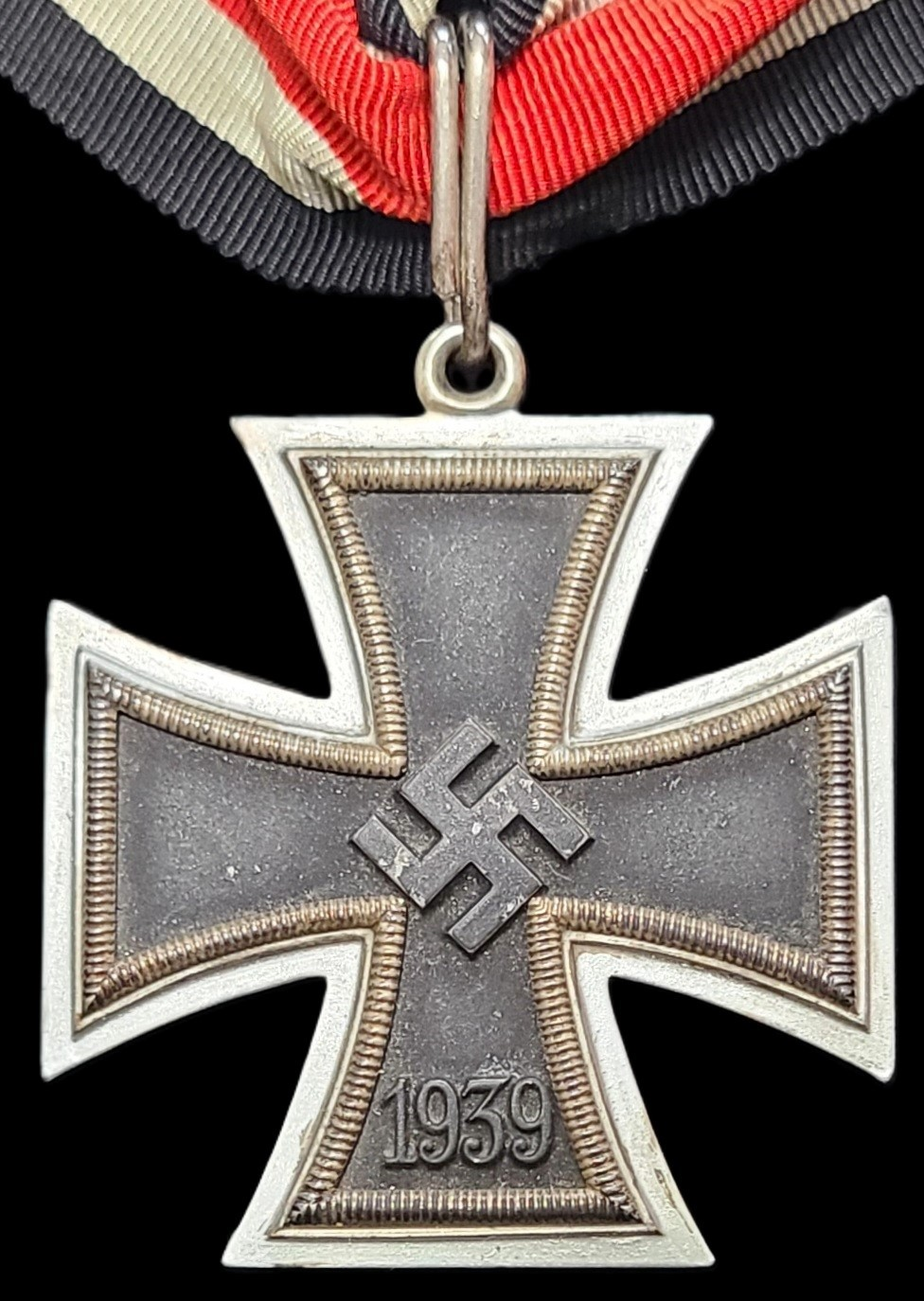
Hauptmann Franz Pöschl's Knights Cross of the Iron Cross.

In November 1943, the 5.Gebirgs-Division was withdrawn from the Soviet Union and redeployed to Italy to defend Monte Cassino against the Western Allied forces as part of the Wehrmacht's defense strategy in Italy.

On 13 January 1944, the French Expeditionary Corps launched an assault on Hauptmann Pöschl's entrenched positions along the Gustav Line in the Acquafondata area, close to Monte Cassino. The Algerian 3rd Infantry Division was tasked with seizing the summits of Monna Casale and Monna Acquafonda and advancing toward S.Elia. At a critical moment, Hauptmann Pöschl personally led multiple successful counterattacks, machine pistol in hand, preventing the 5.Gebirgs-Division from being outflanked and saving his battalion from destruction. Despite being seriously wounded by shrapnel during the intense combat—which included brutal hand-to-hand fighting—Hauptmann Pöschl continued to lead his men. His battalion adjutant and several members of his personal security detail were killed in action, while one of his company commanders was critically wounded. For his injuries, Hauptmann Pöschl was awarded the Wound Badge in Gold on 28 January 1944.

On 24 January 1944, at 10 p.m., the Algerian 3rd Infantry Division launched another attack against the 5.Gebirgs-Division, this time north of Monte Cassino. The 2nd Battalion of the 4th Tunisian Infantry Regiment (Tirailleurs) attempted to seize Monte Cifalco but was repelled by the determined resistance of I.Bataillon/Gebirgsjäger-Regiment 100 under Hauptmann Pöschl’s courageous and energetic leadership. This defense allowed German artillery observers stationed on Monte Cifalco to direct precise artillery fire against the remaining battalions of Tunisian forces, preventing them from capturing Colle Belvedere in the neighboring sector.

Monte Cifalco remained firmly in German hands until the conclusion of the Battle of Monte Cassino.

For his exceptional leadership and valor, Hauptmann Pöschl, Commander of I.Bataillon/Gebirgsjäger-Regiment 100, 5.Gebirgs-Division, was awarded the Knights Cross of the Iron Cross on 23 February 1944.

On 16 February 1944, Hauptmann Pöschl became the regimental commander of Gebirgsjäger-Regiment 100 and was promoted to major on 20 April 1944.

Major Pöschl was transferred to the Führer-Reserve OKH from 5 May 1944 to 30 July 1944 to recover from the wounds he had sustained during the Battle of Monte Cassino. Afterward, he attended General Staff Training with the 15.Panzergrenadier-Division from 31 July 1944 to 6 August 1944.

Upon successfully completing his training, Major Pöschl was assigned as an officer instructor at the Gebirgsjäger School in Mittenwald, where he served from 7 August 1944 until 10 September 1944.

=== The Lapland War (1944-1945) ===
On 11 September 1944, Major Pöschl took command of Gebirgsjäger-Regiment 143, 6.Gebirgs-Division, 20.Gebirgs-Armee in Finland at the start of the Lapland War between the Greater German Reich and the Republic of Finland. The 6.Gebirgs-Division began its evacuation from Finland to Norway in October 1944. On 13 October 1944, Major Pöschl bravely defended Liinakamari against a massive Soviet assault on the strategically critical Arctic port. He was awarded the Honor Roll Clasp of the German Army on 15 February 1945. Major Pöschl was promoted to his final wartime rank of Oberstleutnant on 15 January 1945.

Oberstleutnant Pöschl and Gebirgsjäger-Regiment 143 surrendered to British forces north of Narvik, Norway, in May 1945 at the time of the German Capitulation.

== Release from Captivity & Civil Service (1946-1959) ==
After the Second World War and his release from French captivity as a prisoner of war in February 1946, Pöschl worked as a laborer in a marble factory in Kiefersfelden from April 1946 to March 1947. Between May 1947 and May 1948, he completed an agricultural apprenticeship at the Benedictine Scheyern Abbey in Pfaffenhofen. He then pursued advanced studies to become a teacher at the Archdiocese of Munich and Freising. After passing his teaching examinations, he worked as a primary school teacher in Oberaudorf from May 1948 to December 1951.

In January 1952, he became a Civic Education Officer for the Bavarian State Police Bereitschaftspolizei and taught at the Police Academy in Munich, focusing on instilling democratic values to ensure the effective functioning of law enforcement within a democratic society. From April 1953 to February 1955, he was assigned as an instructor for civic education at the Bavarian State Ministry of the Interior.

In 1955, Pöschl became an active member of the Social Democratic Party of Germany (SPD) and participated in the Grünwalder Arbeitskreis, a working group focused on the non-partisan institutional safeguarding of democratic political education in Bavaria. As a result of this group's work, the Law on the Establishment of an Academy for Political Education was passed in 1957, leading to the creation of the Academy for Political Education in Tutzing, the first such institution in Germany established under public law.

On 13 July 1955, Pöschl was appointed by Federal President Theodor Heuss of the Federal Republic of Germany to the Personnel Evaluation Committee (Personalgutachterausschuss für die Streitkräfte) of the Deutscher Bundestag. This Personnel Evaluation Committee was responsible for evaluating former Wehrmacht officers, ranked Major and above, for reassignment to the Bundeswehr. The committee was dissolved on 4 September 1967 after the signing of the Repealing the Personnel Assessment Committee Act (Gesetz zur Aufhebung des Personalgutachterausschuß-Gesetzes).

From October 1955 to December 1959, Pöschl served as an Oberregierungsrat (Chief Administrative Officer) and Head of the Defense Department in the Bavarian State Chancellery. He also acted as the personal advisor for military affairs to Bavaria's Minister-President, Dr. Wilhelm Hoegner. Hoegner, a fellow Social Democrat, was a well-known opponent of the National Socialist German Workers' Party (NSDAP) who had returned from exile in Switzerland under the supervision of the American occupying forces. During this period, Pöschl played a significant role in establishing the newly founded Bundeswehr in Bavaria by overseeing the procurement of land for new barracks and training areas.

== Bundeswehr Military Service (1960-1978) ==
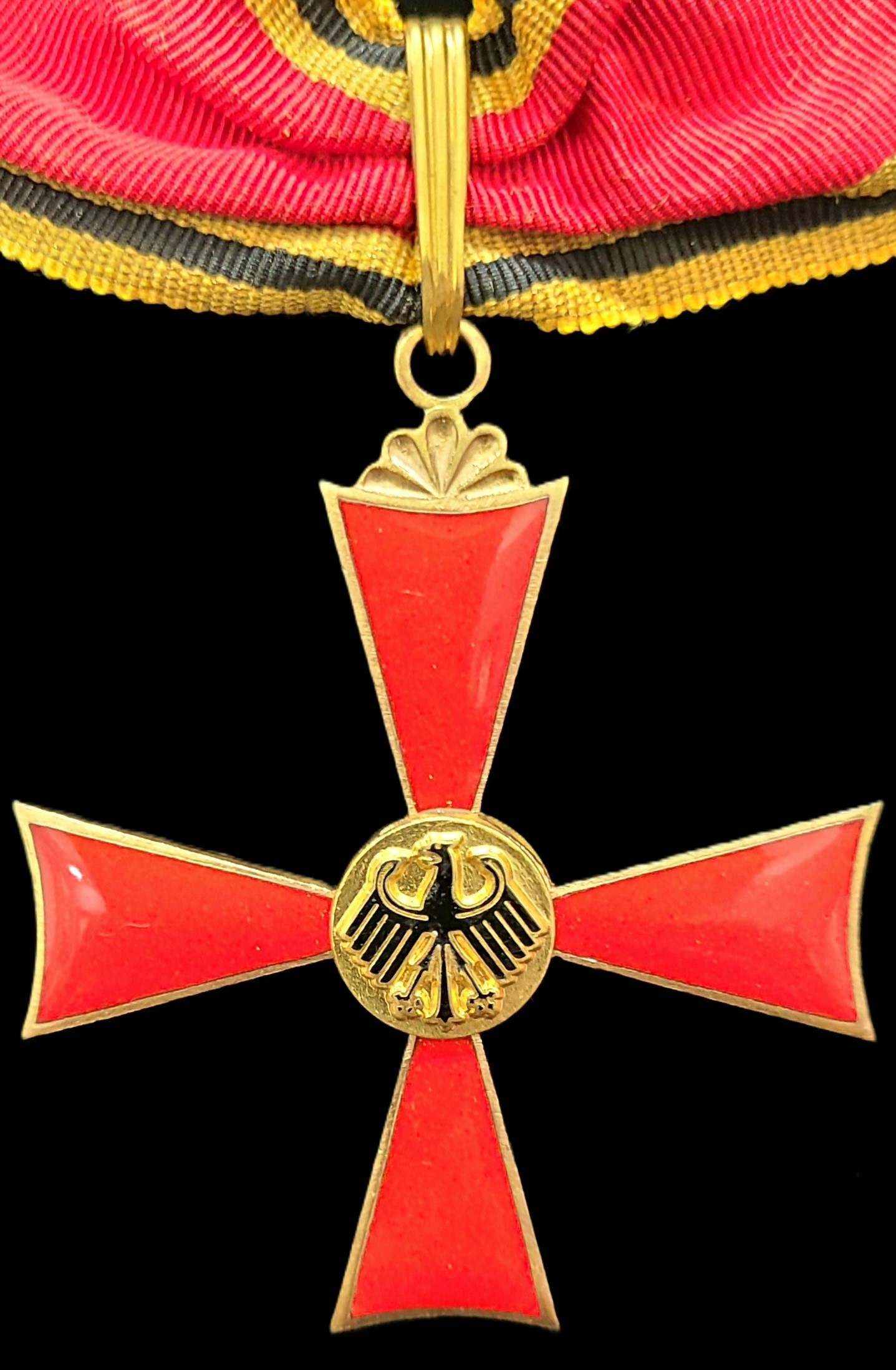
Generalleutnant Franz Pöschl's Grand Cross of Merit (Commander's Cross) awarded on 21.08.1973.

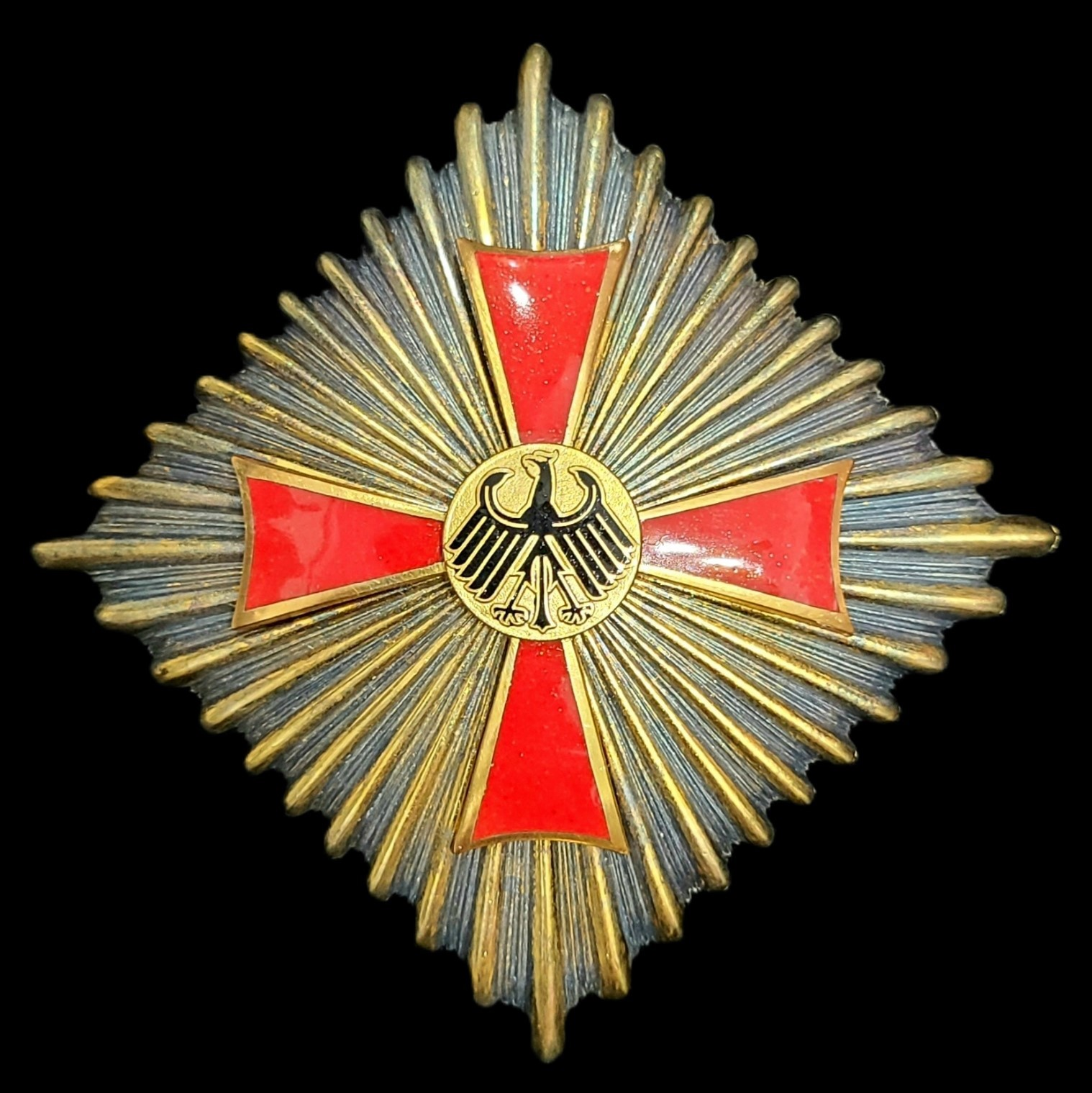
Generalleutnant Franz Pöschl's Star of the Grand Cross of Merit (Knight Commander's Cross) awarded on 08.02.1977.

In January 1960, Franz Pöschl accepted a commission as an Oberstleutnant in the Bundeswehr of the Federal Republic of Germany, and stepping away from active membership in the Social Democratic Party of Germany (SPD) due to potential conflicts of interest while in military service. Following his training at the Infanterieschule in Hammelburg, he was appointed Deputy Brigade Commander of Gebirgsjägerbrigade 23 in Bad Reichenhall on 1 April 1960. A year later, on 1 July 1961, Pöschl took command of the brigade and was subsequently promoted to Oberst on 27 March 1962.

On 26 March 1965, Pöschl advanced to Brigadegeneral, taking up the role of Deputy Division Commander of the 1.Luftlandedivision in Bruchsal on 1 April 1965. By 1 January 1967, he had ascended to Division Commander and earned promotion to Generalmajor on 16 June 1967. During his tenure with the 1. Luftlandedivision, Pöschl decisively eradicated the lingering Schleifermethoden ("harsh training methods"), a practice carried over from the Wehrmacht era.

Pöschl was a steadfast advocate of the Bundeswehr’s foundational leadership philosophy, Innere Führung ("internal leadership"). This framework emphasized principles such as Führen mit Auftrag ("leading with order") and Staatsbürger in Uniform ("citizens in uniform"). He championed a humanist approach to military leadership, integrating moral responsibility, individual dignity, and democratic values. Pöschl believed that soldiers should transcend blind obedience to orders by fully understanding the ethical dimensions of their actions while serving as informed and active citizens. His vision harmonized discipline with autonomy, fostering trust, initiative, and adherence to constitutional principles and the rule of law. For Pöschl, this approach was vital to preserving both the moral integrity and operational effectiveness of a modern military in a democratic society.

On 1 October 1970, Pöschl was named Deputy Commanding General of the II. Korps in Ulm.

In 1971, during NATO's "Winter Exercise-1971" (WINTEX-71), Pöschl gained international attention as the only general to openly criticize NATO's newly adopted nuclear deployment strategy. He famously described it as a "wahnwitzige und stupide Form militärischer Führung" ("insane and stupid form of military leadership"). The strategy proposed the deployment of U.S. nuclear weapons on German territory as a last resort against a potential Soviet invasion. Pöschl condemned this plan as illogical and reckless, arguing that defending Germany by reducing it to a nuclear wasteland was both futile and self-destructive.

On 1 October 1972, Pöschl was promoted to Generalleutnant and became the commanding general of the III. Korps in Koblenz. This unit represented a third of the entire German Army, placing Pöschl in a pivotal leadership position during the Cold War.

From 1974 onward, Franz Pöschl served as a trusted advisor to Chancellor Helmut Schmidt, offering critical guidance on defense policy and NATO strategy. His expertise and principled stance on military leadership made him an indispensable figure in shaping Germany’s role within the alliance during Schmidt’s tenure.

Throughout his career, Pöschl played an important role role in strengthening NATO's strategic military partnerships, particularly with the United States of America and the Republic of France, to deter Soviet aggression during the Cold War. On 3 March 1978, he was awarded the Legion of Merit (Degree of Officer) by General George S. Blanchard, Commanding General of United States Army Europe. The following year, on 11 April 1979, he received the National Order of Merit (Commandeur) from the Republic of France. These honors underscored Pöschl’s contributions to international military cooperation and his role as a pivotal architect of NATO’s Cold War strategy.

Beyond NATO, Pöschl demonstrated a strong commitment to fostering mutual understanding between former adversaries. In a historic gesture of reconciliation, he became the first Bundeswehr general to invite a Russian general to observe a military exercise, exemplifying his dedication to transparency and dialogue during the Cold War.

Pöschl’s service to the Federal Republic of Germany was equally celebrated. He was awarded the Grand Cross of Merit (Commander's Cross) by Federal President Walter Scheel on 21 August 1973, followed by the Star of the Grand Cross of Merit (Knight Commander's Cross) on 8 February 1977.

After 27 years of distinguished military service, Franz Pöschl retired on 31 March 1978, holding the rank of Generalleutnant.

== Awards and decorations ==
=== The Greater German Reich ===
- 23.02.1944 Knights Cross of the Iron Cross
- 30.07.1942 German Cross in Gold
- 15.02.1945 Honor Roll Clasp of the German Army
- 24.06.1941 Iron Cross 1st Class
- 10.10.1939 Iron Cross 2nd Class
- 28.01.1944 Wound Badge in Gold
- 20.04.1943 Wound Badge in Silver
- 01.04.1940 Wound Badge in Black
- 16.09.1941 Infantry Assault Badge in Silver
- 31.01.1942 Kreta Cuff Title
- 20.07.1945 Lappland Shield
- 05.10.1942 Winter Battle in the East 1941-42 Medal
- 06.12.1940 Wehrmacht-Long Service Award 4th Class
- 13.03.1938 The Medal Commemorating 13. March 1938

=== The Kingdom of Bulgaria ===
- 28.10.1942 Military Order for Bravery 4th Class

=== The Federal Republic of Germany ===
- 08.02.1977 Star of the Grand Cross of Merit (Knight Commander's Cross)
- 21.08.1973 Grand Cross of Merit (Commander's Cross)
- 12.07.1971 Parachutist Badge in Gold
- 28.02.1968 Parachutist Badge in Silver
- 16.07.1965 Parachutist Badge in Bronze
- 08.12.1966 German Sports Badge in Gold
- 00.00.0000 German Rescue Swimming Badge in Gold

=== The United States of America ===
- 03.03.1978 Legion of Merit (Degree of Officer)
- 26.02.1969 United States Army Parachutist Badge

=== The French Republic ===
- 11.04.1979 National Order of Merit (Commandeur)
- 14.03.1978 1st Armored Division Medal
- 01.03.1968 Military Parachutist Badge

=== The Italian Republic ===
- 09.02.1968 Military Parachutist Badge

== Dates of Rank ==
Insignia	Rank	Date of Rank	Armed Forces
	Leutnant	01.09.1938	Wehrmacht
	Oberleutnant	01.08.1940	Wehrmacht
	Hauptmann	01.02.1943	Wehrmacht
	Major	01.04.1944	Wehrmacht
	Oberstleutnant	01.11.1944	Wehrmacht
Jacke Dienstanzug Heeresuniformträger Heeresflugabwehrtruppe	Oberstleutnant	04.01.1960	Bundeswehr
Jacke Dienstanzug Heeresuniformträger i.G.	Oberst	27.03.1962	Bundeswehr
	Brigadegeneral	26.03.1965	Bundeswehr
	Generalmajor	16.06.1967	Bundeswehr
	Generalleutnant	01.10.1972	Bundeswehr

== Publications ==
- Franz Pöschl: Man Breeding – A Goal of Inner Leadership; series of publications: Information for the Troops: Supplement; 1966, 4.

== Mentions in Literature ==
- Clemens Range : The Generals and Admirals of the Bundeswehr. Herford 1990
- Andreas Düfel, Clemens Range: The Knight Cross bearers in the Bundeswehr. 2. edition. 2002 Suderburg 2002
- Franz Pöschl in: International Biographical Archive 22/1978 from 22. May 1978, in the Munzinger Archive

Military offices
Preceded by Generalmajor Hubert Sonneck	Commander of the 1. Luftlande-Division (Bundeswehr); October 1966 – 30 September 1972	Succeeded by Generalmajor Heinrich Schwiethal
Preceded by Generalleutnant Gerd Niepold	Commander of III. Corps (Bundeswehr); 1 October 1972 – 31 March 1978	Succeeded by Generalleutnant Paul-Georg Kleffel
