= 12th Panzer Division (Bundeswehr) =

Coordinates: 49.825719°N 9.901128°E

12th Panzer Division: 12. Panzerdivision
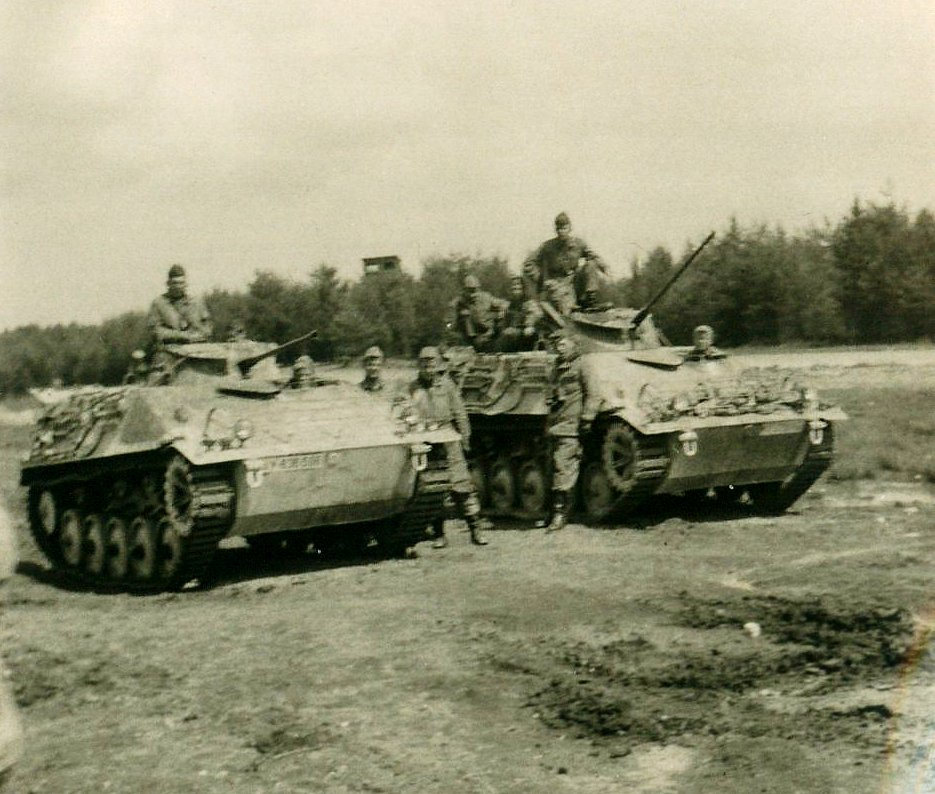
- Schützenpanzer SPz 11-2 Kurz of Armoured recce troops of the 35th Panzergrenadier Brigade in 1967
- Active: 1 January 1961 - 31 March 1994
- Country: Federal Republic of Germany
- Role: Armoured warfare
- Size: Division
- Part of: German III Corps
- Nicknames: Fränkische Division; Zwölfte

Insignia
- 12th Panzer Division insignia

The 12th Panzer Division (German: 12. Panzerdivision) was a West German armoured formation. It was part of the III Corps of the Bundeswehr, which also incorporated in 1985 the 5th Panzer Division and 2nd Panzergrenadier Division. III Corps was part of NATO's Central Army Group (CENTAG), along with the Bundeswehr's II Corps and the American V and VII Corps. In the wake of military restructuring brought about by the end of the Cold War, the 12th Panzer Division was disbanded in 1994.

The division was constituted as the 12th Panzergrenadier Division in Tauberbischofsheim on January 1, 1961, as part of the II Corps of the Bundeswehr. At that time, it commanded the 35th Panzergrenadier Brigade, and in 1963 the 36th Panzer Brigade was also subordinated to the division. Subsequently, the 12th was re-designated a panzer (armoured) division. In 1970, the division was relieved from assignment to the II Corps and assigned to the III Corps. A third active brigade was not authorized for the division until 1975 during the "Heeresstruktur III" reforms. By 1977, the division's main components were the 14th Panzer, the 35th Panzergrenadier, and the 36th Panzer Brigades. In 1981, the 14th Panzer Brigade became the 34th Panzer Brigade.

Following the end of the Cold War, the 12th Panzer Division was disbanded in 1994.

== Commanders ==
Nr.	Name	Start of command	End of command
14	Generalmajor Manfred Eisele	1992	1994
13	Generalmajor Hartmut Bagger	1990	1992
12	Generalmajor Hartmut Foertsch	1989	1990
11	Generalmajor Gert Verstl	1986	1989
10	Generalmajor Siegfried Storbeck	1984	1986
9	Generalmajor Lutz Moek	1982	1984
8	Generalmajor Gerd-Helmut Komossa	1980	1982
7	Generalmajor Gert Bastian	1976	1980
6	Generalmajor Paul-Georg Kleffel	1973	1976
5	Generalmajor Hans Teusen	1971	1973
4	Generalmajor Gerd Kobe	1967	1971
3	Generalmajor Peter von Butler	1964	1967
2	Brigadegeneral Kurt von Einem	1962	1964
1	Brigadegeneral Artur Weber	1961	1962
