= Werner Ebeling =

Nazi officer (1913–2008)

- Born: 21 November 1913
- Died: 25 August 2008 (aged 94)
- Military career
- Allegiance: Nazi Germany; West Germany
- Branch: Army
- Service years: 1935–45; 1956–70
- Rank: Oberst (Wehrmacht); Generalmajor (Bundeswehr)
- Commands: 11th Panzergrenadier Division
- Conflicts: World War II
- Awards: Knight's Cross of the Iron Cross with Oak Leaves

Werner Hermann Karl Ebeling (21 November 1913 – 25 August 2008) was an officer in the Wehrmacht of Nazi Germany during World War II and a general in the Bundeswehr of West Germany. He was a recipient of the Knight's Cross of the Iron Cross with Oak Leaves. He commanded the 11 Panzergrenadier Division of the Bundeswehr from 15 January 1968 to 30 September 1970.

== Awards and decorations ==
- Iron Cross (1939) 2nd Class (14 June 1940) & 1st Class (5 September 1941)
- Wound Badge in Black (18 March 1944)
- Infantry Assault Badge (13 November 1941)
- Eastern Front Medal (31 July 1942)
- Close Combat Clasp in Bronze (25 February 1944)
- Honour Roll Clasp of the Army (27 December 1943)
- German Cross in Gold on 11 March 1943 as Oberleutnant in Grenadier-Regiment 220
- Knight's Cross of the Iron Cross with Oak Leaves
  - Knight's Cross on 9 April 1944 as Major and commander of the II./Grenadier-Regiment 220
  - Oak Leaves on 5 March 1945 as Oberst and commander of Grenadier-Regiment 154
- Great Cross of Merit of the Federal Republic of Germany (22 July 1970)

Military offices
Preceded by Oberst Hasso Neitzel	Commander of Panzergrenadierbrigade 16 (Bundeswehr); 16 July 1963 – 31 October 1965	Succeeded by Oberst Oskar-Hubert Dennhardt
Preceded by Generalmajor Otto Uechtritz	Commander of 11th Panzergrenadier Division (Bundeswehr); 15 January 1968 – 30 September 1970	Succeeded by Generalmajor Hans-Heinrich Klein
