= Hans-Joachim Mack =

German general

Hans- Joachim Mack
- Born: 30 March 1928; Bischofsburg, East Prussia, Weimar Germany (today Biskupiec, Poland)
- Died: 6 April 2008 (aged 80); Barsinghausen, Germany
- Military career
- Allegiance: Federal Republic of Germany
- Service years: 1956–1987
- Rank: General
- Commands: Panzerbrigade 14; Kampftruppenschule 2 Fachschule des Heeres für Erziehung; 6. Panzergrenadierdivision; III Korps

Hans-Joachim Mack (30 March 1928 – 6 April 2008) was a German general of the Bundeswehr and Deputy Supreme Allied Commander Europe (DSACEUR) from 1984 to 1987.

== Biography ==
Mack was born in Bischofsburg, East Prussia, Weimar Germany (today Biskupiec, Poland). At the end of World War II he served as a Flakhelfer.

Mack joined the Bundesgrenzschutz in 1952 and the Bundeswehr tank troops as an officer cadet in 1956. He attended his General Staff Training Course at the Führungsakademie der Bundeswehr in 1962 – 1964 and served in several position in the Panzertroops.

He was promoted to Colonel and became the commander of the Panzerbrigade 14 in 1972. As a Brigadier-General he commanded the Armoured Corps Training Centre (Kampftruppenschule 2) and the Fachschule des Heeres für Erziehung from 1975 to 1978. Until 1979 he was the commander of the 6. Panzergrenadierdivision and served at NATO's Supreme Headquarters Allied Powers Europe until 1983. From 1983 to 1984 he commanded the Bundeswehr's III Korps. On 2 April 1984 Mack was promoted to Deputy Commander Supreme Allied Command Europe, a position he held until his retirement in 1987.

Military offices
Preceded by General Günter Kießling	Deputy Supreme Allied Commander Europe; 1984–1987	Succeeded by Eberhard Eimler
Preceded by Generalleutnant Wolfgang Altenburg	Commanding General, III Corps (Bundeswehr); 1 April 1983 – 31 March 1984	Succeeded by Generalleutnant Karl Erich Diedrichs
Preceded by Generalmajor Johannes Poeppel	Commander of 6th Panzergrenadier Division (Bundeswehr); 1 April 1978 – 24 September 1979	Succeeded by Generalmajor Konrad Manthey
