= Klaus Reinhardt =

Former German Army general (1941–2021)

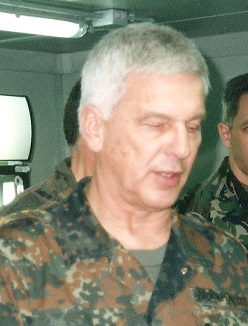
- Reinhardt as COMKFOR in 1999
- Born: 15 January 1941; Berlin, Brandenburg, Prussia, Germany
- Died: 30 November 2021 (aged 80)
- Military career
- Allegiance: Germany
- Branch: German Army
- Service years: 1960–2001
- Rank: General
- Commands: Mountain Brigade 23; Military Academy of the German Armed Forces; 3rd Army Corps; German Army Command; LANDCENT; KFOR
- Wars and conflicts: United Nations Operation in Somalia I; NATO intervention in Bosnia and Herzegovina (IFOR, SFOR); NATO bombing of Yugoslavia (KFOR)
- Other work: Journalist, writer, lecturer

Klaus Reinhardt (15 January 1941 – 30 November 2021) was a German Army general. He was the commander of the German Army Forces Command, the NATO Joint Headquarters Center (formerly Headquarters Allied Land Forces Central Europe), and KFOR in Kosovo. Reinhardt died on 30 November 2021, at the age of 80.

== Military career ==
Reinhardt was born 1941 in Berlin. He was the son of Nazi bureaucrat Fritz Reinhardt. In 1960, he entered the West German Army as an officer candidate with the mountain infantry forces. From 1963 on, he served as a platoon leader with the Gebirgsjägerbataillon 222 in Mittenwald and later continued as an operations officer from October 1966 to October 1967.

From 1967 to 1972, he studied history and political sciences at the University of Freiburg, earning a doctoral degree with his dissertation about the strategic failure of Hitler in the Battle of Moscow. In 1968, he was already promoted to captain and served as company commander with Gebirgsjägerbataillon 221 in Mittenwald. From 1973 to 1975, he passed the General Staff course at the Führungsakademie der Bundeswehr in Hamburg. In 1975 he additionally passed the US Command and General Staff Officer course at Fort Leavenworth.

In October 1976, Reinhardt was promoted to lieutenant colonel and served as operations staff officer (G-3) of NATO's Central Army Group (CENTAG) in Heidelberg. From January 1978 to October 1980 he used to be assistant to the Vice Inspector General of the West German Military, General Jürgen Brandt at the ministry of defence in Bonn. From 1982 he took command of the Gebirgsjägerbataillon 231 in Bad Reichenhall. From 1982 to 1983 he served as operations officer (G-3) in the staff of the 1st Mountain Division in Garmisch-Partenkirchen. After his promotion to full colonel he served as military assistant to the then minister of defence Manfred Wörner and in 1986 till September 1988 as commander of the Gebirgsjägerbrigade 23 in Bad Reichenhall.

On 1 October 1988, he was promoted to brigadier general and the same day took over as Chief of Staff Section IV (Planning; NATO Forces, conception of the Federal Armed Forces, coordination of the budgetary means for the military and planning of armament) within the Armed Forces Staff of the German Ministry of Defence in Bonn.

In October 1990 he was appointed major general and commander of the Führungsakademie der Bundeswehr in Hamburg. During this time, he also used to be vice president of the Clausewitz Society and a member of the scientific advisory council of the German Military History Research Office (MGFA). As commander of the command and general staff college, he changed the academy into a strategic and operational think tank and opened it to officers from Eastern European countries, which is one reason why he was awarded an honorary doctorate from the University of Budapest.

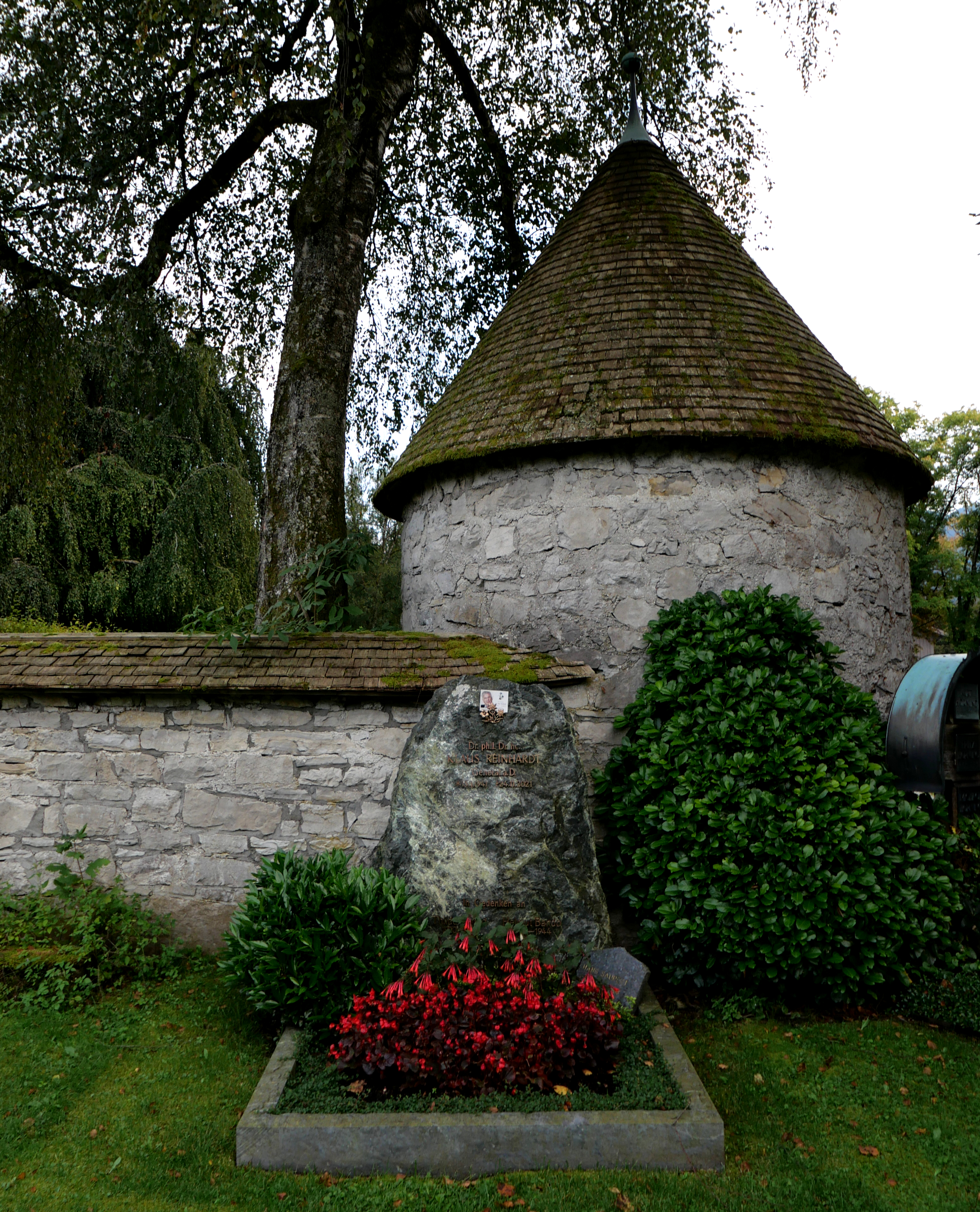
The grave in 2024.

In June 1993, he was promoted to lieutenant general and appointed commander of the 3rd Army Corps in Koblenz, which he also had to disband due to military reforms. In 1994, he built up the German Army Forces Command in Koblenz as commanding general and made it a key element for the German military missions abroad. He formally led the German military missions in Somalia (UNOSOM), Croatia, and Bosnia and Herzegovina (IFOR, SFOR).

In April 1998, he was promoted to general and appointed Commander NATO Joint Headquarters Centre (today Allied Force Command Heidelberg). He actively participated in the NATO structure reform process. From October 1999 to April 2000, he served as commander of KFOR in Pristina, Kosovo, and was in charge of 50,000 soldiers from 39 nations. Klaus Reinhardt retired in March 2001. Afterwards, he began to work as a freelance journalist and writer, as well as a lecturer in modern history and political science.

Reinhardt is buried at the cemetery of Garmisch in Garmisch-Partenkirchen.

== Views ==
In 1993, as the commander of the III, Corps, Reinhardt was heavily criticised by high-ranking conservative politician Alfred Dregger for banning Bundeswehr soldiers from participating in a memorial service at a German war cemetery that also held the graves of fallen Waffen-SS soldiers on Volkstrauertag. Reinhardt argued that he meant no disrespect to the young soldiers that had died for Germany but found that the ideology of the Waffen-SS was incompatible with the values of democracy.

Military offices
Preceded by Generalleutnant Peter Heinrich Carstens	Commanding General, III Corps (Bundeswehr); 1 July 1993 – 31 March 1994	Formation disbanded
Preceded by Lieutenant General Mike Jackson	Commander Kosovo Force; 8 October 1999 – 18 April 2000	Succeeded by Teniente General Juan Ortuño Such
