= Heinrich Gaedcke =

WW2 German Army general (1905-1992)

Ludwig Heinrich Gaedcke
- Born: 16 January 1905; Guben, Province of Brandenburg, Kingdom of Prussia, German Empire
- Died: 22 December 1992 (aged 87); Waldesch near Koblenz, Rhineland-Palatinate
- Military career
- Allegiance: Weimar Republic (to 1933); Nazi Germany; West Germany
- Branch: Reichswehr; Heer; Bundeswehr
- Service years: 1925–1965
- Rank: Lieutenant general
- Nickname: Heinz
- Commands: 11 Panzergrenadier Division; III Corps
- Conflicts: World War II; Cold War
- Awards: Knight's Cross of the Iron Cross; Knight Commander's Cross of the Order of Merit of the Federal Republic of Germany; Legion of Merit

Ludwig Heinrich Gaedcke (16 January 1905 – 22 December 1992) was a German general.

== Life ==
=== Early life ===
He was the son of lawyer and notary Carl Gaedcke (1868–1913) and grew up in Guben. Following graduation from the Gymnasium in 1924, he joined the 8th Prussian Infantry Regiment as a professional soldier in 1925. He served in a variety of posts until 1935, when he was promoted to captain and admitted to the War Academy for general staff training. Subsequently, he worked as a clerk in the General Staff of the Army.

=== Second World War ===
During the Second World War he served as a general staff officer of the 25th Infantry Division from June 1940 to January 1943, and was promoted to major in 1940, lieutenant-colonel in 1943 and colonel in 1943. In February 1943 he was assigned to the reserve of the Army Command and spent much of 1943 teaching at the military academy. He was acting general staff officer of the XXIV Panzer Corps in October–November 1943 and of the XI Army Corps from December 1943 to February 1944. From February to July 1944 he was again assigned to the reserve. In July 1944 he became the deputy of the chief of the general staff of the 4th Army and in August 1944 he became the chief of the general staff of the 6th Army. He was promoted to major general in 1944.

=== Cold War ===
From 1948 to 1956 he worked in managerial roles for the companies Bürkle and Bahlsen. Following West German rearmament he joined the Bundeswehr as one of its first general officers in 1956. He commanded the Military Academy of the German Armed Forces from 1957 to 1959 and the Bundeswehr's 11th Panzergrenadier Division from 1959 to 1960. From 1961 to 1965 he was Commanding General of the 3rd Corps in Koblenz. He was promoted to lieutenant general in 1961. Upon his retirement in 1965 he was awarded both the Knight Commander's Cross of the Order of Merit of the Federal Republic of Germany and the French Legion of Merit.

== Family ==
In 1940, he married Gerda Silvia Gater, née Deffner (b. 4 April 1906 in Düsseldorf; d. 27 January 2006 in Waldesch near Koblenz). He had three children with Gerda and adopted daughter Jutta from Gerda's first marriage with Dr. Rudolf Anton Gater (1905–1989).

Gaedcke was the maternal grandfather of the Secretary-General of the European Commission Martin Selmayr. Martin Selmayr has said that his commitment to the European project in part stems from a trip he took as a teenager with Gaedcke to the battlefields and military cemeteries of Verdun, where Gaedcke told him that his generation had an obligation to prevent any repeat of the mistakes of the past.

== Awards and decorations ==
- Wehrmacht Long Service Award, 4th to 3rd Class
- Sudetenland Medal with the Prague Castle Bar
- Medal to Commemorate the Homecoming of the Memelland
- Iron Cross (1939), 2nd and 1st Class
- German Cross in Gold on 7 March 1942 as Major im Generalstab in the 25. Infanterie-Division (motorized)
- Winter Battle in the East 1941–42 Medal
- Order of the Crown of Romania, Commander's Cross
- Order of Merit of the Kingdom of Hungary, Commander's Cross with Swords on War Ribbon
- Knight's Cross of the Iron Cross on 7 April 1944 as Oberst im Generalstab and Chief of the Generalstab of XI. Armeekorps
- Knight Commander's Cross of the Order of Merit of the Federal Republic of Germany (1965)
- Legion of Merit (1965)

Military offices
Preceded by Oberst i.G. Hellmuth Schultze	Chief of the Generalstab XI. Armeekorps; 7 December 1943 – 25 February 1944	Succeeded by Oberst i.G. Hellmuth Schultze
Preceded by Generalmajor Helmuth Voelter	Chief of the Generalstab 6. Armee; 15 August 1944 – 8 May 1945	Succeeded by None
Preceded by None	Commander of 11. Panzergrenadier-Division (Bundeswehr); 1 November 1959 – 31 December 1960	Succeeded by Generalmajor Cord von Hobe
Preceded by Generalleutnant Smilo Freiherr von Lüttwitz	Commander of III. Corps (Bundeswehr); 1 January 1961 – 31 March 1965	Succeeded by Generalleutnant Albert Schnez
