= Günter Kießling =

German general (1925–2009)

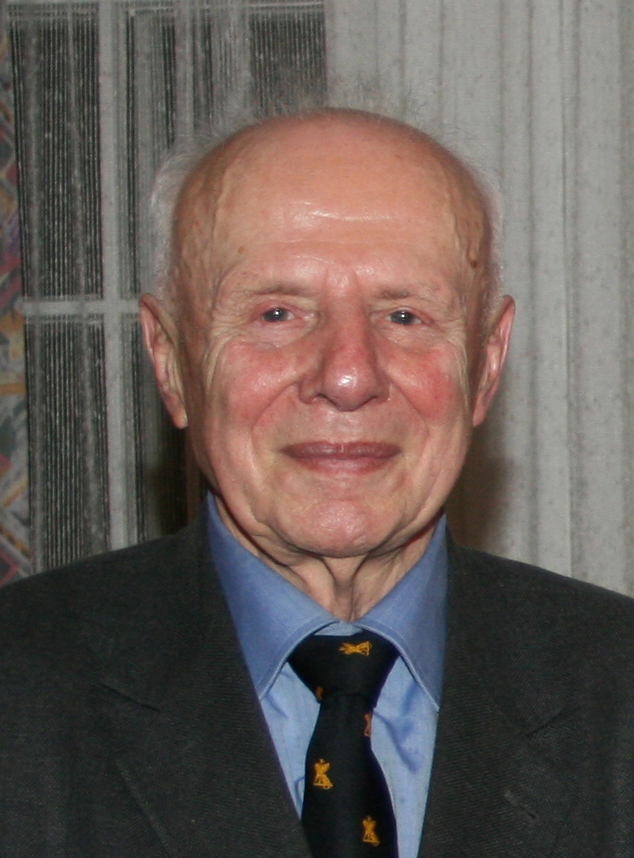
- Kießling in 2007
- Born: October 20, 1925; Frankfurt (Oder), Germany
- Died: August 28, 2009 (aged 83) Rendsburg, Schleswig-Holstein, Germany
- Buried: Berlin, Germany
- Allegiance: Nazi Germany (to 1945); West Germany
- Branch: Army (Wehrmacht); Army (Bundeswehr)
- Service years: 1939–1945; 1956–1983; 1984
- Rank: Lieutenant (Wehrmacht); General (Bundeswehr)
- Conflicts: World War II

Günter Kießling (20 October 1925 – 28 August 2009) was a German general in the Bundeswehr, who became famous as the subject of what became known as the Kießling (or Kiessling) Affair.

Kießling was born in Frankfurt (Oder) in the Province of Brandenburg. In the Second World War, he was a lieutenant in the infantry and served on the Eastern Front. Some time after the war, he joined the Bundesgrenzschutz and later transferred to the Bundeswehr. Before his early retirement he was Commander of NATO land forces and deputy to the Supreme Allied Commander in Europe.

In 1983 Kießling was secretly accused of homosexuality, which, in his position and at the time, was regarded as a security risk and led to his premature retirement. The allegations were later found to be without foundation and he was rehabilitated, being briefly reinstated before retiring with full honours.

Kießling again achieved public prominence in 1997 when he spoke at the funeral of Josef Rettemeier, a highly decorated World War II soldier, holding the Knight's Cross with Oak Leaves, who later served in the Bundeswehr.

Günter Kießling died in Rendsburg, in Schleswig-Holstein, on 28 August 2009.

Military offices
Preceded by Günter Luther	Deputy Supreme Allied Commander Europe; With Sir Peter Terry; 1982 – 1984	Succeeded by Hans-Joachim Mack
Preceded by Generalmajor Jürgen Brandt	Commander of 10th Panzer Division (Bundeswehr); 13 January 1976 – 29 September 1977	Succeeded by Generalmajor Eberhard Hackensellner
