= Hans Teusen =

German army general (1917-2011)

- Born: 26 July 1917
- Died: 11 February 2011 (aged 93)
- Military career
- Allegiance: Nazi Germany; West Germany
- Branch: Luftwaffe
- Rank: Generalmajor (Bundeswehr)
- Commands: 12th Panzer Division
- Conflicts: World War II
- Awards: Knight's Cross of the Iron Cross

Hans Teusen (26 July 1917 – 11 February 2011) was a German paratroop officer during World War II. He was a recipient of the Knight's Cross of the Iron Cross of Nazi Germany. After the war he joined the Bundeswehr of West Germany and achieved a general's rank.

== Awards and decorations ==
- Iron Cross (1939) 2nd Class (15 May 1940) & 1st Class (28 May 1940)
- Knight's Cross of the Iron Cross on 14 June 1941 as Leutnant and Zugführer (platoon leader) in the 6./Fallschirmjäger-Regiment 2
- German Cross in Gold on 10 September 1944 as Hauptmann in the I./Fallschirmjäger-Regiment 16
- Officer Cross of the Order of Merit of the Federal Republic of Germany 1970
- Commander Cross of the Order of Merit of the Federal Republic of Germany 1977

Military offices
Preceded by Oberst Hans-Gotthard Pestke	Commander of Luftlandebrigade 25; April 1965 – September 1969	Succeeded by Oberst Hans Duijkers
Preceded by Generalmajor Gerd Kobe	Commander of 12. Panzer-Division (Bundeswehr); 1 October 1971 – 30 September 1973	Succeeded by Generalmajor Paul-Georg Kleffel
