= Schnez-Truppe =

Illicit West German private paramilitary unit

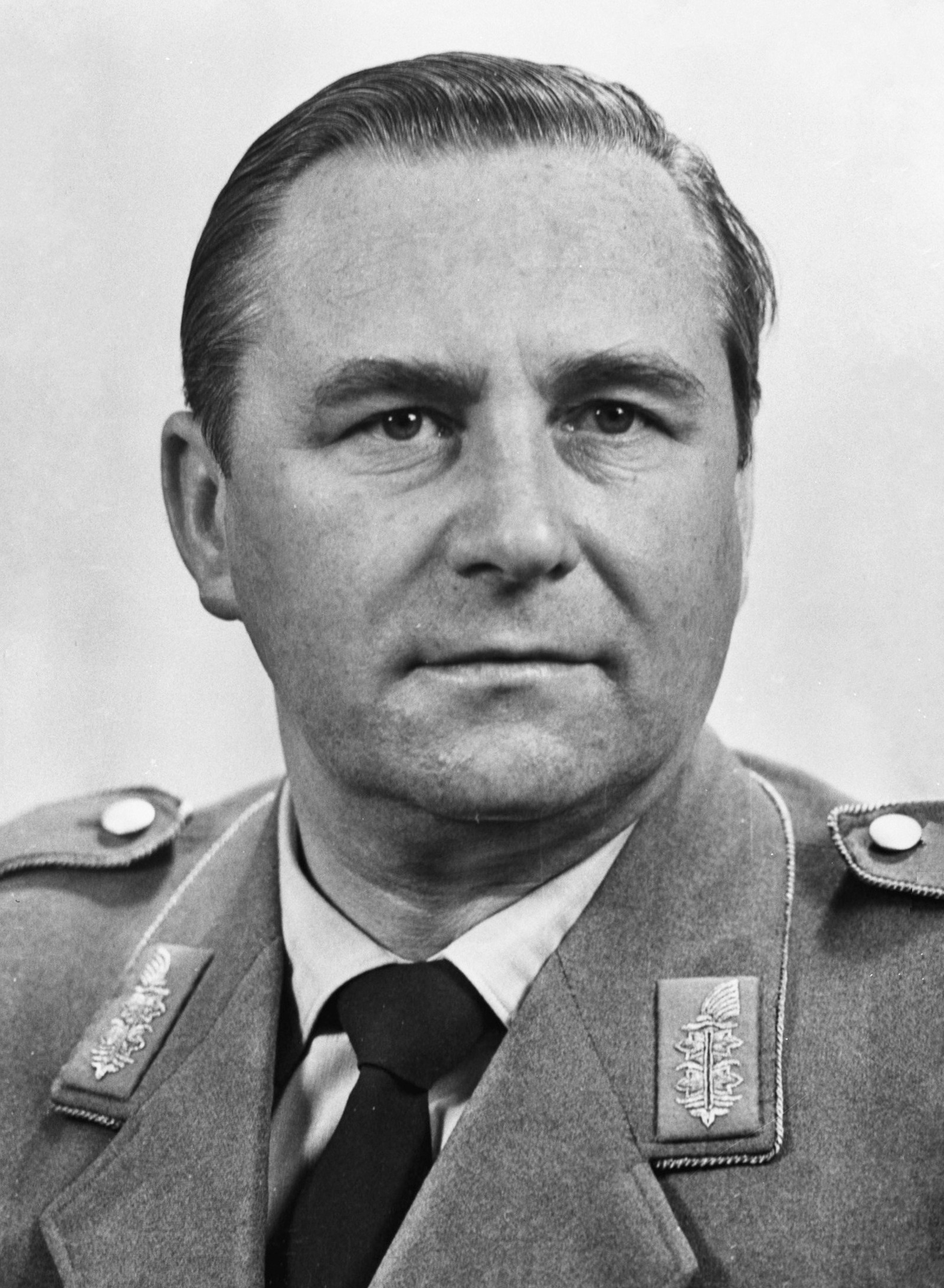
- Albert Schnez, the founder of the Schnez-Truppe. Following rearmanent, Schnez became a Generalleutnant in the Bundeswehr (1967).
- Active: 1949–1955
- Country: West Germany
- Type: Paramilitary
- Size: 2,000 (initial); 40,000 (total)

Commanders
- Notable commanders: Albert Schnez

The Schnez-Truppe or Schnez Organisation was an illegal clandestine paramilitary organisation formed in West Germany in 1949 by veterans of the Wehrmacht and Waffen-SS under the leadership of Albert Schnez. The paramilitary was intended to fight against the Soviet Union in the event of an invasion or German communists in a civil war. It has been reported as having been founded with a membership of some 2,000 former officers; later obtaining a total strength of up to 40,000 members.

The organisation was active in the US occupation zone in southern Germany, and aimed to field up to four armoured divisions in case of war. It was to become active in case of an attack by East Germany in a domestic German conflict similar to the Korean War, but without outside interference.

== History ==
The organisation was formed in secret in 1949 by Albert Schnez, who had risen to the rank of colonel in the Wehrmacht during World War II. The aim of the secret army formed by Schnez was to liberate Germany if an invasion by the Soviet Union occurred. Initially, the secret army would retreat to a foreign country, possibly Switzerland or Spain, the latter being ruled by Francisco Franco.

Schnez's secret army was to have weapons supplied by the West German police, with the help of Anton Grasser, inspector general of the police and a former Wehrmacht general, who had been privately employed by Schnez after the war before he joined the police. Schnez also organised road transport for his forces through logistics companies.

The organisation engaged in surveillance of left-leaning politicians, like the outspoken member of the Social Democratic Party of Germany faction in the German Parliament, Fritz Erler. In case of war, the secret army was planned to be used against communists in West Germany. Schnez was in contact with other right-wing organisations and individuals in Germany, such as Otto Skorzeny, in relation to resistance to a Soviet invasion.

In 1951, Schnez offered the service of his organisation to the German intelligence service, the Gehlen Organization, the predecessor of the Bundesnachrichtendienst, to provide black lists of potentially left-leaning individuals as well as, in one case, profiling a member of the police as Halbjude (half-Jew).

West German Chancellor Konrad Adenauer became aware of the secret army around 1951 and informed leading opposition politicians of its activities but did not order any decisive action against Schnez and shied away from conflict with World War II veterans. Instead, he ordered the domestic intelligence services to monitor the organisation and provide small-scale financial support. Within the Gehlen Organisation, the Schnez-Truppe received the code name Unternehmen Versicherungen (Operation Insurance). Attempts by Skorzeny to establish a similar organisation to the Schnez-Truppe were seen more critically by the Gehlen Organization, as he was considered too unpredictable.

The fate of the secret army is unknown, but leading figures of the Schnez-Truppe joined the then newly formed West German armed forces, the Bundeswehr, in 1955. Among them was Adolf Heusinger, first Inspector General of the Bundeswehr and Chairman of the NATO Military Committee from 1961 to 1964, and Hans Speidel, Supreme Commander of NATO ground forces in Central Europe from 1957 to 1963. Albert Schnez also rose to the rank of Inspector General of the Bundeswehr and finally retired in 1971. He had become an obstacle to the reforms of the armed forces Defence Minister Helmut Schmidt.

The general public in Germany was unaware of the Schnez-Truppe until 2014, when files relating to it were declassified by the Bundesnachrichtendienst after they had been rediscovered in 2011. The declassified files were reviewed by the German historian Agilolf Keßelring, the grandson of Albert Kesselring, who was part of an independent commission to study the early history of the German intelligence service. The file on the Schnez-Truppe in the archive of the Bundesnachrichtendienst in Pullach, Bavaria, was over 300 pages long.

The Schnez-Truppe was part of a larger movement in West Germany at the time, codenamed the Windhund-Bewegung (Greyhound movement) and based on the insignia of the 116th Panzer Division. Gerhard von Schwerin, former commander of the division, served as a consultant in military and security matters for the West German government under Adenauer. West Germany, not armed at the time, was concerned with its own inability to defend itself after the outbreak of the Korean War. The main aim was to have a counterforce to the Kasernierte Volkspolizei of East Germany in case of a Korea-like scenario if the East attacked.

According to intelligence reports at the time, the Kasernierte Volkspolizei possessed almost 1,300 tanks, of which 47 were heavy and 480 medium battle tanks. The Schnez-Truppe was to field four armoured divisions, to be deployed in case of a German-only war between East and West with no outside interference. The tanks for the armoured divisions, however, would have had to be provided by the US Army, as West Germany possessed none at the time, and Schnez was most active in southern Germany, particularly Württemberg and Bavaria, in the former US occupation zone. The historian Agilolf Keßelring concluded that Schnez's activities were almost certainly known to US intelligence agencies. The Schnez-Truppe was organised down to the company level and consisted predominantly of members of former German elite tank divisions.

== Assessment ==
The Schnez-Truppe never came close to a similar status and structure to the post-First World War Freikorps. The German historian Sven Felix Kellerhoff concluded that the organisation was part of the "prehistory" of the Bundeswehr. In Kellerhoff's conclusion, the organisation was known to the German government, the German political opposition, German intelligence agencies and the US authorities in Germany. The Schnez-Truppe was a political risk, but given the lack of any native defensive capability in West Germany, it was a necessary measure to counter the perceived threat from communist East Germany.

== See also ==
- Black Reichswehr
- Operation Gladio
