= Franz-Joseph Schulze =

German general (1918–2005)

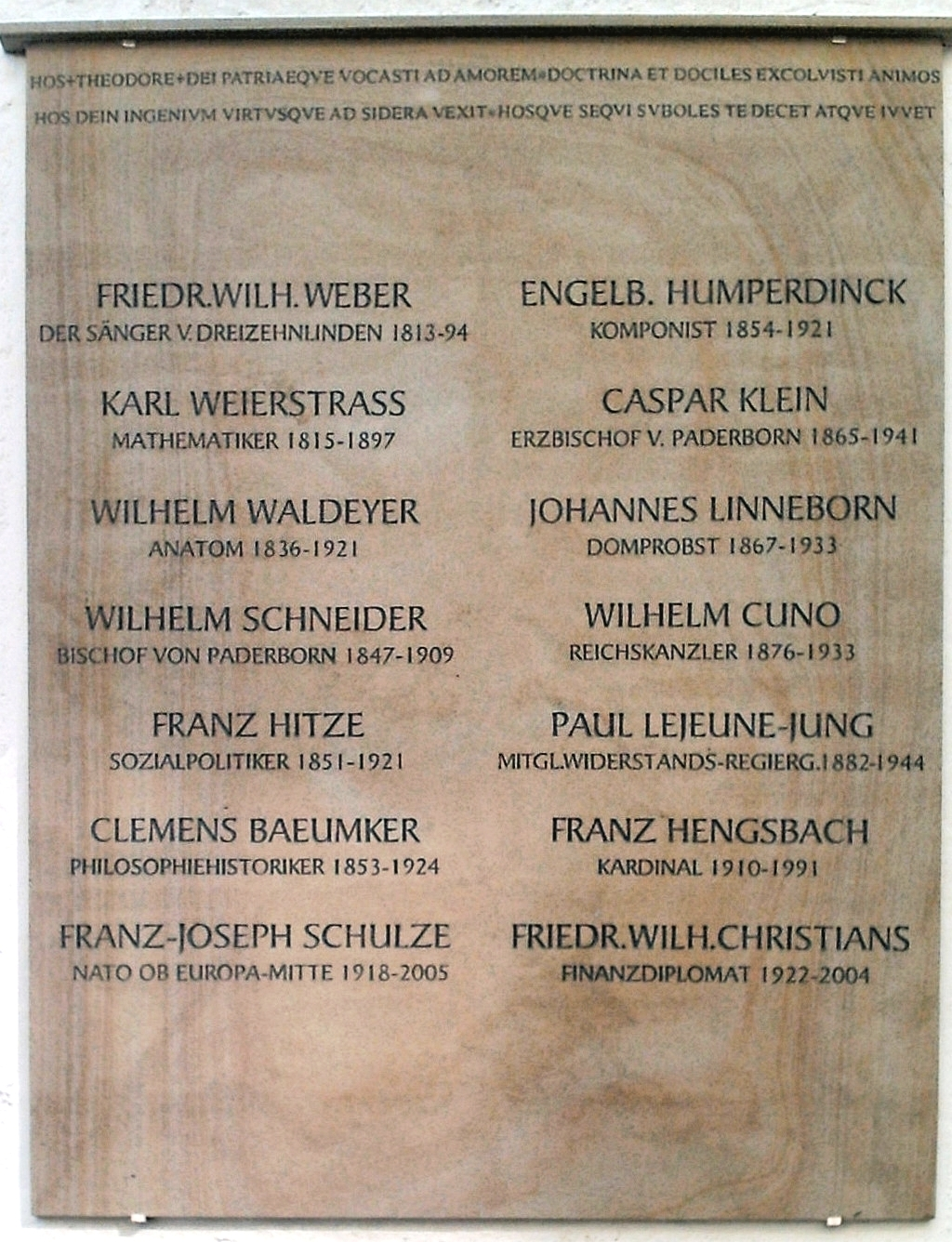
- Born: 18 September 1918
- Died: 31 January 2005 (aged 86)
- Military career
- Allegiance: Nazi Germany; West Germany
- Branch: Luftwaffe (Wehrmacht); Army (Bundeswehr)
- Rank: General
- Commands: 6th Panzergrenadier Division; Joint Force Command Brunssum
- Conflicts: World War II
- Awards: Knight's Cross of the Iron Cross

Franz-Joseph Schulze (18 September 1918 – 31 January 2005) was a German general who was the Commander in Chief, Allied Forces Central Europe (NATO). During World War II, he served in the Luftwaffe and was a recipient of the Knight's Cross of the Iron Cross of Nazi Germany.

== Awards ==
- Knight's Cross of the Iron Cross on 30 November 1944 as Oberleutnant and Chef of the 3./Flak-Sturm-Regiment 241
- Großes Verdienstkreuz mit Stern und Schulterband des Verdienstordens der Bundesrepublik Deutschland
- Commander of the Legion of Honour
- Commander of the Legion of Merit

Military offices
Preceded by General Karl Schnell	Commander in Chief, Allied Forces Central Europe (NATO); 7 January 1977 – 30 September 1979	Succeeded by General Ferdinand von Senger und Etterlin
Preceded by Generalmajor Karl Schnell	Commander of 6th Panzergrenadier Division (Bundeswehr); 15 December 1970 – 31 March 1973	Succeeded by Generalmajor Johannes Poeppel
