= Albert Schnez =

German military officer

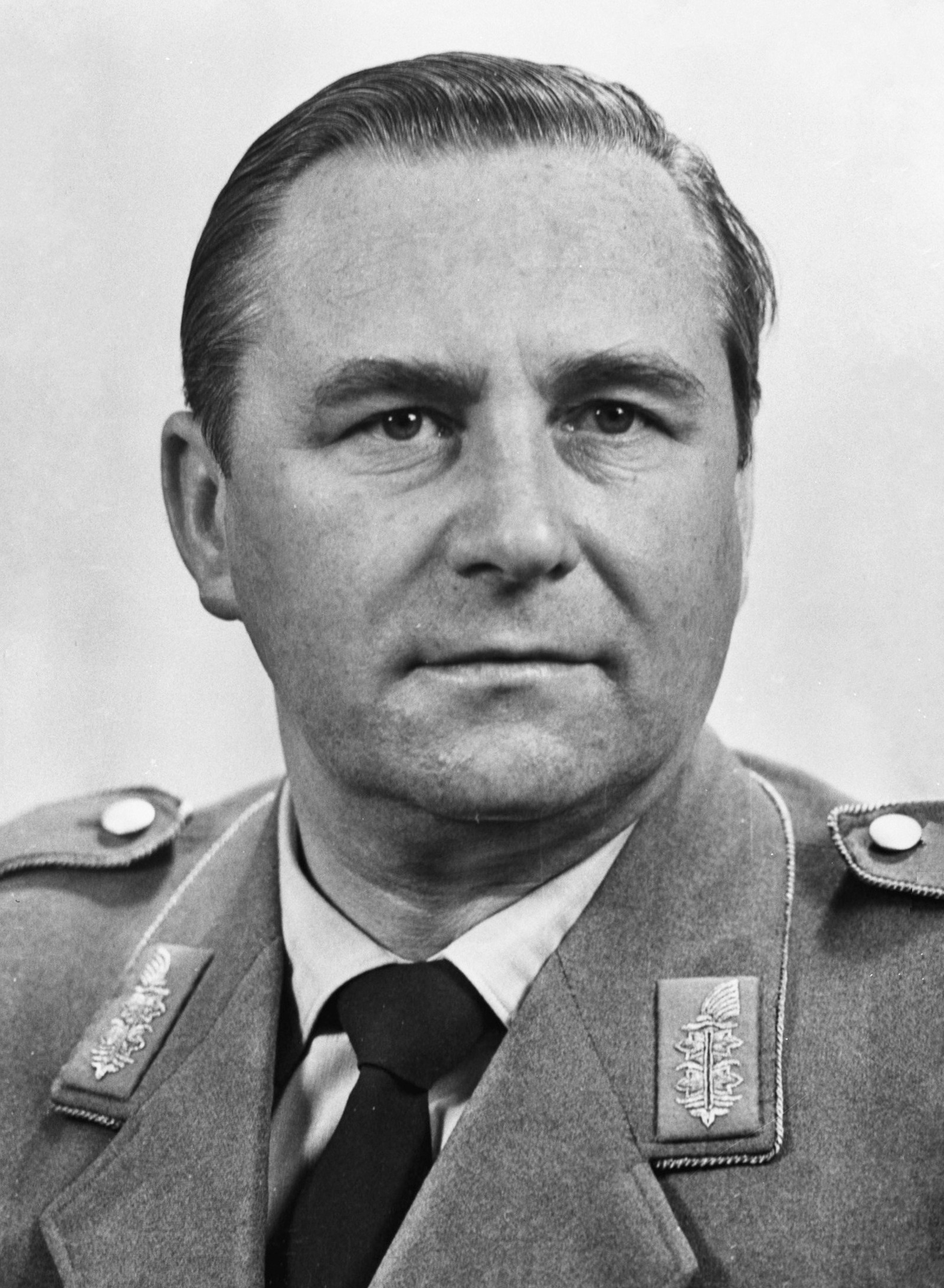
- Albert Schnez in 1967
- Born: 30 August 1911; Abtsgmünd, Kingdom of Württemberg, German Empire
- Died: 26 April 2007 (aged 95); Bonn, Germany
- Military career
- Allegiance: Weimar Republic; Nazi Germany; West Germany
- Branch: Reichsheer; German Army; German Army
- Service years: 1930–1945; 1957–1971
- Rank: Generalleutnant
- Unit: 25th Panzergrenadier Division
- Commands: CS Armed Forces Staff (1960); 5th Panzer Division (1962); III Corps (1965); Inspector of the Army (1968)
- Awards: German Cross in Gold (1944); Federal Cross of Merit (1971)

Albert Schnez (30 August 1911 – 26 April 2007) was an officer in three successive German armies: the Reichswehr, the Wehrmacht, and finally the Bundeswehr, the armed forces of the modern Federal Republic of Germany. He was involved in the debate on the internal leadership of the newly formed Bundeswehr and was close to the German defense minister, Franz Josef Strauss. Schnez served from 1968 to 1971 with the rank of lieutenant-general (Generalleutnant) as the Inspector of the Army.

From 1949, Schnez, together with other veterans of the Wehrmacht and Waffen-SS, built a clandestine shadow army, the "Schnez-Truppe", that intended to fight against the Soviet Union in the event of an invasion, or German communists during a civil war. By 1951, Chancellor Konrad Adenauer had learned of the existence of this secret army and its head Schnez, but evidently declined to act against them.

Military offices
Preceded by Generalleutnant Josef Moll	Inspector of the Army; 1 October 1968 – 30 September 1971	Succeeded by Generalleutnant Ernst Ferber
Preceded by Generalleutnant Heinrich Gaedcke	Commanding General, III Corps (Bundeswehr); 1 April 1965 – 30 September 1968	Succeeded by Generalleutnant Gerd Niepold
Preceded by Generalmajor Günther Pape	Commander of 5th Panzer Division (Bundeswehr); 1 October 1962 – 31 March 1965	Succeeded by Generalmajor Heinz Hükelheim
