= Paul-Georg Kleffel =

German career soldier and officer (1920–2020)

- Born: 7 September 1920; Billerbeck, Germany
- Died: 19 February 2020 (aged 99); Bonn, Germany
- Military career
- Allegiance: Nazi Germany; West Germany
- Branch: Army
- Service years: 1939–45
- Rank: Oberleutnant (Wehrmacht); Generalleutnant (Bundeswehr)
- Units: 3rd Panzer Division; 12th Panzer Division
- Conflicts: World War II: Dnieper–Carpathian Offensive
- Awards: Knight's Cross of the Iron Cross; Order of Merit of the Federal Republic of Germany

Paul-Georg Kleffel (7 September 1920 – 19 February 2020 in Bonn) was a German mechanized infantry commander and recipient of the Knight's Cross of the Iron Cross during World War II. The Knight's Cross of the Iron Cross, and its variants were the highest awards in the military and paramilitary forces of Nazi Germany during World War II. After the war he joined the Bundeswehr of West Germany and achieved a general's rank.

== Career ==
Oberleutnant Kleffel was a company commander in the reconnaissance battalion of the 3rd Panzer Division during early 1944. During the division’s defense of Orhei, on 13 April, the Soviets succeeded in reaching a defile in regimental strength just short of a patch of woods to the east of Orhei. From where his company was positioned Kleffel determined if the Russians made it to the woods they would be in a position to compromise the division’s entire defensive position. He launched a counterattack with his eight APCs, and despite fire from Russian AT guns he was able to reach the defile and opened fire, scattering the Russian infantry that were gathered there. He continued to pursue the Russian regiment across the bridge where it had come from, inflicting heavy losses, and pulled back across before the Russians were able to take countermeasures. For his successful spoiling attack Kleffel was awarded the Knight’s Cross.

== Awards & decorations ==
- Iron Cross
  - 2nd Class
  - 1st Class
- Knight's Cross of the Iron Cross on 14 May 1944 as Chef 4./Panzer-Aufklärungs-Abteilung 3
- German Cross in Gold on 16 November 1943 as Oberleutnant 4./Panzer-Aufklärungs-Abteilung 3
- Officer Cross of the Order of Merit of the Federal Republic of Germany 1973
- Commander Cross of the Order of Merit of the Federal Republic of Germany 1979

Military offices
Preceded by Generalmajor Hans Teusen	Commander of 12. Panzer-Division (Bundeswehr); 1 October 1973 – 30 September 1976	Succeeded by Generalmajor Gert Bastian
Preceded by Generalleutnant Franz Pöschl	Commander of III. Corps (Bundeswehr); 1 April 1978 – 30 September 1980	Succeeded by Generalleutnant Wolfgang Altenburg
