= 11th Panzergrenadier Division (Bundeswehr) =

Coordinates: 53.162372°N 8.247439°E

- 11th Panzergrenadier Division insignia
- Active: 1 May 1959 - 30 September 1994
- Country: Federal Republic of Germany
- Role: Mechanized infantry
- Size: Division
- Part of: German I Corps

The 11th Panzergrenadier Division (11. Panzergrenadierdivision) was a West German mechanized infantry formation. It was part of the I Corps of the Bundeswehr. I Corps was part of NATO's Northern Army Group (NORTHAG), along with the I Belgian Corps, I British Corps, and the I Netherlands Corps. In the wake of military restructuring brought about by the end of the Cold War, the 11th Panzergrenadier Division was disbanded in 1994.

The division was constituted in May 1959 as part of the I Corps of the Bundeswehr. At that time, it commanded the 32nd Panzergrenadier and 33rd Panzer Brigades. In 1961, the 31st Panzergrenadier Brigade was also subordinated to the division. Division headquarters was quartered at Oldenburg.

The division provided assistance to civilians during the North Sea flood of 1962 and helped fight wildfires on the Luneberg Heath in summer 1975. In September 1990, elements of the division assisted with the removal of old U.S. chemical munitions during Operation Steel Box, including medics from Leer (Ostfriesland) who were at Nordenham for a few weeks. From November 1990 to July 1991, elements of the division provided security, maintenance, and transport in the ports of Emden and Nordenham for U.S. and British troops redeploying to the Gulf War. The 11th Panzergrenadier Division was disbanded in 1994.

== Commanders ==
Nr.	Name	Start of command	End of command
12	Generalmajor Karsten Oltmanns	1992	1994
11	Generalmajor Hubertus Senff	1987	1992
10	Generalmajor Ernst Klaffus	1985	1987
9	Generalmajor Hans Hoster	1983	1985
8	Generalmajor Hans-Henning von Sandrart	1980	1983
7	Generalmajor Meinhard Glanz	1977	1980
6	Generalmajor Gottfried Ewert	1974	1977
5	Generalmajor Hans-Heinrich Klein	1970	1974
4	Generalmajor Werner Ebeling	1968	1970
3	Generalmajor Otto Uechtritz	1964	1968
2	Generalmajor Cord von Hobe	1961	1964
1	Generalmajor Heinrich Gaedcke	1959	1960
