= Johannes Poeppel =

Inspector of the Army (1979–81)

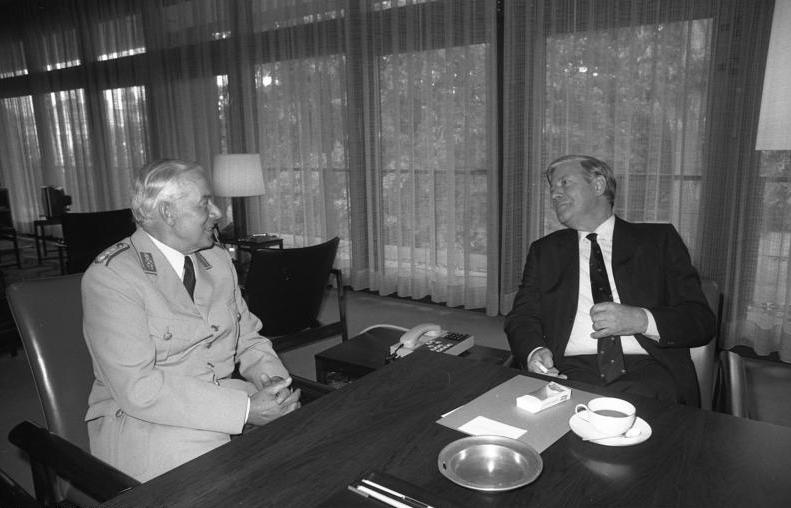
- Poeppel and German chancellor Helmut Schmidt in German Chancellery 1981
- Born: 20 July 1921; Schivelbein, Farther Pomerania (today Świdwin, Poland)
- Died: 29 September 2007 (aged 86)
- Military career
- Allegiance: Nazi Germany Federal Republic of Germany
- Service years: 1939–1945; 1955 – 1981
- Rank: Generalleutnant
- Nickname: Hans
- Unit: Artillerieregiment 32 (1939–1945)
- Commands: Field Artillery Battalion 31; Panzergrenadierbrigade 1; 6. Panzergrenadierdivision; Inspector of the Army
- Awards: Commander's Cross of the Order of Merit

Johannes "Hans" Poeppel (20 July 1921 – 29 September 2007) was a general in the German Bundeswehr. He served as Inspekteur des Heeres (Inspector of the Army) 1979–81.

== Early life ==
Poeppel was born in Schivelbein, Farther Pomerania (today Świdwin, Poland) and passed his Abitur at a Napola institution in Berlin in 1939.

== Career ==
=== Wehrmacht ===
That year he passed his Abitur, Poeppel joined the Wehrmacht as an officer cadet and served in the Artillerieregiment 32 throughout the Second World War. In 1941 while serving in Serbia, he ordered the massacres of Serbian Jews. By the end of the war, he had attained the rank of Hauptmann (captain), and managed to avoid Soviet captivity.

=== Post-war ===
In 1947–49, he studied at the Pedagogic Institute in Celle, including a semester at the University of Manchester. He started to work as a teacher in 1949 in Wriedel (Uelzen) and became an academic assistant at the Pedagogic University of Osnabrück in 1952.

=== Bundeswehr ===
After the founding and organization of the Bundeswehr in 1955, Poeppel volunteered and was reinstated at his former rank of captain. Poeppel passed his general staff training at the Führungsakademie der Bundeswehr in 1958–61 and served on the Staff of the I. Korps in Münster. He became Staff Officer to the Generalinspekteure Friedrich Foertsch and Heinrich Trettner and commanded the Feldartilleriebataillon 31 in Lüneburg. In 1967–69, he worked at the Federal Ministry of Defense in Bonn.

Within the Bundeswehr, Poeppel was known as an advocate of the "traditionalist" school, which saw the Bundeswehr as a continuation of the Wehrmacht, the Reichswehr, the Royal Prussian Army and ultimately could trace its descent all the way back to the army founded by the Great Elector of Brandenburg in 1640. Against the "traditionalist" school with its emphasis on the continuity of Prussian-German military history, there were the "reformers" who argued that the Bundeswehr was a new force unconnected to the past and who placed an emphasis on the discontinuity between the Reich that had existed between 1871-1945 and the new Federal Republic founded in 1949. As such, the "reformers" argued that the Bundeswehr should not be venerating men such as Field Marshal Paul von Hindenburg and Admiral Günther Lütjens as heroes. Poeppel argued in a memo because the Defense Minister Theodor Blank had stated the intellectual role models for the Bundeswehr were to be Carl von Clausewitz, August Neidhardt von Gneisenau, and Gerhard von Scharnhorst, that in his view that the Bundeswehr was a continuation of the old Prussian Army, and as such figures from the past like Hindenburg and Lütjens were to be venerated in the new Bundeswehr.

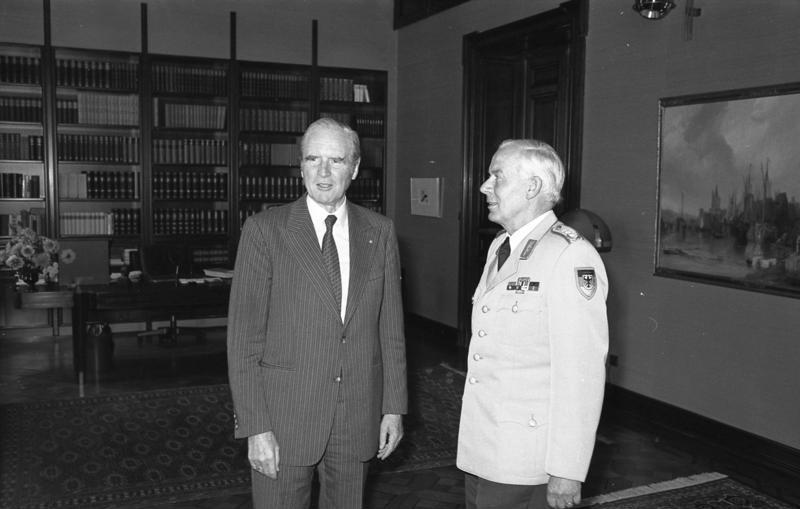
Poeppel (r.) at his retirement next to President Karl Carstens in 1981

On 1 January 1970, Poeppel became the commander of Panzergrenadierbrigade 1 in Hildesheim until 31 March 1973 and until 31 March 1978 of the 6. Panzergrenadierdivision in Neumünster. There he was promoted to Generalmajor.

On 1 April 1978 Poeppel returned to Bonn and became the Deputy Inspector of the Army and a year later Inspector (Inspekteur de sHeeres). Poeppel retired on 1 October 1981.

In 1983, the American historian Christopher Browning in an article published in Militärgeschichtiche Mitteiblugen entitled "Wehrmacht Reprisal Policy and the Mass Murder of Jews in Serbia" accused Poeppel of being involved in the massacres of Serbian Jews in 1941. Poeppel was never prosecuted because German law maintained a distinction between murder and being accomplice to murder-the latter defined as killing someone while obeying orders in the service of the state. Only those who killed on their own initiative in the National Socialist era were considered to have committed murder in the legal sense. In 1968, the Bundstag passed a law that retroactively declared the statute of limitations for being an accomplice to murder as expiring within 15 years of the crime. In 1969, it was estimated that because of the new statute of limitations for the crime of accomplice to murder that 90% of those Germans suspected of war crimes and crimes against humanity during the National Socialist era now enjoyed legal immunity as these people could argue that they had only committed their crimes while obeying orders. As the massacres that Poeppel had ordered took place in 1941 and all of the evidence indicated that he was merely obeying the orders of his superiors, the statute of limitations for these crimes expired in 1956 and as such he enjoyed legal immunity.

== Personal life ==
Poeppel was married in 1947 to Edelgard, "the girl next door" to him in Pomerania, and the couple had two children. Their son, Burkhardt, also became a Bundeswehr officer; their daughter, Susanne studied for an advanced degree at the Pädagogische Hochschule in Bonn. Poeppel was an able and ardent tennis player all his life.

== Bibliography ==
- Abenheim, Donald (2014). Reforging the Iron Cross: The Search for Tradition in the West German Armed Forces. Princeton: Princeton University Press. ISBN 1-4008-5977-8.
- Hans Poeppel, Wilhelm-Karl Prinz von Preußen, Karl-Günther von Hase, Die Soldaten der Wehrmacht, 6. Auflage, München 2000. ISBN 3-7766-2057-9
- Wette, Wolfram (2006). The Wehrmacht: history, myth, reality. Cambridge (Mass.): Harvard University Press. ISBN 0-674-02213-0.

Military offices
Preceded by Generalleutnant Horst Hildebrandt	Inspector of the Army; 1 April 1979–1 October 1981	Succeeded by Generalleutnant Meinhard Glanz
Preceded by Generalleutnant Rüdiger von Reichert	Deputy Chief of Staff of the Federal Armed Forces; 1 April 1978–30 March 1979	Succeeded by Generalleutnant Helmut Heinz
Preceded by Generalmajor Franz-Joseph Schulze	Commander of 6th Panzergrenadier Division (Bundeswehr); 1 April 1973 – 31 March 1978	Succeeded by Generalmajor Hans-Joachim Mack
