= Gert Bastian =

German general and politician (1923–1992)

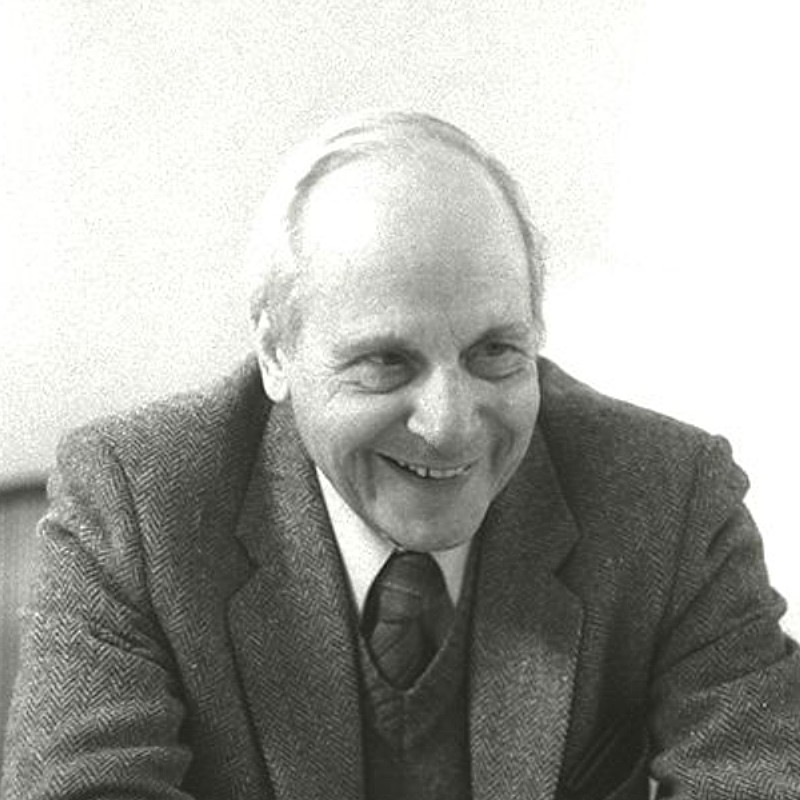
- Bastian in 1987

Member of the Bundestag
- In office 29 March 1983 – 18 February 1987

Personal details
- Born: 26 March 1923 Munich, Weimar Republic
- Died: c. 1 October 1992 (aged 69) Bonn, Germany
- Party: Christian Social Union (1950s); German Green Party (1983–1987)
- Military service
- Allegiance: Nazi Germany (to 1945); Federal Republic of Germany
- Branch: German Army; Bundeswehr
- Service years: 1941–45; 1956–80
- Rank: Generalmajor
- Unit: 12th Tank Division
- Conflicts: World War II

Gert Bastian (26 March 1923 – c. 1 October 1992) was a German military officer and politician with the German Green Party.

== Biography ==
Born in Munich, Bastian volunteered for the Wehrmacht in 1941, at the age of nineteen. In World War II he served on the Eastern Front, being wounded by a bullet in the right arm and in the head by a grenade fragment. He was also hit by American machine gun fire in France.

After the war, he started a business that failed and then rejoined the military. From 1956 to 1980 Bastian served in the Bundeswehr—joining as a first lieutenant, promoted in 1962 to the position of general staff officer/officer in the army command staff, and in 1974 promoted to the rank of Brigadier General, chief of staff in the army office—ending his service as a divisional commander with the rank of Major General. During this period Bastian's politics changed radically. In the 1950s he had been a member of the Christian Social Union in his native Bavaria. Yet Bastian was also an opponent of the planned stationing of medium-range missiles with nuclear warheads in Europe and joined the peace movement.

In 1980, he outlined those views in a memorandum to the West German government, asking to retire in the face of what he considered unacceptable military policies; his request was rejected and he resigned. In 1981 he was the joint founder of a group called "Generals for Peace". In the 26 April 1994 edition of The Independent newspaper, Günter Bohnsack, who spent 26 years in the Active Measures Department of the Stasi, claimed that "Generals for Peace was conceived, organised and financed by the Stasi ... This created a real power that was in line with Moscow's ideas ... and we always controlled this through our intelligence services in Moscow and East Berlin."

In the 1980s, Bastian was, together with his partner Petra Kelly, one of the most important West German supporters of the opposition in the German Democratic Republic.

== Death and killing of Petra Kelly ==
On 19 October 1992, the decomposing bodies of Bastian and Kelly were discovered in the bedroom of their house in Bonn by police officials after they received a call from both Bastian's wife and Kelly's grandmother who reported that they had not heard from either Bastian or Kelly for a few weeks. The police asserted that Kelly was shot dead while sleeping by Bastian, who then died of suicide. Police estimated the deaths had most likely occurred on 1 October, but the exact time of death could not be pinpointed due to the delay in finding the bodies and their resultant state of decomposition. Neither Bastian nor Kelly left any written message or other evidence useful to explain the reason of the homicide-suicide. Theories have been put forward that Bastian was afraid of an imminent opening of Stasi files revealing his role as an agent of the East German secret police, but no such evidence has emerged.

Bastian was buried in the Nordfriedhof in Schwabing, Munich.

Military offices
Preceded by Generalmajor Paul-Georg Kleffel	Commander of 12th Panzer Division (Bundeswehr); 1 October 1976 – 21 January 1980	Succeeded by Generalmajor Gerd-Helmut Komossa
