= Reinhardt's fund =

Monetary bank where valuables from Jews were kept

Reinhardt's fund (named after Aktion Reinhardt, which in turn was named after Reinhard Heydrich) was a group of Nazi German bank accounts where money and valuables stolen from concentration and death camp victims were kept. The money was used to finance a number of Nazi construction projects, including the construction of new concentration camps.
