= 6th Panzergrenadier Division =

Coordinates: 54.082178°N 9.968977°E

- 6th Panzergrenadier Division insignia
- Active: 1 Nov 1958 - 30 Sep 1997
- Country: Germany
- Branch: Army
- Role: Mechanized infantry
- Size: Division
- Part of: I Corps (Bundeswehr) (Peace time); Allied Land Forces Schleswig-Holstein and Jutland (War time) LANDJUT (Hostilities)

The 6th Panzergrenadier Division (6. Panzergrenadierdivision) was a West German mechanized infantry formation. It was part of the I Corps of the Bundeswehr during peacetime, but fell under Allied Land Forces Schleswig-Holstein and Jutland Command in case of war. In the wake of military restructuring brought about by the end of the Cold War, the 6th Panzergrenadier Division was disbanded in 1994, although a military readiness command incorporated the division's name until 1997.

The then-named 6th Grenadier Division was constituted in November 1958 as part of the I Corps of the Bundeswehr. Initially, the division was organized with two brigade-sized battle-groups, "A6" and "B6". In 1959, these units were renamed and a third brigade was added, with the brigades being the 16 and 17th Panzergrenadier Brigades and the 18th Panzer Brigade. At this time, the division was retitled the 6th Panzergrenadier Division. Division headquarters was located at Neumünster.

The division provided assistance to civilians during floods in 1962 and 1976, and also fought forest and moor fires in 1959.

In the 1980s, it had a strength of around 30,000 men, 5,800 wheeled vehicles and 1,200 tracked vehicles, including 252 Leopard I tanks.

The division was given the strategic mission of defending Schleswig-Holstein had a Soviet attack against Germany taken place during the Cold War. In such an event, the division would have been subordinated to NATO's AFNORTH command. With the end of the Cold War, the German Army restructured and the 6th Panzergrenadier Division was disbanded in 1994.

== Commanders ==
Nr.	Name	Start of command	End of command
12	Generalmajor Jürgen von Falkenhayn	1990	1995
11	Generalmajor Klaus-Christoph Steinkopff	1986	1990
10	Generalmajor Wolfgang Malecha	1984	1986
9	Generalmajor Dieter Clauß	1983	1984
8	Generalmajor Konrad Manthey	1979	1983
7	Generalmajor Hans-Joachim Mack	1978	1979
6	Generalmajor Johannes Poeppel	1973	1978
5	Generalmajor Franz-Joseph Schulze	1970	1973
4	Generalmajor Karl Schnell	1968	1970
3	Generalmajor Gerd Niepold	1965	1968
2	Generalmajor Werner Haag	1962	1965
1	Generalmajor Peter von der Groeben	1958	1962
