= III Corps (Bundeswehr) =

Coordinates: 50°21′28″N 7°34′54″E

- Active: 6 April 1957–31 March 1994
- Country: Germany
- Branch: German Army
- Part of: Central Army Group
- Headquarters: Koblenz

Commanders
- Last commander: GenLt Klaus Reinhardt
- Last chief of staff: BrigGen Klaus Frühhaber

III Corps was a corps of the German Army (Bundeswehr Heer) active from 1957 to 1994.

== History ==
The preparation of the staff of the corps took place from 16 March 1957 at Gneisenau-Kaserne, Koblenz; the corps was officially formed on 6 April 1957. Initially, the 2nd Panzergrenadier Division and 5th Panzer Division moved in 1957 from the II Corps to III Corps. The corps was integrated into defence planning from mid-1957, as part of NATO's Central Army Group, commanded by the commander of the U.S. Seventh Army. The area of operations was the FRG-DDR and German-Czechoslovak border in Hesse and Franconia. On 1 December 1958 the 7th Panzer Division was transferred from the III Corps to the I Corps. Among the first corps troops were Ordnance regiment 504 (formed May 16, 1957 in Diez, transferred January 1958 in Koblenz), and Corps Artillery Command 403 (based until 1 July 1957 at Munsterlager, from August 1957 in Koblenz). Under corps command were a rocket artillery battalion, a supply battalion, and a geophysical measurement train.

Smilo Freiherr von Lüttwitz was the first commander of the corps, as a lieutenant general.

Initially from 1959 the corps' troops under Heeresstruktur II consisted of :

- 2nd Panzergrenadier Division (Marburg)
  - Panzergrenadierbrigade 4 (Göttingen)
  - Panzergrenadierbrigade 5 (Kassel)
  - Panzerbrigade 6 (Marburg)
- 5th Panzer Division (Koblenz)
  - Panzergrenadierbrigade 13 (Wetzlar)
  - Panzerbrigade 14 (Koblenz)
  - Panzerbrigade 15 (Koblenz)
- 7th Panzergrenadier (later Panzer) Division (Unna)
  - Panzergrenadierbrigade 19 (Ahlen)
  - Panzerbrigade 21 (Augustdorf)
- Corps Troops

Under Heeresstruktur III from 1970 the 2nd Division was converted into a Jäger or light infantry formation. Creating more Jager troops was intended to provide smaller, more mobile and yet strong anti-tank formations that would be able to fight in the unfavourable terrain of the German low mountain ranges even during a nuclear war. As a "compensation" for the lost tank units, a tank regiment was initially planned as a tactical reserve as corps troops. In contrast to the corresponding tank regiments of the other two corps, however, the formation of this regiment was never ordered. However, the corps was assigned an airborne brigade of the 1st Airborne Division (Bundeswehr) as a reserve. In addition, at the level of the corps troops, the previous army aviation battalion was reorganized into a light and a medium army aviation transport regiment. According to the nomenclature of the other corps commands, the corps artillery command 403 was renamed Artilleriekommando 3 in 1972, and the medical command 253 was renamed Medical Command 3. In January 1977 all three divisions of the III. Corps grew to the three subordinate brigades that had been targeted since the founding of the Bundeswehr. Since 1981 these brigades were then named according to the usual numbering.

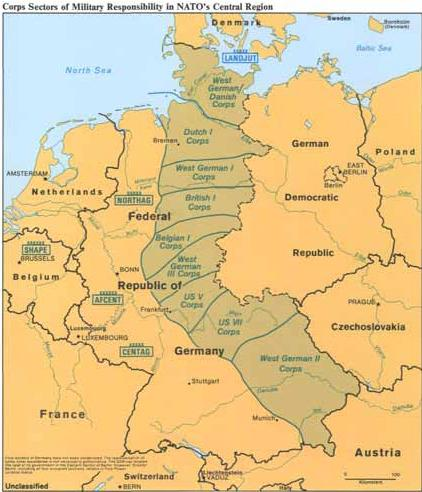
NATO corps sectors in the Central Region in the 1980s

In 1994 the corps headquarters was disbanded and re-designated the headquarters of the German Army Forces Command.

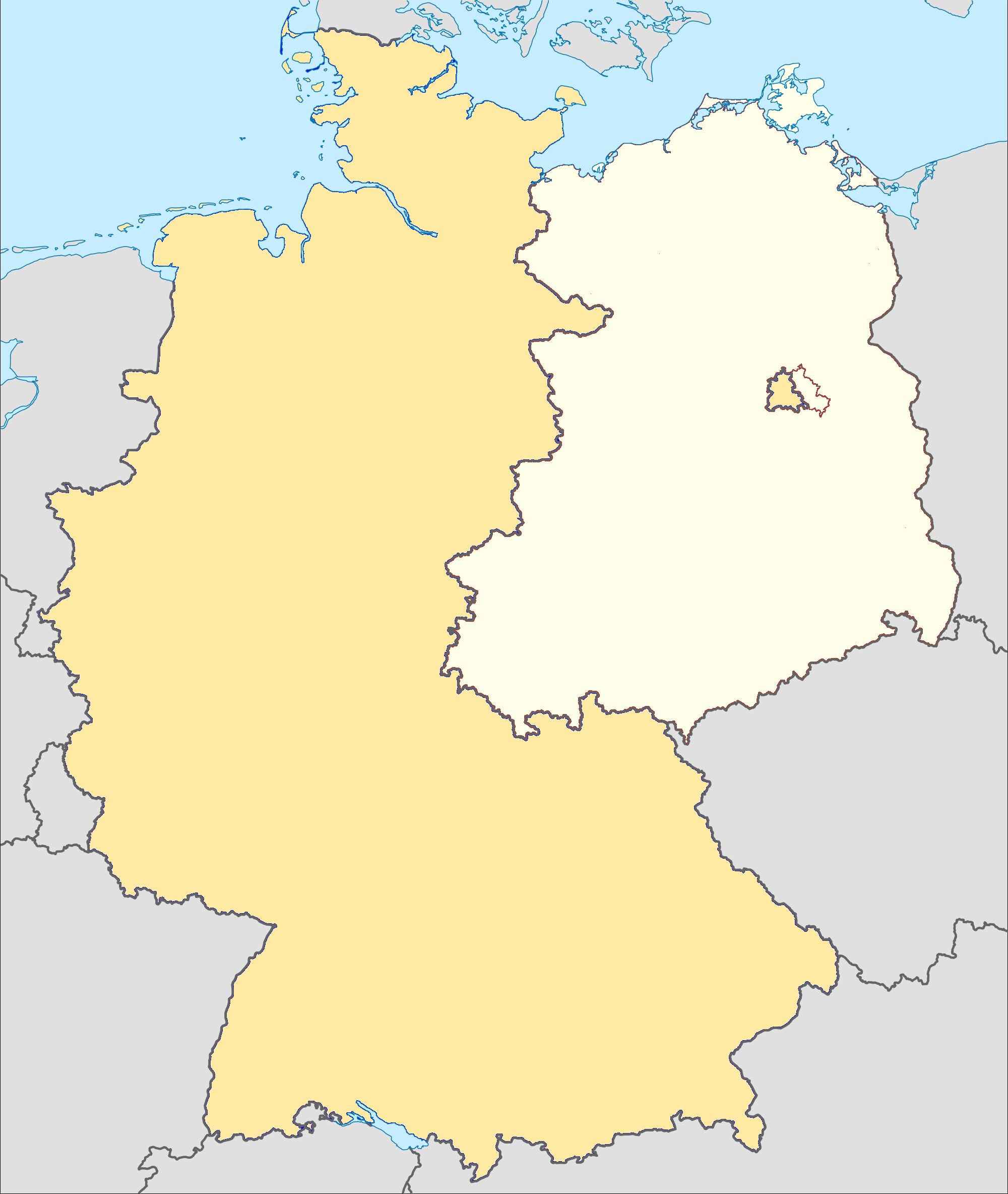
III Corps Deployments 1989
PgD - Panzergrenadier Division, PzD - Panzer Division

At the end of the Cold War in 1989, the corps commanded the 2nd Panzergrenadier, 5th Panzer, and 12th Panzer Divisions.

== Commanding Generals ==
Nr.	Name	Start of command	End of command
13	Generalleutnant Klaus Reinhardt	1 July 1993	31 March 1994
12	Generalleutnant Peter Heinrich Carstens	1 October 1991	30 June 1993
11	Generalmajor Anton Steer	1 October 1990	30 September 1991
10	Generalleutnant Helge Hansen	1 October 1987	30 September 1990
9	Generalleutnant Karl Erich Diedrichs	1 April 1984	30 September 1987
8	Generalleutnant Hans-Joachim Mack	1 April 1983	31 March 1984
7	Generalleutnant Wolfgang Altenburg	1 October 1980	31 March 1983
6	Generalleutnant Paul-Georg Kleffel	1 April 1978	30 September 1980
5	Generalleutnant Franz Pöschl	1 October 1972	31 March 1978
4	Generalleutnant Gerd Niepold	1 October 1968	30 September 1972
3	Generalleutnant Albert Schnez	1 April 1965	30 September 1968
2	Generalleutnant Heinrich Gaedcke	1 January 1961	31 March 1965
1	Generalleutnant Smilo Freiherr von Lüttwitz	1 June 1957	31 December 1960
