= Honour Roll Clasp =

WW2 German military decoration

Honour Roll Clasp Ehrenblattspange
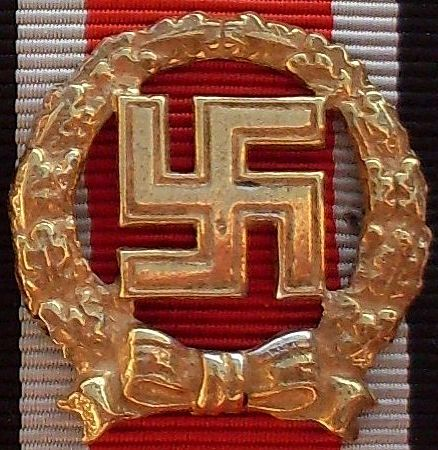
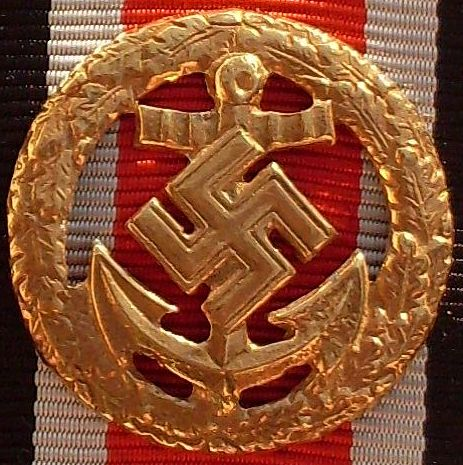
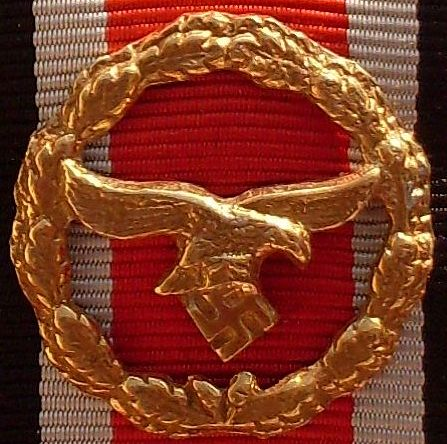
- Army, Navy and Air Force versions
- Type: Military decoration
- Awarded for: At discretion of German High Command
- Country: Nazi Germany
- Presented by: Nazi Germany
- Eligibility: German armed forces
- Campaign: World War II
- Status: Discontinued in 1945
- Established: 30 January 1944

Highlights
- Total: 4,556 (Army version)

The Honour Roll Clasp (German: Ehrenblattspange) was a decoration of Nazi Germany during World War II. There were different versions for the Army (Heer), Air Force (Luftwaffe) and Navy (Kriegsmarine).

== History ==
The Honour Roll of the German Army (German: Ehrenblatt des Deutschen Heeres) was first issued in July 1941 after the German invasion of the Soviet Union. The roll recorded the names of soldiers who had distinguished themselves in combat in an exceptional way, and was published in the Army Ordinance Gazette (Heeres-Verordnungsblatt). Until 30 January 1944 it was a paper award only. On this date, Adolf Hitler introduced a physical decoration to be worn in uniform by those who appeared on the Honour Roll.

A similar Honour Roll of the German Navy (Ehrentafel der Deutschen Kriegsmarine) was instituted in February 1943, with a wearable decoration introduced in May 1944.

The Honour Roll Clasp of the German Air Force (Ehrenblatt der Deutschen Luftwaffe) was instituted on 5 July 1944, with the decoration introduced at the same time. Air Force members who had previously received The Luftwaffe Honour Goblet or the Luftwaffe Honour Plate automatically received the Air Force Honour Roll Clasp.

For all three services, to qualify for the Honour Roll Clasp a recipient must have:

- already have received the Iron Cross in both the first and second class;
- once again (after being awarded the Iron Cross in both classes) distinguished himself in combat; and
- been included in the Honour Roll of the German Army.

Awards were at the discretion of the German High Command and were awarded sparingly to retain a high level of prestige. A total of 4,556 were awarded to members of the army and Waffen-SS. The Waffen-SS was not legally part of the German Army, but were nevertheless eligible on the same conditions as the army.

== Description ==
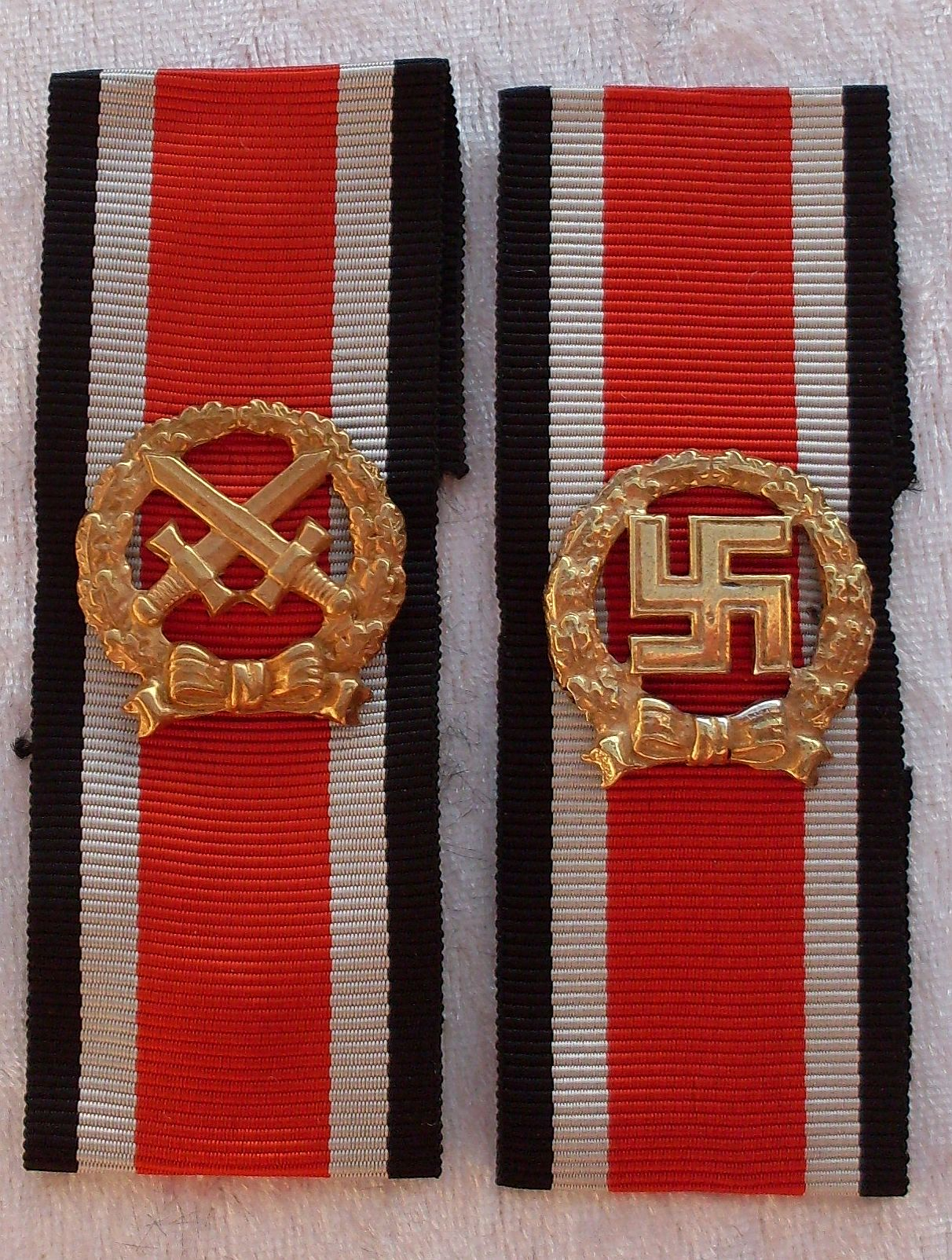
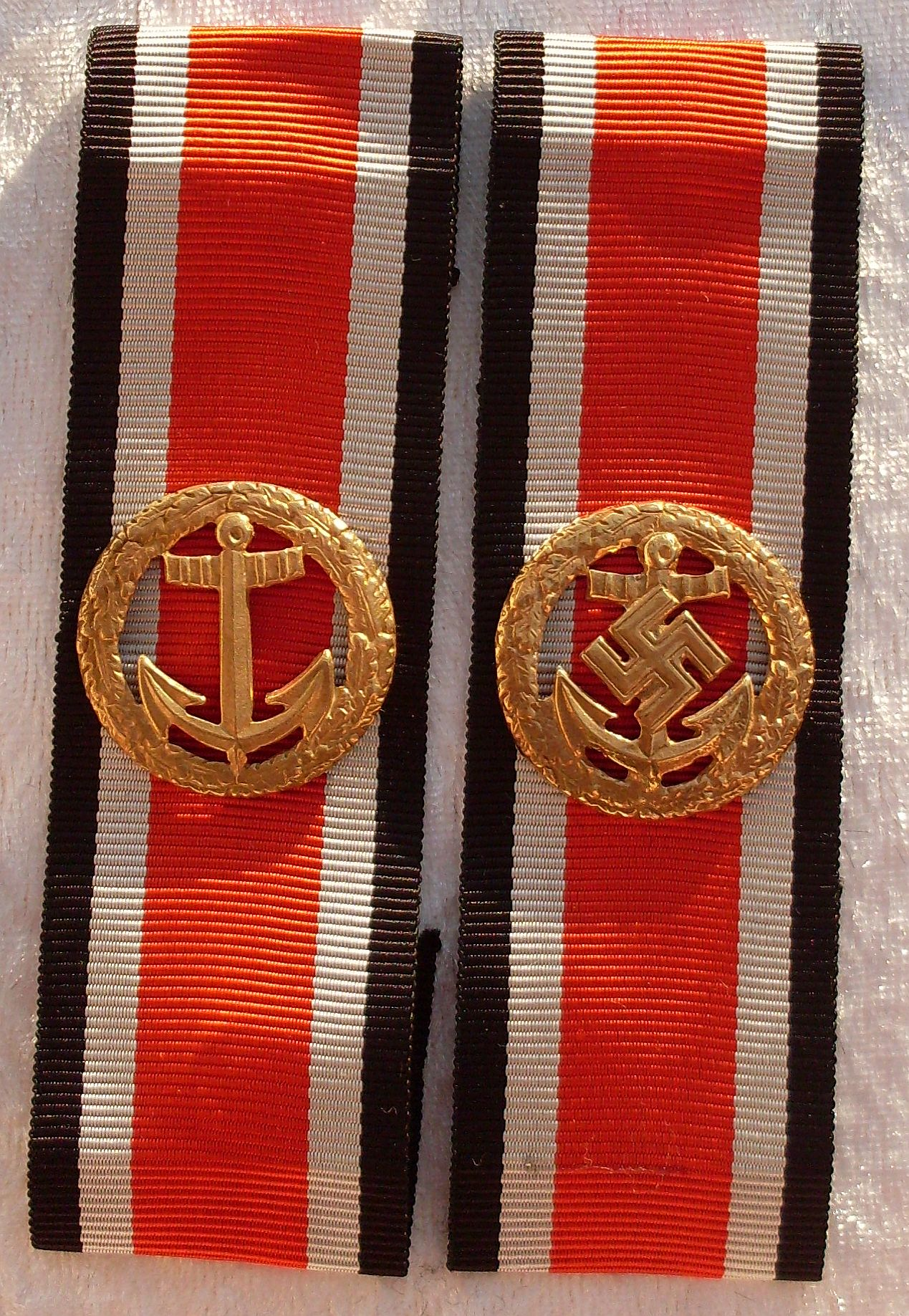
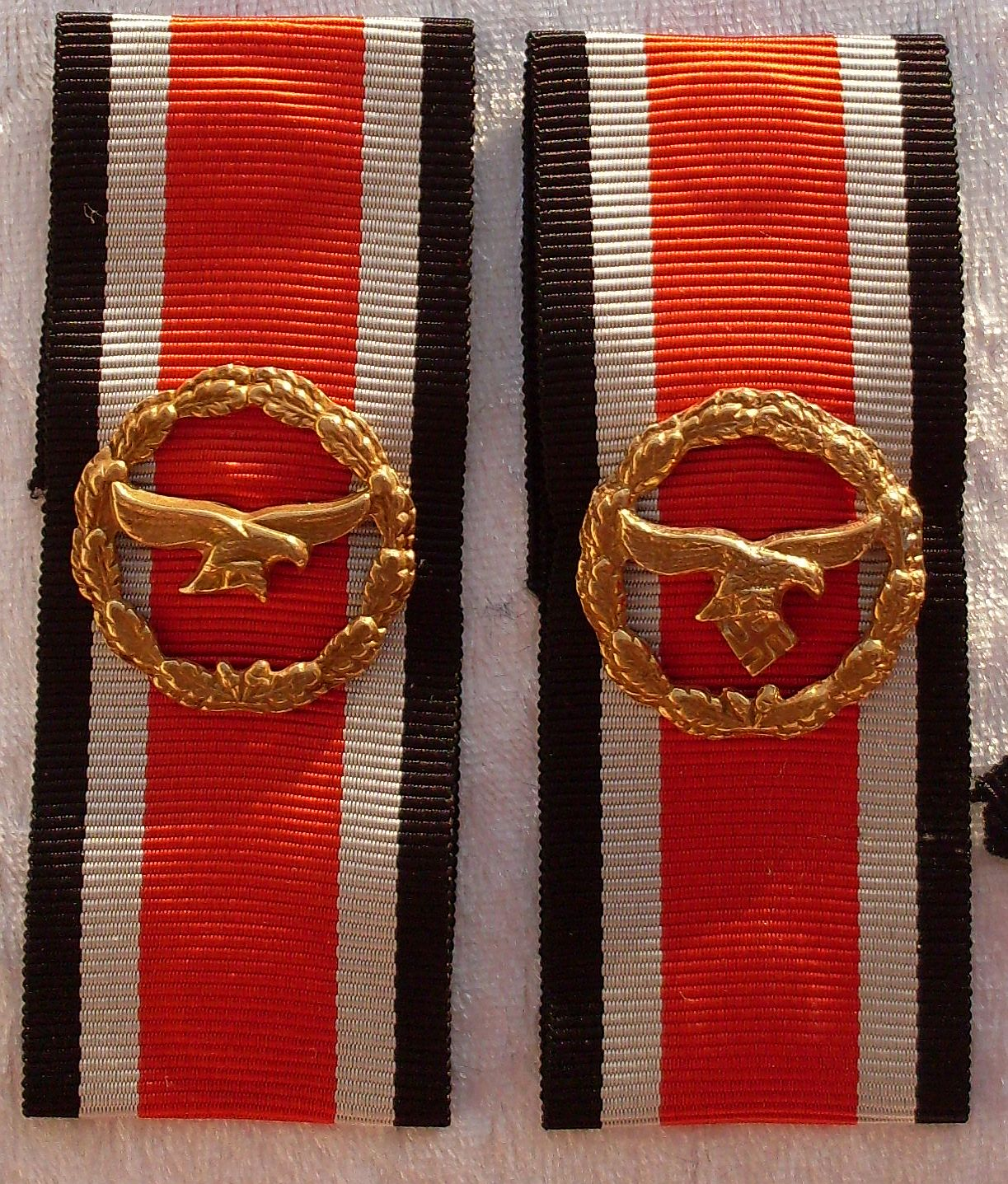
Honour Roll Clasp: Army, Navy and Air Force types, showing both post-war 'de-Nazified' versions and original wartime awards

The Honour Roll clasp of the Army was made of gilt metal. The decoration contained a wreath measuring 24.5 mm across, formed of six bunches of oak leaves on each side. The width of the wreath was 5 mm at the widest point and tapered to the apex where two oak leaves meet tip-to-tip. The height of the badge from base to tip was 26 mm. The swastika was superimposed upon the separately-made wreath and was soldered onto the wreath assembly.

Of the other versions, the Navy clasp comprised a swastika superimposed on an anchor, with the Air Force clasp showing the Luftwaffe eagle, both types displayed within a circular gilt metal oak wreath.

The reverse side of all versions had four pins for attachment to allow securing to a strip of Iron Cross second class ribbon. This ribbon was then looped through the second button hole on the tunic of the recipient. The decoration was not worn on the ribbon of the iron cross when the cross itself was worn.

Nazi era awards were initially banned by the post-war Federal Republic of Germany. In 1957 many World War II military decorations, including the Honour Roll Clasp, were re-authorised for wear. Re-designed to remove the swastika symbol, the army version now displayed two crossed swords in the centre, with the Navy and Air Force clasps unchanged apart from the absence of the swastika. Members of the Bundeswehr could wear the clasp on the ribbon bar, represented by a small replica of the award on an iron cross ribbon.

== Notes ==
=== References ===
- Angolia, John (1987). For Führer and Fatherland: Military Awards of the Third Reich. R. James Bender Publishing. ISBN 0912138149.
- Klietmann, Kurt-Gerhard (1981). Auszeichnungen des Deutschen Reiches. 1936–1945, 11 Auflage (in German). Motorbuch, Stuttgart. ISBN 3-87943-689-4.
- Littlejohn, David; Dodkins, Colonel C. M. (1968). Orders, Decorations, Medals and Badges of the Third Reich. R. James Bender Publishing, California. ISBN 978-0854200801.
