= Headquarters Allied Force Command Heidelberg =

Former NATO formation

Headquarters Allied Force Command Heidelberg (HQ FC Heidelberg)
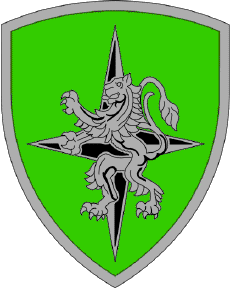
- CENTAG Badge
- Active: CENTAG: 1952-1993; LANDCENT: 1993-2000; JHQ CENT: 2000-2004; CC-Land HQ Heidelberg: 2004-2010; HQ FC Heidelberg: 2010-2013
- Disbanded: 1 April 2013
- Role: Headquarters
- Part of: Joint Force Command Brunssum
- Garrison/HQ: Campbell Barracks, Germany

Headquarters Allied Force Command Heidelberg (HQ FC Heidelberg) was a Military formation of the North Atlantic Treaty Organization (NATO) responsible for providing deployable joint staff elements (DJSE) in support of NATO operations worldwide. It was headquartered at Campbell Barracks, Germany, and reported to the Joint Force Command Brunssum (JFCBS). During the War in Afghanistan, it provided command and control elements to the International Security Assistance Force (ISAF).

Starting as Central Army Group (CENTAG) in 1952, the force defending the central part of the western Europe border with the Warsaw Pact, the structure changed in response to the ending of the cold war and it was disbanded on 1 April 2013.

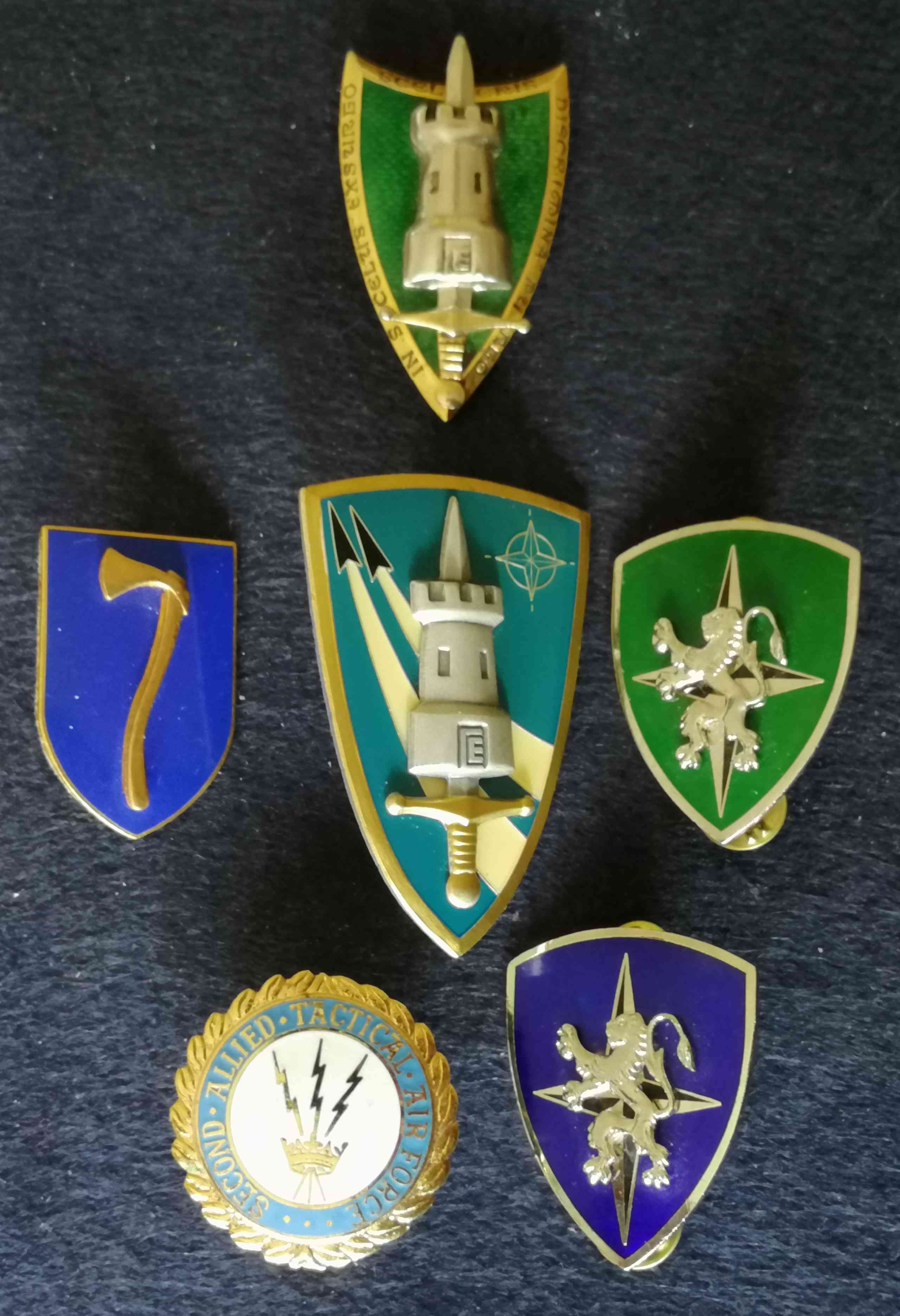
NATO Command AFCENT badges in the 1980s

== History ==
=== Cold War ===
Location during the Cold War

The Central Army Group (CENTAG) was established in 1952 and assigned to work with United States Army Europe at Campbell Barracks, Heidelberg, Germany. When the Bundeswehr was activated in 1955, some German personnel were assigned to the plans section of CENTAG.

In April 1959, the plans section of CENTAG became Headquarters, Central Army Group and was commanded by an American general. It remained at Campbell Barracks and was charged with defending southern Germany against any prospective Soviet attack. It consisted of the German II Corps, the German III Corps, the US V Corps, and the US VII Corps.

In August 1961, CENTAG was relocated to Hammonds Barracks, (formerly Loretto Kaserne) Mannheim-Seckenheim, Germany and remained there until December 1980 when NATO determined coordination was better when three headquarters were located on the same installation. CENTAG was returned to Campbell Barracks to be collocated with the Fourth Allied Tactical Air Force (4 ATAF) and the Allied Command Europe Mobile Force-Land (AMF(L)).

=== Allied Land Forces, Central Europe, 1993-2000 ===
Structural changes began in June 1993, when CENTAG and the Northern Army Group (NORTHAG), Mönchengladbach, Germany were deactivated and combined to form Allied Land Forces Central Europe (LANDCENT), which was activated in Heidelberg on 1 July 1993.

LANDCENT's mission was to:

- 1) contribute to the protection of peace and deterrence of aggression,
- 2) plan, prepare and direct operations of allocated land forces for the security and defence of his area of responsibility,
- 3) plan, coordinate, and conduct synchronized air/land operations in support of CINCENT's theater campaign, and
- 4) be prepared to conduct peace support operations

At the lower level, all strictly national corps in the central region were superseded, in wartime plans terms at least, by the mid 1990s. All NATO corps, except for the German IV Corps, were then multinational. In the mid-late 1990s there were four multinational main defence corps in NATO's Central Region: one Danish-German (LANDJUT), one Dutch-German (I. GE/NL Corps) and two German-United States (II GE/US and V US/GE). The two German-United States corps were strictly wartime command organisations.

Beginning in 1993, LANDCENT provided troops in the Former Republic of Yugoslavia. In 1995, LANDCENT provided troops for the Implementation Force (IFOR) and later served as the headquarters of the Stabilization Force (SFOR) in Bosnia-Herzegovina. When NATO acted in Kosovo in 1999, LANDCENT began operations in Pristina, Kosovo and Skopje, Republic of Macedonia and would serve as the headquarters for the Kosovo Force (KFOR).

Originally, LANDCENT command was to be rotated between German and Dutch generals. In 1996, The commander of US Army Europe (USAREUR) assumed an additional role as commander of LANDCENT with General William W. Crouch assuming command. The dual command of USAREUR and LANDCENT allowed the continued integration of American forces into NATO's post-Cold War structure. In addition, an agreement was made which set out the arrangements under which the European Corps (Eurocorps), consisting of units from Belgium, France, Germany, Luxembourg, and Spain, would be made available to NATO in times of crisis.

=== Twenty-first century ===
The departure from the Cold War era brought the implementation of a new NATO Military Command Structure and LANDCENT was formally designated as Joint Headquarters Centre (JHQ CENT) in a ceremony held in March 2000. The new structure, which accompanied this designation, included personnel from five additional nations: the Czech Republic, Hungary, Italy, Norway and Poland - making a total of 12 NATO Nations contributing to the Headquarters. In July 2004, JHQ CENT was once again reorganised and designated as Component Command-Land Headquarters, Heidelberg (CC-Land HQ HD).

In 2006, NATO recognised the need for a more flexible command and control structure. To augment the current operational level commands, NATO experimented with the use of Deployable Joint Staff Elements (DJSE). The DJSE allow Allied Joint Force Command Brunssum, Allied Joint Force Command Naples, and Allied Joint Force Command Lisbon to command multiple operations from their home headquarters. CC-Land HQ HD was chosen to test the concept, and was designated Force Command Heidelberg (HQ FC HD) in 2010. The first operation in which the DJSE played a role was commanding the International Security Assistance Force (ISAF), Afghanistan.

Headquarters Allied Force Command Heidelberg has been deactivated as part of NATO's transformation. The newly activated Allied Land Command (LANDCOM), located in Izmir, Turkey, has assumed responsibilities from Allied Force Command Heidelberg in Germany as well as Allied Force Command Madrid in Spain. The deactivation was finally completed on March 14, 2013.

== See also ==
- Central Army Group (1989) order of battle
- Timeline of events in the Cold War
