= World War II Behind Closed Doors: Stalin, the Nazis and the West =

2008 documentary television series

- DVD cover
- Genre: Educational
- Created by: Laurence Rees; Andrew Williams
- Based on: World War II; German-Soviet relations
- Narrated by: Samuel West (UK); Keith David (US)
- Country of origin: United Kingdom
- Original language: English
- No. of episodes: 6

Production
- Running time: 300 minutes
- Production companies: BBC; PBS

Original release
- Network: BBC
- Release: 10 November – 15 December 2008

World War II Behind Closed Doors: Stalin, the Nazis and the West is a 2008 six-episode BBC/PBS documentary series on the role of Joseph Stalin and German-Soviet relations before, during, and after World War II, created by Laurence Rees and Andrew Williams.

It carries new controversial material from the Soviet archives that became available to the public only after the end of the Soviet Union. Each episode lasts approximately one hour and features reenactments of the situations subject.

== Background ==
The 2008 series combines narrative-led documentary segments interwoven by dramatic re-enactments with actors representing main political figures of the period. The original narrative voice-over was performed by Samuel West, while Keith David, a veteran of Ken Burns's PBS series, narrates the American version. Joseph Stalin is portrayed by Alexei Petrenko, Winston Churchill, by Paul Humpoletz, and Franklin D. Roosevelt by Bob Gunton.

The series delves into such matters as the British, American, and Soviet cover-up of the Katyn Forest Massacre; Churchill's agreement at Yalta that Stalin should keep his gains of the Nazi-Soviet Pact, including Poland's prewar Kresy (eastern borderlands); the Polish population transfers (1944–1946); and the betrayal or persecution of figures such as Marshal Georgy Zhukov, Vyacheslav Molotov, and John H. Noble. The British historian Laurence Rees did the research compilation and the lead writing for the series, and the drama was directed by Andrew Williams.

== Cast ==
- Aleksei Petrenko as Joseph Stalin
- Bob Gunton as Franklin D. Roosevelt
- Paul Humpoletz as Winston Churchill
- Ziyad Abou Chair as Adolf Hitler
- Michael J. Reynolds as George C. Marshall
- Simon Thorp as Anthony Eden
- Valery Zhakov as Vyacheslav Molotov
- Krzysztof Dracz as Lavrentiy Beria
- Richard Alleman as Harry S. Truman

== Episodes ==
No.	Title	Original release date
1	"Unlikely Friends 1/2"	10 November 2008
Looks at the Nazi-Soviet Pact of 1939 after the Battle of Poland together with the planning and start of Operation Barbarossa, the German invasion of the Soviet Union of 1941.
2	"Unlikely Friends 2/2"	17 November 2008
Explores the relationship between the Soviet Union and Britain during the war, the Japanese attack on Pearl Harbor and plans for a Western Front in Europe.
3	"Cracks in the Alliance 1/2"	24 November 2008
Features the Moscow Conference between Stalin and Churchill and two battles on the Eastern Front: Stalingrad and Kursk.
4	"Cracks in the Alliance 2/2"	1 December 2008
Covers the Tehran Conference, the first between the "Big Three", D-Day in France and the Warsaw Uprising.
5	"Dividing the World 1/2"	8 December 2008
Details the Battle of Normandy, the Battle of the Bulge, the Yalta Conference, the push to Berlin, and the victory over Germany from the perspective of Allied nations.
6	"Dividing the World 2/2"	15 December 2008
Focuses on Operation August Storm, the end to the Pacific War, the Potsdam Conference, the fall from grace of Zhukov and Molotov, the death of Stalin, to the eventual fall of communist influence with the Berlin Wall in 1989.

== Companion book ==
Rees, Laurence (2008). World War II Behind Closed Doors: Stalin, the Nazis and the West. Barnes & Nobles Publishing. ISBN 978-0-307-37730-2.

== See also ==
- How Hitler Lost the War
- Hitler's Warriors
- Soviet Storm: World War II in the East
- World War II In HD Colour
