= John Barwick (disambiguation) =

John Barwick (1612–1664) was a royalist churchman.

John Barwick may also refer to:

- John Barwick (theologian) (fl. 1340), English theologian
- John Storey Barwick (1840–1915), English industrialist
- Sir John Storey Barwick, 2nd Baronet (1876–1953) of the Barwick baronets
