= Richard Barwick =

Richard Barwick may refer to:

- Richard Barwick (zoologist), husband of Diane Barwick
- Richard Barwick (1916–1979) of the Barwick baronets

== See also ==
- Barwick (surname)
