= Barwick =

Barwick may refer to:

== People ==
- Barwick (surname)
- The Barwick baronets, a titled family in England
- Daniel Barwick, an American author, fundraiser, journalist, podcaster, higher education administrator, and teacher.

== Placenames ==
- Barwick, Georgia, a town in Thomas County, Georgia, United States
- Barwick, Kentucky
- Barwick, Ontario, Canada
- Barwick, Devon, a village in Devon, England
- Barwick, Hertfordshire, a village in Hertfordshire, England
- Barwick, Norfolk, a hamlet and civil parish in Norfolk, England
- Barwick, Somerset, a village and civil parish in Somerset, England
- Barwick-in-Elmet, a village in West Yorkshire, England
- Barwick in Elmet and Scholes, a civil parish in West Yorkshire, England
- Ingleby Barwick, a suburb of Stockton-on-Tees, North Yorkshire, England

== Other uses ==
- "Barwick Green", the theme music to The Archers
- Barwick School, an independent preparatory school in Mashonaland Central, Zimbabwe
