= How Hitler Lost the War =

- Directed by: Robert Denny, David Hoffman
- Written by: Robert Denny
- Produced by: David Hoffman
- Starring: Adolf Galland, Johann von Kielmansegg
- Narrated by: Norman Rose
- Cinematography: Charles Boyd
- Music by: Bob Sakayama, Ed Van Fleet
- Production company: Varied Directions
- Release date: 1989
- Running time: 67 minutes
- Country: United States

How Hitler Lost the War is a 1989 World War II documentary created and produced by David Hoffman and Robert Denny, and narrated by Norman Rose.

== Overview ==
The documentary explores Hitler's upbringing and efforts during World War II and includes footage from this time period. It also contains interviews and statements from military historians and veterans, and looks into what mistakes Hitler made during the war and what he could have potentially done differently in order to win.

== Cast ==
- Norman Rose, Narrator
- Adolf Galland, German veteran
- Hans Adolf Jakobson, German historian
- Johannes Steinhoff, German veteran
- Johann von Kielmansegg, German veteran
- Jeffrey Page, American historian
- Christopher Foxley Norris, American historian
- Reginald Victor Jones, American historian
- Trevor Dupree, French historian
- Charles W. Sydnor Junior, German-American historian

== Reception ==
Critical reception for How Hitler Lost the War was mostly positive. Entertainment Weekly gave the movie a B− but commented that the film's thesis was "dubious". The Chicago Sun-Times praised the documentary and called it "a fascinating re-examination of the misdirection of one of the greatest war machines the world has ever known". In contrast, the New York Times stated that the film was "sporadically interesting but far from persuasive" and noted that it lacked a contrary analysis of the material. The Los Angeles Times criticized How Hitler Lost the War for containing several pieces of misinformation and for also never fully realizing its potential, as they felt that the final portion of the documentary was a "superficial rehash of how German designers made a jet plane and other advances toward the end of the war--not exactly hot news to anyone who's read the war's history."

== Re-Release ==
It has since been re-released onto DVD in 2012 (Region 1, NTSC), by Varied Directions.

== See also ==
- Hitler's Warriors
- Soviet Storm: World War II in the East
- World War II In HD Colour
