= Barwich =

Barwich is a surname. Notable people with the surname include:

- Ann-Sophie Barwich, cognitive scientist, empirical philosopher and historian of science
- Heinz Barwich (1911–1966), German nuclear physicist

== See also ==
- Barwick (surname)
