= Sigismund Neumann =

Sir Sigismund Neumann (Anglicized name Sigmund) (1857 – 1916) was a mining magnate (Randlord) and financier on the Witwatersrand.

== Early life and family ==
Neumann was born in Fürth, Kingdom of Bavaria, on 25 May 1857 to Jewish parents, Gustav and Babette Neumann. In his late teens, he emigrated to Cape Colony to seek his fortune in the Kimberley diamond mines. His brother Ludwig moved to London, where he worked with the financiers Leopold Hirsch & Co., who went into the market for mining shares, and made his way in society.

== First years on the Rand ==
Neumann began as a diamond buyer for the firm V.A. & E.M. Littkie, but then moved to the Barberton gold fields and founded his own company S. Neumann & Co. when gold was discovered in the Witwatersrand. His staff in Johannesburg included Charles Sydney Goldman, who had moved from agriculture into the mining industry. He became a partner in 1895. Carl Hanau from Freiburg im Breisgau worked on futures contracts. He was made a partner, but moved on to Barnato Bros. Another partner who played a major part in the company was Henry James King, an American. He was one of the diamond syndicate who bought up the output supplied by De Beers.

Others employed by Neumann were Henry Hames Friedlander, a member of the Johannesburg Reform Committee, and William Daw, who in 1915 became chairman of the Chamber of Mines. The group became aware of the potential of deep shaft mining.

S. Neumann & Co. grew quickly. Neumann has been classified as a "fringe operator" or share promoter, but by 1895 he was also a major player in the mines market, directly or through others controlling directorships in 37 companies. The company was established as one of the "big ten" mining companies on the Rand. It controlled the New Modderfontein, Witwatersrand Deep, and Cloverfield mines, and owned a stake in Randfontein Deep and West Rand Consolidated.

== After the Second Boer War ==
In the years immediately following the Second Anglo-Boer War, Neumann's company expanded further. It bought into several coal mines in the Transvaal, as well as undertaking further large-scale gold mining. In 1903 Neumann started to bypass the diamond syndicate, with a supply of diamonds from the Transvaal. An article by J. A. Hobson in The Speaker, "The Structure of South African Finance", of April 1905, placed Neumann at this period in the Randlord political and financial "inner ring", with Alfred Beit, Leander Starr Jameson, James Rochfort Maguire, the banker Lewis Loyd Michell and Julius Wernher.

In London, Neumann established in 1907 a commercial bank Neumann, Luebeck, & Co., in partnership with Martin Lübeck, former manager of the Dresdner Bank branch there. The City of London was, at least privately, not impressed: Kleinworts in 1909 for Goldman Sachs was advising against the bank's acceptances, on the basis of Neumann's track record of share promotion. The new firm was responsible for financing some new South African mining companies. Neumann also became a director of the African Banking Corporation and the London Joint Stock Bank.

== Later life ==
Neumann concentrated on his interests in London, and he became a naturalised British citizen. In 1910, he visited South Africa for the last time, after which he resigned his managing directorship from his remaining Transvaal businesses. By 1912, most of his financial interests in South Africa had been taken over by other companies.

In London, the Randlords mostly settled in the West End neighbourhoods of Mayfair and Belgravia, constantly vying with each other. Neumann retired to live in a large mansion at 146 Piccadilly. It was part of the French Embassy of the 1780s, from the time of Jean-Balthazar d'Adhémar, later divided between John Craufurd (No. 146) and Charles Cockerell (No. 147). This area of the north side of Piccadilly, near its junction with Park Lane, was nicknamed "Rothschild Row": in the late 1890s: Alice Charlotte von Rothschild lived at No. 142, and Ferdinand de Rothschild next door at No. 143; and Nathan Rothschild, 1st Baron Rothschild owned No. 148, which had had No. 147 incorporated into it during the 1860s. (The buildings once there stood on the site of what is now the InterContinental London Park Lane.) The leasehold of No. 146 was sold by Charles Day Rose, in 1895, and it was bought by Neumann. No. 145 belonged to Hamar Bass, who left it in 1898 to his son Sir William Bass, 2nd Baronet.

Neumann was received by King Edward VII. He rented Invercauld House in Aberdeenshire; it is 2 kilometres (1.2 mi) from Balmoral Castle. Frederick Ponsonby recorded an unsuccessful shooting party there organised by Neumann for the King. George Cornwallis-West in his memoirs gave a deer stalking anecdote, set above Braemar, from a time when he was Neumann's guest. A head of a deer shot by Neumann while at Invercauld in 1899 was exhibited in Glasgow and London. In 1907 the King visited the Neumanns at Glenmuick, and played croquet.

A member of the Berkeley Synagogue, Neumann became involved in horse racing. He also owned a second home in Newmarket, Suffolk, Cecil Lodge. From 1908 the family rented Raynham Hall in north Norfolk from the Townshend family, through Redvers Buller who managed the estate. The King was invited for a day's shooting there over Christmas of that year. Neumann's nephew Daniel-Henry Kahnweiler disliked both the Piccadilly house—a "huge hotel-like mansion"—and the Neumanns' lifestyle. They may have been in the social circle of Edward VII, but Anna's pretensions were snubbed by his mistress Alice Keppel ("Dear Anna, may I call you Lady Neumann?"). The general question as to whether the "incomer" London banks and bankers succeeded in entering and supplanting the "aristocratic" banking traditions of the City of London, at this period when the social barriers were fairly low, has become an academic debate.

== Death and aftermath ==
Sir Sigismund Neumann, 1st Baronet, died aged 59 at "Remuera", Denton Road, Eastbourne, Sussex on 13 September 1916 and is buried with his wife Anna in a family vault on the east side of Highgate Cemetery. After his death, his remaining mining holdings were taken over by the Central Mining & Investment Corporation, formed from the interests of Beit, Wernher and Hermann Ludwig Eckstein.

== Legacy ==
The Witbank Colliery in time became one of the world's largest coal mines, producing around 40 million tons a year in the early 1970s, almost two-thirds of the South Africa's entire yield.

== Family ==
Neumann married Anna Allegra (1864 – 1951), daughter of Jacques Hakim of Alexandria in 1890, in Vevey, Switzerland. They had two sons and three daughters, all born in England:

- Cecil Gustavus Jacques (9 June 1891 – May 1955) who succeeded him as baronet of Cecil Lodge, married Joan F M Grimston in 1922 at St. Albans, Hertfordshire
- Sybil Rose Muriel Edith (born Apr – Jun 1895), married Victor M. Wombwell in February 1920 at St George, Hanover Square; his original surname was Graham-Menzies. He was heavily in debt at the time of the marriage, and it broke down later in the year, as he travelled to India to serve as a soldier. The marriage was annulled in 1921. Sybil married again, in 1923, to Robert Grimston, brother of Cecil's wife Joan.
- Rosie Violet Nina Millicent (born 25 July 1896 – 1988), unmarried.
- Ella Julie (born 1 March 1899 – 15 February 1925), unmarried.
- Guy Arthur (born 24 March 1904 – 1982), married Jean S. Loch in 1930 at Risbridge, Suffolk

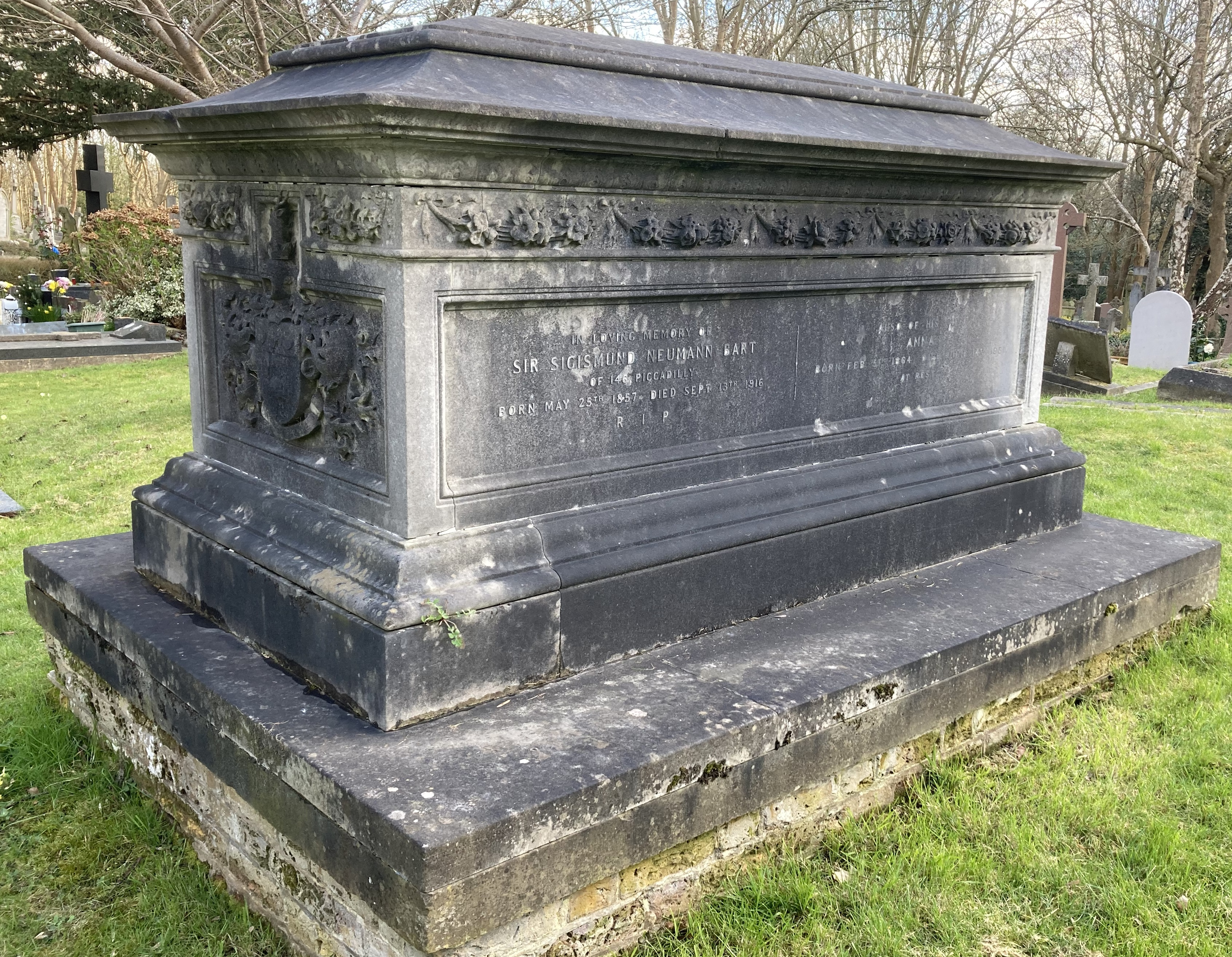
Family vault of Sir Sigismund Neumann in Highgate Cemetery

== Sources ==
- (af) Krüger, Prof. D.W. and Beyers, C.J. (chief ed.). Suid-Afrikaanse Biografiese Woordeboek, vol. III. Cape Town: Tafelberg-Uitgewers, 1977.
