= Barwick (surname) =

Barwick is a surname. Notable people with the surname include:

- Bill Barwick (1946–2017), American Western music singer-songwriter and voice-over artist
- Brian Barwick (born 1954), English sports official
- Daniel Barwick (born 1968), American college president
- Diane Barwick (1938–1986), Canadian-born anthropologist, researcher and teacher
- Doug Barwick (born 1962), Australian rules footballer
- Garfield Barwick (1903–1997), Chief Justice of the High Court of Australia
- Greg Barwick (born 1968), Australian rugby league player
- John Barwick (theologian) (fl. 1340), Anglo-Scots theologian
- John Barwick (1612–1664), English royalist churchman and Dean of St. Paul's Cathedral
- Julianna Barwick, American musician
- Mia Barwick (born 2010), Australian cricketer
- Paul Barwick (born 1946), American LGBT rights activist and same-sex marriage pioneer
- Peter Barwick (1619–1705), English physician and author
- Sandy Barwick (born 1949), New Zealand female ultramarathon runner
- Steve Barwick (born 1960), Welsh cricketer
- Terry Barwick (born 1983), English football player
- Tony Barwick (1934–1993), British television scriptwriter
- Vic Barwick (1879–1963), Australian rules footballer
