= Soviet Storm: World War II in the East =

Russian TV series (2011)

- Великая война
- Genre: Educational
- Created by: Anna Grazhdan
- Based on: World War II
- Written by: Artem Drabkin; Aleksey Isaev
- Directed by: Anna Grazhdan
- Narrated by: David Riley; Mike Cooper
- Composer: Boris Kukoba
- Country of origin: Russia
- Original language: Russian
- No. of seasons: 2
- No. of episodes: 18

Production
- Producers: Valery Babich; Vlad Rianshyn; Sergey Titinkov; Konstantin Ernst
- Production location: Russia
- Editor: Liudmila Berazhnaya
- Running time: Approximately 12 hours
- Production company: MMX Star Media Pro

Original release
- Network: Channel One Russia OJSC
- Release: 2011

Soviet Storm: World War II in the East (Russian: Великая война, lit. 'The Great War') is a 2011 17-episode Russian television World War II series created by Anna Grazhdan, Artem Drabkin, and Aleksey Isaev. An online version includes 18 episodes, ordered chronologically.

The series consists of two seasons, which document and recount the most important, bloody, costly, and decisive events, battles, and personalities on the Eastern Front in World War II. Episodes generally last between 40 and 45 minutes and the overall series lasts approximately 12 hours.

== Series 1 ==
No. in series	Title
1	"Operation Barbarossa"
The Battle of Britain is over. The Luftwaffe has been driven to exhaustion, and Germany suffers its first major defeat. Even though Britain remains undefeated, it is so isolated that Hitler has no concerns about turning his attention East. Operation Barbarossa, the German invasion of the USSR, takes the Soviets completely by surprise and the Red Army suffers terrible casualties.
2	"The Battle of Moscow"
October 1941, Germany's Army Group Center is only some 25 km west of Moscow. The Russian winter, however, is only a few weeks away. With not enough soldiers or military equipment, the Soviet high command's only hope left is that the weather will save the capital. The battle ends in a bloody failure for the German Army, and it is forced to retreat.
3	"The Siege of Leningrad"
Leningrad, a vital and large Baltic Sea port, is facing the entire weight of Army Group North. The Soviets have no reserves to spare as the Battle of Moscow is about to begin. Wilhelm von Leeb's Army Group North fails to take Leningrad, but begins a horrible siege that will last 872 days, in which over a million civilians will die of starvation and disease.
4	"Stalingrad"
After the failure to take both Moscow and Leningrad, Hitler sets his sights on the oil fields in the Caucasus. If captured, the Red Army will lose 70–90% of all its oil resources. Therefore, the famous city on the Volga, Stalingrad, must be "held at all costs." The German General Staff thinks taking the city will be a matter of a few weeks, but events steadily turn against the Germans. It will be one of the most costly, famous, and decisive battles of the Second World War.
5	"Operation Bagration"
By summer 1944, Germany has undeniably lost the battle of the USSR. After the Soviet victories at Moscow, Stalingrad, Kursk, and Leningrad, the Soviet Union, with its practically unlimited resources of manpower and matériel, begins to rapidly push the Germans back toward the German border. On 22 June 1944, Stalin launches Operation Bagration, named after a Russian hero of the Napoleonic Wars. Germany, by now, is running out of manpower, resources, and even faith in their charismatic Führer.
6	"The Battle of Ukraine"
Kiev, the Ukrainian capital, is, after a lengthy battle, back in Soviet hands. But now they have to clear the Germans and German allies out of the Crimea and liberate the rest of Western Ukraine. Hitler declared the Crimea a "Festung," meaning it should be held at all cost and to the last man. The German 17th Army was effectively destroyed in the process.
7	"The Battle of Berlin"
Germany has without question lost World War II in Europe, but Hitler, by now a heavily medicated and deluded character, refuses to give up hope; he orders the roughly one million German soldiers left in the ruined city to defend Berlin, now a strange mix of combat veterans, teenage boys from the Hitler Youth, and old men from the People's Army. Finally admitting all is lost, Hitler, his girlfriend, and many of those present with him commit suicide to avoid captivity.

== Series 2 ==
No. in series	Title
1	"The Battle of Kiev"
After the swift success at Smolensk, Hitler has diverted the bulk of Heinz Guderian's panzers down to the South, so as to capture the Ukrainian capital Kiev, considered more important than Moscow in Hitler's mind. It begins a gigantic clash and turns out to be the biggest military encirclement in history. Despite heroic and long resistance, approximately six hundred and fifty thousand Soviet soldiers face captivity or death.
2	"The Defence of Sevastopol"
Erich von Manstein's soldiers have trapped a massive Soviet force in Crimea, but the doomed troops have no intentions of surrendering, strongly motivated by patriotism. Manstein assembles the greatest concentration of artillery in history, which includes the world's biggest railway-gun nicknamed "Dora," and for eight months Soviets troops are savagely bombarded; destroying Sevastopol's only harbor. Realizing the battle is hopelessly lost, the Soviet forces finally surrender.
3	"The Rzhev "Meat-Grinder"
The capture of Rzhev, the city that connects all railroads in Western Russia, is imperative. It will cost the lives of some 3 million Soviet soldiers and 500 000 German soldiers. It will take the Soviets a total of 3 years to throw the Germans firmly out of the city. These bloodbaths will become known by the veterans and historians as "The Rzhev Meat-Grinder".
4	"The Battle of the Caucasus"
Ewald von Kleist has broken through to the Terek river, slap in front of the vital oil fields of Grozny and Baku. Only freezing temperatures in the Caucasus prevent von Kleist's 1st Panzer Army from breaking through to Ozoni Kizi and Tbilisi. The Soviets launch a desperate counter-attack that holds the Germans back. After the winter, Hitler makes a series of strategic blunders with von Kleist's forces, and he is forced to withdraw all his troops in the Caucasus to the Kuban bridge-head.
5	"The War at Sea"
Hours before the start of Operation Barbarossa, the Germans, along with their Finnish allies, begin mining the Gulf of Finland to prevent any naval evacuation of Soviet troops and ships. When Operation Barbarossa begins, Axis U-boats begin pounding the grand Soviet Navy, primarily based at Leningrad. This turns out to be the start of a five year sea war against the Soviet Union's Baltic Navy and the German and Finnish navies.
6	"The Air War"
On 22 June 1941, German pilots were the first to see the sun rise. Before the day was over, the Soviet Air Forces had lost almost 2 000 aircraft. The early German air superiority gave a significant boost to German confidence, and severely damaged Soviet military capability and morale. The air wars over the USSR between the Soviet Union and Germany would be some of the biggest and toughest in military history.
7	"The Partisan War"
By 1943-1944, as the Germans are desperately struggling to hold their ground, they are increasingly hindered by the Soviet partisans, which contain many former Red Army soldiers that had been cut off behind enemy lines. The Germans responded with intensive counter-insurgency campaigns and brutal reprisals against the civilian population. The Germans will, because of this, fight a war against both the Soviet army and the Soviet population.
8	"The Secret War"
Shortly before the outbreak of the Second World War, the Polish and British have succeeded in de-coding the top secret German military codes known as "Enigma." This information, referred to as "Ultra" by the Allies, becomes vital for the Allies' military situation in North Africa, the Soviet Union, and Northern France. To the end of the war, the Germans were unaware that their top secret codes were being read, often in real-time, in London.
9	"The Battle for Germany"
Germany is retreating on all fronts and suffering defeat after defeat. The breach of Germany's pre-War borders now seems inevitable. Desperate, Hitler orders all males between the ages of 16 and 70 to enlist and fight for the fatherland. Nazi ideologues put faith in victory and the Nazis seem to vanquish and suppress all forms of doubt and resistance in the last months of the Reich.
10	"The War Against Japan"
The war in Europe is over. However, in the Pacific East, the United States is still fighting the Japanese, who consider surrender the greatest humiliation for a soldier. Stalin promises to help Roosevelt, but the dropping of the Atomic bomb on Japan suddenly alters the calculus for the Allies. Despite the devastation, the Japanese military vows to fight on. When reports of massive defeats in Manchuria at the hands of the Soviets reach the Japanese high-command, though, the military quickly capitulates. Even after the Japanese surrender, the Soviets use subtle diplomatic language to justify the continued capture of Japanese territory.

An online version adds an 18th episode, "The Battle of Kursk", and reorders the episodes more chronologically:

Online no.	Original no.	Title
1	1.01	"Operation Barbarossa"
2	2.01	"The Battle of Kiev"
3	2.02	"The Defence of Sevastopol"
4	1.02	"The Battle of Moscow"
5	1.03	"The Siege of Leningrad"
6	2.03	"The Rzhev "Meat-Grinder"
7	1.04	"Stalingrad"
8	2.04	"The Battle of the Caucasus"
9	-	"The Battle of Kursk"
10	1.06	"The Battle of Ukraine"
11	1.05	"Operation Bagration"
12	2.06	"The Air War"
13	2.05	"War at Sea"
14	2.07	"The Partisan War"
15	2.08	"The Secret War"
16	2.09	"The Battle for Germany"
17	1.07	"Battle of Berlin"
18	2.10	"War Against Japan"

== See also ==
- How Hitler Lost the War
- Hitler's Warriors
- World War II In HD Colour
