= Guido Knopp =

German journalist and author (born 1948)

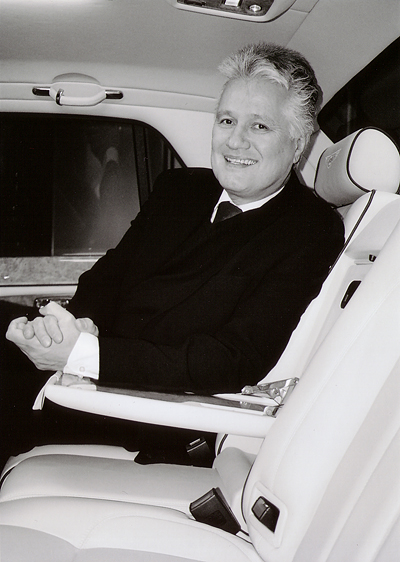
Guido Knopp

Guido Knopp (born 29 January 1948 in Treysa, Hessen) is a German journalist and author. He is well known in Germany, mainly because he has produced a great number of TV documentaries, predominantly about the "Third Reich" and National Socialism, but also about other topics, such as Stalinism.

== Life and work ==
After earning his doctoral degree in history and political science, Knopp worked as a newspaper editor at the Welt am Sonntag and the Frankfurter Allgemeine Zeitung. In 1978 he took up employment at the German TV station ZDF. Since then, he has produced many documentaries about the Nazi dictatorship like Hitlers Helfer ("Hitler's Henchmen"), Hitler-Eine Bilanz ("Hitler-taking stock") or Die SS: Eine Warnung der Geschichte ("The SS: A warning from history"), but also, for example, Vatikan (about the power of the popes) or Kanzler: Die Mächtigen der Republik (about Germany's post-war federal chancellors). Knopp hosts a weekly German television program, usually broadcast on Sundays, called History. In 1999, he produced a series called 100 Jahre – der Countdown, which sums up the whole 20th century, year by year, and is still sometimes broadcast during holidays by the Phoenix television station. For the publication of his book Top Spies – Traitors in the Secret War (1994), Knopp worked with the German Federal Intelligence Service and several retired spies to present their personal story and explain their work to a broad public.

Knopp's history films are often criticised for presenting the Third Reich too superficially and for "editing history" to play down the role of the German public in building and supporting Hitler's regime. He was condemned for rewriting history by leaving out the role of the Wehrmacht (former German Army) in the cruelties of World War II. In 2004, a group of international historians warned that documentaries like the ones produced by Knopp could reduce important historic facts to mere infotainment. The idea that German dictator Adolf Hitler attended the funeral of Kurt Eisner and supported the Bavarian Soviet Republic originates with Knopp Sjoerd J. de Boer described this as a myth.

In 2003, Knopp pleaded for Konrad Adenauer to be featured in the Unsere Besten list of greatest Germans, compiled by ZDF-TV. In 2004, he received the Goldene Kamera and the Bavarian and European TV award for his work. He teaches journalism at the Gustav-Siewerth-Akademie in Weilheim-Bierbronnen (Baden-Württemberg) and lives in Mainz. His publishing house is the German Random House group (Bertelsmann group). In 2008 Knopp worked on a movie about failed Hitler assassin Berthold Schenk Graf von Stauffenberg.

== Published books ==
- (1998) Hitler's Henchmen. Sutton Publishing. ISBN 0-7509-3781-5
- (2001) Hitler's Holocaust. Sutton Publishing. ISBN 0-7509-2700-3
- (2002) Hitler's Hitmen. Sutton Publishing. ISBN 0-7509-2602-3
- (2002) Hitler's Children. ISBN 0-7509-2732-1
- (2003) Hitler's Women. Routledge. ISBN 0-415-94730-8
- (2007) Die Wehrmacht: Eine Bilanz. C. Bertelsmann Verlag. ISBN 978-3-570-00975-8
- (2008) Hitler's Warriors. The History Press. ISBN 978-0-750-9260-1-0.
- (2002) In German Die SS: Eine Warnung der Geschichte. ("The SS: A historical warning") ISBN 3-570-00621-2, In Swedish SS - ondskans redskap ("SS - the tool of evil") ISBN 9789185377244
- (2007) In German Göring – Eine Karriere ("Göring - A career") ISBN 3-570-00891-6

== See also ==
- List of Adolf Hitler books
