= Nelson baronets of Acton Park (1912) =

Escutcheon of the Nelson baronets of Acton Park

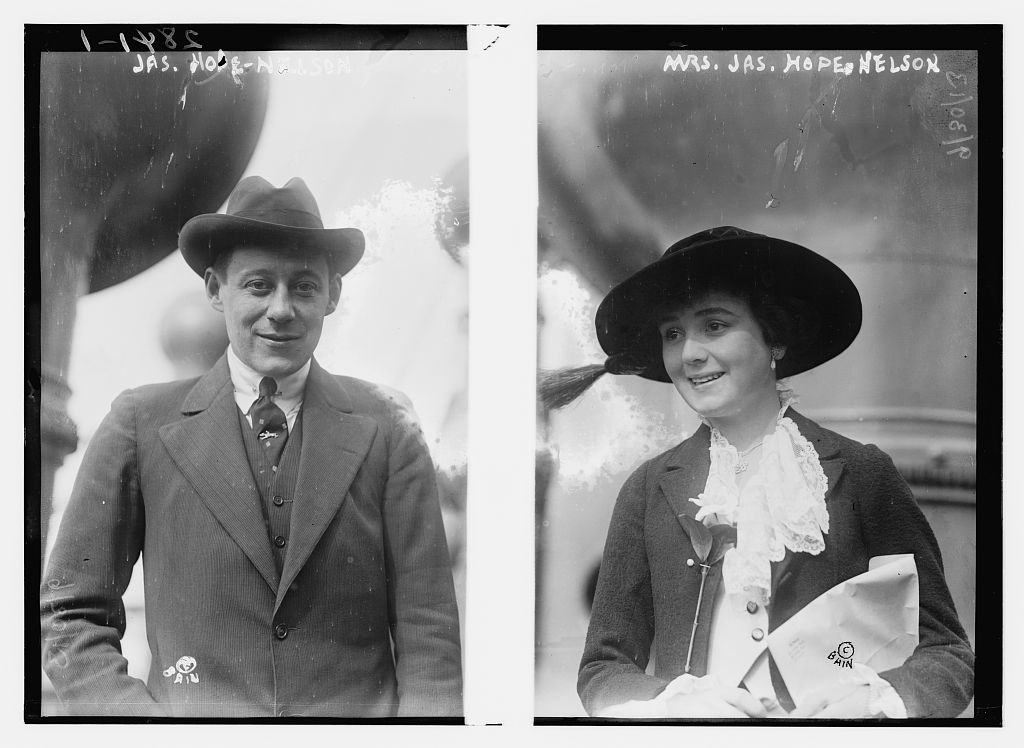
Sir James Hope Nelson, 2nd Baronet (1883–1960) and his wife circa 1913

The Nelson baronetcy, of Acton Park in Acton in the County of Denbigh, was created in the Baronetage of the United Kingdom on 5 February 1912 for William Nelson. He was Chairman of Nelson Line Ltd, of Liverpool, and of the Nelson Steam Navigation Company.

== Nelson baronets, of Acton Park (1912) ==
- Sir William Nelson, 1st Baronet (1851–1921)
- Sir James Hope Nelson, 2nd Baronet (1883–1960) who married Mary Isabel Valle in 1913 (divorced 1921). She was the daughter of Dr. Jules Felix Vallee (born 1859) and Mary A. Clover, of St. Louis, Missouri.
- Sir William Vernon Hope Nelson, 3rd Baronet (1914–1991)
- Sir Jamie Charles Vernon Hope, 4th Baronet (1949–2023)
- Sir Dominic William Michael Nelson, 5th Baronet (born 1957)

The heir apparent is the present holder's son Barnaby John Nelson (born 1982).

== Notes ==
Baronetage of the United Kingdom
Preceded by Murphy baronets	Nelson baronets of Acton Park; 5 February 1912	Succeeded by Neumann baronets
