= Andrew Williams (novelist) =

British writer and former television journalist

- Born: 8 May 1962 (age 64); Sheffield, England
- Education: Trinity College, Oxford
- Occupation: Author
- Writing career
- Genre: Fiction
- Subject: History
- Trinity College, Oxford
- Website: www.andrewwilliams.tv

Andrew Williams (born 8 May 1962) is a British writer and former television journalist. He is a former Senior Producer and Director at the BBC, the author of six historical novels and two histories of the Second World War.

== Early life ==
Andrew Williams was born on 8 May 1962 in Sheffield. He was educated at Carre's Grammar School, Sleaford and Trinity College, Oxford and was a member of its University Challenge team in 1983. He trained with Westminster Press and worked as a reporter with The Kentish Times newspaper group in south London.

== Career ==
Williams joined the BBC as a News Trainee in 1986 and worked as a Producer on Newsnight. In 1992, he directed and produced the documentary A Journey Home with the model, Iman, on the famine and civil war in her native Somalia. Then in 1993 he joined Panorama as an assistant editor, reporting on the domestic and international stories of the day. His programme with Reporter, Jane Corbin, on the 1995 massacre at Srebrenica, War Crime: Five Days in Hell, was used as evidence at the International War Crimes Tribunal in The Hague, and nominated for an Emmy Award.

In 1997, Williams directed and produced a ground breaking television series with Reporter, Peter Taylor, on the history of the Provisional IRA and Sinn Féin, Provos. He then joined BBC documentaries to write and direct programmes for Timewatch and Reputations. His documentary, Journey to the Killing Fields, included an interview with Pol Pot's deputy, Nuon Chea before his arrest on war crimes charges. The programme was nominated for a Grierson Award. His television history of the struggle against the German U-boat during World War II, The Battle of the Atlantic won the Mountbatten Maritime Prize and A New York Film and Television Festival Award, and was nominated for a Royal Television Society Award, and he wrote a best selling companion book to the series. In 2004, he produced and wrote the series, D-Day to Berlin and the accompanying book; and in 2008 he directed a six-part drama documentary series about Stalin, World War II: Behind Closed Doors.

Williams' first historical novel, The Interrogator was published by John Murray in 2009, and was shortlisted for both the Crime Writers Association (CWA) Ian Fleming Steel Dagger, and the Ellis Peters Historical Award. His second, To Kill A Tsar was shortlisted for the Ellis Peters Historical Award and the Walter Scott Prize for Historical Fiction. His 2019 novel, Witchfinder was set inside the British intelligence services in the years following the defection of Kim Philby in 1963, and tells the story of spy catcher, Peter Wright's misguided attempt to prove the existence of a master spy at the top of MI5 and to purge 'the Establishment' of those he suspected of communist sympathies. Based on real events, The Prime Minister's Affair is the story of an attempt to blackmail Labour's first Prime Minister, Ramsay MacDonald, and of a conspiracy to bring down his government.

== Personal life ==
He is married to Kate Mavor, the Master of St Cross College, Oxford University.

== Published works ==
History

- Williams, Andrew (2001). The Battle of the Atlantic, BBC Books. ISBN 978-0563534297
- Williams, Andrew (2004). D-Day to Berlin, Hodder & Stoughton. ISBN 978-0340833964

Historical novels

- Williams, Andrew (2009). The Interrogator. John Murray. ISBN 978-0719523618
- Williams, Andrew (2010). To Kill A Tsar. John Murray. ISBN 978-0719524011
- Williams, Andrew (2012). The Poison Tide. John Murray. ISBN 978-1848545816
- Williams, Andrew (2014). "The Suicide Club". Hodder & Stoughton. ISBN 978-1848545854
- Williams, Andrew (2019). "Witchfinder". Hodder & Stoughton. ISBN 978-1473631755
- Williams, Andrew (2022). "The Prime Minister's Affair". Hodder & Stoughton. ISBN 978-1529368260
