= Sir Ralph Forster, 1st Baronet =

Sir Ralph Collingwood Forster, 1st Baronet (1850–1930) was an English merchant, a director of Bessler, Waechter & Co. and other companies, and philanthropist. His baronetcy granted in 1912 recognised donations to University College, London, as a major benefactor of new chemistry laboratories.

== Early life ==
He was born at Chillingham, Northumberland, his birth being registered at Glendale as Ralph Collingwood Young. By age 21 he had command of French and German, and was a businessman in Newcastle upon Tyne; he had entered the merchants and exporters Bessler, Waechter & Co. as a boy, and became their Newcastle manager. By 1893, when the Newcastle business was dissolved, Forster was a partner in the company.

== Russian oil ==
Bessler, Waechter & Co. traded in coal and metals with St Petersburg. From 1888 they were the British agents for oil from the Nobel Brothers, who were exploiting Russian oilfields. For a few years from 1893 the company had a monopoly on Russian oil exports to the United Kingdom; the year 1897 saw the founding of the rival Anglo-Caucasian Petroleum Co., and then in 1900 the Consolidated Petroleum Co. The latter, in which Bessler, Waechter & Co. had a near 30% share, was a cartel. Forster, and Max and Harry Waechter, were directors. Forster acted as managing director, but in 1902 sold his shares to the Nobels, as did Waechter. The two businesses Bessler, Waechter and Anglo-Caucasian were effectively merged at this period, and prospered in the British kerosene market, until a disintermediation in 1904.

== Later life ==
Forster was High Sheriff of Surrey in 1906. Denis Gratwicke Halsted, the family doctor in Sutton, described Forster as an "oil millionaire" and "a big, heavy man with a florid complexion and a genial manner." He died leaving property valued at over £900,000, his residual estate being placed in a trust for his three surviving daughters and their offspring.

== Forster baronets, of The Grange (1912) ==
The Forster baronetcy of The Grange, Sutton, Surrey was created in the Baronetage of the United Kingdom on 2 February 1912 for Ralph Forster. The title became extinct on his death in 1930.

== Family ==
Forster was twice married. He married, firstly in 1874, Catherine (Kate) McKechnie (died 1877), one of two daughters of Colin Campbell McKechnie, a Primitive Methodist minister in Darlington. Both daughters married at this period, and then succumbed to illness. He married, secondly in 1880, Elizabeth (Lizzie) Burnip (died 1906), eldest daughter of John Burnip of Newcastle, at Gateshead Congregational Church, by the Rev. David Robb.

He left no male heir. His two sons were:

- Stanley Collingwood Forster (1881–1893), died at age 12.
- Hugh Murray Forster (1883–1915): Dr. Halsted wrote:

Hugh Forster died from abdominal wounds received on the Western Front in one of those senseless bouts of carnage in which the General Staff were wont to try out those 'two-day schemes' which Hugh, for all his nobility and patriotism, could not refrain from mildly criticizing.

He was a major in the King's Own Scottish Borderers, and died in the Battle of Loos.

The daughters included:

- Eva (b. 1889), married in 1917 Major Francis Rowley Hill, son of Col. Peter Edward Hill RA CB (1834–1919) and his wife Emily Mary Clarke.
- Ruth (b. 1891), married in 1920 Capt. Andreas Johannes Floor, of 15 Waldegrave Park, Twickenham, and had issue. Her husband, a Norwegian shipping broker, was naturalised as a British citizen in 1923.
- Hilda (1893–1976), married in 1927 James Forbes-Robertson VC, and had issue.

== Notes ==
Baronetage of the United Kingdom
Preceded by Barwick baronets	Forster baronets of The Grange; 2 February 1912	Succeeded by Murphy baronets
