= Murphy baronets of Wyckham (1912) =

Escutcheon of the Murphy baronets of Wyckham

The Murphy baronetcy, of Wyckham in the parish of Taney in the County of Dublin, was created in the Baronetage of the United Kingdom on 3 February 1912 for Michael Murphy, head of the shipping company Michael Murphy Ltd. The title became extinct on the death of the 2nd Baronet in 1963.

== Murphy baronets, of Wyckham (1912) ==
- Sir Michael Murphy, 1st Baronet (1845–1925)
- Sir George Francis Murphy, 2nd Baronet (1881–1963), died leaving no heir.

== Notes ==
Baronetage of the United Kingdom
Preceded by Forster baronets	Murphy baronets of Wyckham; 3 February 1912	Succeeded by Nelson baronets
