= Josef Moll =

German military officer

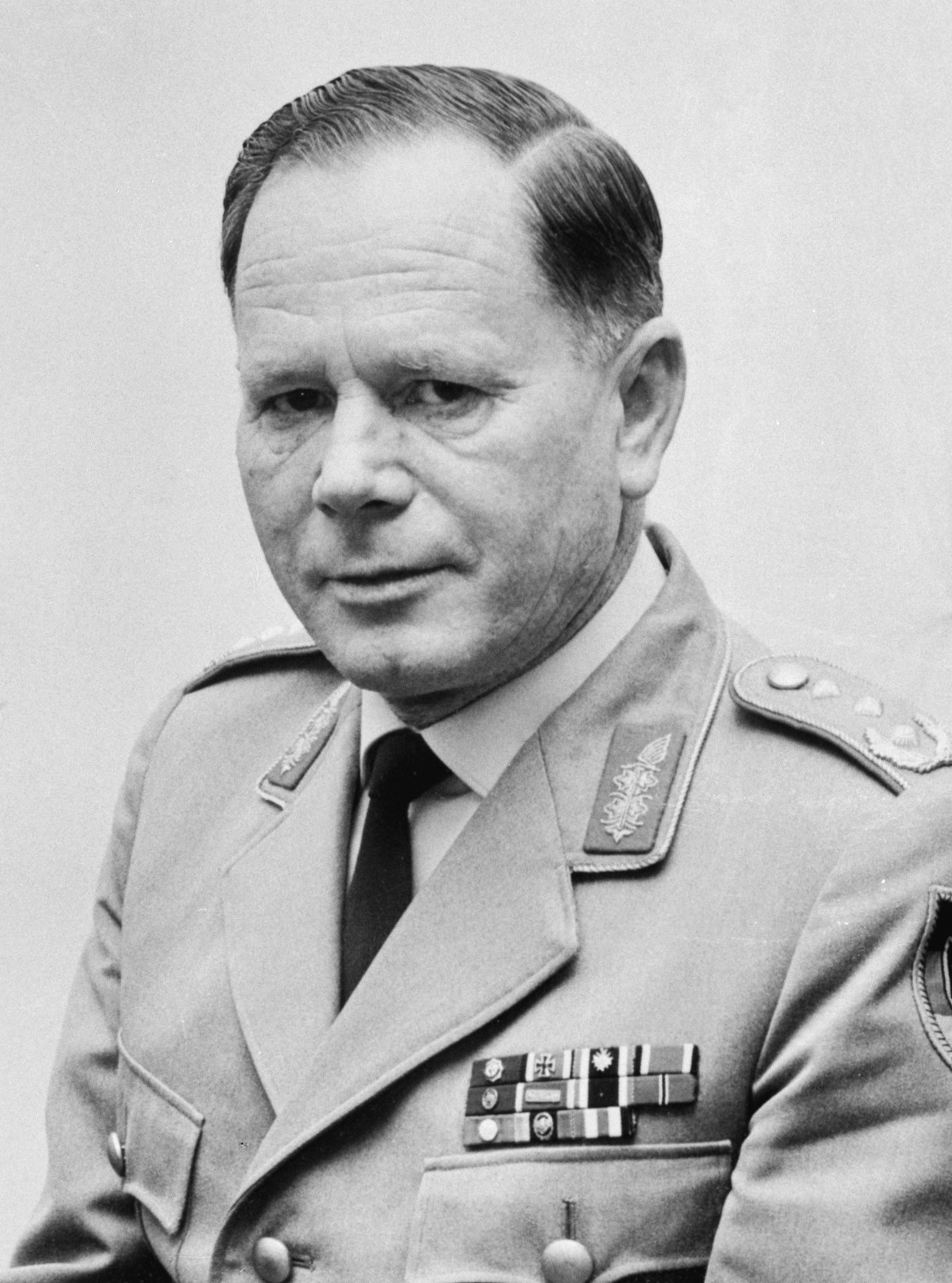
- Born: 5 September 1908; Laupertshausen, Württemberg, German Empire
- Died: 7 January 1989 (aged 80); Stuttgart, Baden-Württemberg, Germany
- Military career
- Allegiance: Nazi Germany (to 1945); West Germany
- Branch: Army (Wehrmacht); Army (Bundeswehr)
- Service years: 1935–1945; 1957–1968
- Rank: Oberstleutnant (Wehrmacht); Generalleutnant (Bundeswehr)
- Commands: 10th Panzer Division
- Awards: Grand Cross of Merit with Star

Lieutenant-General Josef Moll (5 September 1908 – 7 January 1989) was an officer of the German Army in the Wehrmacht and Bundeswehr who served from 1966 to 1968 as Inspector of the Army.

== Early life ==
Moll was born on 5 September 1908 in Laupertshausen in the Kingdom of Württemberg (today in Landkreis Biberach, Baden-Württemberg). He took his Abitur in 1926, and entered the state police of Württemberg, and in 1933 became a police lieutenant.

== Military career ==
=== Wehrmacht ===
On the formation of the Wehrmacht in 1935 following the takeover of power by the Nazi Party, Moll volunteered to serve as a first lieutenant (Oberleutnant) in the Army. He was assigned to Infantry Regiment 15, in which he served as a regimental adjutant and company commander. In 1940, Moll graduated from a higher military academy and promoted to captain (Hauptmann), and in 1941 he was appointed the second staff officer (supply) of the 20th Panzer Division.

In 1942, was promoted to major and assigned as the second staff officer of the 3rd Panzer Army on the Eastern Front, under Georg-Hans Reinhardt. This was followed by a transfer to XIV Panzer Corps, where Moll was the first general staff officer (chief of staff). He was then assigned to Army Group Africa as the third general staff officer, in charge of the enemy situation, a post which he continued to hold as the remnants of Army Group Africa were re-formed as Army Group B and then XIV Panzer Corps in Italy.

In 1944 Moll was promoted to lieutenant colonel (Oberstleutnant) and took the post of first staff officer for the 29th Panzer Grenadier Division, also in Italy. He was in that post when his unit surrendered with the rest of Army Group C in May 1945, and he was held as a prisoner of war by the American military until 1946.

=== Bundeswehr ===
In 1957 Moll joined the Army of the newly created Bundeswehr as a colonel (Oberst). He was promoted to brigadier general in 1959, and appointed deputy chief and chief of staff of the Truppenamt (today's Heeresamt). From 1961 to 1963 he was in the personnel department of the Federal Ministry of Defense in Bonn, as the deputy director responsible for the Army.

On 11 July 1963 Moll was promoted to major general and took over from Johann Adolf Graf von Kielmansegg as commander of the 10th Panzer Division in Sigmaringen. In 1965, he was promoted to lieutenant general, and he appointed as Deputy Inspector of the Army under Ulrich de Maizière. On 25 August 1966 he was made Inspector of the Army, the chief of staff of the German Army, which he served as until his retirement on 30 September 1968. On the occasion of his retirement he was awarded the Grand Cross of Merit with Star.

Military offices
Preceded by Generalleutnant Ulrich de Maizière	Inspector of the Army; 25 August 1966 – 30 September 1968	Succeeded by Generalleutnant Albert Schnez
Preceded by Generalmajor Karl-Wilhelm Thilo	Deputy Inspector of the Army; 1 January 1965 – 24 August 1966	Succeeded by Generalmajor Hubert Sonneck
Preceded by Generalmajor Johann Adolf Graf von Kielmansegg	Commander of 10th Panzer Division (Bundeswehr); 11 July 1963 – 1 Januar 1965	Succeeded by Generalmajor Kurt Gerber
