= Johann von Kielmansegg =

German military officer

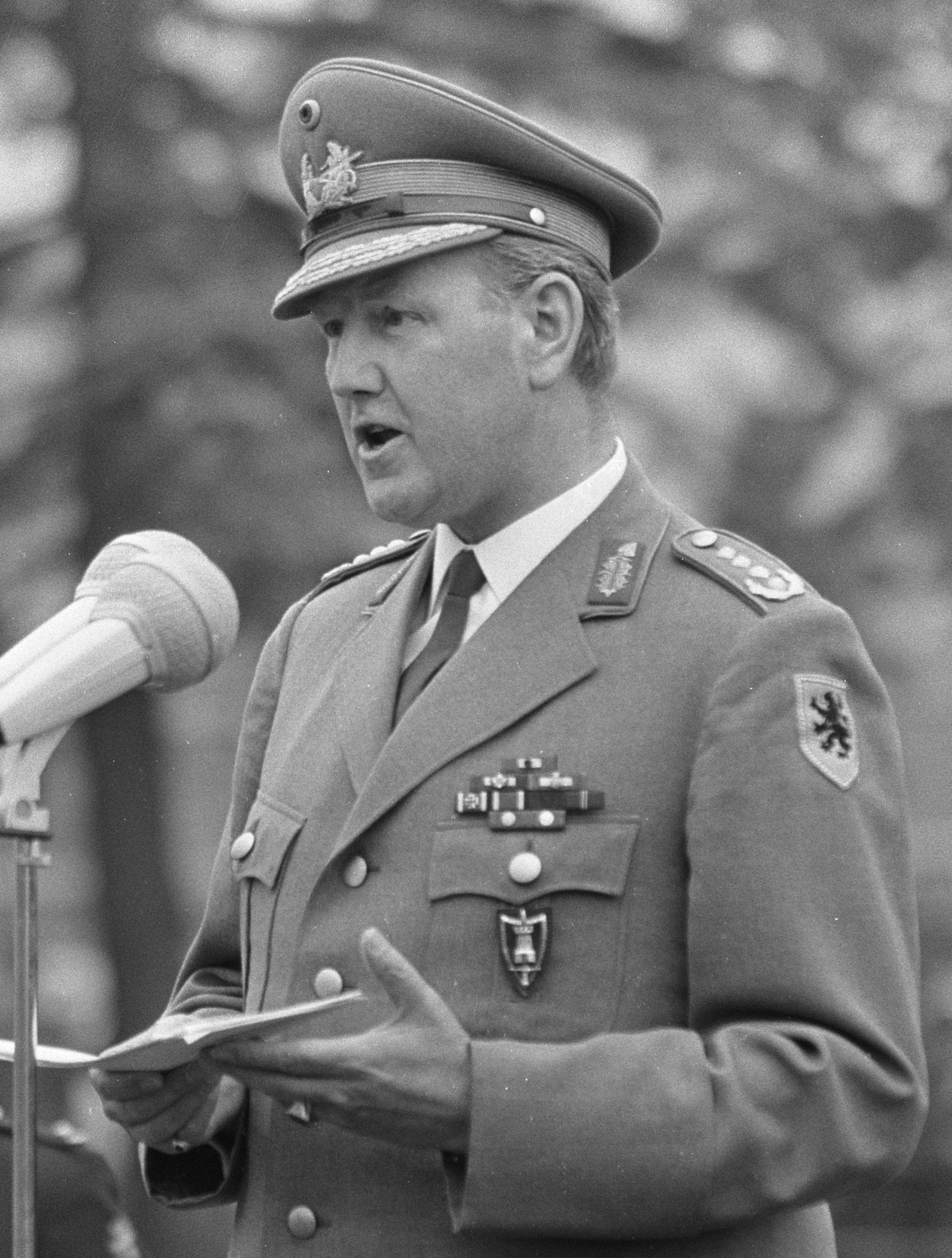
- Johann von Kielmansegg in 1967
- Born: 30 December 1906; Hofgeismar, Province of Hesse-Nassau, Kingdom of Prussia, German Empire
- Died: 26 May 2006 (aged 99); Bonn, North Rhine-Westphalia, Germany
- Relatives: Werner von Fritsch
- Military career
- Allegiance: Weimar Republic (until 1933); Nazi Germany (until 1945); West Germany (until 1968)
- Service years: 1926–1945; 1955–1968
- Rank: General
- Unit: 11th Panzer Division
- Commands: 111th Panzer Grenadier Regiment 5th Panzer Division 10th Panzergrenadier Division Allied Joint Force Command Brunssum
- Conflicts: World War II

Johann Adolf Graf von Kielmansegg (30 December 1906 – 26 May 2006) was a German general staff officer during the Second World War and later general of the Bundeswehr.

== Military career ==
Johann Adolf Graf von Kielmansegg joined the German Army on 7 April 1926 after his time in cadet school in Rosleben and served as a cavalry officer in the 16th Cavalry Regiment in Hofgeismar, Langensalza and Erfurt. In 1930 he was promoted to lieutenant, and in 1937, to captain. From October 1937 to August 1939 he received General Staff training at the Prussian Military Academy in Berlin.

During the Second World War Kielmansegg served in various divisions, staff regiments and fronts in Poland, France and Russia. From 1942 to 1944 he served as General Staff officer to the High Command of the Wehrmacht (OKW). On 1 May 1944, he was promoted to colonel. Several months later, he was arrested by the Gestapo for being a co-conspirator of the 20 July plot, but released on 23 October 1944 for a lack of evidence. He later said:

The plotters set a good example to the army, because these men put their lives on the line against the dictator.

— Johann von Kielmansegg

In November 1944, shortly before the Battle of the Bulge, he was given command of the 111th Panzer Grenadier Regiment, and led it in battle until 16 April 1945.

After the war, Kielmansegg was first a British and later American prisoner of war. He was released in May 1946 and later worked as a truck driver on a farm. From February 1948, he worked as a journalist. And finally from 1949 onwards, as a publishing assistant in Hamburg.

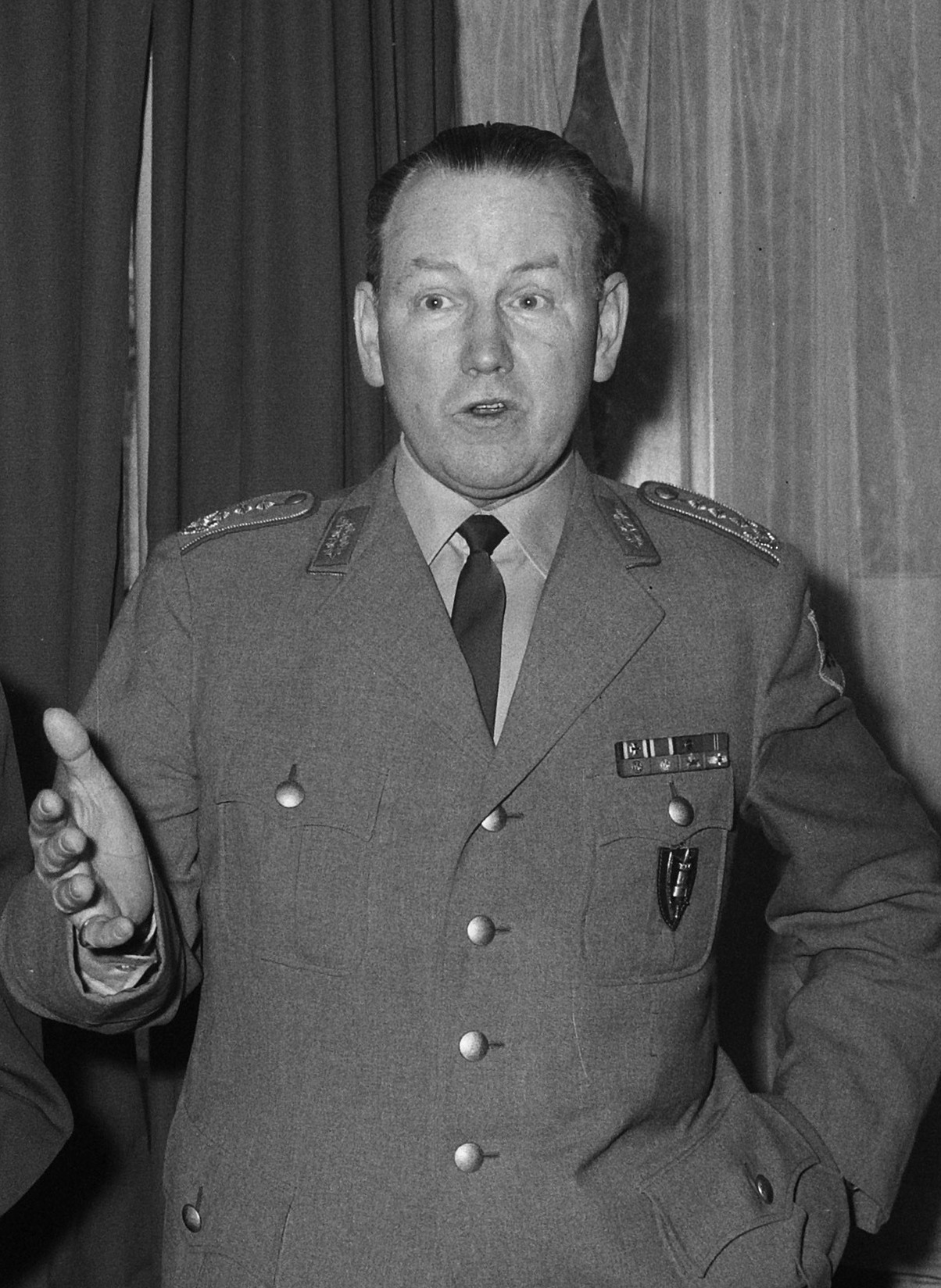
Johann von Kielmansegg in 1967

In 1949, Kielmansegg published a book called The Fritsch Affair of 1938 in the defence on his uncle, General Werner von Fritsch, in order to "wash away those charges of homosexual activity". Remarkably, Fritsch's fierce antisemitism and openly anti-democratic views were not addressed as problematic aspects of his personality.

In October 1950 Kielmansegg was appointed to the Blank Office in Bonn, where he remained until 1955. Later in 1955, he became the Secretary for Military Policy, and then Deputy Director General of National Defence. During this time, he was the German delegate in the negotiations on the European Defence Community and the London and Paris Conferences. Kielmansegg is considered one of the spiritual fathers of the principle of "Inner Guidance", which was the hallmark of the Federal Armed Forces in uniform with the concept of the citizen.

In 1955, Kielmansegg re-joined the German Armed Forces in the rank of brigadier general. From 1955 to 1958 he acted as National Military Representative at Supreme Headquarters of Allied Powers in Europe (SHAPE).

Then Kielmansegg, from 1958 to 1960, commanded the 5th Panzer Division in Koblenz as a major general. In 1961, he commanded the 10th Panzer Grenadier Division in Sigmaringen. In 1963 he was again active in the International area and was, since 5 July 1963, as lieutenant general of NATO's Supreme Command, of Allied Land Forces Central Europe in Fontainebleau, in France. In 1965, he was awarded with the Freiherr-vom-Stein Prize. On 15 March 1967, he was promoted to Commander-in-Chief of NATO's forces in Central Europe, first in Fontainebleau, France, and then in Brunssum, in the Netherlands.

== Later life ==
On 1 April 1968, Kielmansegg retired from the Bundeswehr. His NATO successor was Jürgen Bennecke.

In 1985, together with Oskar Weggel, he published the book Invincible?, analysing the military power of China.

Kielmansegg recorded an extended account of his experiences with the Wehrmacht in World War II for the production of the television documentary series Hitler's Warriors (or Hitler's Generals) (1998).

== Personal life ==
Kielmansegg was the youngest of three children of Johann Adolf von Kielmansegg (1864 - 1907) and his wife Eva Mathilde (1868 - 1953). His two sisters, Ilse and Anna, both married into noble families. In 1933, he married Mechthild von Dincklage. They had two daughters and two sons, including the German political scientist Peter von Kielmansegg. He is the grandfather of law professor Sebastian Graf von Kielmansegg.

Kielmansegg died on 26 May 2006, at the age of 99.

Military offices
Preceded by Generalmajor Leo Hepp	Commander of 10th Panzer Division (Bundeswehr); 21 October 1960 – 11 July 1963	Succeeded by Generalmajor Josef Moll
