= Newman baronets of Cecil Lodge (1912) =

Baronetcy

Escutcheon of the Newman baronets of Cecil Lodge

The Neumann (later Newman) baronetcy of Cecil Lodge, Newmarket, in the County of Cambridge was created in the Baronetage of the United Kingdom on 6 February 1912 for Sigismund Neumann (1857–1916), a financier in South Africa.

== Neumann (later Newman) baronets of Cecil Lodge (1912) ==
- Sir Sigismund Neumann, 1st Baronet (1857–1916). He was the son of Gustav Neumann of Fürth, Bavaria. He was a partner in the firms of S. Neumann and Co., merchants, and Neumann, Luebeck and Co., bankers.
- Sir Cecil Gustavus Jacques Newman, 2nd Baronet (1891–1955). He assumed by Royal licence the surname of Newman in lieu of Neumann in 1936.
- Sir Gerard Robert Henry Sigismund Newman, 3rd Baronet (1927–1987).
- Sir Francis Hugh Cecil Newman, 4th Baronet (born 1963) is the current holder of the baronetcy.

The heir apparent to the baronetcy is Thomas Ralph Gerard Newman (born 1993), eldest son of Sir Francis Newman.

== Notes ==
Baronetage of the United Kingdom
Preceded by Nelson baronets	Neumann baronets of Cecil Lodge; 6 February 1912	Succeeded by Nicholson baronets
