= John Storey Barwick =

English industrialist involved within quarries, coal-mining, shipping and shipbuilding

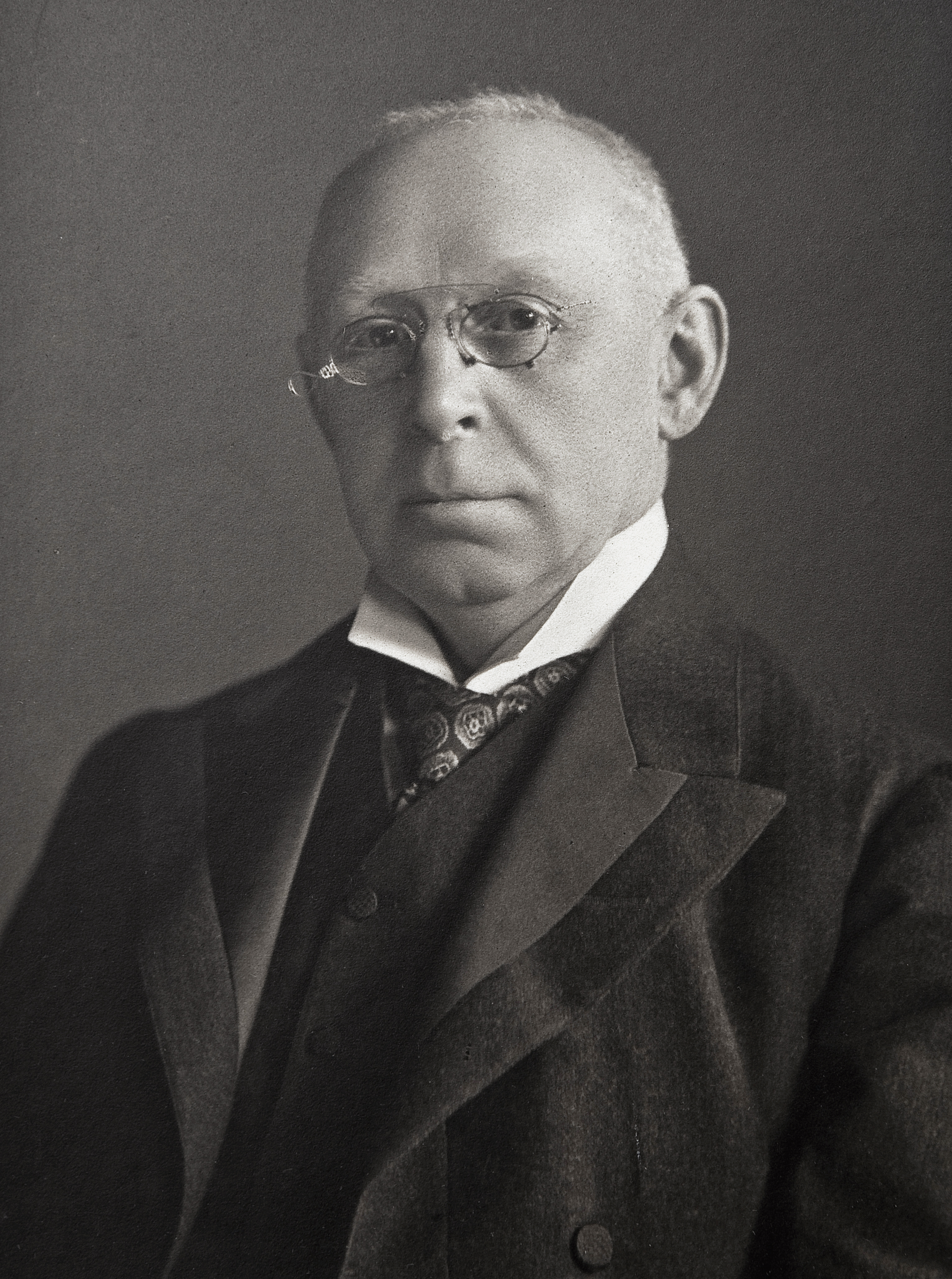
Sir John Storey Barwick

John Storey Barwick, 1st Baronet of Ashbrooke Grange, J.P., (1840–1915), was an English industrialist with quarries, coal-mines, shipping and shipbuilding concerns. He was founder of Easington Colliery in 1899 then known as The Easington Coal Company Limited a privately owned company of which he was chairman. Barwick was made first baronet of Ashbrooke Grange in 1912.

== Early life ==
Barwick was born in Sunderland, Durham, the eldest son of William Barwick (1816–1900) a farmer from the Darlington area, and his wife Mary Storey (1818–1888). He was raised and educated in Sunderland, becoming a ship owner and quarry owner. He died in 1915 at Thimbleby Hall, Osmotherley, North Yorkshire. He is buried at Sunderland Cemetery, Ryhope Road.

== Career ==
John Storey Barwick began his career by entering into a humble clerical position within the offices of the Ryhope Coal Co. Ltd, an established firm then owned by Lord Londonderry (The Earl Vane). He progressed up the ladder within Ryhope, investing his money wisely in the shipping industry, eventually he would become managing director of Ryhope, and broker to the company conducting its sales, and a principal representative of Lord Londonderry (Viscount Castlereagh) in his other business dealings.

Having established his skill within the colliery business, Barwick would join forces with a network of other northern industrial entrepreneurs, the core of which were principally Sir Christopher Furness, 1st Baron Furness (1852 - 1912), Sir John Barwick and Sir Walter Scott, 1st Baronet, of Beauclerc (1826 – 1910). These men participated in a series of ventures across a range of industries, Scott and Barwick serving as directors or trustees for debenture holders in several public firms that were associated with Furness, investing heavily in his enterprises. Barwick was also involved in Furness-led shipping ventures, such as the Northumberland Shipbuilding Company (NSB), which pioneered the construction of standardised general cargo vessels, the firm had been bought by Rowland Hodge in 1898 in a deal in which Hodge, Furness and Barwick would jointly buy a controlling one third share each. Eventually Barwick would become one of the largest shareholders of the British transport Company of Furness Withy & Company, founded in 1891 with eighteen ships operating between New York and Newcastle.

=== Easington Colliery ===
The Easington Coal Company Limited was a private company formed in 1899 by both Sir Christopher Furness and Sir John Storey Barwick who financed it as a private undertaking, with an initial capital investment of £210,000. Easington developed a virgin coalfield on the coast between Hartlepool and Seaham. The promoters of Easington planned to export the output of the colliery through Sunderland and Seaham Harbour, both places with which Sir John was closely associated. Barwick was on the board of the North Eastern Railway at that time, which built lines connecting the three points, but the real challenge facing the firm was to mine coal from seams running out under the North Sea. Progress would be slow and troubled at first, by 1910 a depth of only 1320 ft feet had been reached, problems were caused by water entering the works that had to be overcome using a freezing plant. After eleven years high-grade coal would eventually be mined from an eleven-foot seam. The Iron & Coal Trades Review (ICTR) 'expected the annual output of the new company to reach two million tons, making it the larges coal mine in the country' When Sir John died in 1915, his son also Sir John Storey Barwick, 2nd Baronet (1876–1953) would take on the roll of chairman until 1947 when the business was nationalised. Easington operated for a period of 94 years finally closing in 1993. Easington Colliery doubled as the fictitious Everington in the 2000 musical drama Billy Elliot.

=== Other industries ===
In 1899 Barwick also became a director of the Weardale Steel, Iron and Coal Co. set up by Sir Christopher Furness in September 1899 to take over the Weardale Iron & Coal Company, it ran a number of collieries taking over Tudhoe, Croxdale, Black Prince, West Thornley, Hedley Hill, Middridge, Thornley, Ludworth, and Wheatley Hill.

In 1905 Barwick became director of The Cargo Fleet Iron Co Ltd, and in 1909 he joined with Christopher Furness and Walter Scott to acquire the firm of Wingate Coal Co. purchased from John Gully, they would run it as a private concern. Wingate's purchase was conducted on a leveraged basis with the buyers putting down a lump sum and borrowing the larger percentage from the National Provincial Bank.

Other businesses that Barwick and Furness were jointly associated with were the Great Boulder Perseverance Gold Mining Company and Robert Stephenson and Company Limited floats’; Barwick acted as trustee for R. Stephenson and guarantor. Barwick was a director within the North Eastern Banking Company established in 1872 in Newcastle with the specific purpose of providing finance for heavy industries, and he was director within the European Petroleum Company.

Where shipping interests were concerned Barwick was Director of Seaham Docks Limited. In addition he was a member of the River Wear Commission, and the River Wear Watch, the Local Marine Board, the Chamber of Commerce, and was one of the local directors of Lloyd's British Testing Company.

In 1903 John Storey Barwick was president of the Sunderland and North Durham Liberal Club, founded by Samuel Storey in 1874, and he was a leading member of the Sunderland Liberal Association. He was both a borough and a county magistrate.

== Personal life ==
Barwick was married to Margaret Short (1853–1908) a younger daughter of the shipbuilder George Short, founder of the British shipbuilding company Short Brothers of Sunderland; they had two sons and four daughters. Barwick lived at Ashbrooke Grange in Sunderland and at Thimbleby Hall, Osmotherley, Northallerton, Yorkshire. The Baronetage passed on to his eldest son Sir John Storey Barwick, 2nd Baronet (1876–1953) after his death in 1915.

Baronetage of the United Kingdom
| New creation | Baronet (of Ashbrooke Grange); 1912–1915 | Succeeded by John Storey Barwick |
