= Bill Barwick =

American singer-songwriter

- Genres: Western
- Instrument(s): Guitar, trumpet, singing
- Years active: 1984–2017
- Website: billbarwick.com

Bill Barwick (March 12, 1946 – November 10, 2017) was an American Western music singer-songwriter, guitarist, and voiceover artist based in Colorado.

== Early life ==
Barwick was originally from North Carolina, and started making music at the age of eight. He lived for a time in Hampton, New Hampshire. As a teenage trumpet player, he attended the Summer Youth Music School program at the University of New Hampshire, where he lived, worked, and played for two weeks exclusively with other musicians. He has said of that experience:

I don't know where my life would have gone if I hadn't met people who loved music as much as I did. I also learned there were people more talented than me, better at their instruments, who worked harder, who practiced more. The only way I would get better, I realized, was to work at it. I learned diligence and a practice ethic.

He moved west to Denver in the 1970s and lived there until his death.

== Musical career ==
Barwick has been a weekly regular at Denver's historic Buckhorn Exchange since 1984. For over 30 years, he has been a major part of the Walnut Valley Festival in Winfield, Kansas, one of the country's largest acoustic music events. He has appeared at Silver Dollar City in Branson, Missouri, as well as at venues from Anchorage to Boston. He has been called "a poet, a seer, a romantic and a realist, whose music is strictly Western to boot."

He has recorded nine CDs on his own independent record label.

== Voiceover career ==
Barwick's deep voice has been heard in hundreds of narrations, advertisements, infomercials, and public service announcements. It is one of modern media's most recognized voices. As the official spokesperson for the Encore Westerns channel, Barwick has been heard worldwide via satellite and cable TV. His long list of voice clients has included Village Inn, Western Rural Electric, and Wyoming Tourism. He also voiced a life-sized animatronic buffalo head in a store at Denver International Airport. The head was soon taken out of service, however; while the retail staff loved the recorded voice, they couldn't stand hearing it over and over again as customers entered the store.

== Awards ==
The National Cowboy & Western Heritage Museum presented him with a Western Heritage Wrangler Award for his 2012 album The Usual Suspects. Other awards for him or his songs include:

- Western Music Association – 2009 Male Performer of the Year (finalist, 2010, 2011, 2012, 2013, 2014); Entertainer of the Year Finalist, 2008, 2009, 2010, 2011, 2012, 2013, 2014; Album of the Year Finalist, 2010.
- Academy of Western Artists – Will Rogers Award, Male Vocalist of the Year, 2005 (finalist, 2009); Western Music Album/CD of the Year finalist, 2007; Song of the Year Finalist, 2007.
- Power Source Magazine – No. 1 Record, 2006, "There Ain't No Quit"

== Personal life ==
Like his heroes Roy Rogers and Don Edwards, Barwick openly admitted that he did not grow up on a ranch. Though he never lived on one, he did live the "cowboy way" — as a man who lived with accountability and integrity and who was always prepared and always kept his word. He traveled light, and never put a horse away wet. Bill died at Presbyterian Hospital in Albuquerque, NM on November 10, 2017 from complications due to an aneurysm.
