= Barwick, Kentucky =

Unincorporated community in Kentucky, United States

Barwick
- Unincorporated community
- Location within the state of Kentucky Barwick (the United States)
- Coordinates: 37°22′00″N 83°21′59″W
- Country: United States
- State: Kentucky
- County: Breathitt
- Elevation: 801 ft (244 m)
- Time zone: UTC-6 (Central (CST))
  - Summer (DST): UTC-5 (CST)
- ZIP codes: 41306
- GNIS feature ID: 510425

Barwick is an unincorporated community and coal town in Breathitt County, Kentucky, United States.
