= Rosie Newman =

British documentary film maker and author

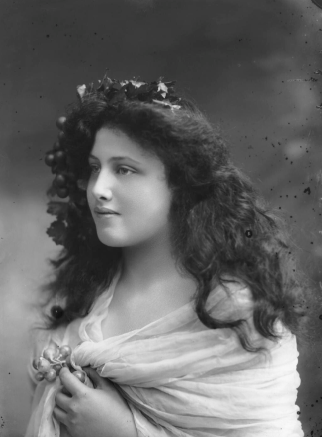
Rosie Violet Nina Millicent Neumann (Newman), by Bassano in 1910

Rosie Violet Nina Millicent Newman FRGS (surname at birth Neumann) (1896–1988) was a British amateur director of documentary films. She is best known for Britain at War of 1946, colour reportage of World War II. From a wealthy background, she belonged to London society circles, and her connections facilitated her film work.

== Early life and family ==
She was the second daughter of Sigismund Neumann and his Egyptian-born wife Anna Allegra Hakim. The family home in London was 146 Piccadilly. The Neumanns were in the social circle of Edward VII, but Anna's pretensions were snubbed by Alice Keppel.

Neumann died in 1916; the family definitively adopted the surname Newman 20 years later, with a change in 1936 by royal licence. Rosie's elder sister Sybil married, in 1923 as her second husband, the politician Robert Grimston; The Tatler in 1943 described the sisters as "almost inseparable".

== Interwar period filming ==
In the interwar period Newman shot in 16mm, in Morocco and India. She acquired her first film camera in 1928 for a trip to Morocco, from Wallace Heaton in London's Bond Street, and made a black-and-white film. She shot footage of her travels in Egypt and especially in India, where she covered the life of British high society and tourism. The resulting films were shown to friends, but also publicly at charity events. Glimpses of India (1935) was filmed while Newman and her mother were guests of Lord Willingdon, the Viceroy. It was shown at a number of charity fundraising events in London. It ran to 75 minutes, and mixed colour (Kodacolor) with black-and-white.

Taking up 16mm Kodachrome colour stock shortly after it was introduced by Eastman Kodak, Newman experimented with it in Paris during 1935. She was nominated a Fellow of the Royal Geographical Society, where she had shown her films, and was elected in February 1936. A showing of her India film at Grosvenor House on 18 February, hosted by Lady Headley and chaired by the Duke of Portland, led Newman to write an account of the Indian visit as "The Indian Scene in 1935" in the Asiatic Review, a publication of the East India Association. The Duke of York and his family lived at 145 Piccadilly, next to the Newman residence; and that year Newman filmed his children Elizabeth (the future Elizabeth II of the United Kingdom) and Margaret Rose; the colour footage was made public in 2008.

While making her film about Egypt, Newman stayed with the diplomat David Kelly and his wife Marie. Kelly returned from Cairo to London in 1938.

== World War II ==
At the beginning of World War II Newman entered the Women's Voluntary Services. In March 1940 she travelled to France to film. Her chauffeur Bob Fennymore went ahead with a car and 12 cases of film equipment. On 28 March she flew from Heston aerodrome to Le Bourget, with a friend, Lady Joan Birkbeck, sister of Geoffrey FitzClarence, 5th Earl of Munster, who returned to the United Kingdom in April. Newman went to the south of France, where she filmed French and Senegalese troops. Returning to Paris, she laid on a film screening for the British Expeditionary Force. She left France after the German invasion of the Netherlands, about 13 May. Film rolls taken on the trip, packed in biscuit tins, eventually arrived at the French Embassy in London.

A photograph from 1940/1 shows Newman with a Ciné-Kodak model K. From her record beginning with the London Blitz, she gradually put together the film Britain at War. It had various working titles, was shown before its completion from 1942, and finalised in 1946. Colour stock was not easy to obtain in wartime conditions, and official films were black-and-white. Newman was able to continue to shoot in colour, using stock found for her through American and Canadian diplomatic contacts. Angus Calder in The Myth of the Blitz claims that the colour images cut across expectations set up by the monochrome standard narrative.

Through Lord Willingdon, Newman gained the backing of the Ministry of Information for her filming. Her contact in the Films Division of the Ministry was Ralph Nunn May, brother of Alan Nunn May, who after the war worked as a film producer. She was given exceptional access in June 1941 to film on the destroyer HMS Berkeley. The access was granted after a luncheon party meeting with an admiral, identified tentatively by Jane Fish as Basil Vernon Brooke, a former naval officer who was equerry to the King. The destroyer's captain Hugh Graves Walters lent her a pair of his own trousers, more suitable for getting around the ship. Also in 1941, she visited RAF Digby and was photographed there in the cockpit of a Spitfire of the Royal Canadian Air Force. She was granted access by the Canadian Corps commander Andrew McNaughton and filmed his forces in July 1941. In September that year she filmed lumberjacks from British Honduras working at Haddington, East Lothian, making pit props. The only case in which her access request was strongly opposed was the Fleet Air Arm, which refused her wish to film on an aircraft carrier.

When the family's Piccadilly town house was badly damaged by air raids, Newman moved to the Dorchester Hotel. Alexander Korda took up the lease to 146 Piccadilly, eventually buying the leases of the site of the adjacent house at 145 which had been destroyed for a cinema, and of 144. The Dorchester Hotel was to be Newman's home for over 30 years.

Women's presence as film makers in Britain during WWII was very restricted. A comparable role to Newman's was that of Jessie Matthews in Victory Wedding (1944). Jill Craigie made the art documentary Out of Chaos (1944) for Two Cities Films. Muriel Box became active only after the war was over. Jane Fish cites Kathleen Lockwood in Holmfirth and Arthur Green in London as other amateur film makers of the war, who produced a colour legacy that is held by the Imperial War Museum.

== Later life ==
Newman continued documenting her travels on film into the early 1960s. The first public showing of A Flying Visit to Yugoslavia was for charity, in 1958. She was the subject of an Anglia Television documentary of 1980, Miss Rosie Newman's Colour Supplement. It was shown on American television by WNET and The Discovery Channel in the 1980s, as Miss Rosie Newman's Color Supplement.

Rosie Newman died in 1988.

== Works ==
Most of Newman's cinematic legacy is held in the Imperial War Museum, in the noted Rosie Newman Collection.

- Scenes At Croydon Aerodrome And Earl Haig's Funeral, Croydon and Piccadilly (1928)
- Morocco 1928
- Glimpses of India (1935).
- Further Glimpses of India (1935)
- Across the Border [Scotland] (1936)
- England Our England (1937). It includes footage of the inspection tour by King George VI of the Royal Navy .
- To the Land of the Pharaohs (1937). It was first shown in 1939 at the Connaught Place house of Geoffrey Hope-Morley, 2nd Baron Hollenden and his wife, to an audience of about 200.
- The France I Knew (1940)
- Britain at War (1946). An early version, England at War, was screened privately on 7 May 1942 at the Dorchester Hotel, to guests including the Lord Mayor of London and Lord Willingdon.
- By Air to Cyprus and Athens (1953)
- Morocco 1928+1966

=== Commentary ===
Newman's earlier films were the subject of the first part, "A World Away", of The Thirties in Colour, a four-part BBC television series from 2008, directed by Christina Lowry with David Okuefuna as executive director. The four-part series used rare, private and commercial film and photographic archives to give insights into the 1930s, a decade when polychromatic photographic technology came of age and three major processes—Dufaycolour, Technicolor and Kodachrome—were brought to the market. The opening part looks at the work of Rosie Newman. The cast included Miranda Richardson. Some of the commentary related to the details of the documentary content:

- Sometimes Newman didn't understand what she was seeing, as in the subtitle "A picturesque alley of houses with barred windows". In fact, it showed a brothel district with prostitutes.
- On Girgaon Chowpatty, a beach in Mumbai, she filmed a crowd, apparently unaware that it was a political gathering for the Indian independence movement.

=== Books ===
Newman's writings related mostly to her films.

- To the land of the pharaohs. The story of the film. Athenaeum Press, London [c. 1940]
- England at War. Chiswick Press, London 1942 (black-and-white illustrations)
- Impressions of liberated Belgium after V.E. day 1945. London 1945, self-published
- Britain at War: Narrative of a Film Record. MaxLove Publishing, London, 1948 (2nd edition)
