= Hitler's Warriors =

1998 German TV documentary series

- DVD cover
- Hitlers Krieger
- Genre: Educational
- Created by: Guido Knopp; Henry Kohler; Jörg Müllner
- Based on: World War II
- Written by: Jörg Müllner
- Directed by: Guido Knopp; Jörg Müllner
- Narrated by: Christian Brückner
- Country of origin: Germany
- Original language: German
- No. of episodes: 6

Production
- Running time: 260 minutes
- Production company: Zweites Deutsches Fernsehen

Original release
- Network: ZDF Channel
- Release: October 13 – November 24, 1998

Hitler's Warriors (German title: Hitlers Krieger) is a 1998 six-episode series of German historical documentaries first aired on Zweites Deutsches Fernsehen, created by Guido Knopp and co-created by Jörg Müllner and Henry Kohler. The series looks at six of the most important senior military officers of Nazi Germany in World War II. Profiling these men, the series explores the questions behind "why it all happened".

The senior officers consist of Field Marshal Erich von Manstein, referred to as "the strategist"; Field Marshal Friedrich Paulus, referred to as "the defector"; Field Marshal Erwin Rommel, referred to as "the hero of Tobruk"; Field Marshal Wilhelm Keitel, referred to as "the lackey"; Colonel General Ernst Udet, referred to as "the Devil's general"; and Admiral Wilhelm Canaris, referred to as "the conspirator".

== Overview ==
Each documentary lasts from 40 to 45 minutes. The series focus on each individual's involvement in the war effort and responsibility regarding crimes committed under their command.

While profiling their military careers, the documentary features statements, comments, criticism, and opinions from their former colleagues and veterans regarding their triumphs or fatal blunders. While profiling their private life, the documentary features personal insights from wives, relatives, friends, and children such as Rüdiger Manstein and Manfred Rommel.

The series also features private family photographs and footage never revealed to the public before, including private visits with Hitler and other top Nazi or military officials.

== Episodes ==
No.	Title
1	"Erwin Rommel, "The Hero of Tobruk"
The "Desert Fox" more famously and officially known as Erwin Rommel was a decorated veteran of the First World War. He became a hero in Germany after his victories in France and North Africa. He was forced to commit suicide following the failed assassination attempt on Hitler's life in 1944.
2	"Erich von Manstein, "The Strategist"
Erich von Manstein, a decorated veteran of World War I, was shattered by the German surrender of 1918. He is famous worldwide for his brilliant "Sickle Cut" plan that led to the fall of France in 1940. He rose to the rank of field marshal and later led the German summer offensive at Kursk. He survived the war and died in 1973.
3	"Friedrich Paulus, "The Defector"
Friedrich Paulus, an aristocratic veteran, played a key role in the German rearmament. He led the 6th Army during the Battle of Stalingrad, but was declared a "traitor" after surrendering, and was held in Russian captivity until 1954. He died in East Germany a few years later in 1957.
4	"Ernst Udet, "The Devil's General"
Ernst Udet, the second-highest scoring German flying ace of World War I, played a key role with Göring in rebuilding the Luftwaffe, and rose to the rank of colonel general. He took part in the invasion of Russia, but after bitter personal disputes with his family and Göring, he committed suicide on 17 November 1941. Hitler and the top Nazi chieftains attended his funeral.
5	"Wilhelm Canaris, "The Conspirator"
Wilhelm Canaris became chief of the Abwehr, the German military intelligence service in 1935, a post he would hold until 1944. He was among the military officers involved in the clandestine opposition to Hitler and the Nazi regime. He was executed in the Flossenbürg concentration camp for the act of high treason.
6	"Wilhelm Keitel, "The Lackey"
Wilhelm Keitel, an intelligence officer and adjutant of the First World War, was the one who secretly organized the German rearmament. After Hitler came to power, he became a field marshal and chief of the Oberkommando der Wehrmacht, the supreme armed forces high command, a post he would hold until the end of war. He was convicted of war crimes and hanged in 1946.

== Companion book ==
- Knopp, Guido (2008). Hitler's Warriors. The History Press. ISBN 978-0-750-9260-1-0.

== See also ==
- How Hitler Lost the War
- Soviet Storm: World War II in the East
- World War II In HD Colour
