= John Barwick (theologian) =

English theologian

John Barwick (fl. 1340) was an English theologian.

== Life ==
Barwick took his name from Berwick, where he appears to have been born or brought up. From Berwick he seems to have removed to the Franciscan schools at Oxford, at which university he became a Doctor of Theology, and is enumerated as the twenty-second reader of divinity belonging to that order in the early years of the fourteenth century. He appears to have studied at Paris likewise; for we are told by Dempster and Bale that he also went by the name of Breulanlius; and this Breulanlius is mentioned towards the end of the fifteenth century by the all-accomplished Pico della Mirandula as resisting Roger Bacon and other philosophers, who seem to have advocated the study of astrology at the university of Paris. Leland also calls him the contemporary of William of Ockham, of whose doctrines, he adds, Barwick was a strenuous adherent. Bale states that he flourished about 1340; and he appears to have read divinity lectures at Oxford about the beginning of the fourteenth century. But this seems assigning rather a late date to an opponent of Roger Bacon. He was buried at Stamford.

== Works ==
His chief works were a commentary on Peter Lombard, and the treatise entitled ‘Super Astrologorum Prognosticis,’ which Bale praises highly. His other writings were on the ordinary mediaeval scholastic subjects. Dempster gives a full list.
