= Barwick baronets =

Extinct baronetcy in the Baronetage of the United Kingdom

The Barwick baronetcy, of Ashbrooke Grange, in the Borough of Sunderland, in the County of County Durham, was a title in the Baronetage of the United Kingdom. It was created on 1 February 1912 for the coalfitter and shipowner John Storey Barwick. It became extinct upon the death in 1979 of his grandson, the 3rd Baronet. He left three daughters, and a stepson Robert John Christopher Barwick-Ward (1942–2017), but no male heir to the title.

== Barwick baronets, of Ashbrooke Grange (1912) ==
- Sir John Storey Barwick, 1st Baronet (1840–1915)
- Sir John Storey Barwick, 2nd Baronet (1876–1953)
- Sir Richard Llewellyn Barwick, 3rd Baronet (1916–1979)

Baronetage of the United Kingdom
Preceded by Heaton baronets	Barwick baronets of Ashbrooke Grange; 1 February 1912	Succeeded by Forster baronets
